= Hal Koerner =

American ultramarathon runner (born 1976)

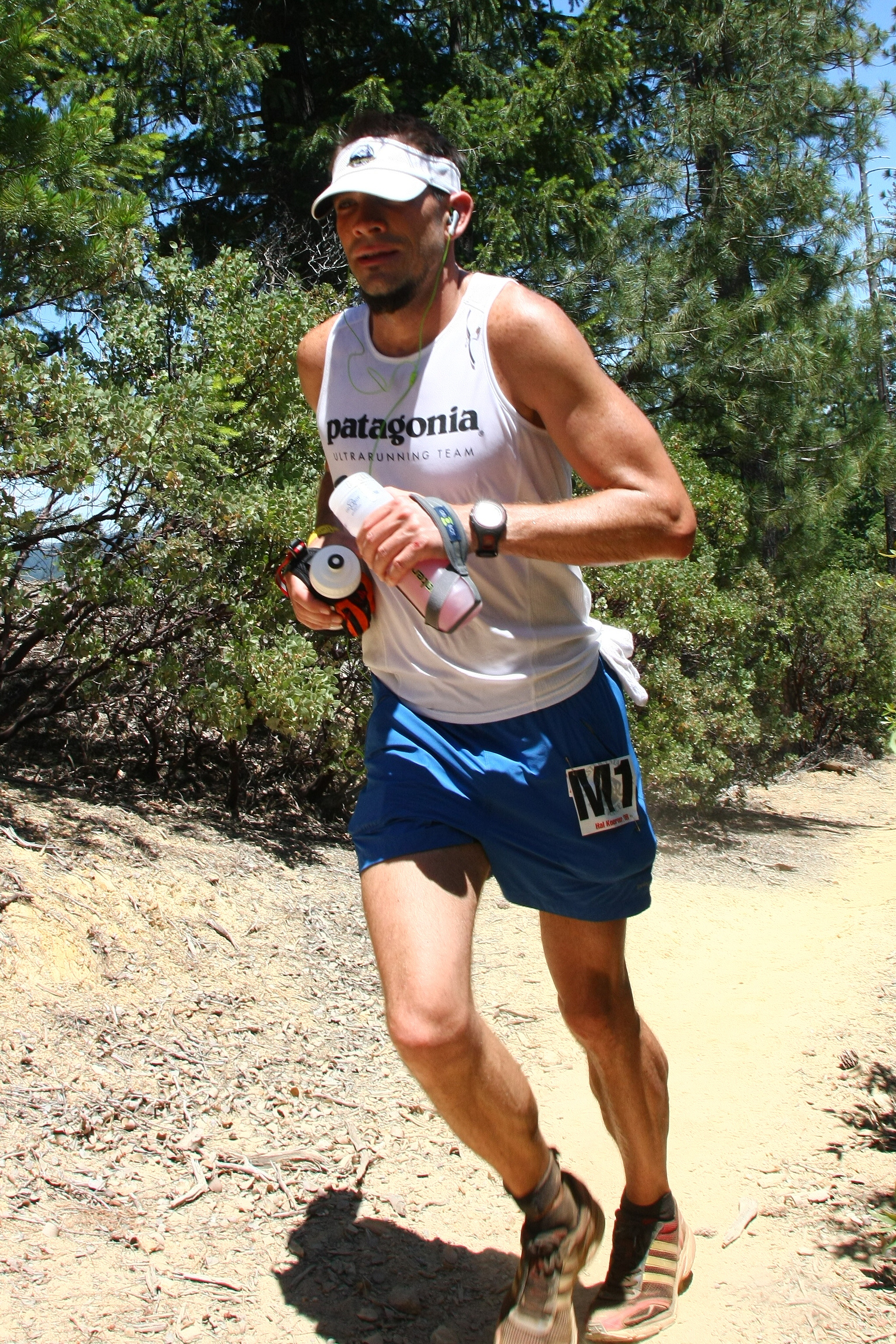
Hal Koerner climbing into Michigan Bluff during the Western States 100 in 2009. A race he would eventually win.

Hal Koerner (born January 23, 1976, in Morgantown, WV) is an American distance runner specializing in ultramarathon running. Hal has won the Hardrock Hundred Mile Endurance Run and has back to back victories at Western States Endurance Run in 2007 and 2009.

Koerner is the owner of a specialty running store, Rogue Valley Runners, located in the southern Oregon town of Ashland. He is one of the subjects of JB Benna's feature-length documentary "Unbreakable: The Western States 100".

He is the race director of the Pine to Palm 100 Mile Endurance Run – a hundred-mile foot race from Williams, OR to Ashland, OR held each year during the second weekend in September. He also directs the Siskiyou Out Back Trail Run Festival (8k, 15k, 50k, 50M and 100k) held on Mount Ashland annually since 1999. Additionally, he created and directs the Lithia Loop Trail Marathon / Mini-Marathon / 10k also held in Ashland, OR the first weekend in November.

In 2014, Hal Koerner's Field Guide to Ultrarunning was published and released by VeloPress. The book details training for an ultra marathon, which run from 50k to 100 miles. It debuted #1 in its category on Amazons bestsellers list.

Koerner has held the Fastest Known Time for the Colorado Trail (489 miles) and the John Muir Trail (221 miles). To date he has completed over 150 ultra marathons.

== Notable wins ==
- Javelina Jundred, 2013
- Hardrock Hundred Mile Endurance Run, 2012
- Rocky Raccoon 100, 2012
- Javelina Jundred, 2011
- Canadian Death Race, 2010
- Western States Endurance Run, 2009
- Angeles Crest 100, 2008
- Western States Endurance Run, 2007
- Angeles Crest 100, 2006
- The Bear 100, 1999-2003
- Kettle Morraine 100, 2001
