= Jeff Browning =

American ultrarunner

Sport
- Country: United States
- Sport: Ultramarathon
- Coached by: Self

Jeff Browning is an American ultramarathon runner and coach. After moving to Bend, Oregon, Browning transitioned from mountain biking to ultrarunning, and has since won more than two dozen 100 mile races. Previously a graphic designer, Browning has been a professional runner and coach since 2017. He was listed as one of the top 10 ultrarunners of the year by Ulrarunning Magazine in 2019, 2021, and 2022, and is the oldest runner ever to be included in these awards. He attributes his success and longevity in the sport to not only a high volume of running, but an additional focus on cross training, strength and mobility work, and adherence to a low carb, high fat diet.

== Selected race results ==
=== Wins ===
- Hardrock 100
- Bear 100 Mile Endurance Run
- Bighorn 100
- Moab 240
- Coldwater Rumble 100
- Mogollon Monster 100
- HURT 100
- Cascade Crest
- Tarawera 100
