= Tara Dower =

Female US ultramarathon runner

Tara Dower (born 1993) is an American ultramarathoner. In 2024, she set the overall fastest known time (FKT) on the Appalachian Trail, heading southbound. She has also set speed records on the Mountains-to-Sea Trail, Colorado Trail and the Benton MacKaye Trail. She won the Umstead 100 overall in 2024.

== Early life and education ==
Tara Dower grew up in North Carolina, where she played soccer and participated in track and cross-country during school. In college, she played rugby. She attended East Carolina University and graduated in 2016.

== Career ==
In 2017, Dower attempted a thru-hike of the Appalachian Trail but had to end the attempt early following a panic attack. She completed the thru-hike in 2019 alongside her then husband, Jonathan.

In 2020, Dower set her first speed record, completing the 1,175 mile (1,891 kilometer) Mountains-to-Sea Trail in North Carolina. She did so before competing in any organized ultramarathon race.

Dower began competing regularly in ultramarathon trail racing in 2021. Over the next few years she ran multiple 100-mile races such as Uwharrie, Cruel Jewel, and Hellbender. She completed the Hardrock Hundred in Colorado in July 2024.

Dower's speed record on the Appalachian Trail was supported by her crew chief, Megan Wilmarth. Dower used her speed record on the Appalachian Trail to fundraise for the nonprofit Girls on the Run and has spoken about how she hopes her effort inspires other women's athletic accomplishments. She is the first woman since 2015 to hold the overall speed record on the Appalachian Trail (the previous woman to hold this record was Jennifer Pharr Davis). Often putting in 17-hour days, Dower completed the Appalachian Trail about 13 hours ahead of Karel Sabbe's 2018 record (of 41 days, 7 hours, 39 minutes).

In 2025, Dower broke Camille Herron's course record for Javelina Jundred 100 miler by more than 30 minutes with a time of 13 hours, 31 minutes, and 47 seconds.

== Records/wins ==
- Long Trail fastest known time (2025) — 3d, 18h, 29m.
- Appalachian Trail fastest known time (2024) – 40d, 18h, 6m.
- Umstead 100 Ultramarathon (2024) – 14h, 58m, 21s. Overall 1st place
- Colorado Trail fastest known time (2023) – 8d 21h 59m.
- Devil Dog 100 Ultramarathon (2022) – 20h, 08m, 31s. Overall 1st place.
- Benton MacKaye Trail fastest known time (2022) – 4d 21h 25m 0s.
- Mountains-to-Sea Trail fastest known time (2020) – 29d, 8h, 48m.
- Javelina Jundred 100 mile (2025) — 13:31:47.
