= Mountain Masochist Trail Run =

50-mile ultramarathon in the United States

The Mountain Masochist Trail Run (MMTR50) is a 50-mile (80 km) ultramarathon that winds its way through the Blue Ridge Mountains. The course begins at the Montebello Campground; runners cover a short out-and-back section on the Blue Ridge Parkway before completing a few short miles of road. The course then meanders northward over various dirt and gravel roads in the National Forest before runners have to negotiate the second half of the course. Leaving Long Mountain aid station, the second half includes dirt and old logging roads as well as several miles of single-track trail. Upon reaching the last aid station at Porters Ridge, runners course downhill for 2.9 miles toward the finish in Montebello. The elevation climbs 9,200 feet and descends 7,000 feet.

== Top finishes ==
=== Top ten men performers ===
1. 2009 Geoff Roes 6:27:55
2. 2003 Dave Mackey 6:48:31
3. 2001 Clark Zealand 6:52:11
4. 2006 Eric Grossman 6:53:18
5. 2004 Sean Andrish 6:56:09
6. 1997 Josh Cox 6:57:10
7. 2009 Lon Freeman 6:58:25
8. 1996 Courtney Campbell 6:59:26
9. 2005 Paul DeWitt 6:59:52
10. 2009 Gary Robbins 7:00:28

=== Top ten women performers ===
1. 2006 Nikki Kimball 7:47:05
2. 2005 Anne Lundblad 7:49:48
3. 2005 Annette Bednosky 7:55:52
4. 2006 Jenn Shelton 7:58:11
5. 2009 Tamsin Anstey 8:09:07
6. 2005 Cat Phillips 8:13:15
7. 2003 Bethany Hunter 8:14:47
8. 2003 Jenny Capel 8:23:35
9. 1994 Janice Anderson 8:27:01
10. 2004 Anthea Schmid 8:27:30
