= Karl Meltzer =

American ultrarunner

Personal information
- Nickname: Speedgoat Karl
- Nationality: American
- Born: December 8, 1967 (age 58)
- Website: www.karlmeltzer.com

Sport
- Country: United States
- Sport: Ultrarunning
- Event: Ultramarathon
- Turned pro: 1999
- Coached by: Self

Karl Meltzer (born December 8, 1967, nicknamed "Speedgoat Karl") is an ultrarunner and ultrarunning coach based in Sandy, Utah. Meltzer has won more 100-mile ultramarathons than any other ultramarathoner, and has held speed records at major U.S. trails, including the Appalachian Trail and the Pony Express Trail. Meltzer's trail runs have been featured in news outlets from Ultrarunning.com to NBC Sports. Meltzer has been a professional ultramarathoner since 1999, and a coach since 2007.

While many ultrarunners tend to be vegetarian and averse to alcohol or caffeine, Meltzer has been seen with bacon, Red Bull, and microbrews.

On September 18, 2016, Meltzer set an Appalachian Trail record by completing the 2,190 miles over 14 states in 45 days 22 hours and 38 minutes. This achievement was featured in a 2017 documentary movie "Made To Be Broken". Meltzer's record was eclipsed in September 2017 by Joe McConaughy in a self-supported run. The current A.T. fastest known time was by Tara Dower in 2024.

Meltzer is the current Race Director for the Speedgoat 50K at Snowbird Ski Resort.

== Ultramarathon wins ==
- All-time winner at the Wasatch 100 (6 times)
- Hardrock 100 (5 times)
- San Diego 100 (3 times)
- Squaw Peak 50 (5 times)
- Bighorn 100 (2 times)
- Bear 100 (3 times)
- Massanutten 100 (4 times)
- Coyote Two Moon 100 (2 times)
- Moab Red Hot 50k (2 times)
- Zane Grey Highline Trail 50 Mile Run
- Devil Dog 100
- No Business 100 (2020)

As of December 11, 2021, Meltzer had won at the 100 mile-distance 45 times, the all-time record. As of March 7, 2010, he had 53 ultra wins in 105 starts.

- Most 100-mile wins during a calendar year with six in 2006, four of them record performances, the final four in a period of eight weeks. Five wins in 2007, 2009, and four in 2005 (previous record held by Eric Clifton, with four 100-mile wins in 1991; Joe Hildebrand also won four 100s in 1999). Meltzer has four times won at least four 100s in a calendar year.
- USATF, Ultrarunning Magazine, RRCA Runner of the Year 2006, Everest Award 2006
- 2nd place Ultrarunning Magazine Ultrarunner of the Year 2007, 2009
- Maine to Georgia 2008, 2176 miles, 500,000′ vertical climbing, in 54 days, 21 hours, 12 minutes, the 4th fastest Appalachian Trail thru-hike. Meltzer stayed up to date with his fans and followers with a catchy "Where's Karl?" campaign.
- Speed Record for running the Pony Express Trail from Sacramento, California to St. Joseph, Missouri
- On September 18, 2016, Meltzer set an Appalachian Trail record by completing the 2,190 miles over 14 states in 45 days 22 hours and 38 minutes.
- On October 17, 2020, Meltzer won the 2020 No Business 100 Mile Race to add to his streak of 19 consecutive years winning a 100-mile race.

=== Notable race results ===
==== 1998 ====
Race	Date	Place	Time	Ref
Wasatch 100	September 5	1st	20:08:00	

==== 1999 ====
Race	Date	Place	Time	Ref
Leona Divide 50 miler	April 17	1st	7:04:25	
Squaw Peak 50 miler	June 5	1st	8:07:29	
Wasatch 100	September 11	2nd	21:49:00	

==== 2000 ====
Race	Date	Place	Time	Ref
Crown King Scramble 50 miler	March 18	2nd	7:54:17	
Wasatch 100	September 9	1st	20:52:56	
Baldy Peaks 50k	October 21	1st	5:39:41	

==== 2001 ====
Race	Date	Place	Time	Ref
Phoenix National Trail 50 Mile Endurance Run	January 6	3rd	7:49:12	
Hagg Mudd 50k	February 17	2nd	3:50:12	
Crown King Scramble 50k	March 17	1st	4:17:53	
Zane Grey Highline Trail 50 miler	April 28	2nd	8:51:30	
Squaw Peak 50 Mile Trail Run	June 2	1st	7:49:25	
Hardrock 100 Endurance Run	July 13	1st	26:39:00	

==== 2002 ====
Race	Date	Place	Time	Ref
Red Rock Fat Ass 50k	January 5	2nd	4:37:00	
Zane Grey Highline Trail 50 miler	April 27	1st	8:07:00	
Squaw Peak 50 Mile Trail Run	June 1	1st	7:35:58	
Wasatch 100	September 7	2nd	20:54:18	

==== 2003 ====
Race	Date	Place	Time	Ref
Squaw Peak 50 Mile Trail Run	June 7	1st	7:45:57	
Hardrock 100 Endurance Run	July 11	1st	28:01:55	
Wasatch 100	September 6	1st	20:46:35	
The Bear 100 miler	September 26	2nd	20:20:11	

==== 2004 ====
Race	Date	Place	Time	Ref
Squaw Peak 50 Mile Trail Run	June 5	1st	7:57:01	
Silverton Alpine Marathon	August 28	1st	3:39:00	
Wasatch 100	September 11	1st	20:06:08	
Vermont 50 Miler	September 25	1st	6:59:17	

==== 2005 ====
Race	Date	Place	Time	Ref
Old Pueblo Endurance Run 50 Miler	March 5	1st	7:10:34	
Silver State 50 Miler	May 21	1st	7:35:59	
Hardrock 100 Endurance Run	July 8	1st	28:29:15	
Wasatch 100	September 10	1st	19:43:47	
The Bear 100 miler	September 23	1st	20:01:35	
San Diego 100	October 23	1st	17:24:15	

==== 2006 ====
Race	Date	Place	Time	Ref
HURT 100	January 14	1st	22:16:00	
Massanutten Mountain Trails 100	May 13	2nd	17:58:42	
Squaw Peak 50 Mile Trail Run	June 3	2nd	8:08:13	
Hardrock 100 Endurance Run	July 14	1st	27:07:55	
Wasatch 100	September 9	1st	20:18:58	
The Bear 100 miler	September 22	1st	18:35:00	
San Diego 100	October 21	1st	15:48:00	
Javelina Jundred	November 4	1st	15:25:10	

==== 2007 ====
Race	Date	Place	Time	Ref
HURT 100	January 13	1st	12:37:00	
Moab Red Hot 55k	February 17	1st	4:25:00	
McNaughton Park 100	April 14	1st	17:40:13	
Massanutten Mountain Trails 100	May 19	1st	20:11:09	
The Bighorn Mountain Wild and Scenic Trail Run 100 miler	June 15	1st	20:12:58	
Hardrock 100 Endurance Run	July 13	2nd	28:59:08	
The Bear 100 miler	September 28	1st	18:50:45	
San Diego 100	October 20	1st	17:45:50	

==== 2008 ====
Race	Date	Place	Time	Ref
Coyote Two Moon 100 miler	March 21	1st	17:24:00	
Jemez Mountain 50 miler	May 17	2nd	8:58:03	

==== 2009 ====
Race	Date	Place	Time	Ref
Moab 34 mile	February 14	3rd	4:13	
Way Too Cool 50k	March 14	20th	4:08	
Massanutten 100	May 16	1st	18:29	
Pocatello 50 mile relay (3 runners)	May 23	1st (first leg overall, 17 mi)	2:23	
Bighorn 100	June 19	1st	19:13	
Hardrock 100	July 10	1st	24:38	
Jupiter Peak Steeplechase 16 mile	August 8	20th		
Wasatch 100	September 11	2nd	19:12	
Grindstone 100	October 2	1st	18:46	
Pinhoti 100	November 7	1st	17:12	

==== 2010 ====
Race	Date	Place	Time	Ref
Moab 55k	February 13	1st	4:19:09	
Coyote Two Moon 100 miler	March 5	1st	21:02:00	

==== 2011 ====
Race	Date	Place	Time	Ref
Antelope Island Buffalo Run 100 Miler	March 25	2nd	16:06:50	
Massanutten Mountain Trails 100 Miler	May 14	1st	18:18:25	
Wasatch 100	September 9	3rd	20:59:53	
Pinhoti 100 Miler	November 5	1st	16:42:20	

==== 2012 ====
Race	Date	Place	Time	Ref
Rocky Raccoon 100 Miler	February 4	2nd	14:17:42	
Moab Red Hot 55k	February 18	3rd	4:19:43	
Antelope Island Buffalo Run 100 Miler	March 23	1st	15:28:15	
Zane Grey Highline Trail 50 Miler	April 21	3rd	9:25:30	
Pocatello 50 Miler	June 2	2nd	8:42:07	
Run Rabbit Run 100 Miler	September 15	1st	19:16:02	
Grindstone 100 Miler	October 5	1st	17:13:04	
Chimera 100 Miler and Old Goat Races	November 17	2nd	17:30:13	

==== 2013 ====
Race	Date	Place	Time	Ref
Antelope Island Buffalo Run 100 Miler	March 22	1st	14:34:00	
Run Rabbit Run 100 Miler	September 13	2nd	18:32:07	
The Bear 100 Miler	September 27	2nd	19:39:20	
WC-50 Ultra Trail Marathon 50 Miler	October 19	1st	8:24:26	

==== 2014 ====
Race	Date	Place	Time	Ref
Zion Ultra Marathon 100k	April 6	1st	9:09:40	
Massanutten Mountain Trails 100 Miler	May 17	1st	18:40:23	

==== 2015 ====
Race	Date	Place	Time	Ref
Cruel Jewel 100 Miler	May 15	1st	24:16:29	

==== 2016 ====
Race	Date	Place	Time	Ref
Lake Martin 100 Miler	March 19	1st	16:56:57	

==== 2017 ====
Race	Date	Place	Time	Ref
Zane Grey Highline Trail 100k	April 29	1st	9:32:38	
WC-50 Ultra Trail Marathon 50k	October 14	1st	5:08:48	
Pinhoti 100 Miler	November 4	1st	18:18:27	

==== 2018 ====
Race	Date	Place	Time	Ref
Lone Star 100 Miler	February 10	1st	23:38:18	
Hellbender 100 Miler	April 20	1st	21:56:00	

==== 2019 ====
Race	Date	Place	Time	Ref
Lone Star 100 Miler	February 9	2nd	23:23:42	
Ute 100 Miler	August 9–10	3rd	24:12:57	
Cloudsplitter 100 Miler	October 12–13	1st	21:16:24	
Devil Dog 100 Miler, December 7–8 – 1st, 19:21:07	December 7–8	1st	19:21:07	

==== 2020 ====
Race	Date	Place	Time	Ref
No Business 100 Miler	October 16–17	1st	19:44:41	

==== 2021 ====
Race	Date	Place	Time	Ref
Beast of the East 100 Miler	December 11	1st	21:42:13	
