= Zane Grey Highline Trail 50 Mile Run =

Ultramarathon in Tonto National Forest, Arizona, U.S.

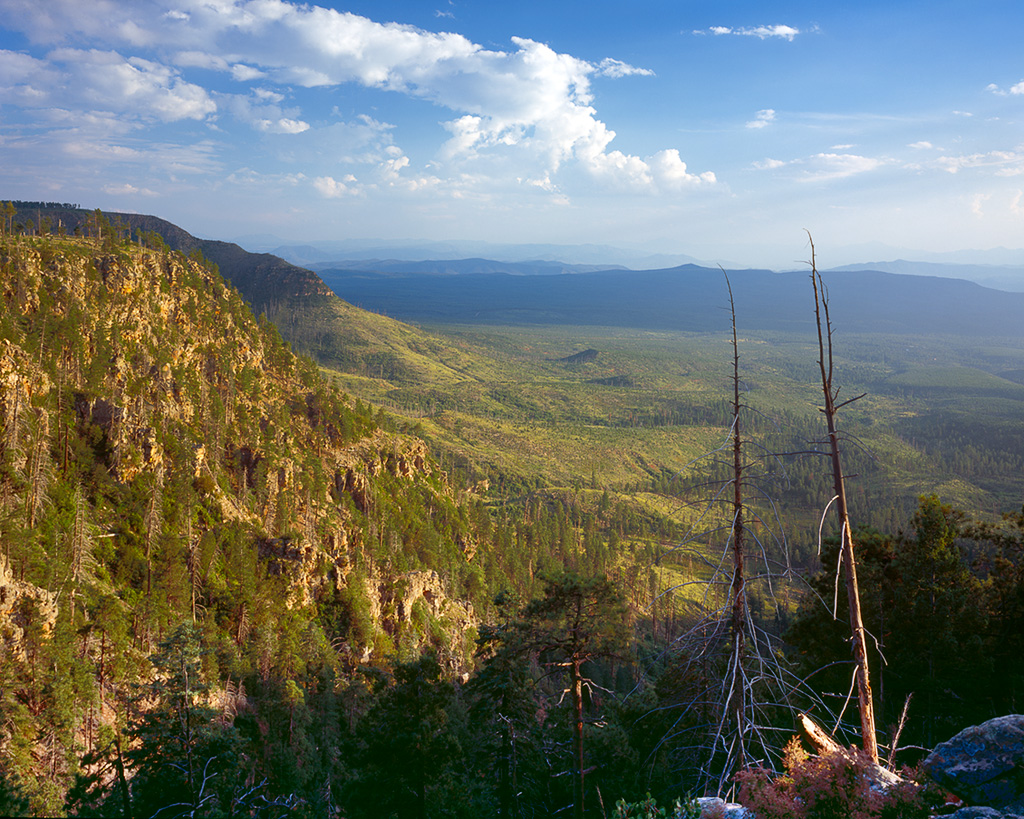
- Date: Last weekend in April
- Location: Pine, Arizona
- Event type: Ultramarathon trail run
- Distance: 50-mile (80 km)
- Established: 1990
- Course records: Men: 7:30:42 (2018); Charlie Ware; Women: 8:52:41 (2025); Sandi Nypaver
- Website: www.zanegrey50.com

The Zane Grey Highline Trail 50 mile Endurance Run, known commonly as the Zane Grey 50, is a 50-mile (80 km) ultramarathon that takes place on the Highline Trail in the Tonto National Forest just below the Mogollon Rim in central Arizona. The race is typically held on the 4th Saturday in April. The race starts at the Pine Trail head on the far west end of the Highline Trail, just south of the Town of Pine. The race travels east and finishes at the 260 Trailhead, just east of the town of Christopher Creek. Runners climb cumulative total of over 10,000 feet (3048m) and descend a total of over 9000 feet (2743m). The actual distance is closer to 55 miles. The race begins at 5:30 AM and continues through the day with the last runners finishing around 9:00 PM.

== History ==
The race was founded in 1990 by Pat McKenzie and was first completed by Scott Modzelewski in a time of 12 hours, 55 minutes. The course record is held by Charlie Ware in a time of 7:30:42, set in 2018. The women’s division course record of 8:52:41 was set in 2025 by Sandi Nypaver.

== Results ==
Seventeen runners signed up for the inaugural Zane Grey 50 mile run in 1990, only 6 finished. The following year, the course was rerouted because of the Dude Fire which burned down Zane Grey’s cabin, located just off the Highline Trail. From 1993 to 1995 the race was shortened to a 50-kilometer distance. Runners had the option to run the race on one of the two days the weekend it was held. Some runners opted to run both days. In 2007, the course was run in reverse, starting at the 260 Trailhead and travelling West to Pine. The race has an average finishing rate of 71%, making it one of the most difficult 50-mile ultra marathons in the country.

Date	Starters	Finishers	Percent	Winner	Time	Winner	Time	Notes
April 18, 2026		41		Michael Carilli	8:04:54	Callie Arndt	12:16:30	Due to grooming, course lengthened by 2 miles but less rocky
April 26, 2025		38		Avinoam Maier	8:16:43	Sandi Nypaver	8:52:41	
April 27, 2024		52		Nick Coury	8:20:00	Julie Henk	12:00:30	Starting and finishing in Christopher Creek, 50 miles wet, muddy conditions
April 27, 2024		98		Cordis Hall	4:16:13	Abby Hall	4:40:24	Starting and finishing in Christopher Creek, 28.5 miles
April 22, 2023	39	24	61.5%	Jeffrey Arbeir	12:59:15	Jessica Huppenthal	15:42:24	Point to point. Pine Th to Rim Top TH (100K distance)
April 23, 2022	83	57	68.7%	Frank Pipp	11:04:20	Darla Askew	14:08:15	Point to point. Pine Th to Rim Top TH (100K distance)
April 24, 2021	47	42	89.4%	Charlie Ware	7:47:42	Jade Belzberg	8:55:38	Out and back route from Rim Top TH (50 miles)
April 25, 2020	-	-	-					Cancelled because of COVID-19 Pandemic
April 27, 2019	128	106	82.8%	Jake Lawrence	8:38:12	Nicole Bitter	9:24:06	Out and back route from Rim Top TH (50 miles)
April 28, 2018	140	97	69.3%	Charlie Ware	7:30:42	Lauren Coury	9:32:19	Out and back route from Rim Top TH (50 miles)
April 29, 2017	147	111	75.5%	Karl Meltzer	9:32:38	Amber Reimondo	10:56:57	55 miles
April 23, 2016	133	96	72.2%	Charlie Ware	9:24:48	Bethany Lewis	9:56:26	52 miles
April 25, 2015	150	121	81.3%	René Rovera	8:28:28	Amie Blackham	11:29:40	Unusually cool weather. Rain after 12 hours.
April 26, 2014	132	93	70.5%	Ryan Smith	5:13:12	Kerrie Bruxvoort	6:15:11	*33-mi. due to hazardous cold weather
April 27, 2013	124	95	76.6%	James Bonnett	8:40:18	Kerrie Bruxvoort	10:03:58	
April 21, 2012	126	84	66.7%	Catlow Shipek	8:32:30	Paulette Zillmer	10:13:07	
April 16, 2011	128	91	71.1%	Geoff Roes	8:13:35	Andi Felton	10:36:28	
April 24, 2010	94	74	78.7%	Scott Jamie	9:40:55	Jane Larkindale	10:52:16	
April 25, 2009	111	76	68.5%	Jamil Coury	9:34:52	Nikki Kimball	9:58:18	
April 26, 2008	134	70*	52.2%	Anton Krupicka	8:02:33	Anita Ortiz	10:45:25	*+64 finishers of 50-km distance
April 28, 2007	129	91	70.5%	Kyle Skaggs	8:25:30	Emily Baer	10:33:31	Course ran in reverse
April 29, 2006	131	101	77.1%	Josh Brimhall	8:51:43	Tania Pacev	11:07:02	
April 30, 2005	125	96	76.8%	Scott Creel	8:17:20	Nikki Kimball	9:34:52	
April 24, 2004	117	83	70.9%	Dave Mackey	7:51:07	Nikki Kimball	9:14:24	Course records!
April 26, 2003	147	108	73.5%	Nate McDowell/Chad Ricklefs	8:11:44	Anthea Schmid	10:12:28	
April 27, 2002	54	49	90.7%	Karl Meltzer	8:07:00	Petra Pirc	9:54:00	
April 28, 2001	75	65	86.7%	Dennis Poolheco	8:47:53	Ruth Zollinger	10:25:51	
April 29, 2000	55	46	83.6%	Ian Torrence	8:34:33	Valerie Caldwell	11:17:47	First repeat winners
April 24, 1999	52	41	78.8%	Ian Torrence	8:31:55	Mahieu/Caldwell	11:01:39	
April 25, 1998	34	25	73.5%	Scott Jurek	8:48:50	Julie Arter	12:41:02	
April 26, 1997	22	15	68.2%	Scott Devlin	10:29:52	Judy Overholzter	19:22:43	
April 27, 1996	20	10	50.0%	Dana Miller	10:26:38	Joanne Urioste	12:46:28	
May 13, 1995	36	27	75.0%	John Loeschorn	4:48:26	Sherry Kae Johns	5:34:01	50-km distance
May 14, 1994	43	39	90.7%	Steve Christian	4:57:29	Tracey Varga	6:17:51	50-km distance
May 15, 1993	30	23	76.7%	Doug Griffen	4:53:51	Kathy Bricliffe	5:22:15	50-km distance
April 25, 1992	20	9	45.0%	Krik Apt	11:36:00	N/A	N/A	First sub-12 hour finish
April 27, 1991	20	15	75.0%	Dow Mattingly	8:25:00	Lorraine Gersitz	10:54:00	Course rerouted to FSR
May 5, 1990	17	6	35.3%	Scott Modzelewski	12:55:00	N/A	N/A	First running of Highline Trail
