= Alissa St Laurent =

Canadian ultramarathon runner

Personal information
- Born: 26 July 1984 (age 42) Mountain View, Alberta, Canada
- Years active: 2013–present

Sport
- Sport: Running
- Event: Ultramarathon
- Club: Fast Trax

Achievements and titles
- Personal bests: 125 km: 13:52; 100 km: 8:50; 100 Miles: 18:37
- Updated on 8 August 2015

Alissa St Laurent (born 26 July 1984) is a Canadian ultramarathon runner. She began her ultra career in 2013 and has competed for the Canadian National team in 100km World Championships and the 2015 IAU Trail World Championships. She holds numerous course records, including those for the Sinister 7 100-mile and the Lost Soul 100-km ultramarathons. She received national attention after becoming the first female to win the 125-km Canadian Death Race outright in 2015 and her later comments in the media encouraging more women to take up competitive sports such as ultrarunning.

== Personal life ==
St Laurent grew up in Mountain View, Alberta, and spent most of her childhood in the mountains of southern Alberta. She moved to Edmonton for work after graduating from university and trains out of Fast Trax sports store and running club in Edmonton. St Laurent is an advocate for female athletes in sports and works to encourage more young girls and women to take up competitive sports such as ultrarunning.

== Career ==
St Laurent began her ultramarathon career in 2013, one of her first races being the 50-mile Blackfoot Ultra. That same year she ran the Lost Soul 100 km in the undulating foothills outside of Lethbridge, Alberta, finishing as the top female. In her first attempt at the 125-km Canadian Death Race in August 2013, a race with over 17,000 feet (5,200 m) of elevation change, St Laurent won with a time of 16:03:37.

In 2014 St Laurent again raced Lost Soul, winning top female and setting the course record with a time of 11:00:55. The race was extremely close, with the top male finisher finishing in a course record time of 11:00:14, just 41 seconds ahead of St Laurent. In 2014 St Laurent took on her first 100-mile race with the Western States 100 in California and came 13th with a time of 22:17:43. Also in 2014 St Laurent completed the Trans Gaspe 260-km seven-day stage race in Quebec.

In 2015 St Laurent won the mountainous 100-Mile Sinister 7 race and set the female course record of 18:37:19 as well as breaking the previous male course record. The 100-mile race takes place in the mountains of Crowsnest Pass, Alberta and has over 18,658 feet (5,687 m) of elevation gain. She finished 15 minutes behind the top male finisher Dave Proctor, at one point being less than 5 minutes behind him.

St Laurent raced the Canadian Death Race in 2015, less than three weeks after winning the Sinister 7, becoming the first female in the 15-year history of the race to win outright with a time of 13:53:34.

In fall of 2015 St Laurent set the course record at the Cascade Crest 100 mile ultra in Washington at 19:25:56

== Public speaking ==
St Laurent has spoken several times in schools about ultrarunning and females in sports.
