= Jacky Hunt-Broersma =

American amputee ultramarathon runner

- Born: 1975 (age 50–51); South Africa
- Occupation: Ultramarathon runner
- Years active: 2016-present

Jacky Hunt-Broersma is an American amputee ultramarathon runner and author who was born and raised in South Africa. Hunt-Broersma lost her leg to Ewing sarcoma in 2001 when she was 26 years old. She started running in 2016. She quickly progressed from running 5 km races to running ultramarathons.

Her fastest verified marathon time is 4:57:16, achieved at the 2024 Mesa Marathon. Her fastest verified performance at the 100-mile distance is 53:41:25.

In 2019, Hunt-Broersma became the first amputee to compete in the TransRockies Mountain Stage Race in Colorado, completing the three-day option, which covers approximately 60 miles with 8,000 feet of elevation gain.

In 2020 she became the first amputee to run 100-miles on a treadmill, running it in 23hr 38m. While she originally planned to do it with an in-person race at the Umstead 100, she did so virtually due to the COVID-19 cancellations.

Hunt-Broersma hoped to run one hundred marathons in one hundred days, which would have been the world record for consecutive marathons by a woman, but British runner Kate Jayden completed her 101st marathon during Hunt-Broersma's quest, so Hunt-Broersma increased her goal to one hundred and two consecutive marathons. Hunt-Broersma ended up running 104 marathons in 104 days, finishing this in April 2022. These 104 marathons included the inaugural para athletics division of the 2022 Boston Marathon.

In 2026, Hunt-Broersma published Duct Tape and Determination about how she used running as a recovery tool following her amputation and eventually became an ultrarunner.
