= Dave Mackey =

American ultra runner (born 1969)

Dave (David) Mackey, is an American ultra runner and adventure racer who lives in Boulder, Colorado. Mackey has set course records at many significant national ultra-distance trail running races, and spent several years adventure racing nationally and internationally. He is a physician assistant in emergency medicine.

In 2011, Mackey won the Montrail Cup, which he also won in 2004. He won the Ultrarunning Magazine North American Ultrarunner of the Year in 2011, and was runner-up in 2004. He won the USA Track and Field Ultrarunner of the Year in 2004 and in 2005, and also has won several USATF national trail running titles at three different distances: 50K, 50 mile, and 100 kilometers. In running from one side of the Grand Canyon and back, also known as the rim-to-rim-to-rim (R2R2R), Mackey set a former record of 6:59:57. The current record is held by Jim Walmsley. Mackey used to hold speed climbing records in the Boulder, Colorado, area.

== Accident and injury ==
On May 23, 2015, Mackey fell off of a ridge, while training at Bear Peak near his home in Boulder. Among other injuries, he sustained a serious damage on his left lower leg. He recovered to the point he could walk (with a limp), but after a year and a half of surgeries, recurring infections and constant pain, he decided to get his ill leg amputated below the knee, hoping a prosthetic device would provide him better possibility to resume life as it was before the accident. He still competes in ultra running mountain races, as well as mountain bike and ski mountaineering races.

== Significant course records and wins ==
- Waldo 100k, course record
- Miwok 100K, three-time winner and course record holder
- American River 50 Mile, winner
- Bandera 100K, course record
- Fire Trails 50 Mile, course record
- Moab Red Hot 50k, course record
- Rock and Ice Ultra, inaugural winner
- Headlands 50K, course record
- Way Too Cool 50K, three-time winner
- Zane Grey Highline Trail 50 Mile Run, course record
- Mountain Masochist Trail Run (50 miles), 3 time-winner
