= Timothy Olson =

American ultra-runner (born 1983)

Personal information
- Born: August 28, 1983 (age 43) Amherst, Wisconsin
- Website: http://www.timothyallenolson.com/

Sport
- Country: United States
- Sport: Running
- Event: Ultramarathon
- Team: Adidas

Timothy Olson is an American ultra-runner who was the former recordholder (fastest known time) for the Pacific Crest Trail in 51 days, 16 hours and 55 minutes. He won the Western States 100 in 2012 and 2013, including the former course record of 14 hours, 46 minutes and 44 seconds in 2012.

== Personal life ==
Olson was born in Amherst, Wisconsin. While at school he took up cross-country running in order to get fit for basketball but then found running appealed to him more. After problems in his personal life, he dropped out of college but things improved when he took up coaching in Amherst. Moving with his wife Krista to Ashland, Oregon he met a group of ultra-runners and joined them in training.

== Career ==
In 2009, Olson ran his first fifty kilometer race and came in sixth. The following year, he won his first one hundred mile race. In 2011 he first attempted the Western States 100. The route goes from Olympic Valley, California to Auburn, California and attracts an international field and he completed the course in 16 hours 18 minutes to finish sixth.

In 2012, Olson won the 39th annual Western States 100 race in the record time of 14:46:44, trimming the course record of 15:07:04, set by Geoff Roes two years earlier, by over twenty minutes. He won the race again in 2013, and also competed in the Ultra-Trail du Mont-Blanc, where he came fourth with a time of 21:38:23.

In 2014, Olson won the "Male Runner of the Year" award at the Endurance Live sports awards organised by the Competitor Group, Inc.

On Thursday, July 22, 2021, Olson set a new men's supported fastest known time (FKT) on the 2,653-mile Pacific Crest Trail (PCT) in the western United States. His time of 51 days, 16 hours, and 55 minutes beat the previous record set by Karel Sabbe of 52 days, 8 hours, and 25 minutes in 2016. Olson started at the PCT's southern terminus on June 1, hiking and running an average of 51.3 miles per day. This record is now back in the hands of Karel Sabbe.
