= Ludovic Pommeret =

French ultramarathon runner

- Pommeret at Transvulcania 2017

Sport
- Events: Ultramarathon, trail running

Ludovic Pommeret is a French trail and mountain runner. Pommeret has won some of the most competitive and prestigious mountain ultramarathons in the world, including the Ultra-Trail du Mont-Blanc and Hardrock 100, where as of 2026 he is the overall course record holder.

== Running ==
Pommeret was born in Grenoble and raised in Valloire, where he grew up skiing, snowboarding and windsurfing. He first began running ultramarathons in the year 2000, but did not finish his initial attempts at races like La Fort'iche and two years (2004 and 2005) of UTMB. By 2009, he was top three at the 100 kilometer CCC (Courmayeur–Champex–Chamonix) race. In 2016, he won UTMB overall in a surprise upset, after running in 48th place in the first 50 kilometers.

Starting in 2024, Pommeret has won the Hardrock 100 three times consecutively, which is arguably the most difficult ultramarathon in the world. In 2026 at the age of 51, he also set the overall fastest time on the course with a time of 21:11:36. He has also placed top 10 at the Western States Endurance Run and won the Grand Raid.

== Personal life ==
Prior to retiring in 2025, Pommeret worked as a simulation engineer for Skyguide, the Swiss air traffic control company. Pommeret married his wife, Céline Margueron, in 2000 and has two daughters.
