= Tracy Garneau =

Canadian ultramarathon runner

Tracy Garneau is a Canadian ultramarathoner. She was the 2010 UltraRunning Female North American runner of the year.

== Running career ==
Garneau began running at age eleven in her hometown of Vernon, British Columbia. She ran several marathons before running her first ultramarathon in 2004 by competing in the Canadian Death Race. In 2008, she was part of the Canadian team which won the Transalpine-Run in the Alps. In 2009, she placed third at the 50 mile San Francisco North Face Endurance Challenge. The next year Garneau won the Western States Endurance Run in a time of 19 hours, 1 minute, and 55 seconds after coming from behind at the 80 mile mark. She qualified for the Western States by winning the American River 50-mile Endurance Run. In 2010, she also won four separate 50 mile races. She set the Hawaiian Hurt 100 course record of twenty four hours and six minutes at the 2010 race, breaking the previous record by two hours and finishing third overall.

She is sponsored by The North Face and works as a physical therapist. Garneau runs almost exclusively on trails rather than paved roads. She often cross trains by snowshoeing in sub-zero temperatures and practicing yoga.
