= Ralph Paffenbarger =

American distance runner

Ralph S. Paffenbarger, Jr. (October 21, 1922 – July 9, 2007, Santa Fe, New Mexico) was an epidemiologist, ultramarathoner, and professor at both Stanford University School of Medicine and Harvard University School of Public Health.

Paffenbarger was internationally renowned for his classic study on the improvement in longevity through regular lifetime physical activity, which confirmed prior evidence that more physically active people reduce their risk of heart disease and live longer. He published hundreds of papers on the relationship between exercise and longevity, and helped write the recommendations to exercise in the United States Surgeon General's Report on Physical Activity and Health, published in 1996.

== Early life and education ==
Paffenbarger grew up in Columbus, Ohio, the son of an Ohio State University faculty member. Paffenbarger earned his MD degree from Northwestern University Medical School during World War II, and his DrPH degree in epidemiology from Johns Hopkins University.

== Career ==
Early in his career, Paffenbarger engaged in polio research as an officer in the United States Public Health Service, focusing on the transmission and pathogenesis of polio.

In the mid 1950s, he shifted to chronic disease epidemiology and the search for causes of mental illnesses associated with childbearing, site-specific cancers, and cardiovascular-hypertensive-metabolic diseases. After being urged by then President Dwight Eisenhower's physician to investigate heart disease, he began his landmark study of the relations between physical activity, chronic disease, and longevity.

Paffenbarger spent time at Harvard and the University of California, Berkeley, where he served as adjunct professor of epidemiology, before joining the faculty at the Stanford School of Medicine in 1977. He became emeritus in 1993 in health research and policy at Stanford, after which he returned to UC Berkeley to join the department of human biodynamics.

Paffenbarger died at the age of 84, at his home in Santa Fe, New Mexico on July 9, 2007 of heart failure.

== Research ==
Over the course of almost five decades, Paffenbarger conducted some of largest and earliest scientific studies in epidemiology, which proved that increased exercise lowers the chance of death from heart disease. The study used periodic questionnaires to chronicle, over several decades, the personal characteristics, physical-activity levels, illnesses and deaths of over 50,000 college alumni. He continued to publish research findings from his studies until his own death, in 2007, at the age of 84, after a long battle with congestive heart disease.

=== College Alumni Health Study ===
In 1960, Paffenbarger began the landmark College Alumni Health Study, investigating the exercise habits of over 50,000 University of Pennsylvania and Harvard University alumni. The results of this study confirmed that more physically active people have a lower risk of coronary heart disease and live longer. Paffenbarger's Harvard alumni health study, of 17,000 male alumni who graduated between 1916 and 1950, found that when the alumni were in their forties, vigorous exercise predicted greater longevity and lower risk of cardiovascular disease, and that so long as energy expenditure was equivalent, it was irrelevant whether the exercise was carried out in a single session or broken up. The study also found that as the energy expended increased, the risk of heart disease decreased. Those who remained very active into midlife stood a much better chance of surviving than moderately exercising and inactive alumni.

The College Alumni Health Study’s preliminary findings suggested that men burning 2,0 or more calories a week significantly lowered their risk of death from heart disease compared to more sedentary peers. Paffenbarger found that, among the 640 men in the study who had died of cardiovascular disease, the death rate for the most sedentary was nearly twice that for the most active. Regular exercise, the study also confirmed in the 1990s, reduced coronary death rates by 25 percent to 33 percent.

== Running long ==
In 1967, when he was 45, Paffenbarger took up competitive running, and finished more than 150 marathon and ultramarathon events. He ran the Boston Marathon 22 times and the Western States Endurance Run five times.

== Recognition ==
In 1996, Paffenbarger was a co-recipient of the first Olympic Prize for Sports Sciences for his work showing the link between physical activity and lowered risk of heart disease.

== Publications ==
- Paffenbarger, RS; Hyde, RT; Wing, AL; Hsieh, CC (March 1986). "Physical activity, all-cause mortality, and longevity of college alumni". N. Engl. J. Med. 314: 605–13. doi:10.1056/NEJM198603063141003. PMID 3945246..
- Ralph Paffenbarger, Eric Olsen. LifeFit: An Effective Exercise Program for Optimal Health and a Longer Life, (1996) Champaign, IL: Human Kinetics, ISBN 0-87322-429-9.
- Paffenbarger, R. S.; Lee, I. M., 'A natural history of athleticism, health and longevity', Journal of Sports Sciences (1998)
- Lee, I. M., Paffenbarger, R.S., 'How much physical activity is optimal for health? Methodological considerations', Research Quarterly for Exercise and Sport (1996)
- Lee, I. M., Paffenbarger, R.S., 'Do physical activity and physical fitness avert premature mortality?' Exercise and Sport Sciences Reviews (1996)
- Paffenbarger, R. S., Lee, I. M., 'Physical activity and fitness for health and longevity', Research Quarterly for Exercise and Sport (1996)
- Blair, S. N., Wells, C. L., Weathers, R.D., Paffenbarger, R.S., 'Chronic disease: The physical activity dose-response controversy' (book chapter), Advances in Exercise Adherence (1994)
- Paffenbarger, R. S., Hyde, R. T., Dow, A., 'Health benefits of physical activity' (book chapter), Benefits of Leisure (1991)
