= Bighorn Trail Run =

Ultramarathon held in Wyoming

- Date: June
- Location: Wyoming
- Event type: Trail run
- Distance: 100 miles (160 km), 52 miles (84 km), 32 miles (51 km), 18 miles (29 km)
- Established: 1993
- Website: https://bighorntrailrun.com/

Bighorn Trail Run is an ultramarathon trail running event held annually in the Bighorn National Forest of Wyoming. Founded in 1993, it has several distances including 100 miles (160 km), 52 miles (84 km), 32 miles (51 km), and 18 miles (29 km).

== Race course and description ==
Bighorn is an out-and-back course. The 100 begins and ends near Dayton, Wyoming, and then passes through the Bighorn Mountains. The 52 mile race begins at the turnaround point for the 100. The 100 mile distance is considered one of the most difficult mountain ultras in the United States, and is a qualifier for both the Western States Endurance Run and Hardrock Hundred Mile Endurance Run.

With 20,500 feet (6,200 m) of ascent, 100 mile runners face steep and technical terrain, with the race course having been adjusted to account for heavy snow in the past. The race is also notorious for deep, shoe-sucking mud—in one year even a horse was stuck in the mud on course. Encounters with wildlife are not unheard of as well, with two-time winner Karl Meltzer having been chased by a moose.

== History ==
The Bighorn Trail Run was founded in 1993, partially as an effort by local trail runners to protect and preserve local river canyons from hydroelectric dams and other development. In 2002, the 100 mile distance was added. The Bighorn 100 is part of the "Rocky Mountain Slam", an informal series of mountain 100 milers which requires a finish at Bighorn as well as the Hardrock 100, Bear 100, and the Wasatch Front 100.
