= Anna Frost =

New Zealand runner

Personal information
- Nickname: Frosty
- Born: 1 November 1981 (age 44) New Zealand
- Website: Anna Frost

Sport
- Country: New Zealand
- Sport: Skyrunning
- Event(s): Ultramarathon; Trail running
- Team: Salomon
Medal record
Skyrunning
World Championships
Silver medal – second place	2014 Chamonix	Ultra SkyMarathon

Anna Heather Frost (born 1 November 1981) is a New Zealand trail and ultra runner.

== Running career ==
Frost turned professional in 2004 and later began running for Team Salomon.

In 2012, she won the Transvulcania ultramarathon in the Canary Islands in a record time of 8:11:31, but did not return to defend her title the next year. She finished first at the Speedgoat 50K in Utah in 2012, second at the Ultra Cavalls del Vent in the Pyrenees mountains of Spain, and first at the Maxi-Race in Annecy, France. In June 2013, she won the Trail du Colorado race in Réunion.

In 2010, Frost won the overall title in the Skyrunner World Series. The series included wins at the Table Mountain Challenge and the Three Peaks Race, among others.

In 2014, Frost won the Bear 100 Mile Endurance Run in Utah in her first attempt at the 100 mile distance. Having used the race as a qualifier for the Hardrock 100 in Colorado, she won Hardrock the following year.

Frost is sponsored by Merrell and Icebreaker, among others.

== Personal life ==
Frost is from Dunedin, New Zealand. She and her husband, Ron Braselton, had their first child in March 2019.

In 2015, the SisuGirls project began releasing a series of middle-grade books covering true stories of women in action and adventure sports. The first book in the series, Fearless Frosty, was written by Chloe Chick and focuses on Anna Frost.

== Results ==
Race of Skyrunner World Series (6 wins)

Place (F)	Course	Distance	Date	Time
Gold	(Andorra) Travessa de Canillo	12 km	6 June 2010	
Gold	(France) Chaberton Marathon	25.5 km	1 August 2010	
Gold	(Spain) Transvulcania	83 km	12 May 2012	8:11:31
Gold	(United States) Speedgoat 50K	50 km	28 Jul 2012	6:26:23
Gold	(Réunion) Trail du Colorado	38 km	16 Jun 2013	4:16:25
Gold	(Spain) Transvulcania	73 km	10 May 2014	8:10:41
Gold	(United States) Speedgoat 50K	50 km	19 Jul 2014	6:42:00
Gold	(United States) Bear 100	100 mi	26 Sep 2014	20:59:24
Gold	(United States) Hardrock 100	100 mi	10 Jul 2015	28:22:47
Gold	(United States) Hardrock 100	100 mi	15 Jul 2016	29:02:09
