= Tim Twietmeyer =

American ultramarathon runner

Personal information
- Born: November 30, 1958 (age 67) San Francisco Bay Area, California, U.S.

Sport
- Event: Ultramarathon

Tim Twietmeyer (born November 30, 1958) is an Auburn, California-based ultramarathon runner and an engineering manager at Hewlett Packard, in Roseville in the U.S. state of California. Twietmeyer is also a mountain biker, road cyclist, and retired almost-scratch golfer and swimmer. He is best known for his five victories and unprecedented 25 sub-24 hour finishes at the 100-mile (160 km) Western States Endurance Run.

== Western States 100 Miler ==
Twietmeyer is the only person to have completed the Western States Endurance Run in under 24 hours more than 25 times. His five WS100 victories came in 1992, 1994–1996, and 1998. In 2003, he completed 15 consecutive top-five finishes.

He has served on the board of trustees since 1996 and from 2006-2010 served as president of the Western States Endurance Run Foundation.

== Endurance ==
Besides the WS100, Twietmeyer has won the Eagle 100-mile (160 km) Run in Canada, and completed the Ultra-Trail du Mont-Blanc through France, Italy, and Switzerland. He has completed over 200 marathon and ultramarathon races.

=== Career highlights ===
- Western States 100: five-time champion; fifteen top-five finishes; master’s division course record holder (17:17); 25 sub-24-hour finishes
- First runner to complete the Tahoe Rim Trail (165 miles) in under two days
- 42-time finisher of the American River 50 Mile Run
- 29- time finisher of the California International Marathon
- 1997 champion and course record holder of The Eagle 100-Mile Run, Penticton, British Columbia
- Winner of several 50-mile and 50-kilometer races, including the Jed Smith 50K and Pueblo Nuevo 50-Miler
- Seven wins at the California 50-Mile Endurance Run

== Personal life ==
Tim and his wife, Kathy, have three sons.
