= Vincent Bouillard =

French ultramarathon runner

Personal information
- Born: 26 July 1993 (age 32)

Sport
- Country: France
- Events: Ultramarathon, Trail running, Skyrunning
- Team: Hoka One One

Vincent Bouillard (born July 26, 1993) is a French trail and ultramarathon runner. He gained international recognition after winning the Ultra-Trail du Mont-Blanc (UTMB) in 2024.

== Biography ==
Bouillard grew up in Annecy, in the French Alps region. He participated in track and cross-country running during his school years, though not at a highly competitive level.

== Notable race results ==
Bouillard's most significant achievement to date is his victory at the 2024 ultramarathon Ultra-Trail du Mont-Blanc (UTMB). He completed the 176.4 km course in a time of 19 hours, 54 minutes, and 23 seconds.

| Year | Competition | Venue | Position | Event |
|---|---|---|---|---|
| 2026 | Western States Endurance Run | United States of America | 1st | 100 miles (160 km) |
| 2025 | Chianti Ultra Trail by UTMB | Italy | 3rd | 74.5 miles (120 km) |
| 2024 | Ultra-Trail du Mont-Blanc (UTMB) | France, Italy, Switzerland | 1st | 100 miles (160 km) |
| 2024 | MaXi-Race du lac d'Annecy | France | 5th | 93 km |
| 2023 | Kodiak Ultra Marathons by UTMB | United States of America | 1st | 100 miles (160 km) |
| 2023 | Gorge Waterfalls | United States of America | 1st | 98.9 km |

== 2024 UTMB victory ==
Bouillard's win at the 2024 UTMB was considered a major upset in the ultrarunning world, as he entered the race as an unsponsored athlete. His winning time of 19:54:23 was the third-fastest in the race's history at that time.

== Personal life ==
Bouillard met his wife at UTMB in 2017. He works as a product engineer at Hoka One One.
