= Rajpaul Pannu =

American ultramarathon runner

Personal information
- Nationality: American
- Born: February 22, 1991 (age 34) Lancaster, California, U.S.
- Education: Saint Mary’s College of California (B.A., Political Science)
- Occupation: High-school mathematics teacher

Sport
- Sport: Ultramarathon, long-distance running
- Club: Hoka Aggies Running Club
- Team: United States (ultrarunning)

Rajpaul Singh Pannu is an American athlete.

== Early life and education ==
Rajpaul Singh Pannu was born in Lancaster and raised in Hercules in the San Francisco Bay Area. A first-generation Indian-American, he was raised by his mother after his father died of heart disease when Pannu was three.

Overweight through much of his childhood—peaking near ≈194 lb (88 kg)—he took up running to improve his health and eventually joined the cross-country team at Hercules High School, finishing 17th at the California state meet his senior year. His improvement earned him a transfer from Diablo Valley College to Saint Mary’s College of California, where he twice made the All-West Coast Conference first team and rewrote several school records before graduating in 2014.

== Teaching career ==
After college Pannu taught geometry and precalculus at Impact Academy of the Arts & Technology in Hayward, California, then joined Colorado High School Charter–GES in Denver, where he continues to teach mathematics while racing professionally. He frequently speaks about using endurance sport to model perseverance and wellness for students.

== Running career ==
=== Marathon beginnings (2017–2020) ===
Pannu debuted at the California International Marathon (CIM) on 3 December 2017, running 2 h 17 m 06 s and placing 19th overall— under the 2 h 19 m U.S. Olympic Trials standard. At the 2020 U.S. Olympic Marathon Trials in Atlanta he finished 63rd in 2 h 20 m 55 s.

=== Move to ultradistance (2021) ===
On 23 January 2021 Pannu finished second (6 h 28 m 31 s) at Project Carbon X2, becoming the third-fastest American ever for 100 km on his debut at the distance.

=== National champion (2021) ===
Eight months later he claimed the USATF 100 km Road National Championship at the Noʼtoʼmom 100 km in Sacramento, clocking 6 h 57 m 32 s.

=== Course records and trail success (2023–2024) ===
- Javelina Jundred 100 km (2023) — course record 7 h 15 m 53 s.
- Desert RATS Trail Running Festival 100 km (2024) — overall win in 9 h 19 m 35 s.

=== 2025 disqualification ===
On 15 February 2025 Pannu crossed the line first at the USATF 100-Mile Road Championships (Jackpot Ultra) in 11 h 52 m 46 s, but was later disqualified for wearing a prototype Hoka Skyward X whose 48 mm heel stack exceeded World Athletics’ 40 mm limit. Subsequent reports confirmed Cody Poskin as national champion.

== Training philosophy ==
Pannu typically logs 100–120 mi (160–190 km) per week, fitting runs around his full-time teaching schedule—often before dawn or after evening classes. He credits meditation, strength work, and a focus on consistent pacing for his success at extreme distances.

== Personal life ==
Based in Denver during the school year and the Bay Area in summer, Pannu mentors student-athletes and advocates for expanded physical-activity curricula in under-resourced schools.

== Major competitive results ==
Year	Event	Distance	Time	Place/Note
2017	California International Marathon	Marathon	2:17:06	19th overall – OTQ
2020	U.S. Olympic Marathon Trials	Marathon	2:20:55	63rd
2021	Project Carbon X2	100 km	6:28:31	2nd – #3 U.S. all-time
2021	USATF 100 km Road Championships	100 km	6:57:32	1st – National title
2023	Javelina Jundred	100 km	7:15:53	1st – Course record
2024	Desert RATS Trail Festival	100 km	9:19:35	1st overall
2025	USATF 100-Mile Road Championships*	100 mi	11:52:46	DSQ – shoe infraction

*Result annulled under USATF Rule 143-3(i) for non-compliant footwear.
