= Hardrock Hundred Mile Endurance Run =

Ultramarathon held in Colorado, US

Coordinates: 37°48′44.3″N 107°39′55.9″W

- Photo taken during 2006 race. Grant Swamp Pass, 12,900 ft (3,900 m)
- Date: July
- Location: Silverton, Colorado
- Event type: Ultramarathon trail run
- Distance: 102.5-mile (165.0 km)
- Established: 1992
- Course records: Men: François D'Haene 21:45:50 (2021, counter-clockwise); Ludovic Pommeret 21:11:36 (2026, clockwise); Women: Katie Schide 25:50:23 (2025, counter-clockwise); Courtney Dauwalter 26:03:10 (2026, clockwise)
- Website: https://www.hardrock100.com/

The Hardrock Hundred Mile Endurance Run is an ultramarathon 102.5 miles (165.0 km) in length, with 33,000 feet (10,000 m) of climb at an average elevation of over 11,000 feet (3,400 m). The race is held on a loop course on 4WD roads, dirt trails, and cross country in Southern Colorado's San Juan Range, US. The race is dedicated to the memory of the miners who settled in the area and who built the mining trails on which much of the race is run. The race is directed by Dale Garland.

== Event description ==
The run starts and ends in Silverton, Colorado and travels through the towns of Telluride, Ouray, and the ghost town of Sherman, crossing thirteen major passes in the 12,000' to 13,000' range. Entrants must travel above 12,000 feet (3,700 m) of elevation a total of 13 times, with the highest point on the course being the 14,048' summit of Handies Peak. The race has been held in early July of each year beginning in 1992, except for 1995 (too much snow), 2002 (nearby forest fires), 2019 (trail damage due to avalanche), and 2020 (global pandemic). Each year's race is run in the opposite direction of the previous year's event (2008 was run in the clockwise direction, 2009 was counter-clockwise). In order to complete the event, instead of crossing a finish line, runners are required to "kiss the Hardrock", a picture of a ram's head painted on a large block of stone mining debris.

The cut-off time for finishing the race is 48 hours. Current fast performances are held by Ludovic Pommeret (21:11:36), set in 2026 and Courtney Dauwalter (26:03:10), set in 2026. The average time to finish this race is 41:10:15, which is longer than the cutoff times of most 100-mile (160 km) races. This is due largely to the high elevations, which can cause altitude sickness or edema in some runners. In addition, the course covers extremely rugged terrain including steep scree climbs and descents, snow packs, river crossings, and boulder fields. The race starts at 6am, so runners who finish in over 40 hours see the sun set twice before finishing. Runners continue at night using flashlights or headlamps. Portions of the trail are adjacent to steep dropoffs and are described in the course description with the word "exposure".

The extreme altitude changes bring runners through several climate zones. Much of the course is above the tree line, which in Colorado is around 11,000 feet (3,400 m), and it is not uncommon for participants to go two nights in a row without sleep to finish the course.

While Hardrock is nominally a running event, many entrants use equipment typically used for hiking or mountain climbing, such as trekking poles or crampons. Weather can be very extreme in the San Juan mountains, where nighttime temperatures can drop to subzero Fahrenheit in the high elevations. Severe thunder storms can also roll in quickly, bringing rain, hail, high winds, or lightning with little warning. Thus most runners must be prepared for any type of weather. Most carry additional layers of clothing in backpacks, as well as enough food and fluids to go up to 8 hours without aid.

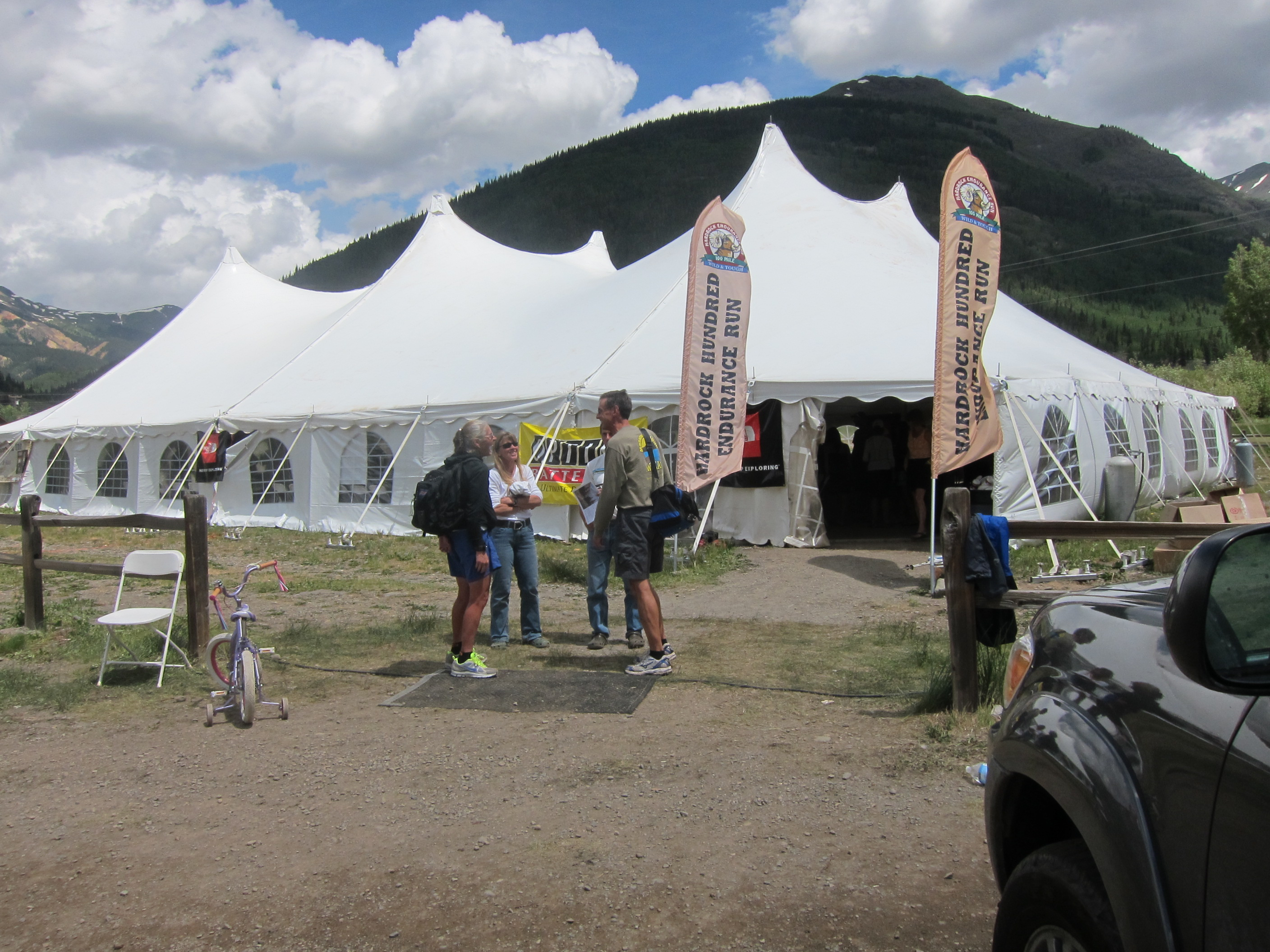
Race Headquarters Silverton, Colorado (2011)

The Hardrock 100 is the centerpiece of the "Rocky Mountain Slam", which a runner completes if they finish Hardrock plus three of four other races in the Rocky Mountains: Leadville Trail 100, the Bear 100 Mile Endurance Run, the Bighorn 100, or the Wasatch Front 100 Mile Endurance Run. The award is presented at and hosted by the Bear 100 Mile Endurance Run, as this is the final run in the series.

In 1990–1991 Gordon Hardman (Boulder and Lake City, CO), John Cappis (Telluride, CO and Los Alamos NM), and Charlie Thorn (Los Alamos, NM) began searching out other ultrarunners interested in developing a 100-mile race course through the San Juan Mountains that would include Lake City, Silverton, Telluride, and Ouray. A basic principle was that the course make use of the old mining trails as much as possible. Roads, whether they be paved, or dirt jeep tracks, have gradually been eliminated when possible to endeavor to keep the "pure trail" nature of the event intact. This event was to be not only a physical and psychological challenge to the entrants, but also a celebration of the tenacity of the miners who worked the mines in the late 1800s and early 1900s. It was envisioned as a "Post Graduate" run. Entry was limited to those who had finished other qualifying 100 mile runs.

In the early years, route following was very important. Each entrant was given a detailed course description manual and map. There were, and still are, mandatory course briefings and more detailed voluntary briefings given. Knowing the course could save a runner several hours over the duration of the run. This developed into what has become to be known as "Camp Hardrock" which comprises the two weeks preceding the actual running of the event. Runners spend this time hiking the course with the marking crews and familiarizing themselves with the route as it is to be marked. As the event has been presented over the subsequent twenty plus years, it has established a "trail", making the route finding aspect less problematic.

== Entrants ==
Each year the running field is limited to 146 qualifying candidates selected in early December by the race's Board of Directors using a weighted lottery for all candidates except the previous year's male and female winners. The exact lottery process has changed multiple times over the event's history, as the Run Committee is "always reviewing what we think is a fair mix and will continue to do so in the future."

In order to enter the lottery, prospective entrants must complete one of approximately 30 mountainous 100-mile (160 km) or longer ultramarathons in the previous 2 years (finishers of the Hardrock 100 are qualified for 3 years). A list of the races currently accepted for entry into the lottery is maintained on the Hardrock 100 website.

== Results ==
Edition	Date	Male Winner	Female Winner
1	10–12 July 1992	David Horton (USA)	Nancy Hamilton (USA)
2	9–11 July 1993	David Horton (USA) (2nd win)	Margaret Smith (USA)
3	8–10 July 1994	Scott Hirst (USA)	Margaret Smith (USA) (2nd win)
4	7–9 July 1995	Cancelled due to too much snow	
5	12–14 July 1996	Rick Trujillo (USA)	Betsy Kalmeyer (USA)
6	11–13 July 1997	Mark C. McDermott (GBR); Mark Hartell (GBR)	Laura Vaughan (USA)
7	10–12 July 1998	Ricky Denesik (USA)	Eliza McLean (USA)
8	9–11 July 1999	Blake Wood (USA)	Betsy Kalmeyer (USA) (2nd win)
9	7–9 July 2000	Kirk Apt (USA)	Sue Johnston (USA)
10	13–15 July 2001	Karl Meltzer (USA)	Betsy Kalmeyer (USA) (3rd win)
11	12–14 July 2002	Cancelled due to extreme wildfire danger	
12	11–13 July 2003	Karl Meltzer (USA) (2nd win)	Betsy Nye (USA)
13	9–11 July 2004	Paul Sweeney (USA)	Betsy Kalmeyer (USA) (4th win)
14	8–10 July 2005	Karl Meltzer (USA) (3rd win)	Sue Johnston (USA) (2nd win)
15	14–16 July 2006	Karl Meltzer (USA) (4th win)	Betsy Kalmeyer (USA) (5th win)
16	13–15 July 2007	Scott Jurek (USA)	Krissy Moehl (USA)
17	12–14 July 2008	Kyle Skaggs (USA)	Diana Finkel (USA)
18	10–12 July 2009	Karl Meltzer (USA) (5th win)	Diana Finkel (USA) (2nd win)
19	9–11 July 2010	Jared Campbell (USA)	Diana Finkel (USA) (3rd win)
20	10–12 July 2011	Julien Chorier (FRA)	Diana Finkel (USA) (4th win)
21	13–15 July 2012	Hal Koerner (USA)	Darcy Piceu Africa (USA)
22	12–14 July 2013	Sébastien Chaigneau (FRA)	Darcy Piceu Africa (USA) (2nd win)
23	11–13 July 2014	Kílian Jornet (ESP)	Darcy Piceu Africa (USA) (3rd win)
24	10–12 July 2015	Kílian Jornet (ESP) (2nd win)	Anna Frost (NZL)
25	15–17 July 2016	Kílian Jornet (ESP) (3rd win); Jason Schlarb (USA)	Anna Frost (NZL) (2nd win)
26	14–16 July 2017	Kílian Jornet (ESP) (4th win)	Caroline Chaverot (FRA)
27	20–21 July 2018	Jeff Browning (USA)	Sabrina Stanley (USA)
28	2019	Cancelled due to weather	
29	2020	Cancelled due to COVID-19	
30	16–17 July 2021	François D'Haene (FRA)	Sabrina Stanley (USA)
31	15–16 July 2022	Kilian Jornet (ESP) (5th win)	Courtney Dauwalter (USA)
32	14–15 July 2023	Aurélien Dunand-Pallaz (FRA)	Courtney Dauwalter (USA) (2nd win)
33	12–14 July 2024	Ludovic Pommeret (FRA)	Courtney Dauwalter (USA) (3rd win)
34	11–13 July 2025	Ludovic Pommeret (FRA) (2nd win)	Katie Schide (USA)
35	10-11 July 2026	Ludovic Pommeret (FRA) (3rd win)	Courtney Dauwalter (USA) (4th win)
