= Miwok 100K Trail Race =

Annual ultramarathon in California, U.S.

- Miwok 100K Logo
- Date: first Saturday in May
- Location: Stinson Beach, California
- Event type: Trail / Dirt Road
- Distance: 62.2 miles (100.1 km)
- Established: 1996
- Course records: Men: 7:53:19 (2008); Dave Mackey; Women: 8:55:49 (2001); Ann Trason
- Website: miwok100k.com

The Miwok 100K Trail Race is a 62.2 miles (100.1 km) long ultramarathon that takes place annually in southern Marin County, California, typically on the first Saturday of May.

The race starts and ends in the town of Stinson Beach. Almost all of the course is on fire roads and single-track trails, first to the south of Stinson Beach and then to the north. Runners climb a total of approximately 11,800 feet (3,600 m).

The race begins at 5:00 a.m. The overall time limit for the race is 15 hours, 30 minutes.

The race, created by Kellie Sheehan and directed since 2004 by Tia Bodington, has been held every year since 1996 except 2020 and 2021, when it was canceled as a result of the COVID-19 pandemic. For its first four years (1996–1999), the race was known as the "What? Mi-Wok? Trail 100K". In 2012, the race's start/finish location was moved several miles northwest from Rodeo Beach to its present location at Stinson Beach. The resulting course changes were significant enough that the race organizers maintain two sets of records: 1996–2011 and 2012–present. The event was shortened to 60K for 2013 due to fire restriction trail closures in the Mount Tamalpais area.

300 to 400 runners have started the race each year since 2008. The course record (Rodeo Beach course) of 7 hours, 53 minutes, 19 seconds was set by Dave Mackey in 2008. The women's course record of 8 hours, 55 minutes, 49 seconds was set by Ann Trason in 2001.

== See also ==
- List of annual foot races in California
- Miwok
