= Josh Cox =

American long-distance runner

Personal information
- Born: 9 August 1975 (age 51)
- Height: 6 ft 0 in (1.83 m)
- Weight: 160 lb (73 kg)

Josh Cox (August 9, 1975) is an American former long-distance runner. He is the former American record holder in the 50k.

Cox, a four-time US Olympic Marathon Trials qualifier and three-time U.S. National Team member, has been the top American marathon finisher at the World Track & Field Championships. Cox was named the USA Track & Field Athlete of the Week in January 2009 for breaking the 50k record by four minutes at Arizona's Rock ‘n’ Roll Marathon, and again in January 2011 for winning the P.F.Chang's Rock ‘n’ Roll Arizona Marathon, en route to breaking his own 50k American Record by three and a half minutes, running the second fastest time in history, and missing the world record by 7 seconds. In 2009 and 2011, Cox's 50k time was the fastest in the world.

Cox set a course record at the 1997 Mountain Masochist 50-mile trail run in Virginia at the age of 22; at 23, he ran his first marathon (2:19), making him the youngest qualifier for the 2000 Olympic Marathon Trials. In his 4th Olympic Marathon Trials in 2012 Cox finished in 14th place with a time of 2:13:50, a new personal best by one second.

His other running accomplishments include a course record at the 2007 Air Force Marathon, winning the 2008 Rocket City Marathon, and a runner up finish at the 2009 California International Marathon, (2:13). In April 2010, the day before the Boston Marathon, Cox won the Boston Athletic Association 5k. A week later he won the Rock ‘n’ Roll Half Marathon in Nashville, Tennessee. In December 2010 Cox won the Zappos.com Rock ‘n’ Roll Las Vegas Marathon.

Outside of his 140-mile week training regimen, Cox has starred on ABC's Bachelorette show, and, for the past four years, has offered his perspective for NBC Universal Sports.

Cox is active as a speaker and writer. He is a contributing author to the Chicken Soup for the Soul series.

Cox grew up in El Cajon, California which is in East San Diego county. He played soccer, ran cross-country and competed in track and field events at Christian High School San Diego and graduated in 1993. He also attended Virginia's Liberty University and graduated in 1998. He currently lives in Mammoth Lakes, California where he coaches the Mammoth Track Club.

== See also ==
- Marathon
- Ultramarathon
