= Grand Raid =

Annual ultramarathon in Réunion Island

Grand Raid Réunion Diagonale des Fous
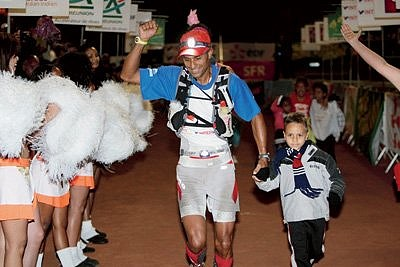
- arrival at 2011 edition
- Genre: Ultra-marathon
- Date: October
- Frequency: annually
- Location: (France) Réunion
- Inaugurated: 1989
- Participants: 2350 competitors
- Website: grandraid-reunion.com

The Grand Raid de la Réunion, also called La diagonale des fous (The Bishops'/Madmen's Diagonal) is a mountain ultramarathon race. The race takes place annually in October on Réunion island, a French overseas department in the Indian Ocean, situated between Madagascar and Mauritius. The 166 kilometres (103 miles) route with 10,000 metres (33,000 ft) of elevation gain is reputed to be highly challenging, brutally difficult and one of the hardest footraces in the world.

== Category of course ==
Three races are held at the same time:

- the Grand-Raid or Diagonale des Fous — 162 kilometres (101 mi) with 9,643 metres (31,637 ft) of altitude gain
- the Semi-Raid or Trail of Bourbon — 93 kilometres (58 mi) with 4,920 metres (16,140 ft) of gain
- Mascareignes Raid — 61 kilometres (38 mi) with 3,036 metres (9,961 ft) of gain

== Dates of races in 2017 ==
- 25th edition of the Diagonale des fous: 19 to 22 October
- 18th edition of the Trail de Bourbon: October
- 7th edition of the Mascareignes: October

== Death ==
This race has recorded three deaths since its inception. The 2002 edition was marked by the death of Gérard Bordage in the descent of the Kerveguen hillside and that of the Dutchman Guus Smit in the rampart of the Roche Écrite; while that of 2012 sees the death of Thierry Delaprez after a fall in a ravine at the Col de Fourche.

== Winners ==
Year	Distance	Men's Winner	Time	Women's Winner	Time
2026	180 km	Hugo Deck (FRA)	22:54:19	Ruth Croft (NZL)	27:13:23
2025	178 km	Baptiste Chassagne (FRA)	23:31:54	Blandine L Hirondel (FRA)	27:26:09
2024	174.7 km	Mathieu Blanchard (FRA)	23:25:02	Manon Bohard (FRA)	31:49:55
2023	165 km	Aurélien Dunand-Pallaz (FRA)	23:21:23	Katie Schide (USA)	27:31:08
2022	165.7 km	Beñat Marmissolle (FRA)	20:14:36	Courtney Dauwalter (USA)	21:37:36
2021	168 km	Daniel Jung (ITA); Ludovic Pommeret (FRA)	23:02:21	Emilie Maroteaux (FRA)	29:54:59
2019	170 km	Grégoire Curmer (FRA)	23:33:45	Sabrina Stanley (USA)	30:49:39
2018	165 km	Benoît Girondel and François D'Haene (FRA)	23:18:48	Jocelyne Pauly (FRA)	29:54:26
2017	165 km	Benoît Girondel (FRA)	23:53:53	Andrea Huser (SUI)	26:34:52
2016	167 km	François D'Haene (FRA)	23:44:67	Andrea Huser (SUI)	27:44:13
2015	167 km	Antoine Guillon (FRA)	24:17:40	Núria Picas (SPA)	29:11:14
2014	172 km	François D'Haene (FRA)	24:25:02	Nathalie Mauclair (FRA)	31:27:28
2013	163.5 km	François D'Haene (FRA)	22:58:00	Nathalie Mauclair (FRA)	29:45:32
2012	170 km	Kílian Jornet Burgada (ESP)	26:33:10	Émilie Lecomte (FRA)	33:03:17
2011	161.8 km	Julien Chorier (FRA)	23:56:35	Karine Herry (FRA)	31:43:30
2010	161.8 km	Kílian Jornet Burgada (ESP)	23:17:26	Marcelle Puy (FRA)	31:48:50
2009	148 km	Julien Chorier (FRA)	22:09:08	Emilie Lecomte (FRA)	29:58:41
2008	148 km	Pascal Parny (FRA)	21:40:48	Marcelle Puy (FRA)	26:20:40
2007	150 km	Thierry Chambry (FRA)	23:33:41	Marcelle Puy (FRA)	29:05:46
2006	148 km	Christophe Jaquerod (FRA)	20:39:40	Karine Herry (FRA)	26:33:46
2005	140 km	Charles Fontaine (FRA)	19:49:36	Sandrine Beranger (FRA)	27:24:57
2004	140 km	Richeville Esparon (FRA)	20:00:57	Alexandra Rousset (FRA)	27:58:41
2003	130 km	Richeville Esparon (FRA)	19:11:27	Simone Kayser (LUX)	25:59:16
2002	125 km	Thierry Técher (FRA)	17:55:21	Marcelle Puy (FRA)	20:54:28
2001	125 km	Pascal Parny (FRA)	16:01:00	Corinne Favre (FRA)	20:56:00
2000	125 km	Gilles Diehl (FRA); Thierry Técher (FRA)	16:43:00	Corinne Favre (FRA)	23:25:58
1999	125 km	Cléo Libelle (FRA)	17:50:00	Mireille Sery (FRA)	24:44:00
1998	125 km	Cléo Libelle (FRA)	17:45:00	Corinne Favre (FRA)	22:51:00
1997	125 km	Patrick Maffre (FRA)	15:37:35	Corinne Favre (FRA)	24:35:45
1996	123 km	J.Philippe Marie-Louise (FRA)	16:19:27	Josiane Catois (FRA)	23:06:05
1995	121 km	J.Philippe Marie-Louise (FRA)	14:41:00	Marcelle Puy (FRA)	24:59:00
1994	130 km	J.Philippe Marie-Louise (FRA)	19:29:00	Mireille Sery (FRA)	30:47:00
1993	129 km	Patrick Maffre (FRA)	16:03:00	Régine Etienne (FRA)	27:26:00
1992		J.Philippe Marie-Louise (FRA)	17:20:00	Mireille Sery (FRA); Thérèse Derolez (FRA)	29:21:00
1991		Gilles Trousselier (FRA); Patrick Maffre (FRA)	19:28:00	Marie Annick Laudes (FRA)	33:09:00
1990		Gilles Trousselier (FRA)	17:11:00	Guylène Calpetard (FRA)	31:58:00
1989		Gilles Trousselier (FRA)	16:02:00	Marie Thérèse Maussion (FRA)	25:40:00

== Related books ==
- "Grand Raid Reunion Island", a 68 pages comic book edited by UltraBD
