= Andrea Huser =

Swiss mountain biker (1973–2020)

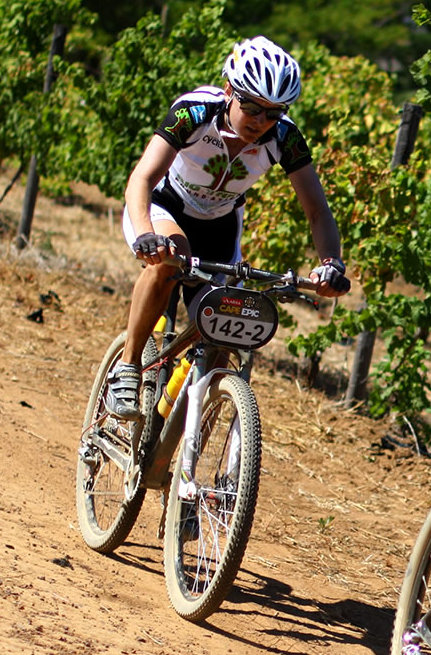

Personal information
- Born: 11 December 1973 Switzerland
- Died: 28 November 2020 (aged 46) Saas-Fee, Switzerland

Cycling career
- Sport: Cycling
- Discipline: Mountain bike racing
- Rider type: Marathon

Major wins
- Swiss champion in cycling marathon (2004)

Andrea Huser (11 December 1973 – 28 November 2020) was a Swiss mountain bike racer and trail runner.

She won the Grand Raid twice, in 2016 and 2017.

Huser fell to her death on 28 November 2020 while training in the Saas-Fee area. She was reported missing later that day and her body was recovered the next day.

== Titles ==
2004

- Switzerland Swiss champion in cycling marathon
