= American River 50 Mile Endurance Run =

The American River 50 Mile Endurance Run, or AR50, is the second largest 50-mile (80.47 kilometer) ultramarathon beginning in Sacramento, California and ending in Auburn, California. The event is held annually in April.

For most of the first 19 miles (31 km), the course follows a bike path that runs along the American River, then switches to trails for the remainder of the race.

== Awards ==
In addition to 1st, 2nd, and 3rd place awards in each age division, all runners who cross the finish line in less than 14 hours are awarded a special finisher's jacket.

Also, the Dick Collins Legend Award is presented at the finish of the AR50.

== History ==
The race was first held in 1980 with 200 participants. For its first two years, the starting line was in Auburn and runners finished in Sacramento. In 1982, this was reversed and the race has started in Sacramento.

The 2010 race was won by Geoff Roes and Tracy Garneau.

== Records ==
The course record for the Sacramento to Auburn run for men was set in 1994 by Tom Johnson at 5 hours, 33 minutes, and 21 seconds. The women's record, achieved by Ann Trason in 1993, is 6 hours, 9 minutes, and 8 seconds.

Gloria Takagishi is the only person to have completed the race every year in its 30-year history.
