= François D'Haene =

French trail runner

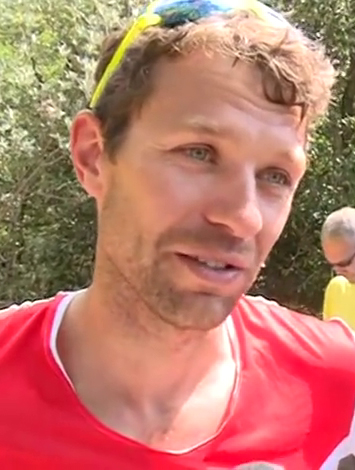
François D'Haene in 2016

François D'Haene (born 24 December 1985 in Lille) is a French elite athlete who specializes in ultra running and mountain running.

He won the Ultra-Trail du Mont-Blanc in 2012, 2014, 2017 and 2021. and the Grand Raid on Réunion in the Indian Ocean in 2013, 2014 and 2016. He is the winner of the first Ultra-Trail World Tour, in 2014. He holds the speed record for the Ultra Trail du Mont Blanc (UTMB), 167 km in 20 h 11 min 44 sec, a record that he improved in 2017 (170 km in 19 h 01 min 32 s).

On 17 October 2017, he set a new record on the John Muir Trail in California's Sierra Nevada, finishing it in 2 days, 19 hours, and 26 minutes.

On 17 July 2021, D'Haene won the Hardrock 100 mile ultramarathon in 21:45:51; breaking both the counter clockwise and overall record, both previously held by Kilian Jornet. In August of the same year, he won the UTMB (Ultra-Trail de Mont-Blanc) in 20:45:59.

In June 2016, D'Haene set a record time for the GR 20 in Corsica of 31 hours and 6 minutes. In 2021, this record was broken by Lambert Santelli with a time of 30 hours 25 minutes. In July 2026, D'Haene retook the record with a time of 29 hours and 46 minutes.

He used to be a physiotherapist, and became a wine-grower in 2012. He is married and has three children, and lives in the Beaujolais winemaking region.
