= Cascade Crest 100 =

Ultramarathon held in Washington state

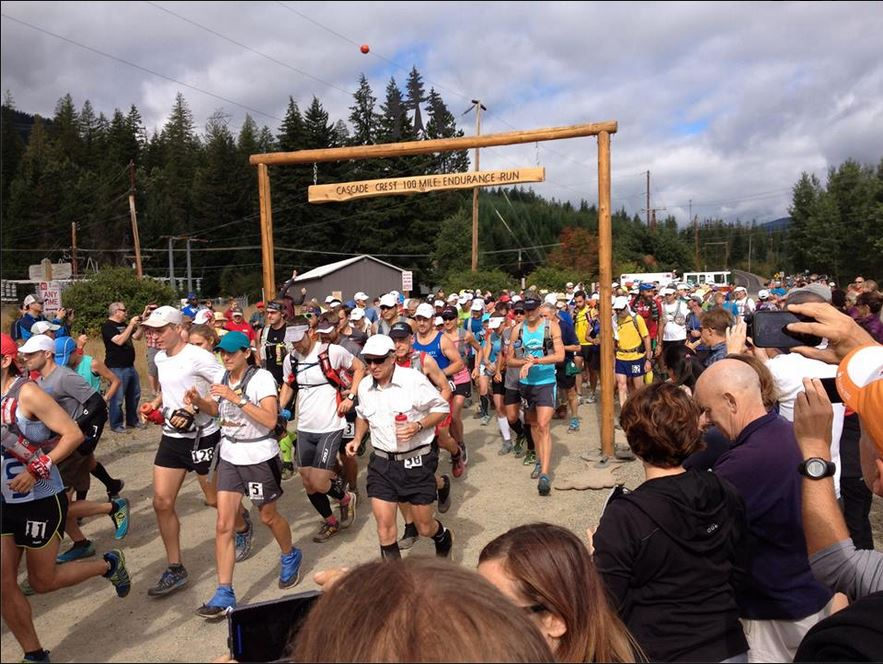
- The start of 2013 race
- Location: Washington state
- Event type: Trail run
- Distance: 100 miles (160 km)
- Established: 1999
- Website: http://www.cascadecrest100.com/

Cascade Crest 100 is an ultramarathon race held in Washington state. Founded in 1999, it is 100 miles (160 km) in length with over 23,000 feet (7,000 m) of elevation gain. It is considered one of the most challenging mountain trail ultras in the United States, and is a qualifier for both the Western States Endurance Run and Hardrock Hundred Mile Endurance Run.

Starting and finishing in Easton, Washington, Cascade Crest is a loop within the Cascade Mountains. Rugged and steep, the course includes many difficult sections including a rope-assisted descent, a 2.3 mile railroad tunnel, and some notoriously overgrown sections of trail. Randy Gehrke founded the race in 1999, and the course most recently changed in 2016 to include additional elevation gain.
