= Highline National Recreation Trail =

Hiking trail in Arizona

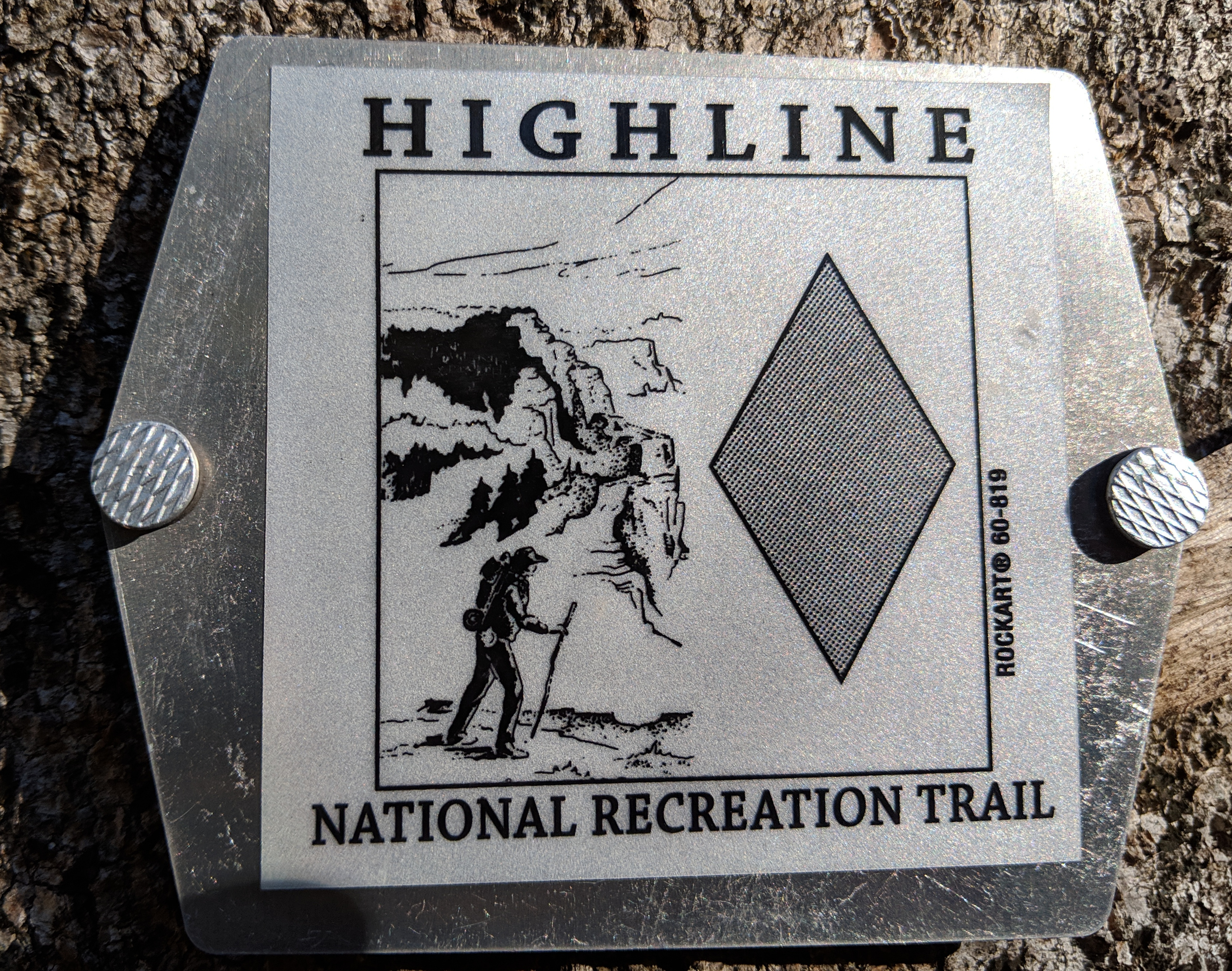
- Trail marker for the Highline National Recreation Trail.
- Length: 54.7 mi (88.0 km)
- Location: Tonto National Forest, Arizona, United States
- Established: 1870

The Highline National Recreation Trail is a 54.7-mile (88.0 km) trail that runs below the Mogollon Rim in the Tonto National Forest in Arizona. The trail overlooks several rim canyons, brushy hills, distant mountains, rock formations, and stands of Ponderosa pine. The trail was established in 1870 and was used to travel between homesteads and to attend school in Pine, Arizona. Zane Grey (who had a cabin in the area) and Babe Haught used the Highline Trail while hunting, and the Zane Grey Highline Trail 50 Mile Run ultramarathon takes place on the trail. The portion of the Highline Trail from the Washington Park Trailhead to the Pine Trailhead is part of the Arizona Trail passage 26.

Sections of the trail have been burned multiple times, including by the deadly Dude Fire in 1990, and the Highline fire in 2017, where part of the trail was used as a firebreak. The eastern part of the trail underwent significant maintenance an improvement between 2012 and 2018.
