= Katie Schide =

American ultramarathon runner

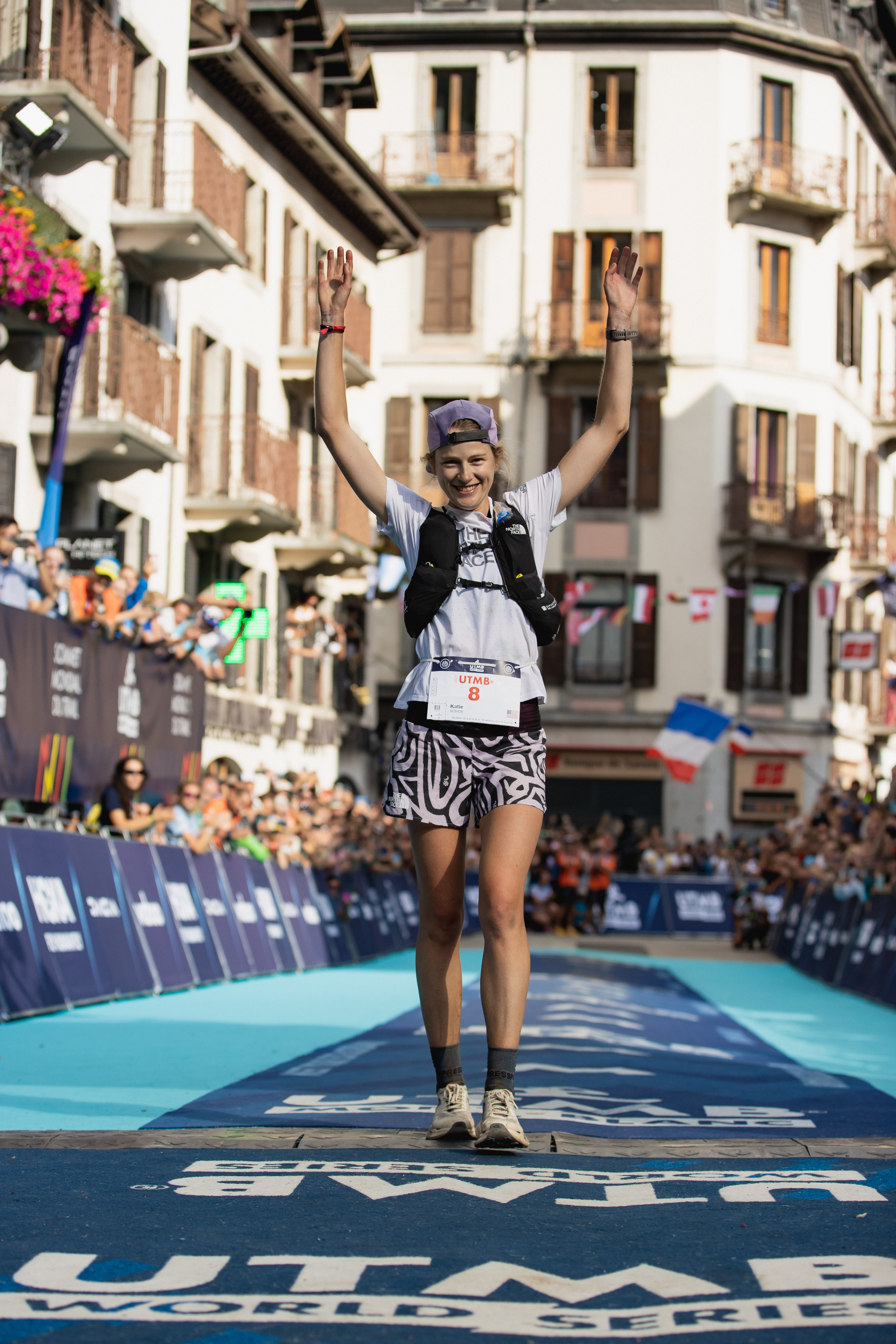
- Schide at the finish of UTMB in 2022, where she placed first

Personal information
- Born: January 24, 1992 (age 34) Gardiner, Maine, US

Sport
- Events: Ultramarathon, trail running

Katie Schide (born January 24, 1992) is an American professional trail and mountain runner living in France. Schide has won some of the most prestigious 100-mile ultramarathons in the world, including the Ultra-Trail du Mont-Blanc, the Grand Raid de la Réunion (La diagonale des fous), the Western States Endurance Run, and the Hardrock Hundred Mile Endurance Run.

== Biography ==
Schide was born and raised in Gardiner, Maine. She grew up hiking and playing field hockey, and later worked at mountain huts in the White Mountains.

She attended Middlebury College as a geology major, and began racing trails as a master's student at the University of Utah. Schide completed her PhD in geology at ETH Zurich in 2022, where she studied landslides and erosion caused by earthquakes. Since 2019, she has lived in the small alpine village of Saint-Dalmas-le-Selvage in France. In addition to ultramarathons, Schide races skimo.

== Notable race results ==
Schide has won or had podium finishes at many of the largest and most competitive ultramarathons in the world. In 2024, she broke the Ultra-Trail du Mont-Blanc women's course record, completing the course in 22 hours, 9 minutes and 31 seconds ― 21 minutes faster than the previous course record held by fellow American runner Courtney Dauwalter.

In 2025, she broke the Hardrock Hundred Mile Endurance Run women's counter-clockwise course record, completing the course in 25 hours, 50 minutes and 23 seconds ― 21 minutes faster than the previous course record held by fellow American runner Courtney Dauwalter. With this, Schide became the first woman to complete Hardrock in less than 26 hours.

Year	Competition	Venue	Position	Event
2025	Hardrock Hundred Mile Endurance Run	(United States) Colorado	1st	100 miles (160 km)
2024	Ultra-Trail du Mont-Blanc (UTMB)	Switzerland, Italy, France	1st	100 miles (160 km)
2024	Western States Endurance Run	(United States) California	1st	100 miles (160 km)
2024	The Canyons Endurance Runs by UTMB	(United States) California	1st	100 kilometres (62 miles)
2023	Le Grand Raid De La Réunion - La Diagonale des Fous	(France) La Réunion	1st	170 kilometres (110 miles)
2023	UTMB - Orsieres-Champex-Chamonix (OCC)	Switzerland, France	2nd	53 kilometres (33 miles)
2023	Western States Endurance Run	(United States) California	2nd	100 miles (160 km)
2023	Trail Des Balcons d'Azur	France	1st	44.9 kilometres (27.9 miles)
2023	EcoTrail Paris	France	1st	80 kilometres (50 miles)
2022	Ultra-Trail du Mont-Blanc (UTMB)	Switzerland, Italy, France	1st	100 miles (160 km)
2022	Val d'Aran by UTMB - CDH	Catalonia, Spain	1st	105 kilometres (65 miles)
2022	Greenweez MaXi-Race	France	1st	40 kilometres (25 miles)
2021	Swissalpine Davos - K43	Switzerland	1st	42.9 kilometres (26.7 miles)
2021	La Sportiva Lavaredo Ultra Trail	Italy	2nd	121.2 kilometres (75.3 miles)
2021	Ergysport Trail Du Ventoux	France	1st	45.8 kilometres (28.5 miles)
2021	Le Porte di Pietra	Italy	2nd	72.5 kilometres (45.0 miles)
2020	Ultra Trail Cote d'Azur Mercantour (UTCAM)	France	1st	133.6 kilometres (83.0 miles)
2020	Ubaye Trail Salomon	France	1st	40.8 kilometres (25.4 miles)
2019	Madeira Island Ultra Trail	Madeira	2nd	115 kilometres (71 miles)
2018	UTMB - Courmayer/Champex/Chamonix (CCC)	Switzerland, Italy, France	2nd	100 kilometres (62 miles)
