= Laura Vaughan =

British professor

Laura Vaughan is a professor of urban form and society at the Bartlett School of Architecture, University College London. In 2018, she appeared on BBC Radio 4's Thinking Aloud to discuss her book Mapping Society: The Spatial Dimensions of Social Cartography.

== Selected publications ==
- Suburban Urbanities: Suburbs and the Life of the High Street. UCL Press, London, 2015. (Edited) (free pdf download)
- Mapping Society: The Spatial Dimensions of Social Cartography. UCL Press, London, 2018. (free pdf download)
