= Geoff Roes =

American ultra-marathon runner

Personal information
- Nationality: United States
- Born: April 14, 1976 (age 50)
- Years active: 2006 - 2012

Sport
- Sport: Ultramarathon

Geoff Roes (born April 14, 1976 in central New York) is an American ultramarathon runner.

== Background ==
Roes grew up in Cleveland, New York, near Oneida Lake and northeast of Syracuse. As a student at Paul V. Moore High School in Central Square, New York, he excelled in track and cross country. He competed in cross-country at Syracuse University for one season before being continually injured.

== Running career ==
Roes began running ultramarathons after moving to Alaska in 2005. In 2006, Roes entered his first ultramarathon, the Little Susitna 50 in Big Lake, Alaska, a race held in conjunction with the Susitna 100, which Roes' girlfriend was biking. He won the race.

In 2009, Roes won the HURT 100 Mile and Bear 100 Mile Endurance Run. He also won the Wasatch Front 100 Mile Endurance Run in a record time of 18:30:55, beating Kyle Skaggs' previous course record by nearly one hour and five minutes. As of 2026, Roes' Wasatch 100 record is still standing.

In 2010, Roes won the American River 50 Mile Endurance Run, which begins in Sacramento, California. He also won the 2010 Western States Endurance Run in Auburn, California in a record time of 15:07:04, edging out Anton Krupicka and Kilian Jornet. He broke the race record which was set in 2004 by seven-time Western States winner Scott Jurek. Roes' 2010 Western States win was documented in Unbreakable: The Western States 100 (2012).

Roes was voted Male Ultrarunner of the Year in 2009 and 2010 by Ultra Running Magazine.

In 2012, Roes won the 350-mile Iditarod Trail Invitational held in Alaska. He stopped running competitively shortly after that event.

Between 2012 and 2016, Roes wrote a column for iRunFar. In 2013, he published an article detailing his struggle with overtraining syndrome and its impact on his running. In a subsequent article published in 2014, Roes explained that he had not felt "normal" since 2012 but was improving.

== Personal life ==
Roes lives in Juneau, Alaska. Between 2010 and 2020, he organized an annual ultrarunning camp in Juneau. Roes has worked a "hodgepodge of jobs" and as of 2020 was coaching middle and high-school cross-country and youth snowshoeing.
