= Javelina Jundred =

Ultramarathon held in Arizona, USA

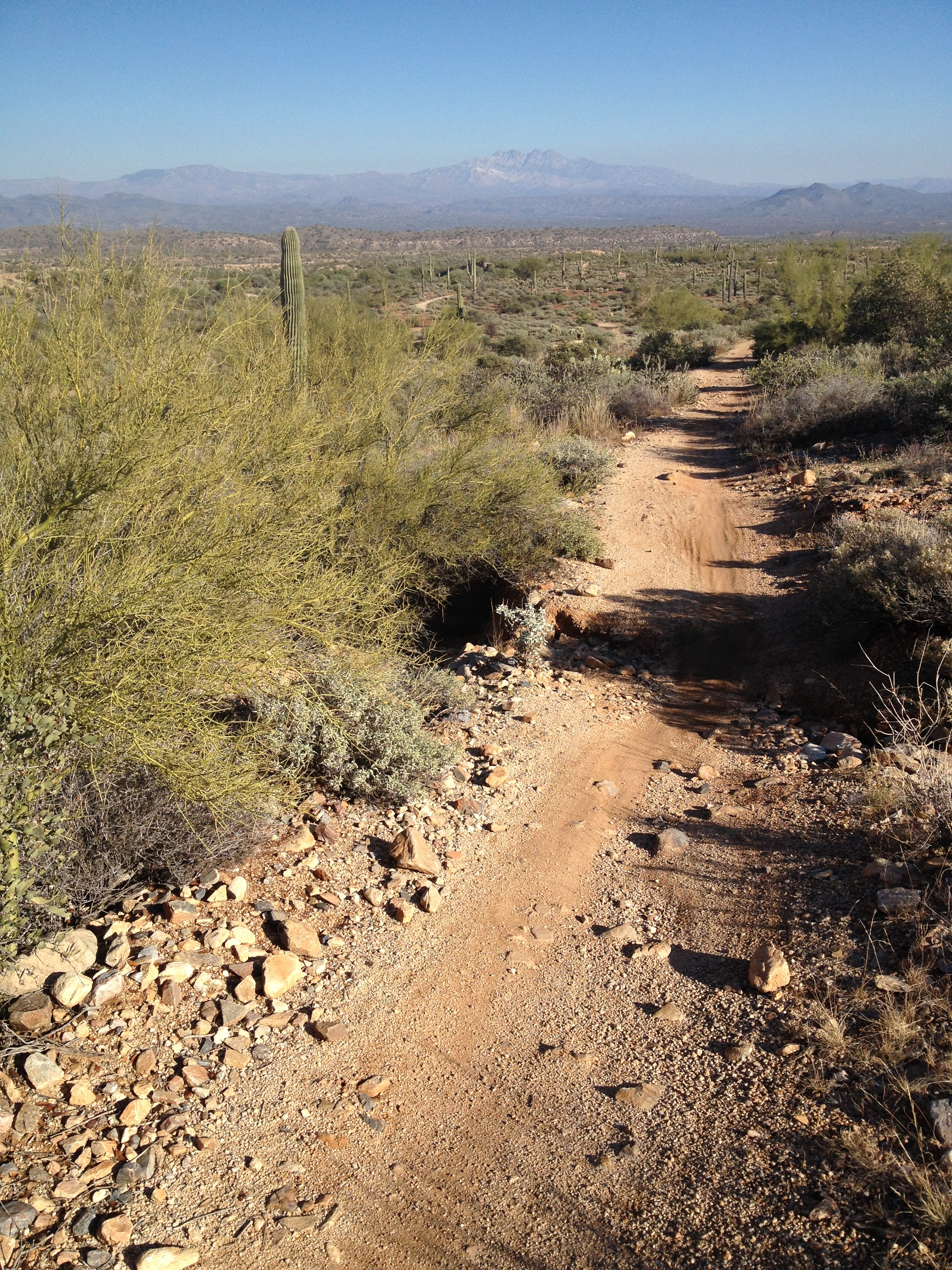
- The Pemberton Trail, which makes up about 15 miles of the course
- Date: October
- Location: Fountain Hills, Arizona
- Event type: Ultramarathon trail run
- Distance: 100-mile (160 km)
- Established: 2002
- Website: https://www.aravaiparunning.com/javelina/

Javelina Jundred is a 100 mile (160 km) ultramarathon held by Aravaipa Running at McDowell Mountain Regional Park in Fountain Hills, Arizona. Founded in 2002, it is one of the most popular ultramarathons in the United States, with over 850 runners as of 2023. The course also hosts two races over shorter distances, a 100-kilometre (62 mi) race and a 31-kilometre (19 mi) race. The race is named for the javelina.

== Race course and description ==
Javelina Jundred is unique among top 100 mile races in that the course consists of loops that all begin and end at race headquarters. Hundred mile runners complete a total of five loops, one of 22.3 miles (35.89 km) followed by four of 19.45 miles (31.30 km), a total of 100.1 miles (161.10 km). The 100 km race consists of the long loop and two laps of the shorter loop for a total of 98.49 kilometres (61.2 mi). The 31 km race is one loop of 19.45 miles (31.30 km). The course is relatively flat and fast for a trail ultramarathon, with 7,900 feet (2,400 m) of cumulative vertical gain for the hundred-mile distance.

Though fall temperatures are relatively cool for the Sonoran Desert, the course is nevertheless completely without shade and daytime temperatures can reach up into the 90s (32–37 °C). Heat is often one of the top reasons for runners to drop out from the race, though at night temperatures fall rapidly.

Held in late October around Halloween weekend, the race has a unique culture with many runners wearing costumes, and unconventional awards such as best costume and best ass. Race organizers typically warn participants and crew that the race is "R rated". Despite the festive atmosphere, the race has recently attracted a competitive field of elite runners, due to the fast course and the fact that it is a qualifier for the Western States Endurance Run, with the top men and women finishers earning a "Golden Ticket" automatic entry.

== History ==
Founded by Geri Kilgraff in 2002, the inaugural race had 180 runners. The 100 km race was added for the 2007 event. By 2008, the race was organized by Jamil Coury of Aravaipa Running. By 2014, the race had around 700 runners and instituted a waitlist for entrants. Two shorter races were added for the 2018 event, the 31 km race and a 62 km race. The 62 km race was only run that year, while the 31 km race has remained and has been named the Jackass 31K since the second race in 2019. In 2025, the race welcomed 1,650 runners across the three race distances: 950 runners for the Javelina 100 Mile, 450 for the Javelina 100K, and 250 for the Jackass 31K.

In 2026, Cassandra De Winter won the Javelina 100K race outright in 7:44:45, the third-fastest ever time on the course, and taking more than 28 minutes off the previous women's record.

=== Course records ===
Distance	Runner	Time	Category	Year
100 mile	Will Murray	12:10:12	Men	2025
100 mile	Tara Dower	13:31:47	Women	2025
100 km	Rajpal Pannu	7:19:05	Men	2023
100 km	Cassandra De Winter	7:44:45	Women	2026
