= Harvard alumni health study =

The Harvard alumni health study is a cohort study focusing on the effect of exercise on coronary artery disease, strokes, diabetes, hypertension, cancer, obesity and mortality. Including only male, Harvard College graduates who began their studies between 1916 and 1950 and were still living in 1966, the study began with 21,582 individuals. Data was collected on the lifestyle and health of these men in 1962, 1966, 1977, 1988, and 1993, at which point only 11,894 men remained in the study.

As with all cohort studies, the narrow catchment criteria for participants was both a strength and a weakness: selecting only educated, middle-aged, predominantly white males lent the study greater power to see statistically significant results in that demographic, but left it blind to broader reaching phenomena. Fit people did better and had less disease than unfit people. If people changed from unfit to fit their disease risk went down.
