= Kettle Moraine 100 Endurance Runs =

American ultramarathon

The Kettle Moraine 100 is an ultramarathon held annually in early June in Kettle Moraine State Forest near La Grange, Walworth County, Wisconsin. The event includes a 100-mile race, a 100km race, and a 38-mile night "fun run."

== Course description ==
The 100-mile race consists of two out and back legs, with the first-round trip distance being 62.9 miles and the second being 37.3 miles. The 100km race follows the first 62.9 miles of the 100-mile race and the 38-mile night "fun run" follows the last 37.3 miles. Runners registered for the 100-mile race may drop at the 100km finish.

The 100-mile course is run entirely on trails (except for a couple hundred feet of road crossings) and traverses the Ice Age Trail for about 65 miles. The trail is about 80% wooded terrain with the rest meandering through gentle prairie or marsh areas. Despite the low elevation, a roller coaster of hills amounts to a total altitude gain of approximately 8,800 feet. There is a 30-hour time cutoff to complete the race, with cutoffs at 3 aid stations along the course. There are 21 staffed aid stations along the course and 8 unstaffed aid stations with water and limited runner aid.

== Course records ==
Distance	Female	Time	Year	Male	Time	Year
100 miles	Donna Perkins	18:12:30	1998	Zach Gingerich	15:17:32	2009
100km	Kami Semick	9:45:13	2005	Michael Borst	8:34:57.9	2015
50km	Emily Ansick	4:43:10.2	2015	Juan Moran	3:58:36	2016
100mile relay	Gyro Trash	16:48:55	2016	Stella & the boys	13:39:57	2023
