= Canadian Death Race =

Annual foot race in Alberta, Canada

- Date: August
- Location: Grande Cache, Alberta, Canada
- Event type: Ultramarathon
- Distance: 118 km
- Established: 2000
- Website: canadiandeathrace.com

The Canadian Death Race is a 118-kilometre (73 mi) foot race through the Canadian rocky mountains in Grande Cache, Alberta. It includes three mountain summits, one major river crossing, and 17,000 feet of elevation change. The race has been held annually on the August long weekend since the year 2000. In 2010 The North Face became the title sponsor and the race was renamed The North Face Canadian Death Race. The North Face's sponsorship was quietly removed from all promotional material on February 20, 2014. It is organized by Sinister Sports. Racers can compete by themselves or in relay teams of up to five people.

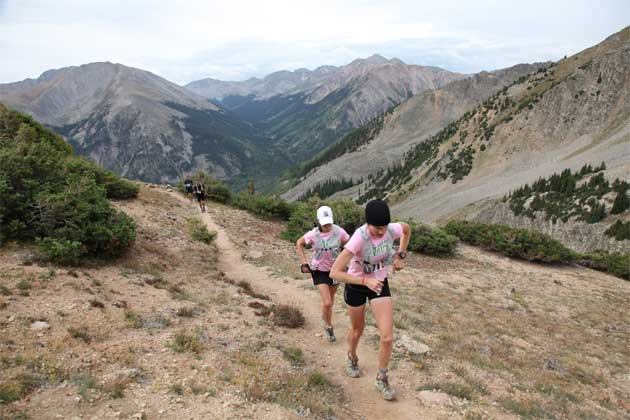
One of the five trails of the Canadian Death Race

== History ==
Grande Cache was a mining town that once thrived from the mining of coal. After the mine was closed, the town suffered. Many homes were in foreclosure and the morale of the people who lived there was low. With the hope of possibly bringing their hometown back to life, Paul Bailey and Dale Tuck began the ultramarathon now known as the Canadian Death Race. In the beginning, Bailey and Tuck did not have the support of the town council. However, that did not hinder the race from being a success in its first year. The first race was launched in August 2000 with 193 participants. By 2010 the race was attracting more than 1000 participants each year from around the world. In 2015, Alissa St Laurent became the first woman to win the race; she finished in 13:53:35.

== See also ==
- Ultramarathon
