= Wasatch Front 100 Mile Endurance Run =

Annual 100 mile utramarathon in Utah

- starting line of the 2009 edition of the race, where Geoff Roes (center, in orange Montrail shirt) would set the current course record of 18:30
- Date: September
- Location: Kaysville, Utah
- Event type: Ultramarathon
- Distance: 100-mile (160 km)
- Established: 1980
- Course records: Men: Geoff Roes, 18:30:55 (2009) Women: Bethany Lewis, 22:21:47 (2014)
- Website: https://wasatch100.com/

The Wasatch Front 100 Mile Endurance Run (Wasatch) is a 100 mile ultramarathon held annually on the first Friday after Labor Day in the Wasatch Front mountain range of Utah. The slogan of the Wasatch Run is "One Hundred Miles of Heaven and Hell", and it is known for its challenging terrain.

== History ==
Wasatch began in 1980 under the leadership of Richard Barnum-Reece as the Wasatch Front 100 and was Utah's first official hundred mile race. The five initial runners were inspired by the Western States, the first of modern-day western 100s. The following year seven runners competed, but no one finished.

The Wasatch 100 is the final race in the Grand Slam of Ultrarunning. The series is organized by the Wasatch Front 100 Mile Endurance Run Race Committee and the Grand Slam of Ultrarunning Awards are presented at the Wasatch 100.

As of 2019, there were more than 300 entrants and the race now operates on a lottery system.

The race finish area in 2007

== Results ==
Men's Winners

Year	Starters	Finishers	Winner	Time	State/Country
2026	396	236	Kevin Stewart	20:41:09	California
2025	322	205	Jose Cruz	20:38:06	Utah
2024	298	164	Jimmy Elam	19:08:35	Utah
2023	309	202	Jose Cruz	20:51:12	Utah
2022	296	155	Shawn Smith	20:30:28	Utah
2021	298	165	Cody Priest	21:24:05	Alaska
2020	Cancelled due to the COVID-19 pandemic				
2019	301	208	Gediminas Grinius	20:55:31	Lithuania
2018	300	187	Jesse Rich	21:07:17	Utah
2017	313	201	Trevor Fuchs	22:59:43	Arizona
2016	334	216	Trevor Fuchs	21:13:58	Utah
2015	313	203	Christopher Schurk	20:41:09	Wyoming
2014	321	240	George Grygar	19:52:12	Utah
2013	312	205	Nicholas Clark	20:24:26	Colorado
2012	289	213	Jeff Browning	19:33:30	Oregon
2011	253	183	Evan Honeyfield	19:31:59	Idaho
2010	244	182	Nicholas Clark	20:21:04	Colorado
2009	245	156	Geoff Roes	18:30:55	Alaska
2008	241	162	Geoff Roes	20:01:07	Alaska
2007	230	161	Kyle Skaggs	19:35:14	New Mexico
2006	223	151	Karl Meltzer	20:18:58	Utah
2005	226	149	Karl Meltzer	19:43:47	Utah
2004	230	131	Karl Meltzer	20:06:08	Utah
2003	217	134	Karl Meltzer	20:46:35	Utah
2002	208	123	Nate McDowell	19:52:25	Oregon
2001	184	109	Leland Barker	21:44:38	Utah
2000	187	125	Karl Meltzer	20:52:56	Utah
1999	190	118	Leland Barker	20:24:00	Utah
1998	199	152	Karl Meltzer	20:08:42	Utah
1997	180	118	Tim Spence	21:13:00	Utah
1996	146	92	Tim Seminoff	22:00:27	Utah
1995	153	111	Mark Tarr	22:57:31	Montana
1994	145	110	Heikki Ingstrom	21:42:13	Utah
1993	122	82	Joe Schlereth	22:14:51	California
1992	129	87	Dana Miller	21:36:54	Utah
1991	105	57	Jim O’Brien	22:55:50	California
1990	108	59	Dana Miller	20:29:28	Utah
1989	97	72	Ricky Spady	21:16:37	Montana
1988	108	55	Dana Miller	21:41:07	Utah
1987	97	56	Dana Miller	21:45:53	Utah
1986	59	37	Chuck Jones	20:39:35	California
1985	67	44	Dana Miller	21:32:26	Utah
1984	51	21	Rob Landis	22:00:48	Utah
1983	41	21	Rob Landis	22:04:48	Utah
1982	19	3	Ben Dewell	30:05:32	California
1981	7	0	None	N/A	N/A
1980	5	2	Greg Rolins	35:01:21	Utah

Women's Winners

Year	Starters	Finishers	Winner	Time	State/Country
2026	396	236	Sarah Ostaszewski	25:18:50	Colorado
2025	322	205	Isabella Poulos	23:45:31	Colorado
2024	298	164	Elizabeth Butler	26:22:10	Utah
2023	309	202	Sara Boughner	27:17:45	Montana
2022	296	155	Sarah Pizzo	24:17:50	Colorado
2021	298	165	Rebecca Rick	26:09:54	Utah
2020	Cancelled due to the COVID-19 pandemic				
2019	301	208	Teresa Kaiser	24:13:32	Utah
2018	300	187	Rebecca Hall	26:46:05	Colorado
2017	313	201	Luzia Buehler	25:08:20	Switzerland
2016	334	216	Darcy Piceu	23:15:25	Arizona
2015	313	203	Heather Culig	25:38:02	Idaho
2014	321	240	Bethany Lewis	22:21:47	Utah
2013	312	205	Sarah Evans McCloskey	24:31:19	Utah
2012	289	213	Emily K. Judd	24:14:35	Montana
2011	253	183	Becky Wheeler	25:53:19	Wyoming
2010	244	182	Darcy Africa	23:20:01	Colorado
2009	245	156	Betsy Nye	23:15:18	California
2008	241	162	Betsy Nye	25:36:56	California
2007	230	161	Liz Irvine	23:29:28	Utah
2006	223	151	Betsy Nye	26:20:02	California
2005	226	149	Darcie P. Africa	24:34:53	Colorado
2004	230	131	Krissy Moehl Sybrowsky	23:49:47	Washington
2003	217	134	Betsy Nye	26:36:53	California
2002	208	123	Betsy Nye	26:34:08	California
2001	184	109	Betsy Nye	26:17:29	California
2000	187	125	Susan Yates Hunter	23:45:39	Utah
1999	190	118	Laura Vaughan	25:17:00	California
1998	199	152	Ann Trason	22:27:10	California
1997	180	118	Martha Swatt	23:42:00	Wyoming
1996	146	92	Deborah Wagner	25:54:33	Utah
1995	153	111	Laura Vaughan	25:41:55	California
1994	145	110	Laura Vaughan	23:55:34	California
1993	122	82	Deborah Wagner	24:34:54	Utah
1992	129	87	Laura Vaughan	25:48:01	California
1991	105	57	Laura Vaughan	27:42:56	California
1990	108	59	Bobbie Dixon	28:09:20	Montana
1989	97	72	Edith Bogenhuber	28:57:45	California
1988	108	55	Debbie Shore	29:46:55	Utah
1987	97	56	Laurie Staton-Carter	28:39:32	Utah
1986	59	37	Becky Nielsen	29:00:15	Utah
1985	67	44	Cindy Andrus	34:26:33	Utah
1984	51	21	Laurie Staton-Carter	32:43:27	Utah
1983	41	21	Laurie Staton-Carter	32:02:05	Utah
1982	19	3	None	N/A	N/A
1981	7	0	None	N/A	N/A
1980	5	2	Laurie Staton-Carter	35:01:21	Utah

== Course records ==
Geoff Roes holds the men's course record with a finish time of 18:30:55 in 2009. Bethany Lewis holds the women's course record with a time of 22:21:47, which she set in 2014.
