= Nikki Kimball =

American ultramarathon runner

Nikki Kimball (born May 23, 1971) is an American distance runner specializing in the Ultramarathon. She ran her first 100-mile race at the Western States 100 Mile Endurance Run in 2004, and was the female winner. She was the winning female at Western States again in 2006 and 2007, becoming only the third woman to win Western States three times. In 2014, she won the Marathon Des Sables multi-stage endurance race on her first attempt. Prior to running, her main sport was cross-country skiing. She was crewed at the 2007 Western States by U.S. Senator Max Baucus of Montana, where Kimball lives. She lives in Bozeman, Montana.

== Early life ==
Kimball grew up in Chittenden, Vermont, and had an active childhood spent outdoors hiking and cross-country skiing. A physician advised that Kimball started cross-country skiing when she was a child, in order to stop her feet turning in. For high school, Nikki went to Holderness School, which is in Holderness New Hampshire and helped her develop her passions for many of the things she does today. Jacobsen, Jaime (Lead Producer and Director) (2017). Finding Traction (Documentary).

== Career highlights ==
=== Ultra marathon ===
- Member of United States 100K Team 2001-2006; 8th overall and 1st American at World Cup 2003, Tainan, Taiwan; 7th at World Cup 2005; scoring member of gold medal 100K team at World Cup 2005
- Western States 100 Champion 2004, 2006, 2007
- 1st place, Ultra Trail du Mont Blanc, 2007
- 50-Mile Trail National Champion 2003, 2004, 2005, Crystal Mountain, Washington
- 50-Mile Road National Champion 2005, State College, Pennsylvania. Broke course record by 23 minutes
- Set course records at numerous 50-milers
- 1st place, American River 50-Mile, 2003 (fastest time by an American woman in 2002-2003
- 2nd Place, National 100K Championships, Pittsburgh, Pennsylvania, 2001
- 1st place, Marathon Des Sables, 2014
- 2nd place, Big Horn 100m, 2016
- 2nd place, HURT 100m, HI, 2017
- 2nd place, Hardrock 100, 2018

=== Mountain running ===
- Member of United States Mountain Running Team 2001-2003; 24th overall, 2nd American, World Mountain Running Trophy 2003, Girdwood, Alaska
- Mt. Washington Road Race 2003, 2nd place, 1st American
- New England Mountain Running Champion 2001, runner-up 2003
- Set numerous course records

=== Trail running ===
- Bridger Ridge Run, 1st place, Bozeman, Montana, 2004 (course record)
- Grand Tree Trail Race Series: undefeated in all races run in 2000-2002
- Set course records in 9 New England Grand Tree races, 2000-2003
- Pennsylvania State Trail Running Champion, 1998
- Run the Rann, 1st place, Dholavira, Gujarat, India, 2014

=== Road running ===
Road marathon wins also include Adirondack Marathon, Schroon, NY; Green Mountain Marathon, Grand Isle, VT; Great Potato Marathon, Boise, ID, Salt Lake City Marathon; Lewis and Clark Marathon, Bozeman, MT

=== Snowshoe racing ===
- U.S. National Champion 2001, 2004, 2005; runner-up 2003
- Member of U.S. National Team 2003-2005

=== Awards, other athletic achievement and running community involvement ===
- Set a new women's record for fastest supported time on Vermont's Long Trail, 273 miles in 5 days 7 hours 42 minutes, August 13–18, 2012. The record breaking attempt was captured in the documentary film "Finding Traction"
- Member of USATF Mountain/Ultra/Trail Council 2002 to 2005; Championship Chair 2005
- Member of the 100K Task Force for USATF
- Member of U.S. Snowshoe Association advisory board 2004-2005
- 1st place team Moab Adventure Xstream, 2005
- North American Female Ultra Runner of Year 2003, 2004, 2007 (Ultrarunning magazine)
- USATF Ultra Runner of the Year 2004
- 15K Biathlon U.S. Olympic Team Trials, 13th place, 1994
- Williams College Ski Team 1989-93; skied to top-20 finishes in Division I NCAA National Championships all four years
- Two-time winner of the Williams College Alumnae Ski Award

== Personal life ==
Kimball has depression, and refers to it as her secret weapon.
