= Umstead 100 =

Ultramarathon race in the United States

Umstead 100, sometimes called the Umstead 100 Ultra is an ultramarathon held annually in April in William B. Umstead State Park in Raleigh, North Carolina. The race features 50 and 100 mile distances over a 12.5 mile loop.
