= Bear 100 Mile Endurance Run =

Ultramarathon held in Utah and Idaho

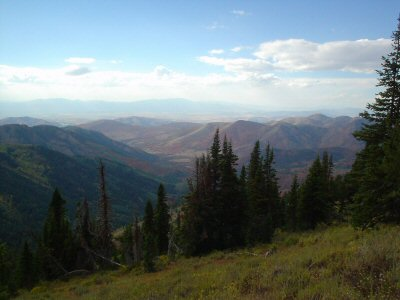
- Photo of the 2005 race
- Date: September
- Location: from Logan, Utah to Fish Haven, Idaho
- Event type: Ultramarathon trail run
- Distance: 100-mile (160 km)
- Established: 1999
- Website: http://www.bear100.com

The Bear 100 Mile Endurance Run is a 100 mile ultramarathon that traverses the Wasatch and Bear River Ranges west of Bear Lake, from Logan, Utah to Fish Haven, Idaho. With 21,986 ft (6,701 m) of climb and an average elevation of 7,700 ft (2,300 m), it is a difficult, mountainous race.

First held in 1999, the run is held on the Friday and Saturday before the last full weekend in September. This normally augurs warm fall days and cool nights in spectacular fall color, hence the run's motto "36 Hours of Indian Summer." In 2006, an unprecedented series of snow storms forced a change to an alternate course 36 hours before the start of the run.

== Rocky Mountain Slam ==
The Bear 100 is part of the "Rocky Mountain Slam," which a runner completes if s/he finishes the Hardrock 100 plus three of four other races in the Rocky Mountains: Leadville Trail 100, the Bear 100 Mile Endurance Run, the Bighorn 100, or the Wasatch Front 100 Mile Endurance Run. The award is presented at and hosted by the Bear 100 Mile Endurance Run, as this is the final run in the series.

== Course records ==
Zachary Garner set the men's course record of 17:11:51 in 2023. Kaci Lickteig set the women's course record of 20:27:57 in 2016.
