= HURT 100 =

Ultramarathon held in Hawaii

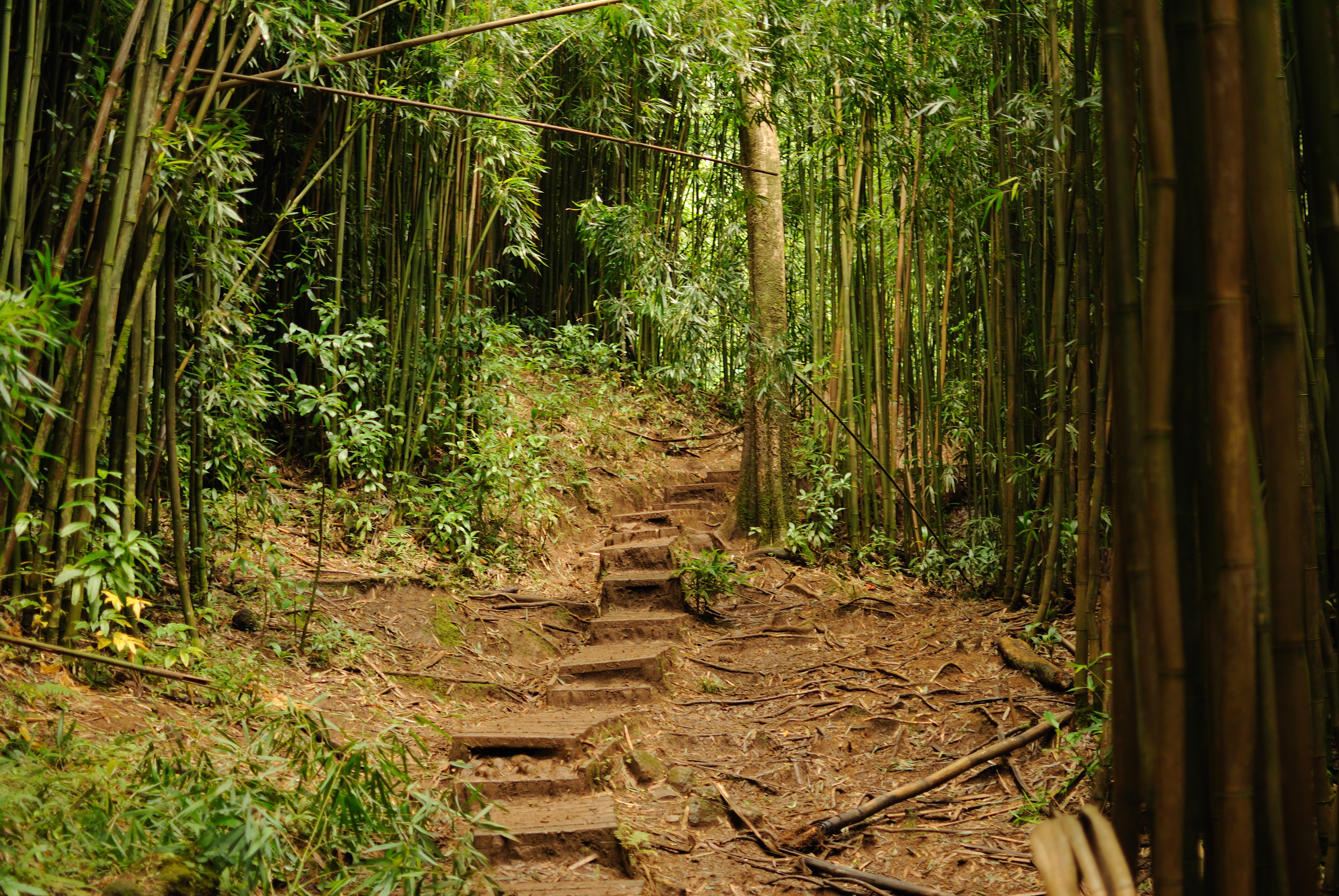
- The Mānoa Falls Trail forms a small part of the course
- Location: Hawaii
- Event type: Trail run
- Distance: 100 miles (160 km)
- Established: 2001
- Website: https://hurt100.com/

HURT 100 is an ultramarathon held in January in Honolulu, Hawaii. "HURT 100" is short for "Hawaiian Ultra Running Team's 100-mile Trail Endurance Run". Held for the first time in 2001, it is the only 100-mile (160 km) trail ultramarathon in Hawaii.

The HURT 100 course consists of five 20-mile trail loops that start in Makiki and connect to Mānoa and Nu‘uanu valleys on the island of Oʻahu. There are three aid stations and the overall time cutoff for the race is 36 hours. HURT 100 is widely regarded as one of the most difficult ultramarathons in the world thanks to nearly 25,000 feet (7,600 m) of elevation gain and extremely technical rainforest trails that feature copious roots, rocks, and stream crossings. Years with favorable conditions can see a finish rate of up to 60%, but years with rain and poorer conditions can see finish rates of only 29%.

Since only 135 runners are admitted to the race, it uses a lottery system to gain entry. The current overall course record is 19:22 by Tyler Juza, beating the previous course record (on a slightly amended course) by Gary Robbins of 19:35. The women's course record, held by Alyssa Clark, is 23:26.
