= Western States Endurance Run =

Annual ultramarathon in California

- Western States Endurance Run logo patch
- Date: Last weekend of June
- Location: Olympic Valley, California; Auburn, California
- Event type: Ultramarathon trail run
- Distance: 100.2 miles (161 km)
- Established: 1977
- Course records: Men: 13:46:15 (2026); Vincent Bouillard; Women: 15:28:05 (2026); Jennifer Lichter
- Website: www.wser.org

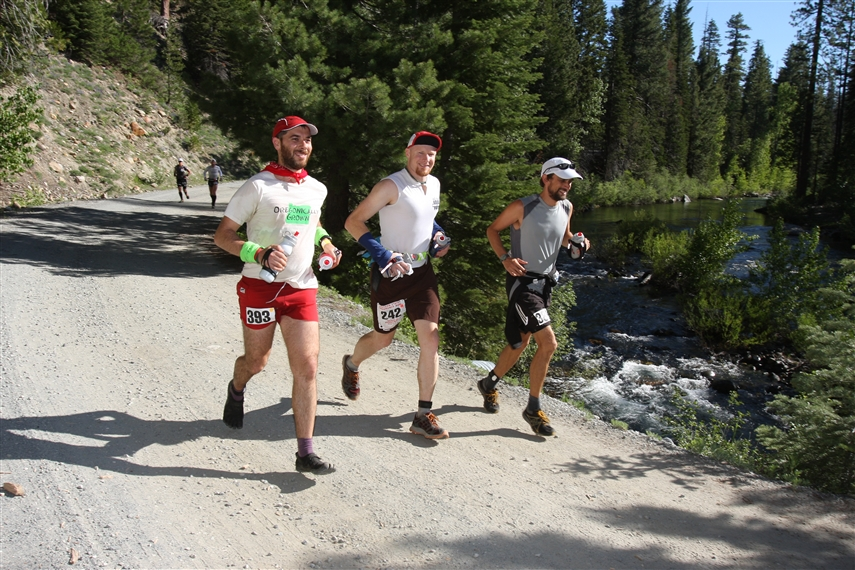
Runners, WS 2010

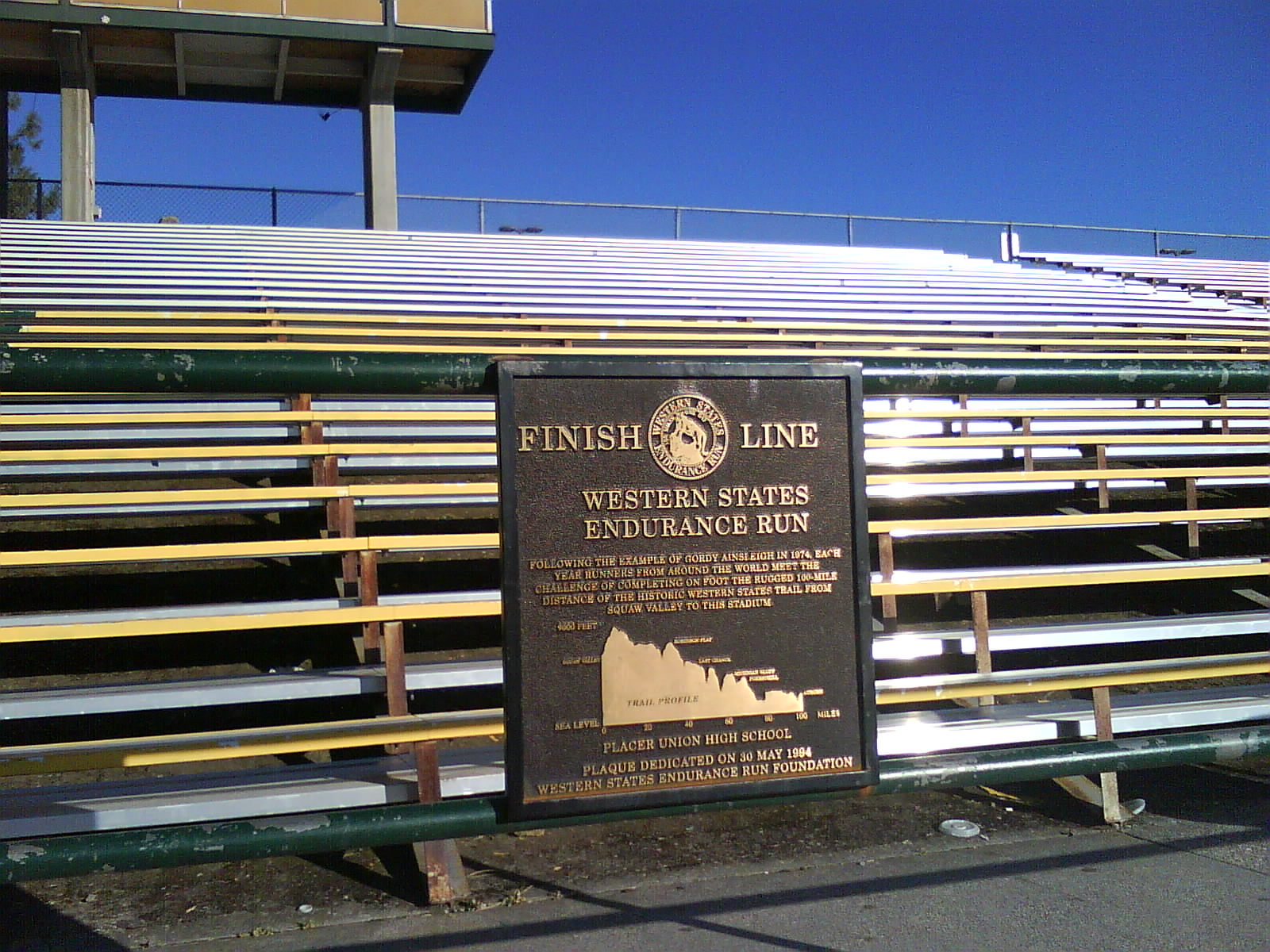
The finish line to the Western States 100 at Placer High School

The Western States Endurance Run, known commonly as the Western States 100 or Western States, is a 100.2-mile (161 km) ultramarathon that takes place on California's Sierra Nevada Mountains trails each year on the last full weekend of June. Western States is one of the most competitive ultramarathons in the United States, and is administered by the nonprofit Western States Endurance Run Foundation.

The Western States 100 is one of the five 100-mile races that comprise the Grand Slam of Ultrarunning, which also includes the Old Dominion 100 in Virginia, the Vermont 100 Mile Endurance Run, the Wasatch Front 100 Mile Endurance Run in Utah, and the Leadville Trail 100 in Colorado. One of the more prestigious ultramarathons in the world, it is a qualifier for the UTMB World Series, although the UTMB organization has a major competing race in the same area with a similar course, called "Canyons Endurance Runs by UTMB".

== History ==
The course was first attempted on foot by twenty soldiers from Fort Riley, Kansas during the 1972 Tevis Cup horse ride event. Because the Tevis Cup imposed a 24-hour time limit, the soldiers started one day before the horses. Seven completed the 100.2 miles, and it was subsequently reported as the first "Auburn Endurance March". In 1974, Gordy Ainsleigh became the first to complete the course in under 24 hours, arriving in Auburn in twenty-three hours and forty-two minutes. In 1976, Ken “Cowman” Shirk became the second to complete the distance, though 30 minutes over the 24-hour mark.

Sixteen runners signed up for the first official Western States Endurance Run in 1977, held in conjunction with the Tevis Cup. Runners were provided with water but were otherwise required to bring their own supplies. Thirteen of the 16 dropped out or were pulled by the 50-mile mark. Of the three remaining runners, only Andy Gonzales finished in the 24-hour time limit set for the horses. The other two, Peter Mattei and Ralph Paffenbarger, finished in 28 hours and 36 minutes (unofficially). Their finishing times led to the establishment of the first sub-30-hour awards. Later that year, the Western States Trail Foundation established the race's first board of directors.

The following year, 1978, the Western States Endurance Run was made independent of the Tevis Cup and took place in June, a month earlier than the horse ride. There were 21 aid stations and six medical checks. 63 runners competed, 30 runners finished, and Pat Smythe became the first woman finisher, finishing with a time of 29 hours and 34 minutes.

By 1980, the number of starting runners had increased to 250, from three countries and 21 states. A lottery system for race entry was implemented in 1981.

In 1984, the Granite Chief Wilderness was created under the provisions of the 1964 Wilderness Act, and about four miles (6 km) of the Western States trail was within the new boundaries. The wilderness designation prevented the Forest Service from permitting organized events in the area. In 1988, however, the Endurance Run (and the original Trail Ride) was given Congressional permission to continue, but with the number of runners limited to 369, the size of the 1984 field.

In 1985, the course was measured and found to be slightly shorter than 100 miles. The course was altered slightly and given an official distance of 100.2 miles from 1985 onwards. For this reason, performances from before 1985 are not included in the official list of records. Both the 1985 and 1986 editions were covered by ABC's Wide World of Sports. NBC's Sports World emulated that, covering the 1989 edition.

In 2017, a wait list was implemented, with replacement runners selected from the list to ensure that the 369 allowable starting spots were completely filled.

=== Race cancellations ===
In 2008, the race was canceled due to bad air quality and smoke from an unprecedented number of wildfires.

In 2020, the race was canceled due to the COVID-19 pandemic.

== Course ==
The Western States Endurance Run has followed the same course since 1986, traversing a section of the Western States Trail, a designated National Recreational Trail that stretches from Salt Lake City, Utah, to Sacramento, California. Much of the course is accessible only by foot, horse, or helicopter.

The race starts at the base of the Palisades Tahoe ski resort in the west end of the Olympic Valley in California and traverses the Foresthill Divide and through Foresthill. The course then crosses the American River Canyon, ascends through Cool, and finishes at the Placer High School track in Auburn, California.

The terrain is quite rugged, often featuring snow on the passes. Temperatures during the run can range from 20 °F (−7 °C) to more than 110 °F (43 °C).

=== Elevation profile ===
Runners ascend a cumulative total of 18,090 feet (5,510 m) and descend a total of 22,970 feet (7,000 m) on mountain trails before reaching the finish.

Starting at 6,200 feet (1,900 m) on the Olympic Valley floor, runners immediately ascend to Emigrant Pass at 8,750 feet (2,670 m), gaining 2,550 feet (780 m) in elevation over the first 4.5 miles (7.2 km). The trail then descends to around 7,000 feet (2,100 m) at the 10-mile mark. Approximately 20 miles (32 km) in, runners continue down into Duncan Canyon before making a 1,500 foot (460 m) ascent back up towards Robinson Flat.

Between 30 miles (48 km) and 45 miles (72 km), the trail drops to elevation 3,000 feet (910 m), at which point runners make the ascent to "Devil's Thumb". From this landmark, runners descend 2,000 feet (610 m) to cross El Dorado Creek, up 1,500 feet (460 m) to Michigan Bluff, and then down into the town of Foresthill.

At this point, runners pass through the "Cal 1", "Cal 2", and "Cal 3" descents to arrive at the Rucky Chucky river crossing. Once across the American River, just over 20 miles (32 km) remain. The next climb is through the town of Cool, gaining around 750 feet (230 m) before sloping downward again.

=== Trail features ===
At 78 miles (126 km), runners must ford the American River near the Rucky Chucky crossing. To cross, runners wade with the assistance of a guide rope stretched from bank to bank. However, in high water years, runners are conveyed across the canyon in river rafts.

=== Duration ===
Because of the length, the race commences at 5 a.m. and continues through the day and into the night.

=== Aid stations ===
There are 20 aid stations, including 10 major medical checkpoints.

== Awards and timed milestones ==
All entrants who complete the race in less than 30 hours and within race regulations are recognized as official finishers and receive a finisher's medallion.

=== First place finishers ===
The top male finisher and the top female finisher are each awarded with the Western States Cougar Trophy. Provided they finish in under 24 hours, they are also declared the winners of the Wendell Robie Cup, a "perpetual" trophy with the names of all winners engraved.

=== Belt buckles ===
Runners who complete the Western States Endurance Run in less than 24 hours are awarded a hand-made silver belt buckle. Runners who complete the Western States Endurance Run in a time between 24 hours and 30 hours are awarded a hand-made bronze belt buckle.

Milestone belt buckles are also awarded to individuals with 10, 20, and 25 finishes in under 24 hours (the "10 Day", "20 Day", and "25 Day" belt buckles). 1000 Mile and 2500 Mile belt buckles are awarded to those with 10 and 25 official finishes.

=== Age group awards ===
Age group awards are given to the top three men and women in the categories: 39 and under; 40–49; 50–59; 60–69; and 70 and over.

=== Other awards ===
The oldest male and female finishers receive awards.

== Notable finishers ==
Jim King became the first runner to win on debut in 1982, and came second the following year. In 1984 he won again, with a time of 14:54, which was the fastest finish until 2014, albeit set on the slightly shorter pre-1985 course. He won again in 1985 and became the first male three-time winner of the event. His time of 16:02 became the first official course record on the measured 100.2 mile course, and stood until 1991.

Tim Twietmeyer, from California, holds the record for race completions, having completed the race a record 25 times, all in under 24 hours. He has won the race five times and completed his 25th finish in 2006. His son, Austin Twietmeyer, has also completed the race, finishing in just under 30 hours in 2021.

Scott Jurek, from Minnesota, holds the record for men's consecutive victories. His 2005 victory was his seventh consecutive win.

Ann Trason holds the record for most victories, having won the race fourteen times. Her women's course record of 17:37:51, set in 1994, stood for eighteen years before being surpassed in 2012 by Ellie Greenwood, who recorded a time of 16:47:19.

In 2023, Courtney Dauwalter lowered the women's mark to 15:29:33, a record that stood until 2026, when Jennifer Lichter established the current open female course record of 15:28:06.

The open male course record is held by France's Vincent Bouillard, who clocked a time of 13:46:15 in 2026, eclipsing the previous record of 14:09:28 set by Jim Walmsley in 2019.

In 2010, Amy Palmiero-Winters, a transtibial amputee, became the first amputee to complete the race, finishing in 27:43:10.

In 2016, Andrew Miller, 20, became the youngest winner ever after Jim Walmsley, the forecasted winner, took a wrong turn approaching the north fork of the American River near mile 95.

=== Men's winners ===
Year	Winner	Time	Age	Country
1974	Gordy Ainsleigh	23:42:20	26	United States
1976	Ken Shirk	24:30:00	23	United States
1977	Andy Gonzalez	22:57:00	22	United States
1978	Andy Gonzalez	18:50:00	23	United States
1979	Mike Catlin	16:11:56	27	United States
1980	Mike Catlin	18:35:42	28	United States
1981	Jim Howard/Doug Latimer (tie)	16:02:37	27/43	United States
1982	Jim King	16:17:00	25	United States
1983	Jim Howard	16:07:00	29	United States
1984	Jim King	14:54:00	27	United States
1985	Jim King	16:02:44	28	United States
1986	Chuck Jones	16:37:47	27	United States
1987	Herb Tanzer	17:41:06	35	United States
1988	Brian Purcell	16:24:00	32	United States
1989	Mark Brotherton	16:53:39	32	United States
1990	Tom Johnson	16:38:52	31	United States
1991	Tom Johnson	15:54:05	32	United States
1992	Tim Twietmeyer	16:54:16	33	United States
1993	Tom Johnson	17:08:34	34	United States
1994	Tim Twietmeyer	16:51:01	35	United States
1995	Tim Twietmeyer	18:34:58	36	United States
1996	Tim Twietmeyer	17:42:06	37	United States
1997	Mike Morton	15:40:41	25	United States
1998	Tim Twietmeyer	17:51:20	39	United States
1999	Scott Jurek	17:34:22	25	United States
2000	Scott Jurek	17:17:24	26	United States
2001	Scott Jurek	16:38:30	27	United States
2002	Scott Jurek	16:19:10	28	United States
2003	Scott Jurek	16:01:18	29	United States
2004	Scott Jurek	15:36:27	30	United States
2005	Scott Jurek	16:40:45	31	United States
2006	Graham Cooper	18:17:28	36	United States
2007	Hal Koerner	16:12:16	31	United States
2008	Cancelled due to poor air quality caused by 2008 California wildfires			
2009	Hal Koerner	16:24:55	33	United States
2010	Geoff Roes	15:07:04	34	United States
2011	Kilian Jornet	15:34:24	23	Spain
2012	Timothy Olson	14:46:44	28	United States
2013	Timothy Olson	15:17:27	29	United States
2014	Rob Krar	14:53:22	37	Canada
2015	Rob Krar	14:48:59	38	Canada
2016	Andrew Miller	15:39:36	20	United States
2017	Ryan Sandes	16:19:38	35	South Africa
2018	Jim Walmsley	14:30:04	28	United States
2019	Jim Walmsley	14:09:28	29	United States
2020	Cancelled due to the COVID-19 pandemic			
2021	Jim Walmsley	14:46:01	31	United States
2022	Adam Peterman	15:13:48	26	United States
2023	Tom Evans	14:40:22	31	United Kingdom
2024	Jim Walmsley	14:13:45	34	United States
2025	Caleb Olson	14:11:25	29	United States
2026	Vincent Bouillard	13:46:15	32	France

=== Women's winners ===
Year	Winner	Time	Age	Country
1978	Pat Smythe	29:34:00	35	United States
1979	Skip Swannack	21:56:27	37	United States
1980	Sally Edwards	22:13:44	32	United States
1981	Bjorg Austrheim-Smith	18:46:00	38	United States
1982	Bjorg Austrheim-Smith	18:23:00	39	United States
1983	Bjorg Austrheim-Smith	19:11:00	40	United States
1984	Judy Milkie-West	20:04:00	34	United States
1985	Terri Gerber	20:30:03	36	United States
1986	Kathy D'Onofrio-Wood	20:58:16	21	United States
1987	Mary Hammes	21:23:37	27	United States
1988	Kathy D'Onofrio-Wood	18:52:40	23	United States
1989	Ann Trason	18:47:46	28	United States
1990	Ann Trason	18:33:02	29	United States
1991	Ann Trason	18:29:37	30	United States
1992	Ann Trason	18:14:48	31	United States
1993	Ann Trason	19:05:22	32	United States
1994	Ann Trason	17:37:51	33	United States
1995	Ann Trason	18:40:01	34	United States
1996	Ann Trason	18:57:36	35	United States
1997	Ann Trason	19:19:49	36	United States
1998	Ann Trason	18:46:16	37	United States
1999	Suzanne Brana	21:23:39	41	United States
2000	Ann Trason	19:44:42	39	United States
2001	Ann Trason	18:33:34	40	United States
2002	Ann Trason	18:16:26	41	United States
2003	Ann Trason	18:36:03	42	United States
2004	Nikki Kimball	18:43:25	33	United States
2005	Annette Bednosky	18:39:01	38	United States
2006	Nikki Kimball	19:26:51	35	United States
2007	Nikki Kimball	18:12:38	36	United States
2008	Cancelled due to poor air quality caused by 2008 California wildfires			
2009	Anita Ortiz	18:24:17	45	United States
2010	Tracy Garneau	19:01:55	41	Canada
2011	Ellie Greenwood	17:55:29	32	United Kingdom
2012	Ellie Greenwood	16:47:19	33	United Kingdom
2013	Pam Smith	18:37:21	38	United States
2014	Stephanie Howe	18:01:42	30	United States
2015	Magdalena Boulet	19:05:21	41	United States
2016	Kaci Lickteig	17:57:59	29	United States
2017	Cat Bradley	19:31:31	25	United States
2018	Courtney Dauwalter	17:27:00	33	United States
2019	Clare Gallagher	17:23:24	27	United States
2020	Cancelled due to the COVID-19 pandemic			
2021	Beth Pascall	17:10:42	33	United Kingdom
2022	Ruth Croft	17:21:30	33	New Zealand
2023	Courtney Dauwalter	15:29:34	38	United States
2024	Katie Schide	15:46:57	32	United States
2025	Abby Hall	16:37:16	34	United States
2026	Jennifer Lichter	15:28:05	30	United States
