= 4 Deserts =

Annual series of desert ultramarthons

4 Deserts Ultramarathon Series and RacingThePlanet Series
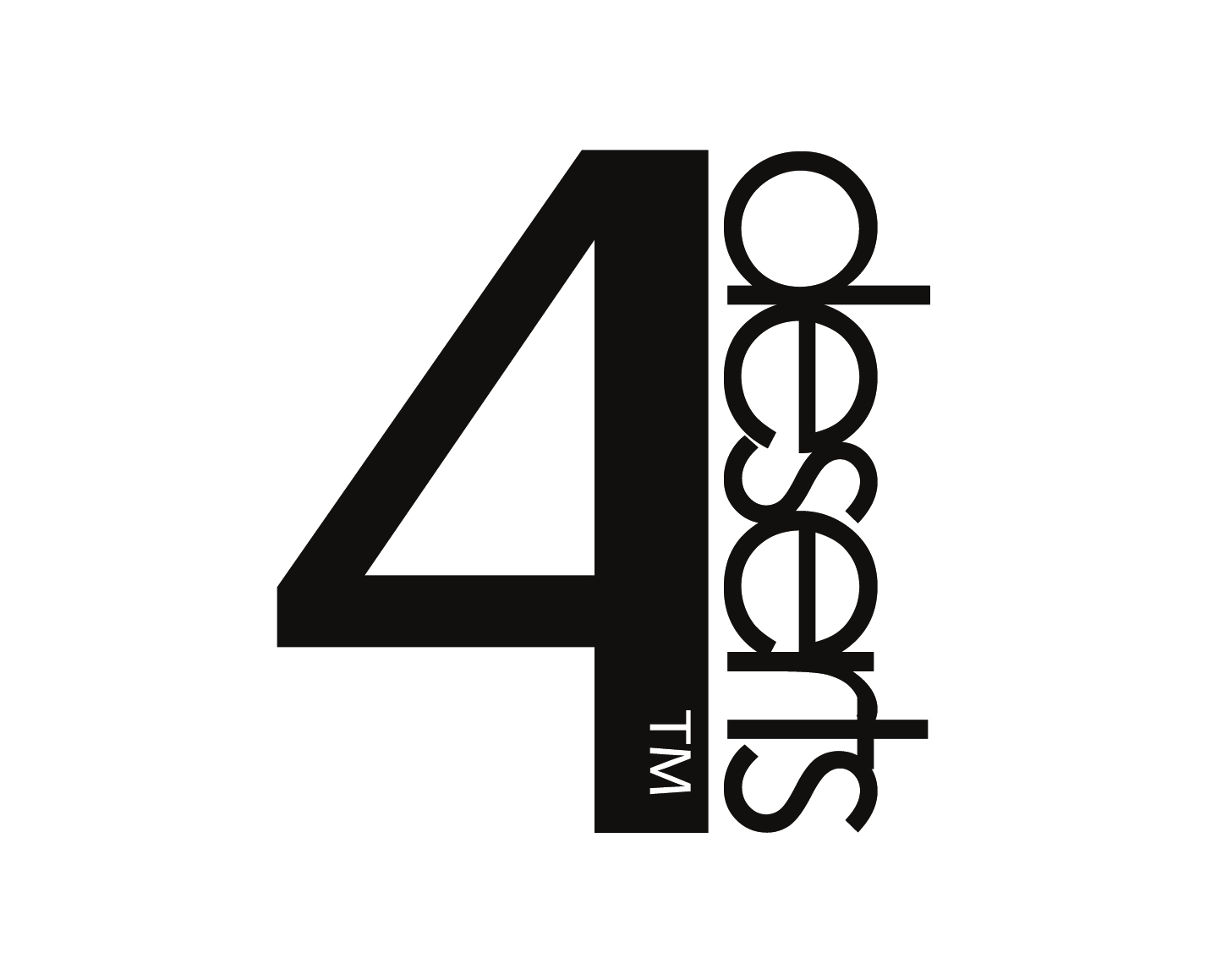
- The company logo of 4 Deserts Ultramarathon Series and RacingThePlanet Ultramarathon.
- Genre: Ultramarathon stage race
- Begins: March
- Ends: December
- Frequency: Annual
- Locations: Chile, Mongolia, Namibia, Antarctica
- Years active: 24
- Attendance: Max 200 competitors
- Website: racingtheplanet.com

The 4 Deserts Ultramarathon Series is an annual series of four 250-kilometer (155-mile) races across deserts around the globe. The races were recognized as the world's leading endurance footrace series by TIME magazine in 2009 and 2010, as the "Ultimate test of human endurance". The series was founded by American Mary K Gadams who founded RacingThePlanet in 2002.

The Gobi March, the series' inaugural race, was held in the Gobi Desert of western China in 2003. Over the following three years, an additional race was introduced in a new location each year. In 2004, the Atacama Crossing was held in the Atacama Desert of Chile. This was followed by the Sahara Race in the Sahara Desert of Egypt (Eastern Desert) in 2005. In 2006 a fourth race, called The Last Desert, took place in Antarctica and was the first year in which all 4 Deserts races were held in the same calendar year.

Competitors can enter any of the individual multiday races within the 4 Deserts Race Series, but if they wish to take part in The Last Desert (Antarctica) they must successfully finish at least two of the other races in the series.

More than seventy races have been staged with more than 10,000 individuals representing 100+ countries. Many participants return to compete in additional events, and there is a growing list of members in the 4 Deserts Club and 4 Deserts Grand Slam Club.

In 2013, a documentary film about 4 Deserts was released. Desert Runners, directed by Jennifer Steinman, follows four participants as they attempt to complete the series in 2010. The Desert Runners documentary received many film awards.

== 4 Deserts Ultramarathon Series ==
The events that combine to make the 4 Deserts Ultramarathon Series are:

=== Atacama Crossing (Chile) ===
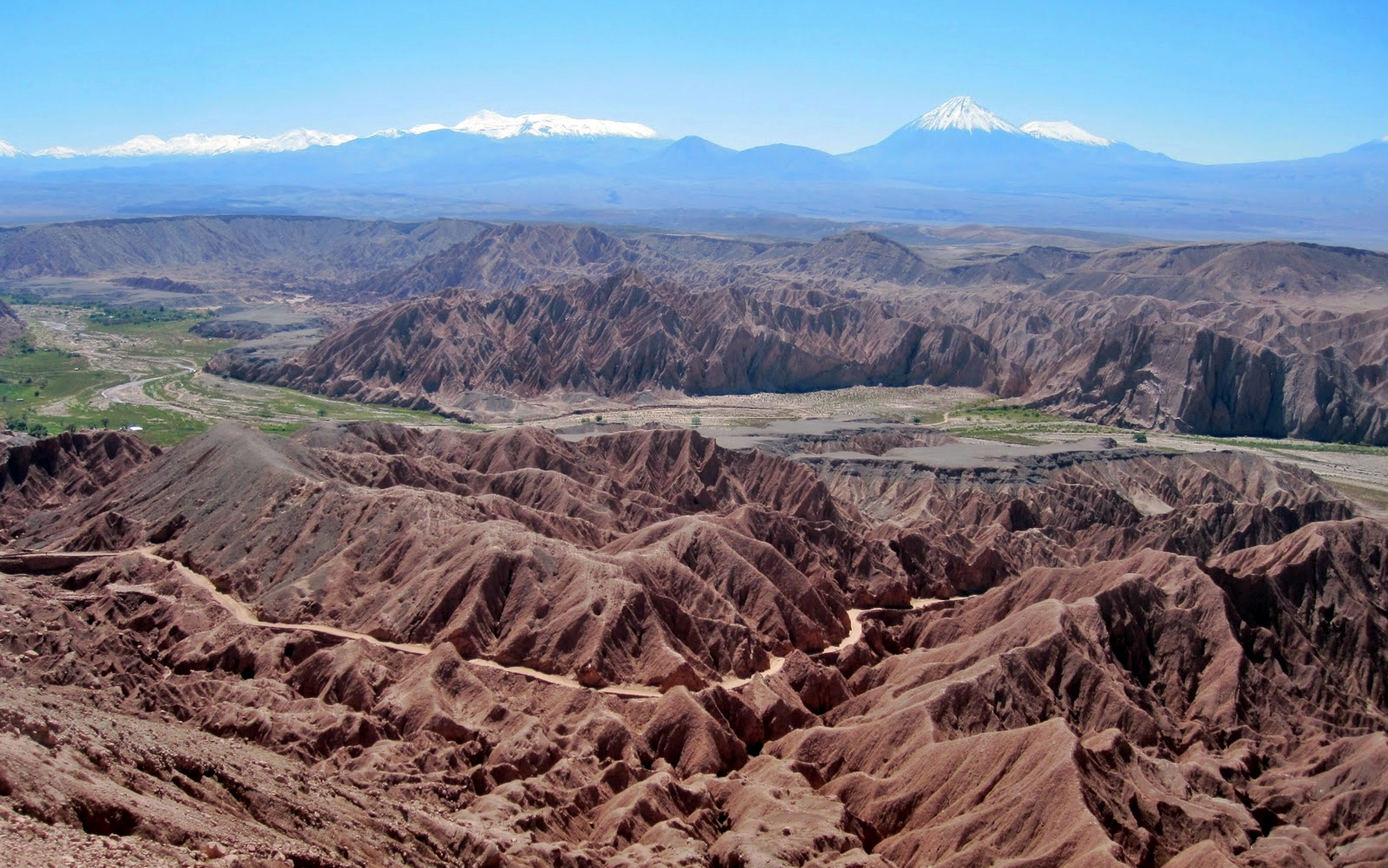
View from the Atacama Crossing 2011.

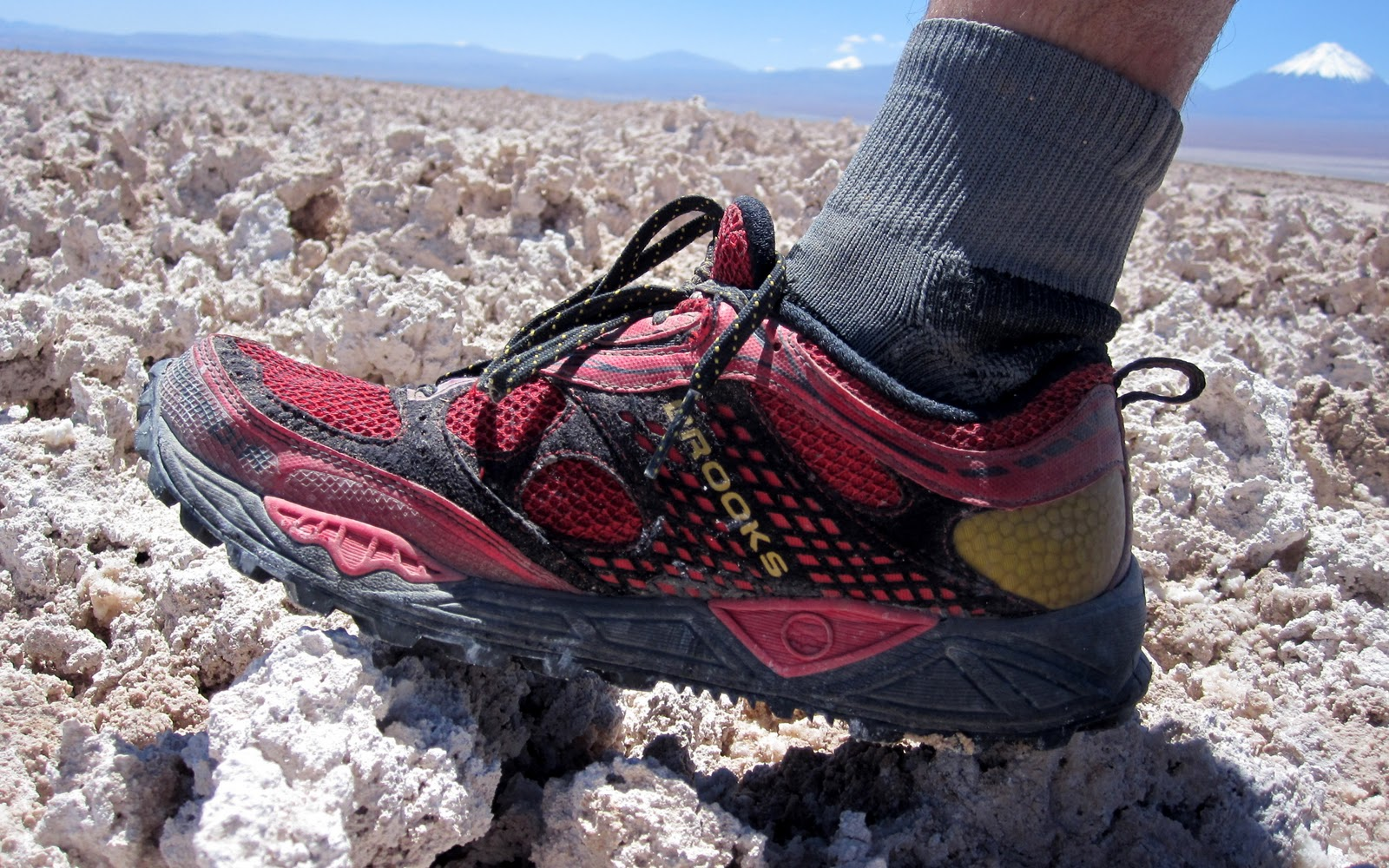
The uneven Atacama salt flats.

The Atacama Crossing crosses Chile's Atacama Desert, the driest place on Earth. The Atacama Desert has a unique landscape of salt lakes, volcanoes, lava flows and sand dunes. Moreover, owing to its otherworldly appearance, the landscape has been compared to that of Mars and has been used as a location for filming Mars scenes, most notably in the television series Space Odyssey: Voyage to the Planets.

The Atacama Crossing is grueling because of its terrain, harsh climate and altitude that averages 2,500 meters (8,000 feet) during the race. The race typically begins at its highest point of more than 3,000 meters in Rainbow Valley.

San Pedro de Atacama is the host town of the Atacama Crossing.

=== Gobi March (Mongolia) ===
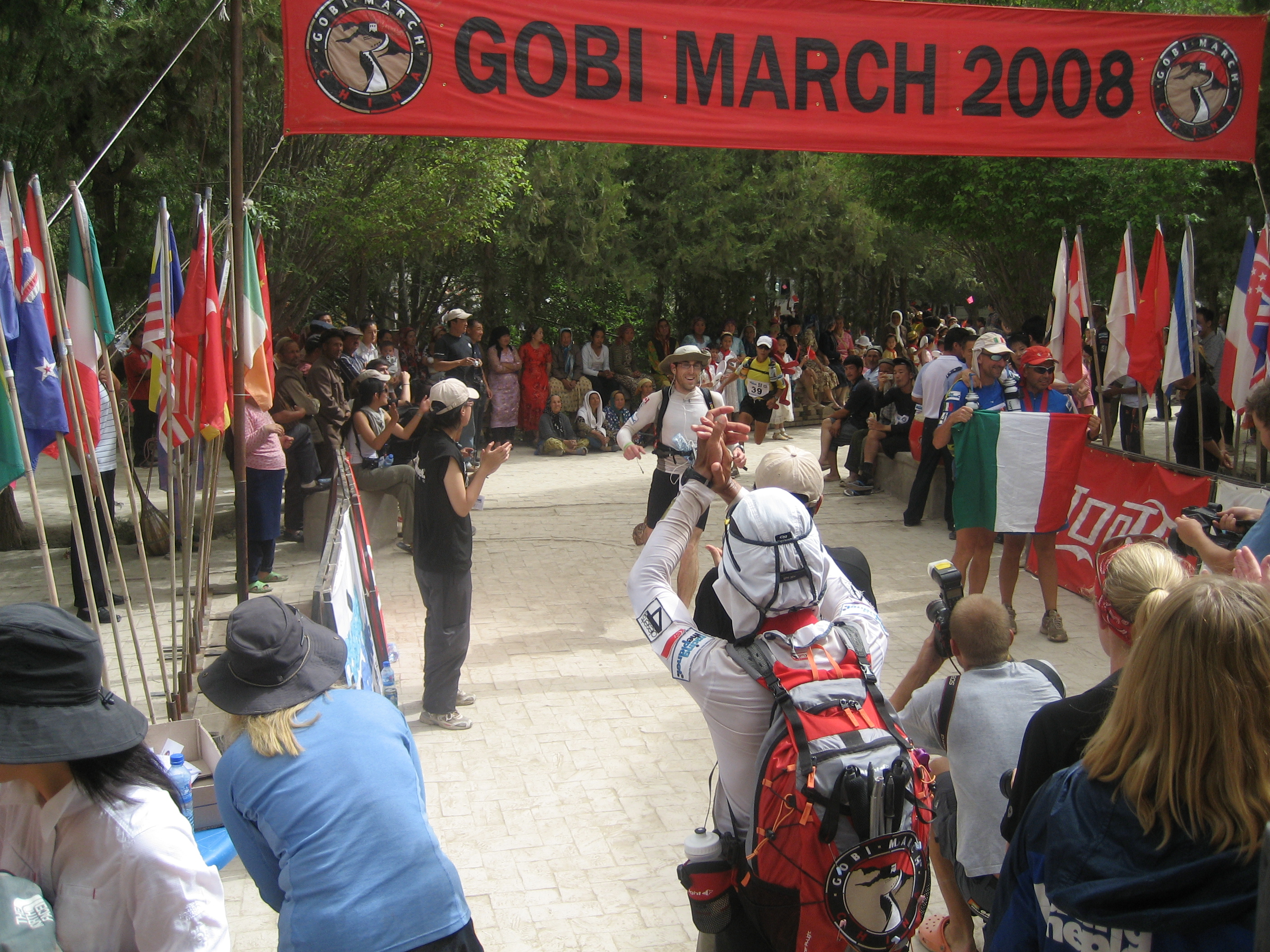
The finish line of the 2008 Gobi March.

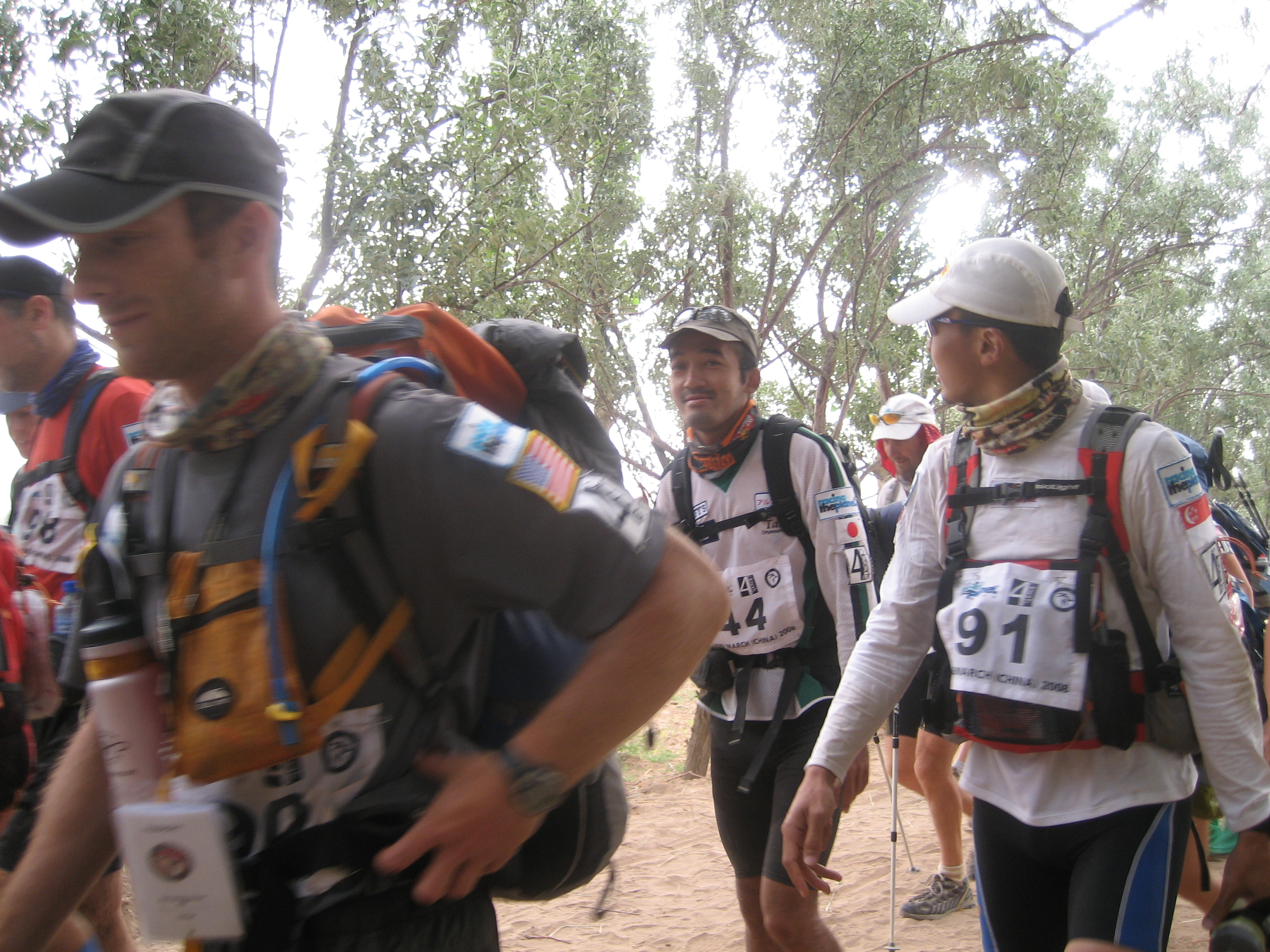
The 2008 Gobi March.

Originally located in the Gobi Desert of China, since 2018 the race now takes place in various locations around the Mongolian area of the Gobi Desert, and is usually held in late August.

The Gobi March's challenges include the changes in temperature from the hot highlands to the oppressive cold in sand dunes, the open sun, potential sandstorms and variety of terrain – soft sand-dunes, rocky tracks, steep hills, ridges and riverbeds.

A Shanghai-based competitor died of heatstroke after competing in the 2010 Gobi March. His brother (who was not at the race) claimed Racing the Planet was "reckless" to set such a course for non-professional athletes, and ill-prepared.

=== Namib Race (Namibia) ===
Originally hosted in the Sahara Desert of Egypt, the race is now located along the Skeleton Coast of Namibia. The Namib segment takes place, usually in late April, in the oldest desert in the world. Competitors have to contend with a variety of terrains, both rock and sand, but will face endless miles of sand dunes up to 122 meters (400 feet) high. Daytime temperatures reach 50 °C (122 °F).

In 2012 the race took place for the third time in the Western Desert around the region around Al Fayuum, Wadi El-Rayan Protected Area and The Valley of the Whales or Wadi Al-Hitan, a UNESCO World Heritage Site.

Due to political unrest the 2014 edition of the race was moved to Jordan where it crossed four deserts; Wadi Rum, Kharaza, Humaima and Wadi Araba before finishing in the ancient city of Petra. The 2016 event was relocated to the Namib Desert where it is expected to remain for some time.

=== The Last Desert (Antarctica) ===
The race uses a polar expedition ship as its base, traveling to the different course locations on the Antarctic Peninsula and offshore islands based on the prevailing sea and weather conditions, with competitors transferred from ship to shore by zodiacs. Since 2010, this segment has been held biannually in order to minimize its environmental impact, and usually takes place around the end of November.

The unique challenges of The Last Desert (Antarctica) include having to cope with the severity of the weather conditions that can include gale force blizzards and temperatures down to −20 °C (−4 °F). Competitors also have to deal with the unpredictability of daily stage lengths and start-times, as the prevailing environmental conditions dictate where and when stages might begin.

Fifteen individuals from around the world completed the inaugural event in 2006 becoming the first in the world to complete a 250 km footrace on the Antarctic continent. The Last Desert 2010 took place in November of that year in King George Island, Deception Island, and Dorian Bay. The Last Desert 2010 was featured 3 times on IMG's Transworld Sport.

== RacingThePlanet Series ==
The RacingThePlanet Ultramarathon was introduced in 2008 as the 4 Deserts saw a desire for multi-day, multi-stage races in new countries. The concept was to supplement with 4 Deserts Race Series with one-off races in new locations each year. These locations did not have to be deserts, but it was preferred that they would retain some of the most desirable elements of the races in the original series including locations that were off the beaten track and where beautiful, cultural and physically challenging courses could be set. So far, the RacingThePlanet Ultramarathon has been held in Vietnam (2008), Namibia (2009), Australia (2010), Nepal (2011), Jordan (2012), Iceland (2013), Madagascar (2014), Ecuador (2015), Sri Lanka (2016), Patagonia (2017), Zealand (2019), Georgia (2021) and Lapland (2022). In 2023, RacingThePlanet will celebrate 20 years with a special race in Jordan called "RacingThePlanet: The 20-Year Race. This special race will finish in front of the Treasury Building in Petra.

== Event format ==
The 250-kilometer (155-mile) races take place over seven days and six stages. A campsite is raised each night for competitors where they are provided with a place in a tent to sleep, access to hot water, a campfire, medical assistance and the CyberTent where they can view and send messages to family and friends and update their race blog.

Competitors race from campsite to campsite each day following marker flags that have been planted the preceding day. They must pass through a series of checkpoints where they collect drinking water and can seek medical treatment.

Other than the access to the services described competitors must race completely self-supported, carrying all their food, supplies and equipment for the week. Each competitor must carry a selection of mandatory items at all times to help ensure their safety out on course.

Competitors must start each stage at the appointed time and on certain stages cut-off times are set which racers must meet in order to remain active in the event.

The results of the race are based on the cumulative time taken for the competitor to complete all the stages, and a competitor must successfully pass through every checkpoint in order to collect a finisher's medal.

Should a competitor withdraw from a particular stage, they may not continue in the race.

== Charitable causes ==
About 50% of competitors choose to support causes when racing at the 4 Deserts.

Because of the remote locations of many of the races RacingThePlanet choose to support a specific charity at almost every event, that provides support to the local community in which the event takes place. The company has a long running partnership with Operation Smile, and has raised over US$500,000 for the charity for projects in Vietnam, China and Egypt, often funding missions and surgeries in the local communities through which competitors race.

The company has donated books and sports equipment to schools in Xinjiang province where the Gobi March is held through the Esquel Y. L. Yang Education Fund who they have also supported for a number of years.

In 2008, the Gobi March took place just one month after the devastating earthquake in Sichuan Province on 12 May, so that year RacingThePlanet put together a special auction whereby friends and families of competitors could bid to buy a hot shower for three competitors at the end of the 90 km Stage 5 of the event. An unheard of and never-to-be-repeated luxury. The auction raised almost US$30,000 for the Red Cross disaster fund.

Again in 2010 another earthquake affected a country that plays host to a 4 Deserts race. The Chilean earthquake of 27 February occurred just one week before the start of the Atacama Crossing. RacingThePlanet and the community of competitors and friends raised US$15,000 for Habitat for Humanity in the weeks to follow.

== 4 Deserts Champions ==
4 Deserts Champions are crowned in the male and female categories at the end of every edition of The Last Desert (Antarctica). Since 2010, champions have been recognized in an official Awards Ceremony at the conclusion of the Antarctic race; champions from previous years have been crowned retrospectively.

4 Deserts Champions are determined by adding the finishing rankings of every The Last Desert competitor over each of the four races in the series. For this reason, only 4 Deserts Club members are eligible for the award. The lowest aggregate score in the male and female categories is named a 4 Deserts Champion.

In 2010, Ryan Sandes of South Africa recorded the lowest and unbeatable aggregate score of 4 points as he had won each of the 4 Deserts races he had entered. In 2012, Spanish racer Vicente Juan Garcia Beneito and German competitor Anne-Marie Flammersfeld repeated this feat by winning all four races in the same calendar year and qualifying for the 4 Deserts Grand Slam.

4 Deserts Champions:

2018

Male : (Hong Kong) Wong Ho-chung

2014

Male: (Spain) José Manuel Martínez Fernandez

Female: (Mexico) Isis Breiter

2012

Male: (Spain) Vicente Juan Garcia Beneito

Female: (Germany) Anne-Marie Flammersfeld

2010

Male: (South Africa) Ryan Sandes

Female: (Croatia) Mirjana Pellizzer

2008

Male: (United States) Dean Karnazes

Female: (Italy) Laura Corti

2007

Male: (Italy) Francesco Galanzino

Female: none

2006

Male: (Taiwan) Kevin Lin

Female: (United States) Lisanne Dorian

== 4 Deserts Grand Slam ==
The 4 Deserts Grand Slam has been so named by competitors attempting to complete all the events in the 4 Deserts Race Series in one calendar year.

The first Grand Slam was first attempted in 2008 when five competitors set out to complete the task and two were ultimately successful. The first two competitors to be named Grand Slammers were famed endurance athlete Dean Karnazes of the United States and Paul Liebenberg of South Africa. In 2010, fourteen competitors attempted to complete the feat and nine, including the first three women, were successful. The Grand Slam has become increasingly popular in the years in which all 4 Deserts take place.

4 Deserts Grand Slammers:

2014

Juan Carlos Albarran (Spain), Asger Bech-Thomsen (Denmark), Paul Borlinha (Canada), Isis Breiter (Mexico), Chris Calimano (United States), Arthur Chu (Philippines), Brett Foote (Australia), Michael Gilgen (Switzerland), Jose Luis Gomez Alciturri (Spain), Andrzej Gondek (Poland), Kyungpyo Hong (South Korea), Linh Huynh (Canada), Daniel Lewczuk (Poland), Andres Lledo Lopez (Spain), Jose Manuel Martinez Fernandez (Spain), Atul Patki (India), Inia Raumati (New Zealand), Rob Trepa (United States), Marek Wikiera (Poland)

2012

Jess Baker (Australia), Cécile Bertin (France), Gyouyoung Choi (South Korea), Christian Colque (Argentina), Alper Dalkilic (Turkey), Greg Donovan (Australia), Matthew Donovan (Australia), Jeison Duarte da Costa (Brazil), Anne-Marie Flammersfeld (Germany), Vicente Juan Garcia Beneito (Spain), James Gaston (United States), Tara Gaston (United States), Roger Hanney (Australia), Sanghyeon Kim (South Korea), Dan Leiner (Luxembourg), Ron Schwebel (Australia), Shayne Stoik (Canada), Seung Chul Youn (South Korea)

2010

Paul Acheson (England), Samantha Gash (Australia), Peter Jong (Australia), Stan Lee (Canada), Terumasa Mori (Japan), David O'Brien (Ireland), Linda Quirk (United States) Lucy Rivers-Bulkeley (England), Philip Tye (England)

2008

Dean Karnazes (United States), Paul Liebenberg (South Africa)

== Individual race results ==
Times are shown in hours:minutes:seconds

=== Atacama Crossing (Chile) ===
Year	Men's Winner	Winning Time	Women's Winner	Winning Time
2014	(Spain) José Manuel Martínez Fernandez	25:57:58	(England) Emily Woodland	34:18:39
2013	(Zimbabwe) Daniel Rowland	26:17:51	(England) Rebecca Pattinson	35:38:09
2012	(Spain) Vicente Juan Garcia Beneito	23:46:51	(Germany) Anne-Marie Flammersfeld	29:49:53
2011	(Denmark) Anders Jensen	30:49:05	(Mexico) Nahila Hernandez San Juan	38:16:25
2010	(South Africa) Ryan Sandes	23:58:39	(England) Joanna Zakrzewski	33:37:30
2009	(Canada) Mehmet Danis	31:56:27	(Australia) Fleur Grose	37:31:54
2008	(United States) Dean Karnazes	31:49:44	(England) Mimi Anderson	43:15:16
2007	(New Zealand) Robert Jarvis	35:12:09	(England) Emma Dawber	47:09:35
2006	(Canada) Mark Tamminga	32:16:06	(Canada) Sandra McCallum	44:14:38
2004	(Taiwan) Kevin Lin	27:36:29	(United States) Lisanne Dorion	41:04:37

=== Gobi March (China) ===
Year	Men's Winner	Winning Time	Women's Winner	Winning Time
2014	(Spain) José Manuel Martínez Fernandez	25:56:34	(Mexico) Isis Breiter	37:02:06
2013	(Italy) Stefano Gregoretti	27:09:28	(United States) Shiri Leventhal	31:34:55
2012	(Spain) Vicente Juan Garcia Beneito	23:12:33	(Germany) Anne-Marie Flammersfeld	27:53:21
2011	(Australia) Damon Goerke	26:28:39	(Australia) Jennifer Madz	34:41:19
2010	(England) Dan Parr	24:53:36	(Singapore) Denvy Lo	33:25:49
2009	(United States) Eric LaHaie	26:43:50	(Republic of Ireland) Diana Hogan-Murphy	36:26:25
2008	(South Africa) Ryan Sandes	24:38:20	(United States) Lia Farley	32:09:35
2007	(Canada) Mark Tamminga	29:06:55	(England) Lucy Brooks	29:09:05
2006	(Taiwan) Byeung Sik Ahn	27:46:41	(Japan) Kazuko Kaihata	33:00:16
2005	(Russia) Evgeniy Gorkov	35:43:14	(United States) Lisanne Dorion	42:00:55
2003	(United States) Charles Engle Jr	30:58:22	(China) Ms Aletengtya	48:25:37

=== Sahara Race (Egypt) ===
Year	Men's Winner	Winning Time	Women's Winner	Winning Time
2014	(Jordan) Salameh Al Aqra	22:44:09	(Australia) Sandy Suckling	31:29:00
2012	(Spain) Vicente Juan Garcia Beneito	25:36:12	(Germany) Anne-Marie Flammersfeld	30:48:33
2011	(England) Dan Parr	25:13:22	(England) Sophie Collett	38:02:26
2010	(Denmark) Anders Jensen	26:56:28	(Italy) Katia Figini	32:03:29
2009	(Italy) Paolo Barghini	28:14:38	(South Africa) Erica Terblanche	38:15:02
2008	(South Africa) Ryan Sandes	27:09:17	(Germany) Nina Breith	32:50:37
2007	(Scotland) Andrew Murray	30:11:44	(Canada) Sandy McCallum	39:55:24
2006	(Denmark) Jimmi Olsen	26:55:04	(England) Claire Price	32:58:00
2005	(Canada) Ray Zahab	26:24:45	(United States) Theresa Schneider	32:18:54

=== Last Desert (Antarctica) ===
Overall results are calculated differently for The Last Desert (Antarctica) as weather and sea conditions make it difficult to cover a full 250 kilometers. In these cases, overall rankings are based on total distance covered rather than overall time.

Year	Men's Winner	Winning Distance	Women's Winner	Winning Distance
2014	(Spain) José Manuel Martínez Fernandez	163.30 km	(Mexico) Isis Breiter	121.60 km
2012	(Spain) Vicente Juan Garcia Beneito	200.35 km	(Germany) Anne-Marie Flammersfeld	186.95 km
2010	(South Africa) Ryan Sandes	230.50 km	(Republic of Ireland) Diana Hogan-Murphy	165.00 km
2008	(South Africa) Paul Liebenberg	76.98 km	(United States) Louise Cooper	59.68 km
2007	(United States) Joseph Holland	133.60 km		
2006	(United States) Scott Smith	29:06:37	(United States) Lisanne Dorian	35:35:40

=== Roving Races ===
Year	Location	Men's Winner	Winning Time	Women's Winner	Winning Time
2014	Madagascar	(South Africa) Ryan Sandes	22:46:42	(Japan) Maki Izuchi Suban	32:35:38
2013	Iceland	(Saudi Arabia) Mo Foustok	23:04:08	(United States) Lia Farley	27:12:26
2012	Jordan	(Italy) Paolo Barghini	27:11:03	(Italy) Katia Figini	29:37:03
2011	Nepal	(South Africa) Ryan Sandes	25:15:25	(Canada) Stephanie Case	30:15:09
2010	Australia	(Spain) Salvador Calvo Redondo	31:25:00	(United States) Lia Farley	32:34:18
2009	Namibia	(Spain) Salvador Calvo Redondo	25:47:32	(England) Lucy Hilton	29:17:45
2008	Vietnam	(Spain) Salvador Calvo Redondo	28:17:50	(Canada) Stephanie Case	32:53:22
