= Rainbow Valley (disambiguation) =

Rainbow Valley is the seventh book in the chronology of the Anne of Green Gables series

Rainbow Valley may also refer to:

== Places ==
- Rainbow Valley, Arizona, an unincorporated rural community in the United States
- Rainbow Valley (California), a valley in the United States
- Rainbow Valley (Chile), a valley in Chile
- Rainbow Valley Conservation Reserve, a protected area in Australia
- "Rainbow Valley", a place on Mount Everest, named after the colorful clothing on the bodies of the deceased mountaineers which lie there

== Other ==
- Rainbow Valley (film), a 1935 American Western film starring John Wayne
- Rainbow Valley (album), by Matt Corby
- "Rainbow Valley", originally "My Rainbow Valley", a song by The Love Affair from their 1968 album The Everlasting Love Affair
