= Ryan Sandes =

South African trail runner (born 1982)

Ryan Nicholas Sandes
- Born: March 10, 1982 (age 43); Cape Town
- Known for: trail running
- Website: ryansandes.com

Ryan "Hedgie" Nicholas Sandes (born 10 March 1982 in Cape Town) is a South African trail runner. In 2010 he became the first competitor to have won all four of the 4 Deserts races.

== Personal life ==
Sandes attended the South African College Schools (S.A.C.S.) where he took part in cricket, rugby and water polo. He was awarded a BSc degree in Construction and later an Honours in Quantity Surveying at the University of Cape Town. In addition to trail running, he is an active mountain biker, paddler and surfer.

== Running career ==
In 2008, Sandes won the Sahara Race and the Gobi March. In 2009 he placed second in RacingThePlanet Namibia, and won the Jungle Ultra Marathon in Floresta Nacional do Tapajós in Pará, Brazil, setting a new course record. In 2010 he set a record time for the 4Peaks Mountain Challenge.

Also in 2010, Sandes became the first competitor to have won all four of the 4 Deserts races, each a 6/7-day, 250-kilometer (160 mi) self-supported footrace: through the Atacama Desert in Chile, the Gobi Desert in China, the Sahara Desert in Egypt, and lastly through Antarctica. This achievement prompted Mary Gadams, founder and CEO of RacingThePlanet and organiser of the event, to state “Ryan Sandes is clearly one of the top endurance athletes in the world - to have won all 4 Deserts is a remarkable accomplishment.” At the time, only 81 individuals had completed all four trails, and 11 competitors had done them in the same calendar year. In 2010, Time magazine included the 4 Deserts Challenge on a list of the ten most demanding endurance races in the world.

Sandes won the 2011 Leadville Trail 100 in a time of 16:46:54, more than half an hour ahead of runner-up Dylan Bowman. He won the 2012 North Face 100 in Australia in a time of 9:22:45.

In August 2012, he bettered Russell Pasche's record for the 90K Fish River Canyon hiking trail from 10:54 to 6:57.

In 2014, he won the second race in the Ultra-Trail World Series Tour, the Transgrancanaria.

In 2017, he won the Western States Endurance Run, in 16 hours 19 minutes 37 seconds.

=== Pair running ===
In 2014, Sandes and Ryno Griesel set a fastest known time (FKT) on the Drakensberg Grand Traverse (DGT), an unmarked and self-navigated route across the main Drakensberg escarpment between South Africa and Lesotho, covering 200km of distance and 9000m of elevation gain.

In 2018, they set a new FKT for the Great Himalaya Trail (GHT), running 1,504 km in 24 days 4 hours and 24 minutes.

== See also ==
- Cape Town Trail Marathon
