= Turia Pitt =

Australian ultra-marathon runner (born 1986)

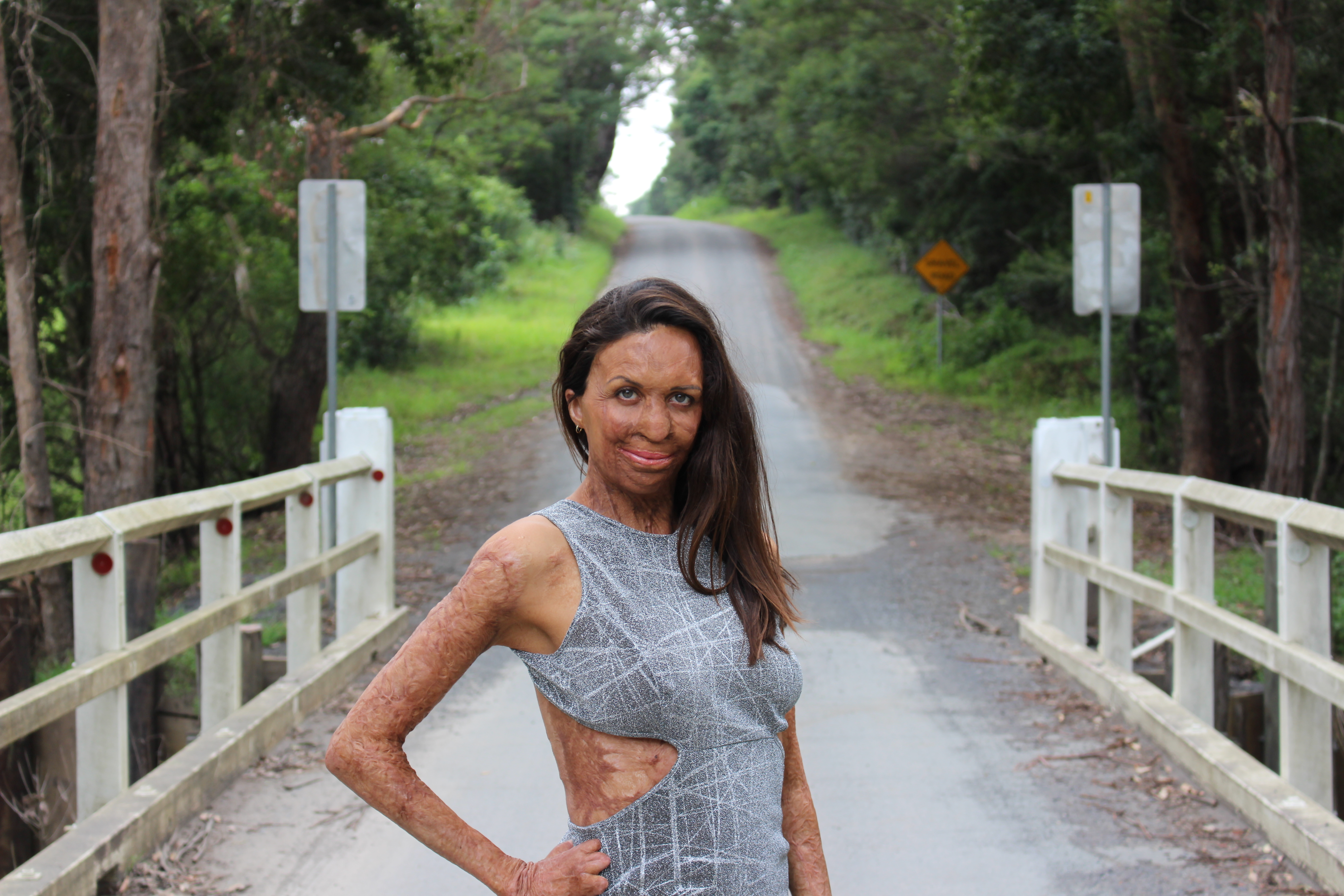
- Pitt in 2018
- Born: 24 July 1987 (age 39); Tahiti, French Polynesia
- Education: University of New South Wales (BEng, BSc)
- Occupations: Athlete; author; motivational speaker; television personality
- Known for: Surviving severe burns during an ultramarathon
- Notable work: Ambassador for Interplast Australia & New Zealand
- Partner: Michael Hoskin
- Children: 2
- Parent: Celestine Vaite (mother)

Turia Pitt (born 24 July 1987) is an Australian athlete, motivational speaker and author.

== Accident and later life ==
On 2 September 2011, Pitt was competing in a 100 km ultramarathon through Western Australia's Kimberley region, when she was caught in a large bush fire. During a subsequent inquiry, she stated there was "nowhere else to go" when the competitors tried to outrun an out-of-control blaze that swept up Selena Gorge, just outside Kununurra. Pitt sustained burns to 65 percent of her body. It was several hours before medical help arrived and she was air-lifted out. Doctors did not expect her to survive her injuries.

The parliamentary inquiry into the Kimberley Ultramarathon was damning of the race organisers, RacingThePlanet. Among other things, it was revealed that the organisers were unable to communicate properly between checkpoints.

Pitt launched Supreme Court action against RacingThePlanet, and in May 2014, it was reported that an out-of-court settlement had been reached.

Pitt has been profiled by the Australian television program 60 Minutes, Women's Weekly and One Plus One. She has become a sought-after public speaker, appearing at such events as the TEDx Macquarie University conference in September 2014, giving an inspirational talk titled Unmask your Potential.

Pitt has mentored thousands through her online programs, raised funds and awareness for a variety of philanthropic concerns, and authored three books: Everything to Live For, Unmasked (also available as Young Adult edition) and Happy (and Other Ridiculous Aspirations). In 2018, she joined Anthony Robins as a headliner at the 2018 National Achievers Congress in Brisbane.

In 2014, Pitt was named the New South Wales Premier's Award for Woman of the Year and was a finalist for Young Australian of the Year. In 2016, she was a finalist in the Australian of the Year award, and the New South Wales finalist for Telstra Business Woman of the Year award. A cover story about her in The Australian Women's Weekly attracted worldwide media attention.

She is an Ambassador for Interplast Australia & New Zealand, and has raised money for the organisation by leading trekking adventures. In that capacity, she walked the Great Wall of China in 2014, the Inca Trail in 2015, and the Kokoda Track in 2016. Through this work, along with her support for other Interplast Australia & New Zealand fundraising initiatives, she has directly and indirectly contributed to more than $1 million being raised to support the organisation's work.

Turia Pitt is also a motivational speaker and regularly appears at conferences and events.

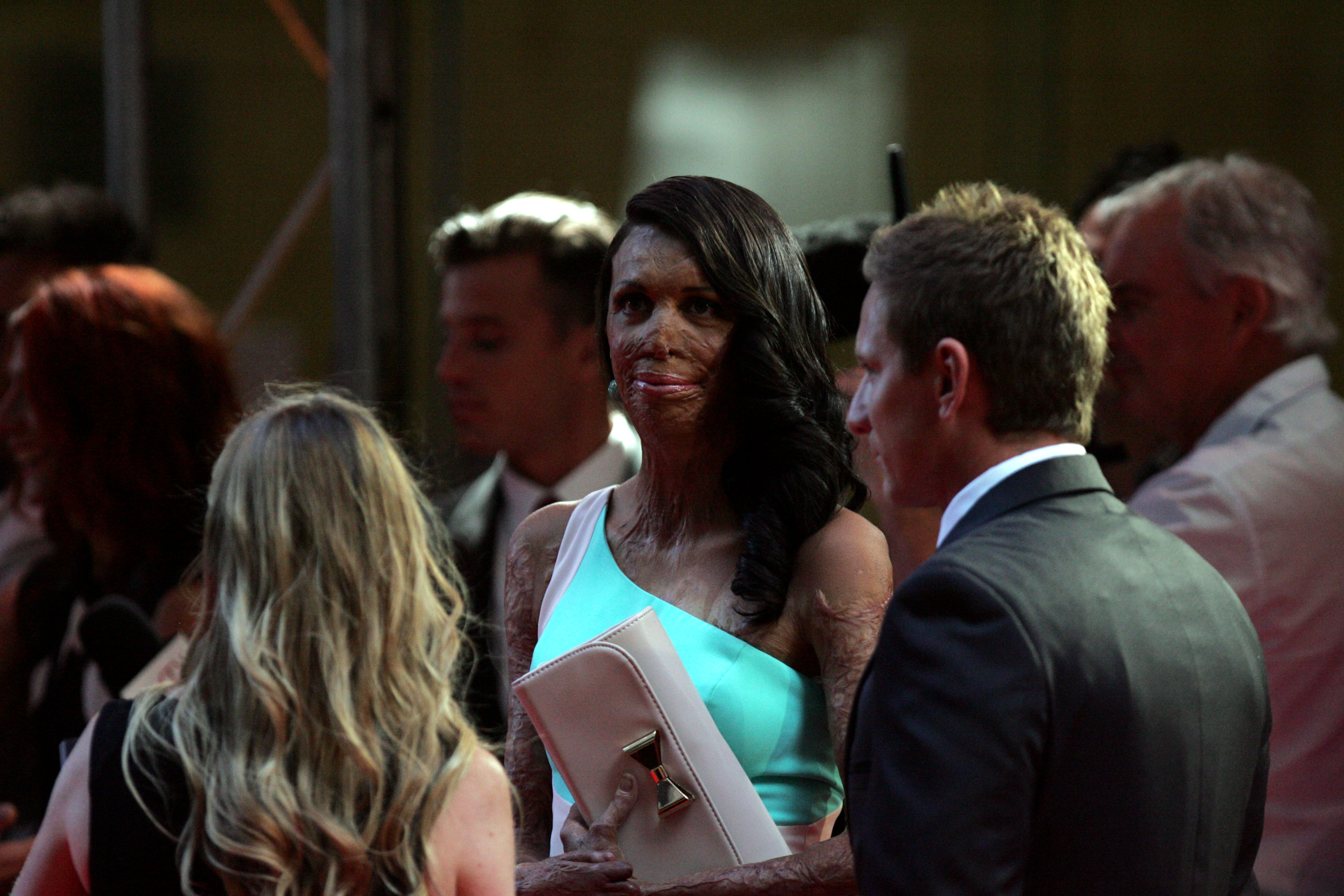
Turia Pitt and Michael Hoskin at an event evening

In 2022, Pitt appeared as a contestant on the sixth season of The Celebrity Apprentice Australia. She also launched her podcast, "Hard Work".

== Medical problems ==
Before the ultramarathon incident, Pitt was a healthy, fit athlete. As a result of her injuries in the fire, she was placed in a medically induced coma for a month. All the fingers of her right hand and two fingers on her left had to be amputated. She endured six months in the hospital, underwent over 200 operations and spent two years in recovery. During that time, she was required to wear a full-body compression suit and mask and only remove it for an hour daily. The mask was needed to help smooth out the scars on her face and body. She removed it for the first time on the 60 Minutes programme, revealing her face to the world on TV.

== Personal life ==
Pitt spent her childhood in Ulladulla, a small town in New South Wales. She attended Ulladulla Public School and Ulladulla High School. During her youth, she was well known for her athletic abilities and also performed well academically. She went on to the University of New South Wales (UNSW), where she completed a Bachelor of Engineering (Mining) / Bachelor of Science in 2010.

On 8 May 2016, Pitt competed in her first Ironman Australia competition, finishing in a time of 13:24:42. On 8 October 2016, she completed the Ironman World Championship at Kailua-Kona, Hawaii, with a time of 14:37:30.

Pitt and her fiancé announced on 21 July 2017 that they were expecting a boy. On 7 December 2017, she gave birth to their son, Hakavai Hoskin.

On 9 February 2020, Turia announced on her Instagram page that she and fiancé Michael Hoskin welcomed their second child, another son, named Rahiti Hoskin.

== Books ==
To date, Pitt has authored three books:

- Everything to Live For (2013)
- Unmasked (2017)
- Happy (and Other Ridiculous Aspirations) (2022)
