= Kevin Lin (athlete) =

Taiwanese long-distance runner

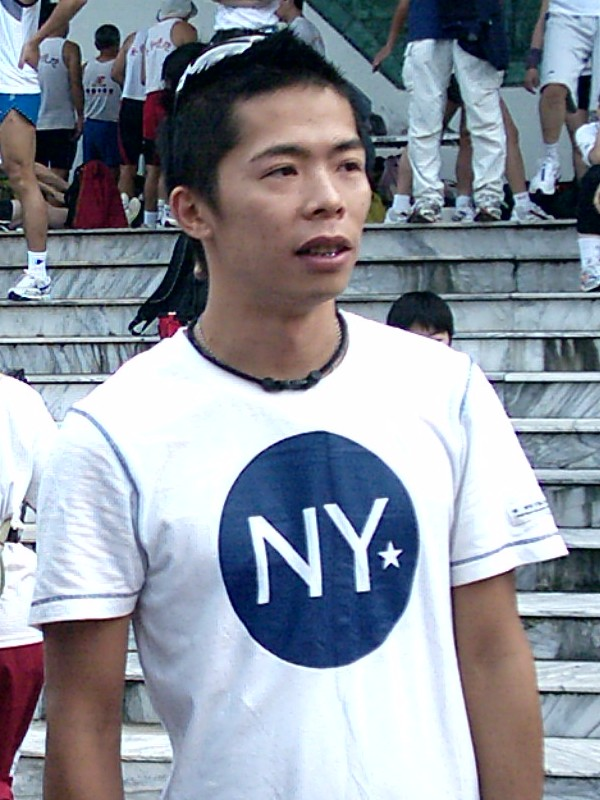
- Kevin Lin in 2006

Personal information
- Native name: 林義傑
- Nationality: Taiwanese
- Born: November 19, 1976 (age 49) Taipei, Taiwan
- Home town: Taipei, Taiwan
- Education: Tianmu Campus, University of Taipei; National Chung Cheng University; National Taiwan University; National Chengchi University
- Occupation: ultramarathon runner

Sport
- Country: Taiwan
- Sport: Running

Kevin Lin

Vice Chairperson of the Cultural Communication Commission of Kuomintang
- Incumbent
- Assumed office October 2021
- Chairman: Eric Chu
- Leader: See list: Ling Tao Wang Yu-min Hung Mong-kai Lin Kuang-yu Lee Yen-hsiu

Personal details
- Party: Kuomintang
- Relatives: Fifi Wang (media personality; cousin)

Kevin Lin (林義傑, November 19, 1976) is a Taiwanese ultramarathon runner from Taipei and politician who served as the vice chairperson of the Cultural Communication Commission of the Kuomintang (Nationality Party).

== Background ==
Based in Taipei, Lin is one of the best known endurance athletes in Asia. Lin, together with Charlie Engle and Ray Zahab, became the first modern runner to cross the Sahara Desert on February 21, 2007.

He had agreed to work with the H_{2}O Africa project and be part of the first team of runners to cross the Sahara from coast to coast. The expedition was filmed and edited into a documentary, Running the Sahara, narrated by Matt Damon and released in November 2007 with the logistics support of Sam Rutherford.

The Running the Sahara project began in Senegal and went through Mauritania, Mali, Niger, and Libya before culminating in Egypt.

A full-time graduate student, he won his first ever 150-mile (241-kilometer) race across the Atacama Desert in Chile in 2004.

In September 2011 he completed an unprecedented 10,000-kilometer run of the Silk Road.

In 2016, he executive produced the sports film 10,000 Miles which stars Sean Huang, Megan Lai and Darren Wang.
