= Cape Town Trail Marathon =

Marathon distance trail running event

- Location: Cape Town, South Africa
- Event type: Mountain running
- Distance: Marathon
- Established: 2021; 5 years ago
- Course records: Men's: 03:50:16 (2025); Philani Sengce (RSA); Women's: 4:38:27 (2024); Catherine Williamson (GBR)
- Website: capetowntrailmarathon.com

The Cape Town Trail Marathon by Ryan Sandes is an annual marathon distance (46 km) mountain running event held in Cape Town, South Africa.

In partnership with Ryan Sandes, the Sanlam Cape Town Marathon presents the Cape Town Trail Marathon. This mountain marathon includes a 46km marathon, 22km trail and 11km trail which all run through the Table Mountain National Park:

- The King Protea (46km, elevation gain: 1 885m)
- The Stately Protea (22km, elevation gain: 830m)
- The Pincushion Protea (11km, elevation gain: 390m).

== Winners ==
Key: Course record

Ed.	Year	Men's winner	Time	Women's winner	Time	Rf.
1	2021	Johardt van Heerden (RSA)	4:17:23	Toni McCann (RSA)	05:03:15	
2	2022	Kane Reilly (RSA)	4:14:14	Landie Greyling (RSA)	5:24:23	
3	2023	Daniel Claassen (RSA)	4:25:08	Samantha Reilly (RSA)	5:09:11	
4	2024	Collin Kanyimo (ZIM)	3:59:42	Catherine Williamson (GBR)	4:38:27	
5	2025	Philani Sengce (RSA)	03:50:16	Landie Greyling (RSA)	04:46:47	
6	2026	Philani Sengce (RSA)	03:48:15	Maryke van Zyl (RSA)	05:05:12	
