= 4 Peaks Mountain Challenge =

Coordinates: 28°37′S 28°01′E

The K- Way 4Peaks Mountain Challenge is a rugged 24 kilometres (15 mi) mountain skyline route for trail runners, held every September since 2002 in the Witteberge 32 kilometres (20 mi) north-northeast of Ficksburg in South Africa's Free State province near the Lesotho border.

A record field of 210 mountain runners tackled the route in 2010. The large number of entrants necessitated a start of 3 batches at 15 min intervals. Ryan Sandes, the 2010 men's winner, set a new record time of 2h 41m 58s. Fit athletes complete the course in about 6hrs with the backmarkers finishing in about 9hrs.

The skyline route runs clockwise around an amphitheatre curving around the valley of Moolmanshoek. Starting at 1750m, the first high peak is 'The Pyramid' at 2167m. There are some sections of fairly flat terrain along the high ridges. Grassy tussocks form a large part of the landscape, broken by rock bands and steep scrambles to reach the saddles and high points.

The route rates as extremely demanding, but is made bearable by spectacular mountain scenery. The start and finish are at the Moolmanshoek Private Game Reserve.
