= Célestine Hitiura Vaite =

French Polynesian writer (born 1966)

Célestine Hitiura Vaite (born 1966) is a French Polynesian writer.

== Early life ==
The daughter of a Tahitian mother and a French father, Vaite grew up in the commune of Faaa (Faa'a) on the island of Tahiti, French Polynesia. In her youth, Vaite grew up immersed in traditional storytelling. Having won a scholarship to a leading girls' school in Papeete (Pape'ete), she became interested in works by French authors like Balzac, Flaubert, Zola and Maupassant.

== Career ==
Though she is a native French speaker, Vaite notably writes in English. She began to write out of homesickness while pregnant with her third child in Australia. Vaite has stated that writing in English gives her a wider audience as well as a greater creative freedom.

Her first three novels—Breadfruit, Frangipani, and Tiare—follow Materena Mahi, a "professional cleaner" who lives in Faʻaʻā. The novels describe life in contemporary Tahiti from an inside perspective, through anecdotes and often with great humor. Vaite thus brings attention on a region of the world that Western literature has relegated to travel guides or often described in exotic terms.

Her first two novels have been translated into French. L'arbre à pain, the French translation of Breadfruit, was warmly greeted in French Polynesia, where it was awarded the Prix littéraire des étudiants by the students of the University of French Polynesia in 2004. L'arbre à pain is also reputed to be the most widely read book in French Polynesia. Frangipani, which has been published in 14 countries to date, was shortlisted for the 2005 NSW Premier's Literary Awards and longlisted for the 2006 Orange Prize.

Vaite was approached by New Zealand musician Tim Finn in 2018 to collaborate on his opera Ihitai 'Avei'a - Star Navigator about navigator and priest Tupaia who accompanied Cook on the Endeavour's maiden voyage, and she wrote monologues in Tahitian to accompany the songs, making Ihitai 'Avei'a the first opera to be performed in English and Tahitian.

== Personal life ==
Vaite currently lives in New South Wales, Australia, and has four children. She is the mother of former model, athlete, and bushfire survivor Turia Pitt. Vaite is amicably separated from her husband.

== Bibliography ==
- Breadfruit, 2000, Winner of the Prix littéraire des étudiants 2004
- Frangipani, 2004
- Tiare, 2006

== Sources ==
- "Célestine Hitiura Vaite." 22 January 2006. https://web.archive.org/web/20060414014747/http://celestinevaite.com/
- Vaite, Célestine Hitiura. Frangipani. New York: Back Bay Books, 2006.
