= The Celebrity Apprentice Australia season 6 =

Television show 2022 season

The Celebrity Apprentice Australia
- Season 6
- Starring: Lord Alan Sugar (CEO); Janine Allis (advisor); Nick Bell (advisor); Natasha Young (executive assistant)
- No. of contestants: 16
- Winner: Benji Marshall
- No. of episodes: 16

Release
- Original network: Nine Network
- Original release: 22 May – 21 June 2022

Season chronology
- ← Previous; Season 5

The sixth season of The Celebrity Apprentice Australia premiered on the Nine Network on 22 May 2022. British business magnate and The Apprentice UK host, Lord Alan Sugar leads the series as CEO, with Janine Allis returning as a boardroom advisor and Nick Bell as new advisor. Natasha Young returns as glamorous executive assistant Miss Moneypenny.

== Production ==
In September 2021, the series was renewed for a sixth season with Lord Alan Sugar returning as CEO, and revealing Turia Pitt and Will & Woody as some of the competing celebrities. On 17 October 2021, Nine announced the full list of celebrities competing in the season.

== Candidates ==
Candidate	Background	Original team	Charity	Result	Raised
Benji Marshall	NRL Champion	Collaborate	Souths Cares	The Celebrity Apprentice (21-06-2022)	$547,105
Darren McMullen	TV Host	Collaborate	Feel The Magic	Lost in the Season Finale (21-06-2022)	$412,617
Ronnie Caceres	Reality TV star	Collaborate	Habitat for Humanity Australia	Fired in Task 15 (20-06-2022)	$97,831
Amy Shark	ARIA Award Winning Musician	Innovate	Support Act	Fired in Task 15 (20-06-2022)	$20,000
Jean Kittson	Comedy Queen	Innovate	Taldumande Youth Services	Fired in Task 14 (15-06-2022)	$20,000
Bronte Campbell	Olympic swimmer	Innovate	Carers Australia	Fired in Task 13 (14-06-2022)	$60,000
Turia Pitt	Motivational Speaker	Innovate	Interplast	Fired in Task 12 (13-06-2022)	$310,000
Beck Zemek	Married at First Sight bride	Innovate	Royal Hospital for Women	Fired in Task 11^{1} (07-06-2022)	$23,952
Ben James (Carla from Bankstown)	Comedic Drag Queen	Innovate	Twenty10	Fired in Task 10 (06-06-2022)	$40,000
Will & Woody	National Radio duo	Collaborate	Gotach4life Foundation	Fired in Task 9 (05-06-2022)	$20,000
Eloni Vunakece	Former NRL player/ Ninja Warrior star	Collaborate	Headache Australia	Fired in Task 8^{2} (01-06-2022)	$20,000
Samantha Jade	Singer/Songwriter	Innovate	Cancer Council Australia	Fired in Task 7 (31-05-2022)	$0
Jarrod Scott	International Model	Collaborate	Citizens of the Great Barrier Reef	Fired in Task 6 (30-05-2022)	$0
Vince Colosimo	Award winning actor	Collaborate	Dementia Australia	Fired in Task 5 (29-05-2022)	$0
Gamble Breaux	Real Housewife	Innovate	Animal Welfare League NSW	Fired in Task 4 (25-05-2022)	$0
Jodi Gordon	Soapstar	Innovate	Starlight Children's Foundation	Fired in Task 3 (24-05-2022)	$0

^1Beck was originally fired in task 1, but was brought back into the competition during task 5.
^2Eloni was originally fired in task 2, but was brought back into the competition during task 5.

== Episode results ==
Candidate	Original Team	Task 5 Team	Task 6 Team	Task 7 Team	Task 11 Team	Application Result	Record as project manager
Benji Marshall	Collaborate	Innovate	Collaborate	Collaborate	Innovate	The Celebrity Apprentice	3-0 (win in tasks 3, 13 & 15)
Darren McMullen	Collaborate	Innovate	Innovate	Innovate	Collaborate	Fired in final task	3-1 (win in tasks 1, 12 & 14, loss in task 8)
Ronnie Caceres	Collaborate	Collaborate	Collaborate	Collaborate	Collaborate	Fired in task 15	2-1 (win in tasks 6 & 10, loss in task 13)
Amy Shark				Innovate	Innovate	Fired in task 15	1-1 (win in Task 9, loss in Task 12)
Jean Kittson	Innovate	Innovate	Innovate	Innovate	Innovate	Fired in task 14	1-2 (win in task 2, loss in tasks 10 & 14)
Bronte Campbell	Innovate	Innovate	Innovate	Innovate	Collaborate	Fired in task 13	0-2 (loss in tasks 3 & 11)
Turia Pitt	Innovate	Collaborate	Collaborate	Collaborate	Innovate	Fired in task 12	1-1 (win in task 11, loss in task 1)
Beck Zemek	Innovate	Redemption	Collaborate	Collaborate	Collaborate	Fired in tasks 1 & 11	1-1 (win in task 8, loss in task 7)
Carla from Bankstown/Ben James	Innovate	Innovate	Innovate	Innovate		Fired in task 10	2-0 (win in tasks 5 & 7)
Will & Woody	Collaborate	Collaborate	Collaborate	Collaborate		Fired in task 9	1-1 (win in task 4, loss in task 9)
Eloni Vunakece	Collaborate	Redemption	Innovate	Innovate		Fired in tasks 2 & 8	0-1 (loss in task 6)
Samantha Jade	Innovate	Collaborate	Collaborate	Collaborate		Fired in task 7	0-1 (loss in task 4)
Jarrod Scott	Collaborate	Innovate	Innovate			Fired in task 6	0-1 (loss in task 2)
Vince Colosimo	Collaborate	Collaborate				Fired in task 5	0-1 (loss in task 5)
Gamble Breaux	Innovate	Redemption				Fired in task 4	
Jodi Gordon	Innovate	Redemption				Fired in task 3	

No.	Candidate	Elimination chart															
No.	Candidate	1	2	3	4	5	6	7	8	9	10	11	12	13	14	15	16
1	Benji	IN	IN	WIN	IN	IN	IN	IN	IN	IN	IN	IN	BR	WIN	BR	WIN	CA
2	Darren	WIN	IN	IN	IN	IN	IN	IN	LOSE	IN	BR	IN	WIN	BR	WIN	IN	FIRED
3	Ronnie	IN	IN	IN	IN	BR	WIN	BR	IN	BR	WIN	BR	IN	LOSE	IN	FIRED	
4	Amy							IN	IN	WIN	IN	IN	LOSE	IN	BR	FIRED	
5	Jean	IN	WIN	IN	IN	IN	IN	IN	IN	IN	LOSE	IN	IN	IN	FIRED		
6	Bronte	IN	IN	LOSE	IN	IN	IN	IN	BR	IN	IN	LOSE	IN	FIRED			
7	Turia	LOSE	IN	BR	BR	BR	IN	IN	IN	BR	IN	WIN	FIRED				
8	Beck	FIRED				SAVED	IN	LOSE	WIN	IN	IN	FIRED					
9	Carla	IN	IN	IN	IN	WIN	BR	WIN	IN	IN	FIRED						
10	Will & Woody	IN	IN	IN	WIN	IN	IN	IN	IN	FIRED							
11	Eloni	IN	FIRED			SAVED	LOSE	IN	FIRED								
12	Samantha	IN	IN	IN	LOSE	IN	IN	FIRED									
13	Jarrod	IN	LOSE	IN	IN	IN	FIRED										
14	Vince	IN	BR	IN	IN	FIRED											
15	Gamble	BR	IN	IN	FIRED	LOSE											
16	Jodi	IN	IN	FIRED		LOSE											

The candidate won the competition and was named the Celebrity Apprentice.
The candidate won as project manager on his/her team.
The candidate lost as project manager on his/her team.
The candidate was on the losing team.
The candidate was brought to the final boardroom.
The candidate was fired.
The candidate lost as project manager and was fired.
The candidate won their place back in the competition in a Redemption task.
The candidate did not participate in the task.

== Tasks ==
=== Task 1 ===
Airdate: 22 May 2022

Team Collaborate Project Manager	Team Innovate Project Manager
Darren McMullen	Turia Pitt
Task
To organise and host the ultimate charity golf tournament
Winning Team	Losing Team
Team Collaborate	Team Innovate
Reasons for victory	Reasons for loss
Raised the most money - $365,000.	Raised the least money - $235,000
Sent to Final Boardroom
Turia Pitt, Beck Zemek, Gamble Breaux
Fired
Beck Zemek - despite bringing in the most money for her team, she was fired for not being a team player and causing divisions within the group.
Notes
Darren's charity received the proceeds of both teams' tournaments - $600,000 - making him the single largest earner from a Celebrity Apprentice task so far, however in Episode 2 he decided to split profits with Innovate team leader Turia Pitt.

=== Task 2 ===
Airdate: 23 May 2022

Team Innovate Project Manager	Team Collaborate Project Manager
Jean Kittson	Jarrod Scott
Task
Run a food delivery service. The team who receives the best customer feedback wins $20,000 for their Project Manager's charity.
Winning Team	Losing Team
Team Innovate	Team Collaborate
Reasons for victory	Reasons for loss
Delivered sixteen meals with an average rating of 2.8/5	Delivered eleven meals with an average rating of 2.7/5
Sent to Final Boardroom
Eloni Vunakece, Jarrod Scott, Vince Colosimo
Fired
Eloni Vunakece - Lord Sugar was not sure what Eloni had done in either of the first two tasks.

=== Task 3 ===
Airdate: 24 May 2022

Team Collaborate Project Manager	Team Innovate Project Manager
Benji Marshall	Bronte Campbell
Task
Develop and host a wellness retreat. The team who receives the best value-for-money retreat wins $20,000 for their Project Manager's charity.
Winning Team	Losing Team
Team Collaborate	Team Innovate
Reasons for victory	Reasons for loss
60% of their guests said their retreat offered value-for-money.	30% of their guests said their retreat offered value-for-money.
Sent to Final Boardroom
Bronte Campbell, Jodi Gordon, Turia Pitt
Fired
Jodi Gordon - for not contributing during the task and being singled-out during the feedback as leading the weakest part of the retreat.

=== Task 4 ===
Airdate: 25 May 2022

Team Collaborate Project Manager	Team Innovate Project Manager
Will & Woody	Samantha Jade
Task
While disguised, find ten items from a list and negotiate the best price for those items within three hours around Newtown. The team who gets the items for the lowest amount of money wins $20,000 for the Project Manager's charity. The Project Manager is not allowed to negotiate.
Winning Team	Losing Team
Team Collaborate	Team Innovate
Reasons for victory	Reasons for loss
Spent $1065, including a $100 fine.	Spent $1085
Sent to Final Boardroom
Samantha Jade, Gamble Breaux, Turia Pitt
Fired
Gamble Breaux - she wasted time negotiating for the wrong tea set at the beginning of the challenge, putting her team on the back foot.

=== Task 5 ===
Airdate: 29 May 2022

Team Innovate Project Manager	Team Collaborate Project Manager
Carla from Bankstown/Ben James	Vince Colosimo
Team Reshuffle
Samantha and Turia move to Collaborate. Jarrod, Benji and Darren move to Innovate
Task
Create a live infomercial. The team that produces the most effective informercial wins $20,000 for the Project Manager's charity
Winning Team	Losing Team
Team Innovate	Team Collaborate
Reasons for victory	Reasons for loss
Produced the most polished infomercial	Missed their on-air cue by seven seconds
Sent to Final Boardroom
Vince Colosimo, Turia Pitt, Ronnie Caceres
Fired
Vince Colosimo - for lack of time management in the task and getting into an argument with Nick Bell after his team missed their on-air cue.
Notes
The episode introduced a Redemption Challenge, where the four previously fired contestants would attempt the task as part of a third team. The strongest performers in Team Redemption would be invited to rejoin the competition.

Redemption Challenge
Task
Create a live infomercial. The people who produce the most effective informercial win their place back in the competition.
Re-fired
Gamble Breaux & Jodi Gordon
Returned to Competition
Eloni Vunakece & Beck Zemek

=== Task 6 ===
Airdate: 30 May 2022

Team Collaborate Project Manager	Team Innovate Project Manager
Ronnie Caceres	Eloni Vunakece
Team Reshuffle
Benji moves to Collaborate.
Task
Bring your most prized possession to sell for charity at a car boot sale. The team makes the most money wins $20,000 for the Project Manager's charity.
Winning Team	Losing Team
Team Collaborate	Team Innovate
Reasons for victory	Reasons for loss
Raised the most money - $65,136	Raised the least money - $62,695
Sent to Final Boardroom
Eloni Vunakece, Carla from Bankstown/Ben James, Jarrod Scott
Fired
Jarrod Scott - for not being a team player, Janine was unimpressed with his attitude and participation in the challenge.
Notes
Beck and Eloni returned and joined Team Collaborate and Team Innovate respectively. Even though she was on the losing team, Bronte was allowed to keep the $50,000 for which her item sold, for her charity.

=== Task 7 ===
Airdate: 31 May 2022

Team Innovate Project Manager	Team Collaborate Project Manager
Carla from Bankstown/Ben James	Beck Zemek
Task
Design and model an intimate apparel line for the women in charge at Honey Birdette. The team with the highest score will win the challenge and $20,000 for the Project Managers' charity.
Winning Team	Losing Team
Team Innovate	Team Collaborate
Reasons for victory	Reasons for loss
Received a score of 81.4%	Received a score of 30.4%
Sent to Final Boardroom
Beck Zemek, Ronnie Caceres, Samantha Jade
Fired
Samantha Jade - for her poor catwalk performance, she was put in charge of designing the lingerie and decided on a sparkling gold material for all of the pieces.
Notes
Amy Shark joined the competition from this episode. She chose to join Team Innovate.

=== Task 8 ===
Airdate: 1 Jun 2022

Team Collaborate Project Manager	Team Innovate Project Manager
Beck Zemek	Darren McMullen
Task
Hold a Clearance Sale. The team who makes the most profit wins $20,000 and both teams' profits for their Project Manager's charity.
Winning Team	Losing Team
Team Collaborate	Team Innovate
Reasons for victory	Reasons for loss
Made $2,440.	Made $1,512.
Sent to Final Boardroom
Darren McMullen, Eloni Vunakece, Bronte Campbell
Fired
Eloni Vunakece - Lord Sugar felt he'd reached as far as he could go in the process.
Notes
Lord Sugar gave Eloni a donation for his charity after he was fired.

=== Task 9 ===
Airdate: 5 Jun 2022

Team Innovate Project Manager	Team Collaborate Project Manager
Amy Shark	Will & Woody
Task
Create an original storybook for a young demographic and present it in front of a crowd of tiny tots and their parents. The team has the most votes wins $20,000 for the Project Manager's charity, as well as a "special power" - which would be revealed in the following episode.
Winning Team	Losing Team
Team Innovate	Team Collaborate
Reasons for victory	Reasons for loss
Received 15 votes.	Received 13 votes.
Sent to Final Boardroom
Will & Woody, Ronnie Caceres, Turia Pitt
Fired
Will & Woody - for putting themselves in charge of writing during the challenge and taking full responsibility for their team's loss.

=== Task 10 ===
Airdate: 6 Jun 2022

Team Collaborate Project Manager	Team Innovate Project Manager
Ronnie Caceres	Jean Kittson
Task
Run a successful bucks and hens night. The team successfully fulfils all of their contractual obligations wins $20,000 for the Project Manager's charity. Due to being the winning Project Manager the previous week, Amy was given immunity from the task and got to choose the project managers.
Winning Team	Losing Team
Team Collaborate	Team Innovate
Reasons for victory	Reasons for loss
Fully signed and executed all of their contracts	Completed one out of three contracts
Sent to Final Boardroom
Jean Kittson, Carla from Bankstown/Ben James, Darren McMullen
Fired
Carla from Bankstown/Ben James - for failing to fill out the paperwork.

=== Task 11 ===
Airdate: 7 Jun 2022

Team Innovate Project Manager	Team Collaborate Project Manager
Turia Pitt	Bronte Campbell
Team Reshuffle
Bronte and Darren move to Team Collaborate. Turia and Benji move to Team Innovate.
Task
Deliver a guerilla marketing campaign for Subway. The winning team will be decided by Lord Sugar and Subway Australia's CEO. Subway will award $20,000 to the charity of the winning Project Manager.
Winning Team	Losing Team
Team Innovate	Team Collaborate
Reasons for victory	Reasons for loss
Successfully communicated the Subway message in their attempts.	Lack of media coverage
Sent to Final Boardroom
Bronte Campbell, Ronnie Caceres, Beck Zemek
Fired
Beck Zemek - for being weak in the task.
Notes
Before the results were revealed, Turia & Bronte agreed to split the winnings between their two charities.

=== Task 12 ===
Airdate: 13 Jun 2022

Team Collaborate Project Manager	Team Innovate Project Manager
Darren McMullen	Amy Shark
Task
Conceive, script, shoot and edit a short form piece of content inspired by social media influencers, the Inspired Unemployed. Jack and Matt will be judging the videos and will decide who will win $20,000 for the Project Manager's charity.
Winning Team	Losing Team
Team Collaborate	Team Innovate
Reasons for victory	Reasons for loss
Although their video was edited poorly, it was well-executed.	The self-deprecating humor was on-brand but the narrative was confusing.
Sent to Final Boardroom
Amy Shark, Benji Marshall, Turia Pitt
Fired
Turia Pitt - for being responsible for the muddled narrative of the video.

=== Task 13 ===
Airdate: 14 Jun 2022

Team Collaborate Project Manager	Team Innovate Project Manager
Ronnie Caceres	Benji Marshall
Task
Set up a pet photography studio and service members of the public and their animal friends. The team that nabs the most sales after refunds will win $20,000 towards their Project Manager's charity.
Winning Team	Losing Team
Team Innovate	Team Collaborate
Reasons for victory	Reasons for loss
Brought in $2,956.98 after refunds.	Brought in $2,396.00 after refunds.
Sent to Final Boardroom
Ronnie Caceres, Darren McMullen, Bronte Campbell
Fired
Bronte Campbell - for not contributing as much as Ronnie and Darren to the task.

=== Task 14 ===
Airdate: 15 Jun 2022

Team Collaborate Project Manager	Team Innovate Project Manager
Darren McMullen	Jean Kittson
Task
Create a sharable video for MYOB. The finished product will be judged by MYOB rather than Lord Sugar and MYOB will give the winning Project Manager $20,000 for their charity.
Winning Team	Losing Team
Team Collaborate	Team Innovate
Reasons for victory	Reasons for loss
They had a great singled-minded proposition and did a good job at explaining how MYOB can help business.	They demonstrated the product really well but MYOB thought the mixed storyline was confusing.
Sent to Final Boardroom
Jean Kittson, Amy Shark, Benji Marshall
Fired
Jean Kittson - for her poor video performance. She was responsible for the directing the video which her team lost the task.

=== Task 15 ===
Airdate: 20 Jun 2022

Task
Pitch a story about their lives to a panel of executives from streaming giant Stan. The best pitch wins a place in the Grand Final, leaving the other three to convince Lord Sugar that they should receive the second spot in the Final.
Winning Contestant	Losing Contestants
Benji Marshall	Amy Shark; Ronnie Caceres; Darren McMullen
Sent to Final Boardroom
Amy Shark, Darren McMullen, Ronnie Caceres
Fired
Amy Shark & Ronnie Caceres - Lord Sugar chooses Darren to participate in the grand final.

=== Task 16 ===
Airdate: 21 Jun 2022

Finale Celebrities
Benji Marshall & Darren McMullen
Task
Hold a charity event with a budget of $25,000 for their charities.
Fired
Darren McMullen
The Celebrity Apprentice
Benji Marshall
Notes
The Celebrity Apprentice won all their earnings from their charity event and an additional A$100,000 for their chosen charity. The runner-up also won their earnings from their charity event for their chosen charity.

== Ratings ==
No.	Title	Air date	Timeslot	Overnight ratings		Ref(s)
No.	Title	Air date	Timeslot	Viewers	Rank	Ref(s)
1	"Task 1: Golf Tournament & Boardroom"	22 May 2022	Sunday 7:00 pm	404,000	8	
2	"Task 2: Food Delivery & Boardroom"	23 May 2022	Monday 7:30 pm	367,000	17	
3	"Task 3: Wellness Retreat & Boardroom"	24 May 2022	Tuesday 7:30 pm	401,000	12	
4	"Task 4: Scavenger Hunt & Boardroom"	25 May 2022	Wednesday 7:30 pm	373,000	14	
5	"Task 5: Infomercial & Boardroom"	29 May 2022	Sunday 7:00 pm	390,000	8	
6	"Task 6: Car Boot Sale & Boardroom"	30 May 2022	Monday 7:30 pm	400,000	17	
7	"Task 7: Intimate Apparel & Boardroom"	31 May 2022	Tuesday 7:30 pm	411,000	12	
8	"Task 8: Clearance Sale & Boardroom"	1 June 2022	Wednesday 7:30 pm	415,000	14	
9	"Task 9: Children's Book & Boardroom"	5 June 2022	Sunday 7:00 pm	388,000	6	
10	"Task 10: Bucks & Hens' Night & Boardroom"	6 June 2022	Monday 7:30 pm	386,000	15	
11	"Task 11: Subway Marketing & Boardroom"	7 June 2022	Tuesday 7:30 pm	402,000	13	
12	"Task 12: Short-form Content & Boardroom"	13 June 2022	Monday 7:30 pm	423,000	16	
13	"Task 13: Pet Photography & Boardroom"	14 June 2022	Tuesday 7:30 pm	416,000	13	
14	"Task 14: Sharable Video & Boardroom"	15 June 2022	Wednesday 7:30 pm	439,000	13	
15	"Task 15: Life story & Boardroom"	20 June 2022	Monday 7:30 pm	455,000	14	
16	"Final Task Winner Announced"	21 June 2022	Tuesday 7:30 pm	459,000 594,000	11 6	
