= Daniel Rowland (runner) =

Zimbabwean long-distance trail runner (born 1984)

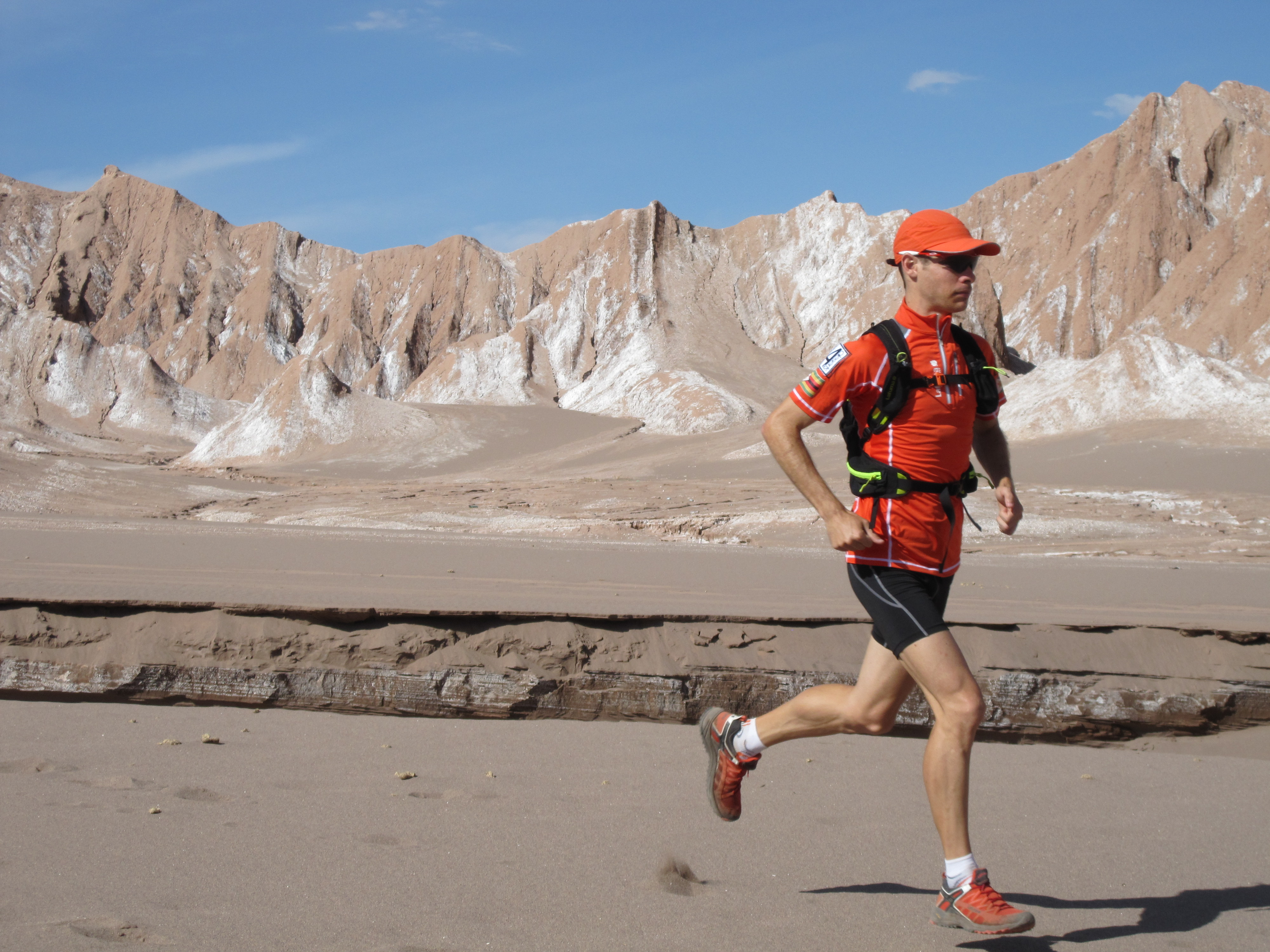
- Rowland training in the Atacama Desert before the Atacama Crossing 2013

Personal information
- Nationality: (Zimbabwe) Zimbabwean
- Born: Daniel Westcar Rowland; 3 May 1984 (age 42) Bulawayo, Zimbabwe
- Home town: Aubonne, Switzerland
- Education: University of Cape Town
- Height: 1.74 m (5 ft 9 in)
- Weight: 63 kg (139 lb)
- Website: dwrowland.com

Sport
- Country: Zimbabwe
- Sport: Trail running
- Race: Ultramarathon
- Turned pro: 2012

Achievements and titles
- World finals: Atacama Crossing 2013: 1st; KAEM 2013: 1st; Jungle Ultra 2014: 1st; Gran Trail Courmayeur 2019: 2nd; Cha Cha Cha Ultra Trail Verbier 2021: 1st
- Updated on 8 January 2016

Daniel Westcar Rowland (born 3 May 1984) is a Zimbabwean long-distance trail runner. He competes in ultra marathons and multi-day stage races around the world.

== Early life and education ==
Rowland was born in Bulawayo, Zimbabwe on 3 May 1984. He attended Whitestone School and Christian Brothers College, Bulawayo (St Patrick's). He studied Business Science at the University of Cape Town, graduating with First Class Honours in 2007. He worked for Anglo American plc in the finance division from 2008–2012. He became a full-time ultra runner in 2012. He lives in Blonay, Switzerland.

== Triathlon ==
Rowland started triathlon at an early age and won his first triathlon at the age of 11. From 1999–2001 he won the Junior National Zimbabwe Triathlon. He was elected to represent the Zimbabwe Junior Triathlon team in 2001, and in 2003 he was elected Captain of the National Team. He was awarded his Zimbabwe National colours in 2002 at the age of 18. In 2003 he was voted the best junior national triathlete at the National Triathlon Awards in Zimbabwe and he finished 5th in the All-Africa Games. During his time at the University of Cape Town, Rowland participated in the university Swimming Club and Athletics Club. He completed several triathlons during this time, and in 2007 he finished in 7th place in the Western Province Triathlon Championships in South Africa.

== Trail running ==
Rowland moved to Anchorage, Alaska in December 2009 and took up trail running in the mountains of the Alaska Range. His competed in his first trail race, the Crow Pass Crossing, in July 2010, finishing in 19th position in the men's division. Later that same year he completed his first two Ultra Marathons, The Bear Chase in Denver, Colorado in October where he took 28th position in the men's 20–29 division, and the Zombie Ultra Marathon in Anchorage, Alaska where he finished in 5th position overall. In February 2011 Rowland competed in his first 100-mile race, the Susitna 100: Race Across Frozen Alaska in Susitna, Alaska. He finished in 4th position in a time of 35:54:00.

Rowland moved to Santiago, Chile in April 2011 where he started to run more competitively. In September 2011 he finished 5th in the Salomon K42 trail race. A month later, in October 2011, he entered the Ultra Maraton de Los Andes in the 80 km division, but withdrew after 61 km due to a knee injury. In January 2012 Rowland ran a 70 km race from Licanray to Villarica in the south of Chile. He finished in 3rd place after defeating Argentinian athlete, Edgar Ezequiel Orozco, in a sprint finish. This was his first podium finish. In March 2012, Rowland competed in his first multi-day stage race, the RacingThePlanet 4 Deserts: Atacama Crossing. This race takes place in six stages over seven days and covers a distance of 250 km. Rowland finished in 9th place overall, winning his age group division of 20–29 years. He was the youngest finisher in the Top 10.

At the end of September 2012, Rowland quit his job with AngloAmerican and took up trail running full-time. He ran several more races towards the end of 2012, and in November he won his first trail race. The Ruta del Condor is a popular 50 km route from Cajón del Maipo to Santiago, Chile, and Rowland won in a time of 4h54min.

Rowland returned to the 4Deserts: Atacama Crossing race in March 2013. He won the first five stages of the race, and came fourth on the final stage, winning the event overall in a time of 26:17:51, nearly two hours faster than his first attempt.

Rowland's second major race of 2013 was the 250 km, multi-stage desert race, the Kalahari Augrabies Extreme Marathon in South Africa, which he won in a course-record time of 22:02:57. Rowland was joined in this race by his father and brother, who completed their first multi-stage race. His father, Jonathan Rowland, finished in 20th place in a time of 35:25:27, and his brother, Brian Rowland, finished 32nd in a time of 41:02:08.

Rowland's 2014 season started off with a podium finish when he took third place in his age group and in the overall race in the Columbia Trail Challenge in Olmué, Chile. In May, he travelled to Cusco, Peru for the Beyond the Ultimate Jungle Ultra, a race from the Andes to the Amazon. He won in a time of 27:01:20, winning the first four of five stages

Rowland moved to Switzerland in August 2014 to further his running career in Europe. He finished 5th in the 55 km Humani' Trail in Les Diablerets. He trains predominantly in the Vaud region in Switzerland, but regularly travels to the Swiss and French Alps for training and races.

In 2017 Rowland moved towards self-funding his running career. He became an ambassador for HRV4Training in 2019, as well as providing customer support for users of their app.

In July 2019, Rowland finished 2nd in the 105 km Gran Trail Courmayeur.

== Social Networking and Media ==
Rowland started a blog about his trail running in 2009. Initially his blog was called "Where a monkey needs a walking stick", a reference to a story his grandfather used to tell him about mountains that were so difficult to climb, that even a monkey needed a walking stick. In May 2012, Rowland removed that name from the blog and changed the web address to www.dwrowland.com. Rowland also has a Twitter account under the same name, @dwrowland. and an Instagram account under danielwrowland.

After his success in the Atacama Crossing 2013, Rowland participated in an interview with Ian Corless of Talk Ultra, in the Episode 7 podcast for ultra runners and enthusiasts South African-based "Trail" magazine did a six-page spread on Rowland's victory in the June–July–August 2013 edition, and the online trail magazine GoTrail Magazine also chronicled his achievement. Rowland featured in Episodes 7, 12 and 13 of the TrailTalkSA podcasts in 2013 talking about the preparations and achievements of his 2013 racing season.
