= 10,000 Miles =

2016 film

- Theatrical release poster
- Chinese: 一萬公里的約定
- Hanyu Pinyin: Yī wàn gōng lǐ de yuē dìng
- Hokkien POJ: Chi̍t-bān Kong-lí Ê Iok-tēng
- Directed by: Simon Hung
- Written by: Simon Hung; Ruby Chen
- Produced by: Peter Huang
- Starring: Sean Huang; Megan Lai; Darren Wang
- Cinematography: Hiroyuki Haga
- Edited by: Chris A. Peterson
- Music by: Josh Cruddas
- Production companies: Dream Started; Sun Entertainment Culture iQiyi Motion Pictures
- Distributed by: Vie Vision Pictures
- Release date: December 16, 2016
- Running time: 103 minutes
- Country: Taiwan
- Languages: Mandarin; English; Taiwanese
- Budget: NT$100 million
- Box office: NT$7.2 million (Taiwan)

10,000 Miles is a 2016 Taiwanese sports drama film directed by Simon Hung and starring Sean Huang, Megan Lai, and Darren Wang. The film is executive produced by Jay Chou and ultramarathon runner Kevin Lin.

== Cast ==
- Sean Huang as Kevin Fang
- Megan Lai as Ellie Chou Yi-ching
- Darren Wang as Sean Fang
- Jack Noseworthy as Charlie
- Fan Kuang-yao as The coach who can't stop chewing gum
- Lung Shao-hua as Kevin and Sean's father
- Ken Lo as Evil doctor
- Weng Ning-qian as Evil doctor's assistant
- Liao Chun as Shop owner
- Peng Peng as Shop owner's wife
- Chien Li-wen as Nicole
- Lele as Minnie
- Chris Lee as Ellie's boyfriend
- Hsu Li-yun as Orphanage matron
- Kuo Chih-chia as Kevin Fang (childhood)
- Shen Chang-hung as Sean Fang (childhood)
- Peter Huang as Taxi passenger
- Jay Chou as himself (cameo)
- Wang Tao-nan as Nicole's father
- Chiang Shao-yi as Nicole's mother
- Liya Wang as Female runner

== Soundtrack ==
=== Featured songs ===
No.	Title	Writer(s)	Performer	Length
1.	"Dream 夢想啟動"	Kevin Lin	Jay Chou	3:25
2.	"Snail 蝸牛"	Jay Chou	Jay Chou	5:11
