= Ray Zahab =

Raymond Zahab
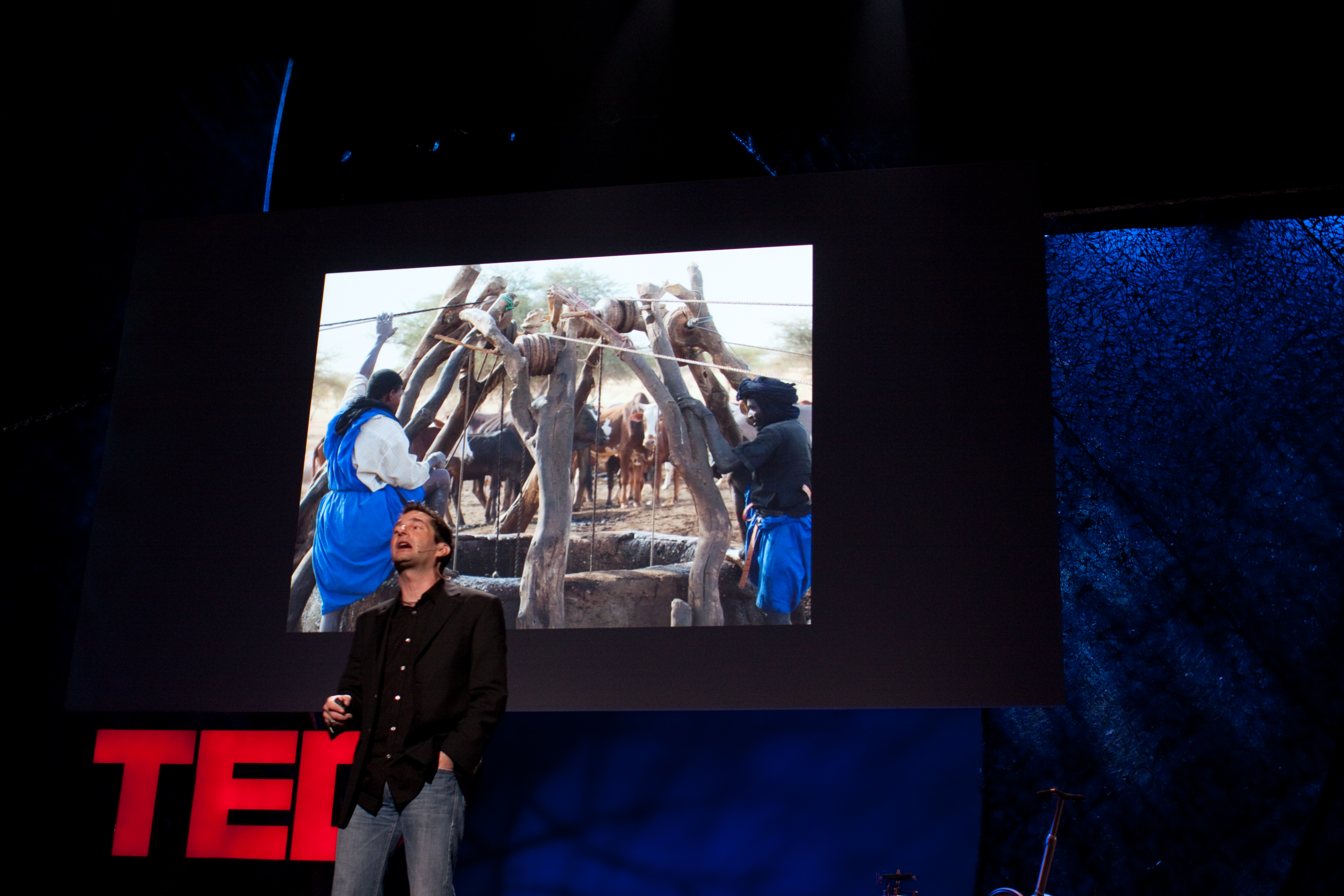
- Zahab speaking at TED in 2009. Photograph by Bill Holsinger-Robinson.
- Born: 1968 or 1969 (age 56–57)
- Known for: long-distance runner, public speaker

Raymond Zahab, MSC (born in 1969) is a Canadian long-distance runner and public speaker. He has run in long-distance running adventures in several countries, including the South Pole, Siberia, and the Atacama Desert in Chile. He crossed the Sahara with Charlie Engle, (USA) and Kevin Lin (Taiwan).

Zahab starred in the 2007 documentary film "Running the Sahara" narrated and produced by Matt Damon and directed by Oscar-winner James Moll, which follows three men as they run across the Sahara Desert, a journey of 111 days and more than 4,300 miles of challenging terrain.

Zahab is also the author of the autobiography Running for My Life: On the Extreme Road with Adventure Runner Ray Zahab (ISBN 978-1-897178-44-7), and co-author with Steve Pitt of Running to Extremes: Ray Zahab's Amazing Ultra marathon Journey (ISBN 978-0143179672). and co author with Eric Walters of Just Deserts.

In 2024, Zahab was inducted in the Chelsea Wall of Fame alongside fighter Dave Leduc and cyclist Michael Woods, in a permanent display at the Meredith Centre in Chelsea, Quebec.

== Results ==
Gobi March Team 2006 — 1st
Sahara Race 2005 — 1st
Libyan Challenge 2006 — 1st
BadWater Ultra — DNF
Marathon des Sables 2005 — 24th
Trans333 2004 — 3rd
Jungle Marathon Solo 2004 — 8th
Jungle Marathon Team 2004 — 1st
Marathon des Sables 2004 — 47th
Yukon Arctic Ultra 2004 — 1st

== Honours ==
In 2015, he was awarded the Meritorious Service Cross.
