= Desert Runners =

- Film poster
- Directed by: Jennifer Steinman
- Produced by: Jennifer Steinman; Diana Iles Parker; Yael Melamede
- Cinematography: Sevan Matossian
- Edited by: Jennifer Steinman
- Music by: Eric Holland
- Release dates: June 20, 2013 (EIFF); November 29, 2013 (United States)
- Running time: 91 minutes
- Country: United States
- Language: English

Desert Runners is a 2013 American documentary film directed by Jennifer Steinman that follows a group of non-professional runners that attempt to complete 4 Deserts, a series of ultramarathon races often considered the most difficult in the world. Their journeys take them through some of the world’s most beautiful places while pushing the limits of their minds and bodies. It provides a look into the mindset of endurance athletes, and the ways in which humans deal with both heartbreak and achievement.

== Development ==
Director Jennifer Steinman became interested in creating a film about the 4 Deserts series after meeting one of the participants at a nutrition conference. Originally it was to focus on just one athlete, but expanded to four just before the first race when Steinman decided she wanted to add more storylines. Filming for Desert Runners began in the Atacama Desert and continued through the four stages of 4 Deserts in 2010. From October 8 through November 8, 2011, the producers used the crowdfunding website Kickstarter to help finance the final portion of the film project. In 30 days they reached their goal of $25,000. With more than 80 hours of footage, the editors began putting the 90-minute film together in late 2011.

== Release ==
The film made its world premiere at the Edinburgh International Film Festival in June 2013, its US premiere at the Mill Valley Film Festival in October 2013, and its theatrical premiere in the US on November 29, 2013.

On November 21, 2013, Desert Runners made its television debut on DirecTV's Audience Network.

The film is currently available on DVD and as a digital download.

== Reception ==
=== Critical response ===
Desert Runners has received mostly positive reviews from movie critics. Dennis Harvey from Variety states: "despite the sometimes excruciating, arguably foolhardy nature of these races...there’s an upbeat tenor to “Desert Runners” that develops real rooting value for the protags. The frequently spectacular surroundings don’t hurt, of course, and the pic is nicely turned in all tech departments." Mike Williams of Yahoo! Movies claims: "'Desert Runners' is an eye-opening piece of documentary making. It'll leave you broken by the end of it because you really feel the pain and limits each competitor pushes his or herself to. It's a bonding process, both for Steinman as a filmmaker, but more significant is the connection between the audience and those featured that cements a strong and genuine adoration and concern. Inspiring." In Lee Stobbs of GQ's review, he says "You are hooked from the first minute to the 95th..and by the end feeling almost as exhausted."

The film was selected for the Edinburgh International Film Festival's "Best of the Fest" encore screenings, which took place on June 30, 2013 and featured films which had the most positive reaction from the festival's audience.

=== Accolades ===
Award	Date of ceremony	Category	Recipients and nominees	Outcome
Vancouver International Film Festival	October 12, 2013	Most Popular International Documentary Film		Won
Hamptons International Film Festival	October 14, 2013	Audience Award for Best Documentary Feature		Won
