= Rainbow, California =

- Census designated place
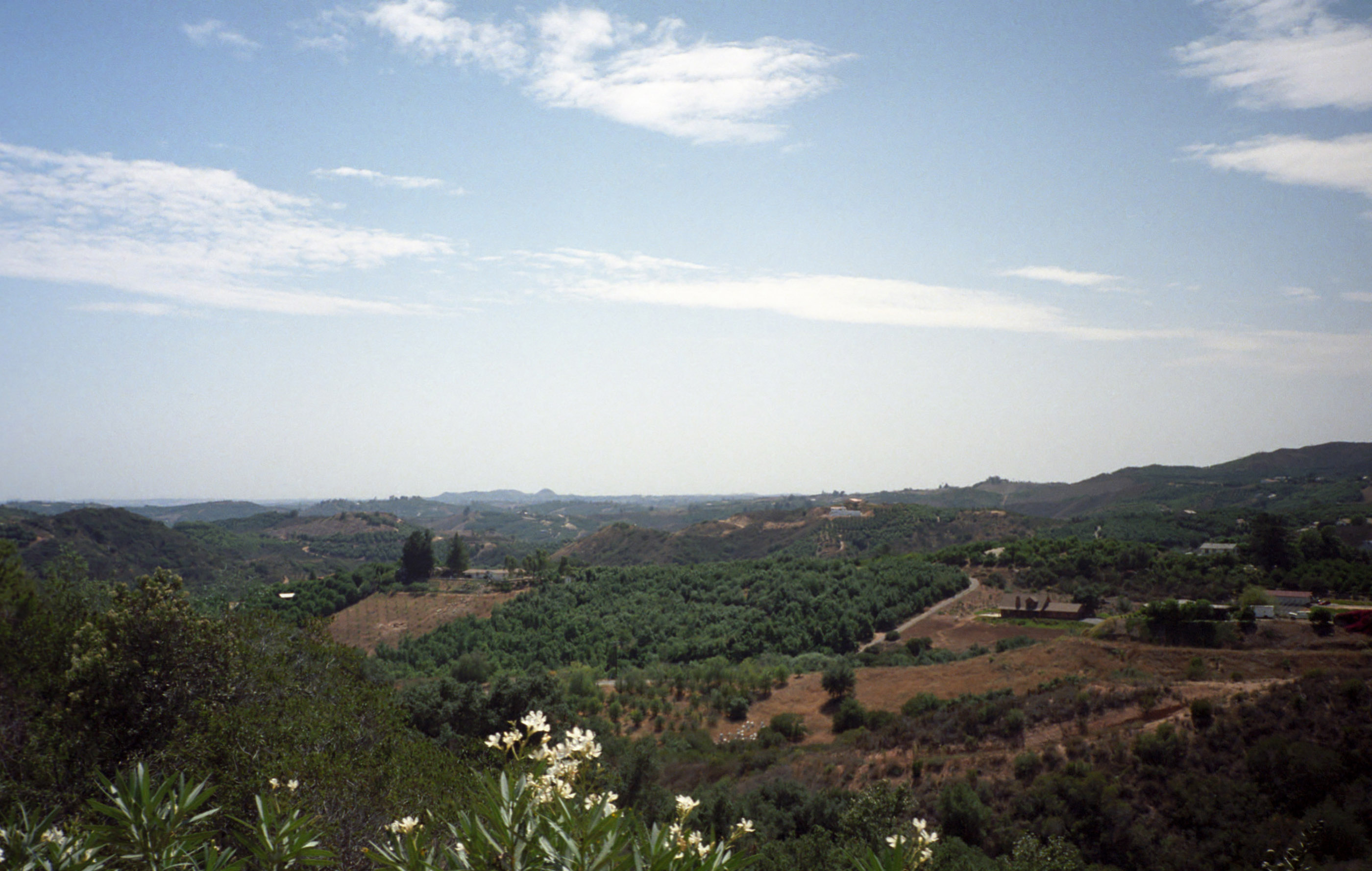
- Rainbow

- Location in San Diego County and the state of California

- Location in the United States
- Coordinates: 33°24′40″N 117°8′57″W
- Country: United States
- State: California
- County: San Diego

Area
  - Total: 11.043 sq mi (28.601 km^{2})
  - Land: 11.043 sq mi (28.601 km^{2})
  - Water: 0 sq mi (0 km^{2}) 0%
- Elevation: 1,043 ft (318 m)

Population (2020)
  - Total: 1,884
  - Density: 170.6/sq mi (65.87/km^{2})
- Time zone: UTC-8 (Pacific)
  - Summer (DST): UTC-7 (PDT)
- ZIP code: 92028
- Area codes: 442/760
- FIPS code: 06-59248
- GNIS feature IDs: 1652780, 2409123

Rainbow is a census-designated place (CDP) in northern San Diego County, California. The population was 1,884 at the 2020 census, up from 1,832 at the 2010 census.

== History ==
The area, previously known as "Vallecitos" (little valleys), was renamed "Rainbow Valley" in the late 1880s, after Mr. James Peebles Marshall Rainbow, who bought a homestead there.

In October 2007, the Santa Ana winds fueled a major wildfire in the area.

The town has many palm tree farms, and is a gateway to the city of Temecula.

== Geography ==
According to the United States Census Bureau, the CDP has a total area of 11.0 square miles (28 km^{2}), all land.

At the 2000 U.S. census, the CDP had a total area of 16.1 square miles (42 km^{2}), all land.

=== Climate ===
According to the Köppen climate classification system, Rainbow has a warm-summer Mediterranean climate, abbreviated "Csa" on climate maps.

== Demographics ==
Historical population
Census	Pop.	Note	%±
1980	1,092		—
1990	2,006		83.7%
2000	2,026		1.0%
2010	1,832		−9.6%
2020	1,884		2.8%
U.S. Decennial Census; 1860–1870 1880-1890; 1900 1910 1920; 1930 1940 1950; 1960 1970 1980; 1990 2000 2010; 2020

Rainbow was first listed as a census designated place in the 1980 U.S. census.

=== Racial and ethnic composition ===
Rainbow CDP, California – Racial and ethnic composition Note: the US Census treats Hispanic/Latino as an ethnic category. This table excludes Latinos from the racial categories and assigns them to a separate category. Hispanics/Latinos may be of any race.
Race / Ethnicity (NH = Non-Hispanic)	Pop 2000	Pop 2010	Pop 2020	% 2000	% 2010	% 2020
White alone (NH)	1,463	1,062	986	72.21%	57.97%	52.34%
Black or African American alone (NH)	3	18	17	0.15%	0.98%	0.90%
Native American or Alaska Native alone (NH)	14	8	7	0.69%	0.44%	0.37%
Asian alone (NH)	49	43	71	2.42%	2.35%	3.77%
Native Hawaiian or Pacific Islander alone (NH)	16	11	0	0.79%	0.60%	0.00%
Other race alone (NH)	6	0	12	0.30%	0.00%	0.64%
Mixed race or Multiracial (NH)	33	25	74	1.63%	1.36%	3.93%
Hispanic or Latino (any race)	442	665	717	21.82%	36.30%	38.06%
Total	2,026	1,832	1,884	100.00%	100.00%	100.00%

=== 2020 census ===
As of the 2020 census, Rainbow had a population of 1,884. The population density was 170.6 inhabitants per square mile (65.9/km^{2}).

The age distribution was 327 people (17.4%) under the age of 18, 143 people (7.6%) aged 18 to 24, 450 people (23.9%) aged 25 to 44, 485 people (25.7%) aged 45 to 64, and 479 people (25.4%) who were 65 years of age or older. The median age was 46.4 years. For every 100 females, there were 96.2 males, and for every 100 females age 18 and over, there were 94.9 males.

The census reported that 1,809 people (96.0% of the population) lived in households and 75 (4.0%) were institutionalized. There were 651 households, out of which 167 (25.7%) had children under the age of 18 living in them, 352 (54.1%) were married-couple households, 40 (6.1%) were cohabiting couple households, 132 (20.3%) had a female householder with no partner present, and 127 (19.5%) had a male householder with no partner present. 150 households (23.0%) were one person, and 76 (11.7%) were one person aged 65 or older. The average household size was 2.78. There were 452 families (69.4% of all households).

There were 701 housing units at an average density of 63.5 units per square mile (24.5 units/km^{2}), of which 651 (92.9%) were occupied. Of these, 485 (74.5%) were owner-occupied, and 166 (25.5%) were occupied by renters. The homeowner vacancy rate was 0.8%, and the rental vacancy rate was 6.6%.

0.0% of residents lived in urban areas, while 100.0% lived in rural areas.

=== Income and poverty ===
In 2023, the US Census Bureau estimated that the median household income was $85,368, and the per capita income was $42,819. About 4.0% of families and 8.6% of the population were below the poverty line.

=== 2010 ===
At the 2010 census Rainbow had a population of 1,832. The population density was 165.9 inhabitants per square mile (64.1/km^{2}). The racial makeup of Rainbow was 1,324 (72.3%) White, 19 (1.0%) African American, 12 (0.7%) Native American, 43 (2.3%) Asian, 12 (0.7%) Pacific Islander, 371 (20.3%) from other races, and 51 (2.8%) from two or more races. Hispanic or Latino of any race were 665 people (36.3%).

The census reported that 1,745 people (95.3% of the population) lived in households, no one lived in non-institutionalized group quarters and 87 (4.7%) were institutionalized.

There were 644 households, 173 (26.9%) had children under the age of 18 living in them, 375 (58.2%) were opposite-sex married couples living together, 39 (6.1%) had a female householder with no husband present, 26 (4.0%) had a male householder with no wife present. There were 26 (4.0%) unmarried opposite-sex partnerships, and 5 (0.8%) same-sex married couples or partnerships. 163 households (25.3%) were one person and 81 (12.6%) had someone living alone who was 65 or older. The average household size was 2.71. There were 440 families (68.3% of households); the average family size was 3.20.

The age distribution was 343 people (18.7%) under the age of 18, 153 people (8.4%) aged 18 to 24, 412 people (22.5%) aged 25 to 44, 555 people (30.3%) aged 45 to 64, and 369 people (20.1%) who were 65 or older. The median age was 45.3 years. For every 100 females, there were 97.2 males. For every 100 females age 18 and over, there were 96.7 males.

There were 719 housing units at an average density of 65.1 per square mile, of the occupied units 475 (73.8%) were owner-occupied and 169 (26.2%) were rented. The homeowner vacancy rate was 2.6%; the rental vacancy rate was 6.1%. 1,230 people (67.1% of the population) lived in owner-occupied housing units and 515 people (28.1%) lived in rental housing units.

== Government ==
In the California State Legislature, Rainbow is in the 40th senatorial district, represented by Republican Brian Jones, and in the 75th Assembly district, represented by Republican Carl DeMaio.

In the United States House of Representatives, Rainbow is in California's 48th congressional district, represented by Republican Darrell Issa.
