= Ulladulla High School =

Location
- Ulladulla, South Coast, New South Wales; Australia; 35°21′S 150°28′E

Information
- Former name: Milton Central School
- Type: Government-funded co-educational comprehensive secondary day school
- Motto: Strive for the Summit
- Established: 1974; 52 years ago
- School district: South Coast; Regional South
- Educational authority: NSW Department of Education
- Principal: Denise Lofts 2013-present
- Teaching staff: 91.1 FTE (2018)
- Years: 7–12
- Age range: 12–18
- Enrolment: 1,159 (2025)
- Language: English, French, Japanese
- Campus: 7 hectares (16.4 acres)
- Colours: Dark green and white
- Website: ulladulla-h.schools.nsw.gov.au

Ulladulla High School is a government-funded co-educational comprehensive secondary day school, located in the town of Ulladulla on the south-east coast of New South Wales, Australia.

Established in 1974, the school enrolled approximately 1,200 students in 2018, from Year 7 to Year 12, of whom seven percent identified as Indigenous Australians and seven percent were from a language background other than English. The school is operated by the NSW Department of Education; the principal is Denise Lofts.

== Principals ==
Ordinal	Officeholder	Term start	Term end	Time in office	Notes
1	Robin Cantrill	1989	1991	1–2 years	
2	Paul Connor	1992	2002	10 years	
3	Tracy Provest	2003	2012	9–10 years	
4	Denise Lofts	2013	incumbent	10 years	

== Controversies ==
In 2011 Ulladulla High School faced criticism over its management of Special Religious Education. The then principal, Tracy Provest, was criticised by some parents for requiring non-religious students to attend scripture lessons to acquire 'non-scripture' notes, and providing minimal supervision for those 'opting out'.

In 2009, Ulladulla High School was featured in the media for allowing the Christian-affiliated Organisation, Choices, Decisions, Outcomes to provide sex education classes to students.

In 2006, the Principal, Tracy Provest, allowed students to be breathalysed at school socials, despite this being against Departmental guidelines.

== Notable alumni ==
- Turia Pitt – Australian athlete, Ironman Triathlon contestant, 2014 NSW Premier's Award for Woman of the Year recipient, Young Australian of the Year finalist 2014/2016, motivational speaker and author
- Matt Best – drummer in the band Tonight Alive signed to both Fearless Records and Sony Music Entertainment Australia
- Luke O'Donnell – former professional rugby league footballer
- Gary Warburton – professional rugby league player with the Canterbury-Bankstown Bulldogs

== Notable staff ==
- Jihad Dib – former teacher who later became a Labor minister in the Minns Government.

== See also ==
- List of government schools in New South Wales: G–P
- List of schools in Illawarra and the South East
- Education in Australia
