= Rainbow Valley (Chile) =

Colorful landform in Chile

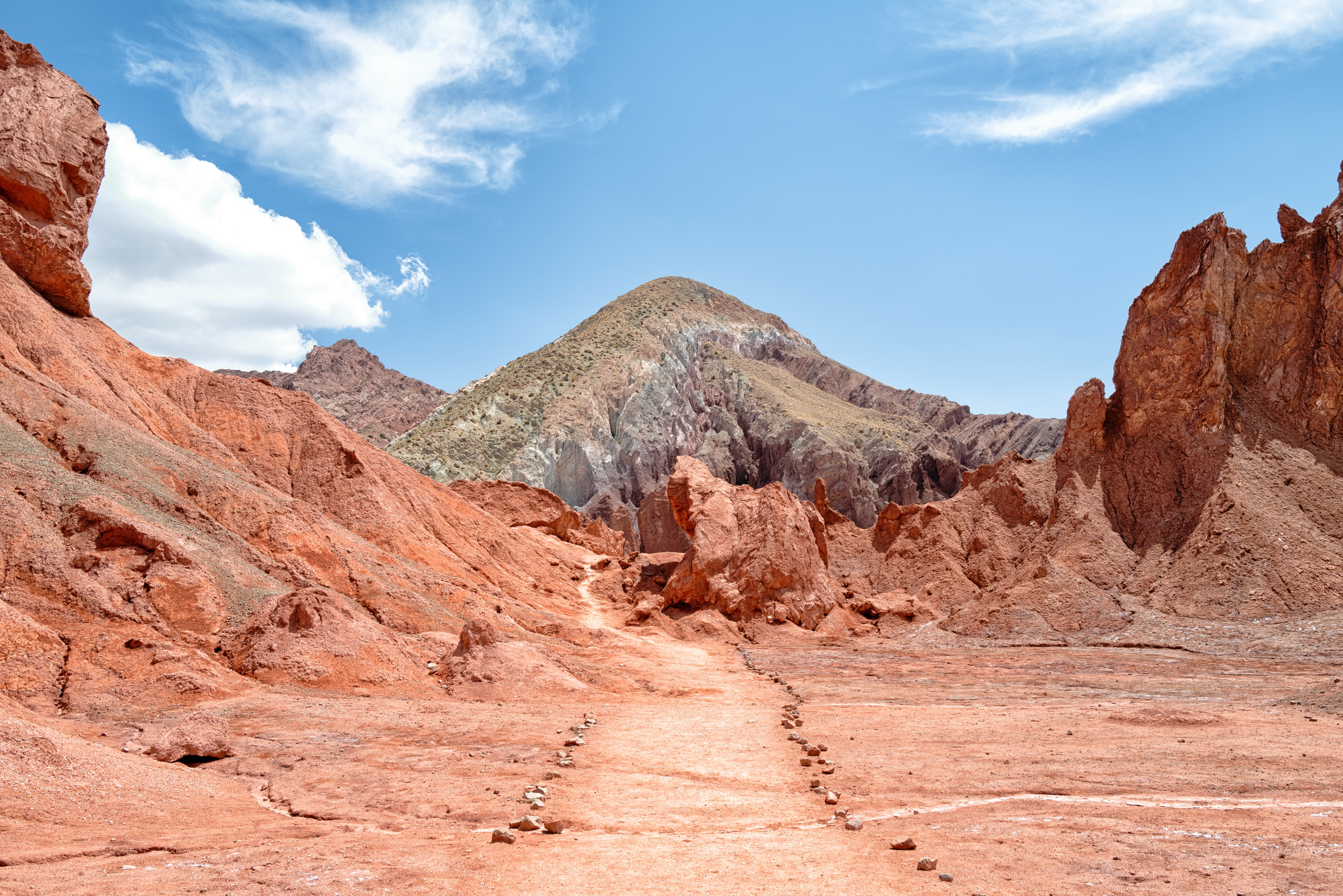
- Rainbow Valley vista

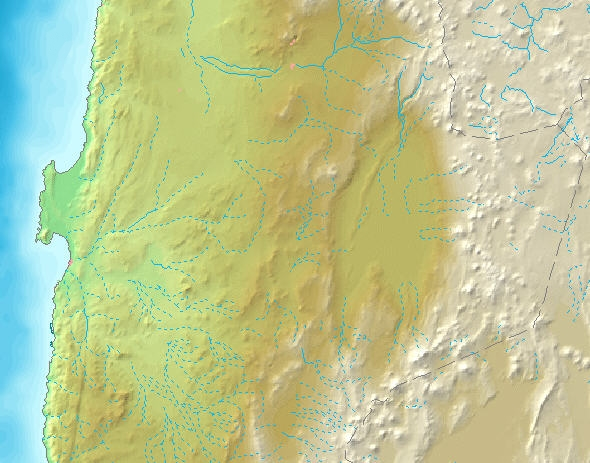
- Location within Región de Antofagasta
- Floor elevation: 3,200 m (10,500 ft)

Naming
- Native name: Valle del Arcoíris (Spanish); Chuschul (Kunza); Lari (Kunza)

Geography
- Location: Antofagasta, Chile
- Country: Chile
- State/Province: Antofagasta
- Coordinates: 22.64°S 67.73°W
- Interactive map of Rainbow Valley

Rainbow Valley (Valle del Arcoíris) is a dry ravine in the Cordillera Domeyko mountain range known for its variety of rock colors and dramatic rock shapes. It is 90 kilometers north of San Pedro de Atacama and just north of the Yerbas Buenas Petroglyphs. It is more than three kilometers above sea level.

== Geology ==
Rainbow Valley is a ravine that empties into the Salado River.

The rocks of the valley walls feature distinct contrasts in color. At the bottom are layers of iron-rich red ochre clay deposited by the eruption of the volcanoes that formed the Chilean Coast Range. On top of that are layers of rock salt, gypsum, and calcite deposited by the Salar de Atacama. Emerging between them are rises of rocks formed from cooled magma that contain iron and magnesium that bonded with other elements and became green through oxidation. Other minerals like cobalt and lamprophyre give the valley other unusual colors like yellow, blue, pink, and purple. Millions of years of erosion have since carved the valley into its current shape.

Due to a lack of valuable minerals such as lithium and copper common elsewhere in the region, Rainbow Valley has remained untouched by mining, remaining in its pristine, eroded state.

== History ==
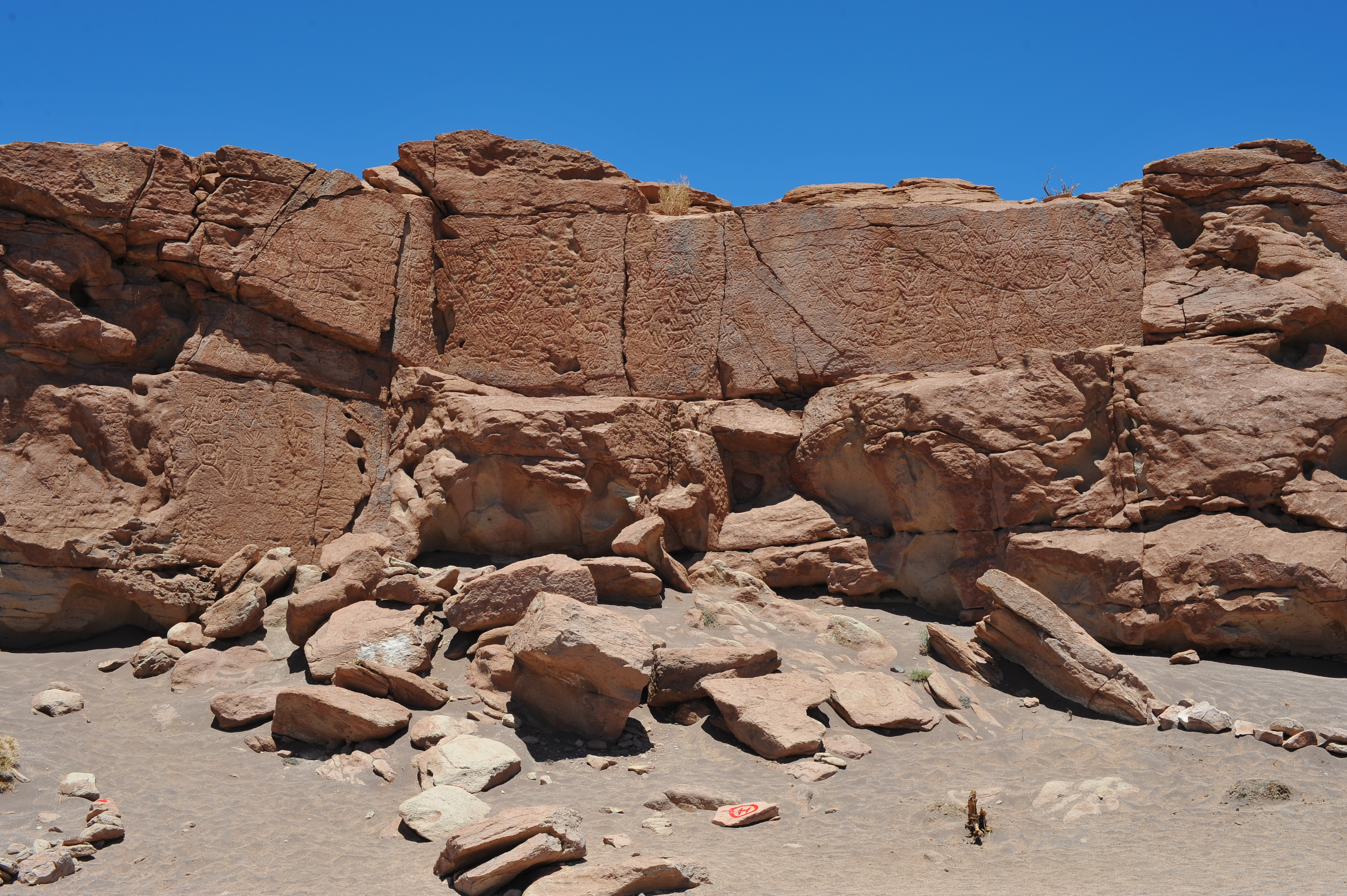
Petroglyphs at Rainbow Valley near the visitor center

Rainbow Valley has been home to people since ancient times, and is the site of several petroglyphs. Prior to the Spanish colonization of the Americas, the area was, and still is, home to Atacama people who grazed livestock including llamas in the area.

Since then, an Atacameño entrepreneur popularized the name "Valle del Arcoíris" to bring in tourism, and the economy has since shifted to cater to that industry. Guided tours are offered starting in San Pedro de Atacama.

Rainbow Valley was the starting location of the 4 Deserts Atacama Crossing 2025 race.

== Ecosystem ==
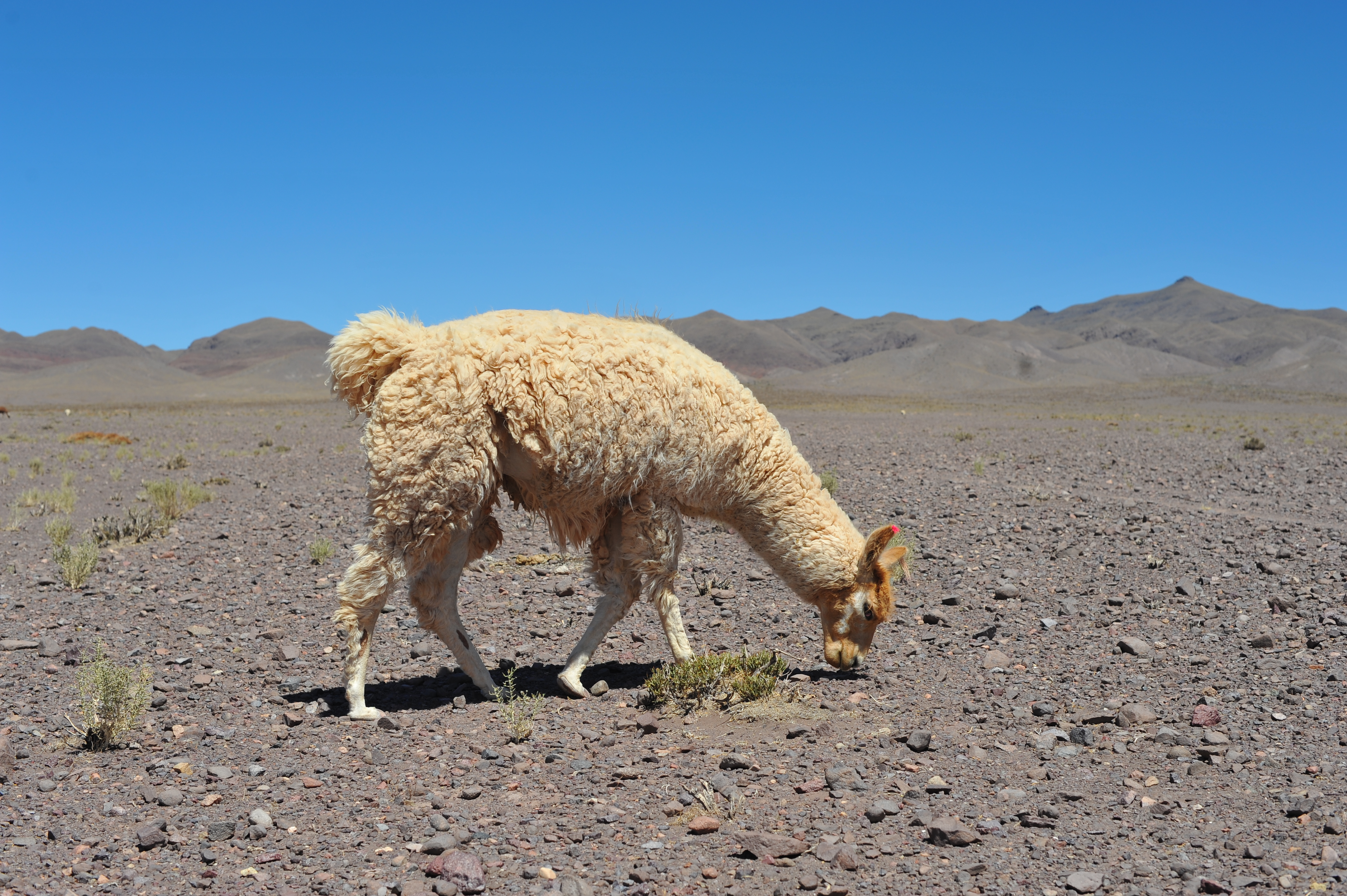
Llama grazing in Rainbow Valley

Rainbow Valley has an arid climate, and the flora and fauna that live here are adapted for the dry conditions. Species of cactus are found here, as are lizards and birds.

== See also ==
- Vinicunca
- Atacama Desert
