= RacingThePlanet =

Company

RacingThePlanet Limited
- Type: Privately held
- Industry: Sport events, outdoor gear retail
- Founded: (2002; 24 years ago) at Hong Kong
- Founder: Mary K Gadams
- Headquarters: Hong Kong
- Area served: Global
- Key people: Mary K Gadams, CEO; Samantha Fanshawe, President of Events; Riitta Hanninen, Head of Events; Zeana Haroun, Event Manager
- Products: RacingThePlanet, 4 Deserts, The Outdoor Store
- Divisions: RacingThePlanet, The Outdoor Store
- Website: www.racingtheplanet.com

RacingThePlanet (RTP) is an organizer of off-trail and rough-country endurance foot-races, including the 4 Deserts. The company also operates an outdoor products store and a dried foods company.

The 2011 Kimberley Ultramarathon was the subject of a parliamentary inquiry in Western Australia after a number of competitors suffered life-threatening burns when a bushfire overran a part of the route. 60 Minutes Australia documented the journey of one of the contestants burned by bushfire.

As they limp out of Petra's ancient narrow passage, two of the 131 proud runners/hikers from 38 countries are timed on completing their 2012 250km Wadi Rum to Petra race in Jordan. They had raced through canyons and over sand dunes, carrying their own food.

Race-end celebration in Petra, carved in a rocky canyon — for some 7000 years the major regional trading hub between Africa and the Middle East.

== History ==
=== 2002–2008 ===
In 2002, RacingThePlanet is founded.

In 2003, the first race of the 4 Deserts Ultramarathon Series takes place in Dunhuang China: the Gobi March (China).

In 2004, the inaugural Atacama Crossing takes place in Chile.

In 2005, the inaugural Sahara Race takes place in Egypt.

In 2006, The Last Desert (Antarctica) takes place. Kevin Lin from Taiwan and Lisanne Dorion from USA are named the first 4 Deserts Champions.

In 2007, RacingThePlanet became a case study for the Harvard Business School and is one of the few case studies to be repeated yearly.

=== 2008–2009 ===
In 2009 RacingThePlanet launched an online retail store specializing in selling the outdoor apparel, equipment and nutritional products required for endurance racing. By 2010 the store had grown to stock a much larger variety of products for all Outdoors pursuits. Later in the year, The Outdoor Store became the largest online outdoor gear store in Asia and had distribution hubs in Hong Kong and the United Kingdom allowing global distribution.

In 2008, Dean Karnazes from USA and Laura Corti from Italy are named the 4 Deserts Champions.

In 2008 & 2009, 4 Deserts Ultramarathon Series is ranked #2 on the TIME Magazine's list of the World's Top Endurance Events.

=== 2010–2011 ===
In 2010 a record nine competitors completed the 4 Deserts Grand Slam, including three women who are the first to have achieved the feat - Samantha Gash of Australia, Lucy Rivers-Bulkeley and Linda Quirk.

A Shanghai-based competitor died of heatstroke after competing in the 2010 Gobi March. His brother claimed Racing the Planet was "reckless" and ill-prepared.

The year 2010 also saw the first 100 km race organised by the company - the which took place in the desert around Hotan in China's western Xinjiang Province.

In 2010 Ryan Sandes of South Africa was crowned 4 Deserts Champion having won all four of the races he competed in, and Marjiana Pellizer of Croatia was crowned women's champion.

On 2 September 2011, at the 100 km event in the Kimberly, Western Australia, Turia Pitt, 24, and Kate Sanderson, 35, were left with severe burn injuries when fire swept through a rocky gorge during the outback race. Two men - Michael Hull and Martin van der Merwe - suffered less serious burns. RacingThePlanet has not compensated the victims or contributed to their medical treatment, including to Ms Pitt whose expenses exceed $2 million. In November 2012, the Government of Western Australia made ex gratia payments of $450,000 to each of the women.

Originally launched in English, in 2011 the Outdoor Store expanded capability to include Traditional and Simplified Chinese, as well as French, Spanish and Italian.

=== 2012–2015 ===
In 2012, Vicente Juan Garcia from Spain and Anne-Marie Flammersfeld from Germany become the first two, in a calendar year, to win all 4 Deserts Ultramarthons and achieve the 4 Deserts Grand Slam.

In the same year, RacingThePlanet partnered with The Esquel Group to fund nine (9) scholarships to send minority girls in the Gobi Desert to high school and university/technical schools.

In 2013, the film Desert Runners, shot at all 4 Deserts, and made its world premiere at the Edinburgh International Film Festival in June 2013, and later on Netflix.

In 2014, "Chema" Martinez Fernandez & Isis Breiter, a double Olympian and a mother-of-three, respectively, are named 4 Deserts Champions 2014.

In 2015, The Sahara Race is temporarily relocated to Jordan from Egypt and at the first-ever female Afghan ultramarathon team to join the Gobi March.

=== 2016–2020 ===
In June 2016, the 50th 4 Deserts/Roving Race took place at the Gobi March (China). In addition, the Sahara Race is relocated to Namibia, where it currently remains and has been renamed to the Namib Race.

In June 2016, "Gobi the Dog" follows runners and is first adopted by Medlina Helil before becoming famous.

At the conclusion of 2016, Jax Mariash & Chen Yen-Po are named the 4 Deserts Champions & Cynthia Fish & Jax Mariash become the first females to complete the 4 Deserts Grand Slam Plus.

In 2018, the Gobi March is relocated to Mongolia where it currently remains. In addition, Isabelle Sauve & Wong Ho Chung are named the 4 Deserts Champions 2018 and Fung Kam Hung becomes the first amputee to join the 4 Deserts Club.

In 2020, the global pandemic (COVID19) postpones all races until 2021.

== List of events ==
RacingThePlanet has organised 65 races at the beginning of 2020. The events are in three categories, with all sharing most characteristics which are that:

- Races are held in remote but historically or culturally rich areas.
- Races are mostly through wilderness areas, across varied terrain, mostly off-trail.
- Competitors race self-supporting, carrying all their own food, fluids and equipment.
- The number of competitors in each race is limited, to minimise environmental damage.
- Competitors do not feel that they are part of a large group — they can enjoy solitude.
- There are no race prizes, but those who successfully complete a race are presented with a medal at the finish line.

The current categories of races include:

- 4 Deserts Ultramarathon Series
- RacingThePlanet Ultramarathon
- 100 km Races

Year	4 Deserts Ultramarathon Series	RacingThePlanet Ultramarathon	100 km Races
2003	Gobi March (China)		
2004	Atacama Crossing (Chile)		
2005	Gobi March (China), Sahara Race (Egypt)		
2006	Gobi March (China), Sahara Race (Egypt), Atacama Crossing (Chile), The Last Desert (Antarctica)		
2007	Gobi March (China), Sahara Race (Egypt), Atacama Crossing (Chile), The Last Desert (Antarctica)		
2008	Gobi March (China), Sahara Race (Egypt), Atacama Crossing (Chile), The Last Desert (Antarctica)	RacingThePlanet: Vietnam	
2009	Gobi March (China), Sahara Race (Egypt), Atacama Crossing (Chile)	RacingThePlanet: Namibia	
2010	Gobi March (China), Sahara Race (Egypt), Atacama Crossing (Chile), The Last Desert (Antarctica)	RacingThePlanet: Australia	RacingThePlanet100: Taklamakan (China) Ultramarathon
2011	Gobi March (China), Sahara Race (Egypt), Atacama Crossing (Chile)	RacingThePlanet: Nepal	RacingThePlanet100: Kimberley Ultramarathon
2012	Gobi March (China), Sahara Race (Egypt), Atacama Crossing (Chile), The Last Desert (Antarctica)	RacingThePlanet: Jordan	
2013	Gobi March (China), Atacama Crossing (Chile)	RacingThePlanet: Iceland	
2014	Gobi March (China), Atacama Crossing (Chile), Sahara Race (Jordan), The Last Desert (Antarctica)	RacingThePlanet: Madagascar	
2015	Gobi March (China), Atacama Crossing (Chile)	RacingThePlanet: Ecuador	
2016	Gobi March (China), Sahara Race (Namibia), Atacama Crossing (Chile), The Last Desert (Antarctica)	RacingThePlanet: Sri Lanka	
2017	Gobi March (China), Sahara Race (Namibia), Atacama Crossing (Chile)	RacingThePlanet: Patagonia, Argentina	
2018	Gobi March (Mongolia), Namib Race (Namibia), Atacama Crossing (Chile), The Last Desert (Antarctica)		
2019	Gobi March (Mongolia), Namib Race (Namibia), Atacama Crossing (Chile)	RacingThePlanet: New Zealand	

== Merchandise ==
Since 2004, RacingThePlanet has developed a number of their own products and merchandise for use in endurance racing. In 2009, it launched an online retail store, The Outdoor Store, which sells equipment, clothing, footwear and nutrition products for the sport.

== Corporate information ==
The CEO is Mary K Gadams, who is also the company's founder. RacingThePlanet is headquartered in Hong Kong where they also have a showroom for The Outdoor Store. There is a second distribution centre and office in Yorkshire in the United Kingdom, which also has a showroom.

There are 16 country managers who represent the company in Belgium, Brazil, Chile, China, Denmark, France, Germany, India, Italy, Japan, Korea, Malaysia, Mexico, South Africa, Taiwan and Spain.

== Charitable causes ==
About half of the competitors at RacingThePlanet events are supporting charitable causes through their participation. RacingThePlanet puts no limits on the type of causes that are supported.

Because of the remote locations of many of the races RacingThePlanet choose to support a specific charity at almost every event, that provides support to the local community in which the event takes place. The company has a long-running partnership with Operation Smile, and has raised over US$500,000 for the charity for projects in Vietnam, China and Egypt, often funding missions and surgeries in the local communities through which competitors race.

The company has donated books and sports equipments to schools in Xinjiang province where the Gobi March is held through the Esquel Y. L. Yang Education Fund who they have also supported for a number of years.

In 2008, the Gobi March took place just one month after the devastating earthquake in Sichuan Province on 12 May, so that year RacingThePlanet put together a special auction in which friends and families of competitors could bid to buy a hot shower for three competitors at the end of the 90 km Stage 5 of the event. The auction raised almost US$30,000 for the Red Cross disaster fund.

Again in 2010 another earthquake affected a country that plays host to a 4 Deserts race. The Chilean earthquake of 27 February occurred just one week before the start of the Atacama Crossing. RacingThePlanet and the community of competitors and friends raised US$15,000 for Habitat for Humanity in the weeks to follow.

== RacingThePlanet Ultramarathon ==
=== 4 Deserts Ultramarathon Series ===
The 4 Deserts Ultramarathon Series was recognized by Time magazine in 2009 and 2010 as the world's leading series of rough-country endurance footraces. The 250-kilometre (160 mi) races take place over 7 days and 6 stages. A campsite is raised each night for competitors where they are provided with a place in a tent to sleep, access to hot water, a campfire, medical assistance and the "CyberTent" where they can view and send messages to family and friends and update their race blog. Competitors race from campsite to campsite each day through a series of checkpoints where they collect drinking water and can seek medical treatment.

The results of the race are based on the cumulative time taken for the competitor to complete all the stages, and a competitor must successfully pass through every checkpoint in order to collect a finisher's medal.

The 4 Deserts Ultramarathon Series comprises the Atacama Crossing (Chile), the Gobi March (Mongolia) (held in China until 2018), the Namib Race (Namibia) (previously the Sahara Race (Egypt and Jordan)) and The Last Desert (Antarctica). If a competitor completes the series they gain membership to the 4 Deserts Club. There are currently 165 members of the 4 Deserts Club. The man and woman with the cumulative highest ranks across the four races at the finish line of each edition of The Last Desert (Antarctica) is crowned the 4 Deserts Champion.

A new phenomenon was started by competitors in 2008 now called the 4 Deserts Grand Slam. This refers to competitors attempting to complete all four of the races in a calendar year. Seventy-eight competitors have so far managed to complete the 4 Deserts Grand Slam.

In addition, beginning in 2010, the 4 Deserts Grand Slam Plus was instigated. This refers to competitors attempting to complete the 4 Deserts Ultramarathon Series and the RacingThePlanet Ultramarathon in one calendar year. As of 18 January 2021, only eight competitors have managed to achieve this.

=== RacingThePlanet Ultramarathon ===
The annual roving race is called the RacingThePlanet Ultramrathon. It follows the same format as the 4 Deserts events, but moves to a different location every year. Spaniard Salvador Calvo Redondo has set a record by winning all three editions of the RacingThePlanet Ultramarathon.

==== RacingThePlanet: Vietnam 2008 ====
The first roving race took place in the far northwest of Vietnam. The event got underway in Si Ma Cai after an overnight train ride from Hanoi. Competitors faced a 100-kilometre (62 mi) course on Stage 1. Record floods and cold had hit the area turning the race into the greenest, muddiest and wettest to date. The area was full of hill tribes from the Flower H'Mong and the Red Dao to the Black H'Mong. Competitors stumbled upon a large festival at the last campsite.

Statistics

Date: February 2008

Men's winner - Salvador Calvo Redondo, Spain, 28 hours, 17 mins 50 secs Women's winner - Stephanie Case, USA, 32 hours 53 mins 22 secs (3rd overall)

A totl of 54 competitors began the event, 47 competitors finished, and 20 countries were represented.

==== RacingThe Planet: Namibia 2009 ====
The second race was in southern Namibia starting on the edge of the Fish River Canyon and ending in the town of Luderitz along the Skeleton Coast.

The event featured specially built ladders to climb out of the Fish River Canyon, the second deepest canyon in the world, and a 100-kilometre (62 mi) "Long March". Competitors spent their last night of the event on the Skeleton Coast, in an area which had been off limits to visitors for many years. The champion was Spain's Salvador Redondo Calvo who handed South Africa's Ryan Sandes, the previous 4 Deserts Champion, his only defeat in a RacingThePlanet event - Ryan finished in second place. Famed Italian runner Marco Olmo finished third. Lucy Hilton of the United Kingdom won the women's division in a time of 29:17:45. The team division was won by an Israeli team. Blind athlete Kyoung Tae Song of Korea finished last in a time of 78:21:40.

The Namibia course is considered by those competitors who have completed the 4 Deserts and the other roving races as the most challenging. Renowned British mountaineer and adventurer Annabelle Bond took part in the race.

Statistics

Date: May 2009

Men's winner - Salvador Calvo Redondo, Spain, 25 hours 47 mins 32 secs Women's winner - Lucy Hilton, United Kingdom, 29 hours, 17 mins 45 secs (4th overall)

A total of 214 competitors began the event, 167 competitors finished, and 38 countries were represented.

==== RacingThePlanet: Australia 2010 ====
This was the third year for the roving race to take place in Western Australia, in the Kimberley region between Kununurra, the Gibb River Road, Emma Gorge and El Questro Wilderness Park. Permission was sought to enter and race across aboriginal lands, as well as through El Questro's wilderness reserves. The logistical challenges of the race were many, including having to helicopter in all equipment and water for one campsite that was otherwise completely inaccessible. Late flooding had meant that certain parts of the course had to be changed and the Gibb River Road was unpassable for certain stretches, again adding to the logistical challenges.

The week before the race the Icelandic volcano eruptions ruined the travel plans of many European competitors, with a number unable to fly to Australia. The climate was much more humid than many competitors were used to, so a number of very experienced endurance athletes struggled with the conditions on Stage 1. Once again Salvador Calvo Redondo won every stage of the race.

The number of hospital admissions of dehydrated participants lead to Western Australia Police to contact RacingThePlanet. Until the hospitalisations neither WA Health nor the WA Police had known about the event.

Statistics

Date: April 2010

Men's winner - Salvador Calvo Redondo, Spain, 31 hours 25 mins 00 secs Women's winner - Lia Farley, United States, 32 hours, 34 mins 18 secs (3rd overall)

A total of 185 competitors began the event, 117 competitors finished, and 35 countries were represented.

==== Racing the Planet: Australia 2011 ====
Competitors Kate Sanderson, Turia Pitt, Michael Hull and Shaun van der Merwe were burnt when they encountered a large wildfire. They were gravely injured; Kate Sanderson's injuries lead to the partial amputation of her left foot. The Western Australian government held an inquiry into the planning and actions of RacingThePlanet. The "Inquiry into 2011 Kimberley Ultramarathon Event" was handed down to the WA Legislative Assembly on 16 August 2012. The inquiry found that the "organisers were not legally liable or to blame for shocking burn injuries to competitors". However the report stated the company "did not take all reasonable steps to maintain the safety of competitors, staff or volunteers."

A spokesman for RacingThePlanet said that while "the fire and its consequences are tragic and regrettable" they "were not reasonably foreseeable". However, the inquiry found that the company was aware there had been fires in and around the course on the day of the race and should have recognized the risk posed to competitors, staff and volunteers.

In addition it found "the company did not adequately consult with relevant authorities such as St John Ambulance, and did not make arrangements for the use of a helicopter. The report also found the company failed to test its communication system prior to the race."

Statistics Date: September 2011 Men's winner - none, event abandoned Women's winner - none, event abandoned

==== RacingThePlanet: Nepal 2011 ====
In 2011 the race took place in the Annapurna region of Nepal, outside the town of Pokhara. This was the most mountainous of RacingThePlanet's events so far, with a total elevation gain and loss over the course of 18,700 metres (61,300 feet), with the highest elevation that competitors reached being 3,200 metres (10,500 feet).

The course began at Mardi Kholas and wound its way through the foothills of the Himalayas through Beni, Poon Hill, Birethanti and Begnas Lake.

The local race director was Karma Sherpa, a three time Everest summiteer who helped set the course on tracks used for generations by local Nepalese farmers to reach their crops and water.

Statistics Date: November 2011 Men's winner - Ryan Sandes, South Africa, 25 hours 15 mins 25 secs Women's winner - Stephanie Case, Canada, 30 hours, 15 mins 09 secs (8th overall) A total of 220 competitors began the event, 168 competitors finished, and 38 countries were represented.

==== RacingThePlanet: Jordan 2012 ====
The Roving Race moved to Jordan in 2012, taking in the areas of Wadi Rum and finishing in the UNESCO World Heritage Site of Petra.

The course started in Wadi Rum and took competitors through four deserts world famous for being the area of operations of Lawrence of Arabia. The terrain was a varied landscape of canyons, cliffs, sand dunes, and gorges before finishing outside the treasury of Petra.

The local manager and logistics team were members of the Bedouin community who have lived in the deserts for centuries.

The race had the lowest retirement record of any RacingThePlanet event, with 92% of competitors finishing the race.

Statistics Date: May 2012 Men's winner - Paolo Barghini, Italy, 27 hours 11 mins 03 secs

Women's winner - Katia Figini, Italy, 29 hours, 37 mins 03 secs (5th overall)

A total of 153 competitors began the event, 131 competitors finished, and 38 countries were represented.

==== RacingThePlanet: Iceland 2013 ====
The Roving Race moved to Iceland in 2013, taking in different parts of the country in the highlands of Kerlingjarfjoll and finishing by the mineral rich waters of the Blue Lagoon near Reykjavík. The natural scenery included racing past waterfalls, glaciers, hot springs and volcanic scenery.

Statistics

Date: 2013

Men's Winner - Mo Foustok, Saudi Arabia, 23 hours 04 minutes 08 seconds

Women's Winner, Lia Farley, United States 27 hours we minutes 26 seconds (8th overall)

A total of 270 competitors began the event, 228 finished, and 43 countries represented

==== RacingThePlanet: Madagascar 2014 ====
The Roving Race moved to Madagascar in 2014, taking in different parts of the country in the northern tip of the island. Racers traversed the northern tip of the island, taking a course across white sand beaches, Baobab forests, red Tsingy canyon and massive expanse of grey Tsingy. Throughout the event, race participants also experienced the colorful everyday life of the Malagasy people.

Statistics

Date: September 2014

Men's winner – Ryan Sandes, South Africa, 22 hours 46 mins 42 secs

Women's winner – Maki Izuchi Suban, Japan, 32 hours, 35 mins 38 secs (15th overall)

A total of 235 competitors began the event, 189 competitors finished, and 43 countries were represented.

==== RacingThePlanet: Ecuador 2015 ====
The 8th annual Roving Race took racers along the Route of the Volcanoes through the Andes. Racers started in the foothills of the Cotopaxi volcano, passed through rugged highlands, bedded down in Alpine meadows, forded mountain streams on the ancient Inca trail, descending into a tropical cloud forest and met some of the locals along the way.

Statistics

Date: August 2015

Men's winner – Ake Fagereng, Norway 27 hours 15 mins 57 secs

Women's winner – Sarah Sawyer, United Kingdom, 35 hours, 25 mins 38 secs (17th overall)

A total of 135 competitors began the event, 115 competitors finished, and 35 countries were represented.

==== RacingThePlanet: Sri Lanka 2016 ====
Racers began in the central highlands near Kandy, all the way to the coast of the Indian Ocean, passing through Yala National Park. The race welcomed the first mixed gender team from Afghanistan to participate in an international running event. Kubra, Arzoo and Mahdi raced together under the name Team Sahra, which means ‘desert’ in Dari. The team was brought together by the charity Free To Run.

Statistics

Date: February 2016

Men's winner – Joseph McCann, Australia 28 hours 17 mins 37 secs

Women's winner – Sandy Suckling, Australia, 31 hours, 40 mins 27 secs (5th overall) A total of 61 competitors began the event, 46 competitors finished, and 27 countries were represented.

==== RacingThePlanet: Patagonia 2017 ====
The 10th edition of RacingThePlanet Ultramarathon took place in the Patagonia region of Argentina. The course featured Lake Nahuel Huapi in Bariloche, vast pampas, snow-capped peaks of the Andes, pristine lakes, colourful Patagonian culture and remote forest trails. The race concluded at the Blue Lagoon underneath the Tronador Mountain near the border of Argentina and Chile.

Statistics

Date: November 2017

Men's winner – Neill Weir, United Kingdom 20 hours 59 mins 23 secs

Women's winner – Sarah Sawyer, United Kingdom, 27 hours, 10 mins 24 secs (23rd overall)

A total of 286 competitors began the event, 273 competitors finished, and 39 countries were represented.

==== RacingThePlanet: New Zealand 2019 ====
Racers experienced the South Island, including a challenging climb up Roys Peak. The race was one of the more challenging races as it included over 9,000 meters / 29,000 feet of elevation over 7 days of racing.

Statistics

Date: March 2019

Men's winner – Christophe Santini, France, 34 hours 42 mins 02 secs

Women's winner – Celine Pichette Canada, 41 hours, 06 mins 58 secs (11th overall)

A total of 159 competitors began the event, 106 competitors finished, and 31 countries were represented.
