= Stephanie Case =

Canadian lawyer and ultramarathon runner

Stephanie Case (born 1982) is a Canadian human rights lawyer, ultramarathon runner, and founder of the women's running advocacy organization Free to Run. She has worked for the United Nations in regions including Afghanistan, Gaza, and South Sudan.

Case received international notice for winning the Ultra-Trail Snowdonia ultramarathon in May 2025, her first race in three years, while breastfeeding her six-month-old child at rest stations along the route.

In 2026, Case was the first female finisher ever for the 100 mile Antarctic Ice Ultra. She set the female 100 mile world record, finishing over 5 hours faster than the previous overall world record.

== Further information ==
- Case, Stephanie. "Ultrarunner Stephanie Case, Alice Figueiredo, Women's Super League, Cycle tracking apps". Woman's Hour (Interview). Interviewed by McGovern, Nuala. BBC.
