= Sean Huang =

Taiwanese actor

Sean Huang (Chinese: 黃遠; Pe̍h-ōe-jī: N̂g Oán; born 19 June 1991) is a Taiwanese actor. The son of actor Michael Huang, Sean Huang made his film debut in 2010. He won the Golden Bell Award for Best Actor in a Miniseries or Television Film in 2011.

== Selected filmography ==
- Days We Stared at the Sun (2010)
- (Sex) Appeal (2014)
- 10,000 Miles (2016)
- Missing Johnny (2017)
