= Rainbow Valley (California) =

Small valley in Riverside County and San Diego County in California, USA

Coordinates: 33.416°N 117.148°W

Rainbow Valley is a small valley in Riverside County and San Diego County in the U.S. state of California. Rainbow is a census-designated place within the area.

The area was previously known as Vallecitos ("little valley") and was renamed Rainbow Valley in the late 1880s after James Peebles Marshall Rainbow, who bought a homestead there.
