= List of ultramarathons =

This is a list of ultramarathons.

== Road, dirt path, and track ultramarathons ==
Location	Name
Canada	Self-Transcendence 24 Hour Race Ottawa
Greece	Spartathlon
Japan	Lake Saroma Ultramarathon 100 km / 50 km
Japan	River Shimanto Ultramarathon 100 km / 60 km
South Africa	Breaking Barriers 50km
South Africa	Comrades Marathon
South Africa	Two Oceans Marathon
Switzerland	Biel/Bienne 100 km
Turkey	Salomon Cappodocia Ultra Trail
Turkey	KAÇKAR BY UTMB
United Kingdom	Dartmoor Discovery
United Kingdom	Grand Union Canal 145 mile Race
United Kingdom	Barry 40
United Kingdom	London to Brighton
United Kingdom	Marlborough Downs Challenge
United States	JFK 50 Mile
United States	Self-Transcendence 3100 Mile Race
United States	Way Too Cool 50 Kilometer

=== Mountain and trail ultramarathons ===
Location	Name
South Africa	Addo Elephant Trail Run
United States	American River 50 Mile Endurance Run
United States	Angeles Crest 100 Mile Endurance Run
United States	Barkley Marathons
United States	Bear 100 Mile Endurance Run
Canada	Canadian Death Race
Sweden	Fjällmaraton
Nicaragua	Fuego y Agua 25k,50k,100K & Survival Run
Réunion	Grand Raid de la Réunion
United States	Grindstone 100 Miler
United States	Hardrock Hundred Mile Endurance Run
Turkey	İznik Ultramarathon
United States	Javelina Jundred
United States	JFK 50 Mile
United States	Kettle Moraine 100 Endurance Runs
Papua New Guinea	Kokoda Challenge Race
Canada	Knee Knackering North Shore Trail Run
Iceland	Laugavegur Ultramarathon
United States	Leadville Trail 100
United States	Lean Horse Ultramarathon
Turkey	Lycian Way Ultramarathon
United Kingdom	Lyke Wake Challenge
United States	McNaughton Park Trail Runs
United States	Miwok 100K Trail Race
United States	Moab 240
United States	Mountain Masochist Trail Run
Hong Kong	Oxfam Trailwalker
Australia	Oxfam Trailwalker
Germany	Rennsteiglauf
South Africa	Rhodes Trail Run
United Kingdom	Spine Race
United States	StumpJump 50k
New Zealand	Tarawera Ultramarathon
Spain	Transvulcania
Bulgaria	Tryavna Ultra
Japan	Ultra-Trail Mt. Fuji
France	Ultra-Trail du Mont-Blanc
United States	Vermont 100 Mile Endurance Run
United States	Wasatch Front 100 Mile Endurance Run
United Kingdom	West Highland Way Race
United States	Western States Endurance Run

=== Extreme-condition ultramarathons ===
Location	Name
Italy	Tor des Géants
Morocco	Marathon des Sables
United States	Badwater Ultramarathon
South Africa	Kalahari Augrabies Extreme Marathon
Turkey	Runfire Cappadocia Ultramarathon
China	4 Deserts
Egypt	4 Deserts
Chile	4 Deserts
Antarctica	4 Deserts

=== Very long and multi-day ultramarathons ===
Location	Name	Description
Global	7in7on7	The first attempt to run 7 ultramarathons in 7 days on all 7 continents.
Canada	Yukon Arctic Ultra	Whitehorse to Dawson City, Yukon, 430 miles (692 km) in 13 days. Described as the coldest and toughest ultra in the world.
Canada	Bruce Trail	Ontario, Canada 800 kilometers in (10–15 days).
United States	Self-Transcendence 3100 Mile Race	World's longest certified footrace (52 days)
United States	Self-Transcendence 6- & 10-day Race	(6 and 10 days)
Germany	Spreelauf	(6 days)
Europe	Trans Europe Foot Race	
France	Paris-Colmar	450 km march (Racewalking).
France	Trans-Gaule	
Morocco	Marathon des Sables	6 days 251 km in the Sahara desert
United Kingdom	Dragon's Back Race	6-day stage race along Welsh mountain ranges
United Kingdom	Spine Race	431 km along the Pennine Way in winter
United Kingdom	Spine Fusion	431 km along the Pennine Way in summer
