= Bill Farmer (disambiguation) =

Bill Farmer (born 1952) is an American voice actor and comedian.

Bill, Billy, or William Farmer may also refer to:

- Bill Farmer (public servant) (born 1947), an Australian public servant and policymaker
- Bill Farmer (baseball) (1864–1928), a professional baseball player
- William M. Farmer (1853–1931), an American jurist and politician
- William R. Farmer (1929–2000), an American professor of theology
- William Wood Farmer (1813–1854), lieutenant governor of Louisiana from 1853–1854
- William Farmer (runner), a participant in the 2009 Laugavegur Ultramarathon
- Billy Farmer, a character in the comic The Leopard from Lime Street
