= Mahmut Yavuz =

Turkish Navy officer (born 1982)

- Born: Mahmut Yavuz; 1982 (age 43–44); Eskişehir, Turkey
- Military career
- Allegiance: Turkey
- Branch: Turkish Navy - Marines and Special Forces
- Rank: Lieutenant
- Unit: SAT Commando (Underwater Attack)
- Other work: Ultramarathon running

Mahmut Yavuz (born 1982) is a Turkish Navy officer, who serves, currently as a lieutenant, in the SAT Commando (Underwater Attack) unit of the Marines and Special Forces. He is best known for his successful career as an ultramarathon runner and his indistinct fast speech. He holds many records and currently works as a running instructor.

Mahmut Yavuz was born in 1982. At the age of 14, he entered the Naval High School on the island Heybeliada in Istanbul. After finishing high school, he attended the Naval Academy in Tuzla, Istanbul. He graduated with a BSc degree in computer engineering. He was commissioned as an officer of the SAT Commando (Underwater Attack) at the Turkish Navy Marines and Special Forces, a similar unit to the Underwater Demolition Team of the United States Navy SEALs. As of November 2013, Yavuz has the rank of a navy lieutenant (Turkish: Deniz Yüzbaşısı), and is stationed in Keçilik village at Anadolu Kavağı, Beykoz, Istanbul.

== Sports career ==
Mahmut Yavuz used to perform running sport during high school and academy years, participating in competitions. Following his graduation from the naval academy, he began to run half marathons and marathons. In later years, Yavuz became interested in ultra running. In 2012, he debuted in ultramarathon running as he took part in the 130 km (81 mi) İznik Ultramarathon. In order to be prepared for the ultramarathons, he trains around 110–120 km (68–75 mi) within the week. Due to his strict duty times, he participates at the single-stage competitions on weekends, and at multiday races only during his vacation.

He lately ran in ultramarathons with extreme conditions in Turkey, China and Republic of South Africa. Mahmut Yavuz admits that the training in terms of physical and psychological endurance he received during the SAT commando courses is an absolutely significant advantage at this type of competition.

Yavuz won the 2012 İznik Ultramarathon over 126 km (78 mi), and repeated his success by winning the first edition of the six-day Runfire Cappadocia Ultramarathon the same year.

After coming first at the 2013 İznik Ultramarathon again, he became runner-up at the seven-day lasting and 250 km (160 mi) long Gobi March in China, the second event of the 4 Deserts series. Yavuz won the DASK Anatolian Mountain Marathon held at Mount Bolu on 5–6 July 2013 together with his teammate İlyas Avcı. After attesting his first rank at the desert-concept event of Runfire Cappadocia Ultra in 2013, he placed second at the 250 km (160 mi) Kalahari Augrabies Extreme Marathon held on 19–25 October 2013 in the Republic of South Africa.

Year	Competition	Distance	Time (h:m:s)	Rank (women's cat)
2012	(Turkey) İznik Ultramarathon	126 km (78 mi)	15:41:03	1st
2012	(Turkey) Runfire Cappadocia Ultramarathon	240 km (150 mi)	27:59:43	1st
2013	(Turkey) İznik Ultramarathon	130 km (81 mi)	13:52:06	1st
2013	(China) Gobi March	250 km (160 mi)	27:24:19	2nd
2013	(Turkey) DASK Anatolian Mountain Marathon	90–130 km (56–81 mi)		1st with İlyas Avcı
2013	(Turkey) Runfire Cappadocia Ultramarathon	245 km (152 mi)	27:27:18	1st
2013	(South Africa) Kalahari Augrabies Extreme Marathon	250 km (160 mi)	22:26:54	2nd
2013	(Turkey) Intersport Run	11 km (6.8 mi)	0:42:	9th
