= Breaking Barriers 50km =

Annual race in South Africa since 2021

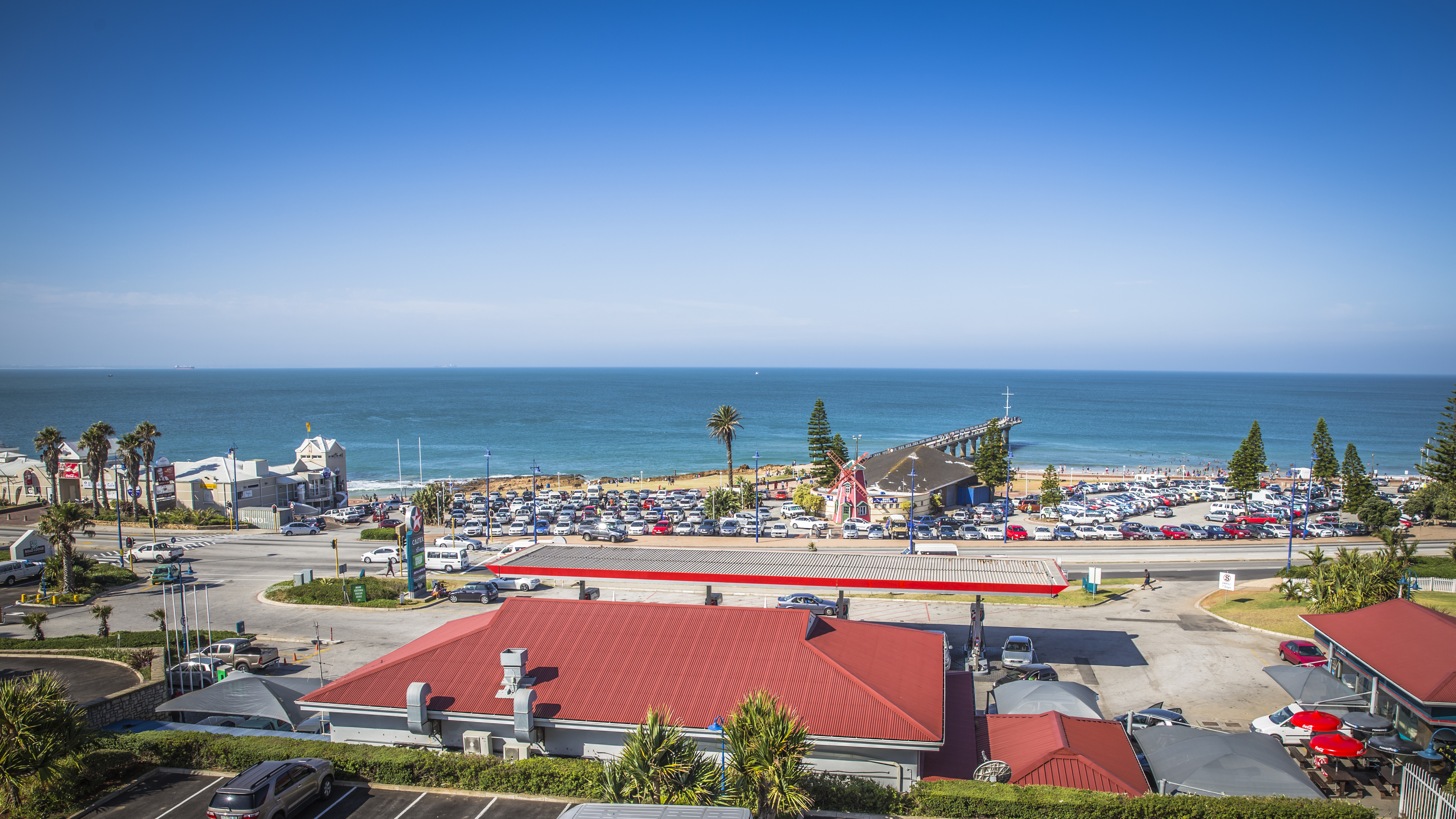
- Marine Drive along Hobie Beach in Summerstrand, part of the northwest leg of the race course
- Date: February or March
- Location: Gqeberha, South Africa
- Event type: Road
- Distance: 50K ultramarathon
- Primary sponsor: Nedbank
- Established: 2021 (5 years ago)
- Course records: 2:39:04 (2023) (men); (South Africa) Tete Dijana; 3:00:30 (2023) (women); (Ethiopia) Emane Seifu Hayile
- Website: About Us Nedbank Runified 50km
- Participants: 92 finishers (2023); 48 finishers (2022)

The Breaking Barriers 50km (also known as the Nedbank Runified Breaking Barriers 50km for sponsorship reasons) is an annual road-based ultramarathon hosted by Gqeberha, South Africa, since 2021. The ultramarathon is a World Athletics Elite Label Road Race. As of the 2023 race, a new 50K world record has been set every year the race has been held.

== History ==
The inaugural race was held on Sunday 23 May 2021. The 50K was won by Ethiopian runner Ketema Negasa and South African runner Irvette van Zyl, with finish times of 2:42:07 and 3:04:24, respectively. Negasa set the 50K world record for men, while van Zyl set the 50K world record for women in a women-only race.

On 6 March 2022, the second running of the race, South African runner Stephen Mokoka broke the world record with a finish time of 2:40:13 in his 50K debut, while Ethiopian runner Amelework Fekadu, with her winning time of 3:04:58, missed breaking the record van Zyl set the previous year by about half a minute.

The third running of the race was held on 26 February 2023. Ethiopian runner Emane Seifu Hayile set a new 50K world record for a women-only race with her finish time of 3:00:30, beating van Zyl's time by nearly four minutes. South African runner Tete Dijana, winner of the 2022 Comrades Marathon, also set a new course record, and a new South African 50K record, with his winning time of 2:39:04. (Note: Some sources reported that Tete Dijana set a new world record, while others noted that U.S. runner CJ Albertson had run a faster 50K a few months earlier, with a finish time of 2:38:43 at the Ruth Anderson Memorial Endurance Run in San Francisco, California, although Albertson's time had yet to be ratified as a world record.)

== Course ==
External image
- Course map of 50K in 2021

The ultramarathon is run on a loop course along the M4 freeway in Gqeberha on Marine Drive and Beach Road. The course runs largely along the coast. The loop is 10 km (6.2 mi) long and is run five times.

The race begins and ends in front of the Piet Retief Monument in Summerstrand, near Pollock Beach. Runners first head southeast along Marine Drive for about 2 km (1.2 mi) before turning around. The course then heads northwest for about 5 km (3.1 mi), reaching another turnaround point on Beach Road. Runners then head back southeast to the starting point for the final 3 km (1.9 mi) of the loop.

== Winners ==
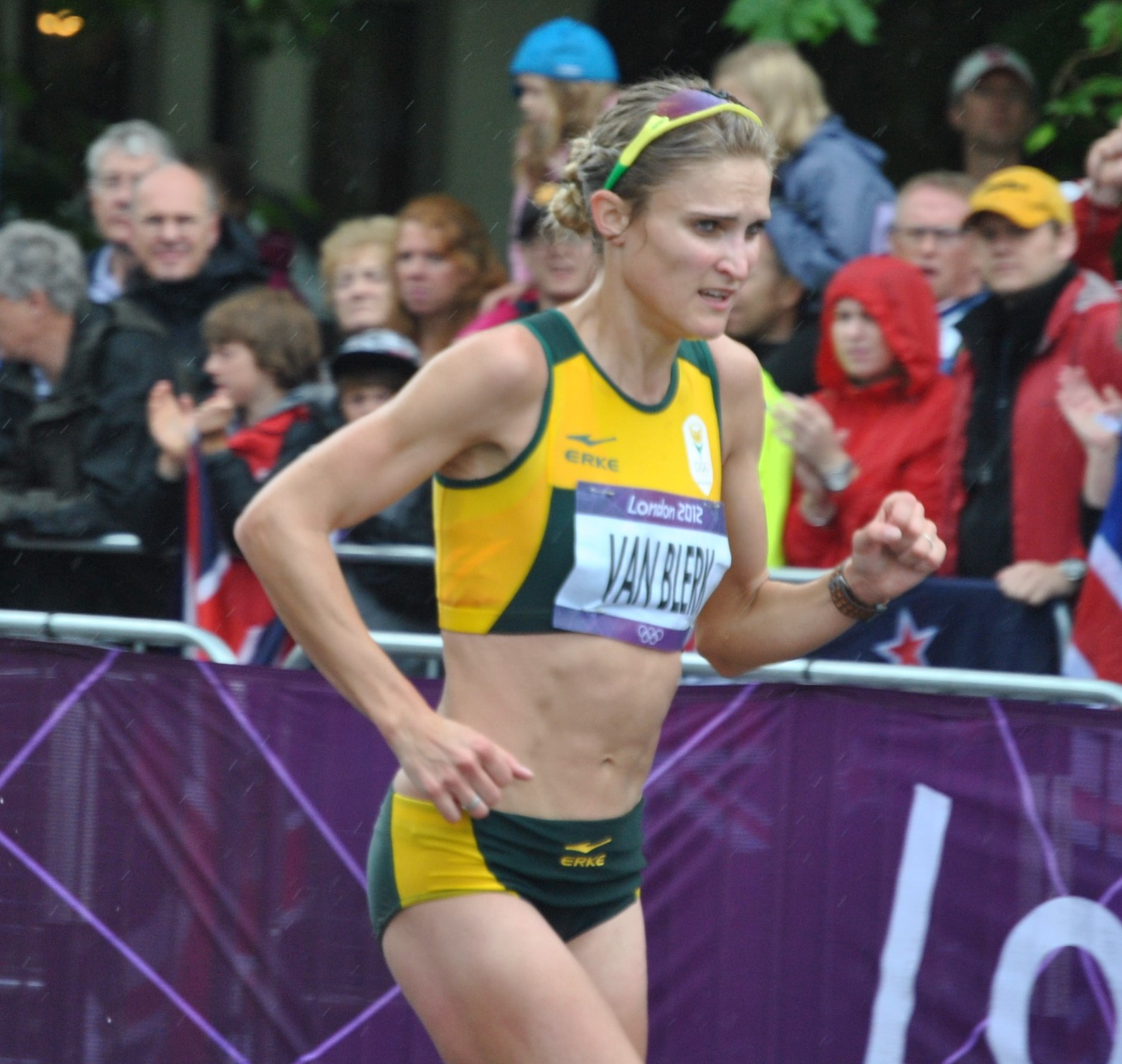
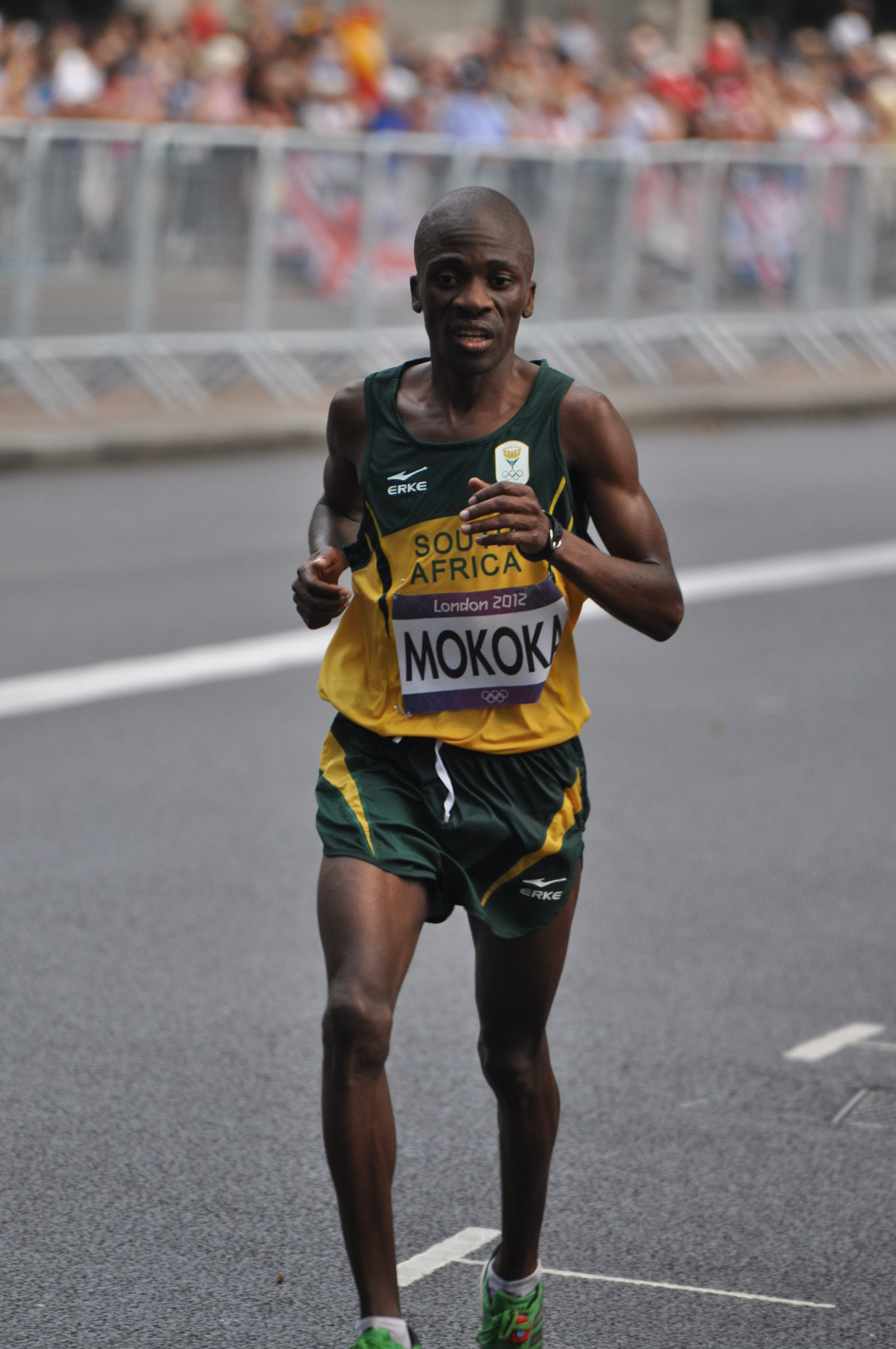
South African runners Irvette van Zyl (left) and Stephen Mokoka (both pictured here running the marathon course of the 2012 London Olympics), who both set 50K world records with their victories, van Zyl in 2021 and Mokoka in 2022

Key: Course record (in bold)

Ed.	Date	Male Winner	Time	Female Winner	Time	Rf.
1	2021.05.23	Ketema Negasa (ETH)	2:42:07 WR	Irvette van Zyl (ZAF)	3:04:24 WR	
2	2022.03.06	Stephen Mokoka (ZAF)	2:40:13 WR	Amelework Fekadu (ETH)	3:04:58	
3	2023.02.26	Tete Dijana (ZAF)	**2:39:04** NR	Emane Seifu Hayile (ETH)	**3:00:30** WR	
