= Adolf Weidmann =

German athlete and sports official

Adolf Weidmann (8 October 1901 in Frankfurt am Main – 26 June 1997) was a German athlete and sports official. He is best known for his numerous age-group records in the ultra-marathon.

== Life ==
=== General ===
He was the first of five sons of Adolf Weidmann and his wife Caroline. The family moved to Riga, Warsaw and Kiev to Rovno, where his father worked as a brewer. With the outbreak of World War II came the designation and the family moved to Lorraine, which they had to leave after the end of the war. They finally came to Glan-Münchweiler in Rheinland-Pfalz.

Weidmann begun at an early age with the sport. In 1922 he co-founded the "Turn-und Sport-Verein Glan-Münchweiler. During his studies of economics and his promotion about the taxation of beer, he participated in several College and High School Championships. His strongest competition distances were then 800 meters to 5,000 meters. As chairman of Deutsche Bundesbank's employee-council, he was involved in the creation and development of their sports department.

When Weidmann was 64-year-old, he learned in 1966 for the first time of the Bieler days with the ultra-marathon running over 100 kilometres. He later said: ". Without thinking much, I thought that this was possible" In the same year he started his first race in Biel and finished in 17 hours 8 minutes. In 1974 he ran his fastest 100-kilometre run with 14:50 hh:mm. 1982 he brought the world record in his age group M80 (men aged 80 years). After that, he was always at the start and ran in 1986 with 21 hours to the German age-group record for the M85 age group (men over 85 years). Two years later (1988) he reached even the world record 21:32:21 in this age group. In 1991 he ran as a 90-year-old this distance in 22:35:13.

In August 1995, he was 92 years old at that time, he participated in a 10.000m run at the doctors and pharmacists Championship. He commented about it, that the journey to the race was harder for him than the race itself. He finished in 95 minutes.

On November the 25 in 1994 the German Ultra-Marathon-Union (DUV) promoted him to their first Honorary Member and founded in October 1997 after his death, the Dr. Adolf Weidmann price.

=== Teaspoon rations ===
Due to problems with food intake during his runs, Weidmann wanted to end his ultramarathon-career in the mid-1970s. After the Munich Marathon September the 17th in 1977 he discovered that he tolerated beer in very small sips. This method, he called it "teaspoon-rations", then has contributed since 1978 to his success. It was the only way for Adolf Weidmann to drink during a race and he wouldn't have been able to finish without his teaspoon-rations-method. However, he later preferred mineral water or milk instead of beer later.

=== At Biel ===
Weidmann started 23 times in total at the Bieler 100 km-Run and finished 20 times. He gained four age-group-records, of which three are valid until today (2011):

Race	Year	Time	Rank	Participants	Comments
01	1966	17:08:00	276	794	
02	1967	unknown	259	973	
01	1966	17:08:00	276	794	
02	1967	unknown	259	973	
03	1970	unknown	672	1804	
04	1971	unknown	627	1971	
05	1972	unknown	653	2595	
06	1974	14:50:00	806	3447	his fastest 100 km-race
07	1975	unknown	1317	3747	
08	1976	unknown	1936	3927	
09	1977	unknown	2082	3775	
10	1978	unknown	1978	4044	
11	1979	unknown	2617	3946	
12	1980	DNF	---	4106	Pain in shoulders and arms
13	1981	DNF	---	4054	stomach-problems
14	1982	20:40:00	2586	4012	World-Record M80 (until 1998)
15	1983	20:46:00	3072	4248	
16	1984	21:12:00	3127	4119	
17	1985	21:01:00	2711	3892	
18	1986	21:00:00	2687	3674	German Record M85
19	1987	DNF	---	3414	
20	1988	21:32:21	2499	3932	World Record M85
21	1989	21:09:21	2367	3488	
22	1990	22:23:37	2317	3715	
23	1991	22:35:13	2025	3404	German Record M90

== As author ==
Weidmann has written some reports about his races. For example a very detailed report about his first race in Biel is published (in German) on www.steppenhahn.de. He also published several stories in the local papers of his home, the Westrich-Kalender, about the local environment (e.g. local history, traditions and customs,...).

1983 Weidmann also wrote an article about himself and his training with respect to the Biel 100 km run to the Westrich-Kalender.
