= European Ultramarathon Cup =

The European Ultramarathon Cup, also known as the Europacup Ultramarathon (ECU), was an annual cup event covering some of the biggest Ultramarathon races in Europe from 1992 until 2019.

== History ==
The European Ultramarathon Cup began after the fall of the Berlin Wall before that year's Rennsteiglauf, at the time the biggest sporting event in East Germany. Representatives from the Rennsteiglauf, the Biel running days, and the Swabian Alb Marathon met to organize the first series. It was expanded to an annual series with a yearly award ceremony in 2002.

== League ==
For a league score, for each runner the three best races during a calendar year were scored. The weighting factor was calculated based on the best finishing times during the previous year and is normalized on the finishing time of the 100 km Del Passatore. The runners were ranked based on their average score.

== League races ==
(2019)

Month	Country	Name	Description
March	France	Trail du Petit Ballon	Rouffach, 52 km, 2300 m climb
May	Austria	Bizau Ultratrail	Bizau, 50 km, 2900 Hm
May	Belgium	Le Grand Trail	Bütgenbach, 105/60 km, 2800/1620 Hm
May	Italy	100 km del Passatore	Florence, 100 km
July	Italy	Schlern Rosengarten Skymarathon	Tiers, 45 km, 2980 m climb
August	Germany	Monschau Ultramarathon	Monschau, 56 km, 950 m climb
September	Slovenia	Celje-Logarska Dolina	Celje, 75 km
October	Germany	Albmarathon	Schwäbisch Gmünd 50 km, 1100 m climb

== Previous league races ==
- Rennsteiglauf, 73 km, Germany
- Wachau-Ultramarathon, 51 km, Austria
- Wörthersee-Trail, 60 km, Austria
- Biel Running Days, 100 km, Switzerland
