= Runfire Cappadocia Ultramarathon =

Ultramarathon event in Turkey

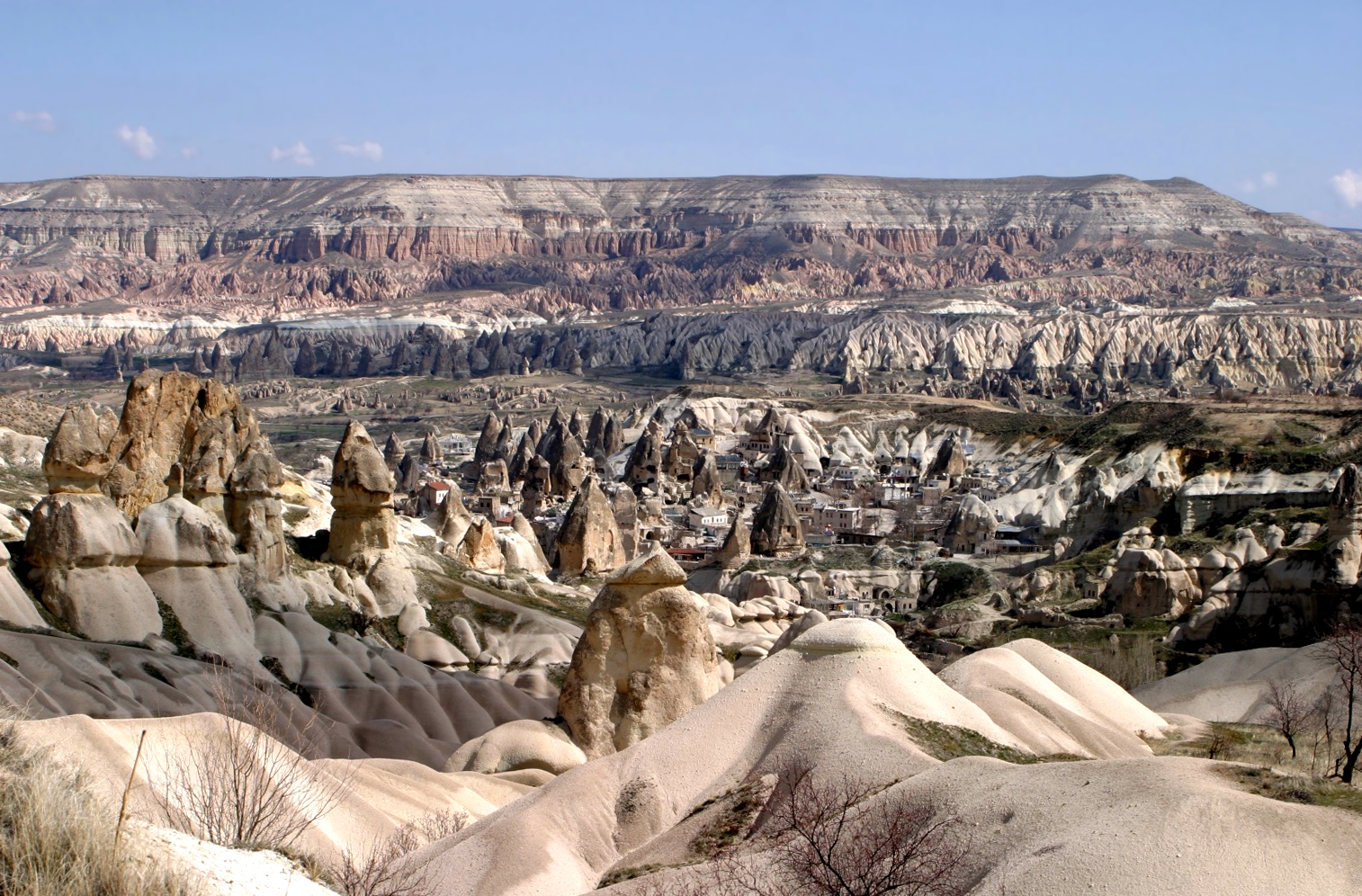
- View of Cappadocia.
- Date: July
- Location: Cappadocia, Turkey
- Event type: Multiday desert track
- Distance: 244 km (152 mi)
- Primary sponsor: Argos Culture & Arts
- Established: July 7, 2012; 14 years ago
- Course records: men's: 27:27:18 (2013); women's: 29:15:30 (2012)

Location of start and finish point of the Runfire Cappadocia Ultramarathon in Üçhisar.

Runfire Cappadocia Ultramarathon, shortly RFC, (Turkish: Runfire Kapadokya Ultramaratonu) is an international multiday ultramarathon event of desert concept that takes place mostly across the historic Cappadocia region in central Turkey. The event is run 244 km (152 mi) in the provinces Nevşehir and Aksaray in six days. The Runfire Cappadocia Ultramarathon was established in 2012 taking place on July 7–15. It is considered a race of high-degree difficulty. The event is organized by Argos Culture & Arts.

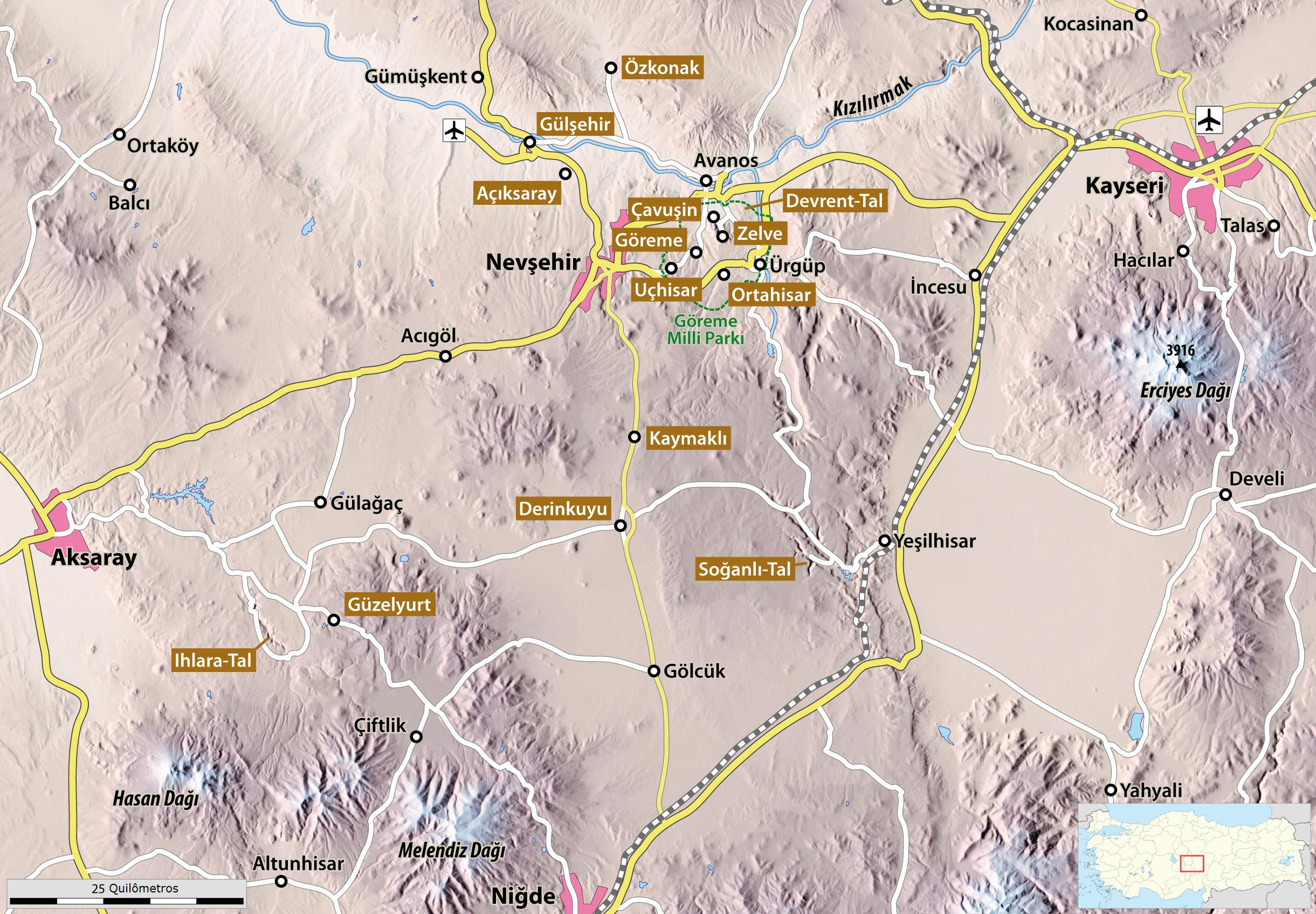
Map of Cappadocia

The route starts in front of the Uçhisar Town Hall in Nevşehir. Following the Valley of Pigeons (Güvercinlik Vadisi), Ortahisar, Acıgöl, Damsa Dam, Analipsis Monastery (Yüksekli Kilise), Güzelyurt, Avanos, Ihlara Valley, Mount Hasan and around Lake Tuz before crossing through Çavuşin and the Ürgüp and Göreme valleys, the marathon ends in Üçhisar, where it started. The longest daily stage is on salt flats around Lake Tuz with 93 km (58 mi). The route features elevations between 900–1,700 m (3,000–5,600 ft), valleys, salt lake flats, spectacular rock formations and UNESCO World Heritage sites as well as cave churches and galleries, historic underground cities that made Cappadocia a world-famous tourism destination.

The event is accredited by Ultra-Trail du Mont-Blanc, one of the world’s most prestigious marathons. Finishers are awarded four points, which entitle them to participate at the world’s major ultramarathons. The International Association of Ultrarunners (IAU) included the RFC in its competition calendar, and titled it a bronze-label event in 2013.

At the first race in 2012, some 60 local and foreign athletes of both gender took part, among them ultra runners from Denmark, France, Italy, Russia and South Africa.

== Winners ==
Key: Course record

Year	Men's winner	Time (h:m:s)	Women's winner	Time (h:m:s)
2012	(Turkey) Mahmut Yavuz	27:59:43	(Russia) Elena Polyakova	33:51:52
2013	(Turkey) Mahmut Yavuz	27:27:18	(Russia) Elena Polyakova	29:15:30
2014				

== Gallery ==
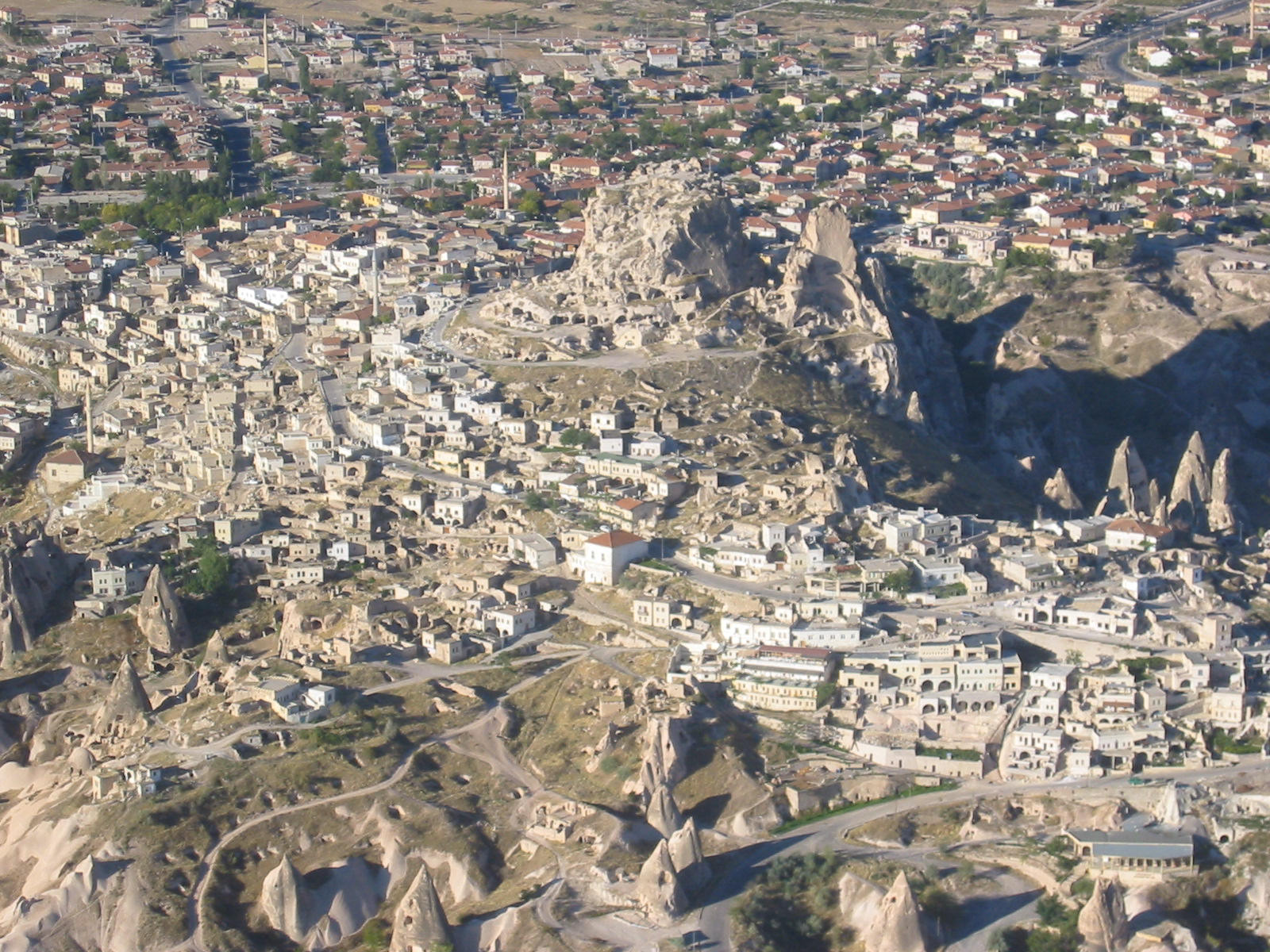
Aerial view of Uçhisar

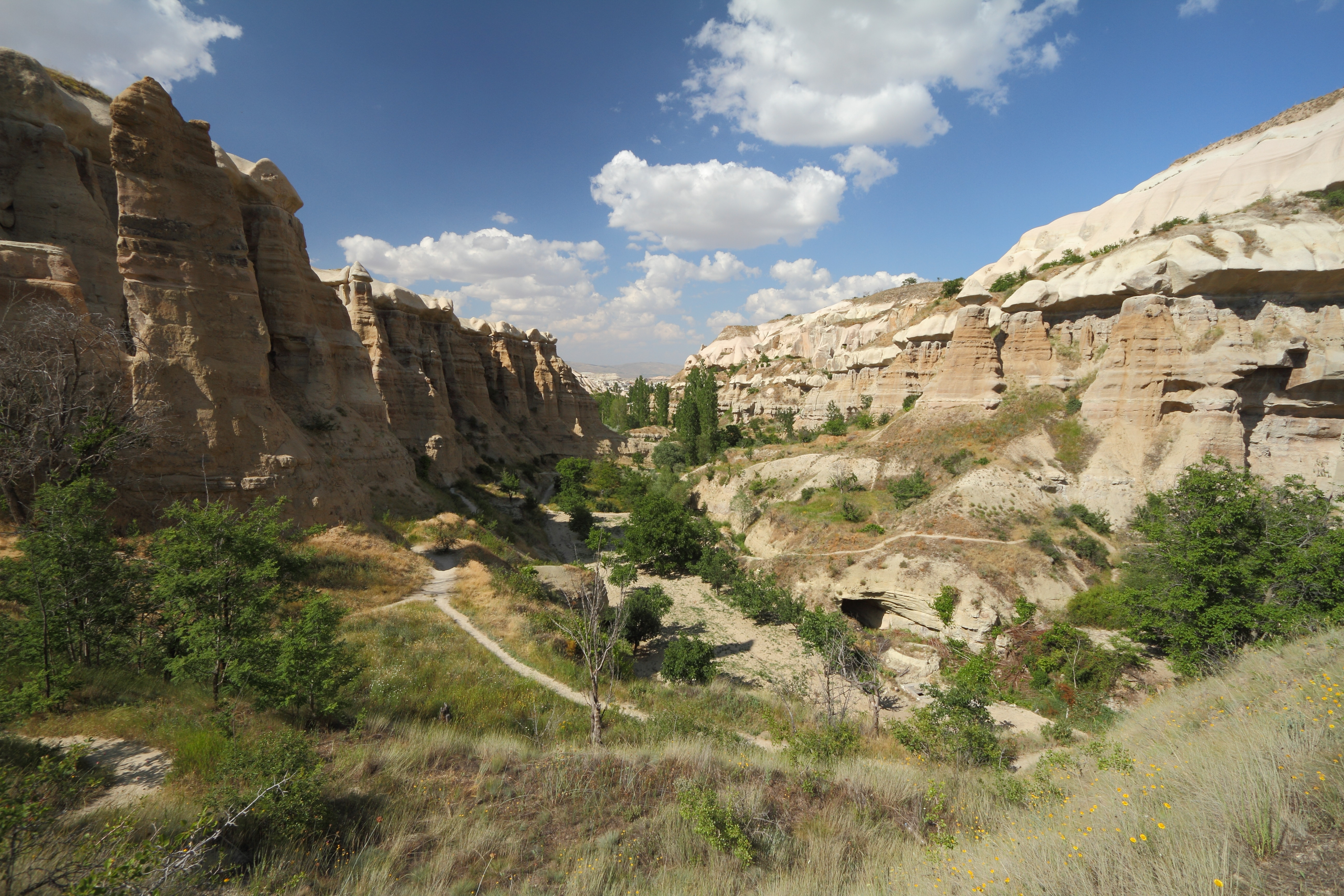
Valley of Pigeons

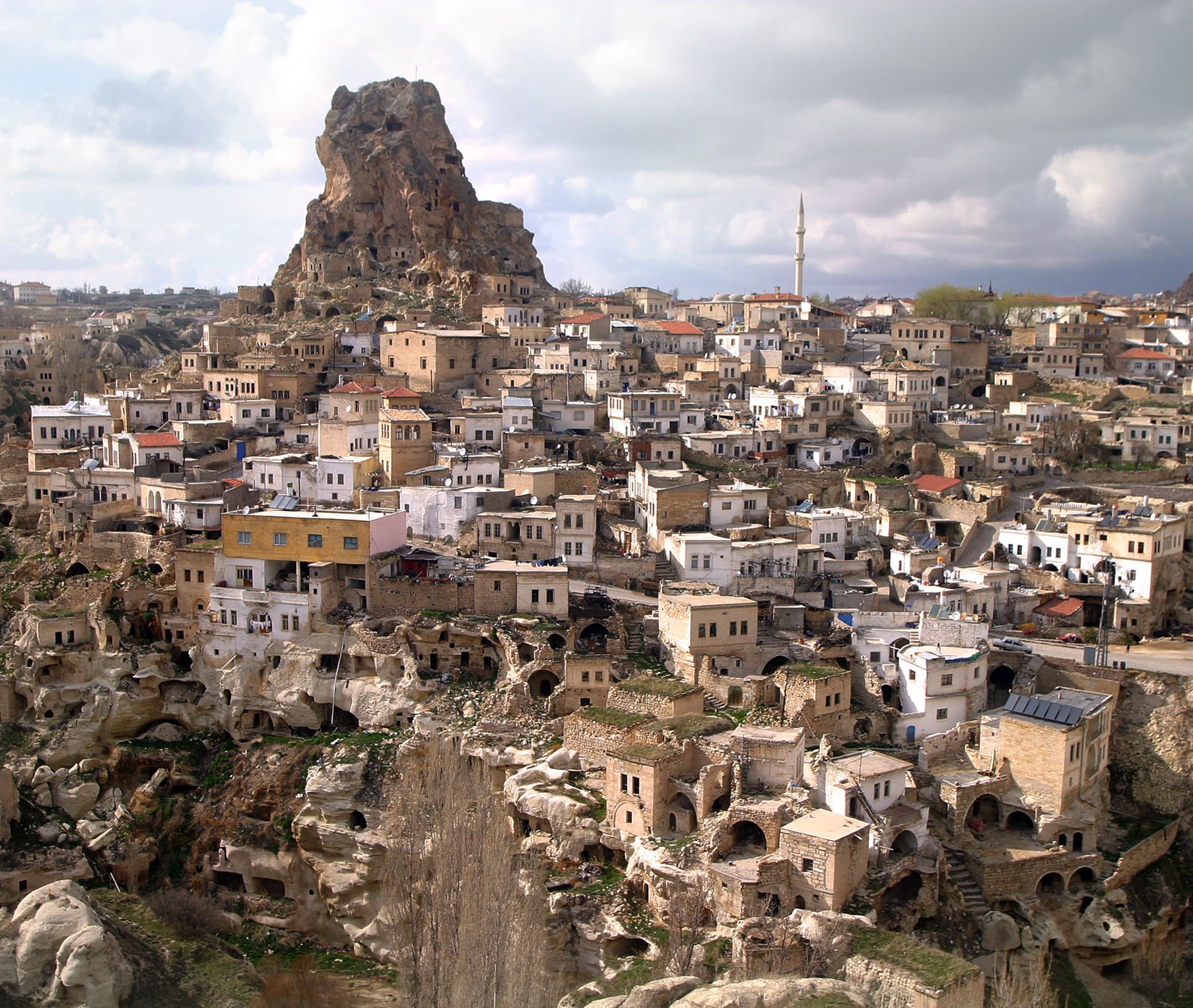
Ortahisar

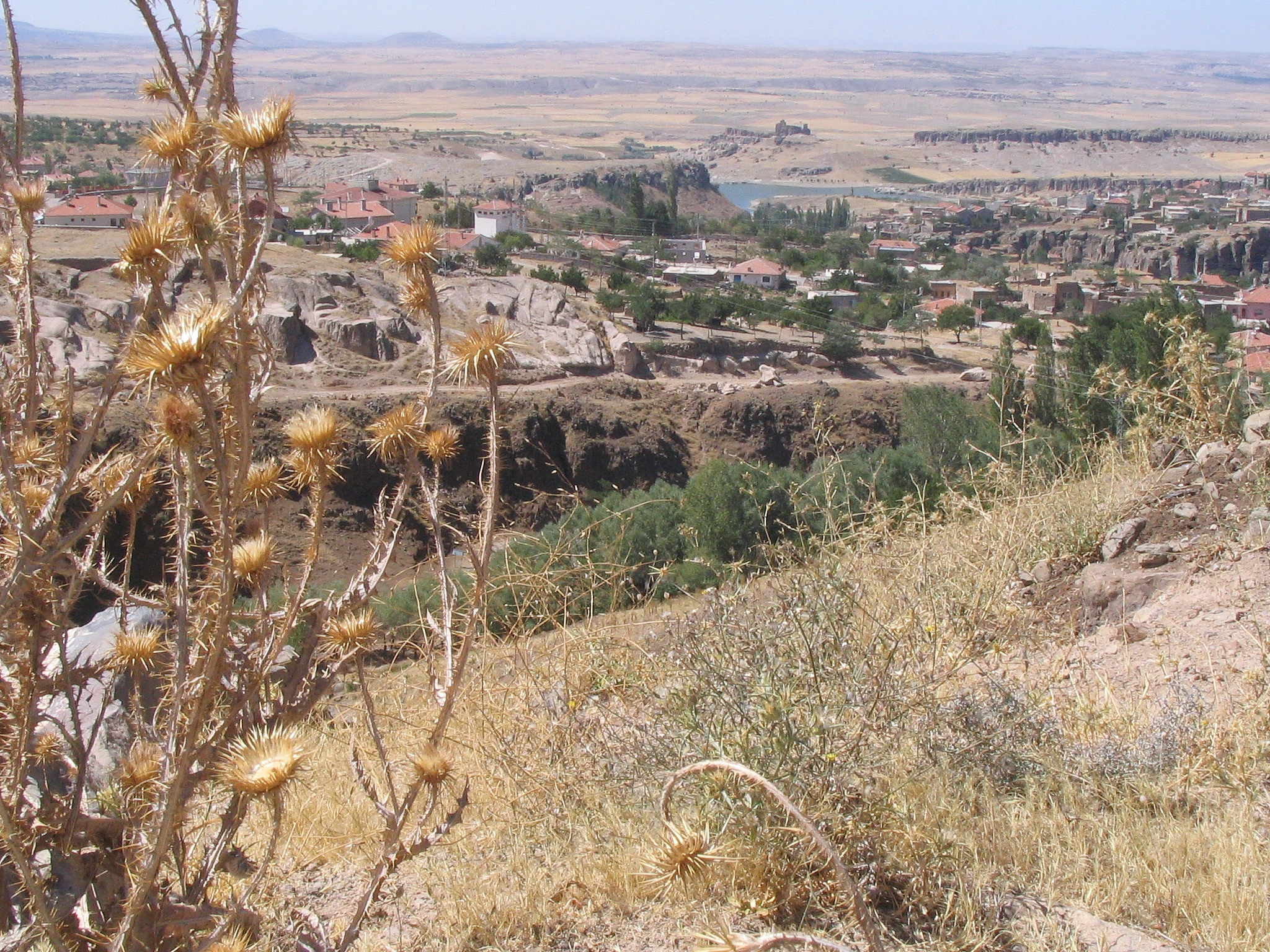
Güzelyurt

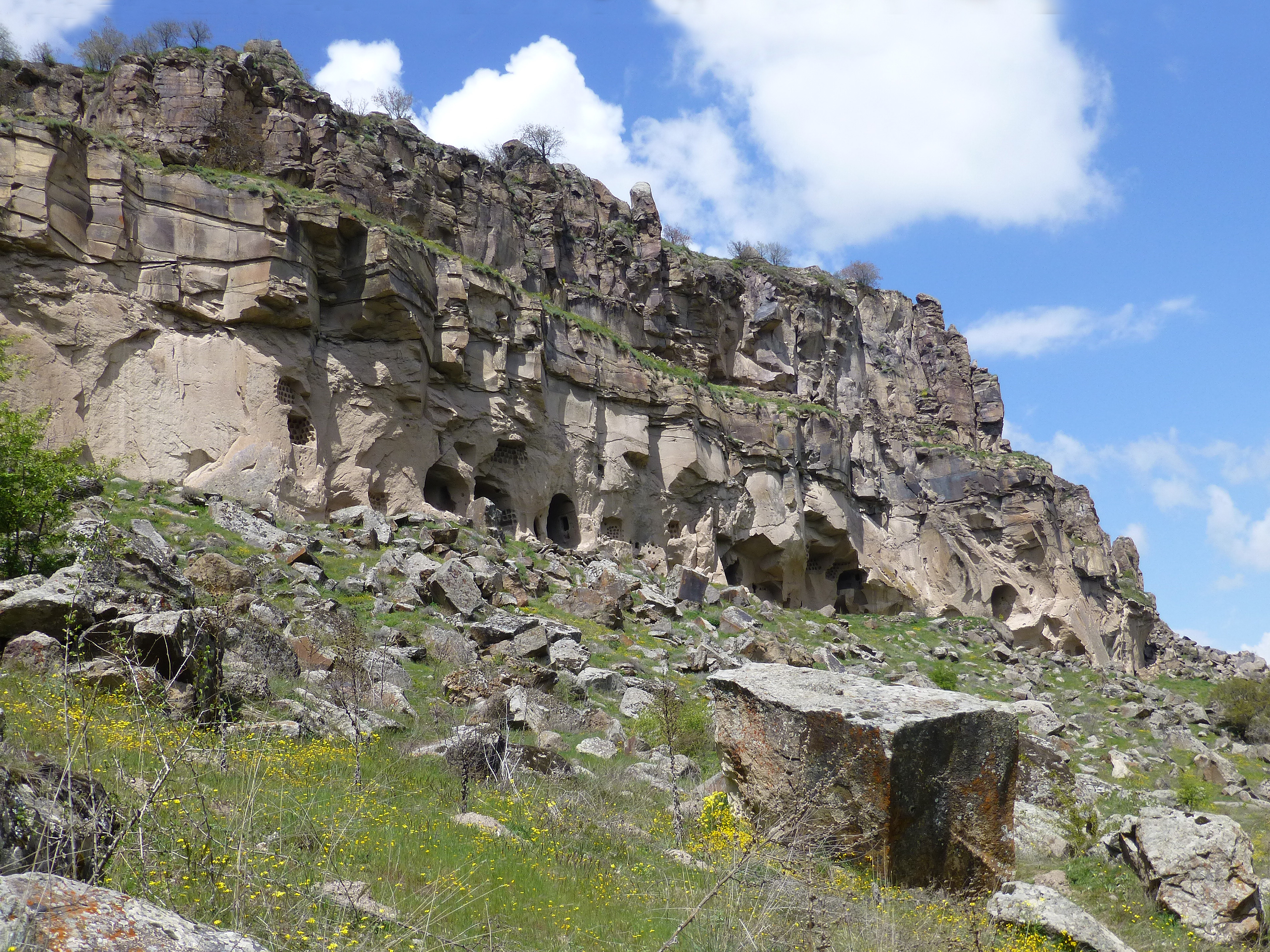
Ihlara Valley

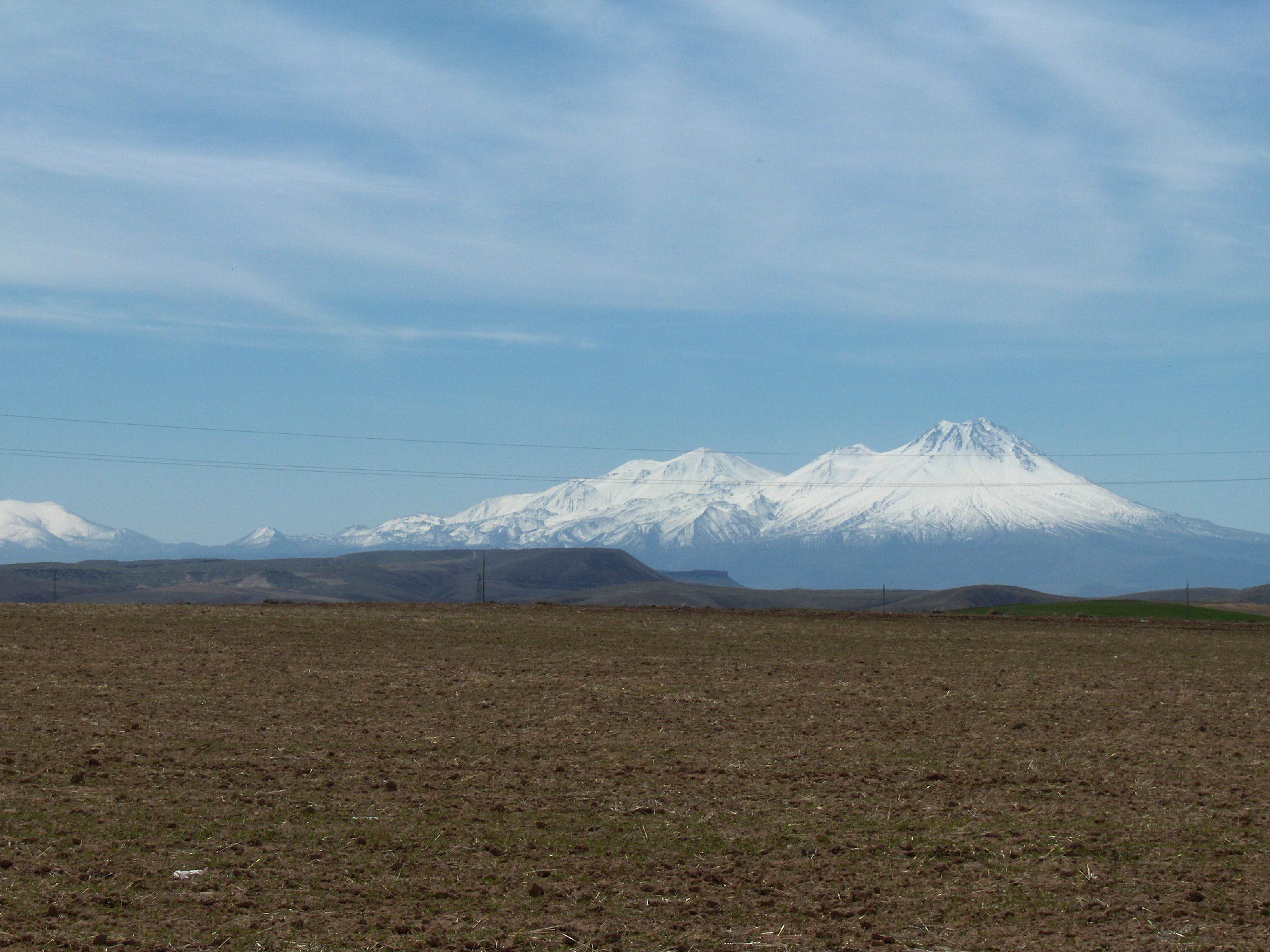
Mount Hasan

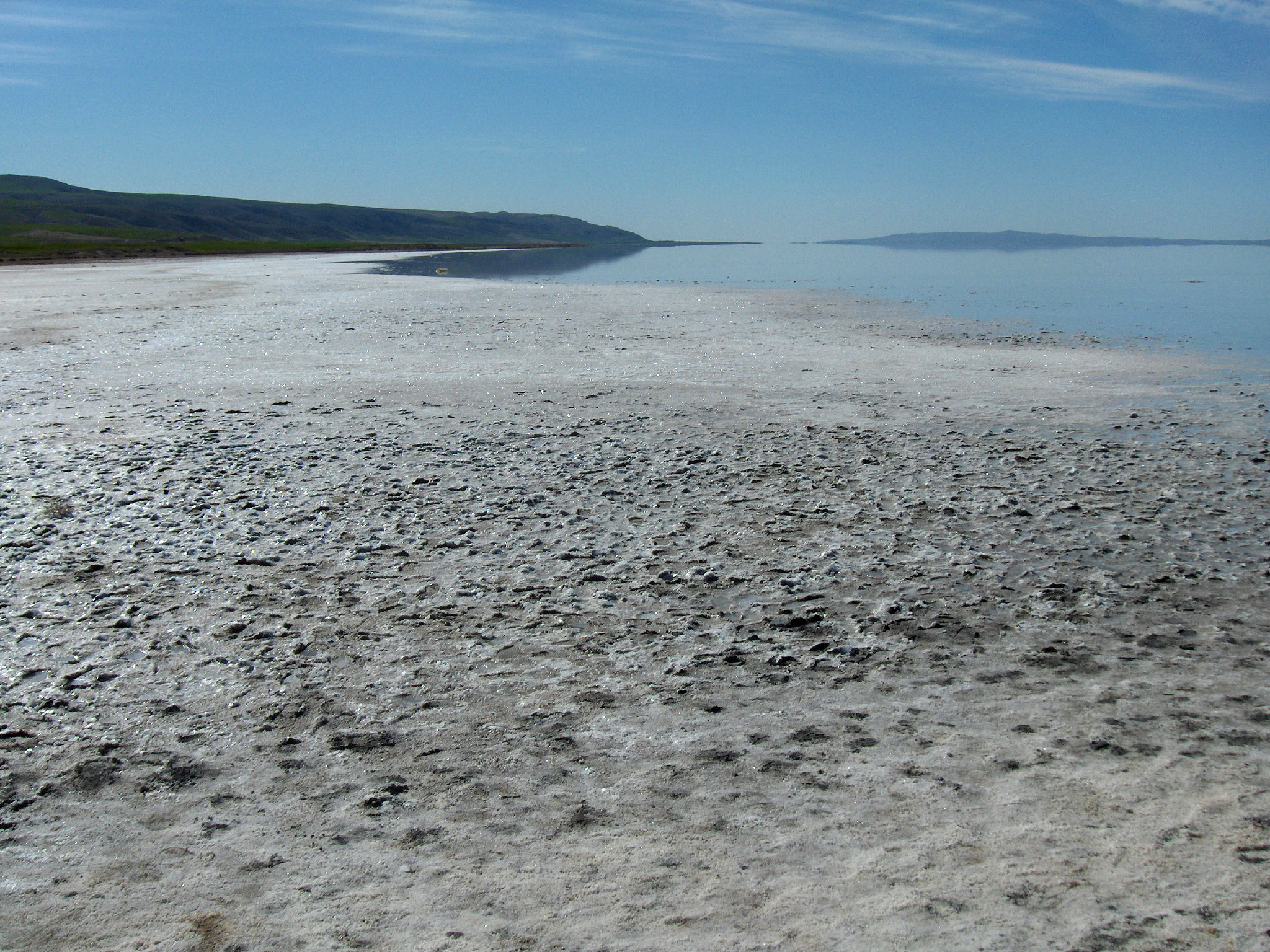
Lake Tuz

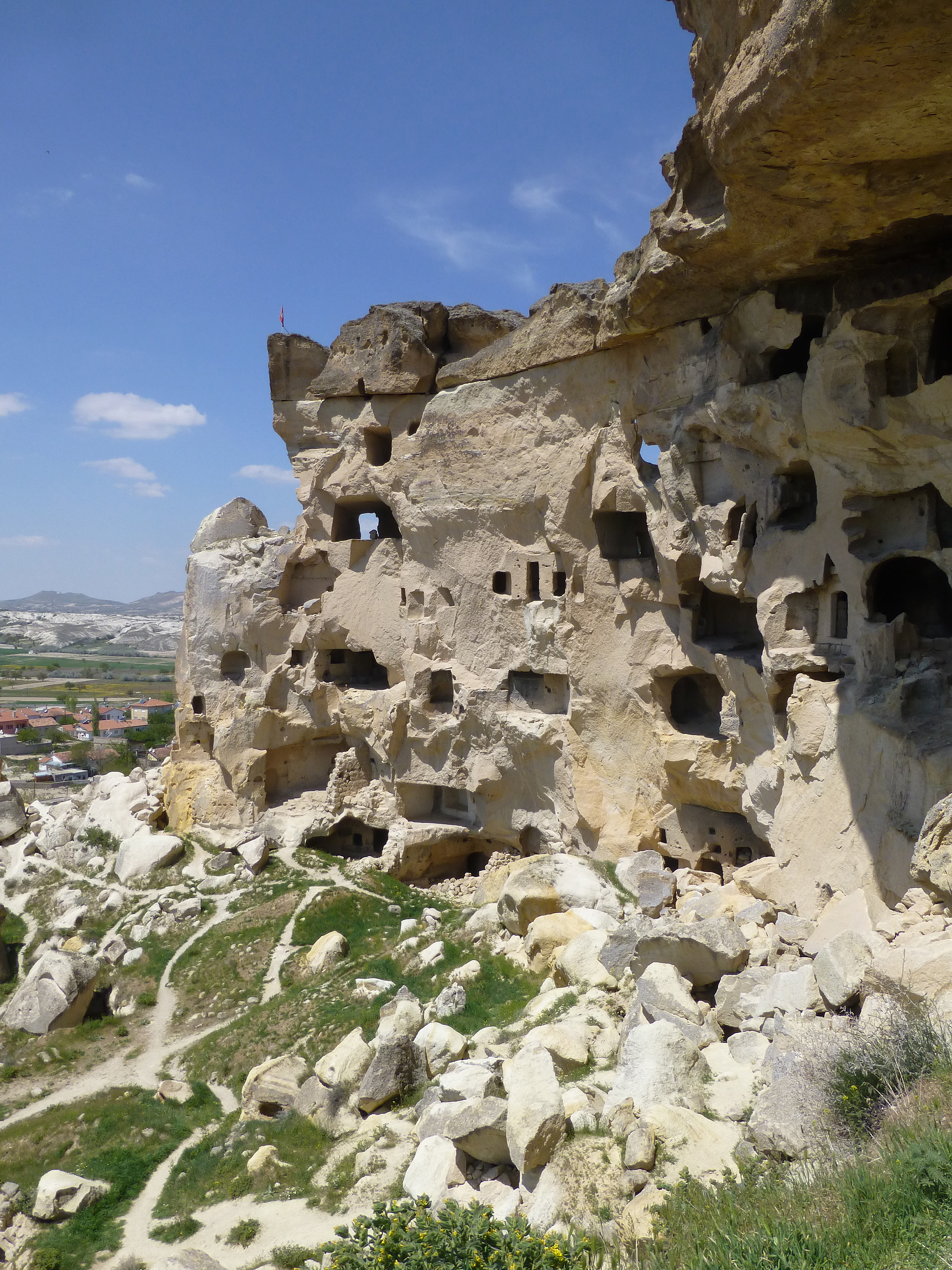
Çavuşin

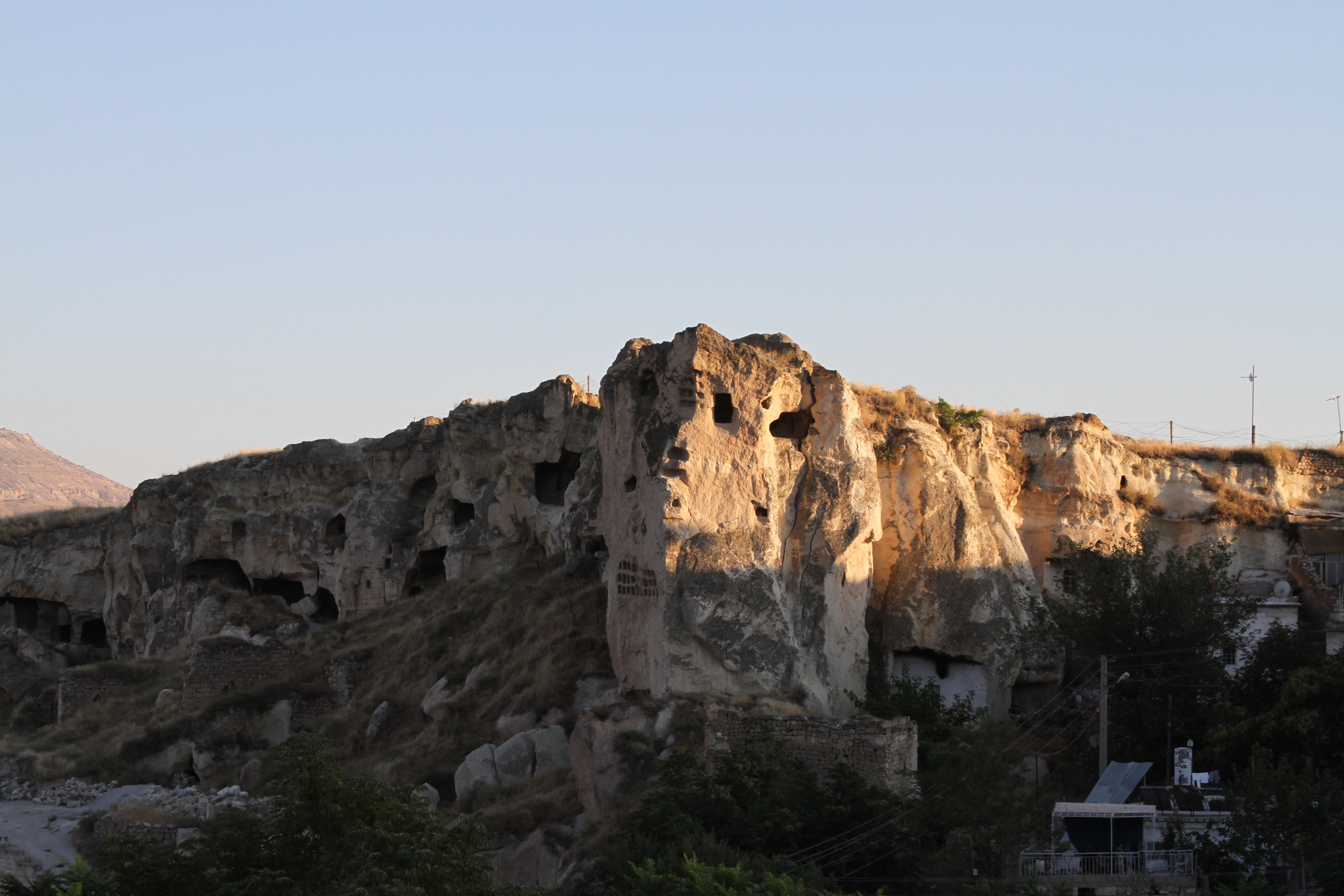
Ürgüp

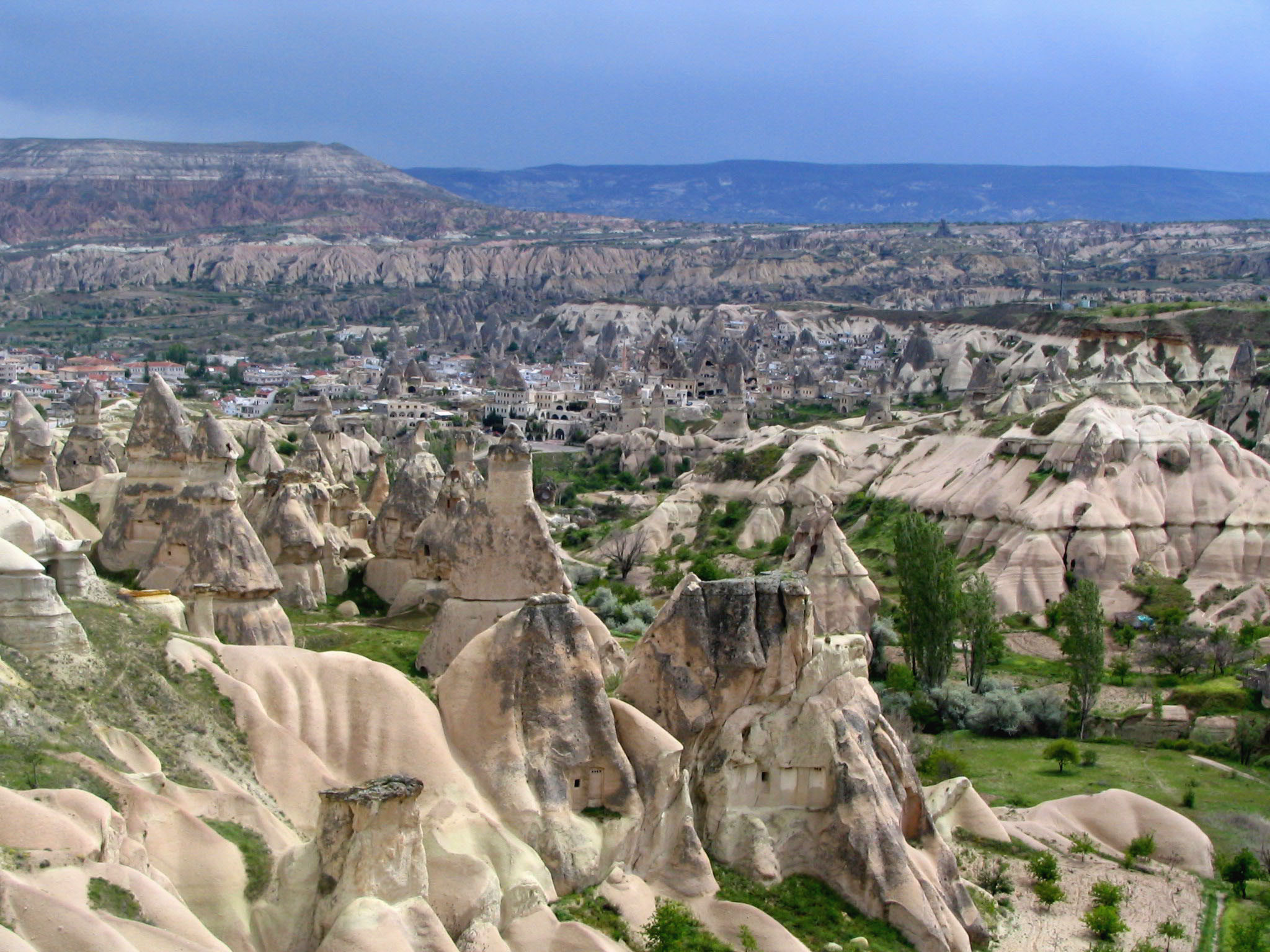
Göreme Valley
