= İznik Ultramarathon =

Trail running event in Turkey

Coordinates: 40°25′45″N 29°43′11″E

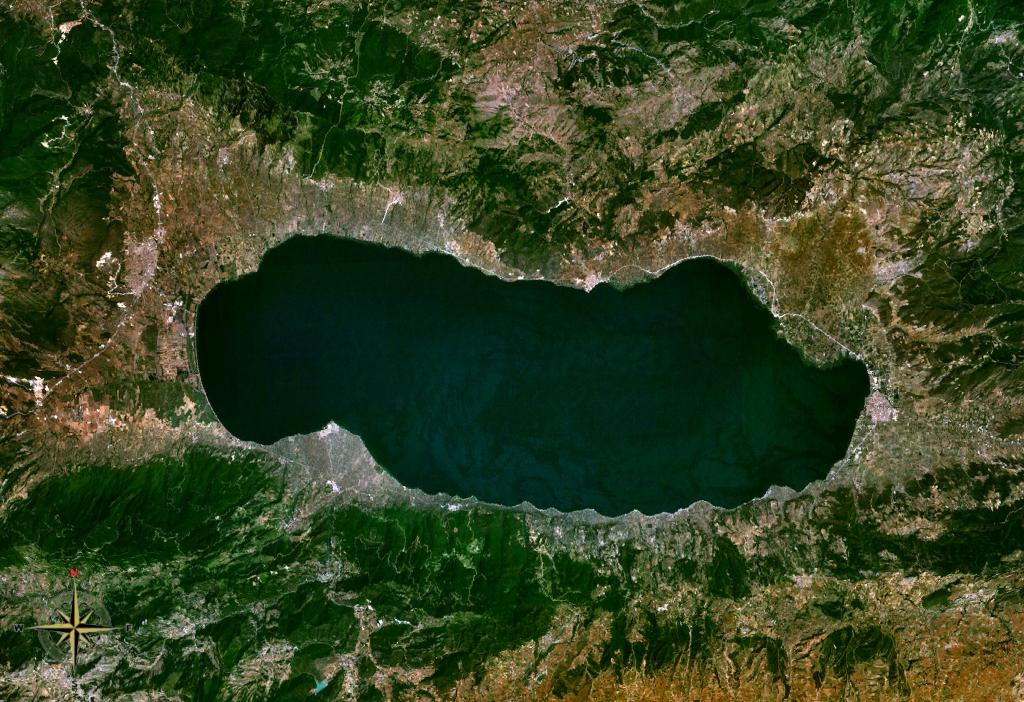
- Lake İznik from space.
- Date: April
- Location: İznik, Bursa Province, Turkey
- Event type: Road
- Distance: İznik Ultra 133 km (83 mi); Orhangazi Ultra 80 km (50 mi); İznik Mountain Marathon 42 km (26 mi); İznik 10k 10 km (6.2 mi)
- Established: 14 April 2012; 14 years ago

Location of the start-finish line of İznik Ultramarathon in Turkey

İznik Ultramarathon, shortly İznik Ultra, is an international trail running ultramarathon event that takes place at İznik town of Bursa Province in northwestern Turkey. It was established in 2012 with the first race held on 14-15 April. Lasting two days, the race is Turkey's longest single-stage athletic event.

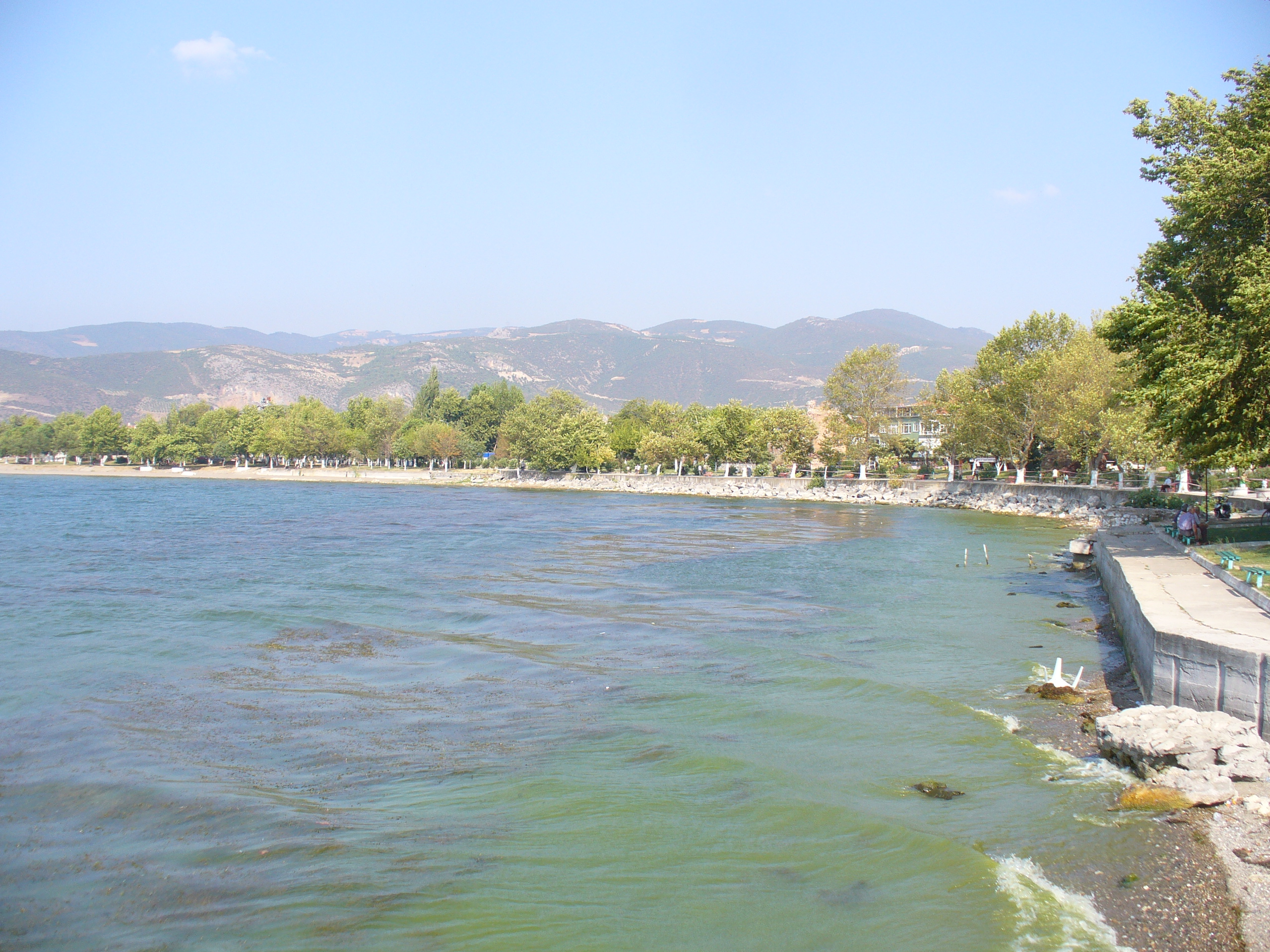
Lake İznik.

The course is a loop around the Lake Iznik with a distance of 133 km (83 mi) and a total elevation gain of 2,248 m (7,375 ft). İznik Ultra consists of the part races as the 80k "Orhangazi Ultra", the 42k "İznik Mountain Marathon" and additionally a city fun run "İznik 10k". The winners are bestowed with medals specially made out of İznik pottery, which made the town famous in the Ottoman Empire era.

In 2013, 250 athletes from 17 nations participated at the event. The race for 2014 is scheduled on 19-20 April.

== İznik Ultra ==
Lake İznik is located northeast of Bursa, and the historic city of İznik (formerly Nicaea) is situated at the eastern shore of the lake. The trail running race starts at the square in front of Hagia Sophia Museum (Turkish: İznik Ayasofya Camii) in the town center, and leaves İznik on its south through Yenişehir Gate (Turkish: Yenişehir Kapısı). Running on state and country roads between villages as control points, the route continues along the mountainous southern coast of İznik Lake, gaining elevation before and after Derbent at 13 km (8.1 mi). It descends towards Narlıca at 41 km (25 mi), ascends and descends once again before Solöz at 60 km (37 mi). The route after Solöz until the finish line is almost flat with an elevation difference not exceeding about 100 m (330 ft). Örnekköy village is the westernmost point of the route at 75 km (47 mi). From there on, the route follows north of the lake. After the villages Ilıca at 95 km (59 mi), Boyalica at 103 km (64 mi) and Dikilitaş at 120 km (75 mi), it arrives in İznik at the same place it had started, passing through İstanbul Gate (İstanbul Kapı) in the north of the town. Qualification time is limited by 25 hours. İznik Ultra is accredited for giving three points to the North Face Ultra-Trail du Mont-Blanc.

== Orhangazi Ultra ==
Orhangazi Ultra is the 80 km (50 mi) part of İznik Ultra that ends in Örnekköy with an elevation gain of 1,850 m (6,070 ft). The time limit is 13 hours. The event gives two points to the North Face Ultra-Trail du Mont-Blanc.

== İznik Mountain Marathon ==
İznik Mountain Marathon is the 42 km (26 mi) part of İznik Ultra that ends in Narlıca with an elevation gain of 1,050 m (3,440 ft). Time limit is 8 hours.

== İznik 10k ==
İznik 10k is a (10 km (6.2 mi) fun run held in the town and partly along the lake shore on the second day of the İznik Ultra event. The race starts in the square before the Hagia Sophia Museum, runs through the city streets and along the historic city walls. After continuing along the lake shore, the route enters the city again and ends in the town square. The major part of the route is paved with asphalt or cobblestone while only 10% of it is unpaved as dirt road or gravel road.

== Winners ==
Key: Course record

Year	Distance	Men's winner	Time (h:m:s)	Women's winner	Time (h:m:s)
2012	126k	(Turkey) Mahmut Yavuz	15:41:03	(Russia) Elena Polyakova	18:51:27
2012	60k	(United Kingdom) Ian Corless	6:01:35	(Turkey) Tuğba Merve Çavdar	7:24:45
2012	10k	(Turkey) Sefa Yaman	0:37:08	(Turkey) Zühal Tümay	0:50:26
2013	130k	(Turkey) Mahmut Yavuz	13:52:06	(Russia) Elena Polyakova	15:00:40
2013	80k	(Turkey) Tanzer Dursun	8:13:54	(United States) Amy Sproston	7:12:51
2013	42k Mountain	(Turkey) Akın Yeniçeli	3:39:15	(Turkey) Şengül Üzen	4:31:13
2013	10k	(Turkey) Akın Yeniçeli	0:35:01	(Northern Cyprus) Eileen Aydınlar	0:46:29
2014	130k	(United Kingdom) Marcus Scotney	12:53:59	(Turkey) Bakiye Duran	19:09:39
2014	80k	(Turkey) Aykut Çelikbaş	7:41:34	(United Kingdom) Jo Meek	6:52:17
2014	42k Mountain	(United Kingdom) Robbie Britton	3:08:19	(Russia) Elena Polyakova	3:47:26
2014	10k	(United Kingdom) Robbie Britton	0:34:28	(United Kingdom) Tracy Dean	0:43:17

== Notable participants ==
- Amy Sproston, 2012 World champion in 100k.
