= Ákos Kónya =

Hungarian ultramarathon runner

Ákos Kónya (born 1974) is a Hungarian ultramarathon runner from Oceanside, California.

== Early life ==
While growing up in Kecskemét, Hungary, Kónya began running at age 12. He ran track in high school and ran his first marathon at age 15. He has run a marathon in under 2:30, 11 minutes off qualifying for the Olympic Trials.

While attending a teacher's college, Kónya injured his knee playing basketball. He underwent surgery for Patellar tendinitis in 2001, which forced him to stop running for two years. When he began running again, he could not run as fast. This prompted him to run longer distance races in which speed was not as important as endurance.

He has worked on a cruise ship and at hotels. In 2001, he emigrated to the United States as part of a foreign exchange program at Yellowstone National Park. He later moved to Oceanside, California and now works as a restaurant manager at Ruby's Diner.

== Ultrarunning career ==
Although he began running ultramarathons in 2003, Kónya emerged from complete obscurity in the 2006 Badwater Ultramarathon, one of the world's most difficult races. After leading for much of the race at record pace, his endurance was strained by a lack of sleep and he eventually finished second to Scott Jurek. Although the temperature was above 120 °F (49 °C) during the race, he claims that the heat did not bother him. He also finished second at Badwater in 2007 and 2008, though his performance was hindered by a hamstring injury in 2008. In 2009 he did not compete at Badwater, but instead served on the crew for the youngest ever Badwater finisher.

He won the Lean Horse Ultramarathon 100 mile race in 2007 and 2009, setting the course record in 2007.

In November 2007 Kónya placed first at the U.S. 24 Hour National Championship race, running 146.25 miles (235.37 km). He was not declared the national champion however, because he was not a U.S. Citizen.

Kónya runs shorter distances as well, and finished a close second in the Surf City USA Marathon in February 2010.
