= Elena Polyakova =

Russian ultramarathon runner

Personal information
- Nationality: Russian
- Born: Елена Полякова; 22 March 1981 (age 44) Znamensk, Astrakhan Oblast, Russia

Sport
- Country: Russia
- Sport: Ultramarathon

Elena Polyakova (Russian: Елена Полякова; born 22 March 1981) is a Russian female ultramarathon runner, and formerly a female bodybuilder.

Elena Polyakova was born on 22 March 1981 in Znamensk, Astrakhan Oblast, a closed city in Russia. She performed sports in athletics and body building, and won a number of cups. A travel agent from profession, she seasonally was working in Antalya, Turkey since 2005. In September 2011, she met Alper Dalkılıç, a Turkish ultra runner during the 2011 Lycian Way Ultramarathon in southern Turkey. One month after she returned home, she decided to move to Turkey. Since then, she has lived in Istanbul.

== Athletics career ==
Polyakova participated at Istanbul Marathon in 2007 and 2008, without success. From the 2011 Lycian Way Ultramarathon on including, she won all the women's category titles of ultramarathon events held in Turkey.

At the 250 km (160 mi) long ultramarathon of 2012 Atacama Crossing in Chile, which is the first of the 4 Deserts endurance footrace series, she placed fourth. In 2013, Polyakova won the 80 km (50 mi) Two Castles and an Abbey Trail Ultra in Cyprus. The same year, she finished the most difficult footrace of Europe, the 168 km (104 mi) of Ultra-Trail du Mont-Blanc in the Alps, at rank thirteen.

== Achievements ==
Year	Competition	Distance	Time (h:m:s)	Rank (women's cat)
2007	(Turkey) Istanbul Marathon	42 km (26 mi)	3:17:37	25th
2008	(Turkey) Istanbul Marathon	42 km (26 mi)	3:20:40	13th
2011	(Turkey) Lycian Way Ultramarathon	240 km (150 mi)	39:25:20	1st
2012	(Chile) Atacama Crossing	250 km (160 mi)	44:02:39	4th
2012	(Turkey) İznik Ultramarathon	126 km (78 mi)	18:51:27	1st
2012	(Turkey) Çekmeköy Ultra Trail	60 km (37 mi)	8:29:49	1st
2012	(Turkey) Runfire Cappadocia Ultramarathon	240 km (150 mi)	33:51:52	1st
2012	(Turkey) Lycian Way Ultramarathon	240 km (150 mi)	38:43:57	1st
2013	(Turkey) İznik Ultramarathon	130 km (81 mi)	15:00:40	1st
2013	(Turkey) Çekmeköy Ultra Trail	60 km (37 mi)	6:38:00	1st
2013	(Cyprus) Two Castles and an Abbey Trail Ultra	80 km (50 mi)	10:31:48	1st
2013	(Turkey) DASK Anatolian Mountain Marathon	70–90 km (43–56 mi)		1st with Deniz Hamdi Dural
2013	(Turkey) Runfire Cappadocia Ultramarathon	245 km (152 mi)	29:15:30	1st
2013	(France) (Switzerland) (Italy) Ultra-Trail du Mont-Blanc	168 km (104 mi)	38:41:33	13th
2013	(Turkey) Intersport Run	11 km (6.8 mi)	50:09	9th
2013	(Turkey) Salomon Trail Run	15 km (9.3 mi)	1:10:23	2nd
