= Yukon Arctic Ultra =

Series of races in Yukon, Canada

The Yukon Arctic Ultra is a series of non-stop multiday races that take place concurrently beginning in Whitehorse, Yukon at the beginning of February each year. The marathon, 100/300/430 mile races follow the course of the Yukon Quest. The longer races have three disciplines: mountain bike, xc-skis or foot. The race is billed as the toughest ultramarathon in the world where the temperatures can drop to –40 °C (–40 °F) plus wind chill. The race was founded in 2003 and has run every year since except 2010.

The race is self-provisioned. While the organizers provide trail guides, there is a real risk of frostbite and amputations.

== See also ==
- List of ultramarathons
