= Lean Horse Ultramarathon =

Annual competitive race held in South Dakota

The Lean Horse Ultramarathon is run in August every year in the Black Hills of South Dakota. It was first run in 2005. It features a 100-mile (160 km) race, a 50-mile (80 km) race, and a 50-kilometre (31 mi) race. Most of the course is on the George S. Mickelson Trail. It was the 33rd sanctioned 100-mile race in the United States and is known as one of the easiest hundred mile races in the country.

The course record of 15 hours and 24 minutes for the 100-mile race was set in 2007 by Akos Konya. Howard Nippert holds the course record for the 50-mile race in 6 hours, 6 minutes and 10 seconds.
