= Addo Elephant Trail Run =

The Addo Elephant Trail Run is a 25-, 50- and 100-mile event that takes place in and around the Addo Elephant National Park which is situated 75 kilometres (47 mi) north of the South African coastal city of Port Elizabeth.

The trail consists mainly of tracks within the national park itself, with some stretches on gravel roads. Due to the remoteness and inaccessibility of the trail, the Addo Elephant Trail Runs differ substantially from other organized runs. Adequate mental and physical preparation is of utmost importance to each runner, because the mountains and valleys, although beautiful, are relentless in their challenge and unforgiving to the ill prepared.

The 25- and 50-mile distances start near Kirkwood, and winds its way through valleys and over the Zuurberg Mountains to finish at the Addo Elephant Park Main Rest Camp. The 100-mile distance starts at the Addo Elephant Park Main Rest Camp and finishes at the Zuurberg Lodge.

== Results ==
Previous winners
Year	Distance	Time (men)	Men's winner	Time (women)	Women's champion
2022	100 miles	21:11:11	Gabriel Kriel	25:05:01	Lodelia Odendaal
2022	70 miles	07:11:11	David Ashworth	07:43:50	Catherine Williamson
2018	100 miles	19:48:09	Antoine Guillon	32:15:39	Rene Vollgraaff
2018	76 km	07:33:40	Stewart Chaperon	08:07:18	Nicolette Griffioen
2018	44 km	03:44:02	Mvuyisi Gcogco	04:28:34	Melissa Van Rensburg
2017	100 miles	20:33:08	Tom Adams	24:00:57	Naomi Brand
2017	76 km	06:54:19	Ryan Sandes	09:39:19	Suzette Von Broembsen
2017	44 km	03:54:00	Mvuyisi Gcogco	04:39:51	Daneil Feldmann
2016	100 miles	21:45:08	Bennie Roux	29:25:34	Linda Doke
2016	76 km	07:34:33	Nic De Beer	09:13:13	Nicky Booyens
2016	44 km	03:54:23	Mvuyisi Gcogco	04:17:14	Kerry-Ann Marshall

== See also ==
- Kalahari Augrabies Extreme Marathon
- Rhodes Trail Run
