= Marlborough Downs Challenge =

Ultramarathon in Wiltshire, England

The Marlborough Downs Challenge is an ultramarathon across the Marlborough Downs in Wiltshire, England. The race is nearly all on footpaths. It starts and finishes in Marlborough and the course goes as far as Devizes. The distance is 53 km (33 mi). The race is organised by Marlborough Running Club. A 32 km (20 mi) event is organised on the same day. A number of walkers participate in the events.

The 2019 event took place on 11 May and was the 17th running of the event.

== Results ==
The winners of some recent races are given below.

Year	First Man	Time	Men	First Woman	Time	Women	Finishers
1999	Allen Smalls	4:58:11	29	Katherine Reed	5:44:18	5	34
2000	?			?			
2001	Cancelled			Cancelled			
2002	Mike Bradley	4:45:14	33	Ramona Thevenet-Smith	5:48:38	7	40
2003	Brian Cole	4:52:32	38?	Isobel Partridge & Siri Terjesen	5:31:45	20?	58
2004	Andy Eccles	4:08:34	54?	Susan Sleath	5:07:06	24?	78
2005	Brian Cole	4:06:46	62?	Susan Sleath	4:57:41	21?	83
2006	Brian Cole	4:11:44	49?	Susan Bruce	5:00:53	14?	63
2010	Allen Smalls	3:51:33	103	Kate Bailey	4:20:13	28	131
