= 7in7on7 =

Marathon in Antarctica

7in7on7 was the name given to the world's first attempt to run 7 ultramarathons (50 km) in 7 consecutive days on all 7 continents, starting in Antarctica.

4 runners—Oliver Dudley, Jack Jones, Stuart Kershaw and Chris Cuddihy—set off from Antarctica on 14 March 2009 for the first 50 km before completing the second race in Punta Arenas, Chile on 15 March, third race in Los Angeles on 16 March, and the fourth race in Sydney on 18 March after losing one calendar day flying across the date line. Stuart Kershaw was hospitalized before the start of the 5th leg in Hong Kong and the three remaining runners reached Johannesburg, where Oliver Dudley caught the same virus as Stuart and was also hospitalized. He was delayed for recovery for 24 hours and went on to finish the final leg in London on 22 March in 8 days and 90 minutes, compared to Chris Cuddihy and Jack Jones's new world record time of 6 days, 23 hours and 35 minutes.
