= Lycian Way Ultramarathon =

Running race

- Date: September
- Location: Lycia, Turkey
- Event type: Multiday trail
- Established: October 11, 2010; 16 years ago
- Course records: men's: 29:29:42 (2011); women's: 38:43:57 (2012)
- Website: http://www.likyayoluultramaratonu.com/EN/

Start and finish locations of Lycian Way Ultramarathon.

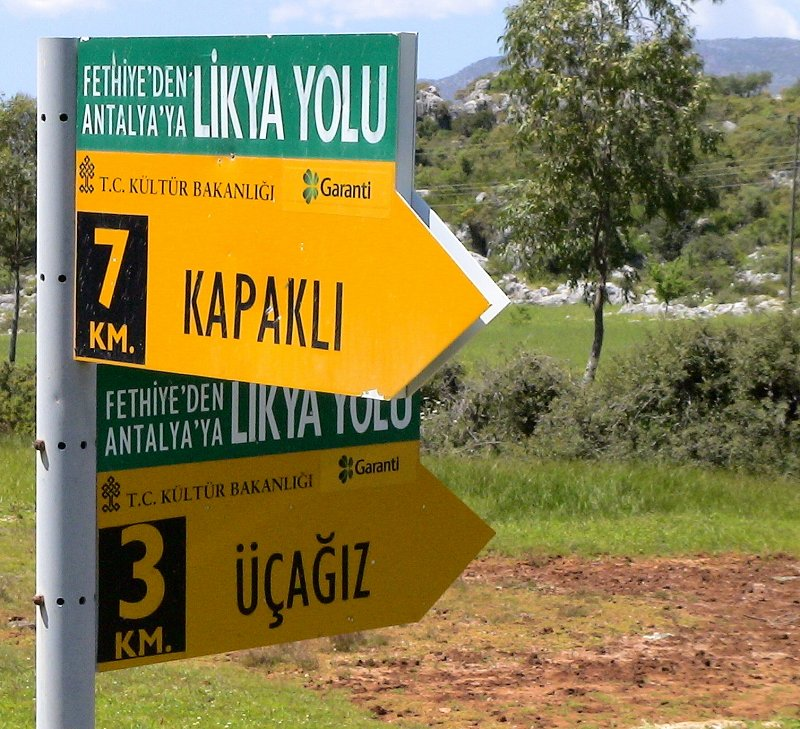
Trail signs on the Lycian Way.

Lycian Way Ultramarathon (Turkish: Likya Yolu Ultramaratonu, shortly LYUM) is an international multiday trail running ultramarathon event that takes place across the ancient Lycian region in southwestern Turkey. The event is run around 220–240 km (140–150 mi) of the 509 km (316 mi) long historical Lycian Way eastwards from Fethiye to Antalya in six days. The elevation of the route varies between sea level and 800 m (2,600 ft). The Lycian Way Ultramarathon was established in 2010 taking place on October 11–17.

Changing ground conditions such as sandy and rocky trails, dirt roads, slippery terrain in conifer forests and steep slopes make the ultramarathon extremely difficult.

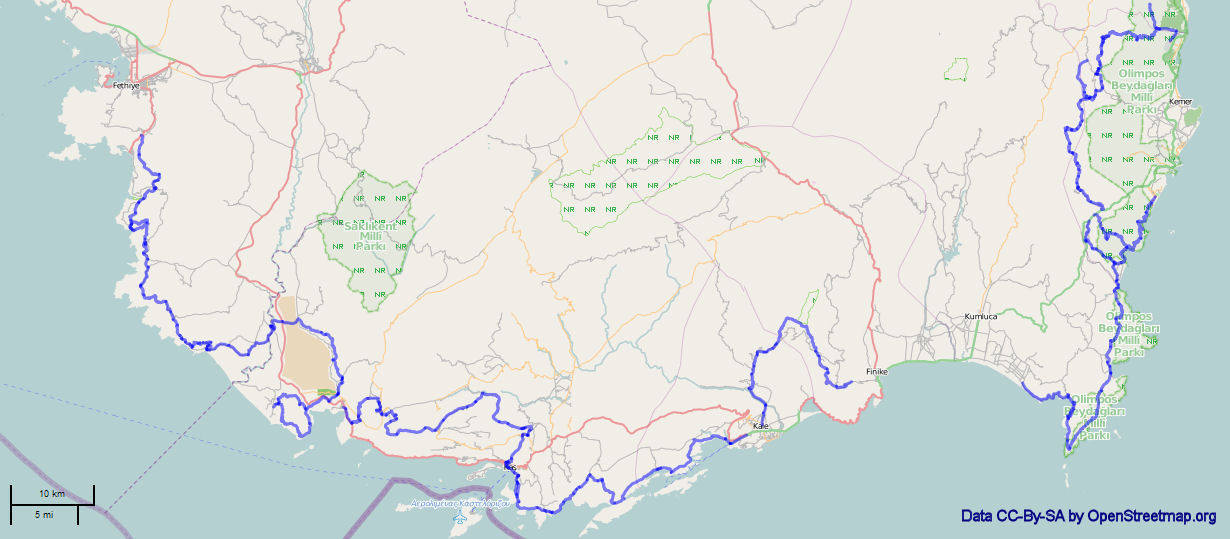
Map of the Lycian Way.

The route starts at Ölüdeniz in Fethiye district of Muğla Province. Following the Turkish Riviera coastline, it passes through Sidyma and then in Antalya Province the places Kaş, Simena, Finike, Olympos and Phaselis. The race ends in Antalya.

The fourth edition of the event in 2013 was cancelled because many foreign ultra runners stayed away or annulled their entry due to perceived risks in connection with the 2013 protests in Turkey and 2012 Syrian–Turkish border clashes. The cancellation caused reaction by local athletes, who had already arranged their training, holiday and airline tickets in accordance with the race term.

== Winners ==
Key: Course record

Year	Men's winner	Time (h:m:s)	Women's winner	Time (h:m:s)
2010	(Turkey) Mustafa Kızıltaş	31:52:11	(Turkey) Aylin Savacı Armador	48:36:57
2011	(Turkey) Mustafa Kızıltaş	29:29:42	(Russia) Elena Polyakova	39:25:20
2012	(Turkey) Faruk Kar	32:35:08	(Russia) Elena Polyakova	38:43:57
2013	Cancelled			
2014				
