= Rhodes Trail Run =

The Rhodes Trail Run is a 52 km trail run that takes place in the southern Drakensberg of South Africa. The event starts in the Victorian-era hamlet of Rhodes at an altitude of 1800 m (5905 ft), and climbs (at one stage the gradient is 1:3) to 2677 m (8782 ft) at Lesotho View (on the Lesotho border) running along the Ben MacDhui snowfields before returning to Rhodes.

There is a limited field on a pre-entry by invitation only basis, with a substitution system. Competitors are given 9 hours to complete the 50 km course (dependent on weather and terrain conditions), with a 4-hour 30 min cut off at the top of what is known as "Mavis's Bank" at the 21 km mark. Temperatures in previous years have dropped to negative 10 degrees Celsius.

== Traditions ==
Local traditions for the race include the second to last table supplying runners with "Prairie Oysters" should they be hungry, and a polar bear club after the race, in the Bell River for those who are brave enough.

== Results ==
2016 Male Winner: Hylton Dunn
2016 Female Winner: Leilani Scheffer

== See also ==
- Kalahari Augrabies Extreme Marathon
- Addo Elephant Trail Run
