= 50K run world record progression =

The following tables show the list of world records in athletics progression in the 50K run, as recognized by World Athletics. The 50K run was introduced as a world record event in July 2021 during the federation's Council meeting in Tokyo.

== World record progression ==
=== Key to tables ===
Awaiting ratification not ratified or later rescinded by World Athletics

=== Men ===
Time	Athlete	Date	Place	Ref
2:42:07	Ketema Negasa (ETH)	23 May 2021	Port Elizabeth, South Africa	
2:40:13	Stephen Mokoka (RSA)	6 March 2022	Gqeberha, South Africa	
2:38:43	CJ Albertson (USA)	8 October 2022	San Francisco, United States	

=== Women ===
==== Women only race ====
Time	Athlete	Date	Place	Ref
3:04:24	Irvette Van Zyl (RSA)	23 May 2021	Port Elizabeth, South Africa	

==== Mixed gender race ====
Time	Athlete	Date	Place	Ref
2:59:54	Desiree Linden (USA)	13 April 2021	Dorena, United States	

== See also ==
- Ultramarathon
- IAU 50 km World Championships
