= Amy Sproston =

American ultramarathon runner

Personal information
- Nationality: American
- Born: February 5, 1974 (age 51) Monmouth, Illinois
- Education: Luther College (Iowa); University of Kansas
- Height: 5 ft 9 in (1.75 m)

Sport
- Sport: Track, Long-distance running
- Event(s): 5000 m, 10,000 m, Marathon

Amy Sproston is an American ultramarathoner from Monmouth, Il.

She won the 2012 IAU 100 km World Championships. Along with this she won a team title for the United States.

Sproston finished second at the 2016 Western States Endurance Run. This was her fourth top-ten finish in the event.
