= Ultramaratón Fuego y Agua =

Produced by Fuego y Agua Events LLC, Ultramaratón Fuego y Agua is an extremely challenging set of foot races on Isla de Ometepe in Nicaragua. The race is composed of four different event options, the 25k, 50k ultramarathon 100k ultramarathon and the Application only 70k obstacle course. The 100k course is a single loop encompassing most of the island and involves the ascent and descent of both volcanoes. The 25k and 50k courses cover part of the 100k course. The course changes every year and is a surprise. Because of the volcanoes, the island holds several microclimates of jungle, dry tropics, tropical beach, and cloud forest. The race course winds through singletrack, dirt road and sand as it passes towns, villages, coffee, cocoa bean and banana plantations, cloud forest, volcanic trail and white sand beaches. The race begins with a pre-race meal the night before and ends with a post-race awards banquet.

== Mission statement ==
The mission of Ultramaratón Fuego y Agua is to bring responsible ecotourism to Isla de Ometepe in the form of challenging and exciting jungle races. Our purpose for the race is to bring an event that gives back to the island without taking anything more than beautiful memories and experiences.

The word ecotourism is a form of tourism that appeals to the ecologically and socially conscious individuals. Generally speaking, ecotourism focuses on volunteering, personal growth, and learning new ways to live on the planet; typically involving travel to destinations where flora, fauna, and cultural heritage are the primary attractions.

By using local guides, local food preparation, locally owned hotels and businesses, to name just a few, Ultramaratón Fuego y Agua hopes to boost the local economy and promote sustainable events on the island. Finishers trophies and winners prizes are locally crafted and produced by island artisans.

Runners and volunteers are encouraged to participate in the annual Isla Limpia Pre-Race Trash Pickup. This organized effort promotes local awareness of the island as a natural resource that must be preserved and maintained.

Portions of race entry costs and donations are used to host Calzado Kids Run, a children’s race for local islanders. The children’s race promotes running, fitness, healthy eating and awareness of the island as an endangered environment that must be cared for. All participants of Calzado Kids Run receive a pair of running shoes donated by supporters and participants of Ultramaratón Fuego y Agua.
