= CJ Albertson =

American long-distance runner (born 1993)

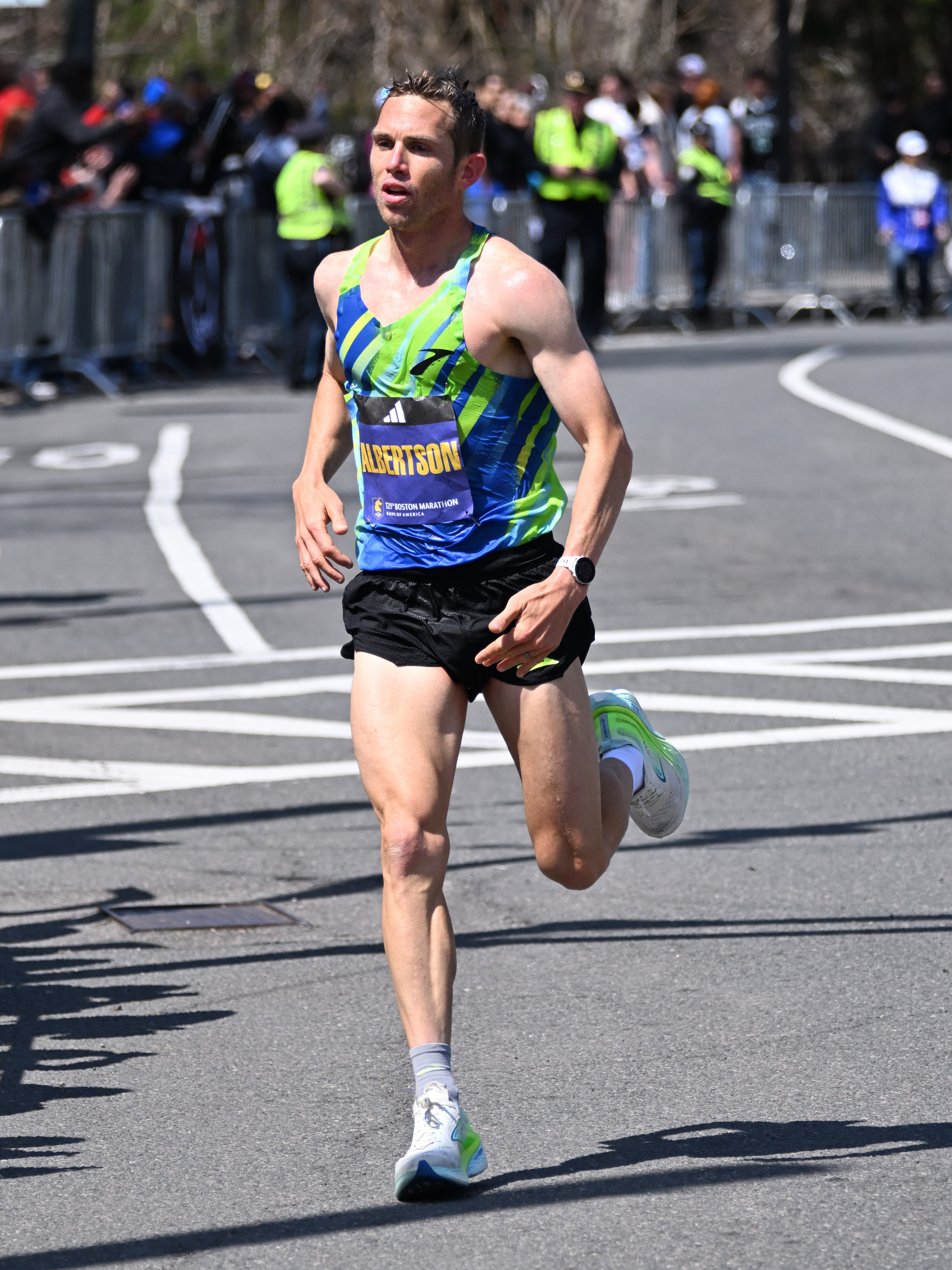
- Albertson at the 2025 Boston Marathon

Personal information
- Full name: Clayton Jordan Albertson
- Nationality: American
- Born: October 11, 1993 (age 33) Fresno, California
- Home town: Fresno, California

Sport
- Country: United States
- Sport: Road running Ultramarathons; Cross country running Track and field
- Events: 1500m, 3000m steeplechase, 5000m, 10,000m, marathon, 50 kilometres
- University team: Arizona State Sun Devils
- Club: Brooks Running
- Turned pro: October 2022

Clayton Jordan Albertson (born October 11, 1993) is an American long-distance runner, who competes for Brooks Running. He is the world record holder in the 50-kilometer run, with a time of 2:38:43.

== College career ==
Albertson ran collegiately for Arizona State. There he broke the school's indoor 5000m record, had four program top-10 times, and qualified for the 2016 NCAA Championships in the steeplechase.

== Professional career ==
In April 2019, Albertson ran a 2:17:59.4 marathon indoors at the Armory in New York City, setting the world record for the indoor marathon.

In July 2020, Albertson announced via Instagram that he had received a professional running contract with Brooks.

At the 2021 Boston Marathon, he broke away from the pack and led the race for the first 20 miles before fading to 10th overall. He said later in an interview, "I wasn't running hard; I'm just really good at downhills."

On October 8, 2022, he broke the world record in the 50 km by running 2:38:43 at the Ruth Anderson Memorial Endurance Run in San Francisco.

== Personal life ==
He is the son of Kent and Cathy Albertson. He has a brother named Michael. In the summer of 2016, he married his Arizona State University teammate, Chelsey.

Albertson is the Head Coach for Clovis Community College Cross Country/Track & Field team. He has also coached at West Ranch High School in Santa Clarita. In his first year, he led both the Men's and Women's teams to State Championships and in his second year, the women's team achieved a third-place finish at the Northern Regional Championships.

== Notable marathon results ==
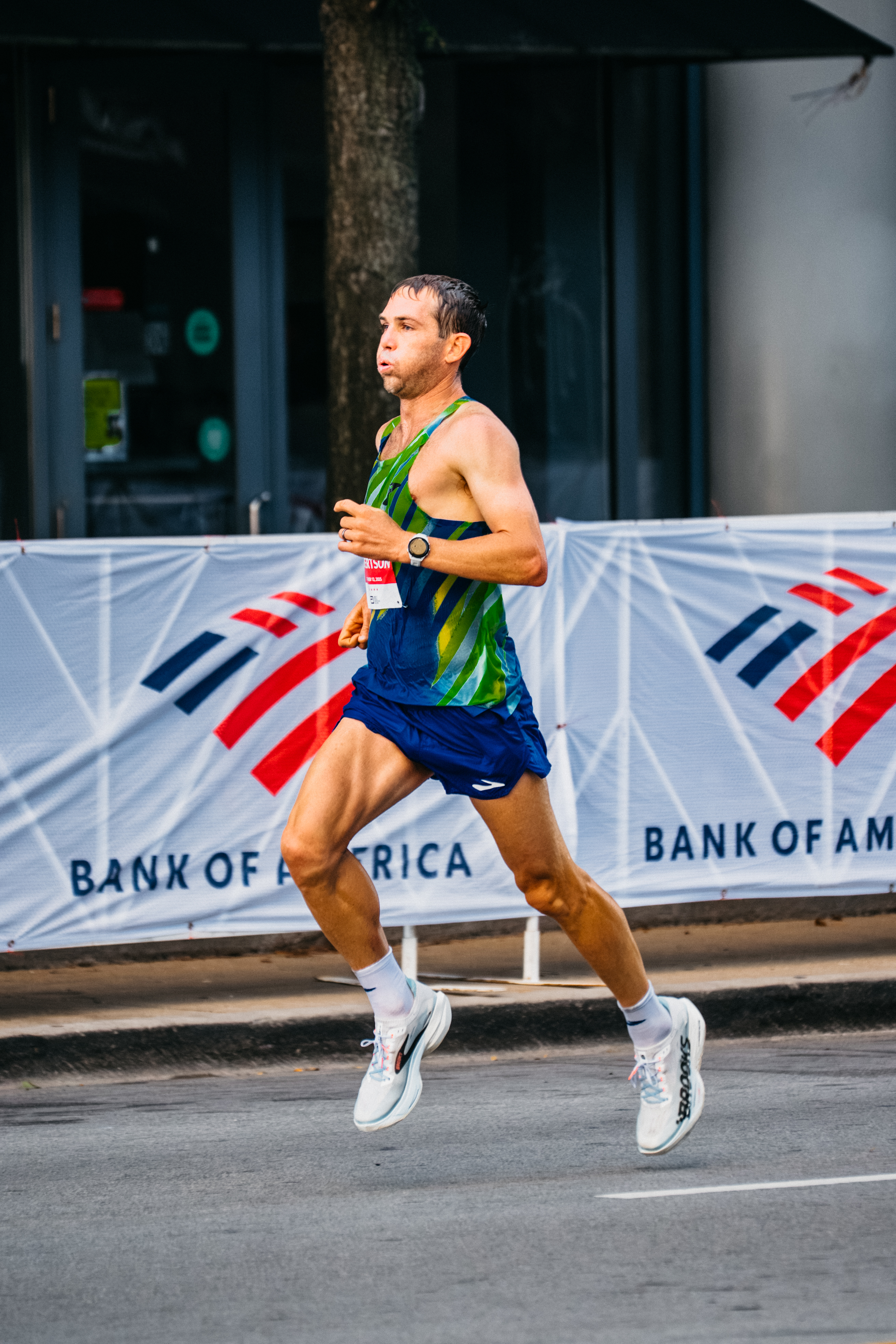
Albertson at the 2025 Chicago Marathon

Results taken from IAAF profile

Year	Race	Place	Time
2020	US Olympic Marathon Trials	7th	2:11:49
2021	Boston Marathon	10th	2:11:44
2022	Boston Marathon	13th	2:10:23
2023	Boston Marathon	12th	2:10:33
2023	California International Marathon	1st	2:11:09
2023	Maraton Baja California	1st	2:11:08
2024	US Olympic Marathon Trials	5th	2:10:07
2024	Boston Marathon	7th	2:09:53
2024	Chicago Marathon	7th	2:08:17
2024	New York City Marathon	10th	2:10:57
2024	California International Marathon	2nd	2:10:06
2025	Boston Marathon	14th	2:10:16
2025	Chicago Marathon	19th	2:10:38
2026	Boston Marathon	27th	2:09:59
