= Spreelauf =

Ultramarathon race in Germany

The Spreelauf is a German ultramarathon race. In six days, runners compete over a total distance of 420 km (261 miles), 10 times the traditional marathon distance. The Spreelauf starts in Spandau (Berlin) and follows the river Spree upstream to one of its three sources in Eibau (Upper Lusatia).

The Spreelauf is organized by Ingo Schulze, well known in the ultramarathon scene as the organizer of the TransEurope-FootRace and the Deutschlandlauf.
