= McNaughton Park Trail Runs =

The McNaughton Park Trail Runs, over distances of 50, 100, 150 and 200 miles (320 km), is an annual ultramarathon running event held in Pekin, Illinois each spring on a rugged, ten-mile (16 km) loop course. All four races are run concurrently. The 150 and 200-mile (320 km) ultra are the only ones of that distance held in Illinois.

The loop course is primarily a single lane footpath, through natural countryside including forests and meadows. Each ten-mile (16 km) loop provides approximately 1,600 feet (490 m) of elevation gain.

A thirty-mile run, part of the event through 2006, was replaced by a 150-mile (240 km) option beginning in 2007.

== Records ==
Men

- 30 Mile (no longer held): Paul Stofko 3:58:18 2005
- 50 Mile: Eric Grossman 6:52:34 2004
- 100 Mile: Karl Meltzer 17:40:13 2007
- 150 Mile: David Goggins 33:36:20 2008

Women

- 30 Mile (no longer held): Ellen Erhardt 4:35:34 2004
- 50 Mile: Jane Moser Cox 9:28:01 2005
- 100 Mile: Tracy Thomas 23:27:26 2006
- 150 Mile: Charlotte Vasarhelyi 46:21:29 2008
