= Rennsteiglauf =

Logo

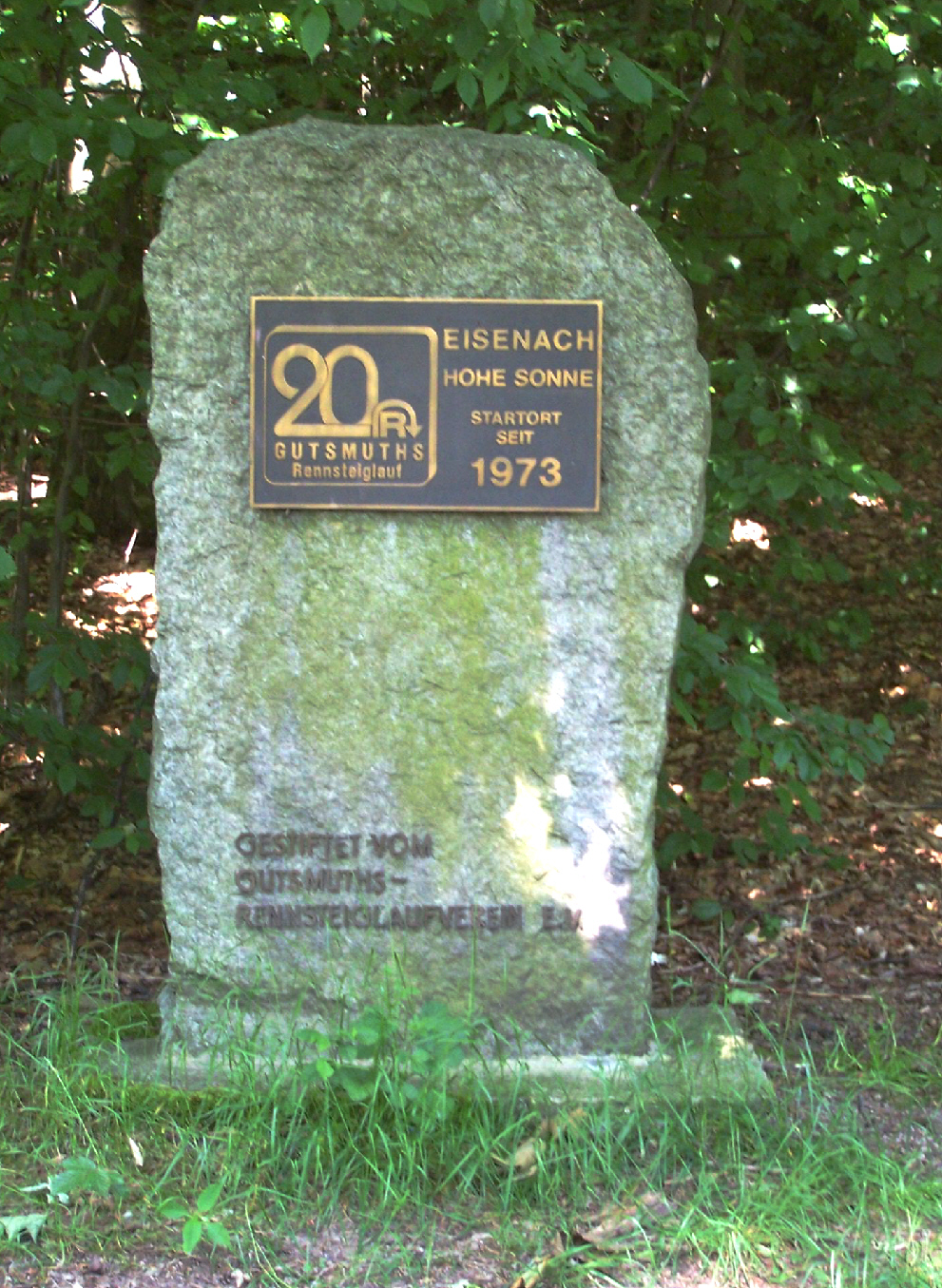
Memorial stone near Eisenach

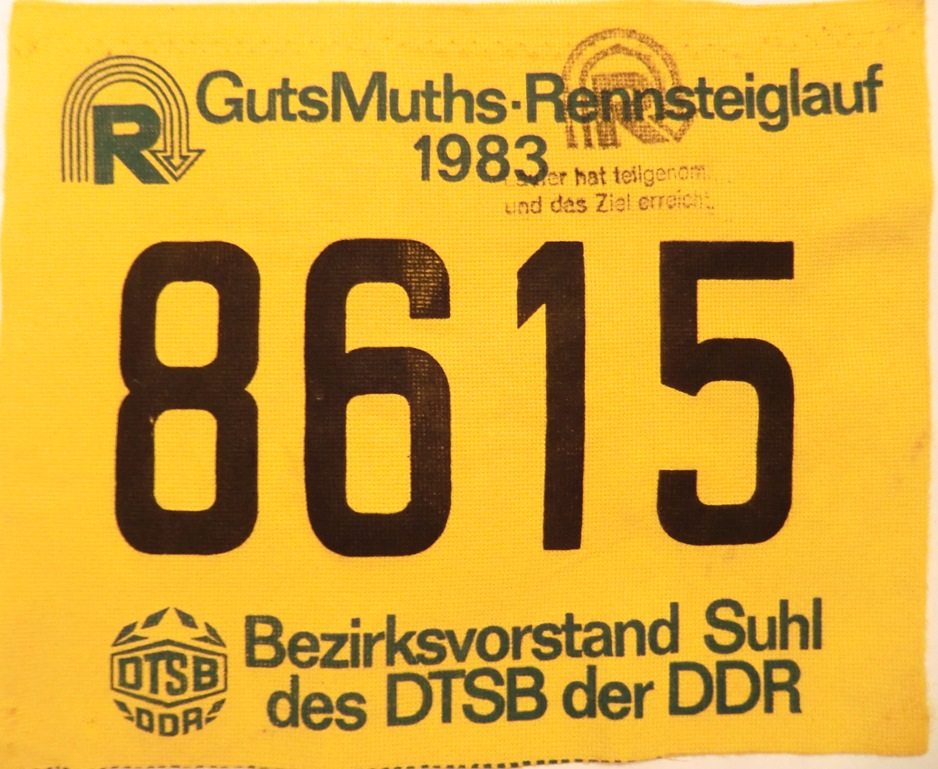
Race number 1983

The Rennsteiglauf (full name GutsMuths-Rennsteiglauf) is a trail running event on the Rennsteig path in the Thuringian Forest.

The longest course is an ultramarathon currently 72.7 km from Eisenach to Schmiedefeld and part of the European Ultramarathon Cup. Other competitions are a marathon (42.195 km) from Neuhaus am Rennweg to Schmiedefeld, a half marathon from Oberhof to Schmiedefeld, short cross country races for people with intellectual disabilities and several hiking courses from 10 to 50 km.

Since 1973, the race has taken place annually in May. It used to be the biggest popular sport event in East Germany, and is still one of the biggest ultramarathons in Europe, attracting more than 10,000 participants, including those for other distances. It was named in honor of sports educator Johann Christoph Friedrich GutsMuths.

== History ==
The first official run took place on 12 May 1973 as the I. 100-km GutsMuths Rennsteiglauf. It was intended to commemorate the pedagogue Johann Christoph Friedrich GutsMuths. The course of almost 100 kilometers led from the Hohen Sonne near Eisenach to Masserberg. The four participants Hans-Georg Kremer, Hans-Joachim Römhild, Jens Wötzel and Wolf-Dieter Wolfram ran without any competitive intention and reached the finish together after 9:55 hours. The following year, the event was repeated on May 17 on a route of 82 kilometers - from Heuberghaus to Neuhaus. Eight of twelve participants reached the finish line after 10:35 hours: G. Clausnitzer, K. Gottert, R. Knoch, H.-G. Kremer, H.-J. Römhild, W. Schuck, J. Wötzel, and S. Ziegan.

On 9 May 1975 the Rennsteiglauf was held as a competition for the first time. In addition to the 50-mile run (82 km), a second course of 38 km was set up for women, starting at the youth hostel at Rennsteig station near Schmiedefeld am Rennsteig. Of a total of 974 participants, 811 reached the finish (long course: 692 men, 10 women; short course: 108 women, 1 man). In 1976, the course length was reduced to 75 km, and later to 68 km (1983-1985) and 65 km (1986-1996).

The run was organized on a voluntary basis and initially remained without support from the DTSB board. In the end, the run had cult status. Amateur athletes from all over the GDR made a pilgrimage to the Rennsteiglauf.

Since 1997, the run has had its current length with the start in Eisenach. Since 2017, after a remeasurement, the course length is given as 73.5 km instead of the previous 72.7 km. The shorter run has been started in Neuhaus since 1977, initially over 45 km, 43.5 km and from 2016 over the marathon distance.

Since 1992, the half marathon from Oberhof to Schmiedefeld has been held, and since 1993, children's races have been part of the program. Over time, the Rennsteiglauf developed into the largest popular sports event in the GDR. Today, it is one of the largest popular runs in Germany and has been regularly ranked among the ten most popular runs in Germany by Laufzeit magazine since 1991. Trademarks are the stomach-friendly gruel at the aid stations, the dedicated helpers along the course who are recruited from local sports clubs, and the "dumpling parties" on the eve in the starting towns as well as the runners' parties in the finishing town of Schmiedefeld am Rennsteig.
