= Damsa Dam =

Coordinates: 38.5545°N 34.9218°E

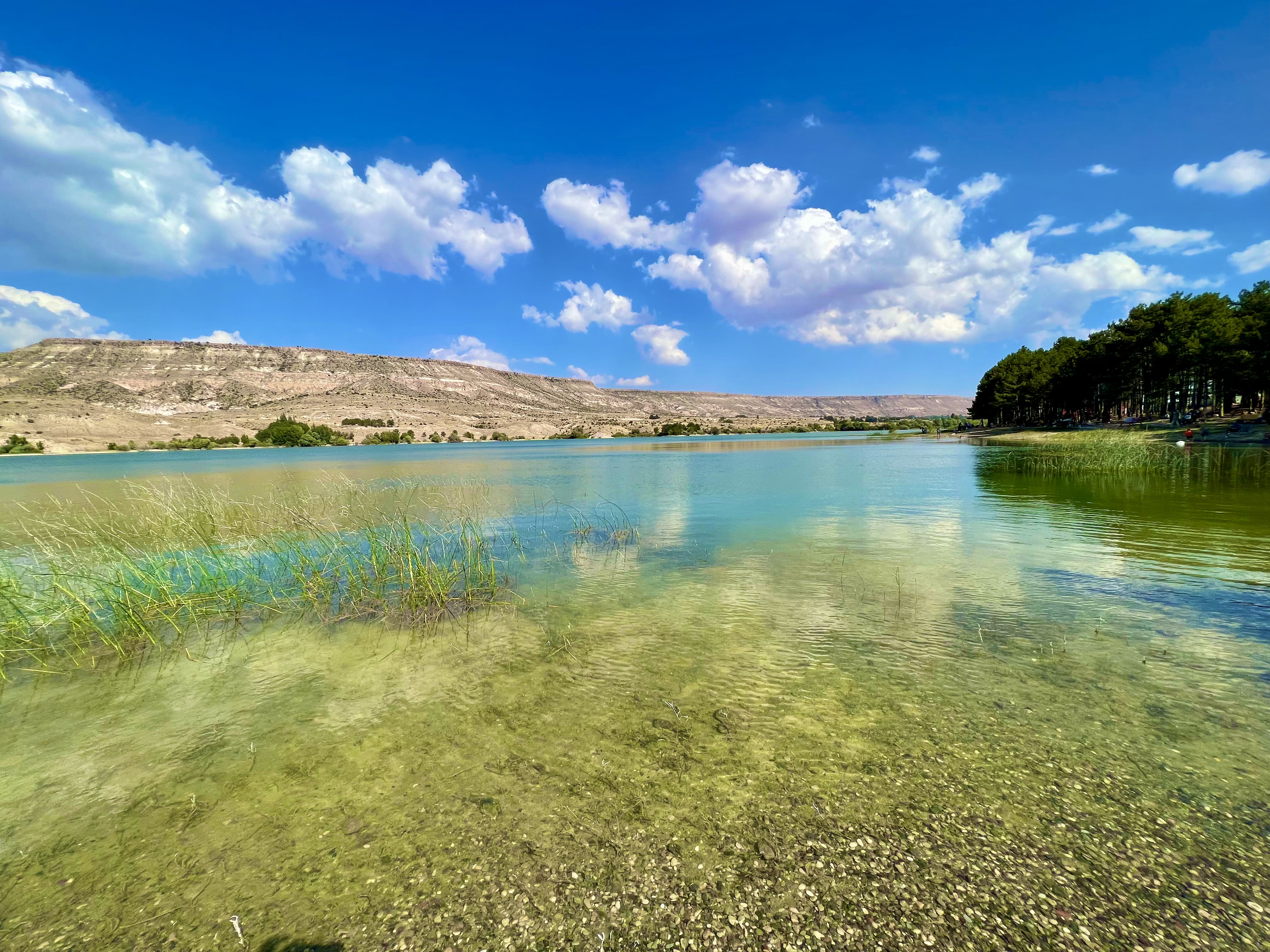
- Location: Ürgüp, Nevşehir, Turkey
- Construction began: 1965
- Opening date: 1971

Dam and spillways
- Height: 34.5 m

Reservoir
- Creates: Damsa Barajı
- Total capacity: 7.017.000 m^{3}
- Surface area: 83.700m^{2}

The Damsa Dam is a dam in Nevşehir, Turkey. Its development was backed by the Turkish State Hydraulic Works. It was built on the stream of the same name (the Damsa Stream), for irrigation purposes. The dam is vitally important to the region, as it is a source of drinking water, and contains a large amount of fish species.

== See also ==
- List of dams and reservoirs in Turkey
