= Kalahari Augrabies Extreme Marathon =

The Kalahari Augrabies Extreme Marathon is a self-sufficient run over seven days, covering an approximate distance of 250 km (155 mi). The event takes place in the Kalahari Desert in the proximity of the Augrabies Falls on the Orange River. The route traverses the Augrabies Falls National Park, private game parks including Khamkirri, Thorntree and Dabaras and many private farmlands. Due to issues the private landowners have had with the organisers the 2014 event took place entirely within the borders of the AFNP and entirely on the Southern side. This contrasting environment with average day temperatures reaching in excess of 40 °C in the summer months and dropping to below 5 °C at night during the winter, presents a daunting challenge to the extreme athlete and determined adventurer alike.

Known as the 'Big Daddy' in the South African running circles, the Kalahari Augrabies Extreme Marathon is event organised by Extreme Marathons, and has its place on the International Calendar of similar trail events. Participants run in the footsteps of the ancient Bushmen, through the fertile vineyards of the Orange River Valley (not in 2015), across rocky outcrops and into the desolate Great Kalahari Desert.

== Course ==
Although the event is advertised as a 250 km, race director Estienne Arndt changes the route every year, and the distance depends on the terrain. The route is only disclosed to the participants at registration, the day before the start of the event.

== Provisions ==
The organisers supply the participants with overnight camps, water, professional medical backup, sports physios, check points at every 8–10 km, and an experienced crew who look after the participants needs.

== Results ==
Past winners
Year	Time (Men)	Men's Champion	Country	Time (Women)	Women's Champion	Country
2017	26:22:00	Leonard, D.	Australia	29:56:00	Combrinck, M.	South Africa
2016	24:42:00	Cloete, D.	South Africa	28:16:00	Combrinck, M.	South Africa
2015	13:55:00	Montague, N.	United Kingdom	19:14:00	Bradley, J.	United Kingdom
2014	21:42:00	Yavuz, M.	Turkey	27:37:00	Doke, L.	South Africa
2013	22:02:00	Rowland, D.	Zimbabwe	28:51:00	Combrinck, M.	South Africa
2012	24:42:00	Dunn, H.	South Africa	38:45:00	Duran, B.	Turkey
2011	27:16:00	Cloete, D.	South Africa	37:27:00	Combrinck, M.	South Africa
2010	23:25:00	Cloete, D.	South Africa	32:41:00	Surrigde, M.	South Africa
2009	22:02:00	Cloete, D.	South Africa	27:06:00	Anderson, M.	United Kingdom
2008	31:36:00	Stuart, A.	Australia	54:49:00.	Simpson, L.	South Africa
2007	29:59:00	Walker, C.	United States	60:18:00	Lambrechts, L.	South Africa
2006	27:23:00	Arnett, B.	South Africa	31:46:00	Anderson, M.	United Kingdom
2005	28:56:00	Arnett, B.	South Africa	31:23:00	Jackenthal, S.	United States
2004	30:57:00	du Preez, T.	South Africa	29:43:00	Simpson, L.	South Africa
2003	24:41:00	Smith, M.	South Africa	35:51:00	Simpson, L.	South Africa
2002	23:57:00	Jurgens, F.	South Africa	39:08:00	Terblance, E.	South Africamemarathons.com Official site]
2001	32:27:00	Kenkroft, W.	United Kingdom	35:17:00	Simpson, L.	South Africa
2000	27:57:00	Jurgens, F.	South Africa	30:35:00	Maclead, N.	United Kingdom

== See also ==
- Addo Elephant Trail Run
- Rhodes Trail Run
