= Laugavegur Ultramarathon =

Ultramarathon race in Iceland

The Laugavegur Ultramarathon is an annual ultramarathon race held on the Laugavegur in Iceland. Running from Landmannalaugar past the Hrafntinnusker mountain and Álftavatn lake, across the Bláfjallakvísl river, through the Emstrur plain and across the Fremri-Emstruá river to Þórsmörk, it covers a total of 55 km.

The race has been held annually since 1997; the 2011 race is scheduled for July 16, 2011.

== Past races ==
=== 2010 ===
The 2010 race was held on July 17, 2010. A total of 279 runners started the race; 267 runners finished, among them 189 men and 78 women. The oldest participant was Jørgen Nautrup of Denmark, who was born in 1942 and finished the race in 7:28:41; the youngest participants were Jón Hinrik Höskuldsson and Guðrún Ólafsdóttir of Iceland, who were born in 1991 and finished the race in 8:46:02 and 7:02:57, respectively.

==== Top ten men ====
№	Athlete	Country	Time (hours:minutes:seconds)	Year of birth	Age group (years)
1	Þorlákur Jónsson	Iceland	4:48:01	1965	40-49
2	Helgi Júlíusson	Iceland	4:49:43	1970	40-49
3	Valur Þórsson	Iceland	4:54:09	1975	30-39
4	Craig J. Mattocks	United Kingdom	4:58:00	1973	30-39
5	Flóki Guðmundsson	Iceland	5:02:35	1976	30-39
6	Friðleifur K Friðleifsson	Iceland	5:07:07	1970	40-49
7	Höskuldur Ólafsson	Iceland	5:07:55	1965	40-49
8	Esko Kranz	Germany	5:14:39	1966	40-49
9	Daníel Smári Guðmundsson	Iceland	5:15:58	1961	40-49
10	Magnús Fjalar Guðmundsson	Iceland	5:16:36	1973	30-39

==== Top ten women ====
№	Athlete	Country	Time (hours:minutes:seconds)	Year of birth	Age group (years)
1	Helen Ólafsdóttir	Iceland	5:21:12	1971	30-39
2	Hólmfríður Vala Svavarsdóttir	Iceland	5:28:10	1974	30-39
3	Sif Jónsdóttir	Iceland	5:49:15	1959	50-59
4	Guðbjörg Margrét Björnsdóttir	Iceland	5:53:51	1973	30-39
5	Christine Buchholz	Iceland	5:54:02	1966	40-49
6	Kate Jenkins	United Kingdom	5:57:46	1974	30-39
7	Jónína Gunnarsdóttir	Iceland	6:08:34	1975	30-39
8	Sigrún Erlendsdóttir	Iceland	6:09:10	1972	30-39
9	Alma María Rögnvaldsdóttir	Iceland	6:11:00	1970	40-49
10	Þuríður Guðmundsdóttir	Iceland	6:15:08	1964	40-49

=== 2009 ===
The 2009 race was held on July 18, 2009. A total of 321 runners started the race; 313 runners finished, among them 238 men and 75 women. The oldest participants were Gunnar J. Geirsson and Baldur Jónsson of Iceland, who were born in 1944 and finished the race in 7:13:38 and 8:05:33, respectively; the youngest participant was Karl Rúnar Martinsson of Iceland, who was born in 1991 finished the race in 6:35:21.

==== Top ten men ====
№	Athlete	Country	Time (hours:minutes:seconds)	Year of birth	Age group (years)
1	Þorbergur Ingi Jónsson	Iceland	4:20:32	1982	18-29
2	Guðmundur Sigurðsson	Iceland	4:54:15	1960	40-49
3	Tuomas Veli Tapio Maisala	Finland	5:03:43	1976	30-39
4	Gauti Höskuldsson	Iceland	5:04:40	1961	40-49
5	Stefán Guðmundsson	Iceland	5:09:22	1986	18-29
6	Jóhann Gylfason	Iceland	5:10:09	1964	40-49
7	Örn Gunnarsson	Iceland	5:13:28	1961	40-49
8	Höskuldur Ólafsson	Iceland	5:13:58	1965	40-49
9	Max Du Jardin	France	5:15:56	1961	40-49
10	Daníel Smári Guðmundsson	Iceland	5:16:53	1961	40-49

==== Top ten women ====
№	Athlete	Country	Time (hours:minutes:seconds)	Year of birth	Age group (years)
1	Hólmfríður Vala Svavarsdóttir	Iceland	5:33:10	1974	30-39
2	Ásdís Söebeck Kristjánsdóttir	Iceland	5:36:15	1967	40-49
3	Rakel Ingólfsdóttir	Iceland	5:49:59	1985	18-29
4	Sif Jónsdóttir	Iceland	5:57:45	1959	50-59
5	Borghildur Valgeirsdóttir	Iceland	6:04:31	1980	18-29
6	Bára Agnes Ketilsdóttir	Iceland	6:04:41	1968	40-49
7	Ásta Ósk Stefánsdóttir	Iceland	6:08:19	1983	18-29
8	Helen Ólafsdóttir	Iceland	6:10:17	1971	30-39
9	Þóra Björg Magnúsdóttir	Iceland	6:10:41	1967	40-49
10	Christine Faye Little	Canada	6:14:38	1968	40-49

=== 2008 ===
The 2008 race was held on July 12, 2008. Nearly 250 runners started the race; 215 runners finished, among them 162 men and 53 women. The oldest participant was Pétur H Blöndal of Iceland, who was born in 1944 and finished the race in 8:10:44 hours; the youngest participant was Elvar Þór Karlsson of Iceland, who was born in 1990 and finished the race in 6:56:27.

==== Top ten men ====
№	Athlete	Country	Time (hours:minutes:seconds)	Year of birth	Age group (years)
1	Daníel Smári Guðmundsson	Iceland	4:54:28	1961	40-49
2	Simon Möller Grimstrup	Denmark	4:59:21	1976	30-39
3	Gauti Höskuldsson	Iceland	4:59:52	1961	40-49
4	Bazin Sylvain	France	5:01:59	1978	30-39
5	Jósep Magnússon	Iceland	5:13:30	1977	30-39
6	Sigurður Þórarinsson	Iceland	5:13:35	1967	40-49
7	Matthew Aram Bedoukian	United States	5:15:26	1980	18-29
8	Stefán Viðar Sigtryggsson	Iceland	5:16:08	1970	18-29
9	Paul Rassam	United States	5:19:26	1972	18-29
10	Sigurjón Sigurbjörnsson	Iceland	5:20:43	1955	50-59

==== Top ten women ====
№	Athlete	Country	Time (hours:minutes:seconds)	Year of birth	Age group (years)
1	Eva Margrét Einarsdóttir	Iceland	5:42:23	1971	30-39
2	Björg Árnadóttir	Iceland	5:43:15	1964	40-49
3	Ásdís Söebeck Kristjánsdóttir	Iceland	5:53:16	1967	40-49
4	Michaela Mccallum	United Kingdom	6:02:19	1966	40-49
5	Hólmfríður Vala Svavarsdóttir	Iceland	6:03:50	1974	30-39
6	Sif Jónsdóttir	Iceland	6:05:42	1959	40-49
7	Þóra Jóhanna Hjaltadóttir	Iceland	6:12:36	1963	40-49
8	Guðbjörg Margrét Björnsdóttir	Iceland	6:14:03	1973	30-39
9	Inga Dagmar Karlsdóttir	Iceland	6:17:38	1972	30-39
10	Katharine Grace Jones	United Kingdom	6:24:18	1961	40-49

== 1997-2010 all-time best results ==
=== All-time top ten men ===
№	Athlete	Country	Time (hours:minutes:seconds)	Year	Year of birth	Age group (years)
1	Þorbergur Ingi Jónsson	Iceland	4:20:32	2009	1982	18-29
2	Charles Hubbard	United States	4:39:21	2001	1961	
3	Andrew Shaw		4:40:52	2004	1961	40-49
4	Þorlákur Jónsson	Iceland	4:48:01	2010	1965	40-49
5	Arnaldur Gylfason	Iceland	4:49:28	1999	1972	18-29
6	Helgi Júlíusson	Iceland	4:49:43	2010	1970	40-49
7	Sveinn Margeirsson	Iceland	4:49:43	2007	1978	30-39
8	Steinar Jens Friðgeirsson	Iceland	4:53:50	2004	1957	40-49
9	Guðmann Elísson	Iceland	4:54:08	2001	1958	40-49
10	Valur Þórsson	Iceland	4:54:09	2010	1975	30-39

=== All-time top ten women ===
№	Athlete	Country	Time (hours:minutes:seconds)	Year	Year of birth	Age group (years)
1	Helen Ólafsdóttir	Iceland	5:21:12	2010	1971	30-39
2	Hólmfríður Vala Svavarsdóttir	Iceland	5:28:10	2010	1974	30-39
3	Bryndís Ernstsdóttir	Iceland	5:31:15	1999	1971	18-29
4	Hólmfríður Vala Svavarsdóttir	Iceland	5:33:10	2009	1974	30-39
5	Ásdís Söebeck Kristjánsdóttir	Iceland	5:36:15	2009	1967	40-49
6	Rannveig Oddsdóttir	Iceland	5:37:42	2007	1973	30-39
7	Rakel Ingólfsdóttir	Iceland	5:41:42	2007	1985	18-29
8	Eva Margrét Einarsdóttir	Iceland	5:42:23	2008	1971	30-39
9	Björg Árnadóttir	Iceland	5:43:15	2008	1964	40-49
10	Irene Gulli	Norway	5:47:35	2002	1957	40-49
