= Biel running days =

100 km ultramarathon in Biel, Switzerland

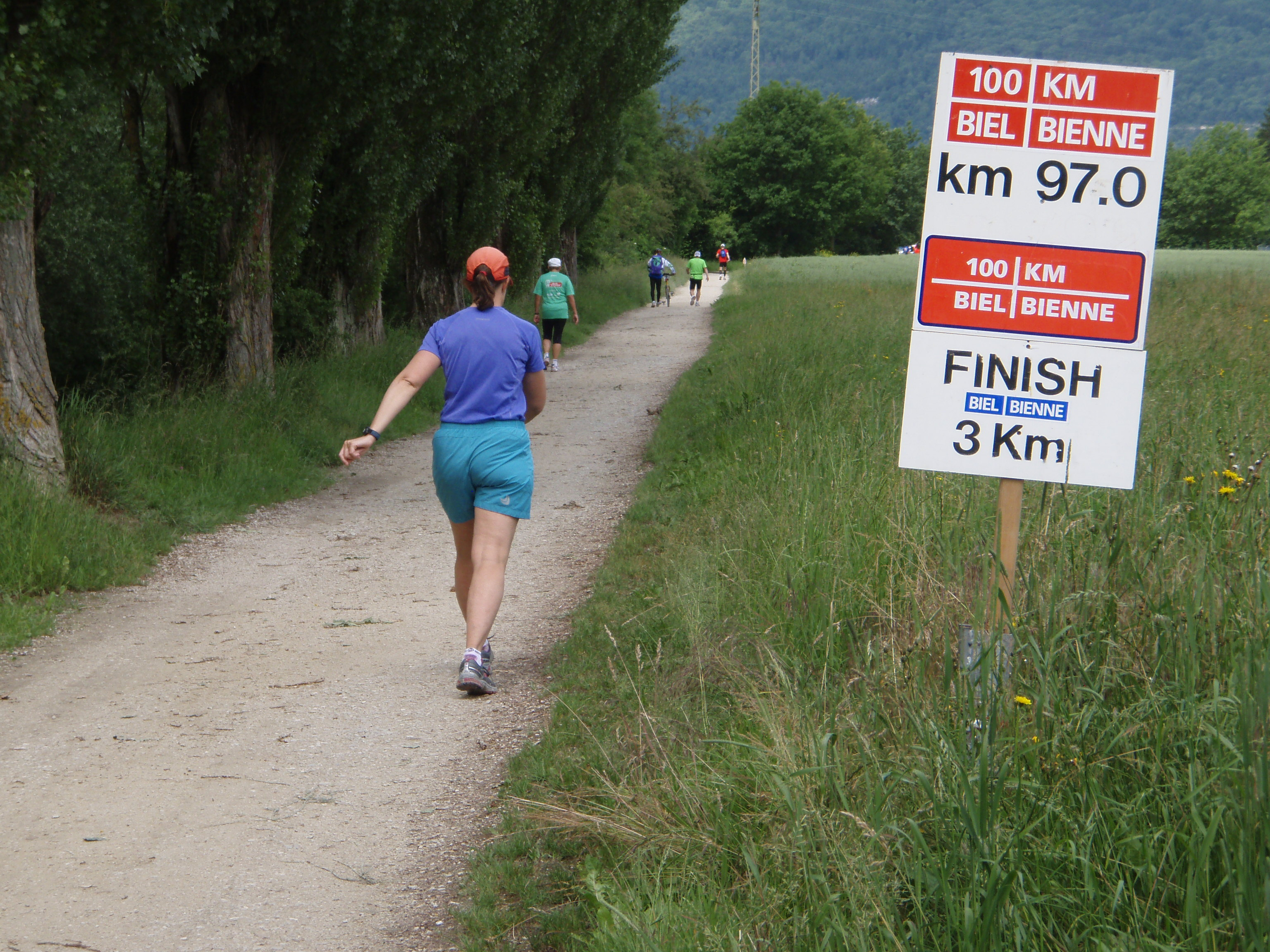
Biel running days

The Biel Running Days (German: Bieler Lauftage; French: Courses de Bienne) takes place in June in Biel/Bienne, Switzerland. Various long-distance track events are involved. The most well known of these is the 100 km Ultra marathon which began in 1959 and is one of the biggest and oldest of its kind (only a 1x100 km loop). You can do the run alone, as a couple or in a Team of 5. The Ultra marathon is also a part of the European Ultramarathon Cup. Along with the 100 km Ultra marathon there are a night marathon and a half marathon taking place.

== Route ==
The start for all distances is at the “Kongresshaus” in Biel/Bienne. The 100 km run starts on Friday night at 10pm and the marathon and half marathon at 10.30pm. The route takes the participants through the cities and towns of Biel/Bienne, Nidau, Port, Bellmund, Jens and Kappelen to Aarberg, a medieval town made more special by the atmosphere created by the thousands of spectators. It is in Aarberg where the half marathon runners cross the finish line. After it is onto Lyss where the Ultra marathon participants may have a supporter on a bike join them. The route then continues onto Grossaffoltern and Scheunenberg then through to the Limpach Valley to Balm bei Messen and Oberramsern which brings the race to kilometre 39. Here in Oberramsern is the finish line for the night marathon. The night marathon route is the same as the 100 km except that the runners have done an additional loop through Biel/Bienne. The 100 km runners start to head South now to Mülchi, Etzelkofen and Jegenstorf where they will soon hit the 50 km mark. They continue onto Kernenried and Kirchberg. Then it is time for the runners and their bike support to separate for 10 km as they bumpy track on the Emme river begins. This part of the route has been nicknamed the Ho Chi Minh trail by previous participants. When the fastest runners reach here it is still dark out and due to branches and big stones on the path most runners will have a head lamp to help them. Just before Gerlafingen the narrow path ends and the bike supporters can rejoin their runner. Over Biberist, Lüterkofen-Ichertswil and Bibern the run continues to Arch and the Aare river. The route then follows the Aare approximately 10 km past Büren. The last kilometres go past Brügg direction Biel/Bienne until the finish line in the city of Biel. Last possible finish time is Saturday at 7pm, 21 hours after the start.

== Statistics ==
=== 100 km Records ===
- Men: 6:37:59 Peter Camenzind (SUI) 1996
- Women 7:37:39 Birgit Lennartz (GER) 1997

All results since 1959: arrs.run

=== Fastest times 2017 ===
- Men: 7:28.41,3 Rolf Thallinger (SUI)
- Women 8:27.44,0 Poltéra Ornella (SUI)

== See also ==
- List of marathon races in Europe
- Swiss Runners
- All results since 1959
