= Krissy Moehl =

American ultramarathon athlete (born 1977)

- Born: Kristin Moehl; October 28, 1977 (age 48); Bow, Washington
- Other names: Kristin Sybrowsky (formerly)
- Occupation: Trail runner
- Spouse: Brandon Sybrowsky (m. 2003 div. 2006)

Kristin "Krissy" Moehl (born October 27, 1977) is an American ultramarathon athlete who specializes in trail running. In 2005, Moehl became the youngest woman to complete the Grand Slam of Ultrarunning, which included a gold medal at the Vermont 100 Mile Endurance Run.

Moehl set the women's record for the Hardrock Hundred Mile Endurance Run in 2007. She holds the women's record for the fastest known run of the 170-mile Tahoe Rim Trail, completing the course in 47 hours 27 minutes.

Moehl has raced in more than 100 ultramarathons and has won several, including the Ultra-Trail du Mont-Blanc in 2003 and 2009, the Wasatch Front 100 Mile Endurance Run in 2004, and the Ultra-Trail Mt. Fuji in 2013.

In 2015, Moehl published Running Your First Ultra a guide book on Ultramarathons.

As of 2017, Moehl had been the race director for the Chuckanut 50k in Fairhaven, Washington for more than 15 years.

== Personal life ==
Moehl was born and raised in Bow, Washington. She ran track in high school and competed at the 800-meter distance at the University of Washington. She was married to distance runner Brandon Sybrowsky from 2003 to 2006. Moehl lives in Bellingham, Washington.

== Selected competition record ==
Year	Competition	Result	Time	Notes
2003	Ultra-Trail du Mont-Blanc	1st	29:28:24	
2004	Wasatch Front 100 Mile Endurance Run	1st	23:49:47	
2005	Western States Endurance Run	4th	20:53:05	
2005	Vermont 100 Mile Endurance Run	1st	18:41:15	
2005	Leadville Trail 100	2nd	22:03:03	
2005	Wasatch Front 100 Mile Endurance Run	3rd	26:34:45	completed grand slam
2006	Leona Divide 50 Mile	1st	7:42:14	
2007	Leona Divide 50 Mile	1st	7:58:49	
2007	Hardrock Hundred Mile Endurance Run	1st	29:24:45	set women's record
2009	Leona Divide 50 Mile	1st	7:25:37	
2009	Ultra-Trail du Mont-Blanc	1st	24:56:01	set women's record
2011	San Diego 100	1st	19:41:13	
2013	Ultra-Trail Mt. Fuji	1st	24:35:45	
2014	Run the Rann 101K	1st	12:59:38	
