= David Roche (runner) =

American ultramarathoner

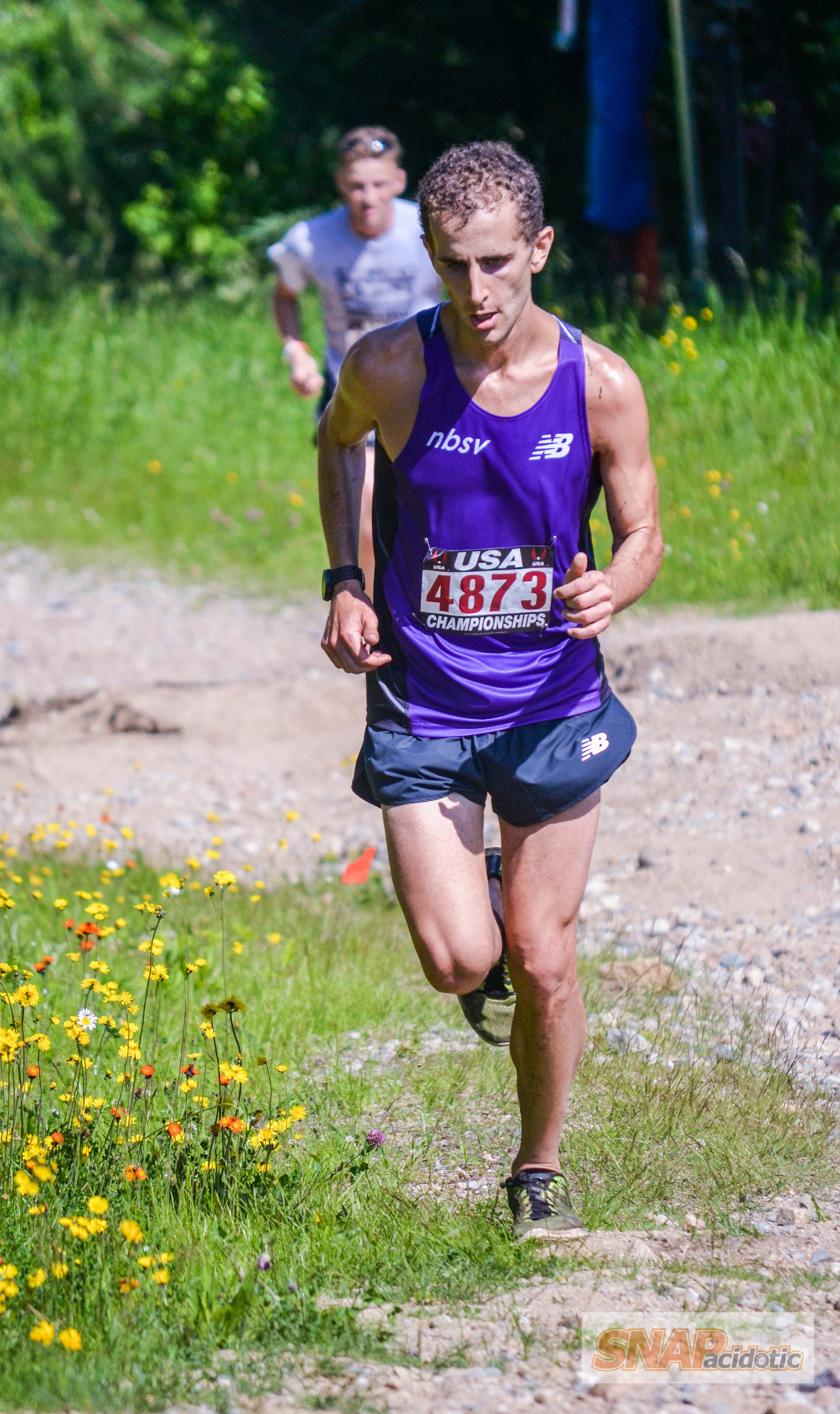
- Roche at 2014 Loon Mountain Race

Personal information
- Nationality: United States
- Born: June 22, 1988 (age 38) Millington, Maryland

Sport
- Sport: Ultramarathon

David Roche (born June 22, 1988) is an ultramarathoner, running coach and internet personality. He currently holds the record for the Leadville Trail 100.

He is also known for his coaching and online presence which includes a YouTube channel and the running podcast, Some Work All Play.

== Athletic career ==
Roche began his college athletics career as a football player at Columbia University. However, after an injury, he began cycling. He later took up endurance running while in graduate school at Duke University. He won the 2012 USATF 10k Trail Championship and received the 2014 USATF Trail Runner of the Year sub-ultra award.

Prior to his ultra running success, Roche could be found frequently in North Carolina trail events while still a student at Duke. He twice participated in the Medoc Trail Races and still holds the 10 mile course record with a time of 55:46 set in 2012. This race famously has "trail names" for each participant. When David first ran he surprised his dad by giving him the name, "Nose Hair the Magnificent" proudly displayed on his race bib.

Roche won the Quad Dipsea Race twice, in 2016 and 2019, and the Way Too Cool 50k in 2016. He has also competed in the duathlon, placing ninth in his age group in the 2009 World Triathlon Duathlon Championships.

In 2024, Roche won the Leadville Trail 100 in 15:26:34 in his first 100-mile race. He broke the previous 19-year-old record held by Matt Carpenter.

In 2025, Roche defended his Leadville Trail 100 title and broke the record he had set the previous year, running the course in 15:12:30.

== Coaching career ==
Roche currently coaches, alongside his wife, elite runners including Tara Dower, Amelia Boone, Jess McClain, Allie Ostrander, Erin Clark, Alice Goodall, Damian Hall, Anna Gibson, Hans Troyer and John Kelly. Former athletes include Grayson Murphy, Clare Gallagher, and Stephanie Garcia. He often works with athletes with a history of disordered eating. Under his coaching, his athletes have achieved top finishes at the Leadville Trail 100, World Mountain Running Championships, and Barkley Marathons and competed in the 2024 US Olympic Trials.

Roche and his wife published a book, The Happy Runner: Love the Process, Get Faster, Run Longer, in 2019.

Alongside his wife, Megan, David hosts the podcast Some Work All Play in which they discuss racing, science-based training, and current events in professional athletics.

== Personal life ==
Roche grew up on a "tree" farm in Crumpton, Maryland. He previously worked as an attorney for the Environmental Law Institute and a contributor to Outside. He is married to Megan (Deakins) Roche. Roche has two young sons. He survived a bike crash in 2024.
