= List of Chi Alpha chapters =

Chi Alpha is an international and interdenominational Christian social club, student society, and service organization founded in 1953 on the campus of Missouri State University. In the United States, Chi Alpha has a large presence throughout the South and Midwest. Globally, its second-largest presence is in Western, Central, and Mediterranean Europe.

Following is a list of Chi Alpha's chapters.

Chapter	Location	Status	References
ACE	Joinville, Santa Catarina, Brazil	Active	
American University	Washington, D.C.	Active	
Angelo State University	San Angelo, Texas	Active	
Anhanguera Educacional	Joinville, Santa Catarina, Brazil	Active	
Aoyama Gakuin University	Shibuya, Tokyo, Japan	Active	
Arizona State University	Tempe, Arizona	Active	
Arkansas Tech University	Russellville, Arkansas	Active	
Auburn University	Auburn, Alabama	Active	
Austin Peay State University	Clarksville, Tennessee	Active	
Ball State University	Muncie, Indiana	Active	
Bellevue College	Bellevue, Washington	Active	
Bemidji State University	Bemidji, Minnesota	Active	
Berlin Citywide	Berlin, Germany	Active	
Black Hills State University	Spearfish, South Dakota	Active	
Boston University	Boston, Massachusetts	Active	
Bradley University	Peoria, Illinois	Active	
British Columbia Institute of Technology	Burnaby, British Columbia, Canada	Active	
Buffalo State University	Buffalo, New York	Active	
California State University, Chico	Chico, California	Active	
California State University, Monterey Bay	Seaside, California	Active	
California State University, Sacramento	Sacramento, California	Active	
California State University, Stanislaus	Turlock, California	Active	
Campinas Citywide	Campinas, São Paulo State, Brazil	Active	
Carroll College	Helena, Montana	Active	
Central Michigan University	Mount Pleasant, Michigan	Active	
Central Washington University	Ellensburg, Washington	Active	
Centro Universitário de Várzea Grande	Várzea Grande, Mato Grosso, Brazil	Active	
Chadron State College	Chadron, Nebraska	Active	
Clark Atlanta University	Atlanta, Georgia	Active	
Clemson University	Clemson, South Carolina	Active	
Coastal Carolina University	Conway, South Carolina	Active	
Cochabamba Citywide	Cochabamba, Bolivia	Active	
Colégio Pitágoras, Cidade Jardim	Belo Horizonte, Minas Gerais, Brazil	Active	
College of St. Scholastica	Duluth, Minnesota	Active	
College of Southern Nevada	Henderson, Nevada	Active	
Colorado State University	Fort Collins, Colorado	Active	
Colorado State University Pueblo	Pueblo, Colorado	Active	
Columbia College	Columbia, Missouri	Active	
Columbia College Chicago	Chicago, Illinois	Active	
Columbus State University	Columbus, Georgia	Active	
Davidson College	Davidson, North Carolina	Active	
DePauw University	Greencastle, Indiana	Active	
Dokkyo University	Saitama Prefecture, Japan	Active	
Doshisha University	Kyoto, Kansai, Japan	Active	
Drake University	Des Moines, Iowa	Active	
Düsseldorf Citywide	Düsseldorf, North Rhine-Westphalia, Germany	Active	
East Central University	Ada, Oklahoma	Active	
Eastern Illinois University	Charleston, Illinois	Active	
Eastern Kentucky University	Richmond, Kentucky	Active	
Eastern Michigan University	Ypsilanti, Michigan	Active	
Eastern New Mexico University	Portales, New Mexico	Active	
Pennsylvania Western University, Edinboro	Edinboro, Pennsylvania	Active	
Embry–Riddle Aeronautical University, Prescott	Prescott, Arizona	Active	
Erfurt Citywide	Erfurt, Thuringia, Germany	Active	
Faculdade IELUSC	Joinville, Santa Catarina, Brazil	Active	
Facultad de Ciencias Economicas Financieras Administrativas	Oruro, Bolivia	Active	
Fairmont State University	Fairmont, West Virginia	Active	
Federal Institute of Santa Catarina	Joinville, Santa Catarina, Brazil	Active	
Federal University of Minas Gerais	Belo Horizonte, Minas Gerais, Brazil	Active	
Federal University of Paraíba	João Pessoa, Paraíba, Brazil	Active	
Federal University of Santa Catarina	Florianópolis, Santa Catarina, Brazil	Active	
Florida Gulf Coast University	Fort Myers, Florida	Active	
Florida State University	Tallahassee, Florida	Active	
FUMEC University	Belo Horizonte, Minas Gerais, Brazil	Active	
Gakushuin University	Tokyo, Japan	Active	
George Mason University	Fairfax, Virginia	Active	
Georgetown University	Washington, D.C.	Active	
Georgia Tech	Atlanta, Georgia	Active	
Görlitz Citywide	Görlitz, Saxony, Germany	Active	
Hampden–Sydney College	Hampden Sydney, Virginia	Active	
Heartland Community College	Normal, Illinois	Active	
Heidelberg Citywide	Heidelberg, Baden-Württemberg, Germany	Active	
Henderson State University	Arkadelphia, Arkansas	Active	
Hendrix College	Conway, Arkansas	Active	
Hitotsubashi University	Tokyo, Japan	Active	
Idaho State University	Pocatello, Idaho	Active	
Illinois State University	Normal, Illinois	Active	
Indiana Institute of Technology	Fort Wayne, Indiana	Active	
Indiana University Bloomington	Bloomington, Indiana	Active	
Indiana University Indianapolis	Indianapolis, Indiana	Active	
Indiana University South Bend	South Bend, Indiana	Active	
Indonesia	Jogjakarta, Indonesia	Active	
International Christian University	Tokyo, Japan	Active	
Iowa State University	Ames, Iowa	Active	
Ivy Tech Community College of Indiana, Fort Wayne	Fort Wayne, Indiana	Active	
Ivy Tech Community College of Indiana, Lafayette Campus	Lafayette, Indiana	Active	
James Madison University	Harrisonburg, Virginia	Active	
Jena Citywide	Jena, Thuringia, Germany	Active	
John A. Logan College	Carterville, Illinois	Active	
Juntendo University	Chiba Prefecture, Japan	Active	
Kanagawa University	Kanagawa-ku, Yokohama, Japan	Active	
Kansas State University	Manhattan, Kansas	Active	
Kanto Gakuin University	Yokohama, Kanazawa, Japan	Active	
Karlsruhe Citywide	Karlsruhe, Baden-Württemberg, Germany	Active	
Kent State University	Kent, Ohio	Active	
Kwansei Gakuin University	Hyōgo, Japan	Active	
Kyiv Citywide	Kyiv, Ukraine	Active	
Kyoto University	Kyoto, Japan	Active	
Kyoto University of Foreign Studies	Kyoto, Japan	Active	
La Paz Citywide	La Paz, and El Alto, Bolivia	Active	
Lake Superior College	Duluth, Minnesota	Active	
Lake Superior State University	Kincheloe, Michigan	Active	
Lamar University	Beaumont, Texas	Active	
Langston University	Langston, Oklahoma	Active	
Linn–Benton Community College	Albany, Oregon	Active	
Longwood University	Farmville, Virginia	Active	
Louisiana State University	Baton Rouge, Louisiana	Active	
Louisiana Tech University	Ruston, Louisiana	Active	
Loyola University Chicago	Chicago, Illinois	Active	
Loyola University New Orleans	New Orleans, Louisiana	Active	
Ludwigshafen Citywide	Ludwigshafen, Rhineland-Palatinate, Germany	Active	
Mannheim Citywide	Mannheim, Baden-Württemberg, Germany	Active	
Marshall University	Huntington, West Virginia	Active	
Massachusetts Institute of Technology	Cambridge, Massachusetts	Active	
McNeese State University	Lake Charles, Louisiana	Active	
Memorial University of Newfoundland	St. John's, Newfoundland and Labrador, Canada	Active	
Merced College	Merced, California	Active	
Midwestern State University	Wichita Falls, Texas	Active	
Minnesota State University Moorhead	Moorhead, Minnesota	Active	
Meredith College	Raleigh, North Carolina	Active	
Michigan State University	East Lansing, Michigan	Active	
Michigan Technological University	Houghton, Michigan	Active	
Midwestern State University	Wichita Falls, Texas	Active	
Minnesota State University, Mankato	Mankato, Minnesota	Active	
Minnesota State University Moorhead	Moorhead, Minnesota	Active	
Mississippi State University	Starkville, Mississippi	Active	
Missouri State University	Springfield, Missouri	Active	
Missouri University of Science and Technology	Rolla, Missouri	Active	
Modesto Junior College	Modesto, California	Active	
Montana State University	Bozeman, Montana	Active	
Montana State University–Northern	Havre, Montana	Active	
Montana Technological University	Butte, Montana	Active	
Montclair State University	Montclair, New Jersey	Active	
Morehead State University	Morehead, Kentucky	Active	
Morehouse College	Atlanta, Georgia	Active	
New Mexico Highlands University	Las Vegas, New Mexico	Active	
New Mexico State University	Las Cruces, New Mexico	Active	
Nicholls State University	Thibodaux, Louisiana	Active	
Niigata University	Niigata, Niigata Prefecture, Japan	Active	
North Carolina State University	Raleigh, North Carolina	Active	
North Dakota State University	Fargo, North Dakota	Active	
Northeastern State University	Tahlequah, Oklahoma	Active	
Northern Arizona University	Flagstaff, Arizona	Active	
Northern Michigan University	Marquette, Michigan	Active	
Northwest Mississippi Community College	Senatobia, Mississippi	Active	
Northwestern University	Evanston, Illinois	Active	
Ohio State University	Columbus, Ohio	Active	
Okinawa Christian University	Nishihara, Okinawa, Japan	Active	
Okinawa Prefectural University of Arts	Naha, Okinawa Prefecture, Japan	Active	
Oklahoma City Community College	Oklahoma City, Oklahoma	Active	
Oklahoma State University	Stillwater, Oklahoma	Active	
Oklahoma State University Institute of Technology	Okmulgee, Oklahoma	Active	
Oregon State University	Corvallis, Oregon	Active	
Ottawa University	Ottawa, Kansas	Active	
Ozarks Technical Community College	Springfield, Missouri	Active	
Penn State Erie, The Behrend College	Erie, Pennsylvania	Active	
Penn State World Campus	University Park, Pennsylvania	Active	
Pennsylvania State University	State College, Pennsylvania	Active	
Pforzheim Citywide	Pforzheim, Baden-Württemberg, Germany	Active	
Piedmont Virginia Community College	Charlottesville, Virginia	Active	
Pontifical Catholic University of Minas Gerais	Belo Horizonte, Minas Gerais, Brazil	Active	
Prairie View A&M University	Prairie View, Texas	Active	
Purdue University	West Lafayette, Indiana	Active	
Purdue University Fort Wayne	Fort Wayne, Indiana	Active	
Queens College, City University of New York	Flushing, Queens, New York City, New York	Active	
Radford University	Radford, Virginia	Active	
Rajabhat University	Thailand	Active	
Ramkhamhaeng University	Bangkok, Thailand	Active	
Reitaku University	Kashiwa, Chiba Prefecture, Japan	Active	
Rend Lake College	Ina, Illinois	Active	
Rice University	Houston, Texas	Active	
Rikkyo University	Tokyo, Japan	Active	
Rogers State University	Claremore, Oklahoma	Active	
Rose State College	Midwest City, Oklahoma	Active	
Rowan University	Glassboro, New Jersey	Active	
Rutgers University–New Brunswick	New Brunswick, New Jersey	Active	
University of the Ryukyus	Nishihara, Okinawa, Japan	Active	
Saint Louis University	St. Louis, Missouri	Active	
Salem College	Winston-Salem, North Carolina	Active	
Sam Houston State University	Huntsville, Texas	Active	
San Jose State University	San Jose, California	Active	
Santa Catarina State University	Joinville, Santa Catarina, Brazil	Active	
Santa Cruz Citywide	Santa Cruz, Bolivia	Active	
Seminole State College of Florida	Sanford, Florida	Active	
Senzoku Gakuen College of Music	Kawasaki, Kanagawa, Japan	Active	
Simon Fraser University	Greater Vancouver, British Columbia, Canada	Active	
Sinclair Community College	Dayton, Ohio	Active	
Skagit Valley College	Mount Vernon, Washington	Active	
Sonoma State University	Rohnert Park, California	Active	
Sophia University	Tokyo, Japan	Active	
Southeast Missouri State University	Cape Girardeau, Missouri	Active	
Southeastern Louisiana University	Hammond, Louisiana	Active	
Southern Arkansas University	Magnolia, Arkansas	Active	
Southern Illinois University Carbondale	Carbondale, Illinois	Active	
Southern University	Baton Rouge, Louisiana	Active	
Stamford International University	Bangkok, Thailand	Active	
Stanford University	Stanford, California	Active	
Stony Brook University	Stony Brook, New York	Active	
Stephen F. Austin State University	Nacogdoches, Texas	Active	
Stephens College	Columbia, Missouri	Active	
Sucre Citywide	Sucre, Bolivia	Active	
Sungkyunkwan University	Suwon, Gyeonggi, South Korea	Active	
Tarija Citywide	Tarija, Bolivia	Active	
Tarrant County College	Fort Worth, Texas	Active	
Temple University	Philadelphia, Pennsylvania	Active	
Tennessee Tech	Cookeville, Tennessee	Active	
Texas A&M University–Corpus Christi	Corpus Christi, Texas	Active	
Texas A&M University–Kingsville	Kingsville, Texas	Active	
Texas Christian University	Fort Worth, Texas	Active	
Texas State University	San Marcos, Texas	Active	
Texas Tech University	Lubbock, Texas	Active	
Texas Wesleyan University	Fort Worth, Texas	Active	
Texas Woman's University	Denton, Texas	Active	
Tomás Frías Autonomous University	Potosí, Bolivia	Active	
Toyo Gakuen University	Nagareyama, Chiba, Japan	Active	
Troy University	Troy, Alabama	Active	
Tulane University	New Orleans, Louisiana	Active	
Tulsa Community College	Tulsa, Oklahoma	Active	
UNA BH Barro Preto	Barro Preto, Belo Horizonte, Brazil	Active	
Unic Beira Rio	Cuiabá, Mato Grosso, Brazil	Active	
UniSociesc	Joinville, Santa Catarina, Brazil	Active	
Universidade da Região de Joinville	Joinville, Santa Catarina, Brazil	Active	
University Center of Belo Horizonte, Buritis Campus	Buritis, Belo Horizonte, Brazil	Active	
University of Akron	Akron, Ohio	Active	
University of Alabama	Tuscaloosa, Alabama	Active	
University of Alabama in Huntsville	Huntsville, Alabama	Active	
University of Alaska Anchorage	Anchorage, Alaska	Active	
University of Alaska Fairbanks	Fairbanks, Alaska	Active	
University of Arizona	Tucson, Arizona	Active	
University of Arkansas	Fayetteville, Arkansas	Active	
University of Arkansas–Fort Smith	Fort Smith, Arkansas	Active	
University of Arkansas at Monticello	Monticello, Arkansas	Active	
University of Arkansas at Pine Bluff	Pine Bluff, Arkansas	Active	
University of Arkansas at Little Rock	Little Rock, Arkansas	Active	
University of British Columbia	Vancouver, British Columbia, Canada	Active	
University of British Columbia Okanagan	Kelowna, British Columbia, Canada	Active	
University of California, Davis	Davis, California	Active	
University of California, Merced	Merced, California	Active	
University of California, Santa Barbara	Santa Barbara, California	Active	
University of California, Santa Cruz	Santa Cruz, California	Active	
University of Central Arkansas	Conway, Arkansas	Active	
University of Central Florida	Orlando, Florida	Active	
University of Central Missouri	Warrensburg, Missouri	Active	
University of Central Oklahoma	Edmond, Oklahoma	Active	
University of Cincinnati	Cincinnati, Ohio	Active	
University of Colorado Boulder	Boulder, Colorado	Active	
University of Connecticut	Storrs, Connecticut	Active	
University of Dayton	Dayton, Ohio	Active	
University of Delaware	Newark, Delaware	Active	
University of Denver	Denver, Colorado	Active	
University of Florida	Gainesville, Florida	Active	
University of Georgia	Athens, Georgia	Active	
University of Hawaiʻi at Mānoa	Waipahu, Hawaii	Active	
University of Houston	Houston, Texas	Active	
University of Idaho	Moscow, Idaho	Active	
University of Illinois Chicago	Chicago, Illinois	Active	
University of Illinois Urbana-Champaign	Urbana, Illinois	Active	
University of Iowa	Iowa City, Iowa	Active	
University of Kansas	Lawrence, Kansas	Active	
University of Louisiana at Lafayette	Lafayette, Louisiana	Active	
University of Louisiana at Monroe	Monroe, Louisiana	Active	
University of Maine	Orono, Maine	Active	
University of Mary Washington	Fredericksburg, Virginia	Active	
University of Memphis	Memphis, Tennessee	Active	
University of Miami	Coral Gables, Florida	Active	
University of Michigan	Ann Arbor, Michigan	Active	
University of Minnesota Duluth	Duluth, Minnesota	Active	
University of Minnesota	Minneapolis, Minnesota	Active	
University of Mississippi	University, Mississippi	Active	
University of Missouri	Columbia, Missouri	Active	
University of Montana	Missoula, Montana	Active	
University of Montana Western	Dillon, Montana	Active	
University of Nebraska–Lincoln	Lincoln, Nebraska	Active	
University of Nebraska Omaha	Omaha, Nebraska	Active	
University of New Orleans	New Orleans, Louisiana	Active	
University of North Carolina at Chapel Hill	Chapel Hill, North Carolina	Active	
University of North Carolina Wilmington	Wilmington, North Carolina	Active	
University of North Dakota	Grand Forks, North Dakota	Active	
University of North Texas	Denton, Texas	Active	
University of Northern Colorado	Greeley, Colorado	Active	
University of Northern Iowa	Cedar Falls, Iowa	Active	
University of Notre Dame	South Bend, Indiana	Active	
University of Oklahoma	Norman, Oklahoma	Active	
University of Oregon	Eugene, Oregon	Active	
University of Pennsylvania	Philadelphia, Pennsylvania	Active	
University of Pittsburgh	Pittsburgh, Pennsylvania	Active	
University of St. Thomas	Saint Paul, Minnesota	Active	
University of Science and Arts of Oklahoma	Chickasha, Oklahoma	Active	
University of South Carolina	Columbia, South Carolina	Active	
University of South Dakota	Vermillion, South Dakota	Active	
University of South Florida	Tampa, Florida	Active	
University of Southern Indiana	Evansville, Indiana	Active	
University of Southern Mississippi	Hattiesburg, Mississippi	Active	
University of Tennessee	Knoxville, Tennessee	Active	
University of Tennessee at Chattanooga	Chattanooga, Tennessee	Active	
University of Texas at Arlington	Arlington, Texas	Active	
University of Texas at Austin	Austin, Texas	Active	
University of Texas at San Antonio	San Antonio, Texas	Active	
University of Texas at Tyler	Tyler, Texas	Active	
University of Texas Rio Grande Valley	Edinburg, Texas	Active	
University of Texas Rio Grande Valley, Brownsville	Brownsville, Texas	Active	
University of the Fraser Valley	British Columbia, Canada	Active	
University of the Pacific	Stockton, California	Active	
University of Tokyo	Bunkyō, Tokyo, Japan	Active	
University of Toledo	Toledo, Ohio	Active	
University of Tsukuba	Tsukuba, Ibaraki, Japan	Active	
University of Tulsa	Tulsa, Oklahoma	Active	
University of Utah	Salt Lake City, Utah	Active	
University of Vermont	Burlington, Vermont	Active	
University of Victoria	Victoria, British Columbia, Canada	Active	
University of Virginia	Charlottesville, Virginia	Active	
University of West Florida	Pensacola, Florida	Active	
University of Wisconsin–La Crosse	La Crosse, Wisconsin	Active	
University of Wisconsin–Milwaukee	Milwaukee, Wisconsin	Active	
University of Wisconsin–River Falls	River Falls, Wisconsin	Active	
University of Wisconsin–Eau Claire	Eau Claire, Wisconsin	Active	
University of Wisconsin–Green Bay	Green Bay, Wisconsin	Active	
University of Wisconsin–Oshkosh	Oshkosh, Wisconsin	Active	
University of Wisconsin–Stevens Point	Stevens Point, Wisconsin	Active	
University of Wisconsin–Superior	Superior, Wisconsin	Active	
University of Zambia	Lusaka, Zambia	Active	
Unoesc Joaçaba	Joaçaba, Santa Cantaria, Brazil	Active	
Valley City State University	Valley City, North Dakota	Active	
Vancouver International College	Vancouver, British Columbia, Canada	Active	
Vienna Citywide	Vienna, Austria	Active	
Virginia Commonwealth University	Richmond, Virginia	Active	
Virginia Tech	Blacksburg, Virginia	Active	
Wake Forest University	Winston-Salem, North Carolina	Active	
Waseda University	Shinjuku, Tokyo, Japan	Active	
Washington State University	Pullman, Washington	Active	
Washtenaw Community College	Ann Arbor Charter Township, Michigan	Active	
Wayne State University	Detroit, Michigan	Active	
Weimar Citywide	Weimar, Thuringia, Germany	Active	
West Texas A&M University	Canyon, Texas	Active	
West Virginia University	Morgantown, West Virginia	Active	
Western Colorado University	Gunnison, Colorado	Active	
Western Washington University	Bellingham, Washington	Active	
Whatcom Community College	Bellingham, Washington	Active	
Wichita State University	Wichita, Kansas	Active	
Winona State University	Winona, Minnesota	Active	
Winston-Salem State University	Winston-Salem, North Carolina	Active	
Wright State University	Dayton, Ohio	Active	
Xavier University of Louisiana	New Orleans, Louisiana	Active	
Yale University	New Haven, Connecticut	Active	
Youngstown State University	Youngstown, Ohio	Active	
Zittau Citywide	Zittau, Saxony, Germany	Active	
