= Junko Kazukawa =

Japanese ultrarunner

Personal information
- Native name: 数川 純子
- Full name: Junko Kazukawa
- Nationality: Japanese
- Born: 18 July 1963 (age 62) Sapporo

Sport
- Country: United States
- Event: Ultrarunning

Junko Kazukawa (数川 純子 Kazukawa Junko, born 1963) is a Japanese-born ultrarunner who currently lives in Denver, Colorado, U.S. A two-time breast-cancer survivor, Kazukawa competes in marathon, ultramarathon and cycling events. She was the first person to complete the Leadville series and the Ultrarunning Grand Slam in a single year.

== Biography ==
Kazukawa was born in Sapporo, Japan in 1963. After completing her primary and secondary education, she earned a master's degree in Kinesiology and Exercise Physiology. She moved to Denver, Colorado in 1988 and works as a trainer and coach for runners. Kazukawa began running marathons in 2000 and had completed 48 marathons and 11 ultramarathons by 2017, including such venues as the Boston Marathon, the Ultra-Trail Mt. Fuji and the Ultra-Trail du Mont-Blanc. She was introduced to mountain biking by a boyfriend and also competes in 50 and 100 mile cycling events.

Kazukawa was diagnosed with breast cancer in 2005 and after completing a five-year treatment plan was diagnosed with new cancerous tumors in 2009. After undergoing a double mastectomy, she competed in the 2009 New York City Marathon five weeks after her surgery, while she was undergoing chemotherapy. In 2011, Kazukawa completed her first Leadville 100, as a fundraiser for the Susan G. Komen Foundation. She completed her first Leadwoman series in 2014—which includes the "Leadville marathon, the 50 mile mountain bike ride, the 50 mile "Silver Rush" run, the 100 mile mountain bike ride, the 10k trail run, and finally, the 100 mile endurance run"—finishing in third place. In 2015, Kazukawa completed the Ultrarunning Grand Slam—which includes the Western States 100, Vermont 100, Leadville Trail 100 and Wasatch Front 100. In addition to the Grand Slam, Kazukawa also completed the Leadwoman series challenge in 2015, making her the first person to complete both events in a single year. In 2016, her inspirational feat was recognized by the Sportswomen of Colorado.
