= Barcelona Trail Races =

Spanish running event

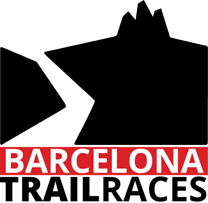
Barcelona Trail Races Logo

The Barcelona Trail Races or BTR (also known as Ultratrail Collserola during its first editions) is a running event that includes several mountain races or trail running races. It takes place once a year in the Collserola Park in Barcelona, Catalonia, Spain. The first edition was in 2013.

In 2017, a relay category was included for the first time in teams of two runners with only one fixed relay point. In 2018, the relay modality changed and became more flexible. The teams were of minimum two and maximum five runners and the relay place could be decided by the team but had to be in one of the refreshment posts.

In 2020 the race was canceled due to COVID-19 restrictions.

== Editions ==
Date	Start / finish place		Race 1	Race 2	Race 3	Race 4	Relay race
Nov 23rd, 2013	CEM Can Caralleu, Sarrià, Barcelona	Compressport Ultratrail Collserola	74 km	43 km	21 km	-	-
Nov 22nd, 2014	CEM Les Moreres, Esplugues de Llobregat	Helly Hansen Ultratrail Collserola by Compressport	80 km	45 km	23 km	-	-
Nov 21st, 2015	CEM Mundet, Horta, Barcelona	Helly Hansen Ultratrail Collserola by Compressport	85 km	38 km	23 km	10 km	-
Nov 26th, 2016	Horta Velodrome, Barcelona	Helly Hansen Barcelona Trail Races by Polar	76 km	46 km	-	-	-
Nov 25th, 2017	Horta Velodrome, Barcelona	Barcelona Trail Races	76 km	-	-	-	Teams of 2 runners. 47 + 29 km = Total 76 km
Nov 24th, 2018	Horta Velodrome, Barcelona	Barcelona Trail Races	76 km	-	-	-	Teams of 2,3,4 or 5 runners. Total 76 km
Nov 23rd, 2019	Horta Velodrome, Barcelona	Barcelona Trail Races	76 km	-	-	-	Teams of 2,3,4 or 5 runners. Total 76 km
Nov 21st, 2020	Canceled						
Nov 20th, 2021							

== Route ==
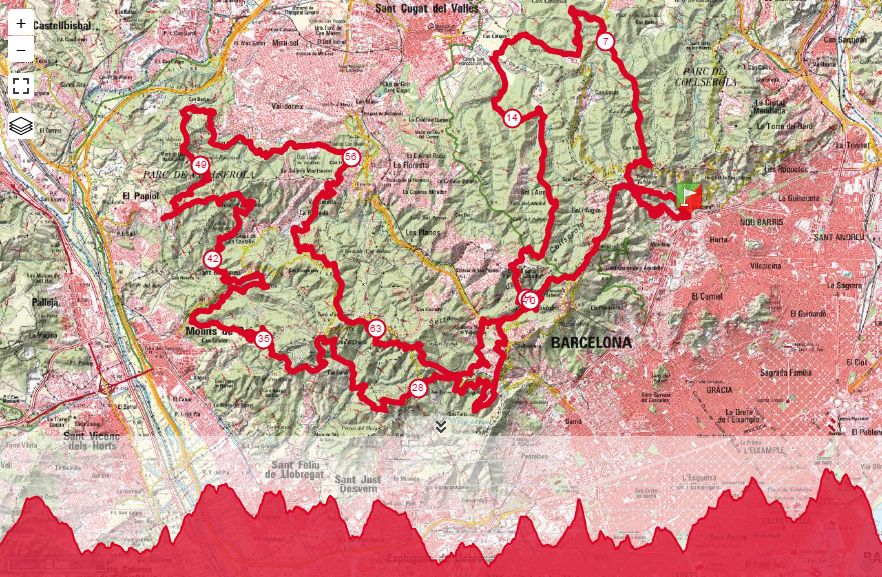
Route and elevation profile of Barcelona Trail Races 2016. 76 km and +2600m elevation gain.

The route of the Barcelona Trail Races is not characterised by large elevation gains, very steep slopes or technical difficulties. It is "a mountain race that has more long distances than impossible slopes and in which all the secrets that Collserola hides are revealed". The hardness of the race is due to the softness of the ascents and descents that push the runners to a non-stop pace making it very fast: "here you come to run and not have a second to rest. A leg-breaker route". Note that the pace of the winners in the long race is between 5 and 6 min/km.

The fact that the race starts in the city of Barcelona, ″it's only a few stops on the metro from the centre of Barcelona″, and the characteristics of the route, make it a perfect option for those who want to run their first ultra mountain race: ″Thinking about where to do your first trail marathon? Go to Barcelona. If you are looking for a race where city meets trail, this is it″.

== Winners ==
=== Female winners ===
2013
74 km			43 km			21 km		
1	Judit Franch Pons	8:10:37	1	Emma Roca	3:59:57	1	(Brazil) Fernanda Maciel	1:59:12
2	(France) Djanina Freytag	8:53:22	2	(Finland) Paivi Linna	4:43:40	2	Merçè Font Roca	2:07:38
3	Mª Carmen Sánchez Izquierdo	9:26:03	3	Bárbara Sagi Barrera	4:54:21	3	Silvia Tremoleda	2:11:55

2014
80 km			45 km			23 km		
1	Laia Díez Fontanet	8:27:00	1	Eva Mesado Ortiz	4:28:43	1	Laura Sanzberro Solana	2:03:49
2	Beatriz Pascuas Medel	9:28:39	2	(Sweden) Sarah Eriksson	4:37:14	2	(France) Marie Paturel	2:05:03
3	Mª Carmen Sánchez Izquierdo	9:45:54	3	(United Kingdom) Andrea Tolve	4:39:05	3	Angela Garcia Femenia	2:12:56

2015
85 km			38 km			23 km			10 km		
1	Carme Tort Creus	9:44:24	1	Eva Mesado	3:50:09	1	Laura Sanzberro Solana	2:04:22	1	Marta Palau Garriga	1:01:45
2	Anna Macià Erra	9:55:09	2	Raquel Velasco Peidró	4:00:53	2	Marta Martin Morata	2:14:24	2	(France) Carol Mace	1:02:04
3	Carolina Guillen Muñoz	10:24:07	3	Mª Carmen Sánchez Izquierdo	4:18:02	3	Noa Arias Manga	2:16:41	3	Núria Miró Codina	1:04:20

2016
76 km			46 km		
1	Laia Díez Fontanet	7:55:32	1	Eva Mesado Ortiz	4:39:40
2	Marta Prat Llorens	8:40:35	2	(United Kingdom) Natalie White	4:50:53
3	(Germany) Julia Fatton	8:52:50	3	Ester Casas Gimeno	4:56:44

2017
76 km
1
2
3

=== Male winners ===
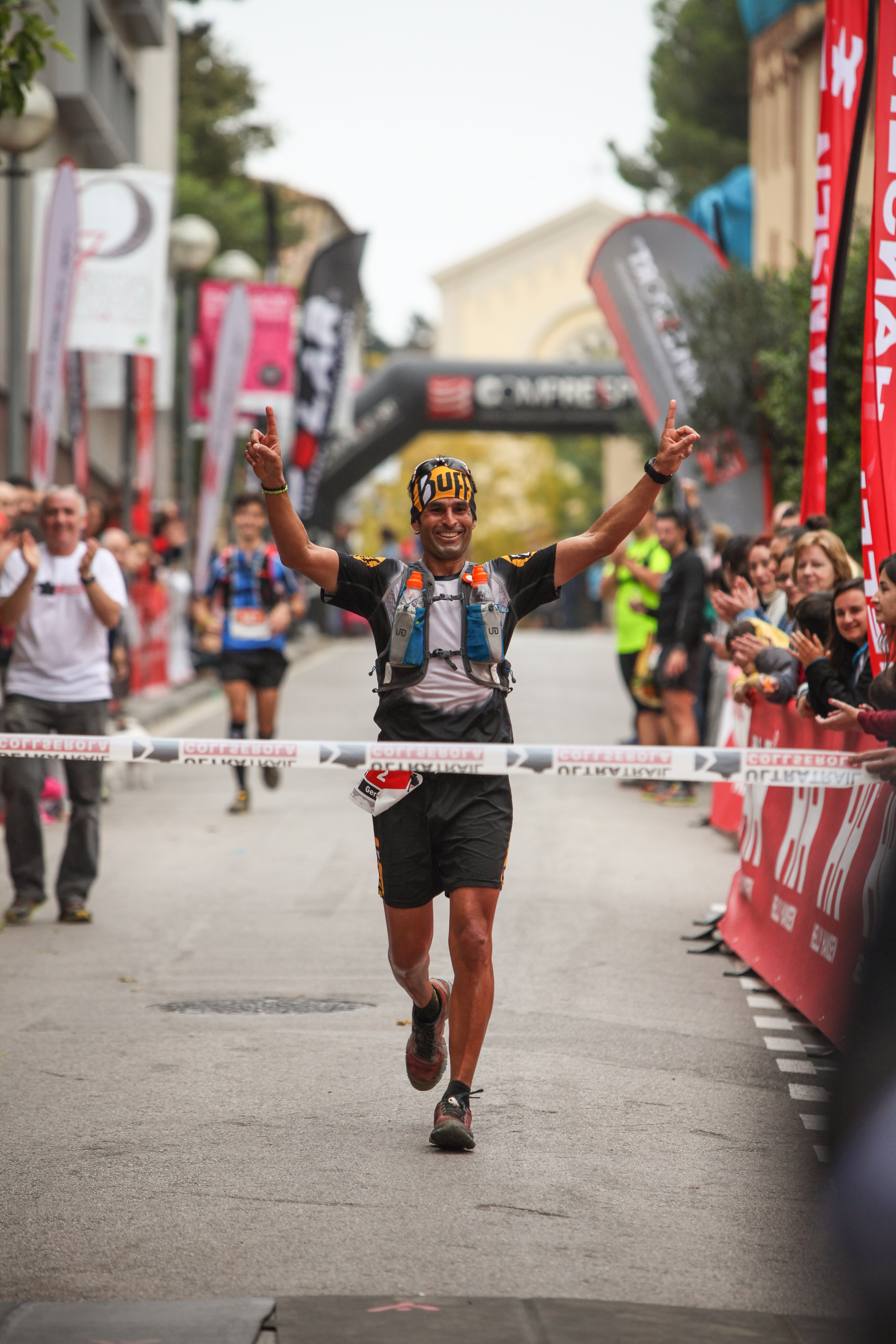
Gerard Morales winner of Ultratrail Collserola 2014.

2013
74 km			43 km			21 km		
1	Toti Bes Ginesta	6:29:00	1	Carles Sànchez Casals	3:44:53	1	Marc Roig Tió	1:41:18
2	Pau Zamora Perez	6:43:12	2	Salvador Milan Marco	4:15:11	2	Alejandro Martinez Núñez	1:42:20
3	Pau Capell Gil	6:45:43	3	Manel Casoni Rero	4:22:34	3	Xavier Serra Termens	1:43:40

2014
80 km			45 km			23 km		
1	Gerard Morales Ramirez	6:57:12	1	Emilio Fernandez Puente	3:3:51	1	Oriol Barbany Bofill	1:47:35
2	Iván Ortiz Carrión	7:02:39	2	Alejandro Martinez Nuñez	3:54:37	2	Boris Valles Alonso	1:48:12
3	Javi Castillo Lozano	7:02:56	3	Ferran Mascaro Zamora	3:54:50	3	Carlos Lancharro Arroyo	1:49:16

2015
85 km			38 km			23 km			10 km		
1	Iván Camps Puga	8:04:25	1	Roberto Heras	3:02:55	1	Andreu Marimon Sastre	1:45:48	1	Juan Antonio Rodriguez Galan	46:59
2	Carles Sànchez Casals	8:05:12	2	Pau Zamora Perez	3:07:47	2	Daniel Sagrera Vulart	1:47:03	2	Marco P. Seco Vaz	47:16
3	Javi Castillo Loano	8:14:43	3	Francisco Perez Verdugo	3:08:14	3	Eudald Murtra	1:47:04	3	Gerard Badia Mondon	48:46

2016
76 km			46 km		
1	(Denmark) Anders Aagaard Hansen	6:59:22	1	(Latvia) Andrejs Jesko	3:41:39
2	Miguel Angel González Cano	7:09:49	2	David López Hernández	3:53:56
3	Sergi Masip Cosin	7:11:56	3	(Belarus) Mikita Hryhoryeu	3:54:54

2017
76 km
1
2
3

== Pictures ==
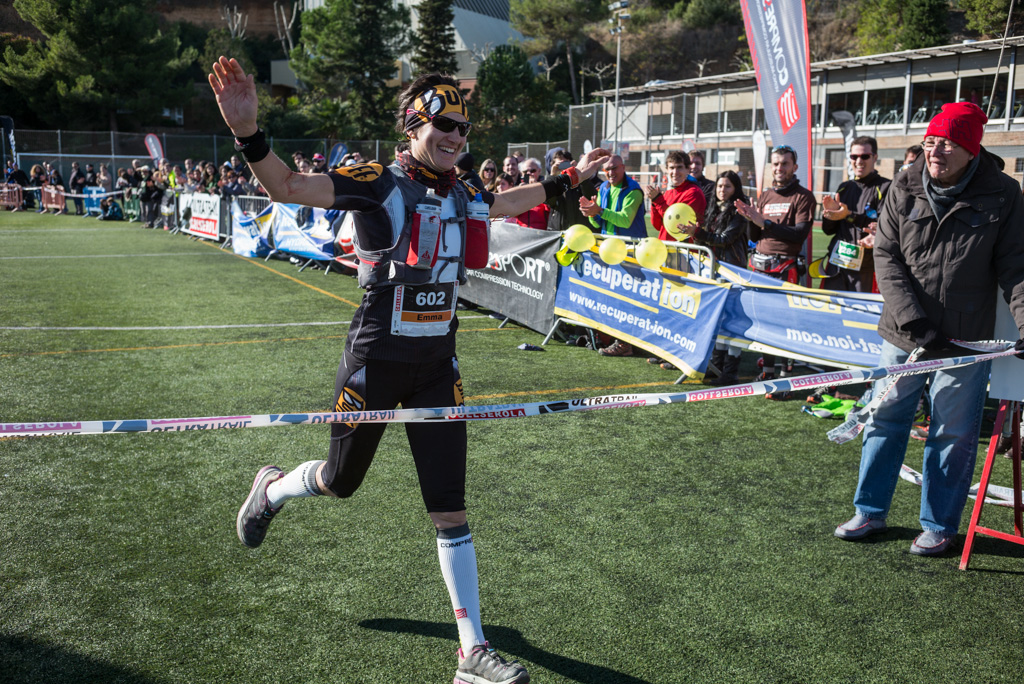
Emma Roca at finish line of Ultratrail Collserola 2013

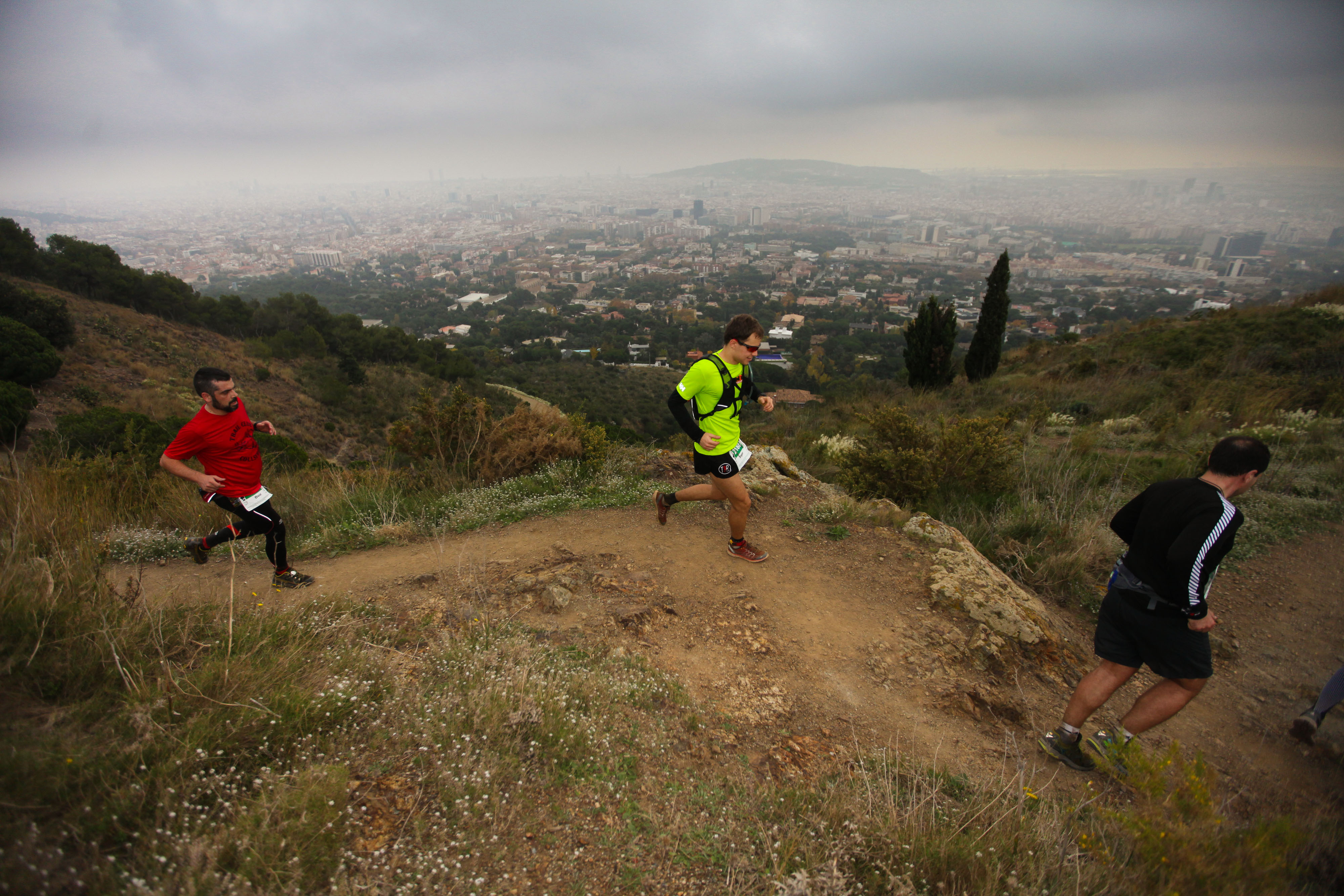
Ultratrail Collserola 2014

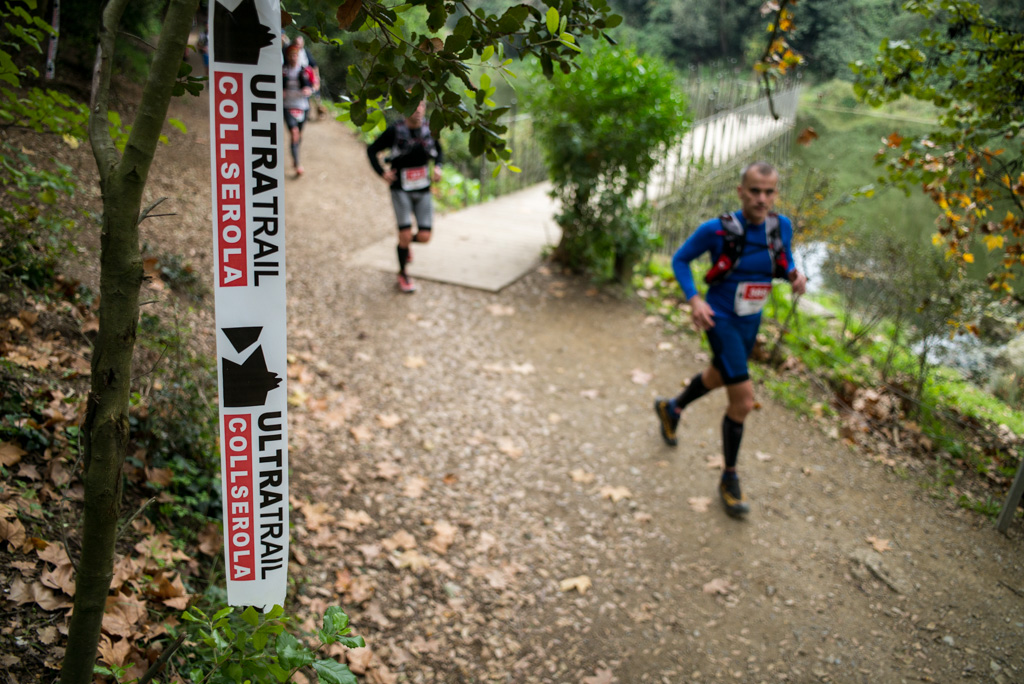
Ultratrail Collserola 2014. Pond of Vallvidrera, Collserola.

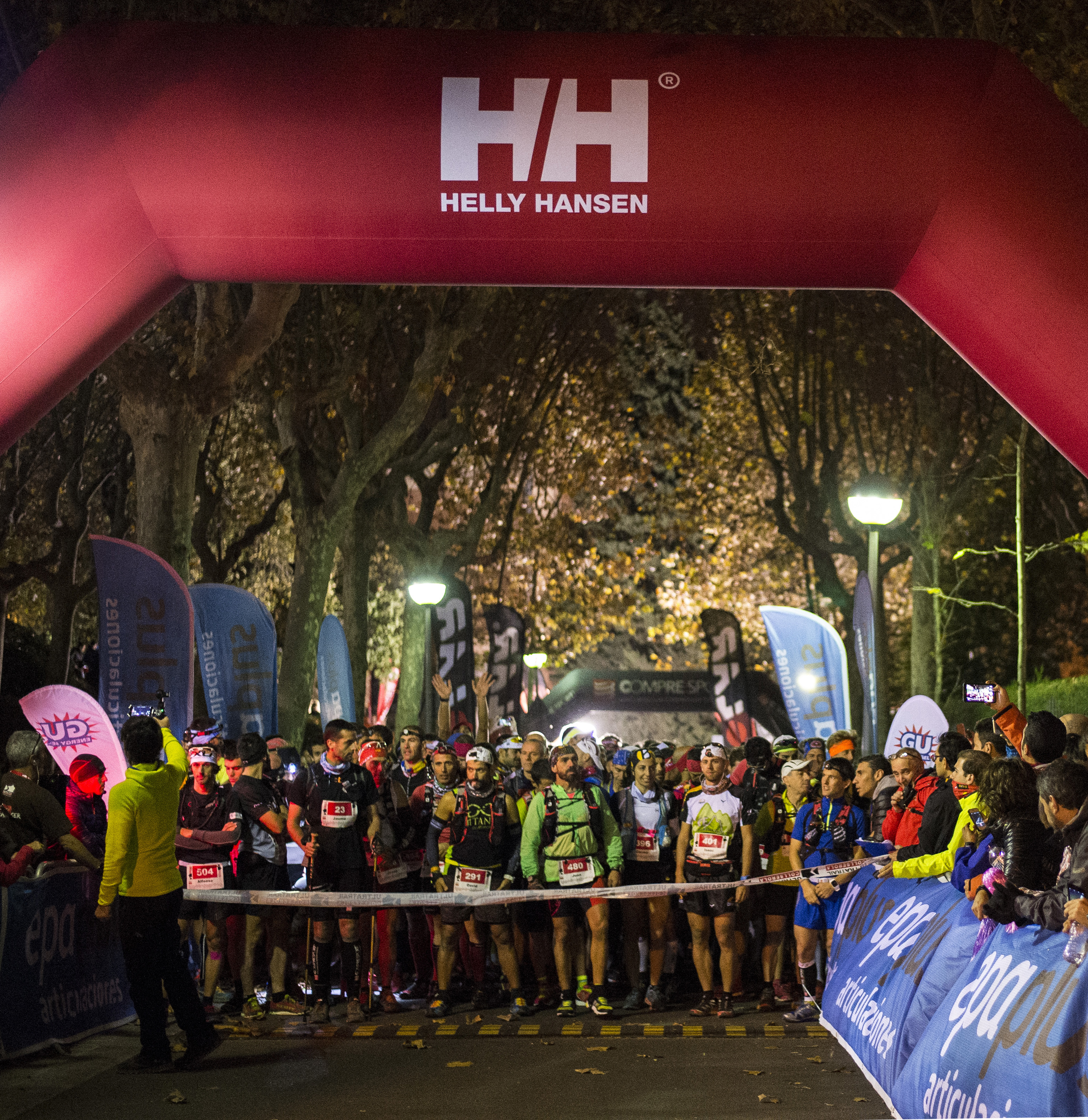
Sart. Ultratrail Collserola 2015.

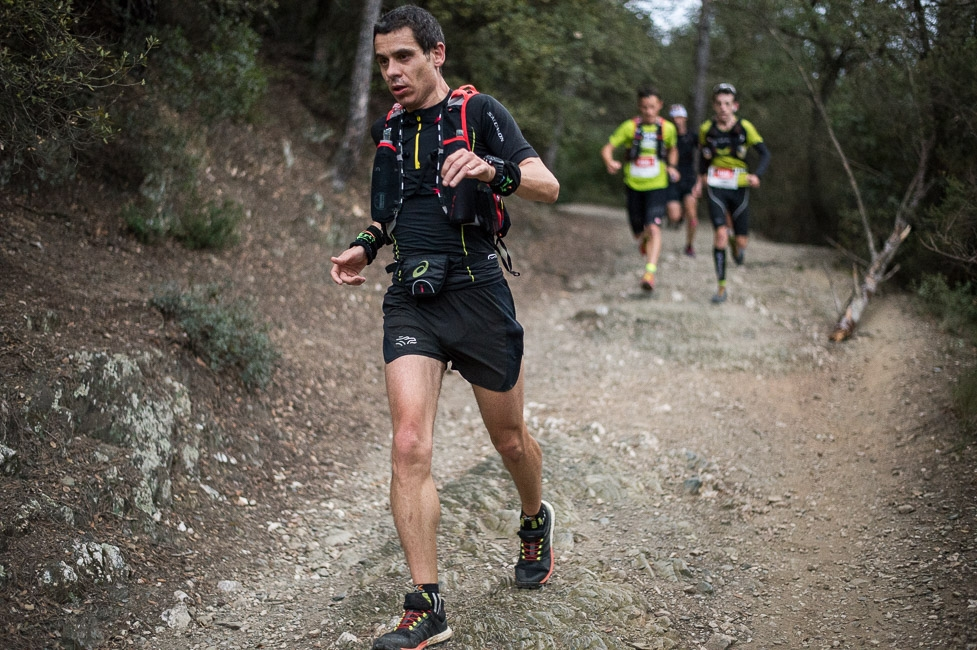
Carles Sanchez. Second at Ultratrail Collserola 2015.

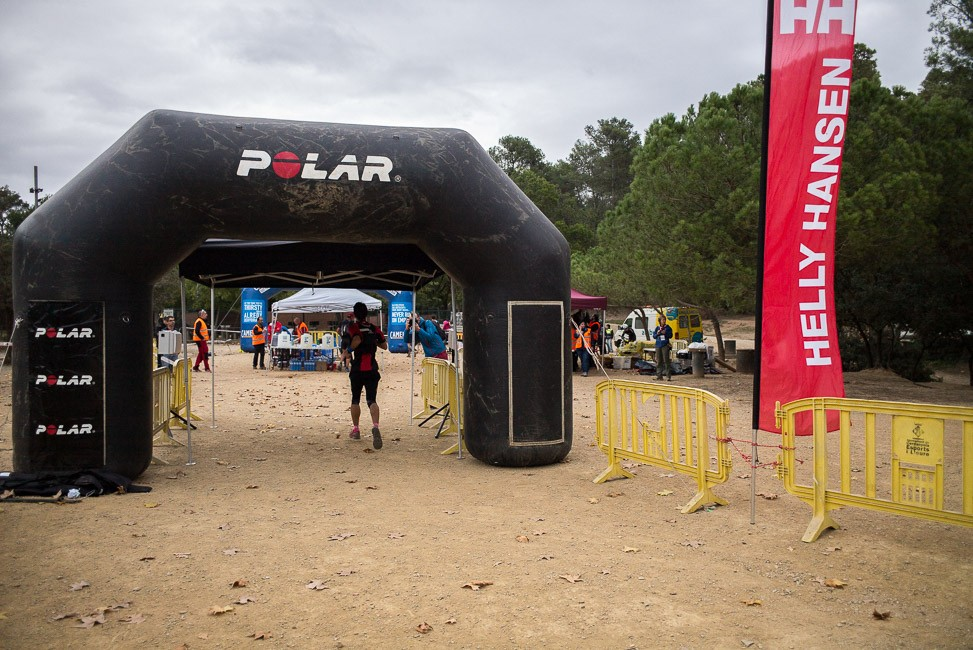
Refreshment post at Can Coll, Cerdanyola. Ultratrail Collserola 2015.

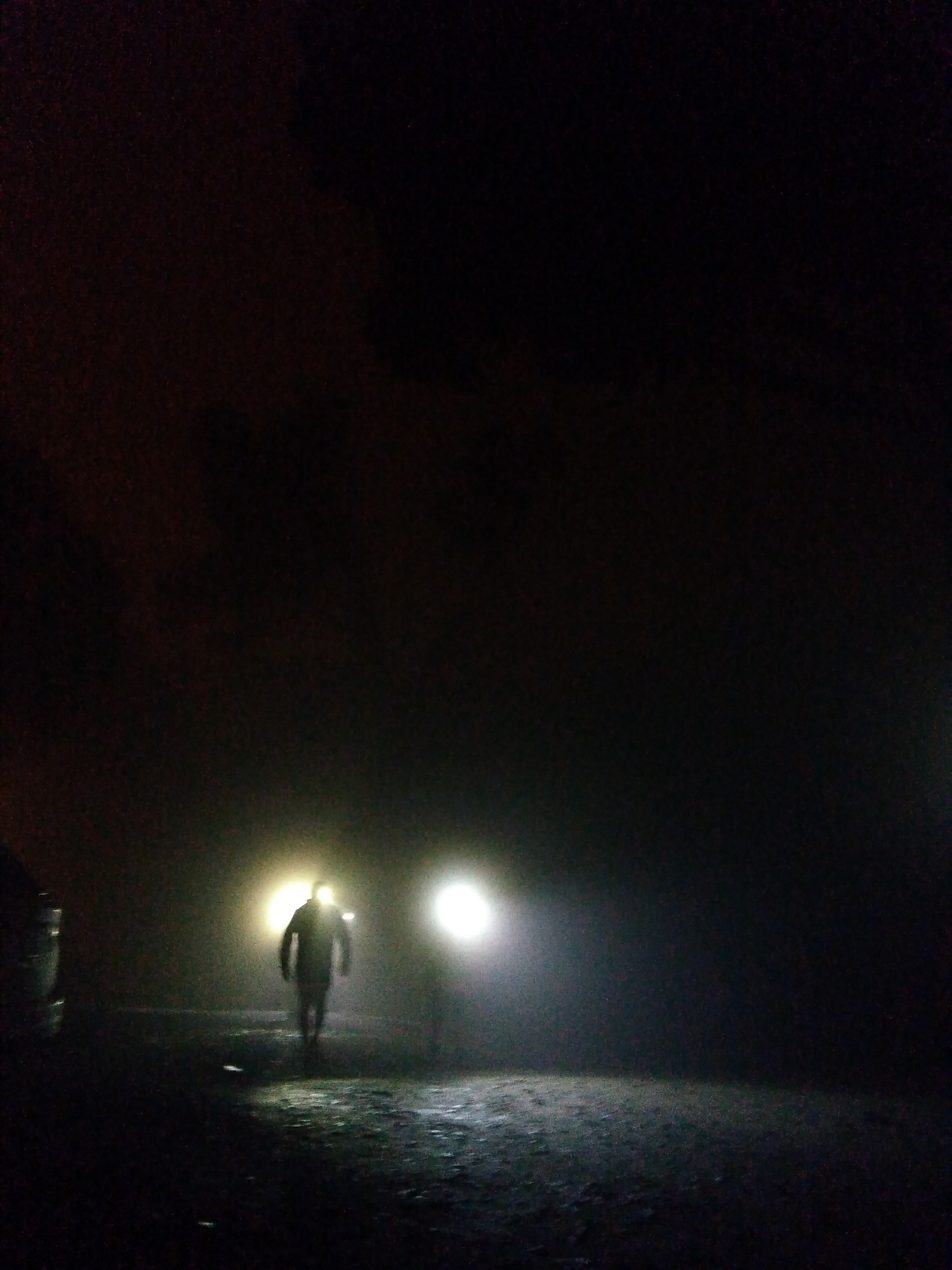
Last runners at Vista Rica, Collserola, 9pm. Barcelona Trail Races 2016.

== Links ==
- Official web page www.bcntrailraces.com
