= Mt. Fuji 100 =

Ultramarathon race in Japan

- Date: April
- Location: Yamanashi Prefecture and Shizuoka Prefecture, Japan
- Event type: trail
- Distance: 166.6 km
- Established: 2012
- Course records: Men: Hirokazu Nishimura 18:15:32 (2022); Women: Courtney Dauwalter 19:21:22 (2024)
- Website: Mt. Fuji 100

The Mt. Fuji 100, formerly Ultra-Trail Mt. Fuji (ウルトラトレイル・マウントフジ, urutoratoreirumountofuji), is an annual ultramarathon sporting event in Yamanashi Prefecture and Shizuoka Prefecture, Japan. The race started in 2012, and changed its name for the 10th edition in 2024.

The total distance is 166.6 km with 7,038 m of cumulative altitude gain, and the time limit is 44.5 hours. The race gained recognition as a sister sport event of the Ultra-Trail du Mont-Blanc, and was affiliated with the now-defunct Ultra-Trail World Tour. Beginning with the 2024 edition, it became part of the World Trail Majors race series.

As of the 2025 season, the event includes three distances of races:

- FUJI 100 mi (approx. 6,254m elevation gain)
- KAI 70k (approx. 3,052m elevation gain)
- ASUMI 40k (approx. 1,445m elevation gain)

== FUJI 100mi course ==
The 166 km course circulates around Mount Fuji, cumulatively gaining 7,038 m of altitude. Runners must complete the course in under 44.5 hours. The finish venue is Fuji Hokuroku Park. The participants are limited to those over 18 years old, and need to submit a proof of earning sufficient points by finishing other trail races.

== Results ==
Year	Distance	Runners	Finishers	Winner Male	Time	Winner Female	Time	Notes
2025	166.6 km/6254m+	2327	1509	Joaquín López Ecuador	17:48:40	Cheung Man-yee Hong Kong	23:42:00	
2024	166.6 km /7038m+	2146	1442	Guomin Deng China	19:10:34	Courtney Dauwalter USA	19:21:22	
2023	165.3 km /7574m+	2387	1687	Jiaju Zhao China	19:35:24	Fuzhao Xiang China	24:14:51	
2022	163.2 km /7390m+	1808	1470	Hirokazu Nishimura Japan	18:15:32	Kimino Miyazaki Japan	22:14:15	
2021	Cancelled due to Coronavirus pandemic.							
2020	Cancelled due to Coronavirus pandemic.							
2019	165.9 km/7620m+	2450	91	Xavier Thévenard France	19:36:26	Fuzhao Xiang China	24:20:00	The course was shortened for most runners due to weather.
2018	167.4 km/+7610m	1480	1077	Dylan Bowman USA	19:21:21	Courtney Dauwalter USA	23:57:48	
2017	Cancelled due to bad weather.							
2016	44.2 km / 1500m+	1384	1343	Dylan Bowman USA	3:46:38	Fernanda Maciel Brazil	4:51:03	The course was shortened due to bad weather.
2015	168.9 km / 7180m+	1363	564	Gediminas Grinius Lithuania	20:40:58	Uxue Fraile Spain	25:34:02	
2014	169 km / 9478m+	1422	849	François D'Haene France	19:09:03	Núria Picas Spain	23:27:34	
2013	161 km / 9164m+	991	726	Yoshikazu Hara Japan	19:39:48	Krissy Moehl USA	24:35:45	
2012	156 km / 9164m+	852	562	Julien Chorier France	18:53:12	Nerea Martinez Urruzola Spain	24:05:04	
