= Courtney Dauwalter =

American ultramarathon runner

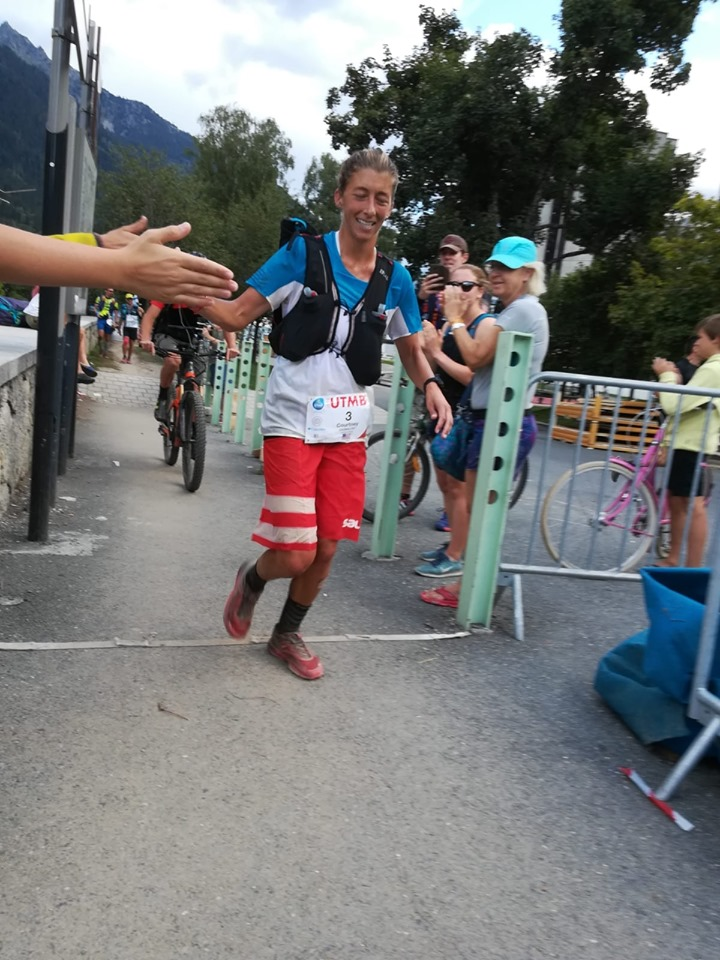
- Courtney Dauwalter at Ultra-Trail du Mont-Blanc 2019

Personal information
- Nationality: (United States) American
- Born: February 13, 1985 (age 41) Hopkins, Minnesota
- Home town: Leadville, Colorado
- Education: University of Denver, University of Mississippi
- Years active: 2017–present

Sport
- Events: Ultramarathon, trail running
- Team: Salomon

Courtney Dauwalter (born February 13, 1985) is an American ultramarathon runner and former teacher. Widely regarded as one of the world's best ultra trail runners, in 2023 Dauwalter became the first woman to win Western States 100, Hardrock 100 and the Ultra-Trail du Mont-Blanc in the same year.

== Early life ==
Dauwalter was raised in Hopkins, Minnesota and competed in track, cross-country, and Nordic skiing in high school. During her high school career she was a four-time Minnesota state champion in Nordic skiing.

She attended the University of Denver on a cross-country skiing scholarship studying biology, and then earned a master's degree in teaching from the University of Mississippi in 2010 while participating in the Mississippi Teacher Corps.

She taught for several years, teaching biology, chemistry, and physical sciences for middle and high-schoolers in the Denver area, before becoming a full-time professional runner in 2017.

== Personal life ==
Dauwalter lives and trains above 10,000 ft in Leadville, Colorado. She is married to Kevin Schmidt, who supports her in ultrarunning events. She does not have any children or pets.

She is known for her positive attitude and sense of humor during races, following a relaxed approach to nutrition. Dauwalter is well known for wearing baggy long shorts for comfort, including during her racing. She is also known for embracing the "Pain Cave," the mental space she refers to when entering the most challenging parts of a race.

She has said she has reframed the "Pain Cave" as a place she wants to reach because it signifies where real work and growth happen.

Dauwalter's mother Tracy also has become involved in ultrarunning, the two running Javelina Jundred 100 km race in Fountain Hills, Arizona in 2023.

== Trail running ==
=== Early ultrarunning career, 2016–2018 ===
In 2016, Dauwalter set a course record at the Javelina Jundred 100K and won the Run Rabbit Run 100-mile race, finishing 75 minutes ahead of second place. She also won the 2017 Run Rabbit Run while battling temporary blindness when running the final 12 miles. She won the 2017 edition of the Moab 240 race in 2 days, 9 hours, and 59 minutes, finishing first overall and beating the second-place finisher by more than 10 hours. In 2017, she set the then-record for the longest run in 24 hours, at 155.391 miles during the Riverbank One Day Classic. In 2018, Dauwalter won the Western States 100-mile race, with a finishing time of 17h27m. She competed in Big's Backyard Ultra in 2018, finishing second overall and completing a total of 67 laps, setting the women's course record at 279.268 miles. She also placed second in the Tahoe 200, beating the previous women's course record by over 18 hours.

=== International wins and course records, 2019–2022 ===
In 2019, Dauwalter won the Ultra-Trail du Mont-Blanc in a time of 24 h 34 min 26 sec, coming in 21st overall. In 2021 she would return to set the women's course record. She competed for the United States at the IAU 24 Hour World Championship in Brive-la-Gaillarde, France in October 2019, finishing 12th. In 2020, she won the American section of Big's Backyard Ultra. She ran 68 laps for 283.3 miles for a finish time of 56 hours, 52 minutes, and 29 seconds, setting the record for the longest distance recorded by a female runner in the race. In 2021, Dauwalter entered the Hardrock 100 but did not finish. In 2022 and 2023 she entered again and won, beating the previous women's course records for the Hardrock 100 set by Diana Finkel by over an hour, in each direction.

=== Historic 2023 season ===
Her time for the Hardrock 100 in 2023 was 26:14:08, beating the previous counter-clockwise course record, as Hardrock changes the direction of its course each year, by an hour and four minutes. Also in 2023, she won the Western States 100, besting the previous women's course record set by Ellie Greenwood in 2012, finishing in a time of 15:29:34. This set the overall record for the Western States–Hardrock double. With this she became the first athlete to set course records at Western States and Hardrock in the same year. In September 2023, she then won the Ultra-Trail du Mont-Blanc again, making her the first person in history to win the triple of Western States, Hardrock, and UTMB in a single year.

=== Later career, 2024–present ===
In 2024, Dauwalter continued her winning streak by securing first place at the Mt. Fuji 100 Mile in Fujiyoshida, Japan, completing the 165.4 km race in 19:21:22 and finishing 3rd overall. She also won the Transgrancanaria in the Canary Islands, Spain, finishing the 126 km race in 15:14:54. In December 2025 she ran the California International Marathon beating her personal best with a time of 2:38:55. As of 2025, she was sponsored by Salomon. In 2026, she was selected to carry the Olympic flame torch during its journey across Italy ahead of the 2026 Winter Olympics. In March 2026, she took a late entry into Ultra Trail Chianti Castles by UTMB race and won it.

=== "Shortney" shorts ===
Dauwalter is famous for her distinctively long, "baggy" shorts, which she frequently wears during ultrarunning competitions. These shorts were dubbed "Shortney" shorts by Salomon, when it launched a "Shortney" capsule collection in 2023 including oversized technical trail shorts and a T-shirt. Her shorts have been described as making runners feel "rebellious" against the trend of shrinking women's running shorts.

=== Awards and recognition ===
Dauwalter was named Ultra Runner of the Year in 2018 by Ultrarunning Magazine after winning 9 of the 12 races that she entered, including two where she finished first overall. She was awarded Ultra Runner of the Year also in the years 2019, 2021, 2022 and 2023. In 2020, she received the George Mallory Award at the Wasatch Mountain Film Festival for pushing the boundaries of physical human achievement.

== Selected race results ==
Year	Competition	Venue	Position	Event	Result	Notes
2026	Ultra Trail Chianti Castles	Radda in Chianti, Italy	1st	118.9 km	11:31:55	10th overall; late entry after Tenerife Bluetrail by UTMB cancellation
2025	Lavaredo Ultra Trail	Cortina d’Ampezzo, Italy	1st	120 km	14:14:40	15th overall
2024	Hardrock 100	Silverton, CO, USA	1st	100 mi	26:11:49	Women's course record
2024	Mt. Fuji 100 Mile	Fujiyoshida, Japan	1st	100 mi	19:21:22	3rd overall, Women's course record
2024	Transgrancanaria	Canary Islands, Spain	1st	126 km	15:14:54	
2023	Ultra-Trail du Mont-Blanc	Chamonix, France	1st	100 mi	23:29:14	
2023	Hardrock 100	Silverton, CO, USA	1st	100 mi	26:14:12	Women's course record (ccw)
2023	Western States 100	California	1st	100 mi	15:29:34	Women's course record
2023	Bandera 100k	Texas	1st	100 km	8:59:34	WSER Golden Ticket
2023	Transgrancanaria	Canary Islands, Spain	1st	128 km	14:40:39	Women's course record
2022	Grand Raid	Réunion island	1st	164 km	24:37:47	
2022	Hardrock 100	Silverton, CO, USA	1st	100 mi	26:44:36	Women's course record (cw)
2022	Collegiate Loop Trail	Twin Lakes, Colorado, CO, USA	1st	160 mi	40:14	Fastest Known Time
2021	Ultra-Trail Cape Town	Cape Town, South Africa	1st	100 km	11:20:04	
2021	The Barkley Marathons	Frozen Head State Park, TN, USA	N/A	100 mi	DNF	
2021	Hardrock 100	Silverton, Colorado, USA	N/A	100 mi	DNF	
2021	Ultra-Trail du Mont-Blanc	Chamonix, France	1st	100 mi	22:30:54	Women's course record
2019	Ultra-Trail du Mont-Blanc	Chamonix, France	1st	100 mi	24:34:26	
2019	Tarawera Ultramarathon	Rotorua, New Zealand	1st	100 km	9:28:04	
2018	Western States 100	Olympic Valley, CA	1st	100 mi	17:27:00	
2018	Ultra-Trail Mt. Fuji	Shizuoka, Japan	1st	100 mi	23:57:48	
2018	Tahoe 200	Homewood, California	1st	200 mi	49:54:36	2nd overall
2018	Squamish 50	Squamish, British Columbia	1st	50 mi	8:22:15	Women's course record
2017	Moab 240	Moab, Utah	1st	240 mi	57:55:13	Overall win and course record
2016	Javelina Jundred	Fountain Hills, Arizona	1st	100 km	8:48:25	
2016	Run Rabbit Run	Steamboat Springs, Colorado	1st	100 mi	21:23:37	
2014	Ouray 100	Ouray, Colorado	1st	100 mi	26:46:20	
