= Anton Krupicka =

American ultra-runner (born 1983)

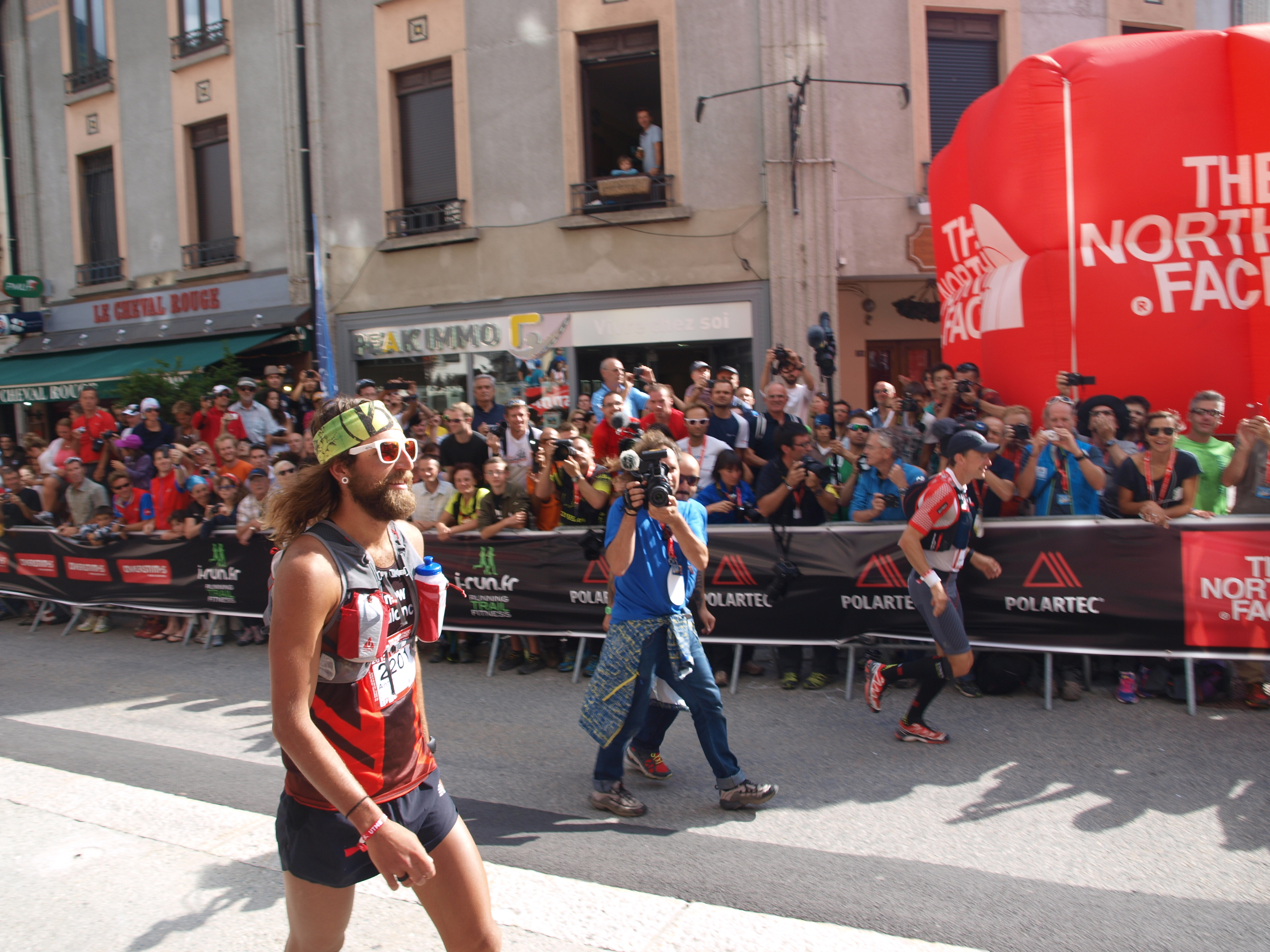
- Anton Krupicka heading to 2013's Ultra-Trail du Mont Blanc starting line

Personal information
- Nickname: Tony
- Born: August 2, 1983 (age 43) Nebraska
- Height: 5'10.5” (180 cm)
- Weight: 170 lb (77 kg)
- Website: https://antonkrupicka.substack.com/

Sport
- Country: United States
- Event: Ultramarathon
- Team: La Sportiva
- Turned pro: 2006
- Coached by: Self

Anton Krupicka (born 2 August 1983) is an American ultra-runner. He has won the Leadville 100 twice, the Miwok 100K, the Rocky Raccoon 100 Miler, the Collegiate Peaks 50 Miler, the White River 50 Miler twice (set 2010 CR 6:25:29), the High Mountain 50k and the Estes Park Marathon.

Krupicka has set 28 Fastest Known Time running records, including the speed record for the 28-mile Maroon Bells 4 Passes Loop in 2009. He also came in second in the Western States Endurance Run in 2010 in what would have been a course record time of 15:13:53.

Due to a running career highly influenced by injuries, Krupicka has branched out into other outdoor activities such as climbing, skiing, and especially biking. In August 2016, Krupicka and mountain climber Stefan Griebel set the fastest known time for the Longs Peak Triathlon, biking 79 miles from Boulder, Colorado, running 14 miles and climbing the Diamond on Longs Peak in 09:06:00.

In September 2024, Krupicka placed second in the Grindstone Trail Running Festival by UTMB 100 Miles, earning him qualification for the 2025 UTMB World Series final in Chamonix, France, his first appearance since 2014.

His surname is pronounced as "crew-pitch-kuh".

== Training and personal life ==
Krupicka is known for his long hair and beard as well as his minimalist approach to life. He often runs without a shirt and with very lightweight minimal running shoes. He ran his first marathon when he was twelve years old. During college and in his early 20s he often ran upwards of 200 miles a week. Krupicka is featured in the film Indulgence: 1000 Miles Under The Colorado Sky which chronicles his Summer 2007 training leading up to the Leadville Trail 100.

Krupicka grew up near Niobrara, Nebraska. He used to be a graduate student at the University of Colorado, but dropped out to be a professional runner. Krupicka earned his BA from Colorado College in 2005, double-majoring in physics and philosophy. In 2006, he completed a second BA at Colorado College in geology.
