= Angeles Crest 100 Mile Endurance Run =

Ultramarathon in California

The Angeles Crest 100-Mile Endurance Run, or AC100, is an annual ultramarathon spanning a total distance of 100 miles (162 kilometers) along trails through Angeles National Forest, located in Los Angeles County, California.

The course was originally designed to be a challenging 30-hour course, but due to its difficulty, the official cut-off time is set to 33 hours.

The race is limited to 150 participants; registrants must qualify for the event by completing at least one 50-mile run in the previous year.

== Course ==
The starting line of the AC100 is in Wrightwood, following portions of the Pacific Crest Trail up the slope of Mount Baden-Powell, continuing through the Silver Moccasin Trail, and the Gabrielino Trail. It finishes at Loma Alta Park in Altadena, California. The finishing line itself is located near NASA's Jet Propulsion Laboratory.

== History ==
The first event was held in 1986, and was mapped out by Del Beaudoin. Since then, the course has remained mostly consistent. The original finish line was the Rose Bowl in Pasadena through 1991. In 1992 the finish line was shifted to Johnson's Field in the Arroyo, adjacent to the Arroyo Seco. In 2008 the finish line was moved to Loma Alta Park, in Altadena.

Since the early 2000s the course has been extended an extra 1 mile around Cooper Canyon due to a closure enforced by the Forest Service to save the endangered Yellow-Legged Tree Frog.

The race was held in September until 2010, when the date as moved up August (except for 2011 and 2012, when it was held in July).

After the Station Fire cancelled the 2009 race, the race dates were changed in order to avoid the fire season.

When Jim O'Brien set the course record in 1989, the overall course was about 1 mile longer.

== Awards ==
Runners who cross the finish line in less than 24 hours receive the Silver Belt Buckle. The prize itself is made of sterling silver, with a varied percentage of AC100 participants successfully earning one each year.

All runners finishing between 24 hours and 25:05 hours receive the Second Sunrise Ram Buckle, made of solid bronze. Any runner who completes the race between 25:47 and 33 hours is awarded with the 33 Hour Ram Buckle. Additionally, all finishers receive an engraved metal plate, mounted upon a solid walnut plaque, as well a finisher T-shirt, regardless of finishing time .

== Course Records ==
Jim O'Brien, coach of Arcadia Boys' Cross Country team (ranked #1 in the U.S. and 2-time National Champions) until 2013, has held the men's course record since 1989 with a finish time of 17:35:48. Pam Smith holds the women's course record with her time of 21:04:18, which she achieved in 2014.

== Western Slam ==
This Angeles Crest 100-Mile Endurance Run is one of four 100-mile (160 km) endurance runs in the United States that comprise the "Western Slam," a feat entailing the completion the AC100 and the following three 100-mile (160 km) events:

- Leadville 100 in Colorado
- Western States 100 in Northern California
- Wasatch 100 in Utah
