= Allie Ostrander =

American long-distance runner (born 1996)

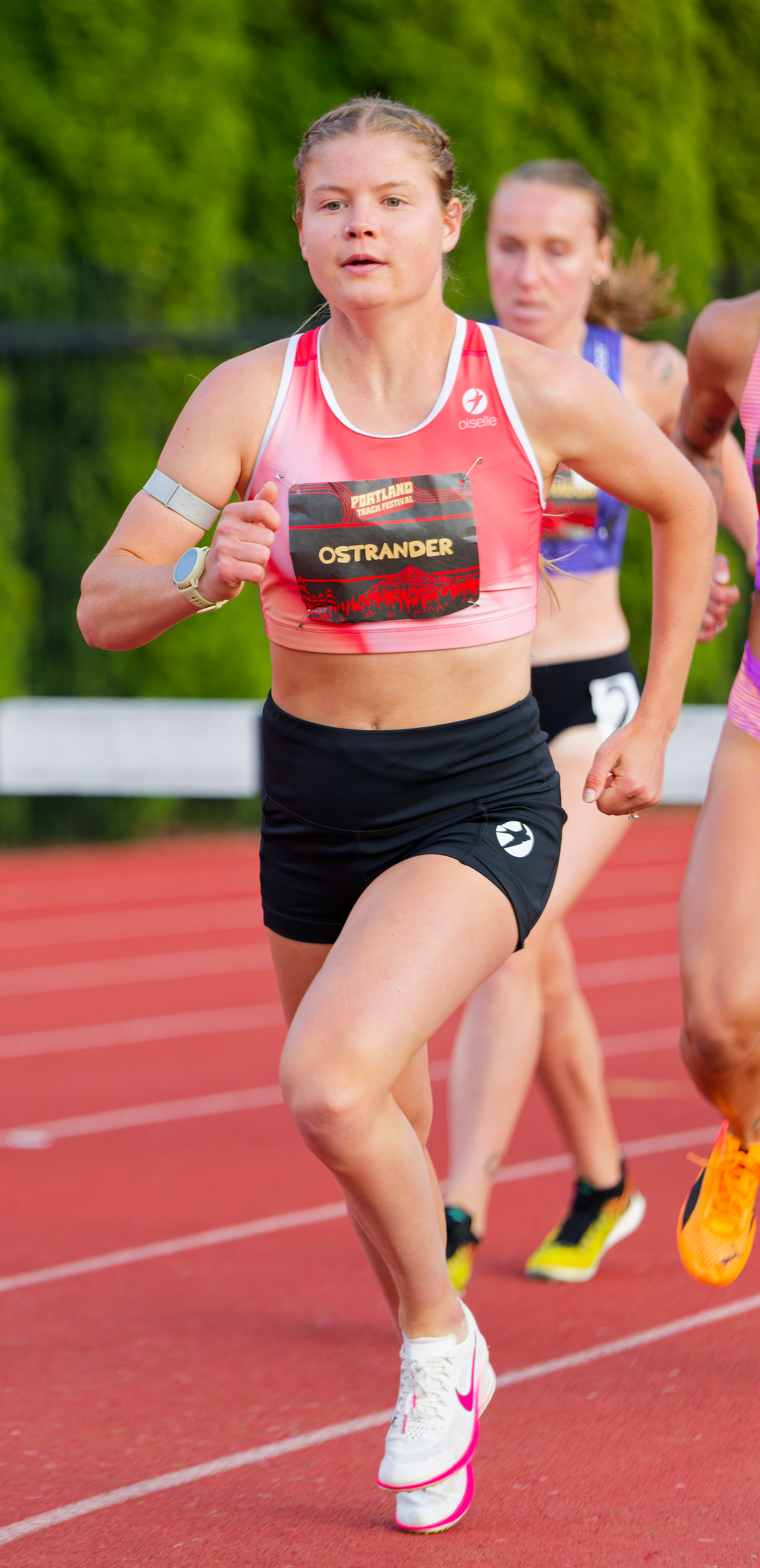
- Ostrander in 2025

Personal information
- Nationality: United States
- Born: December 24, 1996 (age 29) Kenai, Alaska, U.S.
- Height: 5 ft 3.5 in (161 cm)

Sport
- Sport: Track and field
- Events: 1500 m, 3000 m, 3000 m steeplechase, 5000 m, cross country, 10,000 m, mountain running
- College team: Boise State
- Turned pro: 2019
- Coached by: Corey Ihmels 15-19; Danny Mackey July 2019-2021; David Roche 2023-Present

Achievements and titles
- Personal bests: Outdoor 1500 m: 4:14.76 (2019); Mile: 4:33.5 (2019); 5000m: 15:16.38 (2018); 10,000m: 32:06.71 (2019); 3000 metres steeplechase: 9:21.82 (2024); Road; 5km: 15:10 (2026) Half Marathon: 1:08:52 (2026)

YouTube information
- Channel: Allie Ostrander
- Subscribers: 126 thousand
- Views: 83.0 million

Allison "Allie" Ostrander (born December 24, 1996) is an American long-distance runner. She was the NCAA Division I steeplechase champion in 2017, 2018 and 2019, competing for the Boise State University Broncos. In July 2019, Ostrander announced her plans to forgo her final season of NCAA eligibility and begin running professionally.

== Early life and education ==
Ostrander was born in Kenai, Alaska in 1996, the daughter of Teri and Paul Ostrander. Ostrander graduated from Kenai Central High School in 2015 and matriculated to Boise State University.

Ostrander has been involved in health and fitness from a young age, participating in sports since the age of five. She competed in varsity cross country and track in college while pursuing a degree in exercise science.

She worked as a children's camp director, sports instructor, and counselor. She also directed local races in her hometown.

== Running career ==
While as a youth she considered herself a soccer player, she took up the local challenge of the annual Mount Marathon Race. By 2008, she had the age 7-11 course record. She continued to win every year, setting the course records in the 12-14 division, 15-17 division and would have set the record in her first year in the adult women 18-29 division in 2015, except that was the year professional runner Emelie Forsberg visited to set the record. In high school, Ostrander competed on the basketball team along with running, where she was coached by her mother. Ostrander ran cross country, hurdles, and distance events. She won her first state 4A (large school) championship as a sophomore. In 2013, as a junior, Ostrander finished second to Alexa Efraimson, clocking 10:03.66 in the Arcadia Invitational 3200m in California. In 2014, her senior year, she won the Nike Cross Nationals.

Ostrander competed for the Boise State Broncos at the NCAA Division I level.

=== Collegiate ===
==== 2015 ====
In September 2015, Ostrander won the U20 World Mountain Running Championships in Betws-y-Coed, Wales, UK. Later that month, she finished second in the 6 km Roy Griak Invitational cross country race. On October 16, she won the Wisconsin Adidas Invitational 6 km in 19:19.5. Two weeks later, she won her Mountain West Conference championship, followed in another two weeks by an NCAA Division I West Region victory. On November 21, she finished as the runner up in the 2015 NCAA Division I Cross Country Championships in 19:33.6.

==== 2016 ====
In January, Ostrander set a personal best in the 5000 m, running 15:21.85 at the University of Washington Invitational. At the Husky Classic in February, she set a new personal best of 8:54.27 for 3000 meters. Later that month, she anchored her Broncos distance medley team to a first-place finish at the Mountain West Indoor Track and Field Championships. In July she finished in 8th place in the 5000 meters at the U.S. Olympic Trials.

==== 2017 ====
Ostrander won the Stanford invitational 3000 m steeplechase in 9:55.61. In May, at the Mountain West Championships, she won the 10000 m in a personal best time of 35:51.2. In June, she won the 2017 NCAA Division I Outdoor Track and Field Championships steeplechase title, in 9:41.31. In November, Ostrander finished second in the 6 kilometers in the NCAA West Region Championships, with a career best time of 19:16.5. She later finished fourth at the NCAA Championships on November 18.

==== 2018 ====
Running as a redshirt sophomore at the Mountain West Indoor Championships in February, she set a personal best for the mile run in 4:46.06, finished second in the 3,000 meters, and anchored Boise State's winning distance medley relay. On May 10, Ostrander finished less than a second behind Karissa Schweizer in the 2018 NCAA Division I Indoor Track and Field Championships at 3000 meters, running 8:54.35. On March 29, she won the Stanford Invitational 3000m steeplechase, with a new personal best of 9:38.57. At the Bryan Clay Invitational, she ran a new 1500 m personal best of 4:15.06, behind Olympian Shelby Houlihan but beating future Olympian Weini Kelati. At the Mountain West Outdoor Championships, she won the 5000 meters and finished second in the 1500 m. On May 25, Ostrander qualified for the NCAA Outdoor Track and Field Championships by winning the 3000 m steeplechase in at the NCAA West Preliminary Championships in Sacramento, California. A day later, she qualified for the 5000 meters, finishing second in her heat in a time of 15:27.46. In a repeat performance at the 2018 NCAA Outdoor Championships in Eugene, Ostrander won the 3000 m steeplechase. In the 5000 meter race about an hour later, she finished eighth.

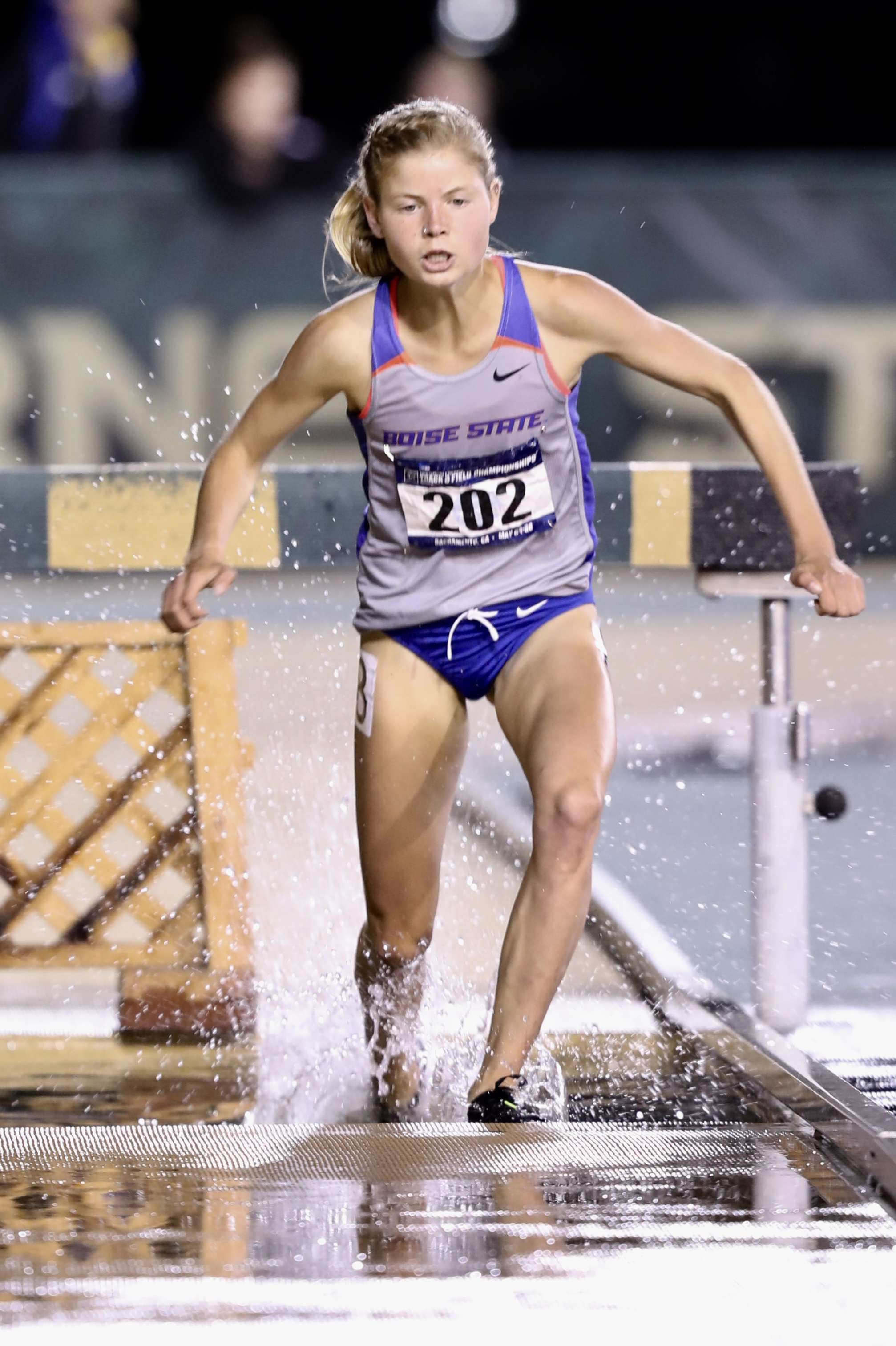
Ostrander at the 2018 NCAA West Regional

On November 9, Ostrander won the NCAA Division I West Region Cross Country Championships, in a personal best of 19:09.0. The Broncos finished second overall, four points behind Oregon. On November 17, along with Anna Rohrer, she led the tightly packed leaders through the first 4 kilometers of the NCAA Championships. She faded slightly toward the end, finishing sixth to Colorado's Dani Jones in 19:56.9. On December 1, she ran a personal best in the 5,000 meters of 15:16.38 at Boston University.

==== 2019 ====
On January 26, Ostrander broke the Boise State school record for the mile at the University of Washington Indoor Meet, running 4:35.79. Her distance medley team also set a school record, where Ostrander was the 1600 meter leg. At the Stanford Invitational on March 29, Ostrander competed in the 10,000m, finishing third in 32.06.7. On May 2, she returned to the steeple at the Payton Jordan Invitational in Stanford, California, to win 0.05 seconds ahead of New Mexico State's Adva Cohen. On June 8, as a redshirt junior, Ostrander repeated her NCAA 3000m steeplechase win, winning in a new personal best of 9:37.73, marking the first-ever woman to win the event three times in a row. On June 30, at the Prefontaine Classic, Ostrander ran a new 3000m steeplechase personal best of 9:31.44.

Ostrander finished her collegiate running career as Boise State's most-decorated student-athlete. She was inducted into the Boise State Athletics Hall of Fame in 2024.

=== Professional ===
==== 2019–2022 ====
After the 2019 Prefontaine Classic, Ostrander decided to forego her last seasons of collegiate eligibility to go professional. She signed contracts with agent Ray Flynn and with Brooks Running to become a member of the Brooks Beasts Track Club, under Danny Mackey.

On July 28, Ostrander finished fourth in the steeplechase at the 2019 USA Track & Field Outdoor Championships, in a time of 9:38.52. Because Emma Coburn, who ran 9:25.63, was the defending World Champion from 2017, and consequently was an automatic qualifier to the 2019 World Championships, Ostrander qualified to compete at the 2019 World Athletics Championships in Doha, Qatar.

On September 8, Ostrander competed in New York City's Fifth Avenue Mile, running 4:33.5 to finish 16th. In February 2020, she won the 3000 meters at the Millrose Games, in a personal best of 8:48.94, despite an achilles injury. At the 2019 World Championships, in the 3000m steeplechase, Ostrander ran a new personal best of 9:30.85 in her heat, barely missing the final.

On April 2, 2020, Ostrander received platelet-rich plasma (PRP) therapy to help accelerate the healing of her torn achilles tendon. She trained at altitude in New Mexico during this time. The same year, Ostrander began a volunteer coaching position with the NCAA DII distance running program at Seattle Pacific University.

In 2021, Ostrander ended her contract with Brooks in order to step away from professional running.

==== 2023-present ====
In February 2023, Ostrander signed a contract with NNormal. On August 25, 2023, Ostrander was suspended for 4 months by the USADA after testing positive for canrenone, a banned substance that's often used as a masking agent, on March 30, 2023. Ostrander claimed she was exposed to the substance through a prescription acne medicine, which she had not obtained a Therapeutic Use Exemption to use. During this year, Ostrander began to be coached by David Roche.

In January 2024, she got 4th at the 2024 USA Cross Country Championships allowing her to compete at the 2024 World Athletics Cross Country Championships in Belgrade, Serbia.

Ostrander won the 3000 meter steeplechase at the Portland Track Festival in June 2024, running a new personal best of 9:24.70. A few weeks later, she competed at the 2024 U.S. Olympic Track and Field Trials, finishing 7th in the 3000 meter steeplechase final, setting a new personal best of 9:21.82. She then moved to Boulder, Colorado to focus on training at altitude and continue her running career. In January 2025, Ostrander announced that she had signed a contract with Oiselle, and would continue to compete in track, road, and trail competitions.

In February 2025, Ostrander competed in a half marathon, finishing in 1:11:10.

In December 2025, Ostrander got 8th at the 2025 USA Cross Country Championships with a time of 34:34.

In January 2026, Ostrander competed in the Houston Half Marathon, finishing in 1:10:08 as the 18th overall female. This time stands as the fastest half marathon by an Alaskan.

In September 2026, she competed in the World Athletics Road Running Championships in Copenhagen Denmark, finishing 12th with a time of 15:10, establishing a new personal best.

== Competitions ==
Year	Competition	Venue	Position	Event	Notes
Representing Boise State University
2015	Wisconsin Adidas Invitational	Madison, Wisconsin	1st	Cross country running	19:19.5
2015	NCAA Women's Division I Cross Country Championship	Terre Haute, Indiana	2nd	Cross country running	19:33.6
2016	2016 United States Olympic Trials	Eugene, Oregon	8th	5000m	15:24.74
2017	Stanford Invitational	Palo Alto, California	1st	Steeplechase	9:55.61
2017	NCAA Women's Division I Outdoor Track and Field Championships	Eugene, Oregon	1st	Steeplechase	9:41.31
2017	NCAA Women's Division I Outdoor Track and Field Championships	Eugene, Oregon	4th	5000m	15:38.93
2017	NCAA Women's Division I Cross Country Championship	Louisville, Kentucky	4th	Cross country running	19:31.3
2018	NCAA Women's Division I Indoor Track and Field Championships	College Station, Texas	2nd	3000m	8:54.35
2018	Stanford Invitational	Palo Alto, California	1st	Steeplechase	9:38.57
2018	NCAA Women's Division I Outdoor Track and Field Championships	Eugene, Oregon	1st	Steeplechase	9:39.27
2018	NCAA Women's Division I Outdoor Track and Field Championships	Eugene, Oregon	8th	5000m	15:46.50
2018	NCAA Women's Division I West Cross Country Championship	Sacramento, California	1st	Cross country running	19:09.0
2018	NCAA Women's Division I Cross Country Championship	Madison, Wisconsin	8th	Cross country running	19:56.9
2019	Stanford Invitational	Palo Alto, California	3rd	10000m	32:06.71
2019	Payton Jordan Invitational	Palo Alto, California	1st	Steeplechase	9:45.66
2019	NCAA Women's Division I Outdoor Track and Field Championships	Austin, Texas	1st	Steeplechase	9:37.73
2019	NCAA Women's Division I Outdoor Track and Field Championships	Austin, Texas	16th	5000m	16:28.19
2019	Prefontaine Classic	Palo Alto, California	13th	Steeplechase	9:31.44
Representing the United States
2019	2019 World Championships in Athletics – Women's 3000 metres steeplechase	Doha, Qatar	17th	Steeplechase	9:30.85
2015	World Mountain Running Championships U20	Betws-y-Coed, United Kingdom	1st	4.7 km	19:44
Representing Brooks Beasts Track Club
2019	USA Track and Field Outdoor Championships	Des Moines, Iowa	4th	Steeplechase	9:38.52
2020	Millrose games (Indoor)	New York, New York	1st	3000m	8:48.04
2020	Last Chance Invitational (Indoor)	Boston, Massachusetts	8th	5000m	15:19.71
2021	2020 United States Olympic Trials	Eugene, Oregon	8th	Steeplechase	9:26.96
2022	USA Outdoor Track and Field Championships	Eugene, Oregon	16th	5000m	16:12.03
2023	Carlsbad 5000	Carlsbad, California	DQ	5 km	15:47
Representing NNormal
2024	USATF Cross Country Championships	Richmond, Virginia	4th	Cross country running	33:52.5
2024	Portland Track Festival	Portland, Oregon	1st	Steeplechase	9:24:70
2024	2024 United States Olympic Trials	Eugene, Oregon	7th	Steeplechase	9:21.82
2024	2024 USATF 10 km Trail Championships	Bentonville, Arkansas	2nd	Trail running	43:18
Representing Oiselle
2025	2025 USA Cross Country Championships	Portland, Oregon	8th	Cross country running	34:34.4
2026	2026 USATF Road 1 Mile Championships	Des Moines, Iowa	6th	Road running	4:30.3
2026	2026 USATF Road 5 km Championships	Indianapolis, Indiana	5th	Road running	15:16.48
2026	Deseret News 10k	Deseret News, Utah	1st	Road running	30:50
2026	World Athletics Road Running Championships	Copenhagen, Denmark	12th	Road running	15:10
2026	Valencia Half Marathon	Valencia, Spain	26th	Road running	1:08:52

== Honors ==
- 3× Mountain West Conference Female Athlete of the Year (2016–18)
- 2016, 2018, 2019 Honda Sports Award Finalist - Cross Country
- NCAA 5000m First-Team All-American
- Boise State Athletics Hall of Fame Class of 2024
- Alaska Sports Hall of Fame Class of 2024

== Critique of athletics coverage ==
In 2018, NCAA commentator Jill Montgomery referred to Ostrander as the "baby-faced assassin", and said she looked like she still played with "Barbie Dolls". Dwight Stones said, "She may look like she was just playing with her 'Barbies,' but she's the reigning National Champ."

In 2019, Ostrander wrote, "This year, the commentators found it necessary to state (incorrectly I might add) my height and weight multiple times. Not only were these comments objectifying and unnecessary, they drew attention away from the real focus of the event. People attend this event and listen to the commentary because they want to see what we're capable of, not what we look like we're capable of. So why do the commentators insist on providing information that has nothing to do with the sport? In a sport where eating disorders and body dysmorphia are so common, the media has an opportunity to help women (and men) feel capable and powerful and worthy, but by focusing on appearance and body proportions, this opportunity is missed."

ESPN subsequently responded with a statement regarding the comments in question, saying: "We greatly appreciate Allie bringing this important conversation to light. Commentary about height & weight was not broadcast on ESPN."

== Personal life ==
Ostrander has an older sister, Taylor, who was a runner at NCAA Division III Willamette University.

Ostrander frequently competes in the Mount Marathon Race in Seward, Alaska, which she began running in grade school. She won the half-distance, junior version of the race six consecutive times from 2009 to 2014. In 2015, in her first senior race, Ostrander finished under the standing 25-year-old female record, but was beaten by world skyrunning champion Emelie Forsberg. In 2017, Ostrander won with her best time to date, 49:19.

In 2021, Ostrander was hospitalized for treatment of an unspecified eating disorder. She had previously run in the 2021 Olympic Trials, setting a personal best of 9:26.96 for the 3000m steeplechase while finishing in 8th place in the finals. She uses social media to raise awareness about eating disorders and provide support to runners experiencing similar challenges.

Her husband is Spencer Brown, a former Brooks Beasts middle-distance runner and host of YouTube channel The Athlete Special.
