= Fernanda Maciel =

Brazilian ultrarunner

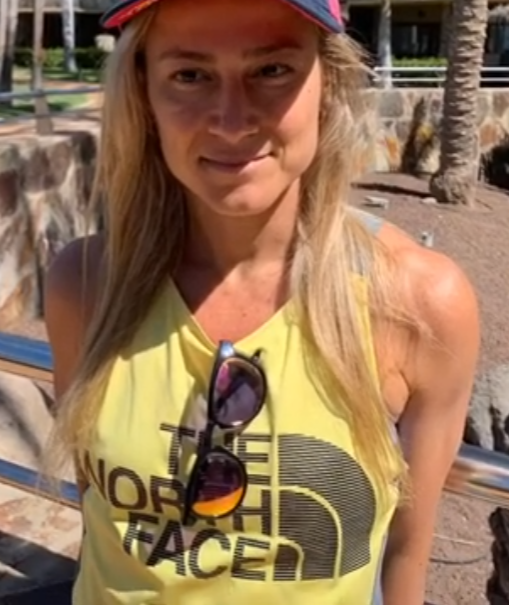
- At Transgrancanaria 20

Personal information
- Born: c. 1980 Belo Horizonte, Brazil
- Education: Environmental law at FUMEC University
- Occupation: Professional runner
- Years active: 2009-current
- Height: 5 ft 2 in (157 cm)
- Website: fernandamaciel.com

Sport
- Sport: Skyrunning
- Team: The North Face, Red Bull GmbH
- Turned pro: 2009

Fernanda Maciel (born c. 1980) is a Brazilian skyrunner and former environmental lawyer. She is known for her quest to set the fastest known time on the world's Seven Summits. She has held women's speed records on summits of Aconcagua, Kilimanjaro, Mount Vinson, Mount Elbrus and Carstensz Pyramid.

== Biography ==
Fernanda Maciel grew up in Belo Horizonte, Brazil into a family of jiu-jitsu and capoeira fighters. As a child, she began running to avoid having to take the bus to school and to support her training as a gymnast. Maciel became an elite athlete at a young age, competing in gymnastics competitions by age 8. By age 10, she was training in gymnastics in the United States. She later turned to running full time, choosing skyrunning as she found her race times in the mountain were just as good as her race times on the track. Maciel used her winnings from running competitions to fund her education as an environmental lawyer, which she pursued to help support her family. Maciel earned a law degree from FUMEC University.

In 2006, Maciel moved to New Zealand for a year, which inspired her to look beyond her law career. After returning to Brazil, in 2008 she ran her first ultramarathon and competed in adventure races. Maciel later left her law practice to devote herself to her athletic career full time.

In 2009, Maciel began to compete at the elite level in skyrunning, later placing first at competitions including the Ultra-Trail du Mont-Blanc, the Lavaredo and Trans Gran Canaria. That year, she moved to Spain to compete on the international circuit.

Maciel competes at the elite level in skyrunning, over distances of 100 miles and more. In 2016 she became a sponsored athlete by The North Face. That year, she placed third in Marathon des Sables. In 2017, she broke a bone and ligament in her hand, but continued to race. She would place third once more in Marathon des Sables. In February 2021, Maciel suffered a severe head injury while ice climbing that disrupted her training and caused her to lose sensation in the left side of her body. After recovery she has returned to competition.

Maciel later moved to Chamonix, France where she trains at high altitude. In 2021, Maciel was chosen to represent #TheHumanRace, a United Nations Development Programme campaign to raise awareness of climate change and the importance of supporting the environment. She became the first woman to run the entirety of the Camino de Santiago Compostela, covering 860km in 10 days and the first woman to run the entirety of Argentina’s Aconcagua.

=== Seven Summits project ===
In 2016, she began her Seven Summits project, aiming to set the fastest known time for women on each of the continent's highest peaks and to raise awareness of environmental issues facing the wilderness. Since beginning her project, Maciel has set women's speed records for five of the world's Seven Summits. In 2022, her summit of Mount Vinson was the fastest summit of the mountain for both men and women. Maciel's ultrarunning Seven Summits project is supported by Red Bull.

=== Speed records ===
- 22 February 2016, Aconcagua – 22h 52m 0s
- 25 September 2017, Kilimanjaro – 10h 6m
- 28 April 2019, Elbrus – 7h 40m 0s
- 24 December 2022, Vinson – 9h 41m 38s
- 17 October 2024, Puncak Jaya / Carstensz Pyramid – 1h 48m
