= Tom Green (runner) =

American long-distance runner

Tom Green (born 1950/1) is an ultra-runner and the first man to complete the Grand Slam of Ultrarunning. He earned this distinction when there were only five 100-mile trail races in the United States.

He joined the Howard County Striders and is now in their hall of fame for his accomplishments. As a Strider, Tom has completed more than 175 ultramarathons.

Green is known as "grandfather of ultrarunning", and the "original ultrarunner"

He has run over 280 ultramarathons.

He previously attended Concord University.

Green is a carpenter by trade.

In 2014, Tom Green ran 100 miles (160 km) in the Western States Endurance Run and finished in under 30 hours. He was 63 years old.

On April 20, 2015, Green was trimming a branch from a tree and the branch fell and hit Green in the head 'like a baseball bat' Green was airlifted to a hospital and received multiple skull fractures and some inner ear damage. His carotid artery received some damage. Upon reaching the Shock Treatment Center in Baltimore, Maryland, he was put into a medically induced coma for two weeks.

In September 2017, Green finished the Yeti 100 Endurance Run with a time of 29:46:43.
