= Ian Sharman =

Ian Sharman, born 30 August 1980, is a British-American ultramarathon runner, coach, podcaster and writer for Ultra Running Magazine living in Bend, OR. He currently holds the record for the Grand Slam of Ultrarunning and is the winner of the 2013, 2015, 2016 and 2017 Leadville Trail 100. He previously held nine Guinness Book of World's records for running marathons in costumes in the fastest time.
