= Leadville Trail 100 =

Ultramarathon in Colorado

- Date: August 18–19
- Location: Leadville, Colorado
- Event type: Ultramarathon trail run
- Distance: 100-mile (160 km)
- Established: 1983
- Course records: David Roche 15:12:30 (2025); Anne Flower 17:58:19 (2025)
- Website: www.leadvilleraceseries.com

The Leadville Trail 100 Run (aka The Race Across The Sky or the LT100) is an ultramarathon held annually in mid August on rugged trails and dirt roads near Leadville, Colorado, through the heart of the Rocky Mountains. First run in 1983, the race course climbs and descends 15,744 feet (4,799 m). In most years, fewer than half the starters complete the race within the 30-hour time limit.

== Course ==
The course is a 50-mile (80 km) out-and-back dogleg run primarily on the Colorado Trail, starting at 10,200 feet (3,100 m). The centerpiece of the course is the climb up to Hope Pass at 12,532 feet (3,820 m), encountered on both the outbound trek and on the return.

== History and records ==
In the early 1980s Colorado Ultra Club president Jim Butera had the idea of creating a 100 mile run in Colorado. When Aspen and Vail showed no interest Butera found support by Lake County Commissioner Ken Chlouber to hold the event in Leadville as a way to bring in visitors after the closing of the Climax Molybdenum Mine. Butera designed the course and the first running was held on August 27–28, 1983, with Butera serving as race director with the assistance of Chlouber and Merilee Maupin.

In 2001, the race organizers created the Leadville Trail 100 Legacy, a nonprofit organization dedicated to promoting welfare of Lake County residents. In 2010, Chlouber sold the Leadville Trail organization and its associated events to Life Time Fitness.

Leadville is one of the four 100-milers in the United States that make up the "Western Slam", completing four western 100-mile (160 km) events: the Leadville 100, the Western States 100 in northern California, the Wasatch Front 100 in Utah, and the Angeles Crest 100 in southern California. Leadville is also a part of the Grand Slam of Ultrarunning (the Vermont 100, Western States 100, Leadville and the Wasatch Front 100, originally Old Dominion 100 instead of Vermont) and an optional part of the Rocky Mountain Slam (Hardrock 100 plus three of four other races in the Rocky Mountains: Leadville, the Bear 100, the Bighorn 100, or the Wasatch Front 100). Leadville is also one of the valid qualifying events for the Western States 100. Unlike many other 100-mile races, Leadville has no qualifying standards. Entrance can be gained through an open lottery, via select qualifying races, through charitable donations, by signing up for coaching and/or the Leadville Run camp, or as a member of Life Time Fitness.

Leadville was the venue for the American debut of the Tarahumara runners of Mexico. In 1992 the Tarahumara first showed up to run outside their native environs. Wilderness guide Rick Fisher and ultra-runner Kitty Williams brought some of them to Leadville. However the experiment went bust. The problem, it turned out, was psychosocial, i.e. an unfamiliarity with the trail and the strange ways of the North. The Indians stood shyly at aid stations, waiting to be offered food. They held their flashlights pointed skyward, unaware that these "torches" needed to be aimed forward to illuminate the trail ahead. All five Tarahumara dropped out before the halfway point. The Tarahumara teams came back in 1993 and 1994 and won the Leadville event outright both years. In 1993, 52-year-old Tarahumara runner Victoriano Churro came in first, followed by 41-year-old teammate Cerrildo in second. In 1994, a five-man Tarahumara team took on Ann Trason in a much-publicized race in the ultrarunning community. Twenty-five-year-old Tarahumara runner Juan Herrera won in a record time of 17:30. His mark stood for 8 years until broken by Chad Ricklefs in 2002 (17:23), then again by Paul DeWitt in 2004, then again by Matt Carpenter in 2005, and finally by David Roche in 2024.

=== Notable finishers ===
The winner of the first race in 1983 was Skip Hamilton of Aspen, CO., in a time of 20:11:18

David Roche is the current course record holder for the Leadville Trail 100 Race. His 2024 time of 15 hours, 26 minutes, and 34 seconds in 2024 shattered the 19 year record previously held by Matt Carpenter. He bettered his time by just over 14 minutes in 2025, with a time of 15:12:30.

Ann Trason held the female LT100 record, 18:06:24, for 31 years, set in 1994. Trason is widely recognized as one of the greatest ultrarunners of all time, and nearly won the race outright in 1994. In 2025 it was broken by Anne Flower in a time of 17:58:19. Charles Williams holds the record of the oldest man to ever complete the race, which he did at the age of 70 in 1999. He was featured in the August 1999 issue of GQ magazine, which compared his training for the race to that of a professional football player.

Bill Finkbeiner became the first person to receive the "Leadville 2000-Mile Buckle" for twenty LT100 finishes in 2003. Finkbeiner has a total of 30 consecutive finishes, starting in 1984. In 2014, Kirk Apt finished his 20th Leadville 100. In 2026, Eric Pence finished the race for the 31st time, moving into first on the all time finishers list.

== Results ==
Key: Course record
Men's Winners

Year	Winner	Time	Age	State/Country
2026	Adrian Macdonald	15:47:23	37	Colorado
2025	David Roche	15:12:30	37	Colorado
2024	David Roche	15:26:34	36	Colorado
2023	JP Giblin	17:07:25	29	Colorado
2022	Adrian Macdonald	16:05:44	33	Colorado
2021	Adrian Macdonald	16:18:19	32	Colorado
2020	Cancelled due to the COVID-19 pandemic			
2019	Ryan Smith	16:33:24	40	Colorado
2018	Rob Krar	15:51:57	41	Arizona
2017	Ian Sharman	17:34:51	36	England
2016	Ian Sharman	16:22:39	35	England
2015	Ian Sharman	16:33:53	34	England
2014	Rob Krar	16:09:32	37	Arizona
2013	Ian Sharman	16:30:02	32	England
2012	Thomas Lorblanchet	16:29:28	30	France
2011	Ryan Sandes	16:46:54	20	South Africa
2010	Duncan Callahan	17:43:25	27	Colorado
2009	Timmy Parr	17:27:23	27	Colorado
2008	Duncan Callahan	18:02:39	25	Colorado
2007	Anton Krupicka	16:14:35	24	Nebraska
2006	Anton Krupicka	17:01:56	23	Nebraska
2005	Matt Carpenter	15:42:59	41	Colorado
2004	Paul DeWitt	17:16:19	36	Colorado
2003	Paul Dewitt	17:58:45	35	Colorado
2002	Chad Ricklefs	17:23:18	35	Colorado
2001	Steve Peterson	17:40:53		Colorado
2000	Chad Ricklefs	18:07:57	33	Colorado
1999	Steve Peterson	18:47:31	37	Colorado
1998	Steve Peterson	18:29:21	36	Colorado
1997	Steve Peterson	18:10:45	35	Colorado
1996	Steve Peterson	19:29:56	34	Colorado
1995	Kirk Apt	20:33:05	33	Colorado
1994	Juan Herrera	17:30:42	25	Mexico
1993	Victoriano Churro	20:03:33	52	Mexico
1992	Rick Spady	19:51:10	40	Colorado
1991	Steve Mahieu	19:38:04	44	Colorado
1990	Jim O'Brien	17:55:57	37	Colorado
1989	Sean Crom	18:56:40	33	Colorado
1988	Rick Spady	18:04:03	36	Colorado
1987	Skip Hamilton	18:44:55	42	Colorado
1986	Skip Hamilton	19:26:09	41	Colorado
1985	Jim Howard	19:15:57	30	California
1984	Skip Hamilton	18:43:50	39	Colorado
1983	Skip Hamilton	20:11:18	38	Colorado

Women's Winners

Year	Winner	Time	Age	State/Country
2026	Mckendree Hickory	19:39:12	38	Colorado
2025	Anne Flower	17:58:19	35	Colorado
2024	Mary Denholm	18:23:51	37	Colorado
2023	Jacquie Mannhard	21:24:55	38	Colorado
2022	Clare Gallagher	19:37:57	30	Colorado
2021	Annie Hughes	21:06:58	23	Colorado
2020	Cancelled due to the COVID-19 pandemic			
2019	Magdalena Boulet	20:18:06	46	California
2018	Katie Arnold	19:53:40	46	New Mexico
2017	Devon Yanko	20:46:29	35	California
2016	Clare Gallagher	19:00:27	24	Colorado
2015	Elizabeth Howard	19:34:09	43	Texas
2014	Emma Roca	19:38:04	41	Spain
2013	Ashley Arnold	20:25:42	26	Colorado
2012	Tina Lewis	19:33:44	30	Colorado
2011	Lynette Clemons	19:59:06	30	Colorado
2010	Elizabeth Howard	21:19:48	38	Texas
2009	Lynette Clemons	20:58:01	35	Colorado
2008	Helen Cospolich	23:21:53	31	Colorado
2007	Tammy Stone	22:44:54	45	Colorado
2006	Diana Finkel	20:43:19	34	Colorado
2005	Nikki Kimball	20:28:21	34	Montana
2004	Anthea Schmid	20:50:05	32	Colorado
2003	Valerie Caldwell	22:54:16		New Mexico
2002	Anthea Schmid	19:44:24	30	Colorado
2001	Janet Runyan	21:47:44		Colorado
2000	Amanda McIntosh	22:16:17	35	Texas
1999	Amanda McIntosh	22:05:22	34	Texas
1998	Ann Trason	20:58:32	37	California
1997	Julie Arter	24:08:07	36	Colorado
1996	Martha Swatt-Robison	23:30:11	34	Colorado
1995	Linda Lee	22:59:01	39	Colorado
1994	Ann Trason	18:06:24	33	California
1993	Christine Gibbons	20:55:59	31	Colorado
1992	Theresa Daus-Weber	23:37:23	37	Colorado
1991	Alice Thurau	22:10:35	35	Colorado
1990	Ann Trason	20:38:51	29	California
1989	Kathy D'Onofrio	20:50:41	25	Colorado
1988	Ann Trason	21:40:26	27	California
1987	Randi Young	24:12:57	35	Colorado
1986	Maureen Garty	22:45:01	36	Colorado
1985	Marge Hickman	26:57:50	35	Colorado
1984	Teri Gerber	28:17:41	35	California

== Leadville Race Series ==
The LT100 is one of six races presented under the Leadville Trail 100 banner. The other five events are as follows:

- Leadville 10K Run: This is an open event the week before the main Trail 100 race, comprising the first and last portions of the full Trail 100 course.
- Leadville Trail 100 MTB: This mountain bike race was added in 1994. The race was the idea of Tony Post, then a marketing vice president at the Rockport Company, sponsor of the event who arranged for television coverage for both races. The first mountain bike race drew just 150 entrants, while the 2009 edition allowed 1400 entrants. This USA Cycling-sanctioned race is held on a course that roughly parallels the LT100 run course, with some sections in common. It is held the same weekend as the 10K, and has attracted cyclists including Dave Wiens, Lance Armstrong and Floyd Landis. In 2010, Levi Leipheimer won the Leadville Trail 100 MTB in a then record time of 6:16:37, breaking the previous course record of 6:28:50 set in 2009 by Armstrong. The current course record is 5:20:26, set in 2026 by Keegan Swenson and Matthew Wilson. Swenson has won the last six editions of the race.
- Silver Rush 50 MTB: This race is a USAC-sanctioned 50-mile (80 km) mountain bike race through the mining districts east of Leadville in late July.
- Silver Rush 50 Run: This is a 50-mile trail run introduced in 2008 that follows the same route as the MTB course. The event occurs the day after the MTB event. Competitors who complete both Silver Rush events are recognized with a Silver Queen or Silver King award.
- Leadville Trail Marathon: This is a 26.2-mile (42.2 km) marathon through the mining districts east of Leadville, is held in June each year. The midpoint of the course is at Mosquito Pass, with an altitude of 13,185 feet (4,019 m). In 2006, a "heavy" half marathon event of 15 miles was added, which is run on the same day and also goes to the top of Mosquito Pass.

A competitor who officially finishes the Trail 100 Run, Trail 100 MTB, the Marathon, the Silver Rush bike or run, and the 10K is called a "Leadman" or "Leadwoman", a title which nods to the Ironman Triathlon. Charles Bybee currently holds the most Leadman titles, with 10 years of finishing all events (2007-2010, 2012–2017). In 2015, Junko Kazukawa completed the Grand Slam of Ultrarunning and the Leadwoman series, becoming the first person to complete both events in a single year. In 2019 Dion Leonard became the first male to complete the Grand Slam of Ultrarunning and the Leadman series in one year.

All events of the 2020 edition of the race series were cancelled due to the coronavirus pandemic, with all registrants given a deferral and a refund option for each race.

== See also ==
- Leadville Trail 100 MTB
