= Núria Picas =

Catalan ultramarathon runner (born 1976)

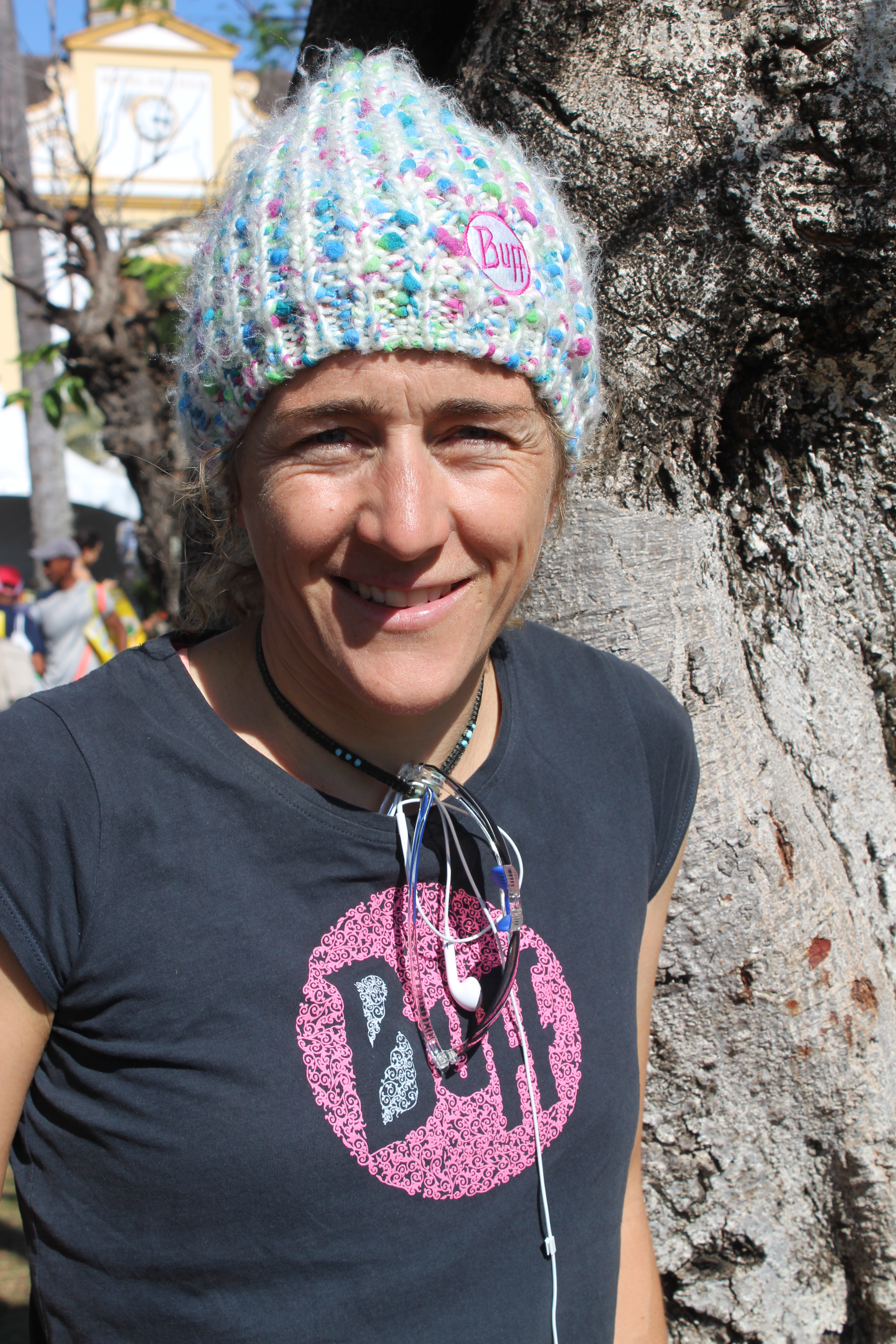

Personal information
- Full name: Núria Picas Albets
- Nationality: Spanish
- Born: 2 November 1976 (age 49) Manresa

Sport
- Country: Spain
- Sport: Skyrunning; Trail running

Núria Picas (born 2 November 1976) is a Spanish female sky runner and trail runner, who won title at the 2012 Skyrunner World Series in SkyUltra.

== Selected results ==
Edition	Rank	Race	Distance	Date	Time
27th	2nd place, silver medalist(s)	(Spain) Transvulcania	83.3 km	12 May 2012	8:51:59
29th	1st place, gold medalist(s)	(France) Grande Course des Templiers	72 km	28 October 2012	7:16:58
19th	2nd place, silver medalist(s)	(Spain) Transvulcania	83.3 km	11 May 2013	8:19:30
19th	2nd place, silver medalist(s)	(France) (Italy) (Switzerland) Ultra-Trail du Mont-Blanc	168 km	30 August 2013	24:32:20
27th	1st place, gold medalist(s)	(France) Grande Course des Templiers	73 km	27 October 2013	7:57:49
15th	1st place, gold medalist(s)	(Spain) Transgrancanaria	125 km	1 March 2014	16:44:55
13th	1st place, gold medalist(s)	(Japan) Ultra-Trail Mt.Fuji	100 mi	25 April 2014	23:27:34
13th	1st place, gold medalist(s)	The North Face 100 Australia	100 km	17 May 2014	10:57:46
29th	2nd place, silver medalist(s)	(France) (Italy) (Switzerland) Ultra-Trail du Mont-Blanc	168 km	29 August 2014	24:54:29
28th	1st place, gold medalist(s)	(France) Grande Course des Templiers	73 km	26 October 2014	7:51:46
18th	3rd place, bronze medalist(s)	(New Zealand) Tarawera Ultramarathon	100 km	7 February 2015	9:40:48
14th	1st place, gold medalist(s)	(Spain) Transgrancanaria	125 km	7 March 2015	16:53:27
12th	1st place, gold medalist(s)	(France) Grand Raid	167 km	22 October 2015	28:10:35
41st	3rd place, bronze medalist(s)	(France) Grande Course des Templiers	76 km	23 October 2016	8:22:42
20th	1st place, gold medalist(s)	(China) Hong Kong 100	100 km	14 January 2017	11:18:57
41st	1st place, gold medalist(s)	(France) (Italy) (Switzerland) Ultra-Trail du Mont-Blanc	167 km	1er September 2017	25:46:43
