= Grand Slam of Ultrarunning =

Series of 100-mile endurance runs in the U.S.

The Grand Slam of Ultrarunning is a set of four of the five most prestigious and oldest 100-mile races contested in the United States, comprising the Old Dominion 100 Mile Endurance Run in Virginia, the Western States 100 in California, the Vermont 100 Mile Endurance Run in Vermont, the Leadville Trail 100 in Colorado, and the Wasatch Front 100 Mile Endurance Run in Utah. A small number of people manage to complete four in one calendar year.

== History ==
The first runner to complete the Grand Slam was Tom Green, 35, of Maryland in 1986 in a combined time of 96 hours, 26 minutes, and 28 seconds. At the time, there were only 4 100-mile races in North America. These were the Old Dominion 100 in Virginia, Western States, Leadville, and Wasatch. Two runners completed the series in 1987 and three in 1988. In 1989, the Vermont 100 was added to the series, and runners could choose between it and Old Dominion. Starting in 2003, Old Dominion was removed from the series. In 2008, Western States was cancelled due to forest fires and the Arkansas Traveller 100 was run in its place. Starting in 2017, Old Dominion was once again added to the series and runners have to complete the Wasatch Front 100 Mile Endurance Run and three of the other four races to achieve the award.

Today about a dozen runners complete the Grand Slam each year. Entry is limited by lotteries at Vermont, Western States, Leadville, and Wasatch. From 1986 through 2017 there have been 345 official finishers. The fastest time as of 2017 was 69:49:38 by Ian Sharman, 33 of Oregon in 2013. Complete list of finishers. 2013 finishers. In 2015, Junko Kazukawa completed the Grand Slam and the Leadwoman series, becoming the first woman to complete both events in a single year. In 2019, Dion Leonard completed the Grand Slam and the Leadman series, becoming the first man to complete both events in a single year.

== Controversy ==
Entry into the Grand Slam is administered by the race committee for the Wasatch 100, which is also the last race in the series, normally held in early September. In 2017 entry costs $80 and must be received before the start of the first race (Western States) in late June. Entered runners who complete the first three races are guaranteed entry into Wasatch without having to go through the lottery. Runners who complete all four races but who do not enter the series are not officially recognized.

Year	Name	Old Dominion	Western States	Vermont	Leadville	Wasatch	Total time
2002	Sam Voltaggio, 51, TX	25:19:00	28:59:24	26:08:21	29:00:46	34:27:21	117:46:31
2004	Rob Apple, 43, TN		29:11:37	28:46:07	29:07:32	35:08:24	122:13:40
2005	Rob Apple, 44, TN		28:48:32	27:43:32	29:42:28	35:15:46	121:30:18
2010	Pete Stevenson, 37, CO		18:58:42	21:48:28	24:36:46	32:56:19	98:20:15
2013	Nick Clark, 39, CO		16:56:23	15:54:32	17:06:29	20:24:26	70:21:50

On August 30, 2013, this page was removed, possibly out of concern that Nick Clark might set a course record without being officially recognized when Wasatch was to be held on Sept. 6-7, 2013. In addition, the following text was added to http://www.run100s.com/gs.htm

MESSAGE FROM THE GRAND SLAM OF ULTRARUNNING™ COMMITTEE AND THE WASATCH 100 RACE COMMITTEE
The Grand Slam of Ultrarunning™ Committee and the Wasatch Front 100 Mile Endurance Run Committee do not endorse, recognize, or ratify anyone or their times involved in the so-called “unofficial” grand slam of ultrarunning. Likewise we do not support, encourage, or sustain anyone involved in this pursuit.
We continue to recognize, applaud, and award the runners who are legitimately registered in and officially complete The Grand Slam of Ultrarunning™.
We also remind all who are observing or otherwise involved that the term “Grand Slam of Ultrarunning™” is a trademark of The Grand Slam of Ultrarunning™ entity, and only those who are official entrants and finishers of The Grand Slam of Ultrarunning™ are entitled to use the term “Grand Slam of Ultrarunning™” in whatever form (including in any form that might cause trademark confusion) in connection with their running endeavors.

Kieren McCarthy questioned the legality of the Wasatch committee taking ownership of the trademark rights, noting that the other races in the series are open to anyone and that the trademark is not registered.
