= Hans Troyer =

American long-distance runner

Personal information
- Born: 16 February 2000 (age 26) Atlanta, Georgia, United States
- Height: 1.70 m (5 ft 7 in)
- Weight: 57 kg (126 lb)

Sport
- Country: United States
- Events: ultramarathon, trail running
- College team: Augusta University (NCAA Division II)
- Team: Hoka One One

Hans Troyer (born February 16, 2000) is an American professional ultramarathon runner.

== Career ==
From Newnan, Georgia, Troyer was one of three brothers, originally choosing running as a way to stay in shape for football. After attending Trinity Christian High School He went on scholarship to Augusta University, where he later competed as a steeplechaser.

His college career would see him break the school's 10000-meter record and also be named to the PBC Team Of Academic distinction, as well as break multiple other school records. He was named All-Region in the 3000m steeplechase in 2023.

After time away from the sport, spending time as a graduate assistant, Troyer made a rapid ascension in the ultrarunning scene in 2024, setting two course records in his first races. He would then attract further attention by breaking the USA Track & Field 50 Mile Championship course record by 12 minutes, which would form the basis of a documentary commissioned about his rise. He would later set another course record in that year's Bandera 100k.

Troyer continued this into 2025, winning the JFK 50 Mile in the second-fastest time ever, causing him to be referred to as 'arguably America's best ultramarathon athlete'. He would also win the Bandera 50k, Blue Ridge 50k, and the Way Too Cool 50k that year, which, coupled with a second-placed finish in The Canyons 100k race, allowed him enter the Western States 100 for the first time, where he placed eighth. For these efforts, he was named fifth in Ultra Running's 2025 Ultrarunner of the Year.

In February 2026, Troyer won the Black Canyon 100k, once again setting a course record, this time by more than five minutes.
