= Clare Gallagher =

American ultramarathon runner

Personal information
- Born: 1991 or 1992 (age 34–35) Colorado, United States
- Education: Princeton University

Sport
- Sport: Ultra running

Clare Gallagher (born 1991 or 1992) is an American ultrarunner and environmental advocate. She is a past winner of both the Leadville 100 and Western State 100 races.

== Early life ==
Gallagher grew up in the suburbs of Denver, Colorado, where she and her family often spent weekends in the mountains. She attended Princeton University where she studied ocean health and was influenced by ethicist Peter Singer. At one point Gallagher planned to go to medical school. She graduated from Princeton in 2014.

== Running career ==
Gallagher ran at Princeton but lost interest in running. She spent a couple of years in Thailand after college on a teaching fellowship. While in Thailand she won an 80-kilometer race in October 2014 having never run more than 10k previously. After her fellowship ended Gallagher moved to Boulder, Colorado and became active in the local trail running community.

Notable race results
Year	Race	Finish	Notes
2014	Thailand Ultramarathon	1st	inaugural race
2016	Dirty 30 50K	2nd	
2016	US 30K Championships	2nd	
2016	Aspen Power of Four 25K	1st	
2016	Leadville 100	1st	second-fastest all-time (19:00:27)
2017	Ultra-Trail du Mont-Blanc CCC	1st	course record
2017	The North Face Endurance Challenge 50 Mile Championships	2nd	
2019	Western States 100	1st	second-fastest all-time (17:23:25)
2022	Black Canyon 100k	1st	
2022	Leadville 100	1st	19:37:57
2022	Chuckanut 50k	1st	04:07:34

== Advocacy work ==
Gallagher is an advocate for issues such as climate change and the environment. She is an ambassador for Winter Wildlands Alliance and is involved with Protect Our Winters (POW). She won Western States in 2019 shortly after going on a two-week mountaineering expedition in the Arctic National Wildlife Refuge to advocate for the ANWR.

Gallagher won the Best of the Rockies—Advocate award from Elevation Outdoors Magazine in 2020 for her work as a Patagonia ambassador and POW athlete. The magazine noted that "she is a constant voice for climate action, social justice, and public lands."

Since 2015 Gallagher is a member of Giving What We Can, a community of people who have pledged to give at least 10% of their income to effective charities.
