= Barro Preto =

Municipality of Bahia, Brazil

Coordinates: 14°48′36″S 39°28′15″W

- Municipality
- Interactive map of Barro Preto
- Country: Brazil
- Region: Nordeste
- State: Bahia

Population (2020)
  - Total: 5,448
- Time zone: UTC−3 (BRT)

Barro Preto (formerly Governador Lomanto Júnior) is a municipality in the state of Bahia in the North-East region of Brazil.

== See also ==
- List of municipalities in Bahia
