= FUMEC University =

Private university in Belo Horizonte, Brazil

FUMEC University - Universidade FUMEC
- Fundação Mineira de Educação e Cultura
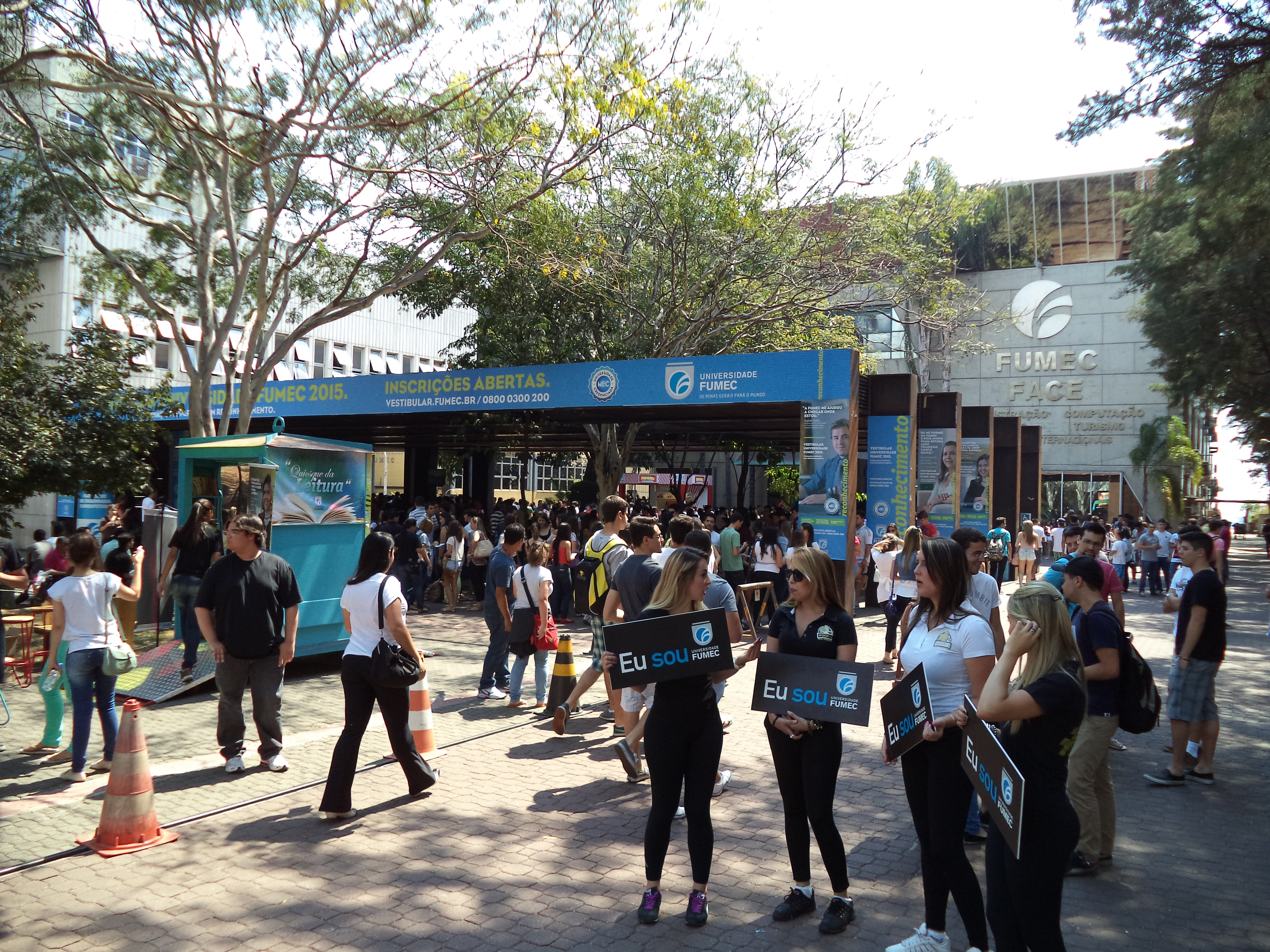
- Type: Private, non-profit
- Established: 1965
- Location: Belo Horizonte (headquarters), Minas Gerais, Brazil; 19.9437°S 43.9253°W
- Campus: Urban
- Colors: Blue and grey
- Website: www.fumec.br/

Universidade FUMEC (Fundação Mineira de Educação e Cultura, FUMEC University) is a private and non-profit Brazilian university in Belo Horizonte, state of Minas Gerais.

With its 50th anniversary coming FUMEC is part of the group of best universities in the state of Minas Gerais, ranking the second highest private university in the state according to General Index of Courses provided by Ministry of Education, and RUF(Brazilian Universities Ranking) which is the main study regarding universities in Brazil.

== Numbers ==
- 15,000 students undergraduate and Graduate Students;
- Faculty: 72% have Masters and Ph.D’s;
- Technical and Administrative support: 504 employees;
- FUMEC University invests more than R$970,000.00 a year in outreach projects encouraging interdisciplinary activities and services for the benefit of the community;
- FUMEC University invests R$2,641,000.00 a year of its funds in research projects in several areas such as Engineering | Health Sciences | Applied Social Sciences | Human Sciences;
- Agreements with 38 foreign universities in 18 different countries.

== Undergraduate majors ==
- Accounting
- Aeronautic Engineering
- Aeronautical Sciences
- Aesthetics
- Architecture and Urbanism
- Bioenergetics Engineering
- Biomedicine
- Biomedical Engineering
- Business Administration
- Chemical Engineering
- Civil Engineering
- Civil Production Engineering
- Communication/Advertising
- Communication/Journalism
- Computer Engineering
- Computer Science
- Design
- Electrical Engineering
- Environmental Engineering
- Fashion Design
- International Business
- Law
- Mechanical Engineering
- Pedagogy
- Photography
- Psychology
- System Engineering
- Telecommunication Engineering

== Undergraduate online majors ==
- Accounting
- Business Administration
- Pedagogy
- Information Systems
- Production Engineering
- Physical Education

== Technical undergraduate majors ==
- Trade Management
- Information Technology Management
- Human Resources Management (e-learning available)
- Private Securities Management (e-learning only)
- Computer Networks
- Internet Systems
- Financial Management
- Digital Games
- Logistics
- Aircraft Maintenance
- Marketing
- Multimedia Production

== Postgraduation and MBA programs ==
- MBA in Public Management (Presence and e-learning)
- MBA in Strategic Marketing (Presence and e-learning)
- MBA in Strategic Marketing
- MBA in Capital Markets and Investor Relations
- MBA in Strategic Security of Big Events
- MBA in Sustainability and Natural Resource Management
- Fashion Design
- Civil Production Engineering
- Workplace Safety Engineering
- MBA in Sustainable Buildings: Design and Performance
- Waste Management of Degraded Areas / Contaminated
- Paving and Road Restoration
- Exercise Physiology and Sports Coaching
- Systematization of Nursing (e-learning)
- Executive MBA in Business Management
- MBA in Corporate Finance and Controlling
- MBA in Tourism Business Management
- MBA in Accounting with an emphasis on international standards (IFRS / CPC)
- MBA in Strategic Project Management
- MBA in International Business Management
- MBA in Strategic Logistics Management
- MBA in Strategic Business Management (Presence and e-learning)
- MBA in Strategic Management of People (Presence and e-learning)

== Master and Ph.D. programs ==
- Master and Ph.D in Business Administration
- Master in Civil Construction
- Master in Law
- Master and Ph.D Information Systems and Knowledge Management

== See also ==
- Brazil University Rankings
- Minas Gerais
- Universities and Higher Education in Brazil
