= Transgrancanaria =

Long-distance race on the Canary Islands

- Location: (Spain) Gran Canaria
- Distance: 125-130 km
- Website: www.transgrancanaria.net

Transgrancanaria is a long-distance race that is held annually on Gran Canaria, one of the Canary Islands. It was the first ultramarathon in Spain, and remains a popular and demanding mountain-ultramarathons on the international calendar. The route of the Transgrancanaria Classic has a course length of 115–130 km (71–81 mi), with a cumulative elevation gain of 6,750–8,500 m (22,150–27,890 ft).

The race has taken place since 2003, with the participation of many international runners. It is a Spartan Trail world championship event.

== Records ==
Records across years are not exactly comparable, since the course route and length change significantly from year to year, but the course records are:

Name		Time	Distance	Year
Pau Capell Gil	M	12:42:40	128 km	2019
Courtney Dauwalter	F	14:40:39	128 km	2023
