= Vermont 100 Mile Endurance Run =

Ultramarathon race in the United States

The Vermont 100 Mile Endurance Run (Vermont 100) is a 100-mile (162 km) long ultramarathon held annually in July at Silver Hill Meadow in West Windsor, Vermont. It is one of the five 100-mile races that comprise the Grand Slam of Ultrarunning and one of only two hundred mile races in northern New England. It is also the only known ultra race in the USA where entrants run alongside horses over a similar course, in a separate but simultaneous race. (Horses avoid some of the more treacherous single-track and technical trails.) The race has been held every year since 1989.

The race, which was founded by Mike Howe and Laura Farrell, is a fundraising event put on by and in support of Vermont Adaptive Ski and Sports (VASS), a non-profit that provides sports and recreational opportunities to people with disabilities.

== The Course ==
The majority of the course runs on dirt roads with the remainder on hiking trails and a few miles of pavement. There is up to 15,000 feet of elevation gain and loss.

Current course records:

Men	Brian Rusiecki	2014	14:47:35
Women	Kami Semick	2010	16:42:32

Note: The Vermont 100 used to follow a different course prior to 2004, and keeps separate records for the old and new courses.
