= List of Central American and Caribbean records in athletics =

Central American and Caribbean records in athletics are the best marks set in an event by an athlete who competes for a member nation of the Central American and Caribbean Athletic Confederation (CACAC). CACAC doesn't maintain an official list for such performances. All bests shown on this list are tracked by statisticians not officially sanctioned by the governing body.

== Outdoor ==
Key to tables:

# = not ratified by federation

=== Men ===
Event	Record	Athlete	Nationality	Date	Meet	Place	Ref.	Video
50 m	5.47+ (+0.9 m/s)	Usain Bolt	Jamaica	16 August 2009	World Championships	Berlin, Germany		
60 m	6.31+ (+0.9 m/s)	Usain Bolt	Jamaica	16 August 2009	World Championships	Berlin, Germany		
100 y	9.07+ (−0.5 m/s) ^{[WB]}	Asafa Powell	Jamaica	27 May 2010	Golden Spike Ostrava	Ostrava, Czech Republic		
100 m	9.58 (+0.9 m/s)	Usain Bolt	Jamaica	16 August 2009	World Championships	Berlin, Germany		
150 m (bend)	14.44+ (−0.3 m/s)	Usain Bolt	Jamaica	20 August 2009	World Championships	Berlin, Germany		
150 m (straight)	14.35 (+1.1 m/s)	Usain Bolt	Jamaica	17 May 2009	Manchester City Games	Manchester, United Kingdom		
200 m	19.19 (−0.3 m/s)	Usain Bolt	Jamaica	20 August 2009	World Championships	Berlin, Germany		
200 m (straight)	19.88 (+0.3 m/s)	Steven Gardiner	Bahamas	20 May 2018	Adidas Boost Boston Games	Boston, United States		
300 m	30.97	Usain Bolt	Jamaica	27 May 2010	Golden Spike Ostrava	Ostrava, Czech Republic		
400 m	43.48	Steven Gardiner	Bahamas	4 October 2019	World Championships	Doha, Qatar		
500 m	59.32	Orestes Rodriguez	Cuba	5 February 2013		La Habana, Cuba		
600 m	1:13.9 h	Raidel Acea	Cuba	20 April 2013		La Habana, Cuba		
800 m	1:42.85	Norberto Téllez	Cuba	31 July 1996	Olympic Games	Atlanta, United States		
1000 m	2:17.0 #	Byron Dyce	Jamaica	15 August 1973		Copenhagen, Denmark		
1500 m	3:35.03	Maurys Surel Castillo	Cuba	7 June 2012	8th Meeting Iberoamericano de Atletismo	Huelva, Spain		
Mile	3:57.34	Byron Dyce	Jamaica	1 July 1974		Stockholm, Sweden		
Mile	3:57.34	Juan Luis Barrios	Mexico	17 July 2013	Morton Games	Finglas, Ireland		
2000 m	5:00.4+	Luis Grijalva	Guatemala	17 September 2023	Prefontaine Classic	Eugene, United States		
3000 m	7:27.63	Eduardo Herrera	Mexico	16 May 2026	Shanghai Diamond League	Keqiao, China		
Two miles	8:21.98	Luis Grijalva	Guatemala	21 August 2021	Prefontaine Classic	Eugene, United States		
5000 m	12:50.58	Luis Grijalva	Guatemala	30 May 2024	Bislett Games	Oslo, Norway		
5 km (road)	13:18	Armando Quintanilla	Mexico	31 March 1996	Carlsbad 5000	Carlsbad, United States		
10,000 m	27:08.23	Arturo Barrios	Mexico	18 August 1989	ISTAF	Berlin, Germany		
10 km (road)	27:41 #	Arturo Barrios	Mexico	1 March 1986	Continental Homes 10K	Phoenix, United States		
15 km (road)	42:36 #	Arturo Barrios	Mexico	29 June 1986		Portland, United States		
20,000 m (track)	56:55.6	Arturo Barrios	Mexico	30 March 1991		La Fléche, France		
20 km (road)	58:26+ #	Juan Carlos Romero	Mexico	11 October 2009	World Half Marathon Championships	Birmingham, United Kingdom		
One hour	21101 m	Arturo Barrios	Mexico	30 March 1991		La Fléche, France		
Half marathon	1:00:14 a	Armando Quintanilla	Mexico	21 January 1996	World Half Marathon Championships	Tokyo, Japan		
Half marathon	1:00:28 #	German Silva	Mexico	24 September 1994		Oslo, Norway		
25 km (road)	1:16:26+	Andrés Espinosa	Mexico	28 September 2003	Berlin Marathon	Berlin, Berlin		
25 km (road)	1:14:54+ #	Juan Luis Barrios	Mexico	6 March 2011	Lala Marathon	Torreón, Mexico		
30 km (road)	1:30:19+ #	Juan Luis Barrios	Mexico	6 March 2011	Lala Marathon	Torreón, Mexico		
30 km (road)	1:31:46+ #	Andrés Espinosa	Mexico	28 September 2003	Berlin Marathon	Berlin, Germany		
Marathon	2:07:19 a	Andrés Espinosa	Mexico	18 April 1994	Boston Marathon	Boston, United States		
Marathon	2:08:30 #	Dionicio Cerón	Mexico	2 April 1995	London Marathon	London, United Kingdom		
110 m hurdles	12.87 (+0.9 m/s)	Dayron Robles	Cuba	12 June 2008	Golden Spike Ostrava	Ostrava, Czech Republic		
200 m hurdles (straight)	22.61 (+1.4 m/s)	Félix Sánchez	Dominican Republic	17 May 2014	Manchester City Games	Manchester, United Kingdom		
300 m hurdles	34.94	Yeral Nuñez	Dominican Republic	1 April 2023	Felix Sánchez Classic	Santo Domingo, Dominican Republic		
400 m hurdles	47.02	Rai Benjamin	Antigua and Barbuda	8 June 2018	NCAA Division I Championships	Eugene, United States		
2000 m steeplechase	5:28.56	Alexander Greaux	Puerto Rico	7 June 2005		Huelva, Spain		
3000 m steeplechase	8:25.69	José Salvador Miranda	Mexico	9 July 2000		Barakaldo, Spain		
High jump	2.45 m	Javier Sotomayor	Cuba	27 July 1993		Salamanca, Spain		
Pole vault	5.90 m	Lázaro Borges	Cuba	29 August 2011	World Championships	Daegu, South Korea		
Long jump	8.71 m (+1.9 m/s)	Iván Pedroso	Cuba	18 July 1995		Salamanca, Spain		
Triple jump	18.08 m (±0.0 m/s)	Pedro Pablo Pichardo	Cuba	28 May 2015	Copa Cuba-Memorial Barrientos	Havana, Cuba		
Shot put	23.08 m	Rajindra Campbell	Jamaica	5 September 2026	Memorial Van Damme	Brussels, Belgium		
Discus throw	72.01 m	Ralford Mullings	Jamaica	16 August 2025	Oklahoma Throw Series	Ramona, United States		
Hammer throw	78.02 m	Roberto Janet	Cuba	28 May 2015	Copa Cuba-Memorial Barrientos	Havana, Cuba		
Javelin throw	93.07 m	Anderson Peters	Grenada	13 May 2022	Doha Diamond League	Doha, Qatar		
Decathlon	8784 pts	Ayden Owens-Delerme	Puerto Rico	20–21 September 2025	World Championships	Tokyo, Japan		
Decathlon	100m (wind) / Long jump (wind) / Shot put / High jump / 400m / 110m H (wind) / Discus / Pole vault / Javelin / 1500m; 10.31 (+0.2 m/s) / 7.32 m (+0.4 m/s) / 15.55 m / 1.96 m / 46.46 / 13.65 (+1.1 m/s) / 46.12 m / 5.10 m / 58.79 m / 4:17.91							
5000 m walk (track)	18:35.36	Eder Sánchez	Mexico	2 July 2014	Myting lekkoatletyczny AWF Katowice	Katowice, Poland		
10,000 m walk (track)	38:26.4	Daniel García	Mexico	17 May 1997		Sønder-Omme, Denmark		
10 km walk (road)	38:31	Eder Sánchez	Mexico	19 September 2009	IAAF Race Walking Challenge Final	Saransk, Russia		
20,000 m walk (track)	1:17:25.6	Bernardo Segura	Mexico	7 May 1994		Bergen, Norway		
20 km walk (road)	1:17:46	Julio Martínez	Guatemala	8 May 1999	Oder-Neisse Grand Prix	Eisenhüttenstadt, Germany		
35 km walk (road)	2:25:08	Andres Olivas	Mexico	16 March 2025	World Athletics Race Walking Tour	Nomi, Japan		
50,000 m walk (track)	3:41:38.4 #	Raúl González	Mexico	25 May 1979		Bergen, Norway		
50 km walk (road)	3:41:09	Erick Barrondo	Guatemala	23 March 2013	Dudinska 50-ka	Dudince, Slovakia		
4 × 100 m relay	36.84	Nesta Carter; Michael Frater; Yohan Blake; Usain Bolt	Jamaica	11 August 2012	Olympic Games	London, United Kingdom		
4 × 200 m relay	1:18.63	Nickel Ashmeade; Warren Weir; Jermaine Brown; Yohan Blake	Jamaica	24 May 2014	IAAF World Relays	Nassau, Bahamas		
Swedish relay	1:46.59	Puma Reggae Team; Christopher Williams (100m); Usain Bolt (200m); Davian Clarke (300m); Jermaine Gonzales (400 m)	Jamaica	25 July 2006	DN Galan	Stockholm, Sweden		
4 × 400 m relay	2:56.72	Chris Brown; Demetrius Pinder; Michael Mathieu; Ramon Miller	Bahamas	10 August 2012	Olympic Games	London, United Kingdom		
Sprint medley relay (2,2,4,8)	3:19.25	Chad Walker (200 m); Rasheed Dwyer (200 m); Rusheen McDonald (400 m); Daniel Glave (800 m)	Jamaica	27 April 2019	Penn Relays	Philadelphia, United States		
4 × 800 m relay	7:21.12		Mexico	24 May 2014	IAAF World Relays	Nassau, Bahamas		
Distance medley relay	10:00.41	Edgar Quiroz 3:03.66 (1200 m); Jose Fraire 48.15 (400 m); Bryan Martinez 1:55.13 (800 m); Christopher Sandoval 4:13.47 (1600 m)	Mexico	26 April 2014	Penn Relays	Philadelphia, United States		
Marathon road relay (Ekiden)	2:03.48	David Galindo (14:07); Victor Rodríguez (30:15); Jesús Primo (14:55); Benjamín Paredes (29:35); Ruben García (14:24); Martín Rodríguez (20:32)	Mexico	14 April 1996		Copenhagen, Denmark		

=== Women ===
Event	Record	Athlete	Nationality	Date	Meet	Place	Ref.
60 m	7.02 (+1.7 m/s)	Elaine Thompson	Jamaica	28 January 2017	Queens Grace Invitational	Kingston, Jamaica	
100 y	9.91+ (+1.1 m/s) ^{[WB]}	Veronica Campbell Brown	Jamaica	31 May 2011	Golden Spike Ostrava	Ostrava, Czech Republic	
100 m	10.54 (+0.9 m/s)	Elaine Thompson-Herah	Jamaica	21 August 2021	Prefontaine Classic	Eugene, United States	
150 m (bend)	16.09+ (+0.2 m/s)	Shericka Jackson	Jamaica	8 September 2023	Memorial van Damme	Brussels, Belgium	
150 m (straight)	16.23 (−0.7 m/s)	Shaunae Miller-Uibo	Bahamas	20 May 2018	Adidas Boost Boston Games	Boston, United States	
200 m	21.41 (+0.1 m/s)	Shericka Jackson	Jamaica	25 August 2023	World Championships	Budapest, Hungary	
200 m straight	21.76 (+0.5 m/s)	Shaunae Miller-Uibo	Bahamas	4 June 2017	Boost Boston Games	Somerville, United States	
300 m	34.41 ^{[WB]}	Shaunae Miller-Uibo	Bahamas	20 June 2019	Golden Spike Ostrava	Ostrava, Czech Republic	
400 m	47.98	Marileidy Paulino	Dominican Republic	18 September 2025	World Championships	Tokyo, Japan	
600 m	1:22.63 A	Ana Fidelia Quirot	Cuba	25 July 1997		Guadalajara, Mexico	
800 m	1:54.44	Ana Fidelia Quirot	Cuba	9 September 1989		Barcelona, Spain	
1000 m	2:33.21	Ana Fidelia Quirot	Cuba	13 September 1989		Jerez de la Frontera, Spain	
1500 m	4:01.84	Yvonne Mai-Graham	Jamaica	25 July 1995	Herculis	Fontvieille, Monaco	
Mile	4:24.64	Yvonne Mai-Graham	Jamaica	17 August 1994	Weltklasse Zürich	Zürich, Switzerland	
Mile (road)	4:29.30 Wo	Adelle Tracey	Jamaica	19 September 2026	World Road Running Championships	Copenhagen, Denmark	
3000 m	8:37.07	Yvonne Mai-Graham	Jamaica	16 August 1995	Weltklasse Zürich	Zürich, Switzerland	
Two miles	9:15.74	Laura Galván	Mexico	27 May 2022	Prefontaine Classic	Eugene, United States	
5000 m	15:04.32	Adriana Fernández	Mexico	17 May 2003	Adidas Oregon Track Classic	Portland, United States	
5 km (road)	15:32	Alondra Negron	Puerto Rico	31 December 2025	Cursa dels Nassos	Barcelona, Spain	
10,000 m	31:10.12	Adriana Fernández	Mexico	1 July 2000	Maine Distance Festival	Brunswick, United States	
10 km (road)	31:56 a #	Adriana Fernández	Mexico	3 August 2002		Cape Elizabeth, United States	
10 km (road)	32:20 #	Sara Cedillo	Mexico	1 December 2001		Mazatlán, Mexico	
20 km (road)	1:06:38+ #	Madaí Pérez	Mexico	22 October 2006	Chicago Marathon	Chicago, United States	
Half marathon	1:08:34 a	Olga Appell	Mexico	24 January 1993		Tokyo, Japan	
Half marathon	1:09:28 #	Adriana Fernández	Mexico	9 March 2003		Kyoto, Japan	
25 km (road)	1:23:26+	Madaí Pérez	Mexico	22 October 2006	Chicago Marathon	Chicago, United States	
30 km (road)	1:40:12+ #	Madaí Pérez	Mexico	22 October 2006	Chicago Marathon	Chicago, United States	
Marathon	2:22:59	Madaí Pérez	Mexico	22 October 2006	Chicago Marathon	Chicago, United States	
100 m hurdles	12.24 (−0.4 m/s)	Ackera Nugent	Jamaica	30 August 2024	Golden Gala	Rome, Italy	
200 m hurdles (straight)	24.86 (+0.1 m/s)	Shiann Salmon	Jamaica	23 May 2021	Adidas Boost Boston Games	Boston, United States	
300 m hurdles	38.69	Shiann Salmon	Jamaica	18 July 2026	KBC Night of Athletics	Heusden-Zolder, Belgium	
400 m hurdles	52.42	Melaine Walker	Jamaica	20 August 2009	World Championships	Berlin, Germany	
3000 m steeplechase	9:14.09	Aisha Praught	Jamaica	31 August 2018	Memorial Van Damme	Brussels, Belgium	
High jump	2.04 m	Silvia Costa	Cuba	9 September 1989		Barcelona, Spain	
Pole vault	4.91 m	Yarisley Silva	Cuba	2 August 2015	17th International Pole Vault Meeting	Beckum, Germany	
Long jump	7.16 m A (−0.1 m/s)	Elva Goulbourne	Jamaica	22 May 2004		Mexico City, Mexico	
Triple jump	15.29 m (+0.3 m/s)	Yamilé Aldama	Cuba	11 July 2003	Golden Gala	Rome, Italy	
Shot put	20.96 m	Belsy Laza	Cuba	2 May 1992		Mexico City, Mexico	
Discus throw	73.09 m	Yaime Pérez	Cuba	13 April 2024	Oklahoma Throws Series World Invitational	Ramona, United States	
Hammer throw	76.62 m	Yipsi Moreno	Cuba	9 September 2008	Hanžeković Memorial	Zagreb, Croatia	
Javelin throw	71.70 m	Osleidys Menéndez	Cuba	14 August 2005	World Championships	Helsinki, Finland	
Heptathlon	6742 pts	Yorgelis Rodríguez	Cuba	26–27 May 2018	Hypo-Meeting	Götzis, Austria	
Heptathlon	100m H (wind) / High jump / Shot put / 200m (wind) / Long jump (wind) / Javelin / 800m; 13.48 (+0.3 m/s) / 1.86 m / 14.95 m / 23.96 (−0.6 m/s) / 6.58 m (+2.3 m/s) / 48.65 m / 2:12.73						
Decathlon	7245 pts #	Magalys García	Cuba	28–29 June 2002		Vienna, Austria	
Decathlon	100m (wind) / Discus / Pole vault / Javelin / 400m / 100m H (wind) / Long jump (wind) / Shot put / High jump / 1500m						
10,000 m walk (track)	43:26.18	Graciela Mendoza	Mexico	7 October 1989		Hull, Canada	
10 km walk (road)	42:42	María Graciela Mendoza	Mexico	25 May 1997		Naumburg, Germany	
15 km walk (road)	1:05:14+	María Guadalupe González	Mexico	7 May 2016	World Race Walking Team Championships	Rome, Italy	
20,000 m walk (track)	1:34:56.7	Maria del Rosario Sánchez	Mexico	16 July 2000		Xalapa, Mexico	
20 km walk (road)	1:26:06	Alegna González	Mexico	20 September 2025	World Championships	Tokyo, Japan	
Half marathon walk (road)	1:32:15	Alegna González	Mexico	16 May 2026	33rd Grande Prémio Internacional de Rio Maior em Marcha	Rio Maior, Portugal	
35 km walk (road)	2:50:44	Alejandra Ortega	Mexico	24 August 2023	World Championships	Budapest, Hungary	
50 km walk (road)	4:13:56 A	Mirna Ortiz	Guatemala	24 February 2019	Central American Race Walking Championships	Guatemala City, Guatemala	
4 × 100 m relay	41.07	Veronica Campbell Brown; Natasha Morrison; Elaine Thompson; Shelly-Ann Fraser-Pryce	Jamaica	29 August 2015	World Championships	Beijing, China	
4 × 200 m relay	1:29.04	Jura Levy; Shericka Jackson; Sashalee Forbes; Elaine Thompson	Jamaica	22 April 2017	IAAF World Relays	Nassau, Bahamas	
Sprint medley relay (1,1,2,4)	1:36.67	Audra Segree (100 m); Natasha Morrison (100 m); Anastasia Le-Roy (200 m); Verone Chambers (400 m)	Jamaica	29 April 2017	Penn Relays	Philadelphia, Pennsylvania	
Swedish relay	2:03.42	Christania Williams (100 m); Shericka Jackson (200 m); Olivia James (300 m); Chrisann Gordon (400 m)	Jamaica	10 July 2011		Lille, France	
4 × 400 m relay	3:18.71	Rosemarie Whyte; Davita Prendergast; Novlene Williams-Mills; Shericka Williams	Jamaica	3 September 2011	World Championships	Daegu, South Korea	
Sprint medley relay (2,2,4,8)	3:34.56	Sherri-Ann Brooks (200 m); Rosemarie Whyte(200 m); Moya Thompson 51.7 (400 m); Kenia Sinclair 1:57.43 (800 m)	Jamaica	April 2009	Penn Relays	Philadelphia, United States	
4 × 800 m relay	8:15.84	Rose Mary Almanza; Arletis Thaureaux; Gilda Casanova; Sahily Diago	Cuba	3 May 2014	IAAF World Relays	Nassau, Bahamas	
4 × 1500 m relay	24:05.6	Isabel Dickison; Guadalupe Rivero; Norma Pérez; Isis Rodríguez	Cuba	13 May 1972		Havana, Cuba	

=== Mixed ===
Event	Record	Athlete	Nationality	Date	Meet	Place	Ref.
4 × 100 m relay	39.62	Ackeem Blake; Tina Clayton; Kadrian Goldson; Tia Clayton	Jamaica	3 May 2026	World Relays	Gaborone, Botswana	
4 × 400 m relay	3:09.82	Lidio Andrés Feliz; Marileidy Paulino; Alexander Ogando; Fiordaliza Cofil	Dominican Republic	15 July 2022	World Championships	Eugene, United States	

== Indoor ==
=== Men ===
Event	Record	Athlete	Nationality	Date	Meet	Place	Ref.	Video
50 m	5.61+	Michael Green	Jamaica	16 February 1997	Meeting Pas de Calais	Liévin, France		
50 m	5.61+	Freddy Mayola	Cuba	16 February 2000		Madrid, Spain		
55 m	5.99 A ^{[WB]}	Obadele Thompson	Barbados	22 February 1997		Colorado Springs, United States		
60 m	6.44 (heat)	Asafa Powell	Jamaica	18 March 2016	World Championships	Portland, United States		
60 m	6.44 (semifinal)	Asafa Powell	Jamaica	18 March 2016	World Championships	Portland, United States		
150 m	15.66	Lerone Clarke	Jamaica	11 February 2010	Botnia Games	Korsholm, Finland		
200 m	20.17	Wanya McCoy	Bahamas	14 March 2026	NCAA Division I Championships	Fayetteville, United States		
300 m	31.56	Steven Gardiner	Bahamas	28 January 2022	South Carolina Invitational	Columbia, United States		
400 m	44.80	Kirani James	Grenada	27 February 2011	SEC Championships	Fayetteville, United States		
500 m	1:00.62	Jaden Marchan	Trinidad and Tobago	31 January 2026	Penn State National Open	State College, United States		
600 y	1:06.68 OT	Jonathan Jones	Barbados	26 February 2022	Big 12 Championships	Ames, United States		
600 m	1:14.89	Handal Roban	Saint Vincent and the Grenadines	7 February 2026	Sykes Sabock Challenge	State College, United States		
800 m	1:44.73	Handal Roban	Saint Vincent and the Grenadines	14 February 2026	Sound Invite	Winston-Salem, United States		
1000 m	2:19.96	Mario Vernon-Watson	Jamaica	12 February 2000		Allston, United States		
1500 m	3:38.93+	Pablo Solares	Mexico	7 February 2009	Boston Indoor Games	Roxbury, United States		
Mile	3:54.52	Pablo Solares	Mexico	7 February 2009	Boston Indoor Games	Roxbury, United States		
3000 m	7:40.79	Kemoy Campbell	Jamaica	20 February 2016	Millrose Games	New York City, United States		
5000 m	13:14.45	Kemoy Campbell	Jamaica	26 February 2017	Boston University Last Chance Meet	Boston, United States		
50 m hurdles	6.36+	Anier García	Cuba	13 February 2000	Meeting Pas de Calais	Liévin, France		
55 m hurdles	7.05	Shamar Sands	Bahamas	24 January 2009		Gainesville, United States		
60 m hurdles	7.33	Dayron Robles	Cuba	8 February 2008	PSD Bank Meeting	Düsseldorf, Germany		
300 m hurdles	36.02 OT	Dinsdale Morgan	Jamaica	4 February 1998	Pirkkahall	Tampere, Finland		
400 m hurdles	48.78	Felix Sánchez	Dominican Republic	18 February 2012	Meeting National	Val-de-Reuil, France		
High jump	2.43 m	Javier Sotomayor	Cuba	4 March 1989	World Championships	Budapest, Hungary		
Pole vault	5.72 m	Lázaro Borges	Cuba	11 February 2012	Pole Vault Stars	Donetsk, Ukraine		
Long jump	8.62 m	Iván Pedroso	Cuba	7 March 1999	World Championships	Maebashi, Japan		
Triple jump	17.83 m	Aliecer Urrutia	Cuba	1 March 1997		Sindelfingen, Germany		
Shot put	22.16 m	Rajindra Campbell	Jamaica	23 February 2024	Villa de Madrid Indoor Meeting	Madrid, Spain		
Weight throw	21.60 m	Caniggia Raynor	Jamaica	6 February 2016	Mule Relays	Warrensburg, United States		
Discus throw	63.40 m	Fedrick Dacres	Jamaica	13 February 2016	ISTAF Indoor	Berlin, Germany		
Heptathlon	6518 pts A	Ayden Owens-Delerme	Puerto Rico	10–11 March 2023	NCAA Division I Championships	Albuquerque, United States		
Heptathlon	60m / Long jump / Shot put / High jump / 60m H / Pole vault / 1000m; 6.77 / 7.82 m / 15.27 m / 2.03 m / 7.73 / 4.96 m / 2:33.14							
Mile walk	5:24.50	Ever Palma	Mexico	8 February 2025	USA 1 Mile Race Walking Championships	New York City, United States		
5000 m walk	18:38.71	Ernesto Canto	Mexico	7 March 1987	World Championships	Indianapolis, United States		
4 × 200 m relay	1:25.63	Colin King; Kevon Rattray; Jermaine Browne; Andre Clarke	Jamaica	27 January 2018	Dr. Norb Sander Invitational	New York City, United States		
4 × 400 m relay	3:02.52	Renny Quow; Jereem Richards; Machel Cedenio; Lalonde Gordon	Trinidad and Tobago	4 March 2018	World Championships	Birmingham, United Kingdom		

=== Women ===
Event	Record	Athlete	Nationality	Date	Meet	Place	Ref.
50 m	6.00	Merlene Ottey	Jamaica	4 February 1994		Moscow, Russia	
55 m	6.65	Savatheda Fynes	Bahamas	8 March 1997		Indianapolis, United States	
60 m	6.94 A	Julien Alfred	Saint Lucia	11 March 2023	NCAA Division I Championships	Albuquerque, United States	
200 m	21.87	Merlene Ottey	Jamaica	13 February 1993		Liévin, France	
300 m	35.45	Shaunae Miller-Uibo	Bahamas	3 February 2018	Millrose Games	New York City, United States	
400 m	50.21	Shaunae Miller-Uibo	Bahamas	13 February 2021	New Balance Indoor Grand Prix	Staten Island, United States	
500 m	1:08.34	Leah Anderson	Jamaica	4 February 2023	New Balance Indoor Grand Prix	Boston, United States	
800 m	1:58.46	Natoya Goule	Jamaica	17 February 2022	Meeting Hauts-de-France Pas-de-Calais	Liévin, France	
1000 m	2:37.55	Natoya Goule	Jamaica	26 January 2019	Dr. Sander Columbia Challenge	New York City, United States	
1500 m	4:04.95	Aisha Praught-Leer	Jamaica	10 February 2018	New Balance Indoor Grand Prix	Roxbury, United States	
Mile	4:30.17	Adelle Tracey	Jamaica	8 February 2023	Copernicus Cup	Toruń, Poland	
3000 m	8:40.45	Laura Galván	Mexico	11 February 2023	Millrose Games	New York City, United States	
5000 m	16:08.60	Beverly Ramos	Puerto Rico	12 March 2010	NCAA Division I Championships	Fayetteville, United States	
50 m hurdles	6.67+	Michelle Freeman	Jamaica	13 February 2000	Meeting Pas de Calais	Liévin, France	
55 m hurdles	7.26+	Ackera Nugent	Jamaica	8 February 2025	Millrose Games	New York City, United States	
60 m hurdles	7.65	Devynne Charlton	Bahamas	3 March 2024	World Championships	Glasgow, United Kingdom	
60 m hurdles	7.65	Devynne Charlton	Bahamas	22 March 2026	World Championships	Toruń, Poland	
High jump	2.01 m	Ioamnet Quintero	Cuba	5 March 1993		Berlin, Germany	
Pole vault	4.82 m	Yarisley Silva	Cuba	24 April 2013	Drake Relays	Des Moines, United States	
Long jump	6.91 m	Elva Goulbourne	Jamaica	23 February 2002	SEC Championships	Fayetteville, United States	
Triple jump	15.05 m	Yargelis Savigne	Cuba	8 March 2008	World Championships	Valencia, Spain	
Shot put	19.60 m	Belsis Laza	Cuba	8 March 1989		Piraeus, Greece	
Weight throw	24.21 m	Candice Scott	Trinidad and Tobago	27 February 2005		Fayetteville, United States	
Pentathlon	4746 pts	Tyra Gittens	Trinidad and Tobago	11 March 2021	NCAA Division I Championships	Fayetteville, United States	
Pentathlon	60m H / High jump / Shot put / Long jump / 800m; 8.27 / 1.93 m / 13.86 m / 6.58 m / 2:28.22						
3000 m walk	12:40.33	Mirna Ortiz	Guatemala	18 February 2018	French Championships	Liévin, France	
4 × 200 m relay	1:34.83	Verone Chambers; Yanique Ellington; Sonequa Walker; Shavine Hodges	Jamaica	27 January 2018	Dr. Norb Sander Invitational	New York City, United States	
4 × 400 m relay	3:26.54	Patricia Hall; Anneisha McLaughlin; Kaliese Spencer; Stephenie Ann McPherson	Jamaica	9 March 2014	World Championships	Sopot, Poland	
4 × 800 m relay	8:17.75	Fellan Ferguson; Simoya Campbell; Kimarra McDonald; Natoya Goule	Jamaica	3 February 2018	Millrose Games	New York City, United States	
