= 2023 World Athletics Indoor Tour =

Indoor track and field meetings

- Edition: 8th
- Dates: 21 January – 11 March

The 2023 World Athletics Indoor Tour was the eighth edition of the World Athletics Indoor Tour, the highest series of international track and field indoor meetings.

The tour expanded in 2022 with the introduction of four tiers of competition labelled Gold, Silver, Bronze and Challenger in a mirror of the outdoor World Athletics Continental Tour. In 2023, the addition of further events means the tour now comprising 54 meetings in Europe, North America and Asia, and retains seven gold standard events, five in Europe and two in the United States.

For 2023 the Gold level scoring disciplines were: the men's 400m, 1500m, 60m, hurdles, high jump and long jump, as well as the women's 60m, 800m, 3000/5000m, pole vault, triple jump and shot put.

== Meetings ==
Date	Meeting	Venue	Country
GOLD Meetings (7)
27 January 2023	Init Indoor Meeting	Messehalle, Karlsruhe	Germany
4 February 2023	New Balance Indoor Grand Prix	The Track, Boston	United States
8 February 2023	ORLEN Copernicus Cup	Arena, Toruń	Poland
11 February 2023	Millrose Games	Armory Track, New York City	United States
15 February 2023	Meeting Hauts-de-France Pas-de-Calais	Arena Stade Couvert, Liévin	France
22 February 2023	World Indoor Tour Madrid	Gallur, Madrid	Spain
25 February 2023	Birmingham World Indoor Tour Final	Utilita Arena Birmingham, Birmingham	United Kingdom
SILVER Meetings (17)
21 January 2023	American Track League - Hawkeye Pro Classic	Iowa-Recreation Building, Iowa City	United States
23 January 2023	Astana Meeting	Track & Field complex Qazaqstan, Astana	Kazakhstan
27 January 2023	LILAC Grand Prix	The Podium, Spokane	United States
29 January 2023	ISTAF INDOOR Düsseldorf	ISS Dome, Düsseldorf	Germany
31 January 2023	Hvězdy v Nehvizdech	Sportovní Hala, Nehvizdy	Czech Republic
2 February 2023	Czech Indoor Gala	Atletická hala, Ostrava	Czech Republic
4 February 2023	Hustopečské skákání	Městská sportovní hala, Hustopeče	Czech Republic
4 February 2023	Meeting de l'Eure	Stade couvert Jesse Owens, Val-de-Reuil	France
7 February 2023	Beskyd bar	Werk Arena, Třinec	Czech Republic
8 February 2023	Mondeville Meeting	Halle Michel d'Ornano, Mondeville	France
10 February 2023	ISTAF INDOOR	Mercedes-Benz Arena, Berlin	Germany
11 February 2023	Meeting de Paris	AccorHotels Arena de Bercy, Paris	France
11 February 2023	Meeting Metz Moselle Athlelor	L'Anneau-Halle d'athlétisme de Metz, Metz	France
14 February 2023	Banskobystrická latka	Športová hala Dukla, Banská Bystrica	Slovakia
15 February 2023	Belgrade Indoor Meeting	Štark Arena, Belgrade	Serbia
25 February 2023	All Star Perche	Maison des Sports, Clermont-Ferrand	France
11 March 2023	Perche Elite Tour	Complexe Kindarena, Rouen	France
BRONZE Meetings (17)
21 January 2023	Jablonec Indoor	Atletická hala - stadion Střelnice, Jablonec nad Nisou	Czech Republic
22 January 2023	CMCM Indoor Meeting	Coque Sport Center, Kirchberg	Luxembourg
25 January 2023	Aarhus SPRINT'n'JUMP	Aarhus Atletik og Løbeakademi, Århus	Denmark
25 January 2023	International Jump Meeting Cottbus	Lausitz-Arena, Cottbus	Germany
28 January 2023	Dr. Sander Invitational	Armory Track, New York City	United States
28 January 2023	Kladno INDOOR	Atletická hala Sletiště, Kladno	Czech Republic
28 January 2023	Manchester World Indoor Tour BRONZE	Sportcity Indoor Track, Manchester	United Kingdom
28 January 2023	Meeting indoor Nantes Métropole	Stadium Pierre-Quinon, Nantes	France
28 January 2023	Meeting National Indoor Lyon	Halle Stéphane Diagana, Lyon	France
29 January 2023	Folksam GP Stockholm Indoor	Sätrahallen, Stockholm	Sweden
3 February 2023	BKK Freundenberg High Jump Meeting	TSG-Halle, Weinheim	Germany
3 February 2023	Elite Indoor Track Miramas meeting	Stadium Miramas Métropole, Miramas	France
4 February 2023	IFAM Gent Indoor	Topsporthal Vlaanderen, Ghent	Belgium
4 February 2023	ORLEN Cup Łódź	Atlas Arena, Łódź	Poland
9 February 2023	Tampere Indoor Meeting	TESC, Tampere	Finland
12 February 2023	Sparkassen Indoor Meeting Dortmund	Helmut-Körnig-Halle, Dortmund	Germany
22 February 2023	Memorial Josip Gasparac Pole Vault	Osijek	Croatia
CHALLENGER Meetings (13)
25 January 2023	Meeting Internacional Ciudad de Valencia	Velódromo Luis Puig, Valencia	Spain
28 January 2023	Meeting Internacional Catalunya Pista Coberta	Pista Coberta de Catalunya, Sabadell	Spain
28 January 2023	Nordhausen Indoor Shot Put	Nordhausen	Germany
28 January 2023	PERCHE EN OR	Roubaix	France
29 January 2023	Elán Míting	Športová hala Elán, Bratislava	Slovakia
2 February 2023	Gothenburg Games	Friidrottens Hus, Göteborg	Sweden
2 February 2023	Karsten Warholm Invitation AL	Ulsteinhallen, Ulsteinvik	Norway
2 February 2023	Mondo Classic	IFU Arena, Uppsala	Sweden
3 February 2023	10. Breuninger Hallenmeeting	Hartwig-Gauder-Halle, Erfurt	Germany
3 February 2023	Filathlitikos Kallithea International High Jump Indoor Meeting	Athens	Greece
5 February 2023	17th Rochlitz Shot Put Meeting	Turnhalle Am Regenbogen, Rochlitz	Germany
5 February 2023	RIG Games	Laugardalshöll, Reykjavík	Iceland
12 February 2023	Nordic Indoor Match	Våxnäshallen, Karlstad	Sweden

== Results : Gold Tour ==
non World Indoor Tour events

=== Men's track ===
#	Meeting	60 m	400 m	800 m	1500 m	3000 m	60 m h
1	Karlsruhe	-	Benjamin Lobo Vedel (DEN); 46.45	-	George Mills (GBR); 3:35.88	Abdisa Fayisa (ETH); 7:40.35	Enrique Llopis (ESP); 7.57
2	Boston	Noah Lyles (USA); 6.51	Noah Williams (USA); 45.88	Mariano García (ESP); 1:45.26	Neil Gourley (GBR); 3:52.84 (Mile)	William Kincaid (USA); 7:40.71	Grant Holloway (USA); 7.38
3	Toruń	-	Carl Bengtström (SWE); 46.15 SB	Andreas Kramer (SWE); 1:46.37	Azeddine Habz (FRA); 3:35.59 PB	-	Daniel Roberts (USA); 7.46 =SB
4	New York	Christian Coleman (USA); 6.47	Jereem Richards (TRI); 45.84 SB	Noah Kibet (KEN); 1:44.98 WL PB	Yared Nuguse (USA); 3:47.38 (Mile) WL MR AR	Josh Kerr (GBR); 7:33.47 MR	-
5	Liévin	Ferdinand Omanyala (KEN); 6.54 PB	Karsten Warholm (NOR); 45.51 MR	Tony van Diepen (BEL); 1:46.36 PB	Jakob Ingebrigtsen (NOR); 3:32.38 WL	Lamecha Girma (ETH); 7:23.81 WR	Grant Holloway (USA); 7.39
6	Madrid	-	Óscar Husillos (ESP); 45.84	Saúl Ordóñez (ESP); 1:46.22	Yared Nuguse (USA); 3:33.69 MR	Amos Bett (KEN); 7:42.53 SB	Daniel Roberts (USA); 7.39 PB
7	Birmingham	Charles Dobson (GBR); 6.64	Jereem Richards (TRI); 45.74	-	Neil Gourley (GBR); 3:32.48 NR	-	Grant Holloway (USA); 7.35 MR
Overall		-	Jereem Richards (TRI); 27 pts	-	Neil Gourley (GBR); 27 pts	-	Grant Holloway (USA); 30 pts

=== Men's field ===
#	Meeting	High jump	Long jump	Triple jump	Pole vault	Shot put
1	Karlsruhe	-	-	-	KC Lightfoot (USA); 5.83	-
2	Boston	Tejaswin Shankar (IND); 2.26	-	-	-	-
3	Toruń	Hamish Kerr (NZL); 2.27	Thobias Montler (SWE); 8.17	-	Ernest Obiena (PHI); 5.87	-
4	New York	-	-	-	-	Ryan Crouser (USA); 22.58 WL MR
5	Liévin	-	Miltiadis Tentoglou (GRE); 8.41 WL	-	Armand Duplantis (SWE); 6.01	-
6	Madrid	-	Miltiadis Tentoglou (GRE); 8.15	-	-	-
7	Birmingham	Hamish Kerr (NZL); 2.28	Marquis Dendy (USA); 8.28	-	-	-
Overall		Hamish Kerr (NZL); 20 pts	Thobias Montler (SWE); 22 pts	-	-	-

=== Women's track ===
#	Meeting	60 m	400 m	800 m	1500 m	3000 m	60 m h
1	Karlsruhe	Dina Asher-Smith (GBR); 7.04 =MR NR	-	Anita Horvat (SLO); 2:00.44	-	Lemlem Hailu (ETH); 8:37.55	-
2	Boston	Aleia Hobbs (USA); 7.02	Gabrielle Thomas (USA); 36.31 (300m); Femke Bol (NED); 1:05.63 (500m) MR WB	Ajeé Wilson (USA); 2:00.45	Heather MacLean (USA); 4:23.42 (Mile)	Laura Muir (GBR); 8:40.34	Devynne Charlton (BAH); 7.87
3	Toruń	Mujinga Kambundji (SUI); 7.06	Lieke Klaver (NED); 51.14	Keely Hodgkinson (GBR); 1:57.87 WL MR	Gudaf Tsegay (ETH); 4:16.16 (Mile) WL MR	Freweyni Hailu (ETH); 8:46.92	Pia Skrzyszowska (POL); 7.79 MR
4	New York	Aleia Hobbs (USA); 7.04	Abby Steiner (USA); 35.54 (300m) WL NR	Ajeé Wilson (USA); 1:24.85 (600m)	Laura Muir (GBR); 4:20.15 (Mile)	Alicia Monson (USA); 8:25.05 WL MR AR	Devynne Charlton (BAH); 7.91
5	Liévin	-	Femke Bol (NED); 50.20 MR	Keely Hodgkinson (GBR); 1:57.71 WL	Gudaf Tsegay (ETH); 3:57.47 WL	Diribe Welteji (ETH); 8:34.84	-
6	Madrid	Aminatou Seyni (NIG); 7.08 MR NR	-	Noélie Yarigo (BEN); 2:01.47	-	-	Reetta Hurske (FIN); 7.79 MR NR
7	Birmingham	Dina Asher-Smith (GBR); 7.05 (NR h)	-	Keely Hodgkinson (GBR); 1:57.18 WL MR NR	Laura Muir (GBR); 2:34.53 (1000m)	Gudaf Tsegay (ETH); 8:16.69 MR	-
Overall		Aleia Hobbs (USA); 20 pts	-	Keely Hodgkinson (GBR); 30 pts	-	Lemlem Hailu (ETH); 22 pts	-

=== Women's field ===
#	Meeting	High jump	Long jump	Triple jump	Pole vault	Shot put
1	Karlsruhe	-	Ivana Vuleta (SRB); 6.76	Liadagmis Povea (CUB); 14.64	-	Auriol Dongmo (POR); 18.90
2	Boston	-	-	-	Bridget Williams (USA); 4.77	-
3	Toruń	-	-	-	-	-
4	New York	-	-	-	Katie Moon (USA); 4.81 SB	Chase Ealey (USA); 20.03 WL MR
5	Liévin	-	-	Liadagmis Povea (CUB); 14.81 WL	Katie Moon (USA); 4.83 WL	-
6	Madrid	-	-	Liadagmis Povea (CUB); 14.65	Alysha Newman (CAN); 4.65	Sarah Mitton (CAN); 19.76 MR
7	Birmingham	-	-	-	Alysha Newman (CAN); 4.78	-
Overall		-	-	Liadagmis Povea (CUB); 30 pts	Alysha Newman (CAN); 25 pts	Sarah Mitton (CAN); 17 pts
