= 2023 Villa de Madrid Indoor Meeting =

Indoor athletics meeting in Madrid, Spain

- Dates: 22 February 2023
- Host city: Madrid, Spain
- Venue: Centro Deportivo Municipal Gallur
- Level: 2023 World Athletics Indoor Tour

The 2023 Villa de Madrid Indoor Meeting was the 8th edition of the annual indoor athletics meeting in Madrid, Spain. Held on 22 February, it was the sixth and penultimate leg of the 2023 World Athletics Indoor Tour Gold series – the highest-level international indoor track and field athletics circuit.

Meeting records were set in the men's 1500 m as well as the women's 60 m, 60 m hurdles, and shot put. Reetta Hurske's mark in the 60 m hurdles was also a Finnish national record.

== Results ==
=== World Athletics Indoor Tour ===
Men's 400m
Place	Athlete	Country	Time	Heat	Points
1st place, gold medalist(s)	Óscar Husillos	Spain	45.84	1	10
2nd place, silver medalist(s)	Iñaki Cañal	Spain	45.95	1	7
3rd place, bronze medalist(s)	Benjamin Lobo Vedel	Denmark	45.98	1	5
4	Manuel Guijarro	Spain	46.47	2	3
5	Lucas Búa	Spain	46.72	2	
6	João Coelho	Portugal	46.84	1	
7	Edoardo Scotti	Italy	47.12	2	
8	Samuel García	Spain	47.75	2	
9	Ericsson Tavares	Portugal	47.92	2	
10	Christopher O'Donnell	Ireland	48.50	2	
	Dylan Borlée	Belgium	DNF	1	

Men's 1500m
Place	Athlete	Country	Time	Points
1st place, gold medalist(s)	Yared Nuguse	United States	3:33.69	10
2nd place, silver medalist(s)	Mohamed Katir	Spain	3:34.32	7
3rd place, bronze medalist(s)	Adel Mechaal	Spain	3:34.82	5
4	Grant Fisher	United States	3:34.99	3
5	Mario García	Spain	3:36.72	
6	Jesús Gómez	Spain	3:37.05	
7	Charles Grethen	Luxembourg	3:37.09	
8	Simon Denissel	France	3:40.09	
9	Pietro Arese	Italy	3:40.48	
10	Álvaro de Arriba	Spain	3:41.03	
11	Mohamed Attaoui	Spain	3:43.92	
	Erik Sowinski	United States	DNF	

Men's Long Jump
Place	Athlete	Country	Mark	Points
1st place, gold medalist(s)	Miltiadis Tentoglou	Greece	8.15 m	10
2nd place, silver medalist(s)	Maykel Massó	Cuba	8.15 m	7
3rd place, bronze medalist(s)	Thobias Montler	Sweden	8.14 m	5
4	Jaime Guerra	Spain	8.08 m	3
5	Lester Lescay	Cuba	8.00 m	
6	Iker Arotzena	Spain	7.71 m	
7	Maximilian Entholzner	Germany	7.62 m	

Women's 60m
Place	Athlete	Country	Time	Points
1st place, gold medalist(s)	Aminatou Seyni	Niger	7.08	10
2nd place, silver medalist(s)	N'Ketia Seedo	Netherlands	7.22	7
3rd place, bronze medalist(s)	Arialis Gandulla	Portugal	7.22	5
4	Jaël Bestué	Spain	7.24	3
5	Olivia Fotopoulou	Cyprus	7.26	
6	Kayla White	United States	7.26	
7	Mallory Leconte	France	7.29	
8	Gorete Semedo	São Tomé and Príncipe	7.34	

Women's 60m Round 1
Place	Athlete	Country	Time	Heat
1	Aminatou Seyni	Niger	7.11	2
2	Jaël Bestué	Spain	7.23	1
3	Arialis Gandulla	Portugal	7.24	2
4	Kayla White	United States	7.25	1
5	Olivia Fotopoulou	Cyprus	7.29	2
6	N'Ketia Seedo	Netherlands	7.31	1
7	Mallory Leconte	France	7.32	2
8	Gorete Semedo	São Tomé and Príncipe	7.39	1
9	Paula García García	Spain	7.41	2
10	Monika Weigertová	Slovakia	7.44	1
11	Sonia Molina-Prados	Spain	7.51	2
12	Alba Borrero	Spain	7.54	2
13	Paula Sevilla	Spain	7.63	1
14	Adriana Lopez	Spain	7.65	1

Women's 800m
Place	Athlete	Country	Time	Points
1st place, gold medalist(s)	Noélie Yarigo	Benin	2:01.47	10
2nd place, silver medalist(s)	Catriona Bisset	Australia	2:01.74	7
3rd place, bronze medalist(s)	Winnie Nanyondo	Uganda	2:02.02	5
4	Adelle Tracey	Jamaica	2:02.16	3
5	Anita Horvat	Slovenia	2:02.21	
6	Lore Hoffmann	Switzerland	2:02.43	
7	Lorea Ibarzabal	Spain	2:02.46	
8	Mary Moraa	Kenya	2:02.85	
9	Jenny Selman	Great Britain	2:03.02	
	Eva Santidrián	Spain	DNF	

Women's Pole Vault
Place	Athlete	Country	Mark	Points
1st place, gold medalist(s)	Alysha Newman	Canada	4.65 m	10
2nd place, silver medalist(s)	Xu Huiqin	China	4.55 m	7
3rd place, bronze medalist(s)	Elisa Molinarolo	Italy	4.45 m	5
4	Maialen Axpe	Spain	4.30 m	3
5	Nikoleta Kyriakopoulou	Greece	4.30 m	
6	Andrea San José	Spain	4.30 m	

Women's Triple Jump
Place	Athlete	Country	Mark	Points
1st place, gold medalist(s)	Liadagmis Povea	Cuba	14.65 m	10
2nd place, silver medalist(s)	Leyanis Pérez	Cuba	14.50 m	7
3rd place, bronze medalist(s)	Patrícia Mamona	Portugal	13.98 m	5
4	Ottavia Cestonaro	Italy	13.87 m	3
5	Ilionis Guillaume	France	13.63 m	
6	Diana Zagainova	Lithuania	12.86 m	

Women's Shot Put
Place	Athlete	Country	Mark	Points
1st place, gold medalist(s)	Sarah Mitton	Canada	19.76 m	10
2nd place, silver medalist(s)	Chase Ealey	United States	19.64 m	7
3rd place, bronze medalist(s)	Jessica Schilder	Netherlands	19.25 m	5
4	Fanny Roos	Sweden	19.17 m	3
5	Auriol Dongmo	Portugal	19.09 m	
6	Danniel Thomas-Dodd	Jamaica	18.84 m	
7	María Belén Toimil	Spain	17.77 m	
8	Julia Ritter	Germany	17.19 m	

=== Indoor Meeting ===
Men's 800m
Place	Athlete	Country	Time	Heat
1st place, gold medalist(s)	Saúl Ordóñez	Spain	1:46.22	1
2nd place, silver medalist(s)	Andreas Kramer	Sweden	1:46.52	1
3rd place, bronze medalist(s)	Mark English	Ireland	1:46.57	2
4	Javier Mirón	Spain	1:46.73	1
5	Pablo Sánchez-Valladares	Spain	1:46.83	2
6	Amel Tuka	Bosnia and Herzegovina	1:46.89	1
7	Kyle Langford	Great Britain	1:46.93	2
8	Adrián Ben	Spain	1:46.94	1
9	Elvin Josué Canales	Honduras	1:47.04	2
10	Tony van Diepen	Netherlands	1:47.43	1
11	Éric Nzikwinkunda	Burundi	1:48.09	2
12	Mariano García	Spain	1:48.56	1
	Guillermo Rojo	Spain	DNF	1
	Alejandro Matienzo	Spain	DNF	2

Men's 3000m
Place	Athlete	Country	Time
1st place, gold medalist(s)	Amos Bett	Kenya	7:42.53
2nd place, silver medalist(s)	Birhanu Balew	Bahrain	7:43.20
3rd place, bronze medalist(s)	Tim Verbaandert	Netherlands	7:48.35
4	Fernando Carro	Spain	7:48.96
5	Andreas Almgren	Sweden	7:49.40
6	Djilali Bedrani	France	8:03.56
7	Sebastián Martos	Spain	8:05.06
8	Víctor Ortiz-Rivera	Puerto Rico	8:14.88
	Miguel de la Torre	Spain	DNF
	Gonzalo Parra	Spain	DNF

Men's 60mH
Place	Athlete	Country	Time
1st place, gold medalist(s)	Daniel Roberts	United States	7.39
2nd place, silver medalist(s)	Roger Iribarne	Cuba	7.48
3rd place, bronze medalist(s)	Freddie Crittenden	United States	7.51
4	Enrique Llopis	Spain	7.51
5	Michael Dickson	United States	7.52
6	Paolo Dal Molin	Italy	7.70
7	Abdel Kader Larrinaga	Portugal	7.75
8	Daniel Cisneros	Spain	7.77

Men's 60mH Round 1
Place	Athlete	Country	Time	Heat
1	Daniel Roberts	United States	7.49	1
2	Roger Iribarne	Cuba	7.51	2
3	Enrique Llopis	Spain	7.56	2
4	Freddie Crittenden	United States	7.57	1
5	Michael Dickson	United States	7.59	1
6	Paolo Dal Molin	Italy	7.62	2
7	Daniel Cisneros	Spain	7.64	1
8	Abdel Kader Larrinaga	Portugal	7.73	1
9	Elmo Lakka	Finland	7.73	2
10	Kevin Sánchez	Spain	7.74	1
11	Daniel Castilla	Spain	7.74	1
12	Shuhei Ishikawa	Japan	7.81	2
13	Carlos Oses	Spain	7.86	2
14	David Ryba	Czech Republic	8.05	2
15	Pedro García	Spain	8.12	1
	Yaqoub Al-Youha	Kuwait	DQ	2

Women's 60mH
Place	Athlete	Country	Time
1st place, gold medalist(s)	Reetta Hurske	Finland	7.79
2nd place, silver medalist(s)	Cyréna Samba-Mayela	France	7.84
3rd place, bronze medalist(s)	Nadine Visser	Netherlands	7.86
4	Mette Graversgaard	Denmark	8.00
5	Sarah Lavin	Ireland	8.02
6	Xenia Benach	Spain	8.05
7	Zoë Sedney	Netherlands	8.11
8	Anne Zagré	Belgium	8.41

Women's 60mH Round 1
Place	Athlete	Country	Time	Heat
1	Reetta Hurske	Finland	7.82	2
2	Nadine Visser	Netherlands	7.87	1
3	Sarah Lavin	Ireland	7.95	2
4	Cyréna Samba-Mayela	France	7.95	2
5	Mette Graversgaard	Denmark	8.01	1
6	Xenia Benach	Spain	8.01	2
7	Zoë Sedney	Netherlands	8.09	1
8	Anne Zagré	Belgium	8.11	2
9	Cindy Sember	Great Britain	8.12	1
10	Lotta Harala	Finland	8.14	1
11	Keily Linet Pérez Ibañez	Cuba	8.32	2
12	Tereza Vokálová	Czech Republic	8.32	2
13	Marina Covarrubias	Spain	8.38	2
14	Carmen Sánchez	Spain	8.40	1
15	María Ignacia Eguiguren	Chile	8.50	1
	Paula Blanquer	Spain	DQ	1
