= 2023 Copernicus Cup =

Indoor athletics meeting in Toruń, Poland

- Dates: 8 February 2023
- Host city: Toruń, Poland
- Venue: Arena Toruń
- Level: 2023 World Athletics Indoor Tour

The 2023 Copernicus Cup was the 9th edition of the annual indoor track and field meeting in Toruń, Poland. Held on 8 February, it was the third leg of the 2023 World Athletics Indoor Tour Gold series – the highest-level international indoor track and field circuit.

The meeting featured a world record attempt in the indoor mile run by Gudaf Tsegay. Although she failed to break the record, her time of 4:16.16 was still the second-fastest time ever indoors. Meeting records were also set in the women's 800 m, women's 60 m hurdles, and men's long jump.

== Results ==
=== World Athletics Indoor Tour ===
Men's 400m
Place	Athlete	Country	Time	Points
1st place, gold medalist(s)	Carl Bengtström	Sweden	46.15	10
2nd place, silver medalist(s)	Benjamin Lobo Vedel	Denmark	46.50	7
3rd place, bronze medalist(s)	Alex Haydock-Wilson	Great Britain	46.70	5
4	Kajetan Duszyński	Poland	46.70	3
5	Liemarvin Bonevacia	Netherlands	46.72	
6	Óscar Husillos	Spain	46.98	

Men's 1500m
Place	Athlete	Country	Time	Points
1st place, gold medalist(s)	Azeddine Habz	France	3:35.59	10
2nd place, silver medalist(s)	George Mills	Great Britain	3:35.92	7
3rd place, bronze medalist(s)	Jesús Gómez	Spain	3:36.33	5
4	Michał Rozmys	Poland	3:36.54	3
5	Samuel Abate	Ethiopia	3:38.57	
6	Filip Sasínek	Czech Republic	3:38.74	
7	Tom Elmer	Switzerland	3:39.17	
8	Filip Ostrowski	Poland	3:40.52	
9	Filip Rak	Poland	3:40.90	
10	Michał Groberski	Poland	3:42.60	
11	Ruben Verheyden	Belgium	3:43.15	
12	Maciej Wyderka	Poland	3:44.35	
13	Andrzej Kowalczyk	Poland	3:47.15	
	Mike Foppen	Netherlands	DNF	
	Adam Czerwiński	Poland	DNF	

Men's 60mH
Place	Athlete	Country	Time	Points
1st place, gold medalist(s)	Daniel Roberts	United States	7.46	10
2nd place, silver medalist(s)	Roger Iribarne	Cuba	7.49	7
3rd place, bronze medalist(s)	Jakub Szymański	Poland	7.58	5
4	Milan Trajkovic	Cyprus	7.63	3
5	Petr Svoboda	Czech Republic	7.67	
6	Krzysztof Kiljan	Poland	7.77	
7	Enrique Llopis	Spain	7.80	
8	Dimitri Bascou	France	7.80	

Men's 60mH Round 1
Place	Athlete	Country	Time	Heat
1	Daniel Roberts	United States	7.54	1
2	Roger Iribarne	Cuba	7.54	1
3	Jakub Szymański	Poland	7.59	1
4	Petr Svoboda	Czech Republic	7.61	2
5	Dimitri Bascou	France	7.68	2
6	Milan Trajkovic	Cyprus	7.69	1
7	Enrique Llopis	Spain	7.69	2
8	Krzysztof Kiljan	Poland	7.72	2
9	Damian Czykier	Poland	7.76	2
10	David King	Great Britain	7.81	1

Men's High Jump
Place	Athlete	Country	Mark	Points
1st place, gold medalist(s)	Hamish Kerr	New Zealand	2.27 m	10
2nd place, silver medalist(s)	Tobias Potye	Germany	2.27 m	7
3rd place, bronze medalist(s)	Norbert Kobielski	Poland	2.24 m	5
4	Mateusz Przybylko	Germany	2.21 m	3
5	Mateusz Kołodziejski	Poland	2.21 m	
6	Brandon Starc	Australia	2.15 m	
7	Cezar Sidya	Poland	2.05 m	

Men's Long Jump
Place	Athlete	Country	Mark	Points
1st place, gold medalist(s)	Thobias Montler	Sweden	8.17 m	10
2nd place, silver medalist(s)	Maykel Massó	Cuba	7.84 m	7
3rd place, bronze medalist(s)	Marquis Dendy	United States	7.84 m	5
4	Gabriel Dzielakowski	Poland	7.39 m	3
5	Adrian Brzeziński	Poland	7.34 m	
6	Eusebio Cáceres	Spain	7.23 m	
	Miltiadis Tentoglou	Greece	DQ m	

Women's 60m
Place	Athlete	Country	Time	Points
1st place, gold medalist(s)	Mujinga Kambundji	Switzerland	7.06	10
2nd place, silver medalist(s)	Ewa Swoboda	Poland	7.11	7
3rd place, bronze medalist(s)	Kayla White	United States	7.13	5
4	Daryll Neita	Great Britain	7.13	3
5	Géraldine Frey	Switzerland	7.22	
6	María Isabel Pérez	Spain	7.26	
7	Krystsina Tsimanouskaya	Belarus	7.31	
8	Martyna Kotwiła	Poland	7.34	

Women's 60m Round 1
Place	Athlete	Country	Time	Heat
1	Ewa Swoboda	Poland	7.17	1
2	Kayla White	United States	7.17	1
3	Daryll Neita	Great Britain	7.20	2
4	Mujinga Kambundji	Switzerland	7.21	2
5	Géraldine Frey	Switzerland	7.25	2
6	María Isabel Pérez	Spain	7.29	2
7	Martyna Kotwiła	Poland	7.31	2
8	Krystsina Tsimanouskaya	Belarus	7.32	1
9	Magdalena Stefanowicz	Poland	7.33	2
10	Diana Vaisman	Israel	7.40	1
11	Kamila Ciba	Poland	7.41	1
12	Marika Popowicz-Drapała	Poland	7.41	2
13	Paulina Paluch	Poland	7.43	1
14	Magdalena Niemczyk	Poland	7.44	2
15	Katarzyna Ferenz	Poland	7.66	1

Women's 800m
Place	Athlete	Country	Time	Points
1st place, gold medalist(s)	Keely Hodgkinson	Great Britain	1:57.87	10
2nd place, silver medalist(s)	Noélie Yarigo	Benin	1:58.48	7
3rd place, bronze medalist(s)	Anita Horvat	Slovenia	2:01.42	5
4	Mary Moraa	Kenya	2:01.51	3
5	Halimah Nakaayi	Uganda	2:01.64	
6	Margarita Koczanowa	Poland	2:02.36	
7	Angelika Sarna	Poland	2:02.74	
8	Aleksandra Wiśniewska	Poland	2:09.84	
	Aneta Lemiesz	Poland	DNF	

Women's 3000m
Place	Athlete	Country	Time	Points
1st place, gold medalist(s)	Freweyni Hailu	Ethiopia	8:46.92	10
2nd place, silver medalist(s)	Ejgayehu Taye	Ethiopia	8:47.81	7
3rd place, bronze medalist(s)	Lemlem Hailu	Ethiopia	8:49.10	5
4	Werkuha Getachew	Ethiopia	8:51.55	3
5	Maureen Koster	Netherlands	8:51.62	
6	Martyna Galant	Poland	8:53.43	
7	Winnie Nanyondo	Uganda	8:55.23	
8	Águeda Marqués	Spain	8:58.02	
9	Alicja Konieczek	Poland	9:00.68	
10	Beata Topka	Poland	9:03.51	
11	Haile Gebru TSIHAY	Ethiopia	9:32.53	

=== Indoor Meeting ===
Men's 800m
Place	Athlete	Country	Time
1st place, gold medalist(s)	Andreas Kramer	Sweden	1:46.37
2nd place, silver medalist(s)	Collins Kipruto	Kenya	1:46.82
3rd place, bronze medalist(s)	Adrián Ben	Spain	1:46.96
4	Mateusz Borkowski	Poland	1:47.27
5	Simone Barontini	Italy	1:47.42
6	Guy Learmonth	Great Britain	1:47.73
7	Kacper Lewalski	Poland	1:48.25
8	Patryk Sieradzki	Poland	1:49.83
9	Patryk Dobek	Poland	1:52.34
	Jamie Webb	Great Britain	DNF
	Robert Bryliński	Poland	DNF

Men's Pole Vault
Place	Athlete	Country	Mark
1st place, gold medalist(s)	EJ Obiena	Philippines	5.87 m
2nd place, silver medalist(s)	Rutger Koppelaar	Netherlands	5.82 m
3rd place, bronze medalist(s)	Ben Broeders	Belgium	5.82 m
4	Menno Vloon	Netherlands	5.82 m
5	Claudio Stecchi	Italy	5.72 m
6	Piotr Lisek	Poland	5.72 m
7	Pål Haugen Lillefosse	Norway	5.62 m
8	Thiago Braz	Brazil	5.52 m
9	Paweł Wojciechowski	Poland	5.52 m
10	Robert Sobera	Poland	5.32 m
11	Emmanouil Karalis	Greece	NM m

Women's 400m
Place	Athlete	Country	Time
1st place, gold medalist(s)	Lieke Klaver	Netherlands	51.14
2nd place, silver medalist(s)	Lada Vondrová	Czech Republic	51.91
3rd place, bronze medalist(s)	Viktoriya Tkachuk	Ukraine	52.52
4	Kinga Gacka	Poland	53.09

Women's Mile
Place	Athlete	Country	Time
1st place, gold medalist(s)	Gudaf Tsegay	Ethiopia	4:16.16
2nd place, silver medalist(s)	Weronika Lizakowska	Poland	4:29.06
3rd place, bronze medalist(s)	Adelle Tracey	Jamaica	4:30.17
4	Marissa Damink	Netherlands	4:31.85
5	Aleksandra Płocińska	Poland	4:32.23
6	Kristiina Mäki	Czech Republic	4:32.30
7	Eliza Megger	Poland	4:33.72
	Saron Berhe	Ethiopia	DNF

Women's 60mH
Place	Athlete	Country	Time
1st place, gold medalist(s)	Pia Skrzyszowska	Poland	7.79
2nd place, silver medalist(s)	Reetta Hurske	Finland	7.81
3rd place, bronze medalist(s)	Britany Anderson	Jamaica	7.83
4	Nadine Visser	Netherlands	7.85
5	Ditaji Kambundji	Switzerland	7.94
6	Sarah Lavin	Ireland	8.07
7	Weronika Nagięć	Poland	8.16
8	Andrea Rooth	Norway	8.43

Women's 60mH Round 1
Place	Athlete	Country	Time	Heat
1	Britany Anderson	Jamaica	7.86	2
2	Reetta Hurske	Finland	7.89	2
3	Pia Skrzyszowska	Poland	7.91	1
4	Nadine Visser	Netherlands	8.00	1
5	Ditaji Kambundji	Switzerland	8.01	2
6	Sarah Lavin	Ireland	8.12	1
7	Weronika Nagięć	Poland	8.13	1
8	Andrea Rooth	Norway	8.18	1
9	Zoë Sedney	Netherlands	8.21	2
10	Karolina Kołeczek	Poland	8.30	2
11	Klaudia Wojtunik	Poland	8.30	2
12	Marika Majewska	Poland	8.34	1
13	Adrianna Sułek	Poland	8.41	2
