= 2023 New Balance Indoor Grand Prix =

Athletics meeting in Boston, Massachusetts

- Dates: 4 February 2023
- Host city: Boston, Massachusetts, United States
- Venue: The TRACK at New Balance
- Level: 2023 World Athletics Indoor Tour

The 2023 New Balance Indoor Grand Prix was the 28th edition of the annual indoor track and field meeting in Boston, Massachusetts. Held on 4 February, it was the second leg of the 2023 World Athletics Indoor Tour Gold series – the highest-level international indoor track and field circuit.

At the meeting, Femke Bol set a new world best performance in the 500 metres with a time of 1:05.63. In addition, meeting records were set in the women's 60 metres and women's mile.

== Results ==
=== World Athletics Indoor Tour ===
Men's 400m
| Place | Athlete | Country | Time | Points |
|---|---|---|---|---|
| 1st place, gold medalist(s) | Noah Williams | United States | 45.88 | 10 |
| 2nd place, silver medalist(s) | Jereem Richards | Trinidad and Tobago | 45.88 | 7 |
| 3rd place, bronze medalist(s) | Vernon Norwood | United States | 45.92 | 5 |
| 4 | Alex Haydock-Wilson | Great Britain | 46.29 | 3 |
| 5 | Javon Francis | Jamaica | 47.61 | |

Men's Mile
| Place | Athlete | Country | Time | Points |
|---|---|---|---|---|
| 1st place, gold medalist(s) | Neil Gourley | Great Britain | 3:52.84 | 10 |
| 2nd place, silver medalist(s) | Sam Tanner | New Zealand | 3:52.85 | 7 |
| 3rd place, bronze medalist(s) | Sam Prakel | United States | 3:53.58 | 5 |
| 4 | Andrew Coscoran | Ireland | 3:53.64 | 3 |
| 5 | John Gregorek Jr. | United States | 3:53.99 | |
| 6 | Luke McCann | Ireland | 3:54.91 | |
| 7 | Jochem Vermeulen | Belgium | 3:59.32 | |
| 8 | Charlie Grice | Great Britain | 4:00.31 | |
| 9 | Cruz Culpepper | United States | 4:02.08 | |
| 10 | Hobbs Kessler | United States | 4:05.01 | |
| 11 | Josh Hoey | United States | 4:05.58 | |
| | Erik Sowinski | United States | DNF | |
| | Josh Thompson | United States | DNF | |
| | Isaac Nader | Portugal | DNF | |

Men's 60mH
| Place | Athlete | Country | Time | Points |
|---|---|---|---|---|
| 1st place, gold medalist(s) | Grant Holloway | United States | 7.38 | 10 |
| 2nd place, silver medalist(s) | Daniel Roberts | United States | 7.46 | 7 |
| 3rd place, bronze medalist(s) | Freddie Crittenden | United States | 7.55 | 5 |
| 4 | Robert Dunning | United States | 7.61 | 3 |
| 5 | Trey Cunningham | United States | 7.67 | |
| 6 | Jaylan McConico | United States | 7.78 | |
| 7 | Josh Braverman | United States | 7.85 | |
| | Louis Rollins | United States | DQ | |

Men's 60mH Round 1
| Place | Athlete | Country | Time | Heat |
|---|---|---|---|---|
| 1 | Grant Holloway | United States | 7.39 | 1 |
| 2 | Daniel Roberts | United States | 7.52 | 2 |
| 3 | Freddie Crittenden | United States | 7.59 | 1 |
| 4 | Robert Dunning | United States | 7.60 | 1 |
| 5 | Trey Cunningham | United States | 7.62 | 2 |
| 6 | Josh Braverman | United States | 7.74 | 1 |
| 7 | Louis Rollins | United States | 7.74 | 1 |
| 8 | Jaylan McConico | United States | 7.77 | 2 |
| 9 | Damion Thomas | Jamaica | 7.82 | 2 |
| 10 | Joshua Zeller | Great Britain | 8.00 | 2 |

Men's High Jump
| Place | Athlete | Country | Mark | Points |
|---|---|---|---|---|
| 1st place, gold medalist(s) | Tejaswin Shankar | India | 2.26 m | 10 |
| 2nd place, silver medalist(s) | Donald Thomas | Bahamas | 2.23 m | 7 |
| 3rd place, bronze medalist(s) | Darryl Sullivan | United States | 2.19 m | 5 |
| 4 | Darius Carbin | United States | NM m | 3 |

Women's 60m
| Place | Athlete | Country | Time | Points |
|---|---|---|---|---|
| 1st place, gold medalist(s) | Aleia Hobbs | United States | 7.02 | 10 |
| 2nd place, silver medalist(s) | Mikiah Brisco | United States | 7.10 | 7 |
| 3rd place, bronze medalist(s) | Celera Barnes | United States | 7.21 | 5 |
| 4 | Kayla White | United States | 7.22 | 3 |
| 5 | Candace Hill | United States | 7.23 | |
| 6 | Kiara Parker | United States | 7.24 | |
| 7 | Melissa Jefferson | United States | 7.26 | |
| 8 | Anthonique Strachan | Bahamas | 7.40 | |

Women's 60m Round 1
| Place | Athlete | Country | Time | Heat |
|---|---|---|---|---|
| 1 | Aleia Hobbs | United States | 7.08 | 1 |
| 2 | Mikiah Brisco | United States | 7.15 | 2 |
| 3 | Celera Barnes | United States | 7.21 | 1 |
| 4 | Kayla White | United States | 7.21 | 2 |
| 5 | Kiara Parker | United States | 7.22 | 1 |
| 6 | Candace Hill | United States | 7.25 | 1 |
| 7 | Melissa Jefferson | United States | 7.25 | 2 |
| 8 | Anthonique Strachan | Bahamas | 7.32 | 2 |
| 9 | Sydney McLaughlin-Levrone | United States | 7.33 | 1 |
| 10 | Shericka Jackson | Jamaica | 7.34 | 2 |
| 11 | Cambrea Sturgis | United States | 7.37 | 2 |
| 12 | Kendra Harrison | United States | 7.39 | 2 |
| 13 | Javianne Oliver | United States | 7.42 | 1 |

Women's 800m
| Place | Athlete | Country | Time | Points |
|---|---|---|---|---|
| 1st place, gold medalist(s) | Ajeé Wilson | United States | 2:00.45 | 10 |
| 2nd place, silver medalist(s) | Kaela Edwards | United States | 2:01.09 | 7 |
| 3rd place, bronze medalist(s) | Isabelle Boffey | Great Britain | 2:01.42 | 5 |
| 4 | Ellie Baker | Great Britain | 2:03.19 | 3 |
| 5 | Samantha Watson | United States | 2:03.65 | |
| 6 | Kristie Schoffield | United States | 2:05.24 | |
| 7 | Lynsey Sharp | Great Britain | 2:05.60 | |
| | Gemma Finch | Great Britain | DNF | |

Women's 3000m
| Place | Athlete | Country | Time | Points |
|---|---|---|---|---|
| 1st place, gold medalist(s) | Laura Muir | Great Britain | 8:40.34 | 10 |
| 2nd place, silver medalist(s) | Melissa Courtney-Bryant | Great Britain | 8:41.09 | 7 |
| 3rd place, bronze medalist(s) | Katie Snowden | Great Britain | 8:47.41 | 5 |
| 4 | Hannah Nuttall | Great Britain | 8:47.72 | 3 |
| 5 | Alicja Konieczek | Poland | 8:51.08 | |
| 6 | Julie-Anne Staehli | Canada | 8:51.96 | |
| 7 | Lea Meyer | Germany | 8:52.48 | |
| 8 | Marta Pérez | Spain | 8:52.63 | |
| 9 | Adelle Tracey | Jamaica | 8:52.96 | |
| 10 | Roisin Flanagan | Ireland | 8:53.50 | |
| 11 | Jennifer Nesbitt | Great Britain | 9:09.83 | |
| 12 | Izzy Fry | Great Britain | 9:12.82 | |
| 13 | Millie Paladino | United States | 9:17.62 | |
| 14 | Katrina Coogan | United States | 9:35.65 | |
| | Ciara Mageean | Ireland | DNF | |
| | Holly Archer | Great Britain | DNF | |

Women's Pole Vault
| Place | Athlete | Country | Mark | Points |
|---|---|---|---|---|
| 1st place, gold medalist(s) | Bridget Williams | United States | 4.77 m | 10 |
| 2nd place, silver medalist(s) | Gabriela Leon | United States | 4.55 m | 7 |
| 3rd place, bronze medalist(s) | Katerina Stefanidi | Greece | 4.55 m | 5 |
| 4 | Katie Moon | United States | 4.45 m | 3 |
| 5 | Emily Grove | United States | 4.45 m | |
| 6 | Kristen Brown | United States | 4.30 m | |

=== Indoor Meeting ===
Men's 60m
| Place | Athlete | Country | Time |
|---|---|---|---|
| 1st place, gold medalist(s) | Noah Lyles | United States | 6.51 |
| 2nd place, silver medalist(s) | Trayvon Bromell | United States | 6.51 |
| 3rd place, bronze medalist(s) | Benjamin Azamati | Ghana | 6.62 |
| 4 | Miles Lewis | Puerto Rico | 6.62 |
| 5 | Kendal Williams | United States | 6.64 |
| 6 | Demek Kemp | United States | 6.67 |
| 7 | Micheal Campbell | Jamaica | 6.79 |
| | Terrance Laird | United States | DNS |

Men's 60m Round 1
| Place | Athlete | Country | Time | Heat |
|---|---|---|---|---|
| 1 | Noah Lyles | United States | 6.56 | 1 |
| 2 | Trayvon Bromell | United States | 6.61 | 2 |
| 3 | Benjamin Azamati | Ghana | 6.65 | 2 |
| 4 | Kendal Williams | United States | 6.68 | 1 |
| 5 | Miles Lewis | Puerto Rico | 6.69 | 1 |
| 6 | Terrance Laird | United States | 6.69 | 2 |
| 7 | Demek Kemp | United States | 6.71 | 1 |
| 8 | Micheal Campbell | Jamaica | 6.73 | 2 |
| | Josephus Lyles | United States | DQ | 2 |

Men's 800m
| Place | Athlete | Country | Time |
|---|---|---|---|
| 1st place, gold medalist(s) | Mariano García | Spain | 1:45.26 |
| 2nd place, silver medalist(s) | Isaiah Jewett | United States | 1:45.75 |
| 3rd place, bronze medalist(s) | Mark English | Ireland | 1:46.57 |
| 4 | Bryce Hoppel | United States | 1:46.58 |
| 5 | Daniel Rowden | Great Britain | 1:46.75 |
| 6 | Kyle Langford | Great Britain | 1:47.73 |
| 7 | Drew Piazza | United States | 1:51.56 |
| 8 | Hiroki Minamoto | Japan | 1:52.94 |
| | Erik Sowinski | United States | DNF |

Men's 3000m
| Place | Athlete | Country | Time |
|---|---|---|---|
| 1st place, gold medalist(s) | Woody Kincaid | United States | 7:40.71 |
| 2nd place, silver medalist(s) | Christian Noble | United States | 7:42.55 |
| 3rd place, bronze medalist(s) | James West | Great Britain | 7:42.89 |
| 4 | Morgan Beadlescomb | United States | 7:42.90 |
| 5 | Ben Flanagan | Canada | 7:43.49 |
| 6 | Brian Fay | Ireland | 7:43.85 |
| 7 | Darragh McElhinney | Ireland | 7:45.79 |
| 8 | Thomas Keen | Great Britain | 7:48.99 |
| 9 | Mason Ferlic | United States | 7:49.62 |
| 10 | Maximilian Thorwirth | Germany | 7:50.92 |
| 11 | Daniel Arce | Spain | 7:54.39 |
| 12 | Osian Perrin | Great Britain | 7:55.74 |
| | Benjamin Allen | United States | DNF |
| | Eric Avila | United States | DNF |
| | Addisu Yihune | Ethiopia | DNF |

Women's 300m
| Place | Athlete | Country | Time |
|---|---|---|---|
| 1st place, gold medalist(s) | Gabrielle Thomas | United States | 36.31 |
| 2nd place, silver medalist(s) | Anna Kiełbasińska | Poland | 36.41 |
| 3rd place, bronze medalist(s) | Lynna Irby | United States | 36.62 |
| 4 | Jenna Prandini | United States | 38.16 |

Women's 500m
| Place | Athlete | Country | Time |
|---|---|---|---|
| 1st place, gold medalist(s) | Femke Bol | Netherlands | 1:05.63 |
| 2nd place, silver medalist(s) | Leah Anderson | Jamaica | 1:08.34 |
| 3rd place, bronze medalist(s) | Janieve Russell | Jamaica | 1:09.18 |
| 4 | Lisanne de Witte | Netherlands | 1:09.87 |

Women's Mile
| Place | Athlete | Country | Time |
|---|---|---|---|
| 1st place, gold medalist(s) | Heather MacLean | United States | 4:23.42 |
| 2nd place, silver medalist(s) | Lucia Stafford | Canada | 4:23.52 |
| 3rd place, bronze medalist(s) | Esther Guerrero | Spain | 4:24.92 |
| 4 | Emily Mackay | United States | 4:26.09 |
| 5 | Dani Jones | United States | 4:26.75 |
| 6 | Jemma Reekie | Great Britain | 4:28.49 |
| 7 | Emma Coburn | United States | 4:28.84 |
| 8 | Nozomi Tanaka | Japan | 4:28.94 |
| 9 | Helen Schlachtenhaufen | United States | 4:29.50 |
| 10 | Taryn Rawlings | United States | 4:31.33 |
| 11 | Vera Hoffmann | Luxembourg | 4:32.05 |
| 12 | Allie Wilson | United States | 4:33.93 |
| 13 | Georgie Hartigan | Ireland | 4:43.69 |
| | Cory McGee | United States | DNF |

Women's 60mH
| Place | Athlete | Country | Time |
|---|---|---|---|
| 1st place, gold medalist(s) | Devynne Charlton | Bahamas | 7.87 |
| 2nd place, silver medalist(s) | Sharika Nelvis | United States | 7.93 |
| 3rd place, bronze medalist(s) | Celeste Mucci | Australia | 7.95 |
| 4 | Danielle Williams | Jamaica | 7.97 |
| 5 | Taliyah Brooks | United States | 8.08 |
| 6 | Michelle Harrison | Canada | 8.10 |
| 7 | Cindy Sember | Great Britain | 8.19 |
| 8 | Lolo Jones | United States | 8.55 |
