= 2024 World Athletics Indoor Championships – Men's 3000 metres =

Men's 3000 metres at the 2024 World Athletics Indoor Championships
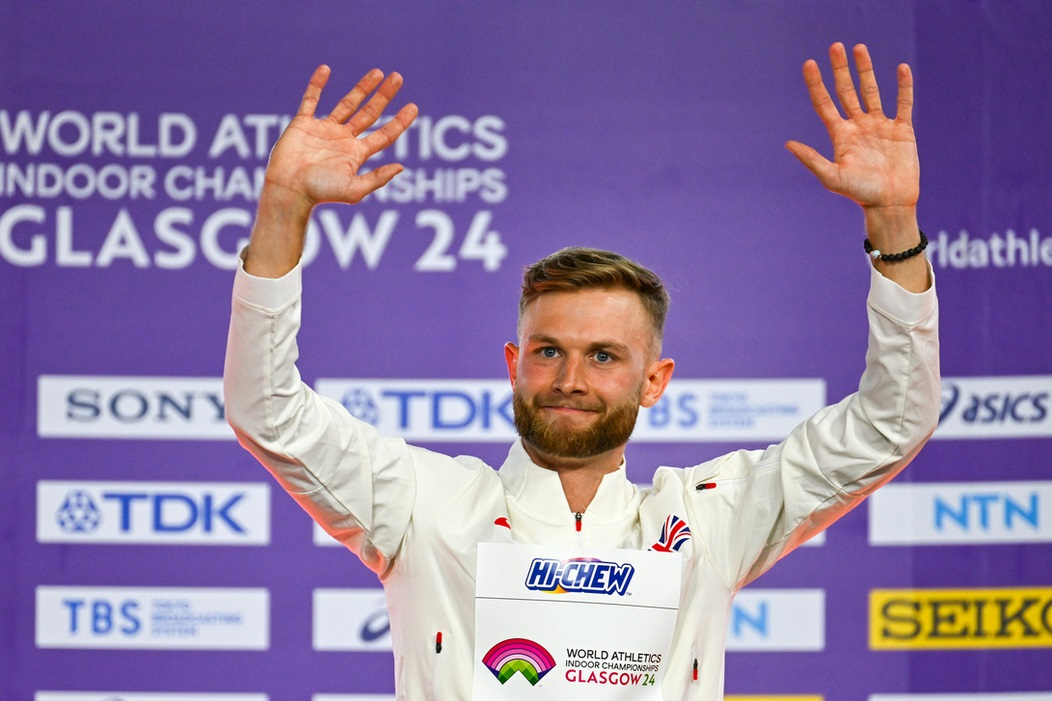
- Josh Kerr won the gold medal
- Venue: Commonwealth Arena
- Dates: 2 March
- Competitors: 12 from 9 nations
- Winning time: 7:42.98

Medalists
gold medal	Josh Kerr	Great Britain
silver medal	Yared Nuguse	United States
bronze medal	Selemon Barega	Ethiopia

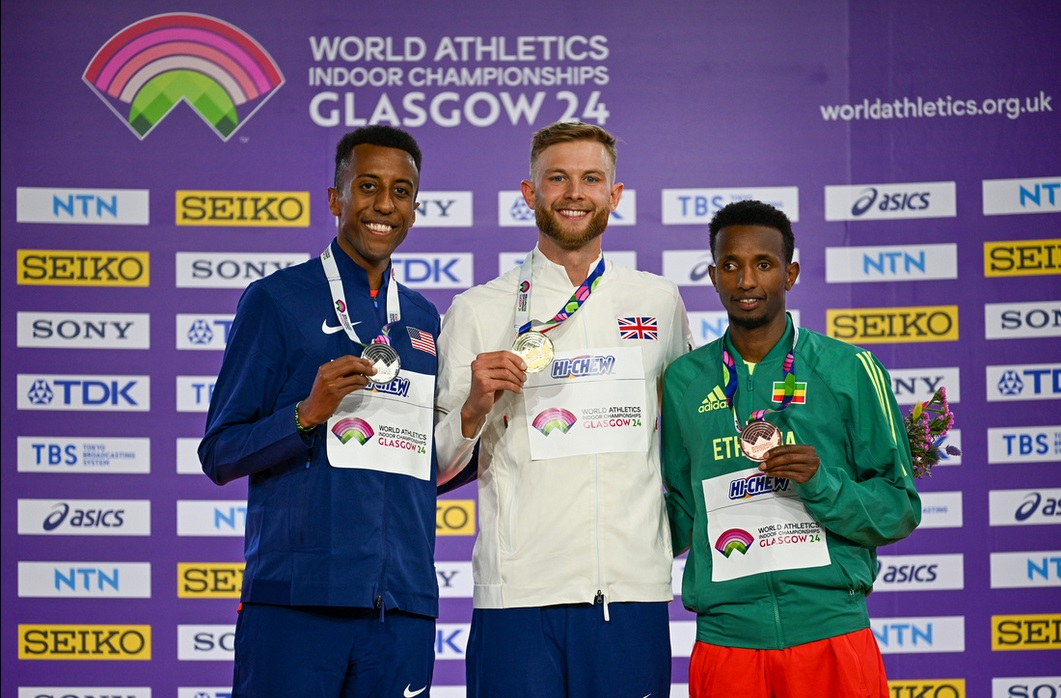
Yared Nuguse, Josh Kerr, and Selemon Barega on the podium

The men's 3000 metres at the 2024 World Athletics Indoor Championships took place on 2 March 2024.

== Results ==
=== Final ===
The final was started on 2 March at 20:40.

Rank	Name	Nationality	Time	Notes
1st place, gold medalist(s)	Josh Kerr	Great Britain	7:42.98	
2nd place, silver medalist(s)	Yared Nuguse	United States	7:43.59	
3rd place, bronze medalist(s)	Selemon Barega	Ethiopia	7:43.64	
4	Getnet Wale	Ethiopia	7:44.77	
5	Olin Hacker	United States	7:45.40	SB
6	Adel Mechaal	Spain	7:45.67	
7	Pietro Arese	Italy	7:46.46	
8	John Heymans	Belgium	7:48.18	
9	Mohamed Ismail Ibrahim	Djibouti	7:50.05	PB
10	Hicham Akankam	Morocco	7:55.04	
11	Federico Riva	Italy	8:02.66	
12	Mohammad Karim Yaqoot	Afghanistan	9:37.10	SB
