= 2023 Millrose Games =

Indoor athletics meeting in New York City

- Dates: 11 February 2023
- Host city: New York City, New York, United States
- Venue: Fort Washington Avenue Armory
- Level: 2023 World Athletics Indoor Tour

The 2023 Millrose Games was the 115th edition of the annual indoor track and field meeting in New York City. Held on 11 February, it was the fourth leg of the 2023 World Athletics Indoor Tour Gold series – the highest-level international indoor track and field circuit.

The meeting was highlighted by Yared Nuguse running the second-fastest indoor mile run of all time in the Wanamaker Mile. Abby Steiner also set an American record in the women's 300 metres, and Shawnti Jackson broke the high school record in the women's 60 metres.

== Results ==
=== World Athletics Indoor Tour ===
Men's 400m
Place	Athlete	Country	Time	Points
1st place, gold medalist(s)	Jereem Richards	Trinidad and Tobago	45.84	10
2nd place, silver medalist(s)	Noah Williams	United States	46.20	7
3rd place, bronze medalist(s)	Bryce Deadmon	United States	46.34	5
4	Je'Von Hutchison	United States	48.55	3

Men's Mile
Place	Athlete	Country	Time	Points
1st place, gold medalist(s)	Yared Nuguse	United States	3:47.38	10
2nd place, silver medalist(s)	Neil Gourley	Great Britain	3:49.46	7
3rd place, bronze medalist(s)	Ollie Hoare	Australia	3:50.83	5
4	Sam Tanner	New Zealand	3:51.70	3
5	Mario García	Spain	3:51.79	
6	John Gregorek Jr.	United States	3:51.82	
7	Josh Thompson	United States	3:52.49	
8	Luke McCann	Ireland	3:53.55	
9	Sam Prakel	United States	3:54.32	
10	Drew Hunter	United States	3:55.52	
11	Eric Holt	United States	3:58.64	
	Erik Sowinski	United States	DNF	
	Eliud Kipsang	Kenya	DNF	

Women's 60m
Place	Athlete	Country	Time	Points
1st place, gold medalist(s)	Aleia Hobbs	United States	7.04	10
2nd place, silver medalist(s)	Tamari Davis	United States	7.08	7
3rd place, bronze medalist(s)	Marybeth Sant-Price	United States	7.11	5
4	Mikiah Brisco	United States	7.13	3
5	Shawnti Jackson	United States	7.16	
6	Melissa Jefferson	United States	7.18	
7	Celera Barnes	United States	7.19	
8	English Gardner	United States	7.30	
9	Kendra Harrison	United States	7.38	

Women's 600m
Place	Athlete	Country	Time	Points
1st place, gold medalist(s)	Ajeé Wilson	United States	1:24.85	10
2nd place, silver medalist(s)	Shamier Little	United States	1:26.16	7
3rd place, bronze medalist(s)	Allie Wilson	United States	1:26.40	5
4	Brenna Detra	United States	1:27.38	3
5	Sophia Gorriaran	United States	1:27.51	

Women's 3000m
Place	Athlete	Country	Time	Points
1st place, gold medalist(s)	Alicia Monson	United States	8:25.05	10
2nd place, silver medalist(s)	Whittni Morgan	United States	8:30.13	7
3rd place, bronze medalist(s)	Katelyn Tuohy	United States	8:35.20	5
4	Elly Henes	United States	8:36.48	3
5	Elise Cranny	United States	8:37.17	
6	Laura Galván	Mexico	8:40.45	
7	Gabrielle Jennings	United States	8:51.10	
8	Eleanor Fulton	United States	8:54.44	
9	Mercy Chelangat	Kenya	8:54.50	
10	Hannah Steelman	United States	8:54.69	
11	Courtney Wayment	United States	8:55.35	
12	Mariana Machado	Portugal	9:03.12	
	Anna Camp Bennett	United States	DNF	
	Danielle Aragon	United States	DNF	

Women's Pole Vault
Place	Athlete	Country	Mark	Points
1st place, gold medalist(s)	Katie Moon	United States	4.81 m	10
2nd place, silver medalist(s)	Bridget Williams	United States	4.76 m	7
3rd place, bronze medalist(s)	Katerina Stefanidi	Greece	4.62 m	5
4	Gabriela Leon	United States	4.48 m	3
5	Amanda Moll	United States	4.48 m	
6	Hana Moll	United States	4.34 m	
7	Emily Grove	United States	4.20 m	

Women's Shot Put
Place	Athlete	Country	Mark	Points
1st place, gold medalist(s)	Chase Ealey	United States	20.03 m	10
2nd place, silver medalist(s)	Sarah Mitton	Canada	19.52 m	7
3rd place, bronze medalist(s)	Maggie Ewen	United States	19.49 m	5
4	Jessica Woodard	United States	17.77 m	3

=== Indoor Meeting ===
Men's 60m
Place	Athlete	Country	Time
1st place, gold medalist(s)	Christian Coleman	United States	6.47
2nd place, silver medalist(s)	Travis Williams	Jamaica	6.59
3rd place, bronze medalist(s)	Josephus Lyles	United States	6.59
4	Miles Lewis	Puerto Rico	6.62
5	Coby Hilton	United States	6.63
6	Kendal Williams	United States	6.66
7	Nyckoles Harbor	United States	6.70
	Noah Lyles	United States	DQ

Men's 800m
Place	Athlete	Country	Time
1st place, gold medalist(s)	Noah Kibet	Kenya	1:44.98
2nd place, silver medalist(s)	Isaiah Harris	United States	1:45.64
3rd place, bronze medalist(s)	Clayton Murphy	United States	1:46.83
4	Kyle Langford	Great Britain	1:46.98
5	Jesús Tonatiú López	Mexico	1:47.41
6	Mark English	Ireland	1:48.76
7	Bryce Hoppel	United States	1:54.43
8	Cade Flatt	United States	1:55.26
	CJ Jones	United States	DNF

Men's 3000m
Place	Athlete	Country	Time
1st place, gold medalist(s)	Josh Kerr	Great Britain	7:33.47
2nd place, silver medalist(s)	Luis Grijalva	Guatemala	7:33.86
3rd place, bronze medalist(s)	Joe Klecker	United States	7:34.14
4	Cooper Teare	United States	7:34.70
5	Jonas Raess	Switzerland	7:35.24
6	Geordie Beamish	New Zealand	7:36.22
7	Dylan Jacobs	United States	7:36.89
8	Sam Parsons	Germany	7:39.94
9	Alex Maier	United States	7:43.05
10	Olin Hacker	United States	7:43.94
11	Nico Young	United States	7:51.21
	AJ Ernst	United States	DNF
	Austin Miller	United States	DNF

Men's Shot Put
Place	Athlete	Country	Mark
1st place, gold medalist(s)	Ryan Crouser	United States	22.58 m
2nd place, silver medalist(s)	Joe Kovacs	United States	21.34 m
3rd place, bronze medalist(s)	Adrian Piperi	United States	20.65 m
4	Nick Ponzio	Italy	20.43 m

Women's 300m
Place	Athlete	Country	Time
1st place, gold medalist(s)	Abby Steiner	United States	35.54
2nd place, silver medalist(s)	Brittany Brown	United States	36.13
3rd place, bronze medalist(s)	Leah Anderson	Jamaica	36.68
4	Jenna Prandini	United States	38.05
5	Rori Lowe	United States	39.36

Women's Mile
Place	Athlete	Country	Time
1st place, gold medalist(s)	Laura Muir	Great Britain	4:20.15
2nd place, silver medalist(s)	Josette Andrews	United States	4:20.88
3rd place, bronze medalist(s)	Katie Snowden	Great Britain	4:21.19
4	Lucia Stafford	Canada	4:22.72
5	Helen Schlachtenhaufen	United States	4:23.94
6	Sintayehu Vissa	Italy	4:24.54
7	Nikki Hiltz	United States	4:24.68
8	Sage Hurta	United States	4:26.04
9	Jemma Reekie	Great Britain	4:28.91
	Charlene Lipsey	United States	DNF

Women's 60mH
Place	Athlete	Country	Time
1st place, gold medalist(s)	Devynne Charlton	Bahamas	7.91
2nd place, silver medalist(s)	Tonea Marshall	United States	7.94
3rd place, bronze medalist(s)	Sharika Nelvis	United States	7.96
4	Nia Ali	United States	7.97
5	Anna Cockrell	United States	8.00
6	Michelle Harrison	Canada	8.10
7	Anna Hall	United States	8.17
8	Camden Bentley	United States	8.35
