= Villa de Madrid Indoor Meeting =

Annual indoor track and field competition

Villa De Madrid Indoor Meeting
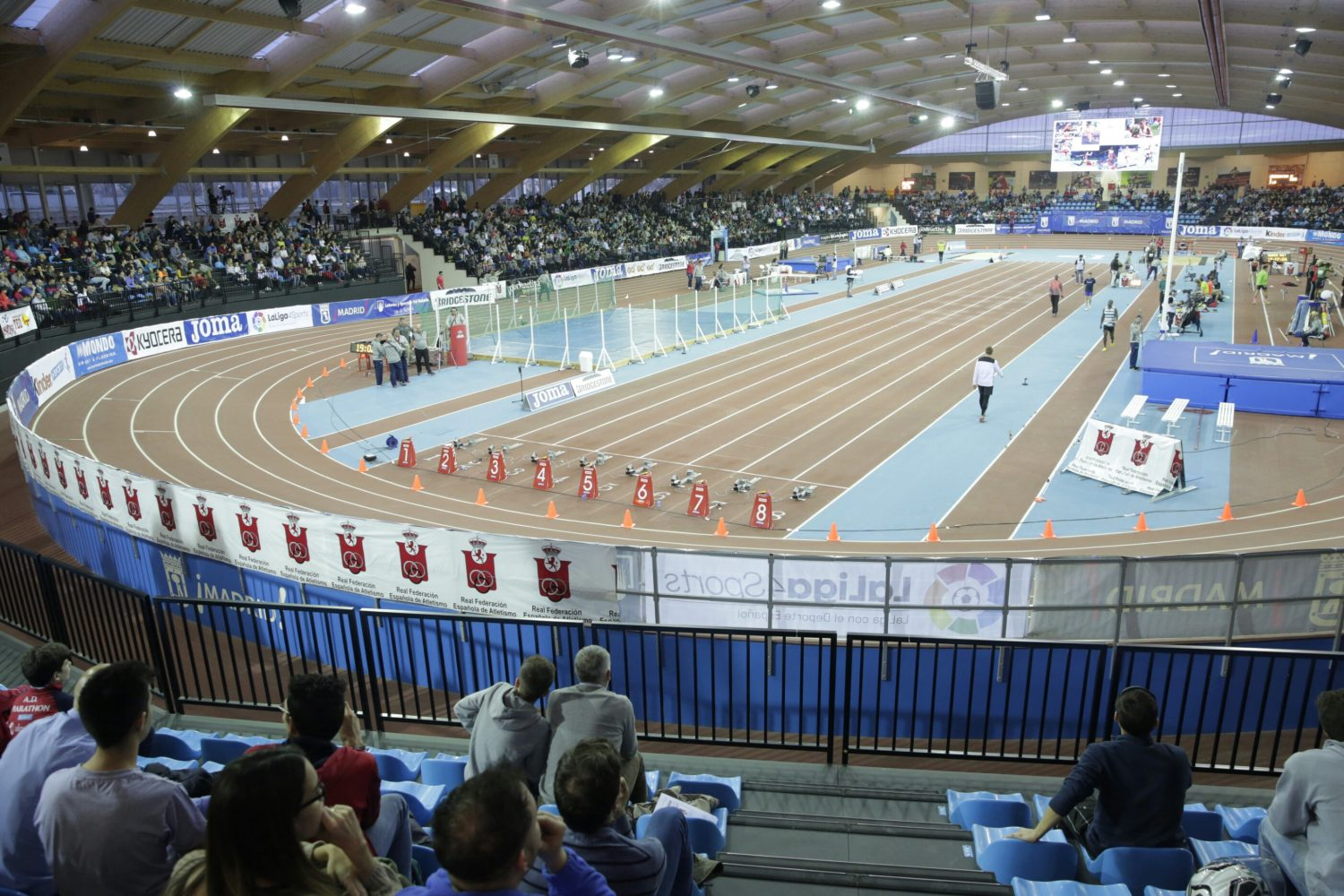
- The 2017 edition of the meeting at the Centro Deportivo Municipal Gallur
- Date: February
- Location: Madrid, Spain
- Event type: Indoor track and field
- Established: 2016
- Website: Villa De Madrid Indoor Meeting
- 2026 Villa de Madrid Indoor Meeting

Villa De Madrid Indoor Meeting is an annual indoor track and field competition which takes place in February in Madrid, Spain. The event was first held at the Gallur Municipality Sport Complex in 2016 and is a World Athletics Indoor Tour Gold tier meeting since 2021.

== Editions ==
Villa de Madrid Indoor Meeting editions
Ed.	Name	Date	Ref.
1st	2016 Reunión Internacional de Atletismo en Pista Cubierta	26 Feb 2016	
2nd	2017 Meeting Internacional de Atletismo Villa de Madrid	24 Feb 2017	
3rd	2018 Villa de Madrid Indoor Meeting	8 Feb 2018	
4th	2019 Villa de Madrid Indoor Meeting	8 Feb 2019	
5th	2020 Villa de Madrid Indoor Meeting	21 Feb 2020	
6th	2021 Villa de Madrid Indoor Meeting	24 Feb 2021	
7th	2022 Villa de Madrid Indoor Meeting	2 Mar 2022	
8th	2023 Villa de Madrid Indoor Meeting	22 Feb 2023	
9th	2024 Villa de Madrid Indoor Meeting	23 Feb 2024	
10th	2025 Villa de Madrid Indoor Meeting	28 Feb 2025	
11th	2026 Villa de Madrid Indoor Meeting	6 Feb 2026	

== Meeting records ==
=== Men ===
Men's meeting records of the Villa de Madrid Indoor Meeting
Event	Record	Athlete	Nationality	Date	Meet	Ref.
60 m	6.44	Ronnie Baker	United States	21 February 2020	2020	
400 m	45.19	Bralon Taplin	Grenada	24 February 2017	2017	
800 m	1:45.00	Catalin Tecuceanu	Italy	23 February 2024	2024	
1000 m	2:14.52	Mohamed Attaoui	Spain	6 February 2026	2026	
1500 m	3:33.69	Yared Nuguse	United States	22 February 2023	2023	
3000 m	7:34.03	Selemon Barega	Ethiopia	2 March 2022	2022	
60 m hurdles	7.29 WR	Grant Holloway	United States	24 February 2021	2021	
Pole vault	5.85 m	Konstantinos Filippidis	Greece	8 February 2018	2018	
Long jump	8.41 m	Juan Miguel Echevarría	Cuba	21 February 2020	2020	
Triple jump	17.52 m	Jordan Díaz	Spain	23 February 2024	2024	
Shot put	22.16 m	Rajindra Campbell	Jamaica	23 February 2024	2024	

=== Women ===
Women's meeting records of the Villa de Madrid Indoor Meeting
Event	Record	Athlete	Nationality	Date	Meet	Ref.
60 m	7.08	Aminatou Seyni	Niger	22 February 2023	2023	
400 m	51.11	Andrea Miklós	Romania	23 February 2024	2024	
800 m	1:58.94	Habitam Alemu	Ethiopia	24 February 2021	2021	
1000 m	2:33.06	Genzebe Dibaba	Ethiopia	24 February 2017	2017	
1500 m	3:57.38	Gudaf Tsegay	Ethiopia	2 March 2022	2022	
3000 m	8:22.65	Gudaf Tsegay	Ethiopia	24 February 2021	2021	
60 m hurdles	7.68	Devynne Charlton	Bahamas	23 February 2024	2024	
High jump	2.00 m	Mariya Lasitskene	Russia	8 February 2018	2018	
Pole vault	4.91 m	Anzhelika Sidorova	Russia	8 February 2019	2019	
Long jump	6.67 m	Lorraine Ugen	Great Britain	2 March 2022	2022	
Triple jump	15.43 m	Yulimar Rojas	Venezuela	21 February 2020	2020	
Shot put	19.76	Sarah Mitton	Canada	22 February 2023	2023	
