= 2024 Villa de Madrid Indoor Meeting =

Indoor athletics meeting in Madrid, Spain

- Dates: 23 February 2024
- Host city: Madrid, Spain
- Venue: Centro Deportivo Municipal Gallur
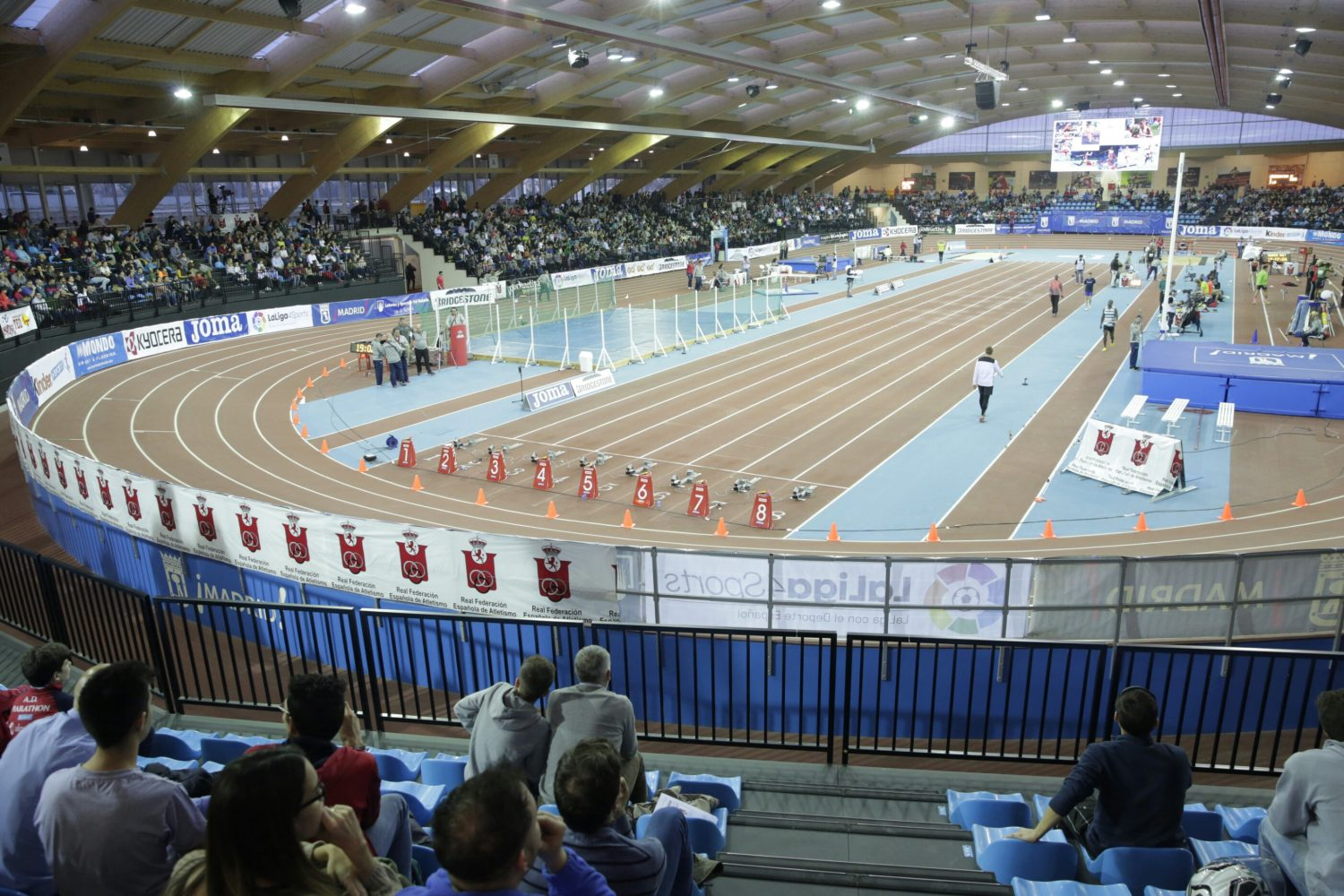
- Level: 2024 World Athletics Indoor Tour

The 2024 Villa de Madrid Indoor Meeting, officially known as the World Indoor Tour Gold Madrid 2024, was the 9th edition of the annual indoor athletics meeting in Madrid, Spain. Held on 23 February, it was the seventh and final leg of the 2024 World Athletics Indoor Tour Gold series – the highest-level international indoor track and field athletics circuit.

The meeting was highlighted by Rajindra Campbell breaking the Jamaican national indoor record to win the shot put, and Devynne Charlton running one hundredth of a second off her 60 metres hurdles world record.

== Results ==
=== World Athletics Indoor Tour ===
Men's 800m
Place	Athlete	Country	Time	Heat	Points
1st place, gold medalist(s)	Catalin Tecuceanu	Italy	1:45.00	1	10
2nd place, silver medalist(s)	Mohamed Attaoui	Spain	1:45.67	1	7
3rd place, bronze medalist(s)	Adrián Ben	Spain	1:45.72	1	5
4	Álvaro de Arriba	Spain	1:45.88	1	3
5	Javier Mirón	Spain	1:46.52	1	
6	Pieter Sisk	Belgium	1:47.52	1	
7	Tom Dradiga	Uganda	1:47.91	2	
8	Pablo Sánchez-Valladares	Spain	1:48.00	2	
9	Elvin Josué Canales	Honduras	1:48.08	2	
10	Ronaldo Olivo	Spain	1:48.14	2	
11	David Barroso	Spain	1:48.47	2	
12	Marino Bloudek	Croatia	1:48.65	2	
13	Hazem Miawad	Egypt	1:49.10	1	
14	David Carranza	Spain	1:49.75	2	
15	Noam Mamu	Israel	1:52.28	2	
	Guillermo Rojo	Spain	DNF	1	
	Saúl Martínez	Spain	DNF	2	

Men's 3000m
Place	Athlete	Country	Time	Points
1st place, gold medalist(s)	Narve Gilje Nordås	Norway	7:41.28	10
2nd place, silver medalist(s)	Ermias Girma	Ethiopia	7:41.94	7
3rd place, bronze medalist(s)	Hugo Hay	France	7:43.37	5
4	Milkesa Fikadu	Ethiopia	7:43.73	3
5	Telahun Haile Bekele	Ethiopia	7:43.76	
6	Elzan Bibić	Serbia	7:44.14	
7	Per Svela	Norway	7:47.86	
8	John Heymans	Belgium	7:49.73	
9	Abderrahman el Khayami	Spain	7:51.47	
10	Adam Maijó Frígola	Spain	8:02.08	
11	Mohamed Abdilaahi	Germany	8:02.10	
12	Sebastian Frey	Austria	8:02.85	
	Miguel de la Torre	Spain	DNF	
	José Carlos Pinto	Portugal	DNF	

Men's Pole Vault
Place	Athlete	Country	Mark	Points
1st place, gold medalist(s)	Piotr Lisek	Poland	5.70 m	10
2nd place, silver medalist(s)	Pedro Buaró	Portugal	5.60 m	7
3rd place, bronze medalist(s)	Aleix Pi	Spain	5.50 m	5
4	Juan Luis Bravo	Spain	5.30 m	3
5	Illja Krawtschenko	Ukraine	5.30 m	
6	Artur Coll	Spain	5.30 m	
7	Isidro Leyva	Spain	5.10 m	

Men's Triple Jump
Place	Athlete	Country	Mark	Points
1st place, gold medalist(s)	Jordan Díaz	Spain	17.52 m	10
2nd place, silver medalist(s)	Max Heß	Germany	16.96 m	7
3rd place, bronze medalist(s)	Yasser Triki	Algeria	16.66 m	5
4	Tiago Pereira	Portugal	16.63 m	3
5	Dimitrios Tsiamis	Greece	16.20 m	
6	Pablo Torrijos	Spain	15.78 m	
7	Teddy Tamgho	France	15.20 m	
	Jean-Marc Pontvianne	France	NM	

Men's Shot Put
Place	Athlete	Country	Mark	Points
1st place, gold medalist(s)	Rajindra Campbell	Jamaica	22.16 m	10
2nd place, silver medalist(s)	Tom Walsh	New Zealand	22.03 m	7
3rd place, bronze medalist(s)	Leonardo Fabbri	Italy	21.68 m	5
4	Chukwuebuka Enekwechi	Nigeria	21.54 m	3
5	Zane Weir	Italy	21.38 m	
6	Roger Steen (shot putter)	United States	21.06 m	
7	Scott Lincoln	Great Britain	20.82 m	
8	Tomáš Staněk	Czech Republic	20.51 m	
9	Carlos Tobalina	Spain	19.36 m	
10	Miguel Gómez	Spain	19.35 m	
11	José Angel Pinedo	Spain	19.03 m	

Women's 400m
Place	Athlete	Country	Time	Heat	Points
1st place, gold medalist(s)	Andrea Miklós	Romania	51.11	1	10
2nd place, silver medalist(s)	Sharlene Mawdsley	Ireland	51.97	1	7
3rd place, bronze medalist(s)	Naomi Van Den Broeck	Belgium	52.01	1	5
4	Cátia Azevedo	Portugal	52.43	1	3
5	Eva Santidrián	Spain	52.67	2	
6	Carmen Avilés	Spain	53.06	2	
7	Daniela Fra	Spain	53.12	2	
8	Berta Segura	Spain	53.35	2	
9	Blanca Hervás	Spain	53.55	2	
10	Gunta Vaičule	Latvia	53.64	1	

Women's 1500m
Place	Athlete	Country	Time	Points
1st place, gold medalist(s)	Ludovica Cavalli	Italy	4:07.01	10
2nd place, silver medalist(s)	Saron Berhe	Ethiopia	4:08.22	7
3rd place, bronze medalist(s)	Águeda Marqués	Spain	4:08.40	5
4	Marta Zenoni	Italy	4:09.55	3
5	Giulia Aprile	Italy	4:10.53	
6	Marta Pérez	Spain	4:11.32	
7	Marina Martínez	Spain	4:14.43	
8	Elise Vanderelst	Belgium	4:14.67	
9	Marta García	Spain	4:14.82	
10	Knight Aciru	Uganda	4:15.04	
	Kimberley Ficenec	Czech Republic	DNF	

Women's 60mH
Place	Athlete	Country	Time	Points
1st place, gold medalist(s)	Devynne Charlton	Bahamas	7.68	10
2nd place, silver medalist(s)	Nadine Visser	Netherlands	7.78	7
3rd place, bronze medalist(s)	Pia Skrzyszowska	Poland	7.83	5
4	Sarah Lavin	Ireland	7.95	3
5	Reetta Hurske	Finland	7.99	
6	Luca Kozák	Hungary	8.06	
7	Mette Graversgaard	Denmark	8.10	
8	Cortney Jones	United States	8.19	

Women's 60mH Round 1
Place	Athlete	Country	Time	Heat
1	Nadine Visser	Netherlands	7.79	1
2	Devynne Charlton	Bahamas	7.79	2
3	Pia Skrzyszowska	Poland	7.83	1
4	Reetta Hurske	Finland	7.99	1
5	Cortney Jones	United States	8.00	1
6	Sarah Lavin	Ireland	8.01	2
7	Luca Kozák	Hungary	8.06	2
8	Mette Graversgaard	Denmark	8.07	2
9	Sacha Alessandrini	France	8.07	2
10	Xenia Benach	Spain	8.10	1
11	Viktória Forster	Slovakia	8.15	2
12	Laura Bankó	Hungary	8.26	2
13	Carmen Sánchez	Spain	8.33	1
14	Sade Maye	Spain	8.47	1
15	Tereza Elena Sinova	Czech Republic	8.90	1

Women's High Jump
Place	Athlete	Country	Mark	Points
1st place, gold medalist(s)	Lia Apostolovski	Slovenia	1.89 m	10
2nd place, silver medalist(s)	Ella Junnila	Finland	1.89 m	7
3rd place, bronze medalist(s)	Airinė Palšytė	Lithuania	1.89 m	5
4	Buse Savaşkan	Turkey	1.85 m	3
5	Yuliya Chumachenko	Ukraine	1.85 m	
6	Solène Gicquel	France	1.85 m	
7	Eleanor Patterson	Australia	1.85 m	
8	Saleta Fernández López	Spain	1.85 m	
9	Una Stancev	Spain	1.80 m	
10	Michaela Hrubá	Czech Republic	1.80 m	

Women's Long Jump
Place	Athlete	Country	Mark	Points
1st place, gold medalist(s)	Florentina Iușco	Romania	6.65 m	10
2nd place, silver medalist(s)	Milica Gardašević	Serbia	6.64 m	7
3rd place, bronze medalist(s)	Fátima Diame	Spain	6.55 m	5
4	Tessy Ebosele	Spain	6.50 m	3
5	Leticia Oro Melo	Brazil	6.35 m	
6	Diana Lesti	Hungary	6.29 m	
7	Rougui Sow	France	6.21 m	
8	Lissandra Maysa Campos	Brazil	6.14 m	

=== Indoor Meeting ===
Men's 60mH
Place	Athlete	Country	Time
1st place, gold medalist(s)	Lorenzo Simonelli	Italy	7.46
2nd place, silver medalist(s)	Asier Martínez	Spain	7.50
3rd place, bronze medalist(s)	Enrique Llopis	Spain	7.51
4	Milan Trajkovic	Cyprus	7.59
5	Jason Joseph	Switzerland	7.72
6	Hassane Fofana	Italy	7.80
	Wilhem Belocian	France	DNF

Women's 800m
Place	Athlete	Country	Time
1st place, gold medalist(s)	Worknesh Mesele	Ethiopia	2:01.01
2nd place, silver medalist(s)	Eloisa Coiro	Italy	2:01.50
3rd place, bronze medalist(s)	Tigist Girma	Ethiopia	2:01.61
4	Lorea Ibarzabal	Spain	2:01.62
5	Elena Bellò	Italy	2:01.93
6	Daniela García	Spain	2:03.67
7	Bregje Sloot	Netherlands	2:04.83
8	Zoya Naumov	Spain	2:06.06
	Sara Gallego	Spain	DNF
