= Yared Nuguse =

American middle-distance runner (born 1999)

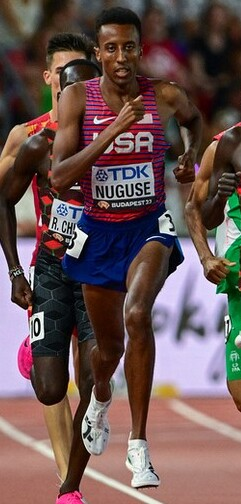
- Nuguse competing in the 1500m final in the 2023 World Athletics Championships in Budapest.

Personal information
- Born: June 1, 1999 (age 27) Washington, D.C., U.S.
- Education: DuPont Manual High School; University of Notre Dame (BS, MS)
- Height: 6 ft 1 in (185 cm)

Sport
- Country: United States
- Sport: Track and field
- Events: 1500 metres, mile
- College team: Notre Dame Fighting Irish
- Team: On Athletics Club (OAC)
- Coached by: Dathan Ritzenhein

Achievements and titles
- Personal bests: Outdoors; 800 m: 1:44.77 (Miramar 2025); 1500 m: 3:27.80 (Paris 2024); Mile: 3:43.97 AR (Eugene 2023); 5000 m: 13:40.62 (Raleigh 2021); Indoors; 1500 m: 3:31.74i+ (New York 2025); Mile: 3:46.63i (New York 2025); 3000 m: 7:28.24i (Boston 2023); 5000 m: 13:02.09i (Boston 2024); Road; Mile: 3:51.9h AR (Düsseldorf 2024)
Medal record
Men's athletics
Representing the United States
Olympic Games
Bronze medal – third place	2024 Paris	1500 m
World Indoor Championships
Silver medal – second place	2024 Glasgow	3000 m
World Road Running Championships
Silver medal – second place	2026 Copenhagen	Mile
Gold medal – first place	2026 Copenhagen	Mile mixed team

Yared Nuguse (/ˈjɑːrɪd nəˈɡuːs/ YAR-id nə-GOOSS; born June 1, 1999) is an American middle-distance runner who specializes in the 1500 meters and mile. He was the 2019 NCAA Division I champion and bronze medalist from the 2024 Summer Olympics in the former. Nuguse is the North American outdoor record holder over the one mile distance. He briefly held the world record in the indoor mile for a five-day stretch from February 8 to February 13, 2025.

Since June 2022, Nuguse has competed for the On Athletics Club under coach Dathan Ritzenhein.

== Early life and background ==
Nuguse was born in Washington, D.C., to Ethiopian parents Alem Nuguse and Mana Berhe. His mother and father are originally from the Tigray Region of Ethiopia; however, Nuguse's father fled the country in the 1980s as a refugee. At first, his father settled in Arlington, Virginia, which is where he later met his wife.

Nuguse is the fourth of six children. He has three older siblings and two younger twin siblings. Nuguse showed little interest in sports during his earlier years of high school and instead preferred to dedicate himself to his studies, science workshops, and bowling. Eventually, he took up running upon the recommendation of his physical education (P.E.) teacher Mick Motley, who was so impressed by Nuguse's running time in the one mile that he referred him to the school's track coach, Tim Holman. Nuguse then finally made the switch from being on the school's bowling team to track and field.

Nuguse attended DuPont Manual High School in Louisville, Kentucky, where he was a successful high school runner prior to attending the University of Notre Dame. He planned on pursuing the necessary degree to attend dental school, wanting to eventually become an orthodontist, but put his dental career on hold to pursue professional running. He graduated in 2021 with a bachelor's degree in biochemistry and in 2022 with a master's degree in management.

== Collegiate competition ==
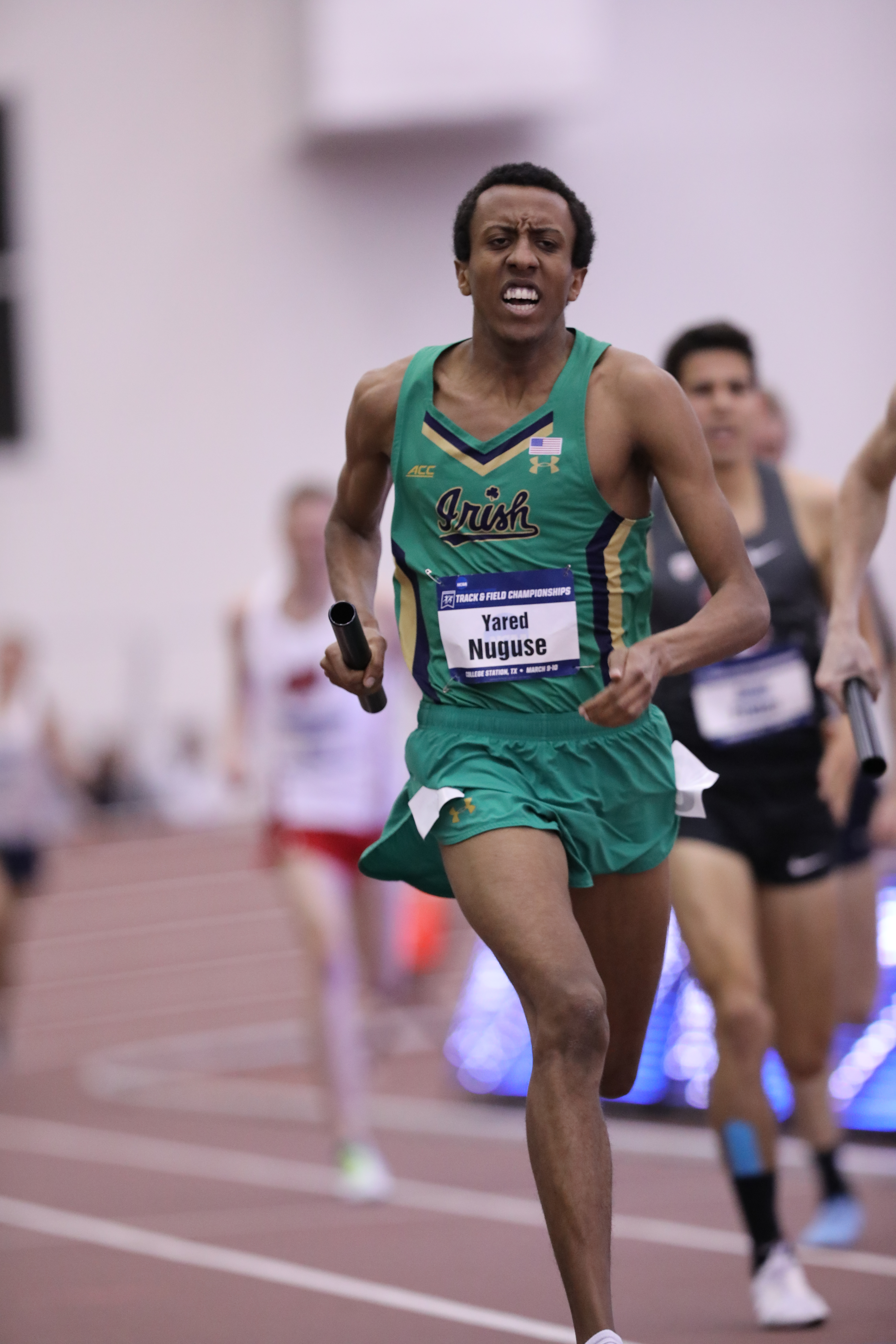
Nuguse competing for the Notre Dame Fighting Irish in 2018.

He competed collegiately for the Notre Dame Fighting Irish. In 2019, he anchored the Fighting Irish to victory in the Distance Medley Relay at the NCAA Division I Indoor T&F Championships before winning the 1500 meters at the NCAA Division I Outdoor T&F Championships just six days past his 20th birthday.

On May 13, 2021, Nuguse set the NCAA 1500 meters record in a time of 3:34.68, which also met the Olympic standard. At the NCAA Division I T&F Championships, he finished second to Cole Hocker in a time of 3:35.60. Nuguse qualified for the 1500 m at the postponed 2020 Tokyo Olympics by finishing third at the U.S. Olympic Trials with his personal best time of 3:34.68, but did not participate in the Games due to a quad injury.

On February 12, 2022, he broke the 18-year-old NCAA indoor 3000 meters record in a time of 7:38.13 at the BU Valentine Invitational. Nuguse capped off his 2022 NCAA indoor season at the 2022 NCAA Division I Indoor Track and Field Championships, where he anchored Notre Dame's Distance Medley Relay team to a second-place finish. He also placed ninth in the 3000 meters. Upon graduation in 2022, he joined the On Athletics Club to compete professionally.

== Professional ==
=== 2023 ===
On January 27, at the Boston University John Thomas Terrier Classic in Boston, the 23-year-old broke the North American indoor record in the 3000 m with a time of 7:28.24, slicing nearly two seconds off Galen Rupp’s mark set in February 2013. Nuguse's time was also faster than the 7:28.48 outdoor record, which Grant Fisher set in 2022. With a quick 3:56.96 last 1600 m, he moved to ninth on the world indoor all-time list.

On February 11, he ran the second-fastest indoor mile in history with a time of 3:47.38 at the Millrose Games in New York, smashing by more than two seconds Bernard Lagat’s (who was a two-time world outdoor champion) 18-year-old North American indoor record of 3:49.98. Nuguse simultaneously also broke Lagat's indoor 1500 m record, which was set in the same race in 2005. He narrowly missed out on Yomif Kejelcha's world indoor mile record of 3:47.01 and eclipsed by more than a second the best mark of famous multiple world record-holder Hicham El Guerrouj. Nuguse covered 200 m segment from 1400 to 1600 m in a very fast 25.94 to beat a quality field and set the second-fastest North American mile ever, indoors or outdoors.

On May 28, Nuguse finished second in the 1500 m at the Rabat Diamond League in a new personal best of 3:33.02, narrowly losing to reigning Olympic champion, Jakob Ingebrigtsen. On June 15, Nuguse finished third in the 1500 m at the Bislett Games in Oslo in a new personal best and then a North American outdoor record of 3:29.02, finishing behind Jakob Ingebrigtsen and Mohamed Katir.

On July 9, Nuguse won the 1500 m at the 2023 USA Outdoor Track and Field Championships held at Hayward Field in Eugene, Oregon. By doing so he qualified for the 2023 World Athletics Championships in Budapest, Hungary. On July 23, Nuguse won his first Diamond League race, winning the 1500m at the London Diamond League in a time of 3:30.44. It was the first win by an American man in a Diamond League 1500 since 2011.

At the 2023 World Athletics Championships in Budapest, Hungary, Nuguse made it to the men's 1500m final, which took place on August 23. He finished fifth, in a time of 3:30.25.

On September 16, at the 2023 Prefontaine Classic/Diamond League final, Nuguse broke the American mile record in a time of 3:43.97 in his second-place finish to Jakob Ingebrigtsen. At the time, this was the fourth fastest performance in history.

On December 9, Nuguse, in his first ever road race, won Honolulu's Kalakaua Merrie Mile, in a time of 3:56.58. Finishing second was Vincent Ciattei in 3:56.81, and third place went to Hobbs Kessler in 3:57.12. Nuguse narrowly missed Kessler's world road mile record of 3:56.13.

=== 2024: Olympic 1500 Meter Bronze Medalist ===
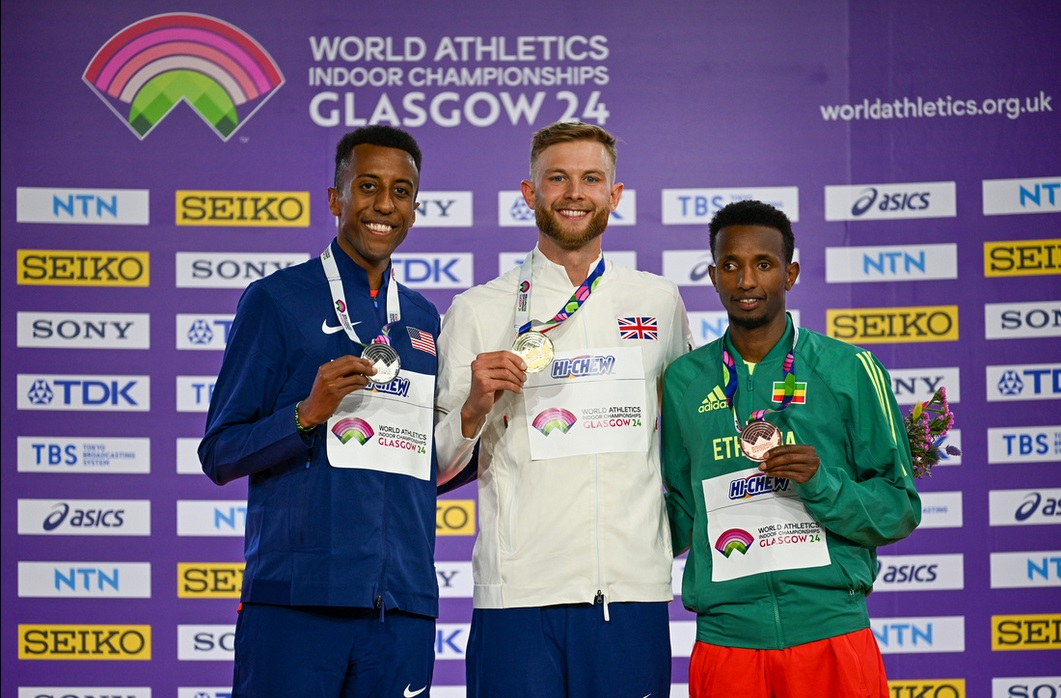
Nuguse (left) on the podium after taking silver at the 2024 World Athletics Indoor Championships – Men's 3000 metres.

On January 26, at Boston University's John Thomas Terrier Classic, Nuguse ran a personal best time of 13:02.09 in the men's 5000m Scarlet Heat, hitting the Olympic entry standard of 13:05.00. He came in third place, behind fellow OAC athlete George Mills (12:58.68) and Under Armour Dark Sky Distance's Edwin Kurgat (12:57.52). On February 11, Nuguse defended his Wanamaker Mile title at the 116th Millrose Games with a time of 3:47.83.

On February 16, Nuguse won the men's 3000m at the 2024 USA Indoor Track and Field Championships, in a time of 7:55.76. On March 2, at the 2024 World Athletics Indoor Championships in Glasgow, Scotland, Nuguse came in second place to Josh Kerr in the men's 3000m final, in a time of 7:43.59.

On April 27, Nuguse opened his outdoor season at the Penn Relays' Olympic Development Elite Mile. Winning in a time of 3:51.06, Nuguse broke the 50 year old Penn Relays mile record of Tony Waldrop, who ran 3:53.2 in 1974.

In late May, Nuguse came third in the historic 2024 Bowerman Mile at the Prefontaine Classic, in a season's best time of 3:46.22, behind Jakob Ingebrigtsen (3:45.60) and Josh Kerr (3:45.34). Given the remarkable depth of the field, which included 2021 Olympic champion Ingebrigtsen, 2023 world champion Kerr, and 2022 world champion Jake Wightman, among others, this race was billed as the "Mile of the Century".

On June 24, at the 2024 Olympic trials, Nuguse took second to Cole Hocker in a time of 3:30.86 to qualify for the 2024 Summer Olympics. Prior to this race, Nuguse had not lost to an American in a 1500m or mile final for nearly two years, since the 2022 US Championships, where he placed eleventh as a collegian.

On July 12, Nuguse finished 4th in the Monaco Diamond League 1500 metres, running a season's best of 3:29.13, being outkicked by Brian Komen & Timothy Cheruiyot of Kenya in the final 100 metres.

On August 6, after passing one of the pre-race favorites Jakob Ingebrigtsen, Nuguse finished third in the 1500 metres at the 2024 Paris Olympics, in a new personal best of 3:27.80, while Ingebrigtsen uncharacteristically finished fourth in a time of 3:28.24. Nuguse was just out-leaned, but nearly caught 2023 World Champion Josh Kerr, who placed second in 3:27.79. Nuguse's compatriot Cole Hocker won the gold in a new Olympic and North American area record of 3:27.65. Ingebrigtsen led at a fast pace for most of the race, but in the final straightaway, was passed by Kerr. Ingebrigtsen ended up moving outwards, which gave Hocker, who is famous for his kick, a chance to pass Ingebrigtsen and eventually Kerr to win gold, while Nuguse passed a fading Ingebrigtsen to get bronze. With Nuguse's bronze and Hocker's gold, the 2024 1500-meter final was the first time in 112 years that the United States won two medals in the event in the same Olympics. Furthermore, a third American, Hobbs Kessler, made it into and competed well in the final, finishing 5th in a personal best of 3:29.45. Eight years prior, at the 2016 Rio 1500-meter final, Matthew Centrowitz ended a 108-year gold medal "Olympic drought" in the event for the United States. The race was highly anticipated given Ingebrigtsen's rivalry with Kerr, with World Athletics President and former middle-distance runner Sebastian Coe labeling it a "Race for the Ages".

On September 1, Nuguse competed in the New Balance KO Meile in Düsseldorf, finishing in a time of 3:51.9 behind Elliot Giles' new road mile world record of 3:51.3. The same month, it was confirmed that Nuguse signed with Michael Johnson's Grand Slam Track league for the 2025 season, competing in the short distance 800 m / 1500 m category.

On September 5, Nuguse won the 1500 meters at the Weltklasse Zürich meeting over Jakob Ingebrigtsen, in a time of 3:29.21 to Ingebrigtsen's 3:29.52. Ingebrigtsen reported as being sick prior to the race after setting a 3000 m world record. The wavelights were set to 3:26.73, but suboptimal weather & track conditions proved to be too much for a world lead or world record in the event for either Nuguse or Ingebrigtsen. Given Nuguse & Ingebrigtsen's presence, in addition to the other Olympic medalists Cole Hocker & Josh Kerr who finished third and fifth respectively, this race was billed as an "Olympic rematch" and the "metric mile of the century". This was Ingebrigtsen's first Diamond League 1500 metres defeat in three years.

=== 2025: Indoor mile world record ===
On February 8, in the Wanamaker Mile, Nuguse set a world record in the indoor mile, running a time of 3:46.63 to win his third Wanamaker title. This improved on the previous world record of Yomif Kejelcha, who ran 3:47.01 in 2019, making Nuguse the first to break 3:47 in the indoor mile distance. En route to the mile, Nuguse improved his area record in the short track 1500 meters, splitting 3:31.74. He held the record for five days until February 13, when it was improved by Jakob Ingebrigtsen to 3:45.14. Nuguse would later make an attempt to take back the world record from Ingebrigtsen at Boston University in March, falling 2.08 seconds short with a time of 3:47.22.

During the 2025 Grand Slam Track season, Nuguse competed in all three Slams in the Short Distance event group. He finished third overall in the Kingston Slam, fourth overall in the Miami Slam, and sixth overall in the Philadelphia Slam. At the Miami Slam, he set a new 800 meter personal best of 1:44.77.

On July 5, after going out at world record pace, Nuguse finished second to Niels Laros in the Bowerman Mile at the Prefontaine Classic, in a season's best time of 3:45.95. On August 2, after leading the pace for most of the race, Nuguse finished fifth at the 2025 USA Outdoor Track and Field Championships.

== Personal life ==
Nuguse has a pet tortoise named Tyro (named for the amino acid tyrosine). He is an avid fan of video games such as Mario Kart, Pokémon and Splatoon, as well as singer-songwriter Taylor Swift.

Nuguse acquired the nickname "The Goose", which is a play on his last name. The phrase "The Goose is loose" is often used when Nuguse succeeds in competitions.

In March 2025, Nuguse announced his one-year anniversary with his boyfriend on Instagram.

== Achievements ==
=== International competitions ===
Year	Competition	Venue	Position	Event	Time	Notes
Representing the United States
2018	World U20 Championships	Tampere, Finland	16th (h)	1500 m	3:49.68	
2021	Olympic Games	Tokyo, Japan	N/A	1500 m	DNS	
2023	World Championships	Budapest, Hungary	5th	1500 m	3:30.35	
2024	World Indoor Championships	Glasgow, Scotland	2nd	3000 m	7:43.59	
2024	Olympic Games	Paris, France	3rd	1500 m	3:27.80	
2026	World Indoor Championships	Toruń, Poland	5th	3000 m	7:37.08	
2026	World Ultimate Championship	Budapest, Hungary	5th	1500 m	3:30.76	
2026	World Road Running Championships	Copenhagen, Denmark	2nd	Road mile	3:52.33	

=== Circuit performances ===
Grand Slam Track results
Slam	Race group	Event	Pl.	Time	Prize money
2025 Kingston Slam	Short distance	1500 m	2nd	3:35.36	US$30,000
2025 Kingston Slam	Short distance	800 m	6th	1:48.16	US$30,000
2025 Miami Slam	Short distance	1500 m	2nd	3:34.65	US$25,000
2025 Miami Slam	Short distance	800 m	4th	1:44.77	US$25,000
2025 Philadelphia Slam	Short distance	800 m	3rd	1:45.36	US$15,000
2025 Philadelphia Slam	Short distance	1500 m	6th	3:35.59	US$15,000

==== Wins and titles ====
(1500 metres wins, other events specified in parentheses)

- Diamond League
  - 2023 (2): London Anniversary Games, Zürich Weltklasse
  - 2024 (1): Zürich Weltklasse
- World Athletics Indoor Tour
  - 2023 (2): Millrose Games (Mile), Villa de Madrid Indoor Meeting
  - 2024: Millrose Games (Mile)
  - 2025: Millrose Games (Mile)

=== National titles ===
- USA Outdoor Track and Field Championships
  - 1500 m: 2023
  - 3000 m: 2024
- USA Indoor Track and Field Championships
  - 3000 m: 2024
