= Guillermo Rojo =

Spanish linguist (born 1947)

The Most Excellent Guillermo Rojo
- Born: Guillermo Rojo Sánchez; 29 March 1947 (age 79); A Coruña, Spain
- Occupations: Linguist, academic
- Employer: University of Santiago de Compostela
- Known for: Corpus linguistics, Spanish syntax
- Title: Professor Emeritus

Academic background
- Education: University of Santiago de Compostela

Seat N of the Real Academia Española
- Incumbent
- Assumed office 7 October 2001
- Preceded by: Torcuato Luca de Tena

Guillermo Rojo Sánchez (born 29 March 1947) is a Spanish linguist, professor emeritus of Spanish linguistics at the University of Santiago de Compostela and a full member of the Royal Spanish Academy (RAE). He is recognized for his work in Spanish syntax, corpus linguistics and computational approaches to grammar.

== Academic career ==
Rojo earned his Ph.D. in Romance Philology in 1972 from the University of Santiago de Compostela (USC). He was appointed professor of Spanish linguistics in 1981, where he served until his retirement in 2017, after which he became professor emeritus.

In 2000, Rojo was elected to Seat N of the Royal Spanish Academy, delivering his inaugural address in October 2001, titled El lugar de la sintaxis en las primeras gramáticas de la Academia.

== Research and contributions ==
Rojo's academic work spans Spanish syntax, sociolinguistics, and functional grammar. He has played a central role in several linguistic corpora projects, including:

- Corpus de Referencia del Español Actual (CREA)
- Corpus Diacrónico del Español (CORDE)
- Galician Reference Corpus (CORGA)
- Corpus del Español del Siglo XXI (CORPES XXI), of which he has been director since 2011.

He also coordinated the syntactic tagging of large corpora and promoted the development of the "Enclave de Ciencia", an RAE platform offering resources on scientific Spanish. Rojo has been a member of multiple scholarly societies including Spanish Society for Natural Language Processing, Association for the teaching of Spanish as a foreign language, Association of Linguistics and Philology of Latin America. He also serves on the editorial boards of journals such as Español Actual, Moenia, Boletín de Lingüística, and others.

== Selected works ==
- 1978. Cláusulas y oraciones. Santiago de Compostela: University of Santiago Press.
- 1983. Aspectos básicos de sintaxis funcional. Santiago de Compostela: University of Santiago Press.
- 1986. El lenguaje, las lenguas y la lingüística. Madrid: Ediciones de la Torre.
- 2021. Introducción a la lingüística de corpus en español. London: Routledge.

== Honors ==
- Full member of the Royal Spanish Academy (Seat N)
- Secretary and treasurer of the RAE (2003–2007; 2015–2021)
- Member of the Academia cubana de la Lengua and the Argentine Academy of Letters

== See also ==
- Royal Spanish Academy
- Corpus linguistics
- Spanish syntax
