= Roger Iribarne =

Cuban hurdler (born 1996)

Personal information
- Full name: Roger Valentin Iribarne Contreras
- Born: 2 January 1996 (age 30)
- Height: 1.94 m (6 ft 4 in)
- Weight: 78 kg (172 lb)

Sport
- Sport: Athletics
- Event: 110 metres hurdles
- Club: Benfica

Roger Valentin Iribarne Contreras (born 2 January 1996) is a Cuban athlete specialising in the high hurdles. He represented his country at the 2017 World Championships reaching the semifinals. In addition, he won the silver medal at the 2015 Pan American Junior Championships.

His personal best in the 110 metres hurdles is 13.39 seconds (-0.1 m/s) set in Havana in 2017.

== International competitions ==
Year	Competition	Venue	Position	Event	Notes
Representing Cuba
2013	World Youth Championships	Donetsk, Ukraine	4th	110 m hurdles (91.4 cm)	13.46
2014	World Junior Championships	Eugene, United States	12th (sf)	110 m hurdles (99 cm)	13.87
2015	Pan American Junior Championships	Edmonton, Canada	2nd	110 m hurdles (99 cm)	13.32
2017	World Championships	London, United Kingdom	15th (sf)	110 m hurdles	13.43
2018	World Indoor Championships	Birmingham, United Kingdom	7th	60 m hurdles	7.78
2018	Central American and Caribbean Games	Barranquilla, Colombia	3rd	110 m hurdles	13.58
2018	Central American and Caribbean Games	Barranquilla, Colombia	5th	4 × 100 m relay	39.03
2018	NACAC Championships	Toronto, Canada	–	110 m hurdles	DQ
2019	Pan American Games	Lima, Peru	8th (h)	110 m hurdles	13.79^{1}
2019	World Championships	Doha, Qatar	34th (h)	110 m hurdles	14.37

^{1}Disqualified in the final
