= New Balance Indoor Grand Prix =

Annual indoor track and field meet

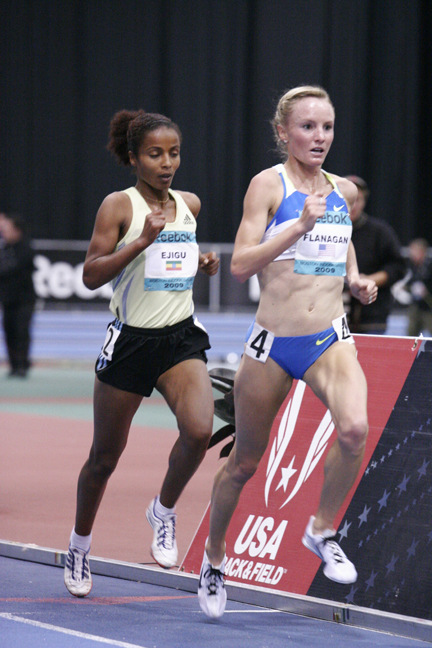
- Shalane Flanagan and Sentayehu Ejigu at the 2009 edition
- Date: January or February
- Location: Roxbury, Boston, United States
- Event type: Track and field
- Established: 1996
- Website: New Balance Indoor Grand Prix
- 2026 New Balance Indoor Grand Prix

The New Balance Indoor Grand Prix, formerly known as the Boston Indoor Games, is an annual indoor track and field meet which is held in late January or early February at the Track at New Balance. Prior to 2023, it was hosted at the Reggie Lewis Track and Athletic Center. It was first held in Roxbury, a neighborhood in Boston, in 1996 and has become one of the foremost events of its type in the United States, alongside the Millrose Games.

== Editions ==
New Balance Indoor Grand Prix editions
Ed.	Name	Date	Venue	Ref.
1st	1996 Boston Indoor Games	26 Jan 1996	Reggie Lewis Center	
2nd	1997 Boston Indoor Games	30 Jan 1997	Reggie Lewis Center	
3rd	1998 New Balance Invitational	19 Feb 1998	Reggie Lewis Center	
4th	1999 New Balance Invitational	7 Feb 1999	Reggie Lewis Center	
5th	2000 New Balance Invitational	6 Feb 2000	Reggie Lewis Center	
6th	2001 New Balance Invitational	4 Feb 2001	Reggie Lewis Center	
7th	2002 adidas Boston Indoor Games	27 Jan 2002	Reggie Lewis Center	
8th	2003 adidas Boston Indoor Games	31 Jan 2003	Reggie Lewis Center	
9th	2004 adidas Boston Indoor Games	30 Jan 2004	Reggie Lewis Center	
10th	2005 Reebok Boston Indoor Games	28 Jan 2005	Reggie Lewis Center	
11th	2006 Reebok Boston Indoor Games	27 Jan 2006	Reggie Lewis Center	
12th	2007 Reebok Boston Indoor Games	26 Jan 2007	Reggie Lewis Center	
13th	2008 Reebok Boston Indoor Games	25 Jan 2008	Reggie Lewis Center	
14th	2009 Reebok Boston Indoor Games	7 Feb 2009	Reggie Lewis Center	
15th	2010 Reebok Boston Indoor Games	5 Feb 2010	Reggie Lewis Center	
16th	2011 New Balance Indoor Grand Prix	4 Feb 2011	Reggie Lewis Center	
17th	2012 New Balance Indoor Grand Prix	3 Feb 2012	Reggie Lewis Center	
18th	2013 New Balance Indoor Grand Prix	1 Feb 2013	Reggie Lewis Center	
19th	2014 New Balance Indoor Grand Prix	7 Feb 2014	Reggie Lewis Center	
20th	2015 New Balance Indoor Grand Prix	6 Feb 2015	Reggie Lewis Center	
21st	2016 New Balance Indoor Grand Prix	13 Feb 2016	Reggie Lewis Center	
22nd	2017 New Balance Indoor Grand Prix	27 Jan 2017	Reggie Lewis Center	
23rd	2018 New Balance Indoor Grand Prix	9 Feb 2018	Reggie Lewis Center	
24th	2019 New Balance Indoor Grand Prix	25 Jan 2019	Reggie Lewis Center	
25th	2020 New Balance Indoor Grand Prix	24 Jan 2020	Reggie Lewis Center	
26th	2021 New Balance Indoor Grand Prix	13 Feb 2021	Ocean Breeze Athletic Complex	
27th	2022 New Balance Indoor Grand Prix	6 Feb 2022	Ocean Breeze Athletic Complex	
28th	2023 New Balance Indoor Grand Prix	4 Feb 2023	The Track at New Balance	
29th	2024 New Balance Indoor Grand Prix	4 Feb 2024	The Track at New Balance	
30th	2025 New Balance Indoor Grand Prix	2 Feb 2025	The Track at New Balance	
31st	2026 New Balance Indoor Grand Prix	24 Jan 2026	The Track at New Balance	

== History ==
The competition is part of USA Track and Field's Visa Championship Series and attracts high-caliber athletes, including Olympic and World medalists. The 2016 edition was part of the inaugural IAAF World Indoor Tour.

Since its inception, a total of six world records have been set at the event. Among them are performances by Ethiopian runner Tirunesh Dibaba, who set a world indoor record over 5000 metres in 2005 and improved that mark in 2007. The Boston Indoor Games has also featured numerous national records and United States all-comers records (the best performances recorded on US soil).

The competition has had a number of title sponsors over its history, including adidas in the early 2000s and Reebok from 2005 to 2010. New Balance became the current title sponsor in 2011. The rights to the event are owned by Global Athletics & Marketing and Mark Wetmore is the meeting director.

At the 2012 meeting, Jenn Suhr broke her own American record in the pole vault, clearing 4.88 m to become the second-highest vaulter of all time.

In 2021, the event was relocated to the Ocean Breeze Athletic Complex in Staten Island, New York as due to the COVID-19 pandemic the Boston venue was serving as a mass vaccination site. The 2023 edition moved to the TRACK at New Balance, a new state-of-the-art indoor track and field facility located in Brighton, Boston.

== World records ==
Over the course of its history, five world records and three world bests have been set at the event.

World records & bests set at the New Balance Indoor Grand Prix
Year	Event	Record	Athlete	Nationality	Ref.
2000	4 × 800 m relay	7:13.94	Global Athletics & Marketing: Joey Woody; Karl Paranya; Rich Kenah; David Krummenacker	United States	
2005	5000 m	14:32.93	Tirunesh Dibaba	Ethiopia	
2007	5000 m	14:27.42	Tirunesh Dibaba	Ethiopia	
2008	Two miles	9:10.50	Meseret Defar	Ethiopia	
2014	4 × 800 m relay	7:13.11	USA All Stars: Richard Jones 1:51.01; David Torrence 1:47.46; Duane Solomon 1:47.99; Eric Sowinski 1:46.67	United States	
2015	Distance medley relay	10:42.57 ^{[WB]}	NB - USA: Sarah Brown 3:15.54 (1200m); Mahagony Jones 53.59 (400m); Megan Krumpoch 2:05.68 (800m); Brenda Martinez 4:27.77 (1600 m)	United States	
2017	Distance medley relay	10:40.31 ^{[WB]}	USA A: Emma Coburn 3:18.40 (1200m); Sydney McLaughlin 52.32 (400m); Brenda Martinez 2:01.92 (800m); Jenny Simpson 4:27.66 (1600 m)	United States	
2023	500 m	1:05.63 ^{[WB]}	Femke Bol	Netherlands	
2026	2000 m	4:48.79 ^{[WB]}	Hobbs Kessler	United States	
2026	800 m	1:42.50	Josh Hoey	United States	

== Meet records ==
=== Men ===
Men's meeting records of the New Balance Indoor Grand Prix
Event	Record	Athlete	Nationality	Date	Venue	Ref.
60 m	6.44	Noah Lyles	United States	4 February 2024	Boston	
200 m	20.64	Trayvon Bromell	United States	6 February 2022	Staten Island	
300 m	32.10	Jereem Richards	Trinidad and Tobago	10 February 2018	Boston	
400 m	45.34	Michael Norman	United States	13 February 2021	Staten Island	
500 m	1:01.84	Jarrin Solomon	Trinidad and Tobago	8 February 2014	Boston	
600 m	1:14.39	Donavan Brazier	United States	25 January 2020	Boston	
800 m	1:42.50	Josh Hoey	United States	26 January 2026	Boston	
1000 m	2:14.74	Marco Arop	Canada	4 February 2024	Boston	
1500 m	3:32.35	Olli Hoare	Australia	13 February 2021	Staten Island	
Mile	3:51.61	Nick Willis	New Zealand	7 February 2015	Boston	
2000 m	4:48.79	Hobbs Kessler	United States	24 January 2026	Boston	
3000 m	7:27.57	Cameron Myers	Australia	24 January 2026	Boston	
Two miles	8:13.92	Justyn Knight	Canada	13 February 2021	Staten Island	
5000 m	13:11.50	Bernard Lagat	United States	6 February 2010	Boston	
60 m hurdles	7.35	Grant Holloway	United States	4 February 2024	Boston	
High jump	2.33 m	Trey Culver	United States	13 February 2021	Staten Island	
Pole vault	6.06 m	Steven Hooker	Australia	7 February 2009	Boston	
Long jump	8.20 m	Carey McLeod	Jamaica	4 February 2024	Boston	
Triple jump	16.93 m	LaMark Carter	United States	20 February 1998	Boston	
Shot put	21.66 m	Adam Nelson	United States	29 January 2005	Boston	
4 × 400 m relay	3:05.66	Team Nike	United States	27 January 2002	Boston	
4 × 800 m relay	7:13.11	US All Stars: Richard Jones 1:51.01; David Torrence 1:47.46; Duane Solomon 1:47.99; Eric Sowinski 1:46.67	United States	8 February 2014	Boston	

=== Women ===
Women's meeting records of the New Balance Indoor Grand Prix
Event	Record	Athlete	Nationality	Date	Venue	Ref.
60 m	7.02	Aleia Hobbs	United States	4 February 2023	Boston	
200 m	22.99	Muna Lee	United States	29 January 2005	Boston	
300 m	35.73	Gabby Thomas	United States	13 February 2021	Staten Island	
400 m	50.21	Shaunae Miller-Uibo	Bahamas	13 February 2021	Staten Island	
500 m	1:05.63	Femke Bol	Netherlands	4 February 2023	Boston	
600 m	1:27.31	Raevyn Rogers	United States	26 January 2019	Boston	
800 m	1:57.79	Jolanda Čeplak	Slovenia	27 January 2002	Boston	
1000 m	2:35.29	Regina Jacobs	United States	6 February 2000	Boston	
1500 m	3:58.11	Gudaf Tsegay	Ethiopia	4 February 2024	Boston	
Mile	4:23.32	Heather MacLean	United States	2 February 2025	Boston	
2000 m	5:35.46	Dawit Seyaum	Ethiopia	7 February 2015	Boston	
3000 m	8:24.93	Jessica Hull	Australia	4 February 2024	Boston	
Two miles	9:10.28	Elinor Purrier	United States	13 February 2021	Staten Island	
5000 m	14:27.42	Tirunesh Dibaba	Ethiopia	27 January 2007	Boston	
60 m hurdles	7.72	Tia Jones	United States	4 February 2024	Boston	
High jump	1.95 m	Chaunte Howard	United States	21 January 2006	Boston	
Pole vault	4.88 m	Jennifer Suhr	United States	4 February 2012	Boston	
Pole vault	4.88 m	Jennifer Suhr	United States	14 February 2016	Boston	
Long jump	6.86 m	Tara Davis-Woodhall	United States	4 February 2024	Boston	
Triple jump	14.01 m	Patrícia Mamona	Portugal	28 January 2017	Boston	
Shot put	19.28 m	Magdalyn Ewen	United States	26 January 2019	Boston	
Distance medley relay	10:40.31	Emma Coburn 3:18.40 (1200m); Sydney McLaughlin 52.32 (400m); Brenda Martinez 2:01.92 (800m); Jenny Simpson 4:27.66 (1600 m)	United States	28 January 2017	Boston	
