= Noah Williams (sprinter) =

American sprinter

Personal information
- Nationality: American
- Born: January 1, 1999 (age 27)
- Home town: Rochester, New York
- Education: McQuaid Jesuit High School
- Height: 5 ft 11 in (180 cm)

Sport
- Sport: Athletics
- Events: 200 meters, 400 meters
- College team: Akron Zips, LSU Tigers
- Coached by: Lance Brauman

Noah Williams (born January 1, 1999) is an American sprinter who specializes in the 400 meters. He competed collegiately for Louisiana State University after transferring from the University of Akron, where he won the 400 meters at the 2021 NCAA Indoor National Championships as well as the 4 x 100 meter relay at the 2021 Outdoor National Championships. He also competed in the 4 x 100 meter relay at the 2022 World Athletics Indoor Championships.

His personal best time of 44.71 in the indoor 400 m, set in Fayetteville, Arkansas in 2021, is the sixth fastest all time.

== Personal bests ==
- 60 m – 6.51i (Rochester 2016)
- 200 m – 20.36 (Baton Rouge 2021)
  - Indoor – 21.09i (Albuquerque 2020)
- 300 m – 33.39i (Louisville 2022)
- 400 m – 44.30 (Baton Rouge 2022)
  - Indoor – 44.71i (Fayetteville 2021)
