= List of United States records in track and field =

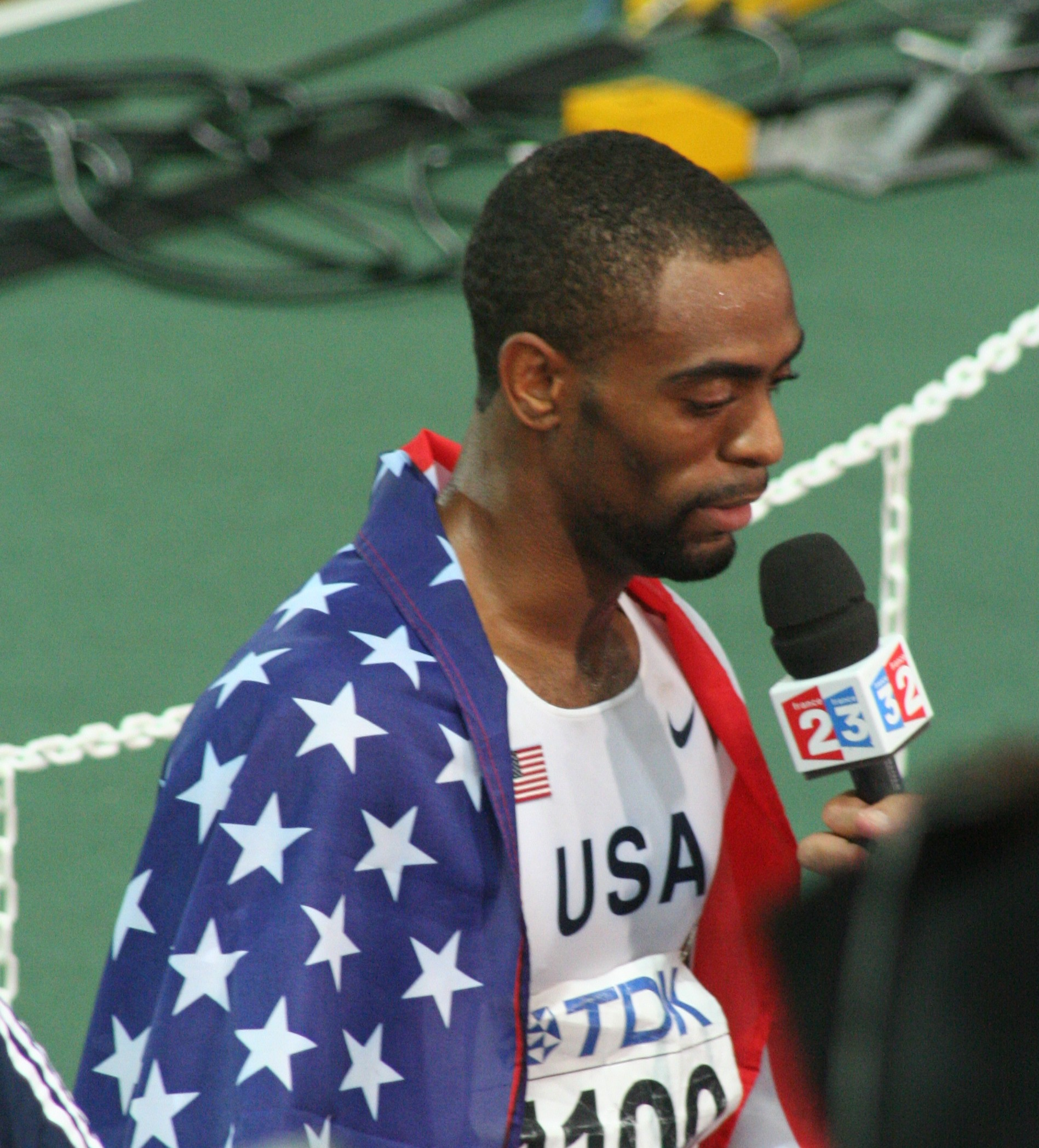
Tyson Gay currently holds the national record for the 100 m.

The following are the national records in track and field in the United States. Some of the records are maintained by USA Track & Field (USATF). Outdoor times for track races between 200 meters to 10,000 meters are set on 400-meter unbanked tracks. Indoor marks are established on 200-meter tracks, banked or unbanked. Indoor tracks longer than 200 meters are considered "oversized" and times are not accepted for record purposes. Indoor sprint races (50 to 60 meters) are held on level straight-aways.

American athletes are successful on an international stage with many American records being at the same time world records.

== Outdoor ==
Key: Awaiting ratification Record not kept by USATF Not ratified or later rescinded by USATF

# = not officially ratified by IAAF
a = not record eligible according to World Athletics rule 260.28, but are regarded by USATF as Noteworthy Performances/Road Bests

=== Men ===
==== Olympic events ====
Event	Record	Athlete	Team	Date	Meet	Place	Ref.	Video
100 m	9.69 (+2.0 m/s)	Tyson Gay	Adidas	September 20, 2009	Golden Grand Prix	Shanghai, China		
200 m	19.31 (+0.4 m/s)	Noah Lyles	United States	July 21, 2022	World Championships	Eugene, United States		
400 m	43.18	Michael Johnson	Nike	August 26, 1999	World Championships	Seville, Spain		
800 m	1:41.67	Bryce Hoppel	Adidas	August 10, 2024	Olympic Games	Saint-Denis, France		
1500 m	3:27.40	Bernard Lagat	Nike	August 6, 2004	Weltklasse Zürich	Zürich, Switzerland		
5000 m	12:46.96	Grant Fisher	Bowerman TC	September 2, 2022	Memorial Van Damme	Brussels, Belgium		
5000 m	12:45.27	Nico Young	Adidas	June 12, 2025	Bislett Games	Oslo, Norway		
10,000 m	26:33.84	Grant Fisher	Bowerman TC	March 6, 2022	The TEN	San Juan Capistrano, United States		
Marathon	2:04:43	Conner Mantz	Nike	October 12, 2025	Chicago Marathon	Chicago, United States		
Marathon	2:03:45 a (Note: downhill point-to-point course)	Zouhair Talbi	Unattached	April 20, 2026	Boston Marathon	Boston, United States		
110 m hurdles	12.80 (+0.3 m/s)	Aries Merritt	Reebok	September 7, 2012	Memorial Van Damme	Brussels, Belgium		
110 m hurdles	12.75 (+1.0 m/s)	Ja'Kobe Tharp	Auburn Tigers	10 June 2026	NCAA Division I Championships	Eugene, United States		
400 m hurdles	46.17	Rai Benjamin	United States	August 3, 2021	Olympic Games	Tokyo, Japan		
3000 m steeplechase	8:00.45	Evan Jager	Nike	July 4, 2015	Meeting Areva	Saint-Denis, France		
High jump	2.40 m (7 ft 10 1/4 in)	Charles Austin	Unattached	August 7, 1991	Weltklasse Zürich	Zürich, Switzerland		
Pole vault	6.07 m	KC Lightfoot	Puma	June 3, 2023	Music City Track Festival	Nashville, United States		
Long jump	8.95 m (29 ft 4 1/4 in) (+0.3 m/s)	Mike Powell	USA National	August 30, 1991	World Championships	Tokyo, Japan		
Triple jump	18.21 m (59 ft 8 3/4 in) (+0.2 m/s)	Christian Taylor	United States	August 27, 2015	World Championships	Beijing, China		
Shot put	23.56 m (77 ft 3 1/2 in)	Ryan Crouser	Nike	May 27, 2023	USATF Los Angeles Grand Prix	Westwood, United States		
Discus throw	71.32 m (233 ft 11 3/4 in)	Ben Plucknett	Southern California Striders	June 4, 1983		Eugene, United States		
Discus throw	72.34 m (237 ft 4 in) # (Note: disqualified by doping test, but ratified by USATF)	Ben Plucknett	Southern California Striders	July 7, 1981		Stockholm, Sweden		
Discus throw	72.45 m (237 ft 8 1/4 in)	Sam Mattis	New York Athletic Club	9 April 2026	Oklahoma Throws Series World Invitational	Ramona, United States		
Hammer throw	82.71 m (271 ft 4 1/4 in)	Rudy Winkler	Tracksmith/ New York AC	June 20, 2021	US Olympic Trials	Eugene, United States		
Hammer throw	83.16 m (272 ft 10 in)	Rudy Winkler		July 5, 2025	Prefontaine Classic	Eugene, United States		
Javelin throw	91.29 m (299 ft 6 in)	Breaux Greer	Adidas	June 21, 2007	USA Championships	Indianapolis, United States		
Decathlon
Decathlon	9045 pts	Ashton Eaton		August 28–29, 2015	World Championships	Beijing, China		
Decathlon	100m (wind) / Long jump (wind) / Shot put / High jump / 400m / 110m H (wind) / Discus / Pole vault / Javelin / 1500m; 10.23 (−0.4 m/s) / 7.88 m (+0.0 m/s) / 14.52 m / 2.01 m / 45.00 WDB / 13.69 (−0.2 m/s) / 43.34 m / 5.20 m / 63.63 m / 4:17.52							
20 km walk (road)	1:22:02	Timothy Seaman		May 22, 2004		Vallensbæk, Denmark		
20 km walk (road)	1:21:48 (Note: short distance)	Tim Lewis		1986				
50 km walk (road)	3:48:04	Curt Clausen	New York Athletic Club	May 2, 1999		Mézidon, France		
4 × 100 m relay	37.10	Christian Coleman; Justin Gatlin; Mike Rodgers; Noah Lyles	United States	October 5, 2019	World Championships	Doha, Qatar		
4 × 100 m relay	37.04 X	Trell Kimmons; Justin Gatlin; Tyson Gay; Ryan Bailey	United States	August 11, 2012	Olympic Games	London, United Kingdom		
4 × 400 m relay	2:54.29	Andrew Valmon; Quincy Watts; Butch Reynolds; Michael Johnson	United States	August 22, 1993	World Championships	Stuttgart, Germany		
4 × 400 m relay	2:54.20 X	Jerome Young; Antonio Pettigrew; Tyree Washington; Michael Johnson	United States	July 22, 1998	Goodwill Games	Uniondale, United States		

==== Non-Olympic track events ====
Event	Record	Athlete	Team	Date	Meet	Place	Ref.
100 y	9.10+ (−0.4 m/s)	Justin Gatlin		June 17, 2014	Golden Spike Ostrava	Ostrava, Czech Republic	
150 m (straight)	14.41+ (−0.4 m/s)	Tyson Gay	United States	16 May 2010	Manchester City Games	Manchester, United Kingdom	
150 m (straight)	14.41 (+0.3 m/s)	Noah Lyles	United States	18 May 2024	Atlanta City Games	Atlanta, United States	
150 m (bend)	14.67 (±0.0 m/s)	Noah Lyles	United States	16 June 2026	65th Ostrava Golden Spike	Ostrava, Czech Republic	
200 m (straight)	19.41 (−0.4 m/s)	Tyson Gay	United States	May 16, 2010	Manchester City Games	Manchester, United Kingdom	
300 m	30.85 A	Michael Johnson	Nike	March 24, 2000	Engen Grand Prix	Pretoria, South Africa	
600 m	1:12.81	Johnny Gray	Santa Monica Track Club	May 24, 1986		Santa Monica, United States	
1000 m	2:13.9	Rick Wohlhuter	University of Chicago TC	July 30, 1974	Bislett Games	Oslo, Norway	
Mile	3:43.97	Yared Nuguse	On Athletics Club	September 16, 2023	Prefontaine Classic	Eugene, United States	
2000 m	4:52.44	Jim Spivey	Athletics West	September 15, 1987	Athletissima	Lausanne, Switzerland	
3000 m	7:25.47	Grant Fisher	Bowerman Track Club	September 17, 2023	Prefontaine Classic	Eugene, United States	
Two miles	8:07.07	Matt Tegenkamp	Nike	June 10, 2007	Prefontaine Classic	Eugene, United States	
20,000 m (track)	58:25.0	Bill Rodgers	Greater Boston Track Club	August 9, 1977		Boston, United States	
One hour	12.77 miles / 20547 m	Bill Rodgers	Greater Boston TC	August 9, 1977		Boston, United States	
50,000 m (track)	2:42:31	CJ Albertson		November 8, 2020		Clovis, United States	
50 miles (track)	5:21:21	Ken Moffitt		September 9, 1978		Santa Monica, United States	
100 km (track)	6:39:09+	Zach Bitter	Altra	December 14, 2019	Desert Solstice Track Invitational	Phoenix, United States	
100 miles (track)	11:40:55	Zach Bitter	Altra	December 19, 2015	Desert Solstice Track Invitational	Phoenix, United States	
12 hours (track)	163.785 km	Zach Bitter	Altra	14 December 2013	Desert Solstice Track Invitational	Phoenix, United States	
200 km (track)	16:55:12+	Rae Clark		29 September 1990		Portland, United States	
24 hours (track)	278.432 km	Nick Coury		12 December 2021		Phoenix, United States	
10,000 m walk (track)	39:43.85	Timothy Seaman	New York Athletic Club	April 24, 1999		Philadelphia, United States	
20,000 m walk (track)	1:23:00.1	Trevor Barron	New York Athletic Club	June 30, 2012	USA Olympic Trials	Eugene, United States	
50,000 m walk (track)	3:59:41.2	Herm Nelson	Club Northwest	9 June 1996		Seattle, United States	
200 m hurdles	22.74 (−0.8 m/s)	Kevin Young		August 31, 1992		Belfast, United Kingdom	
200 m hurdles (straight)	21.9y h (+1.4 m/s)	Don Styron		April 2, 1960		Baton Rouge, United States	
200 m hurdles (straight)	22.18 (−0.6 m/s)	Amere Lattin		May 23, 2021	Adidas Boost Boston Games	Boston, United States	
300 m hurdles	33.22	Rai Benjamin	United States	12 June 2025	Bislett Games	Oslo, Norway	
440 y hurdles	48.7	Jim Bolding		July 25, 1974	Turin International Meeting	Turin, Italy	
2000 m steeplechase	5:19.68	Duncan Hamilton		September 3, 2024	Copenhagen Athletics Games	Copenhagen, Denmark	
4 × 200 m relay	1:18.68	Michael Marsh; Leroy Burrell; Floyd Heard; Carl Lewis	Santa Monica Track Club	April 17, 1994	Mt. SAC Relays	Walnut, United States	
Sprint medley relay (2,2,4,8)	3:10.76	Carl Lewis; Ferran Tyler; Benny Hollis; Johnny Gray	Santa Monica Track Club	April 6, 1985		Tempe, United States	
4 × 800 m relay	7:02.82	Jebreh Harris 1:47.05; Khadevis Robinson 1:44.03; Sam Burley 1:46.05; David Krummenacker 1:45.69	United States	August 25, 2006	Memorial Van Damme	Brussels, Belgium	
Distance medley relay	9:14.58	Brannon Kidder (2:49.60) 1200 m Brandon Miller (46.60) 400 m Isaiah Harris (1:45.75) 800 m Henry Wynne (3:52.64) 1600 m	Brooks Beasts	19 April 2024	Oregon Relays	Eugene	
4 × 1500 m relay	14:34.97	Evan Jager; Grant Fisher; Sean McGorty; Lopez Lomong	Bowerman Track Club	July 31, 2020	Portland Intrasquad Meeting	Portland, United States	
4 × mile relay	15:52.56	Lucas Guerra (3:59.61); Parker Stokes (3:59.89); Camden Gilmore (3:58.82); Abel Teffra (3:54.26)	Georgetown Hoyas	27 April 2024	Penn Relays	Philadelphia, United States	
4×110m Shuttle hurdles relay	52.94	Jason Richardson; Aleec Harris; Aries Merritt; David Oliver	United States	April 25, 2015	Drake Relays	Des Moines, United States	

==== Non-Olympic road events ====
Event	Record	Athlete	Team	Date	Meet	Place	Ref.	Video
Mile (road)	3:51.9 h	Yared Nuguse		1 September 2024	New Balance Kö Meile	Düsseldorf, Germany		
Mile (road)	3:45.0 a	Marco Langon	Diadora	13 September 2026	New Balance Fifth Avenue Mile	New York City, United States		
5 km (road)	13:14	Andrew Hunter	Asics	19 September 2026	World Road Running Championships	Copenhagen, Denmark		
10 km (road)	27:26	Conner Mantz	Nike	August 2, 2025	Beach to Beacon 10K	Cape Elizabeth, United States		
10 km (road)	27:23 a	Mark Nenow		April 1, 1984	Crescent City Classic	New Orleans, United States		
15 km (road)	42:05+	Conner Mantz	Nike	January 19, 2025	Houston Half Marathon	Houston, United States		
10 miles	45:15	Alex Maier	Puma	6 April 2025	USA 10 Mile Road Running Championships	Washington, United States		
20 km	56:16	Conner Mantz	United States	September 1, 2025	USA 20 km Road Running Championships	New Haven, Connecticut, United States		
Half marathon	59:17	Conner Mantz	Nike	January 19, 2025	Houston Half Marathon	Houston, United States		
Half marathon	59:15a (Note: point-to-point course, not record eligible)	Conner Mantz	Nike	March 16, 2025	New York City Half Marathon	New York City, United States		
25 km (road)	1:12:17	Casey Clinger	Brooks	May 10, 2025	Amway River Bank Run (USA 25 km Open and Masters Championships)	Grand Rapids, United States		
30 km (road)	1:28:15+	Vincent Mauri	Asics	11 October 2026	Chicago Marathon	Chicago, United States		
50 km (road)	2:38:43	CJ Albertson		October 8, 2022	Ruth Anderson Memorial Run 50k	San Francisco, United States		
50 miles (road)	4:48:21	Charlie Lawrence		11 November 2023	Tunnel Hill 50 Mile	Vienna, United States		
100 km (road)	6:07:10 A	Charlie Lawrence	Adidas	December 20, 2025	Desert Solstice Track Invitational	Boulder, United States		
100 km (road)	6:03:47# (Note: Non-ratifiable as the athlete ran behind a car, wore unratified prototype shoes, and was paced by rotating pacemakers)	Charlie Lawrence	Adidas	August 26, 2025	Chasing 100	Nardò Ring, Italy		
100 miles (road)	11:19:13+ (Note: counts as road event because of uncertified track)	Zach Bitter	Altra	August 24–25, 2019	Six Days in the Dome – The Redux 24h Day 2	Milwaukee, United States		
12 hours (road)	168.792 km (Note: counts as road event because of uncertified track)	Zach Bitter	Altra	August 24–25, 2019	Six Days in the Dome – The Redux 24h Day 2	Milwaukee, United States		
200 km (road)	17:34:20+	Olivier LeBlond	United States	October 26–27, 2019	IAU 24 Hour World Championship	Albi, France		
24 hours (road)	277.542 km	Mike Morton	United States	9 September 2012	IAU 24 Hour World Championship	Katowice, Poland		
5 km walk (road)	19:09	Timothy Seaman		September 13, 2003		Hildesheim, Germany		
10 km walk (road)	39:22.7	Timothy Seaman		April 20, 2004		Storetveitmarsjen, Norway		
15 km walk (road)	1:01:30+	Timothy Seaman		May 22, 2004		Vallensbæk, Denmark		
35 km walk (road)	2:38:16	Nick Christie	Newfeel	19 December 2021		Dublin, Ireland		
Marathon road relay (Ekiden)	1:59:08	Ryan Hall (13:22); Matt Gonzales (28:15); Ian Dobson (13:46); Brian Sell (28:28); Fernando Cabada (14:11); Josh Moen (21:06)	United States	November 23, 2005	International Chiba Ekiden	Chiba, Japan		

=== Women ===
==== Olympic events ====
Event	Record	Athlete	Team	Date	Meet	Place	Ref.	Video
100 m	10.49 (±0.0 m/s)	Florence Griffith Joyner	World Class AC	July 16, 1988	US Olympic Trials	Indianapolis, United States		
200 m	21.34 (+1.3 m/s)	Florence Griffith Joyner	United States	September 29, 1988	Olympic Games	Seoul, South Korea		
400 m	48.70	Sanya Richards	Nike	September 17, 2006	World Cup	Olympic Stadium, Athens, Greece		
400 m	47.78	Sydney McLaughlin-Levrone	United States	September 18, 2025	World Championships	Tokyo, Japan		
800 m	1:54.97	Athing Mu	United States	September 17, 2023	Prefontaine Classic	Eugene, United States		
1500 m	3:54.99	Shelby Houlihan	Bowerman TC	October 5, 2019	World Championships	Doha, Qatar		
5000 m	14:19.45	Alicia Monson	On Athletics Club	July 23, 2023	Anniversary Games	London, United Kingdom		
10,000 m	30:03.82	Alicia Monson	On Athletics Club	March 4, 2023	The TEN	San Juan Capistrano, United States		
Marathon	2:18:29 Mx	Emily Sisson	New Balance	October 9, 2022	Chicago Marathon	Chicago, United States		
Marathon	2:22:01 Wo	Sara Hall	Asics	October 4, 2020	London Marathon	London, United Kingdom		
100 m hurdles	12.20 (+0.3 m/s)	Kendra Harrison	United States	July 22, 2016	London Grand Prix	London, United Kingdom		
100 m hurdles	12.17 (+2.0 m/s)	Masai Russell	United States	May 2, 2025	Miami Slam	Miramar, United States		
100 m hurdles	12.14 (+0.5 m/s)	Masai Russell	United States	May 23, 2026	Xiamen Diamond League	Xiamen, China		
100 m hurdles	12.09 (±0.0 m/s)	Masai Russell	United States	August 27, 2026	Weltklasse Zürich	Zurich, Switzerland		
400 m hurdles	50.37	Sydney McLaughlin-Levrone	United States	August 8, 2024	Olympic Games	Paris, France		
3000 m steeplechase	8:57.77	Courtney Frerichs	United States	August 21, 2021	Prefontaine Classic	Eugene, United States		
High jump	2.05 m (6 ft 8 1/2 in)	Chaunté Lowe	Nike	June 26, 2010	National Championships	Drake Stadium, Des Moines, United States		
Pole vault	5.00 m (16 ft 4 3/4 in)	Sandi Morris	Nike	September 9, 2016	Memorial Van Damme	Brussels, Belgium		
Long jump	7.49 m (24 ft 6 3/4 in) (+1.3 m/s)	Jackie Joyner-Kersee	adidas	May 22, 1994	Reebok New York Games	New York City, United States		
Long jump	7.49 m (24 ft 6 3/4 in) A (+1.7 m/s)	Jackie Joyner-Kersee	adidas	July 31, 1994		Sestriere, Italy		
Triple jump	14.92 m (48 ft 11 1/4 in) (Note: by World Athletics source; 14.91 m by USATF source) (+1.1 m/s)	Keturah Orji		April 25, 2021	Chula Vista HP #2	Chula Vista, United States		
Shot put	20.76 m (68 ft 1 1/4 in)	Chase Ealey	Nike	September 16, 2023	Prefontaine Classic	Eugene, United States		
Shot put	21.02 m (68 ft 11 1/2 in)	Chase Jackson	Nike	30 August 2026	2026 ISTAF	Berlin, Germany		
Shot put	21.14 m (69 ft 4 1/4 in)	Chase Jackson	Nike	4 September 2026	Memorial Van Damme	Brussels, Belgium		
Discus throw	71.46 m (234 ft 5 in)	Valarie Allman	Asics / New York Athletic Club	April 8, 2022	Tritons Invitational	La Jolla, United States		
Discus throw	73.52 m (241 ft 2 in)	Valarie Allman	Asics / New York Athletic Club	April 12, 2025	Oklahoma Throws Series	Ramona, United States		
Hammer throw	80.31 m (263 ft 5 in)	DeAnna Price	Nike	June 26, 2021	US Olympic Trials	Eugene, United States		
Javelin throw	68.11 m (223 ft 5 in)	Kara Winger	Tracksmith	September 2, 2022	Memorial Van Damme	Brussels, Belgium		
Heptathlon	7291 pts	Jackie Joyner-Kersee	World Class AC	September 23–24, 1988	Olympic Games	Seoul, South Korea		
Heptathlon	100m H (wind) / High jump / Shot put / 200m (wind) / Long jump (wind) / Javelin / 800m; 12.69 (+0.8 m/s) / 1.86 m (6 ft 1 in) / 15.80 m (51 ft 10 in) / 22.56 (+1.6 m/s) / 7.27 m (23 ft 10 in) (+0.7 m/s) / 45.66 m (149 ft 9 1/2 in) / 2:08.51; [4264 first day], [3027 second day]							
20 km walk (road)	1:30:49	Maria Michta		May 3, 2014	IAAF World Race Walking Cup	Taicang, China		
20 km walk (road)	1:30:49	Maria Michta-Coffey		March 20, 2016	Asian Race Walking Championships	Nomi, Japan		
4 × 100 m relay	40.82	Tianna Madison; Allyson Felix; Bianca Knight; Carmelita Jeter	United States	August 10, 2012	Olympic Games	London, United Kingdom		
4 × 400 m relay	3:15.27	Shamier Little; Sydney McLaughlin-Levrone; Gabrielle Thomas; Alexis Holmes	United States	August 10, 2024	Olympic Games	Paris, France		

==== Non-Olympic track and field events ====
Event	Record	Athlete	Team	Date	Meet	Place	Ref.	Video
150 m (bend)	16.10+ (+1.3 m/s)	Florence Griffith Joyner	World Class AC	September 29, 1988	Olympic Games	Seoul, South Korea		
150 m (bend)	16.41 (+1.1 m/s)	Brianna Rollins-McNeal		July 20, 2020	AP Ranch High-Performance Invitational	Fort Worth, United States		
150 m (straight)	16.30 (+0.1 m/s)	Tori Bowie	adidas	June 4, 2017	Boost Boston Games	Somerville, United States		
150 m (straight)	16.30 (±0.0 m/s)	Candace Hill	United States	18 May 2024	Atlanta City Games	Atlanta, United States		
200 m (straight)	22.31 (+0.9 m/s)	Joanna Atkins		May 20, 2018	adidas Boost Boston Games	Boston, United States		
300 m	35.46	Chandra Cheeseborough		August 18, 1984		London, United Kingdom		
600 m	1:22.39	Ajeé Wilson	adidas	August 27, 2017	ISTAF Berlin	Berlin, Germany		
1000 m	2:31.49	Addison Wiley	adidas	August 31, 2024	Mityng Ambasadorów Białostockiego i Podlaskiego Sportu	Białystok, Poland		
1000 m	2:30.71	Addison Wiley	adidas	July 11, 2025	Herculis	Fontvieille, Monaco		
Mile	4:16.35	Nikki Hiltz	Lululemon Athletica	July 21, 2023	Herculis	Fontvieille, Monaco		
Mile	4:16.32	Sinclaire Johnson	Nike	July 19, 2025	London Athletics Meet	London, United Kingdom		
2000 m	5:28.78	Cory McGee	New Balance	July 12, 2024	Herculis	Fontvieille, Monaco		
3000 m	8:25.10	Elise Cranny	Nike	August 22, 2024	Athletissima	Lausanne, Switzerland		
Two miles	9:11.97 Mx	Regina Jacobs	Mizuno	August 12, 1999	Los Gatos High School	Los Gatos, California, United States		
Two miles	9:16.78	Jenny Simpson	New Balance	April 27, 2018	Drake Relays	Des Moines, United States		
15,000 m	50:07.82+	Molly Huddle		November 1, 2020		Attleboro, United States		
10 miles	53:49.9+	Molly Huddle		November 1, 2020		Attleboro, United States		
One hour	17930 m	Molly Huddle		November 1, 2020		Attleboro, United States		
20,000 m	1:18:33 (Note: 1:18:37 by USATF statistic source, probably a typo)	Nikki Long	Raleigh Distance Project	April 1, 2021	Sir Walter Twilight	Raleigh, United States		
25,000 m	1:37:07	Caity Ashley	Raleigh Distance Project	April 1, 2021	Sir Walter Twilight	Raleigh, United States		
30,000 m	1:59:08	Gabi Séjourné	Raleigh Distance Project	April 1, 2021	Sir Walter Twilight	Raleigh, United States		
50 km	3:20:23	Ann Trason	Nike	March 18, 1995		Santa Rosa, United States		
50 miles	5:57:46 +	Camille Herron	COROS; Hoka One One	December 10, 2022	Desert Solstice Track Invitational	Phoenix, United States		
100 km	7:35:50 +	Camille Herron	COROS; Hoka One One	December 10, 2022	Desert Solstice Track Invitational	Phoenix, United States		
100 miles	12:52:50+	Camille Herron	COROS; Hoka One One	19 February 2023	Raven 24-Hour race	Mount Pleasant, United States		
12 hours	150.430 km+	Camille Herron	Nike	19 February 2023	Raven 24-Hour race	Mount Pleasant, United States		
200 km	17:07:27+	Camille Herron	Nike	December 9, 2018	Desert Solstice Track Invitational	Phoenix, United States		
24 hours	262.193 km	Camille Herron	Nike	December 9, 2018	Desert Solstice Track Invitational	Phoenix, United States		
200 m hurdles (straight)	24.91 (+0.1 m/s)	Shamier Little		May 23, 2021	Adidas Boost Boston Games	Boston, United States		
300 m hurdles	37.40	Anna Cockrell		May 8, 2026	Arkansas Twilight	Fayetteville, United States		
Mile steeplechase	4:46.74	Angelina Ellis		22 August 2025	Memorial Van Damme	Brussels, Belgium		
2000 m steeplechase	6:14.66	Stephanie Garcia		May 31, 2014		Greenville, United States		
Decathlon	7921 pts	Jordan Gray		22–23 June 2019		San Mateo, United States		
Decathlon	100m (wind) / Long jump (wind) / Shot put / High jump / 400m / 110m H (wind) / Discus / Pole vault / Javelin / 1500m							
Decathlon	8246 pts w	Jordan Gray		August 21–22, 2021	Decathlon Association Championship	San Mateo, United States		
Decathlon	100m (wind) / Long jump (wind) / Shot put / High jump / 400m / 100m H (wind) / Discus / Pole vault / Javelin / 1500m; 11.86 (+4.6 m/s)w / 6.12 m (20 ft 3/4 in) (+2.0 m/s) / 14.25 m (46 ft 9 in) / 1.71 m (5 ft 7 1/4 in) / 57.27 / 14.43 (−2.5 m/s) / 39.84 m (130 ft 8 1/2 in) / 3.91 m (12 ft 9 3/4 in) / 41.14 m (134 ft 11 1/2 in) / 5:20.27							
10,000 m walk	44:41.87	Michelle Rohl		July 26, 1994		Saint Petersburg, Russia		
10,000 m walk	44:06.0 #	Michelle Rohl		June 2, 1996		Kenosha, United States		
20,000 m walk	1:33:28.15	Teresa Vaill		June 25, 2005		Carson, United States		
25,000 m walk	2:12:09.2+	Katie Burnett		July 13, 2019	National Invitational Racewalks	San Diego, United States		
30,000 m walk	2:38:23.5+	Katie Burnett		July 13, 2019	National Invitational Racewalks	San Diego, United States		
35,000 m walk	3:04:47.1+	Katie Burnett		July 13, 2019	National Invitational Racewalks	San Diego, United States		
40,000 m walk	3:33:06.2+	Katie Burnett		July 13, 2019	National Invitational Racewalks	San Diego, United States		
50,000 m walk	4:29:45.56	Katie Burnett		July 13, 2019	National Invitational Racewalks	San Diego, United States		
4 × 200 m relay	1:27.46	LaTasha Jenkins; LaTasha Colander-Richardson; Nanceen Perry; Marion Jones	United States	April 29, 2000	Penn Relays	Philadelphia, United States		
Sprint medley relay (1,1,2,4)	1:35.20	Destinee Brown (100 m); Aaliyah Brown (100 m); Kimberlyn Duncan (200 m); Raevyn Rogers (400 m)	United States	April 28, 2018	Penn Relays	Philadelphia, Pennsylvania		
Sprint medley relay (2,2,4,8)	3:37.16	Rachelle Smith; Lauryn Williams; Monica Hargrove; Hazel Clark	United States Blue	April 29, 2006	Penn Relays	Philadelphia, Pennsylvania		
4 × 800 m relay	8:00.62	Chanelle Price; Maggie Vessey; Molly Beckwith-Ludlow; Alysia Johnson Montaño	United States	May 3, 2014	IAAF World Relays	Nassau, Bahamas		
Distance medley relay	10:36.50	Treniere Moser 3:18.38 (1200 m); Sanya Richards-Ross 50.12 (400 m); Ajeé Wilson 2:00.08 (800 m); Shannon Rowbury 4:27.92 (1600 m)	United States	May 2, 2015	IAAF World Relays	Nassau, Bahamas		
4 × 1500 m relay	16:27.02	Bowerman Track Club; Colleen Quigley; Elise Cranny; Karissa Schweizer; Shelby Houlihan	Nike	July 31, 2020	Portland Intrasquad Meeting	Portland, United States		
4 × 100 m hurdles relay	50.78	Nia Ali (12.73); Kristi Castlin (12.56); Yvette Lewis (12.76); Queen Harrison (12.61)	BoogieFast TC	April 6, 2013	Florida Relays	James G. Pressly Stadium, Gainesville, United States		

==== Non-Olympic road events ====
Event	Record	Athlete	Team	Date	Meet	Place	Ref.
Mile (road)	4:21.66 Wo	Sinclaire Johnson		13 December 2025	Kalakaua Merrie Mile	Honolulu, United States	
5 km	14:50	Molly Huddle	Saucony	April 18, 2015	BAA 5k	Boston, United States	
8 km	25:02	Lynn Jennings	Nike	May 12, 1991		Washington, D.C., United States	
8 km	24:45+ #	Shalane Flanagan	Nike	June 26, 2016	B.A.A. 10 km	Boston, United States	
8 km	24:36 Mx	Deena Kastor	Asics	April 3, 2005		Chicago, United States	
10 km	30:52 Mx	Shalane Flanagan	Nike	June 26, 2016	B.A.A. 10 km	Boston, United States	
10 km	30:52+ Mx	Weini Kelati	Nike	February 15, 2026	Barcelona Half Marathon	Barcelona, Spain	
10 km	31:09 Wo	Emily Venters	Nike	October 3, 2026	TC 10KM & USATF Road Running Championships	Minneapolis, United States	
12 km	37:50	Molly Huddle	Saucony	November 17, 2013	US National Road Racing Championships	Alexandria, United States	
15 km	46:29+ Mx	Weini Kelati	Nike	February 15, 2026	Barcelona Half Marathon	Barcelona, Spain	
15 km	47:10 + Wo	Emma Grace Hurley	United States	20 September 2026	World Road Running Championships	Copenhagen, Denmark	
15 km	47:10 + Wo	Weini Kelati Frezghi	United States	20 September 2026	World Road Running Championships	Copenhagen, Denmark	
10 miles	49:53 Wo	Taylor Roe	Puma	6 April 2025	USA 10 Mile Road Running Championships	Washington, United States	
10 miles	50:05+ Mx	Weini Kelati	Under Armour	January 19, 2025	Houston Half Marathon	Houston, United States	
20 km	1:02:31+ Mx	Weini Kelati	Nike	February 15, 2026	Barcelona Half Marathon	Barcelona, Spain	
20 km	1:02:53 + Wo	Emma Grace Hurley	United States	20 September 2026	World Road Running Championships	Copenhagen, Denmark	
Half marathon	1:06:04 Mx	Weini Kelati	Nike	February 15, 2026	Barcelona Half Marathon	Barcelona, Spain	
Half marathon	1:06:23 Wo	Emma Grace Hurley	United States	20 September 2026	World Road Running Championships	Copenhagen, Denmark	
25 km	1:22:09+ Mx	Emily Sisson		9 October 2022	Chicago Marathon	Chicago, United States	
25 km	1:21:57+ a	Deena Kastor	Asics	October 9, 2005	Chicago Marathon	Chicago, United States	
25 km	1:22:27 Wo	Carrie Ellwood	Asics	May 10, 2025	Amway River Bank Run (USA 25 km Open and Masters Championships)	Grand Rapids, United States	
30 km	1:39:08+ Mx	Deena Kastor	Asics	April 23, 2006	London Marathon	London, United Kingdom	
30 km	1:38:29+ a	Deena Kastor	Asics	October 9, 2005	Chicago Marathon	Chicago, United States	
50 km	2:59:54 Mx	Desiree Linden	Brooks	April 13, 2021	Brooks Running 50 km & Marathon	Dorena Lake, United States	
50 miles (road/trail)	5:18:57	Anne Flower		8 November 2025	Tunnel Hill 50 Mile	Vienna, United States	
100 km	7:00:48	Ann Trason	United States	September 16, 1995	IAU 100 km World Championships	Winschoten, Netherlands	
100 miles (road/trail)	12:19:34 Mx	Ashley Paulson		20 February 2026	Jackpot 100 Mile	Henderson, United States	
12 hours	146.221 km+	Camille Herron	United States	October 26–27, 2019	IAU 24 Hour World Championship	Albi, France	
200 km	17:13:21+	Camille Herron	United States	October 26–27, 2019	IAU 24 Hour World Championship	Albi, France	
24 hours	270.116 km	Camille Herron	United States	October 26–27, 2019	IAU 24 Hour World Championship	Albi, France	
48 hours	435.336 km	Camille Herron	United States	25–27 March 2023	Sri Chinmoy 48 Hour Festival	Bruce, Australia	
5 km walk	21:51	Maria Michta-Coffey		May 31, 2015	USA 5 km Race Walk Championships	Albany, United States	
10 km walk	44:09+	Maria Michta-Coffey		April 3, 2016	USA Racewalking Team Trials	Earth City, United States	
15 km walk	1:07:51+	Maria Michta		May 3, 2014	IAAF World Race Walking Cup	Taicang, China	
25 km walk	2:03:35+	Maria Michta-Coffey		November 6, 2016	USATF Race Walking Championships	Hauppauge, United States	
30 km walk	2:24:20+	Robyn Stevens		April 23, 2022	Dudinská Päťdesiatka	Dudince, Slovakia	
35 km walk	2:49:29	Robyn Stevens		23 April 2022	Dudinská Päťdesiatka	Dudince, Slovakia	
40 km walk	3:27:10+	Katie Burnett	United States	August 13, 2017	World Championships	London, United Kingdom	
50 km walk	4:21:51	Katie Burnett	United States	August 13, 2017	World Championships	London, United Kingdom	
Marathon road relay (Ekiden)	2:19:40	Carmen Ayala-Troncoso (16:22); Lori Hewig (33:42); Sammie Gdowski (16:12); Inge Schuurmans (33:42); Ceci St. Geme (15:59); Lucy Nusrala (23:43)	United States	April 16, 1994	World Road Relay Championships	Litochoro, Greece	

=== Mixed ===
Event	Record	Athlete	Team	Date	Meet	Place	Ref.
4 × 100 m relay	39.64	Ronnie Baker; Anavia Battle; Courtney Lindsey; Kayla White	United States	11 September 2026	World Athletics Ultimate Championship	Budapest, Hungary	
4 × 400 m relay	3:07.41	Vernon Norwood; Shamier Little; Bryce Deadmon; Kaylyn Brown	United States	2 August 2024	Olympic Games	Paris, France	

== Indoor ==
=== Men ===
Event	Record	Athlete	Team	Date	Meet	Place	Ref.	Video
50 m	5.56	Maurice Greene	Nike	February 13, 1999		Los Angeles, United States		
55 m	6.00	Lee McRae	Pitt	March 14, 1986		Oklahoma City, United States		
60 m	6.34 A	Christian Coleman	Nike	February 18, 2018	USA Championships	Albuquerque, United States		
200 m	20.02	Elijah Hall	Houston Cougars	March 10, 2018	NCAA Division I Championships	College Station, United States		
200 m	19.95	Garrett Kaalund	USC Trojans	March 14, 2026	NCAA Division I Championships	Fayetteville, United States		
300 m	31.87 A	Noah Lyles	Adidas	March 4, 2017	USA Championships	Albuquerque, United States		
400 m	44.52	Michael Norman	USC Trojans	March 10, 2018	NCAA Division I Championships	College Station, United States		
500 m	1:00.06	Brycen Spratling		February 14, 2015	Millrose Games	New York City, United States		
500 m	59.87	Brian Herron	Texas Longhorns	December 3, 2022	Commonwealth College Opener	Louisville, United States		
500 m	59.82	Roddie Haley		March 15, 1986	NCAA Division I Championships	Oklahoma City, United States		
600 y	1:05.75	Jenoah McKiver	Florida Gators	January 18, 2025	Corky Classic	Lubbock, United States		
600 m	1:13.77	Donavan Brazier	Nike Oregon Project	February 24, 2019	USA Championships	Staten Island, United States		
600 m	1:12.84	Josh Hoey	Adidas	December 6, 2025	BU Sharon Colyear-Danville Season Opener	Boston, United States		
800 m	1:43.24	Josh Hoey	Adidas	February 23, 2025	USA Championships	Staten Island, United States		
800 m	1:42.50	Josh Hoey	Adidas	January 24, 2026	New Balance Grand Prix	Boston, United States		
1000 m	2:14.48	Josh Hoey	Adidas-Fast 8 Track Club	January 18, 2025	Quaker Invitational	Philadelphia, United States		
1500 m	3:31.74+	Yared Nuguse	On Athletics Club	February 8, 2025	Millrose Games	New York City, United States		
1500 m	3:30.80+	Cole Hocker	Nike	February 14, 2026	ASICS Sound Invite	Winston-Salem, United States		
Mile	3:46.63	Yared Nuguse	On Athletics Club	February 8, 2025	Millrose Games	New York City, United States		
Mile	3:45.94	Cole Hocker	Nike	February 14, 2026	ASICS Sound Invite	Winston-Salem, United States		
2000 m	4:54.74	Bernard Lagat	Nike	February 15, 2014	Millrose Games	New York City, United States		
2000 m	4:48.79	Hobbs Kessler	Adidas	January 24, 2026	New Balance Indoor Grand Prix	Boston, United States		
3000 m	7:22.91	Grant Fisher		February 8, 2025	Millrose Games	New York City, United States		
Two miles	8:03.62	Grant Fisher		February 11, 2024	Millrose Games	New York City, United States		
5000 m	12:44.09	Grant Fisher		February 14, 2025	BU David Hemery Valentine Invitational	Boston, United States		
Marathon	2:17.59.4	CJ Albertson		April 13, 2019	The Armory Indoor Marathon	New York City, United States		
50 m hurdles	6.35	Greg Foster	World Class AC	January 27, 1985		Rosemont, United States		
50 m hurdles	6.35	Greg Foster	World Class AC	January 31, 1987		Ottawa, Canada		
50 m hurdles	6.30+	Grant Holloway		February 13, 2025	Meeting Hauts-de-France Pas-de-Calais	Liévin, France		
55 m hurdles	6.89	Renaldo Nehemiah	University of Maryland	January 20, 1979		New York City, United States		
60 m hurdles	7.27 A	Grant Holloway	Adidas	February 16, 2024	USA Championships	Albuquerque, United States		
400 m hurdles	49.78	Reuben McCoy		February 19, 2011	Aviva Indoor Grand Prix	Birmingham, United Kingdom		
High jump	7 ft 10 1/2 in / 2.40 m	Hollis Conway	Nike International	March 10, 1991	World Championships	Seville, Spain		
Pole vault	6.05 m	Christopher Nilsen	Nike	March 5, 2022	Perche Elite Tour	Rouen, France		
Long jump	28 ft 10 1/4 in / 8.79 m	Carl Lewis	Santa Monica Track Club	January 27, 1984	Millrose Games	New York City, United States		
Triple jump	58 ft 3 1/4 in / 17.76 m	Mike Conley	Tyson TC	February 27, 1987		New York City, United States		
Shot put	22.82 m	Ryan Crouser	Nike	January 24, 2021	American Track League Meeting 1	Fayetteville, United States		
Shot put	23.38 m A	Ryan Crouser	Nike	February 18, 2023	Simplot Games	Pocatello, United States		
Discus throw	62.50 m	Sam Mattis	Garage Strength	December 21, 2019	No Safe Throws Clinic and Competition	Youngstown, United States		
Weight throw	26.35 m A	Daniel Haugh	New York Athletic Club	16 February 2024	USA Championships	Albuquerque, United States		
Heptathlon	6645 pts	Ashton Eaton		March 9–10, 2012	World Championships	Istanbul, Turkey		
Heptathlon	60m / Long jump / Shot put / High jump / 60m H / Pole vault / 1000m; 6.79 / 8.16 m (26 ft 9 1/4 in) / 14.56 m (47 ft 9 in) / 2.03 m (6 ft 7 3/4 in) / 7.68 / 5.20 m (17 ft 1/2 in) / 2:32.77							
Mile walk	5:38.2	Tim Lewis	Reebok RC	January 30, 1987		Inglewood, United States		
3000 m walk	11:16.3	Ray Sharp	East Side TC	February 3, 1984		Louisville, United States		
2 miles walk	12:05.94	Jim Heiring	Bud Light	February 28, 1986		New York City, United States		
5000 m walk	19:15.88	Tim Seaman	New York Athletic Club	February 25, 2006	USA Championships	Boston, United States		
5000 m walk	19:13.37	Nick Christie	New York Athletic Club	February 28, 2026	USA Championships	Staten Island, United States		
10,000 m walk	44:36.0	John Knifton	New York Athletic Club	February 9, 1974		New London, United States		
4 × 200 m relay	1:22.71	Thomas Jefferson; Raymond Pierre; Antonio McKay; Kevin Little	United States	March 3, 1991		Glasgow, United Kingdom		
4 × 400 m relay	3:00.77	Zach Shinnick; Rai Benjamin; Ricky Morgan; Michael Norman	USC Trojans	March 10, 2018	NCAA Division I Championships	College Station, United States		
4 × 800 m relay	7:11.30	Hoka One One New Jersey*New York Track Club; Joe McAsey (1:48.78); Kyle Merber (1:47.84); Chris Giesting (1:47.35); Jesse Garn (1:47.14)	United States	February 25, 2018	BU Last Chance Meet	Boston, United States		
4 × 800 m relay	7:10.29	Clay Pender (1:49.69); Luke Houser (1:47.47); Luciano Fiore (1:47.35); Sean Dolan (1:45.79)	United States	February 6, 2026	Penn Classic	Philadelphia, United States		
Distance medley relay	9:18.81	Joe Waskom (2:51.34); Daniel Gaik (46.37); Nathan Green (1:46.57); Luke Houser (3:54.54)	University of Washington	February 16, 2024	Arkansas Qualifier	Fayetteville, United States		
4 × 1 mile relay (Note: recognised as 6000m event by USATF)	16:03.68	David Ribich (4:08.2); Henry Wynne (4:01.4); Brannon Kidder (3:56.8); Izaic Yorks (3:57.2)	Brooks	January 26, 2019	Dr. Sander Columbia Challenge	New York City, United States		

=== Women ===
Event	Record	Athlete	Team	Date	Meet	Place	Ref.	Video
50 m	6.02	Gail Devers	Nike	February 22, 1999	Meeting Pas de Calais	Liévin, France		
55 m	6.55 (Note: Converted from a time for the slightly shorter 60 yards by adding 0.01)	Evelyn Ashford	Med	February 26, 1982		New York City, United States		
55 m	6.55	Jeanette Bolden	World Class AC	February 21, 1986		Los Angeles, United States		
55 m	6.53+	Jacious Sears	Nike	February 8, 2025	Millrose Games	New York City, United States		
60 m	6.94 A	Aleia Hobbs	Adidas	February 18, 2023	USA Championships	Albuquerque, United States		
200 m	22.09	Abby Steiner	Kentucky Wildcats	February 26, 2022	Southeastern Conference Championships	College Station, United States		
300 m	35.54	Abby Steiner	Puma	February 11, 2023	Millrose Games	New York City, United States		
400 m	49.24	Isabella Whittaker	Arkansas Razorbacks	March 15, 2025	NCAA Division I Championships	Virginia Beach, United States		
500 m	1:07.34	Courtney Okolo	Nike	February 11, 2017	Millrose Games	New York City, United States		
600 y	1:16.76 A	Michaela Rose		January 20, 2024	Corky Classic	Lubbock, United States		
600 m	1:23.57	Athing Mu		February 24, 2019	USA Championships	Staten Island, United States		
800 m	1:58.29	Ajeé Wilson	adidas	February 8, 2020	Millrose Games	New York City, United States		
800 m	1:58.27 X	Ajeé Wilson	adidas	February 11, 2017	Millrose Games	New York City, United States		
800 m	1:57.97	Roisin Willis	New Balance	January 30, 2026	Boston University Terriers Classic	Boston, United States		
1000 m	2:34.19	Jen Toomey	Nike	February 20, 2004	Aviva Indoor Grand Prix	Birmingham, United Kingdom		
1500 m	3:59.60+	Heather MacLean	New Balance	March 2, 2025	Last Chance Indoor Qualifier	Boston, United States		
1500 m	3:59.33+	Elle St. Pierre	New Balance	February 14, 2026	BU David Hemery Valentine Invitational	Boston, United States		
Mile	4:16.41	Elinor Purrier	New Balance	February 11, 2024	Millrose Games	New York City, United States		
2000 m	5:34.52	Mary Slaney		January 18, 1985		Los Angeles, United States		
3000 m	8:20.87	Elle Purrier St. Pierre	United States	March 2, 2024	World Championships	Glasgow, United Kingdom		
Two miles	9:10.28	Elinor Purrier	United States	February 13, 2021	New Balance Indoor Grand Prix	Staten Island, United States		
Two miles	9:09.70	Alicia Monson	On Athletics Club	February 11, 2024	Millrose Games	New York City, United States		
5000 m	14:33.17	Elise Cranny	Bowerman Track Club; Nike	February 11, 2022	David Hemery Valentine Invitational	Boston, United States		
Marathon	2:40:55	Lindsey Scherf		March 17, 2018	The Armory Indoor Marathon	New York City, United States		
50 m hurdles	6.67 A	Jackie Joyner-Kersee	Honda	February 10, 1995		Reno, United States		
55 m hurdles	7.37	Jackie Joyner-Kersee	Honda	February 3, 1989		New York City, United States		
55 m hurdles	7.30 A (Note: mark set during pentathlon competition)	Tiffany Lott-Hogan		February 22, 1997 (Note: by World Athletics source; February 20, 1997 by Track and Field News & BYU Cougars sources)	WAC Indoor Championship	Colorado Springs, United States		
55 m hurdles	7.22+	Masai Russell	Nike	February 8, 2025	Millrose Games	New York City, United States		
60 m hurdles	7.67 A	Tia Jones	Adidas	February 16, 2024	USA Championships	Albuquerque, United States		
400 m hurdles	56.41	Sheena Tosta		February 12, 2011	Meeting National	Val-de-Reuil, France		
High jump	2.02 m (6 ft 7 1/2 in) A	Chaunté Lowe	Nike	February 26, 2012	USA Championships	Albuquerque, United States		
Pole vault	5.03 m (16 ft 6 in)	Jenn Suhr	Adidas	January 30, 2016	Golden Eagle Multi and Invitational	Brockport, United States		
Long jump	7.23 m (23 ft 8 1/2 in)	Brittney Reese	Nike	March 11, 2012	World Championships	Istanbul, Turkey		
Triple jump	15.12 m (49 ft 7 1/4 in) A	Jasmine Moore	Florida Gators	March 11, 2023	NCAA Division I Championships	Albuquerque, United States		
Shot put	20.24 m (66 ft 4 3/4 in)	Chase Jackson	Nike	February 16, 2025	Copernicus Cup	Toruń, Poland		
Shot put	20.44 m (67 ft 1/2 in)	Chase Jackson	Nike	February 28, 2026	USA Championships	Staten Island, United States		
Weight throw	26.02 m (85 ft 4 1/4 in)	DeAnna Price	New York Athletic Club / Nike	February 17, 2023	USA Championships	Albuquerque, United States		
Discus throw	55.03 m (180 ft 6 1/2 in)	Gia Lewis-Smallwood		March 12, 2011	World Indoor Throwing	Växjö, Sweden		
Pentathlon	5004 pts A	Anna Hall	Adidas	February 16, 2023	USA Championships	Albuquerque, United States		
Pentathlon	60m H / High jump / Shot put / Long jump / 800m; 8.04 / 1.91 m (6 ft 3 in) / 13.80 m (45 ft 3 1/4 in) / 6.34 m (20 ft 9 1/2 in) / 2:05.70							
1500 m walk	5:54.31	Debbi Lawrence	Parkside AC	January 10, 1992		Hamilton, Canada		
Mile walk	6:18:03	Debbi Lawrence	Parkside AC	February 15, 1992		Cleveland, United States		
3000 m walk	12:20.79	Debbi Lawrence	Natural Sport	March 12, 1993	World Championships	Toronto, Canada		
2 miles walk	13:37.02	Maria Michta-Coffey	Walk USA	March 1, 2015		Boston, United States		
4 × 200 m relay	1:32.67	Kyra Jefferson; Deajah Stevens; Daina Harper; Asha Ruth	United States	January 27, 2018	Dr. Norb Sander Invitational	New York City, United States		
4 × 400 m relay	3:23.85 (Note: by official result source; 3:23.84 by USATF source, probably a typo)	Quanera Hayes; Georganne Moline; Shakima Wimbley; Courtney Okolo	United States	March 4, 2018	World Championships	Birmingham, United Kingdom		
4 × 800 m relay	8:05.89	Chrishuna Williams; Raevyn Rogers; Charlene Lipsey; Ajeé Wilson	United States	February 3, 2018	Millrose Games	New York City, United States		
Distance medley relay	10:33.85	Heather MacLean 3:14.92 (1200m); Kendall Ellis 52.04 (400m); Roisin Willis 2:03.29 (800m); Elle Purrier St. Pierre 4:23.60 (1600m)	New Balance TC	April 15, 2022	Night at The Track	Boston, United States		

=== Mixed ===
Event	Record	Athlete	Date	Meet	Place	Ref.
4 × 400 m relay	3:21.35	United States; Jevon O'Bryant; Sara Reifenrath; Steven McElroy; Taiya Shelby	March 21, 2026	World Championships	Toruń, Poland	
