= List of Panamerican records in athletics =

Panamerican records in athletics are the best marks set in an athletics event by an athlete who competes for a member federation of the APA. APA doesn't maintain an official list for such performances. All bests shown on this list are tracked by statisticians not officially sanctioned by the governing body.

For these Athletes World Athletics maintain official Area Records, in this case North America, Central America, and Caribbean Records and South American Records.

== Outdoor ==
Key to tables: Not ratified or later rescinded by World Athletics, CONSUDATLE or NACAC

at = automatic timing

≠ = annulled by IAAF due to doping violation, but nevertheless ratified by USATF

=== Men ===
Event	Record	Athlete	Nationality	Date	Meet	Place	Ref.	Video
50 m	5.47+ (+0.9 m/s)	Usain Bolt	Jamaica	16 August 2009	World Championships	Berlin, Germany		
60 m	6.31+ (+0.9 m/s)	Usain Bolt	Jamaica	16 August 2009	World Championships	Berlin, Germany		
100 y	9.0 h	Ivory Crockett	United States	11 May 1974		Knoxville, United States		
100 y	9.0 h	Houston McTear	United States	9 May 1975		Winter Park, United States		
100 y	9.07+ (−0.5 m/s)	Asafa Powell	Jamaica	27 May 2010	Golden Spike Ostrava	Ostrava, Czech Republic		
100 m	9.58 (+0.9 m/s)	Usain Bolt	Jamaica	16 August 2009	World Championships	Berlin, Germany		
150 m (bend)	14.44+ (−0.3 m/s)	Usain Bolt	Jamaica	20 August 2009	World Championships	Berlin, Germany		
150 m (straight)	14.35 (+1.1 m/s)	Usain Bolt	Jamaica	17 May 2009	Manchester City Games	Manchester, United Kingdom		
200 m	19.19 (−0.3 m/s)	Usain Bolt	Jamaica	20 August 2009	World Championships	Berlin, Germany		
200 m (straight)	19.41 (−0.4 m/s)	Tyson Gay	United States	16 May 2010	Manchester City Games	Manchester, United Kingdom		
300 m	30.85 A	Michael Johnson	United States	24 March 2000	Engen Grand Prix	Pretoria, South Africa		
400 m	43.18	Michael Johnson	United States	26 August 1999	World Championships	Seville, Spain		
500 m	59.32	Orestes Rodriguez	Cuba	5 February 2013		La Habana, Cuba		
600 m	1:12.81	Johnny Gray	United States	24 May 1986		Santa Monica, United States		
800 m	1:41.20	Marco Arop	Canada	10 August 2024	Olympic Games	Saint-Denis, France		
1000 m	2:13.13	Marco Arop	Canada	8 September 2024	Hanžeković Memorial	Zagreb, Croatia		
1500 m	3:27.65	Cole Hocker	United States	6 August 2024	Olympic Games	Saint-Denis, France		
Mile	3:43.97	Yared Nuguse	United States	16 September 2023	Prefontaine Classic	Eugene, United States		
Mile (road)	3:51.9 h	Yared Nuguse	United States	1 September 2024	New Balance Kö Meile	Düsseldorf, Germany		
2000 m	4:51.54	Charles Philibert-Thiboutot	Canada	8 September 2023	Memorial van Damme	Brussels, Belgium		
3000 m	7:25.47	Grant Fisher	United States	17 September 2023	Prefontaine Classic	Eugene, United States		
Two miles	8:07.07	Matt Tegenkamp	United States	10 June 2007	Prefontaine Classic	Eugene, United States		
5000 m	12:45.27	Nico Young	United States	12 June 2025	Bislett Games	Oslo, Norway		
5 km (road)	13:14	Andrew Hunter	United States	19 September 2026	World Road Running Championships	Copenhagen, Denmark		
10,000 m	26:33.84	Grant Fisher	United States	6 March 2022	The Ten	San Juan Capistrano, United States		
10 km (road)	27:26	Conner Mantz	United States	2 August 2025	Beach to Beacon 10K	Cape Elizabeth, United States		
10 km (road)	27:23 a	Mark Nenow	United States	1 April 1984		New Orleans, United States		
15 km (road)	42:05+	Conner Mantz	United States	19 January 2025	Houston Half Marathon	Houston, United States		
10 miles (road)	45:16+	Conner Mantz	United States	19 January 2025	Houston Half Marathon	Houston, United States		
20,000 m (track)	56:55.6+ h	Arturo Barrios	Mexico	30 March 1991		La Fléche, France		
20 km (road)	56:16	Conner Mantz	United States	1 September 2025	USA 20 km Road Running Championships	New Haven, Connecticut, United States		
Half marathon	59:17	Conner Mantz	United States	19 January 2025	Houston Half Marathon	Houston, United States		
Half marathon	59:15a (Note: point-to-point course, not record eligible)	Conner Mantz	United States	16 March 2025	New York City Half Marathon	New York City, United States		
One hour	21101 m	Arturo Barrios	Mexico	30 March 1991		La Fléche, France		
25,000 m (track)	1:14:11.8+ h	Bill Rodgers	United States	21 February 1979		Saratoga, United States		
25 km (road)	1:12:17	Casey Clinger	United States	10 May 2025	Amway River Bank Run	Grand Rapids, United States		
30,000 m (track)	1:31:48.9	Bill Rodgers	United States	21 February 1979		Saratoga, United States		
30 km (road)	1:28:15+	Vincent Mauri	United States	11 October 2026	Chicago Marathon	Chicago, United States		
Marathon	2:04:43	Conner Mantz	United States	12 October 2025	Chicago Marathon	Chicago, United States		
Marathon	2:03:45 a (Note: downhill point-to-point course)	Zouhair Talbi	United States	20 April 2026	Boston Marathon	Boston, United States		
50 km (road)	2:38:43	CJ Albertson	United States	8 October 2022	Ruth Anderson Memorial Run 50k	San Francisco, United States		
50 miles (road)	4:48:21	Charlie Lawrence	United States	11 November 2023	Tunnel Hill 50 Mile	Vienna, United States		
100 km (road)	6:07:10 A	Charlie Lawrence	United States	20 December 2025	Desert Solstice Track Invitational	Boulder, United States		
100 miles	11:19:13+ (Note: counts as road event because of uncertified track)	Zach Bitter	United States	24−25 August 2019	Six Days in the Dome – The Redux 24h Day 2	Milwaukee, United States		
12-hour run	168.792 km (Note: counts as road event because of uncertified track)	Zach Bitter	United States	24−25 August 2019	Six Days in the Dome – The Redux 24h Day 2	Milwaukee, United States		
110 m hurdles	12.75 (+1.0 m/s)	Ja'Kobe Tharp	United States	10 June 2026	NCAA Division I Championships	Eugene, United States		
200 m hurdles (straight)	21.85 (+1.5 m/s)	Alison dos Santos	Brazil	17 May 2025	Adidas Games	Atlanta, United States		
300 m hurdles	33.22	Rai Benjamin	United States	12 June 2025	Bislett Games	Oslo, Norway		
400 m hurdles	46.17	Rai Benjamin	United States	3 August 2021	Olympic Games	Tokyo, Japan		
440 y Hurdles	48.7	Jim Bolding	United States	25 July 1974		Turin, Italy		
2000 m steeplechase	5:19.68	Duncan Hamilton	United States	3 September 2024	Copenhagen Athletics Games	Copenhagen, Denmark		
3000 m steeplechase	8:00.45	Evan Jager	United States	4 July 2015	Meeting Areva	Saint-Denis, France		
High jump	2.45 m	Javier Sotomayor	Cuba	27 July 1993		Salamanca, Spain		
Pole vault	6.07 m	KC Lightfoot	United States	2 June 2023	Music City Distance Carnival	Nashville, United States		
Long jump	8.95 m (+0.3 m/s)	Mike Powell	United States	30 August 1991	World Championships	Tokyo, Japan		
Triple jump	18.21 m (+0.2 m/s)	Christian Taylor	United States	27 August 2015	World Championships	Beijing, China		
Shot put	23.56 m	Ryan Crouser	United States	27 May 2023	USATF Los Angeles Grand Prix	Westwood, United States		
Discus throw	72.45 m	Sam Mattis	United States	9 April 2026	Oklahoma Throws Series World Invitational	Ramona, United States		
Hammer throw	84.70 m	Ethan Katzberg	Canada	16 September 2025	World Championships	Tokyo, Japan		
Javelin throw	93.07 m	Anderson Peters	Grenada	13 May 2022	Doha Diamond League	Doha, Qatar		
Decathlon	9045 pts	Ashton Eaton	United States	28–29 August 2015	World Championships	Beijing, China		
Decathlon	100m (wind) / Long jump (wind) / Shot put / High jump / 400m / 110m H (wind) / Discus / Pole vault / Javelin / 1500m; 10.23 (−0.4 m/s) / 7.88 m (±0.0 m/s) / 14.52 m / 2.01 m / 45.00 / 13.69 (−0.2 m/s) / 43.34 m / 5.20 m / 63.63 m / 4:17.52							
3000 m walk (track)	11:14.01	Eder Sánchez	Mexico	4 July 2009	Cork City Sports	Cork, Ireland		
5000 m walk (track)	18:33.68	Evan Dunfee	Canada	2 June 2024	Jesse Bent Invitational	Coquitlam, Canada		
10,000 m walk (track)	38:08.50	Evan Dunfee	Canada	27 January 2025	Supernova	Canberra, Australia		
10 km walk (road)	38:10	Luis Fernando López	Colombia	18 September 2010	IAAF World Race Walking Challenge Final	Beijing, China		
15 km walk (road)	59:11+	Iñaki Gómez	Canada	20 March 2016	Asian Race Walking Championships	Nomi, Japan		
20,000 m walk (track)	1:17:25.6 h	Bernardo Segura	Mexico	7 May 1994		Bergen, Norway		
20 km walk (road)	1:17:21	Jefferson Pérez	Ecuador	23 August 2003		St. Denis France		
30 km walk (road)	2:04:16+	Evan Dunfee	Canada	24 July 2022	World Championships	Eugene, United States		
35 km walk (road)	2:25:02	Evan Dunfee	Canada	24 July 2022	World Championships	Eugene, United States		
50 km walk (road)	3:41:09	Erick Barrondo	Guatemala	23 March 2013	Dudinska 50-ka	Dudince, Slovakia		
4 × 100 m relay	36.84	Nesta Carter; Michael Frater; Yohan Blake; Usain Bolt	Jamaica	11 August 2012	Olympic Games	London, United Kingdom		
4 × 200 m relay	1:18.63	Nickel Ashmeade; Warren Weir; Jermaine Brown; Yohan Blake	Jamaica	24 May 2014	IAAF World Relays	Nassau, Bahamas		
Swedish relay	1:46.59	Puma Reggae Team; Christopher Williams (100 m); Usain Bolt (200 m); Davian Clarke (300 m); Jermaine Gonzales (400 m)	Jamaica	25 July 2006	DN Galan	Stockholm, Stockholm		
4 × 400 m relay	2:54.29	Andrew Valmon; Quincy Watts; Butch Reynolds; Michael Johnson	United States	22 August 1993	World Championships	Stuttgart, Germany		
4 × 400 m relay	2:54.20 X	Jerome Young; Antonio Pettigrew; Tyree Washington; Michael Johnson	United States	22 July 1998	Goodwill Games	Uniondale, United States		
Sprint medley relay (2,2,4,8)	3:10.76	Carl Lewis; Ferran Tyler; Benny Hollis; Johnny Gray	United States	6 April 1985		Tempe, United States		
4 × 800 m relay	7:02.82	Jebreh Harris 1:47.05; Khadevis Robinson 1:44.03; Sam Burley 1:46.05; David Krummenacker 1:45.69	United States	25 August 2006	Memorial Van Damme	Brussels, Belgium		
Distance medley relay	9:14.58	Brooks Beasts; Brannon Kidder (2:49.60); Brandon Miller (46.60); Isaiah Harris (1:45.75); Henry Wynne (3:52.64)	United States	19 April 2024	Oregon Relays	Eugene, United States		
4 × 1500 m relay	14:34.97	Nike/Bowerman Track Club B Evan Jager; Grant Fisher; Sean McGorty; Lopez Lomong	United States	31 July 2020	Portland Intrasquad Meeting	Portland, United States		
Marathon road relay (Ekiden)	1:59:08	Ryan Hall (13:22); Matt Gonzales (28:15); Ian Dobson (13:46); Brian Sell (28:28); Fernando Cabada (14:11); Josh Moen (21:06)	United States	23 November 2005	International Chiba Ekiden	Chiba, Japan		

=== Women ===
Event	Record	Athlete	Nationality	Date	Meet	Place	Ref.
100 y	9.91+ (+1.1 m/s) ^{[WB]}	Veronica Campbell-Brown	Jamaica	31 May 2011	Golden Spike Ostrava	Ostrava, Czech Republic	
100 m	10.49 (±0.0 m/s)	Florence Griffith Joyner	United States	16 July 1988	US Olympic Trials	Indianapolis, United States	
150 m (bend)	16.09+ (+0.2 m/s)	Shericka Jackson	Jamaica	8 September 2023	Memorial van Damme	Brussels, Belgium	
150 m (bend)	16.41 (+1.1 m/s)	Brianna Rollins-McNeal	United States	20 July 2020	AP Ranch High-Performance Invitational	Fort Worth, United States	
150 m (straight)	16.23 (−0.7 m/s)	Shaunae Miller-Uibo	Bahamas	20 May 2018	Adidas Boost Boston Games	Boston, United States	
200 m	21.34 (+1.3 m/s)	Florence Griffith Joyner	United States	29 September 1988	Olympic Games	Seoul, South Korea	
200 m straight	21.76 (+0.5 m/s)	Shaunae Miller-Uibo	Bahamas	4 June 2017	Boost Boston Games	Somerville, United States	
300 m	34.41 ^{[WB]}	Shaunae Miller-Uibo	Bahamas	20 June 2019	Golden Spike Ostrava	Ostrava, Czech Republic	
400 m	47.78	Sydney McLaughlin-Levrone	United States	18 September 2025	World Championships	Tokyo, Japan	
600 m	1:22.39	Ajee' Wilson	United States	27 August 2017	ISTAF Berlin	Berlin, Germany	
800 m	1:54.44	Ana Fidelia Quirot	Cuba	9 September 1989		Barcelona, Spain	
1000 m	2:30.71	Addison Wiley	United States	11 July 2025	Herculis	Fontvieille, Monaco	
1500 m	3:54.99	Shelby Houlihan	United States	5 October 2019	World Championships	Doha, Qatar	
Mile (track)	4:16.32	Sinclaire Johnson	United States	19 July 2025	London Athletics Meet	London, United Kingdom	
Mile (road)	4:21.66 Wo	Sinclaire Johnson	United States	13 December 2025	Kalakaua Merrie Mile	Honolulu, United States	
2000 m	5:28.78	Cory McGee	United States	12 July 2024	Herculis	Fontvieille, Monaco	
3000 m	8:25.10	Elise Cranny	United States	22 August 2024	Athletissima	Lausanne, Switzerland	
Two miles	9:16.78	Jenny Simpson	United States	27 April 2018	Drake Relays	Des Moines, United States	
Two miles	9:11.97 Mx	Regina Jacobs	United States	12 August 1999		Los Gatos, United States	
5000 m	14:19.45	Alicia Monson	United States	23 July 2023	Anniversary Games	London, United Kingdom	
5 km (road)	14:50	Molly Huddle	United States	18 April 2015	BAA 5k	Boston, United States	
10,000 m	30:03.82	Alicia Monson	United States	4 March 2023	Sound Running TEN	San Juan Capistrano, United States	
10 km (road)	30:52 Mx	Shalane Flanagan	United States	26 June 2016	B.A.A. 10K	Boston, United States	
10 km (road)	30:52+ Mx	Weini Kelati	United States	15 February 2026	Barcelona Half Marathon	Barcelona, Spain	
10 km (road)	31:09 Wo	Emily Venters	United States	3 October 2026	TC 10KM & USATF Road Running Championships	Minneapolis, United States	
15,000 m	50:07.82+	Molly Huddle	United States	1 November 2020		Attleboro, United States	
15 km (road)	46:29+ Mx	Weini Kelati	United States	15 February 2026	Barcelona Half Marathon	Barcelona, Spain	
10 miles (track)	53:49.9+	Molly Huddle	United States	1 November 2020		Attleboro, United States	
10 miles (road)	49:53 Wo	Taylor Roe	United States	6 April 2025	Cherry Blossom Ten Mile Run	Washington, United States	
10 miles (road)	50:05+ Mx	Weini Kelati	United States	19 January 2025	Houston Half Marathon	Houston, United States	
20,000 m	1:18:33	Nikki Long	United States	1 April 2021	Sir Walter Twilight	Raleigh, United States	
20 km (road)	1:02:31+ Mx	Weini Kelati	United States	15 February 2026	Barcelona Half Marathon	Barcelona, Spain	
Half marathon	1:06:04 Mx	Weini Kelati	United States	15 February 2026	Barcelona Half Marathon	Barcelona, Spain	
25,000 m	1:37:07	Caity Ashley	United States	1 April 2021	Sir Walter Twilight	Raleigh, United States	
25 km (road)	1:21:57+ a	Deena Kastor	United States	9 October 2005	Chicago Marathon	Chicago, United States	
25 km (road)	1:22:09+ Mx	Emily Sisson	United States	9 October 2022	Chicago Marathon	Chicago, United States	
25 km (road)	1:22:27 Wo	Carrie Ellwood	United States	10 May 2025	Amway River Bank Run	Grand Rapids, United States	
30,000 m	1:59:08	Gabi Séjourné	United States	1 April 2021	Sir Walter Twilight	Raleigh, United States	
30 km (road)	1:38:29+ a	Deena Kastor	United States	9 October 2005	Chicago Marathon	Chicago, United States	
30 km (road)	1:39:08+	Deena Kastor	United States	23 April 2006	London Marathon	London, United Kingdom	
Marathon	2:18:29 Mx	Emily Sisson	United States	9 October 2022	Chicago Marathon	Chicago, United States	
Marathon	2:22:01 Wo	Sara Hall	United States	4 October 2020	London Marathon	London, United Kingdom	
50 km	2:59:54 Mx	Desiree Linden	United States	13 April 2021	Brooks Running 50 km & Marathon	Dorena Lake, United States	
50 miles (road/trail)	5:18:57	Anne Flower	United States	8 November 2025	Tunnel Hill 50 Mile	Vienna, United States	
100 km	7:00:48	Ann Trason	United States	16 September 1995		Winschoten, Netherlands	
100 miles (track)	12:52:50+	Camille Herron	United States	19 February 2023	Raven 24-Hour race	Mount Pleasant, United States	
100 miles (road)	12:19:34 Mx	Ashley Paulson	United States	20 February 2026	Jackpot 100 Mile	Henderson, United States	
12 hours (track)	150.430 km+	Camille Herron	United States	19 February 2023	Raven 24-Hour race	Mount Pleasant, United States	
24 hours (road)	270.116 km	Camille Herron	United States	26–27 October 2019	IAU 24 Hour World Championship	Albi, France	
48 hours (road)	435.336 km	Camille Herron	United States	25–27 March 2023	Sri Chinmoy 48 Hour Festival	Bruce, Australia	
100 m hurdles	12.09 (±0.0 m/s)	Masai Russell	United States	27 August 2026	Weltklasse Zürich	Zurich, Switzerland	
200 m hurdles (bend)	26.35 (−1.0 m/s)	Gianna Woodruff	Panama	13 March 2018 (Note: by Atletismo Sudamericano source; 10 March 2018 by World Athletics source)	Northridge CSUN All Comers	Northridge, United States	
200 m hurdles (straight)	24.86 (+0.1 m/s)	Shiann Salmon	Jamaica	23 May 2021	Adidas Boost Boston Games	Boston, United States	
300 m hurdles	37.40	Anna Cockrell	United States	8 May 2026	Arkansas Twilight	Fayetteville, United States	
400 m hurdles	50.37	Sydney McLaughlin-Levrone	United States	8 August 2024	Olympic Games	Paris, France	
Mile steeplechase	4:46.74	Angelina Ellis	United States	22 August 2025	Memorial Van Damme	Brussels, Belgium	
2000 m steeplechase	6:01.47	Tatiane Raquel da Silva	Brazil	18 June 2023	Czeslaw Cybulski Memorial	Poznań, Poland	
3000 m steeplechase	8:57.77	Courtney Frerichs	United States	21 August 2021	Prefontaine Classic	Eugene, United States	
High jump	2.05 m	Chaunté Lowe	United States	26 June 2010	National Championships	Des Moines, United States	
Pole vault	5.00 m	Sandi Morris	United States	9 September 2016	Memorial Van Damme	Brussels, Belgium	
Long jump	7.49 m (+1.3 m/s)	Jackie Joyner-Kersee	United States	22 May 1994		New York City, United States	
Long jump	7.49 m A (+1.7 m/s)	Jackie Joyner-Kersee	United States	31 July 1994		Sestriere, Italy	
Triple jump	15.41 m (+1.5 m/s)	Yulimar Rojas	Venezuela	6 September 2019	Memorial Francisco Ramón Higueras	Andújar, Spain	
Shot put	21.14 m	Chase Jackson	United States	4 September 2026	Memorial Van Damme	Brussels, Belgium	
Discus throw	73.52 m	Valarie Allman	United States	12 April 2025	Oklahoma Throws Series	Ramona, United States	
Hammer throw	80.51 m	Camryn Rogers	Canada	15 September 2025	World Championships	Tokyo, Japan	
Javelin throw	71.70 m	Osleidys Menéndez	Cuba	14 August 2005	World Championships	Helsinki, Finland	
Heptathlon	7291 pts	Jackie Joyner-Kersee	United States	24 September 1988	Olympic Games	Seoul, South Korea	
Heptathlon	100m H (wind) / High jump / Shot put / 200m (wind) / Long jump (wind) / Javelin / 800m; 12.69 (+0.8 m/s) / 1.86 m / 15.80 m / 22.56 (+1.6 m/s) / 7.27 m (+0.7 m/s) / 45.66 m / 2:08.51						
Decathlon	7921 pts	Jordan Gray	United States	22–23 June 2019		San Mateo, United States	
Decathlon	100m (wind) / Long jump (wind) / Shot put / High jump / 400m / 110m H (wind) / Discus / Pole vault / Javelin / 1500m						
3000 m walk (track)	12:39.62	Sara Stevenson	United States	25 May 2000	NAIA Championships	Abbotsford, Canada	
5000 m walk (track)	20:56.88	Michelle Rohl	United States	24 April 1996	Penn Relays	Philadelphia, United States	
5 km walk (road)	21:16	Glenda Morejón	Ecuador	15 April 2017	National Racewalking Championships	Sucúa, Ecuador	
10,000 m walk (track)	42:02.99	Sandra Arenas	Colombia	25 August 2018	Ibero-American Championships	Trujillo, Peru	
10 km walk (road)	42:42	Graciela Mendoza	Mexico	25 May 1997		Naumburg, Germany	
15 km walk (road)	1:05:14+	María Guadalupe González	Mexico	7 May 2016	World Race Walking Team Championships	Rome, Italy	
20,000 m walk (track)	1:30:52.0 h	Karla Jaramillo	Ecuador	25 May 2019	South American Championships	Lima, Peru	
20 km walk (road)	1:25:29	Glenda Morejón	Ecuador	8 June 2019	Gran Premio Cantones de Marcha	A Coruña, Spain	
25,000 m walk (track)	2:12:09.2+	Katie Burnett	United States	13 July 2019	National Invitational Racewalks	San Diego, United States	
25 km walk (road)	2:03:35+	Maria Michta-Coffey	United States	6 November 2016	USATF Race Walking Championships	Hauppauge, United States	
30,000 m walk (track)	2:38:23.5+	Katie Burnett	United States	13 July 2019	National Invitational Racewalks	San Diego, United States	
30 km walk (road)	2:24:33	Paola Pérez	Ecuador	22 October 2017		Hauppauge, United States	
35,000 m walk (track)	3:04:47.1+	Katie Burnett	United States	13 July 2019	National Invitational Racewalks	San Diego, United States	
35 km walk (road)	2:43:19	Kimberly García	Peru	23 April 2022	Dudinská Päťdesiatka	Dudince, Slovakia	
40,000 m walk (track)	3:33:06.2+	Katie Burnett	United States	13 July 2019	National Invitational Racewalks	San Diego, United States	
50,000 m walk (track)	4:29:45.56	Katie Burnett	United States	13 July 2019	National Invitational Racewalks	San Diego, United States	
50 km walk (road)	4:11:12	Johana Ordóñez	Ecuador	11 August 2019	Pan American Games	Lima, Peru	
4 × 100 m relay	40.82	Tianna Madison; Allyson Felix; Bianca Knight; Carmelita Jeter	United States	10 August 2012	Olympic Games	London, United Kingdom	
4 × 200 m relay	1:27.46	Team USA "Blue"; LaTasha Jenkins; LaTasha Colander; Nanceen Perry; Marion Jones	United States	29 April 2000	Penn Relays	Philadelphia, United States	
Sprint medley relay (1,1,2,4)	1:35.20	Destinee Brown (100 m); Aaliyah Brown (100 m); Kimberlyn Duncan (200 m); Raevyn Rogers (400 m)	United States	28 April 2018	Penn Relays	Philadelphia, United States	
Swedish relay	2:03.42	Christania Williams (100 m); Shericka Jackson (200 m); Olivia James (300 m); Chrisann Gordon (400 m)	Jamaica	10 July 2011		Lille, France	
4 × 400 m relay	3:15.27	Shamier Little; Sydney McLaughlin-Levrone; Gabrielle Thomas; Alexis Holmes	United States	10 August 2024	Olympic Games	Paris, France	
Sprint medley relay (2,2,4,8)	3:34.56	Sherri-Ann Brooks (200 m); Rosemarie Whyte(200 m); Moya Thompson 51.7 (400 m); Kenia Sinclair 1:57.43 (800 m)	Jamaica	April 2009	Penn Relays	Philadelphia, United States	
4 × 800 m relay	8:00.62	Chanelle Price; Maggie Vessey; Molly Beckwith-Ludlow; Alysia Johnson Montaño	United States	3 May 2015	IAAF World Relays	Nassau, Bahamas	
Distance medley relay	10:36.50	Treniere Moser 3:18.38 (1200 m); Sanya Richards-Ross 50.12 (400 m); Ajee' Wilson 2:00.08 (800 m); Shannon Rowbury 4:27.92 (1600 m)	United States	2 May 2015	IAAF World Relays	Nassau, Bahamas	
4 × 1500 m relay	16:27.02	Nike/Bowerman Track Club; Colleen Quigley; Elise Cranny; Karissa Schweizer; Shelby Houlihan	United States	31 July 2020	Portland Intrasquad Meeting	Portland, United States	
4 × 100 m Hurdles relay	50.50	USA Blue; Brianna Rollins; Dawn Harper-Nelson; Queen Harrison; Kristi Castlin	United States	24 April 2015	Drake Relays	Des Moines, United States	
Marathon road relay (Ekiden)	2:19:40	Carmen Ayala-Troncoso (16:22); Lori Hewig (33:42); Sammie Gdowski (16:12); Inge Schuurmans (33:42); Ceci St. Geme (15:59); Lucy Nusrala (23:43)	United States	16 April 1994	World Road Relay Championships	Litochoro, Greece	

=== Mixed ===
Event	Record	Athlete	Nationality	Date	Meet	Place	Ref.
4 × 100 m relay	39.62	Ackeem Blake; Tina Clayton; Kadrian Goldson; Tia Clayton	Jamaica	3 May 2026	World Relays	Gaborone, Botswana	
4 × 400 m relay	3:07.41	Vernon Norwood; Shamier Little; Bryce Deadmon; Kaylyn Brown	United States	2 August 2024	Olympic Games	Paris, France	

== Indoor ==
=== Men ===
Event	Record	Athlete	Nationality	Date	Meet	Place	Ref.
50 m	5.56 A	Donovan Bailey	Canada	9 February 1996	Bill Cosby Invitational	Reno, United States	
50 m	5.56 #	Maurice Greene	United States	13 February 1999		Los Angeles, United States	
50 m	5.55 X	Ben Johnson	Canada	31 January 1987		Ottawa, Canada	
55 m	5.99 A ^{[WB]}	Obadele Thompson	Barbados	22 February 1997		Colorado Springs, United States	
60 m	6.34 A	Christian Coleman	United States	18 February 2018	USA Championships	Albuquerque, United States	
150 m	14.99	Donovan Bailey	Canada	1 June 1997	Bailey–Johnson 150-metre race	Toronto, Ontario, Canada	
200 m	19.95	Garrett Kaalund	United States	14 March 2026	NCAA Division I Championships	Fayetteville, United States	
300 m	31.56	Steven Gardiner	Bahamas	28 January 2022	South Carolina Invitational	Columbia, United States	
400 m	44.49 (Note: Starting blocks did not comply with World Athletics regulations, athlete passed drug test on the day)	Christopher Morales Williams	Canada	24 February 2024	SEC Championships	Fayetteville, United States	
500 m	59.82	Roddie Haley	United States	15 March 1986	NCAA Division I Championships	Oklahoma City, United States	
600 y	1:05.75	Jenoah McKiver	United States	18 January 2025	Corky Classic	Lubbock, United States	
600 m	1:12.84	Josh Hoey	United States	6 December 2025	BU Sharon Colyear-Danville Season Opener	Boston, United States	
800 m	1:42.50	Josh Hoey	United States	24 January 2026	New Balance Grand Prix	Boston, United States	
1000 m	2:14.48	Josh Hoey	United States	18 January 2025	Quaker Invitational	Philadelphia, United States	
1500 m	3:30.80+	Cole Hocker	United States	14 February 2026	Asics Sound Invite	Winston-Salem, United States	
Mile	3:45.94	Cole Hocker	United States	14 February 2026	Asics Sound Invite	Winston-Salem, United States	
2000 m	4:48.79	Hobbs Kessler	United States	24 January 2026	New Balance Indoor Grand Prix	Boston, United States	
3000 m	7:28.24	Yared Nuguse	United States	27 January 2023	John Thomas Terrier Classic	Boston, United States	
Two miles	8:03.62	Grant Fisher	United States	11 February 2024	Millrose Games	New York City, United States	
5000 m	12:44.09	Grant Fisher	United States	14 February 2025	BU David Hemery Valentine Invitational	Boston, United States	
Marathon	2:17.59.4	CJ Albertson	United States	13 April 2019	The Armory Indoor Marathon	New York City, United States	
50 m hurdles	6.25	Mark McKoy	Canada	5 March 1986		Kobe, Japan	
55 m hurdles	6.89	Renaldo Nehemiah	United States	20 January 1979		New York City, United States	
60 m hurdles	7.27 A	Grant Holloway	United States	16 February 2024	USA Championships	Albuquerque, United States	
300 m hurdles	36.02 OT	Dinsdale Morgan	Jamaica	4 February 1998	Pirkkahall	Tampere, Finland	
400 m hurdles	48.78	Felix Sánchez	Dominican Republic	18 February 2012	Meeting National	Val-de-Reuil, France	
High jump	2.43 m	Javier Sotomayor	Cuba	4 March 1989	World Championships	Budapest, Hungary	
Pole vault	6.05 m	Chris Nilsen	United States	5 March 2022	Perche Elite Tour	Rouen, France	
Long jump	8.79 m	Carl Lewis	United States	27 January 1984	Millrose Games	New York City, United States	
Triple jump	17.83 m	Aliecer Urrutia	Cuba	1 March 1997		Sindelfingen, Germany	
Shot put	23.38 m A	Ryan Crouser	United States	18 February 2023	Simplot Games	Pocatello, United States	
Weight throw	26.35 m A	Daniel Haugh	United States	16 February 2024	USA Championships	Albuquerque, United States	
Discus throw	63.40 m	Fedrick Dacres	Jamaica	13 February 2016	ISTAF Indoor	Berlin, Germany	
Heptathlon	6645 pts	Ashton Eaton	United States	9–10 March 2012	World Championships	Istanbul, Turkey	
Heptathlon	60m / Long jump / Shot put / High jump / 60m H / Pole vault / 1000m; 6.79 / 8.16 m / 14.56 m / 2.03 m / 7.68 / 5.20 m / 2:32.77						
Mile walk	5:24.50	Ever Palma	Mexico	8 February 2025	USA 1 Mile Race Walking Championships	New York City, United States	
3000 m walk	11:16.3 h	Ray Sharp	United States	3 February 1984	Mason-Dixon Games	Louisville, United States	
5000 m walk	18:38.71	Ernesto Canto	Mexico	7 March 1987	World Championships	Indianapolis, United States	
4 × 200 m relay	1:22.71	Thomas Jefferson; Raymond Pierre; Antonio McKay; Kevin Little	United States	3 March 1991		Glasgow, United Kingdom	
4 × 400 m relay	3:00.77	University of Southern California; Zach Shinnick (46.24); Rai Benjamin (44.35); Ricky Morgan Jr. (45.67); Michael Norman (44.52)	United States; Antigua and Barbuda; United States; United States	10 March 2018	NCAA Division I Championships	College Station, United States	
4 × 800 m relay	7:10.29	Clay Pender (1:49.69); Luke Houser (1:47.47); Luciano Fiore (1:47.35); Sean Dolan (1:45.79)	United States	6 February 2026	Penn Classic	Philadelphia, United States	
Distance medley relay	9:18.81	Washington Huskies; Joe Waskom (2:51.34); Daniel Gaik (46.37); Nathan Green (1:46.57); Luke Houser (3:54.54)	United States	16 February 2024	Arkansas Qualifier	Fayetteville, United States	
4 × mile relay	16:12.81	Hoka New Jersey-New York Track Club; Donn Cabral; Ford Palmer; Graham Crawford; Kyle Merber	United States	18 February 2017	Artie O’Connor College Invitational	New York City, United States	

=== Women ===
Event	Record	Athlete	Nationality	Date	Meet	Place	Ref.	Video
50 m	6.00	Merlene Ottey	Jamaica	4 February 1994		Moscow, Russia		
55 m	6.53+	Jacious Sears	United States	8 February 2025	Millrose Games	New York City, United States		
60 m	6.94 A	Aleia Hobbs	United States	18 February 2023	USA Championships	Albuquerque, United States		
200 m	21.87	Merlene Ottey	Jamaica	13 February 1993	Meeting Pas de Calais	Liévin, France		
300 m	35.45	Shaunae Miller-Uibo	Bahamas	3 February 2018	Millrose Games	New York City, United States		
400 m	49.24	Isabella Whittaker	United States	15 March 2025	NCAA Division I Championships	Virginia Beach, United States		
500 m	1:07.34	Courtney Okolo	United States	11 February 2017	Millrose Games	New York City, United States		
600 y	1:16.76 A	Michaela Rose	United States	20 January 2024	Corky Classic	Lubbock, United States		
600 m	1:23.57	Athing Mu	United States	24 February 2019	USA Championships	Staten Island, United States		
800 m	1:57.97	Roisin Willis	United States	30 January 2026	Boston University Terriers Classic	Boston, United States		
1000 m	2:33.75	Lucia Stafford	Canada	28 January 2023	John Thomas Terrier Classic	Boston, United States		
1500 m	3:59.33+	Elle St. Pierre	United States	14 February 2026	BU David Hemery Valentine Invitational	Boston, United States		
Mile	4:16.41	Elle Purrier	United States	11 February 2024	Millrose Games	New York City, United States		
2000 m	5:34.52	Mary Slaney	United States	18 January 1985		Los Angeles, United States		
3000 m	8:20.87	Elle St. Pierre	United States	2 March 2024	World Championships	Glasgow, United Kingdom		
Two miles	9:09.70	Alicia Monson	United States	11 February 2024	Millrose Games	New York City, United States		
5000 m	14:31.38	Gabriela DeBues-Stafford	Canada	11 February 2022	BU David Hemery Valentine Invitational	Boston, United States		
Marathon	2:40:55	Lindsey Scherf	United States	17 March 2018	The Armory Indoor Marathon	New York City, United States		
50 m hurdles	6.67 A	Jackie Joyner-Kersee	United States	10 February 1995		Reno, United States		
50 m hurdles	6.67+	Michelle Freeman	Jamaica	13 February 2000	Meeting Pas de Calais	Liévin, France		
55 m hurdles	7.22+	Masai Russell	United States	8 February 2025	Millrose Games	New York City, United States		
60 m hurdles	7.65	Devynne Charlton	Bahamas	3 March 2024	World Championships	Glasgow, United Kingdom		
60 m hurdles	7.65	Devynne Charlton	Bahamas	22 March 2026	World Championships	Toruń, Poland		
400 m hurdles	56.41	Sheena Tosta	United States	12 February 2011	Meeting National	Val-de-Reuil, France		
High jump	2.02 m A	Chaunté Lowe	United States	26 February 2012	USA Championships	Albuquerque, United States		
Pole vault	5.03 m	Jenn Suhr	United States	30 January 2016	Golden Eagle Multi and Invitational	Brockport, United States		
Long jump	7.23 m	Brittney Reese	United States	11 March 2012	World Championships	Istanbul, Turkey		
Triple jump	15.43 m	Yulimar Rojas	Venezuela	21 February 2020	Villa de Madrid Indoor Meeting	Madrid, Spain		
Shot put	20.68 m	Sarah Mitton	Canada	7 February 2025	Indoor Meeting Karlsruhe	Karlsruhe. Germany		
Weight throw	25.60 m A	Gwen Berry	United States	4 March 2017	USA Championships	Albuquerque, United States		
Weight throw	25.60 m	Janeah Stewart	United States	21 January 2023	Vanderbilt Invitational	Nashville, United States		
Discus throw	55.03 m	Gia Lewis Smallwood	United States	12 March 2011	World Indoor Throwing	Växjö, Sweden		
Pentathlon	5004 pts A	Anna Hall	United States	18 February 2023	USA Championships	Albuquerque, United States		
Pentathlon	60m H / High jump / Shot put / Long jump / 800m; 8.04 / 1.91 m / 13.80 m / 6.34 m / 2:05.70							
1500 m walk	5:54.31	Debbi Lawrence	United States	10 January 1992		Hamilton, Canada		
Mile walk	6:17:29	Rachel Seaman	Canada	15 February 2014	Millrose Games	New York City, United States		
3000 m walk	12:20.79	Debbi Lawrence	United States	12 March 1993	World Championships	Toronto, Canada		
4 × 200 m relay	1:32.67	Kyra Jefferson; Deajah Stevens; Daina Harper; Asha Ruth	United States	27 January 2018	Dr. Norb Sander Invitational	New York City, United States		
4 × 400 m relay	3:23.85	Quanera Hayes; Georganne Moline; Shakima Wimbley; Courtney Okolo	United States	4 March 2018	World Championships	Birmingham, United Kingdom		
4 × 800 m relay	8:05.89	Chrishuna Williams; Raevyn Rogers; Charlene Lipsey; Ajeé Wilson	United States	3 February 2018	Millrose Games	New York City, United States		
Distance medley relay	10:33.85	New Balance Team; Heather MacLean 3:14.92 (1200m); Kendall Ellis 52.04 (400m); Roisin Willis 2:03.30 (800m); Elle Purrier St. Pierre 4:23.55 (1600m)	United States	15 April 2022	Night at The Track	Boston, United States		
