= COROS Wearables Inc =

Chinese technology company

COROS Wearables Inc.
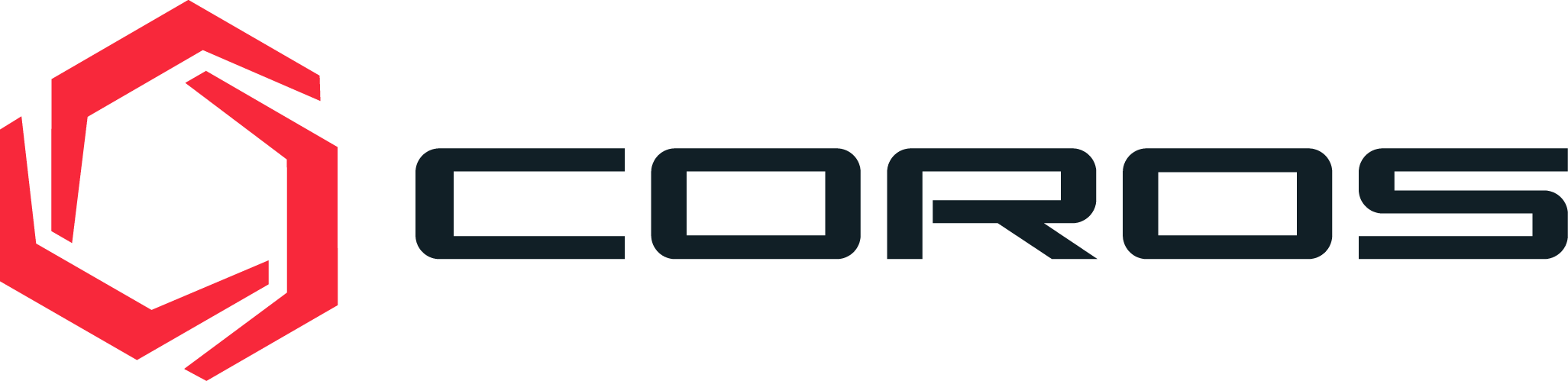
- Type: Private limited company
- Founded: 2014
- Headquarters: Irvine, California, USA (legal domicile); Dongguan, Guangdong Province, China (Operations)
- Area served: Worldwide
- Key people: Lewis Wu (CEO)
- Parent: Dongguan Yuanfeng Technology Co., Ltd (YF Tech)
- Website: www.coros.com

COROS Wearables Inc. is a multi-national company that designs and manufactures sports technology and wearables for outdoor and endurance athletes. Headquartered in Dongguan, China, the company employs over 400 people worldwide. Prior to the release of their first GPS sports watch, they previously produced an established range of smart bicycle helmets with safety design features for cyclists.

== History ==
COROS was founded in China in 2014. The company's first product was the LINX Smart Helmet, which released in 2016 and utilized open-ear bone conduction audio technology. The company followed with the OMNI smart helmet in 2017 and the SafeSound helmet in 2018.

The company ended production of smart helmets in 2019 and moved their focus to manufacturing multisport GPS watches. In May 2018, COROS launched its first GPS watch - The PACE Multisport GPS Watch. The watch featured a dedicated 'Track Mode' designed to improve pace and distance accuracy on running tracks, where standard GPS tracking had limitations. The PACE series has since had numerous installments:

- PACE 2 (2020) - Introduced a lightweight design, the lightest GPS watch at the time
- PACE 3 (2023) - Introduced a touchscreen display and Wi-Fi connectivity
- PACE Pro (2024) - Introduced an AMOLED screen
- PACE 4 (2025) - Introduced a microphone
- PACE 4 Aluminum (2026) - Introduced more durable materials

In October of 2018, the company launched its APEX line. This watch featured more durable materials than the PACE, and was marketed primarily to trail runners for its long battery life. It came in two sizes (42mm & 46mm). The APEX series has since been succeeded by the APEX Pro (2019), APEX 2 & 2 Pro (2022), and APEX 4 42mm & APEX 4 46mm (2025). The APEX 3 designation was skipped to align the numbering system with the PACE series.

In May of 2019, the company launched its flagship watch, the VERTIX. It was positioned as a premium offering due to the materials and expanded battery. It also expanded the company's range of sports to include climbing and mountaineering. The VERTIX series has since been succeeded by the VERTIX 2 (2021) and VERTIX 2S (2024).

In subsequent years, the company began to expand further into endurance sports outside of running. In April 2024, they announced a significant expansion of software for rock climbing. In July of 2024, the company launched its first cycling computer, the COROS DURA, which featured solar charging. In August of 2025, the company released the NOMAD adventure watch along with a new set of fishing features.

Beginning in 2020, COROS has also partnered with numerous professional athletes, including Eliud Kipchoge, Kilian Jornet, and Jakob Ingebrigtsen.

== Operations ==
COROS' main operations are within mainland China, primarily in Shenzhen and Dongguan. Its Research & Development, engineering, and manufacturing take place in Dongguan. The company's branches in North America, the United Kingdom, and Netherlands B.V (which serves the European Economic Area) are in charge of global marketing and product partnerships outside of mainland China.
