= 12-hour run =

Form of ultramarathon

A 12-hour run is a form of ultramarathon in which each competitor tries to run as far as possible in 12 hours. The event is typically held on 1 to 2 mi (1.6 to 3.2 km) loops, but sometimes is held on 400-metre (0.25 mi) tracks. Some races are held on trails and others are held on sidewalks in city parks. Top runners will often run 60 miles (97 km) or more (the best doing about 100 miles (160 km)), depending on conditions. Some participants will have a crew to help them, while others set up a camp with their equipment and supplies near the starting area, with good access from each loop.

== Records ==
World records of 12 hour
	Women			Men		
	Athlete	Distance (m)	Place	Athlete	Distance (m)	Place
Road	Satu Lipiäinen; Finland	153,600	Kokkola, Finland; 20 May 2023	Alexander Sorokin; Lithuania	177,410	Tel Aviv, Israel; 7 January 2022
Track	Camille Herron; United States	149,130	Phoenix United States; 9/10 December 2017	Zach Bitter; United States	163,785	Phoenix United States; 14 December 2013

== See also ==
- One hour run
- 24-hour run
