= Earth City, Missouri =

Earth City
- Unincorporated community
- Location within Missouri
- Coordinates: 38°46′08″N 90°28′05″W
- Country: United States
- State: Missouri
- County: St. Louis
- Elevation: 440 ft (130 m)

Population (2010)
  - Total: 0
- Time zone: UTC−6 (Central (CST))
  - Summer (DST): UTC−5 (CDT)
- ZIP Code: 63045
- Area code: 314
- GNIS feature ID: 756957

Earth City is an unincorporated commercial area located in St. Louis County, Missouri, United States, along Interstate 70, near the Missouri River. It is bounded by the city of Bridgeton on the east and north, the city of Maryland Heights to the south, and the Missouri River to the west. It is also near Lambert International Airport.
