= Anne Flower =

American doctor and ultrarunner

Anne Flower is an American doctor and ultrarunner who began running to handle the stresses of the medical profession. In 2020, she qualified for the Olympic Trials in the marathon but soon began running longer distances.

In 2024 she won the Javelina Jundred 100K and in 2025, she broke the 31-year-old course record in her first Leadville 100, a record that Ann Trason had held since 1994. In her final race of the year, she won the Tunnel Hill 50 in Vienna, Illinois and set the women's 50 miles world record in doing so.

Flower is a Cincinnati native and graduate of Ohio University and Regis University.
