= Ann Trason =

American ultramarathon runner

Ann Trason (born August 30, 1960) is an American ultramarathon runner from Auburn, California. She set 20 world records during her career. Her world record of 5:40:18 at the 50 mile distance, set in 1991, was unbeaten until 2015. As of her induction into the Ultrarunning Hall of Fame in 2020, she was considered by many to be the most successful female ultrarunner of all time.

== Life ==
Trason was a top runner in high school, but a knee injury kept her from competing in college and injuries plagued her throughout her running career including not finishing her first two entries to the Western States 100.

Trason's ultra career began when she entered the 1985 American River 50 Miler at age 24 and both won and set a course record. She returned 8 years later and dropped her time by an hour to establish the 6:09 female course record that still stands. Trason's Western States career began in 1987, but was not able to finish it until 1989 when she was first female finisher. She has won Western States 14 times, most recently in 2003. She held the women's course record for 18 years (17:37:51, set in 1994) until it was broken by Ellie Greenwood in 2012.

Trason appears in Christopher McDougall's accounts of the Leadville Trail 100 in the 1990s in his 2009 book, Born to Run: A Hidden Tribe, Superathletes, and the Greatest Race the World Has Never Seen. Her time of 18:06:24 in the 1994 Leadville was the women's course record until 2025.

In both 1996 and 1997 Trason performed the "double" of winning the Western States 100 just 12 days after winning the 56-mile Comrades Marathon in South Africa.

Trason and her ex-husband and training partner Carl Andersen co-directed the Dick Collins Firetrails 50 from 2000 through 2010. Trason set the female course record on the Firetrails 50 the one time she ran it, in 1987.

Trason broke twenty world records during her running career in distances from forty to one hundred miles.

After a decade away from running once her then-husband could no longer run, Trason returned to the sport as crew and an occasional racer in 2013. She was a multi-year UltraRunner of the Year, and in 2020, she was inducted into the American Ultrarunning Hall of Fame.

She completed 100 miles in the 2025-2026 Across the Years ultra using her walker.

== Course records ==
- 5:40:18 – Houston UltraMarathon 50 mile (1991)
- 6:09:08 – American River 50 mile (1993)
- 3:59:32 – Cool Canyon Crawl 50K (1993)
- 7:31:24 – Dick Collins Firetrails 50 mile (1987)
- 6:13:54 – Hunter Thompson 50 mile
- 18:06:24 – Leadville Trail 100 women's record (2nd place overall in 1994). This record stood until 2025 when Anne Flower broke it.
- 8:55:49 – Miwok 100K Trail Race (2001)
- 6:43:52 – Quicksilver 50 mile (1992)
- 7:29:36 – Silver State 50 mile (1994)
