= Angelina Ellis =

American middle-distance runner

Personal information
- Born: 9 August 1998 (age 28)

Sport
- Sport: Athletics
- Events: Middle-distance running, Steeplechase

Achievements and titles
- Personal bests: 1500m: 4:06.02 (Los Angeles, 2026); Mile: 4:26.69 (Boston, 2025); 3000m: 8:54.21 (Boston, 2025); 5000m: 15:33.83 (Boston, 2025); 3000m S'chase: 9:18.84 (New York, 2026); Road; Mile: 4:34.35 (Des Moines, 2026)

Angelina Ellis (born 9 August 1998) is an American steeplechaser and middle-distance runner.

== Biography ==
From Zionville, Indiana, Ellis attended Zionsville Community High School, graduating in 2017, and later studied at Butler University in Indianapolis. She was a hurdler until sixth grade when she transitioned to middle-distance running, and began to run steeplechase at University. She graduated in 2023 with a masters degree in business administration, and had a top-ten finish in the 3000 metres steeplechase at the 2023 NCAA Outdoor Championships and also ran cross country.

Competing as a professional for the Under Armour’s Mission Run Dark Sky Distance team, Ellis placed eleventh in the 3000 metres steeplechase at the 2024 US Olympic Trials, in a time of 9:28.19.

Ellis competed at the 2025 Memorial Van Damme in Brussels, part of the 2025 Diamond League in the inaugural Diamond League steeple mile, and placed second overall behind Winfred Yavi.

Ellis opened her 2026 outdoor season with a 9:29.06 for the 3000 m Steeplechase at the Drake Relays. In May, she ran a personal best 9:20.53 for a ninth place finish in the 3000 m steeplechase at the 2026 Shanghai Diamond League in China. On 4 July, Ellis ran a new personal best of 9:20.30 at the 2026 Prefontaine Classic. On 11 July, Ellis ran a 1500 m personal best of 4:06.02 at the Sound Running Sunset Tour. On 25 July, she placed fourth in the 3000 m steeplechase at the 2026 USA Outdoor Track and Field Championships in New York, running a personal best 9:18.84.
