= Ceci Hopp =

American track and field athlete(born 1963)

Personal information
- Born: 13 April 1963 (age 63) Greenwich, Connecticut, United States
- Height: 5’ 4”
- Weight: 110

Sport
- Sport: Track and field and Cross Country
- Event: 800, 1500, 3000, 5000
- Coached by: Brooks Johnson

Cecilia "Ceci" St. Geme (née Hopp; born 13 April 1963) is an American track and field athlete, specializing in middle to long distance running events. She holds the North American continental and American junior records in the 3000 meters, set June 27, 1982 in Durham, North Carolina. 1982 NCAA Champion 3000m She was the 1994 National Champion at 5000 meters.

An avid tennis player and ballerina, she took up running in 1979 while at Greenwich High School. She quickly emerged, winning the state championship at 800 meters her first year out. By 1980, she became the second ever Kinney National Cross Country Champion.

She earned a scholarship to Stanford University. During her freshman year, she set the still standing National Youth record for 1500 meters. There she was the 1982 NCAA Champion at 3000 meters. Later that year, she was the bronze medalist in the National Cross Country Championships, leading Stanford to second place in the team standings. She was inducted into the Stanford Athletic Hall of Fame in 2002, in the Greenwich High School Hall of Fame in 2015, along with the Fairfield County Sports Hall of Fame in 2011. At Stanford University, she won the 1982 NCAA Championship at 3000 meters. In 1986, she married Stanford free safety, Ed St. Geme. In 1994 she won the USATF 5000m in Knoxville, Tn.
