= Sean Dolan (runner) =

American middle-distance runner (born 2001)

Personal information
- Born: March 19, 2001 (age 25)

Sport
- Sport: Athletics
- Event: Middle-distance running
- Club: Atlanta Track Club (2024-present)

Achievements and titles
- Personal bests: 800 m: 1:45.41 (2026); 1500m: 3:38.60 (2021); Indoor; Mile 3:55.52 (2026); 800m: 1:45.41 (2026); 1500m: 3:40.74 (2026)
Medal record
Men's athletics
Representing United States
NACAC U-23 Championships
Silver medal – second place	2023 San Jose	800 meters

Sean Dolan (born March 19, 2001) is an American middle-distance runner. He was runner-up over 800 metres at the 2026 USA Indoor Championships.

== Early and personal life ==
Dolan is from a family of runners, his father Steve Dolan is the head track coach at the University of Pennsylvania, and his older brother Tim is also a runner. Dolan took part in a number of sports growing up, including soccer and basketball, before focusing on athletics. He attended at Hopewell Valley High School in New Jersey.

== Career ==
Dolan was the 2018 New Balance Nationals Outdoor champion in the mile run and won the New Jersey Meet of Champions in the 1600m with a time of 4:09.14 in 2019. Dolan went on to compete for Villanova University, and ran 3:57.20 to finish sixth in the final of the mile run at the 2021 NCAA Indoor Championships. That year, at the Joe Walker Invitational, Dolan secured a new personal best time of 3:38.60 for 1500 metres.

Dolan won the silver medal in the 800 metres at the 2023 NACAC U23 Championships in San Jose, Costa Rica. Dolan was runner-up to Rivaldo Marshall at the 2024 NCAA Indoor Championships over 800 metres in March 2024 in Boston. Running alongside Liam Murphy, Luke Rakowitz and Dan Watcke, he won the Distance Medley Relay for Villanova at the 2024 Penn Relays. He finished his collegiate career with Villanova in 2024, as a seven-time All-American.

Dolan joined the Atlanta Track Club Elite in 2024. In February 2026, Dolan ran the anchor leg for an Atlanta Track Club Elite team at the Penn Classic in the 4 × 800 metres relay to set a new indoor world record time of 7:10.29, breaking the previous mark set in 2018. His teammates for the run were Luke Houser, Clay Pender and Luciano Fiore. On 1 March 2026, he was second behind Cooper Lutkenhaus in the 800 metres at the 2026 USA Indoor Track and Field Championships. The following weekend, Dolan ran a new outright personal best for the 800 metres of 1:45.41 at the PRTC Indoor Classic. He was a semi-finalist representing the United States at the 2026 World Athletics Indoor Championships in Toruń, Poland, running 1:46.45 in his semi-final. In July, he won the 800 m in 1:45.76 at the Cork City Sports in Ireland. Dolan was a finalist over 800 metres at the 2026 USA Championships in New York in July.
