= Charles R. Lawrence =

American ultramarathon runner

Personal information
- Born: Charles R. Lawrence; March 24, 1995 (age 31) USA

Sport
- Country: United States
- Sport: Track and field
- Events: Marathon and ultramarathon

Achievements and titles
- Personal bests: Marathon: 2:16:10; 50 km: 3:09:11; 50 miles: 4:48:21; 100 km: 6:07:10

Charles R. "Charlie" Lawrence (born March 24, 1995) is an American ultramarathon and marathon runner. He set a 50-mile IAU World Record time of 4:48:21 at the 2023 Tunnel Hill 50 in Vienna, Illinois.

== Early life ==
Charlie Lawrence is the son of two cross country coaches. He was confident in his running potential from a young age. He said in an interview "I knew I was a runner in first grade. I watched a state cross-country meet and told my mom and dad, 'I want to win that, and I’m going to win that.'"

At Foley High School, he was a state champion in the 3,200-meter race and he set school records in the 800, 1,600 and 3,200.

Lawrence graduated from high school in 2013 and attended the University of Minnesota, where he got undergraduate degrees in Business and Sports Management and a Master's degree in Sports Management. He competed on the school's Cross Country and Track teams for five years.

== Distance running career ==
Seven months after graduating from the University of Minnesota, in December 2018, Lawrence finished 20th at the U.S. Championships. In January 2019, he signed a professional deal with Hansons-Brooks Running Club, and he trained for a year for the 2020 Olympic marathon trials. While training, he worked as a ticket sales and development coordinator at Oakland University in Southeast Michigan. He finished the 2020 marathon trials 61st, and he believes he had overtrained for the race. He left Hansons-Brooks Running Club and moved to Boulder, Colorado to train with a coach named Tom Schwartz. At the time, his only sponsor was a supplement company called Live Momentous.

Charlie Lawrence finished 61st in the United States Olympic Marathon Trials in February 2020. Lawrence became interested in setting the 50-mile race record in the fall of 2021. Earlier in 2021, he paced Des Linden in a 50K, where she broke the world record by more than seven minutes. He suffered a stress fracture in 2022, and he paused his training until February 2023.

On October 14, 2023, he set a personal best marathon time of 2:16:10 at the McKirdy Micro Marathon in New York, achieving a spot at the 2024 Olympic marathon trials.

The Tunnel Hill 50 was his first 50-mile race; previously, his longest race had been in the low 30s in terms of mileage. He planned to run in the 5:40 to 5:45 range for as long as he could hold on. During the race, he ran the first 24 miles at a faster pace than anticipated, below a 5:40 per mile pace. He slowed down before the 40-mile mark, with a mile pace between 5:50 and 6:00 per mile. Then, after passing through a 200-meter tunnel, the final ten miles had a slight decline. He paused for about ten seconds near mile 47 to stretch his legs, and he ran miles 48 and 49 at approximately a 6:30 pace. He finished the race with a final time of 4:48:21, average pace of 5:46 per mile.

His 50-mile ultramarathon record was ratified on January 16, 2024. He beat the previous record of 4:50:08, which was set by Jim Walmsley at the HOKA One Project Carbon X event in California, by almost two minutes.

On December 20, 2025, he broke the American record in 100 km, with a time of 6:07:10 at the Desert Solstice Track Invitational in Boulder, Colorado.

== Personal life ==
Charlie Lawrence moved to in Boulder, Colorado in 2020 for the altitude and the competitive athletic environment.
