= Sam Burley =

American middle-distance track athlete

Samuel Burley (born February 13, 1981, in St. Ignatius, Montana) is an American middle-distance track athlete. He currently holds the American record in the 4x800 m relay along with David Krummenacker, Jebreh Harris, and Khadevis Robinson. Their time, set in 2006, broke the previous world record.

Burley was a graduate of the University of Pennsylvania, where he was a three-time NCAA All-American, the 2003 NCAA national champion in the 800 m, and the 2002 Heptagonal Championships winner in the 1,500 m. After graduation, he competed in the 800 m distance in the 2003 World Outdoor Championships and was 7th at the Olympic Trials in 2004. Most recently, he finished 2nd in the 800 m at the 2007 USA Indoor Track & Field Championships held in Boston, Massachusetts.
