= Zach Bitter =

American ultramarathon runner

- Education: University of Wisconsin - Stevens Point
- Occupation: Ultramarathon Runner

Zach Bitter is an American ultramarathon runner. He held world records for the 100-mile run (track) and the 12-hour run (track). Bitter claimed both records with his performance during the Six Days in the Dome event in Milwaukee, Wisconsin, on August 24, 2019. His 100-mile time of 11 hours, 19 minutes and 13 seconds, bested Oleg Kharitonov's 2002 world record by almost 11 minutes, and was more than 20 minutes faster than his own American mark of 11:40:55. After claiming the 100-mile record, Bitter continued running for another 40 minutes and upped his own 12-hour distance world record to 104.8 miles, an improvement of more than three miles over the previous mark. His 12-hour record was beaten by Lithuanian Aleksandr Sorokin in January 2022.

Bitter attended the University of Wisconsin - Stevens Point from 2005 to 2008 and was a member of the Track and Field and Cross Country teams. During Zach Bitters's career at University of Wisconsin - Stevens Point, he was a top 5 runner on the men's cross-country team. At the UW-Oshkosh Cross Country Brooks Invitational in 2007, Bitter would run his collegiate 8k personal best of 26 minutes and 34 seconds. This time would earn him 149th place overall at the meet. And at the time, the 51st fastest time in University of Wisconsin- Stevens Point history. Zach Bitter also ran two years of Indoor and outdoor track and field at the University of Wisconsin-Stevens Point. Earning a personal best of 9 minutes and 23 seconds in the 3000-meter run at the Nike Impact Sports- Platteville meet on February 16, 2008.

"At UW-SP, I learned that I seemed to get better as the distances got longer, so to me, becoming an ultra runner was a logical progression," said Bitter in 2015.
