= Andrew Bumbalough =

American long-distance runner (born 1987)

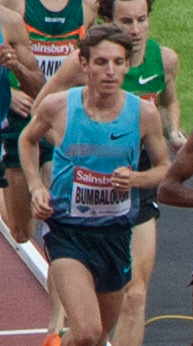
- Bumbalough in 2013

Personal information
- Nationality: American
- Born: March 14, 1987 (age 39) Brentwood, Tennessee

Sport
- Sport: Track, long-distance running
- Event(s): 1500 meters, 5000 meters, marathon
- College team: Georgetown
- Club: Bowerman Track Club

Achievements and titles
- Personal best(s): 1500m: 3:37.15; 5000m: 13:12.01; 10,000m: 27:56.78 ½ marathon: 1:02:04; Marathon: 2:10:56
- Updated on October 19, 2018

Andrew Bumbalough (born March 14, 1987) is a runner who specialized in various middle and long distances in track. He represented the United States at the 2011 IAAF World Cross Country Championships and at the 2014 IAAF Continental Cup. After graduating from Georgetown University, Bumbalough went to train in Oregon with Coach Schumacher and fellow athletes Tim Nelson, Matt Tegenkamp, Evan Jager and Chris Solinsky. In 2011, Bumbalough finished fourth in the 5000m at the USA Outdoor Track and Field Championships behind Bernard Lagat, Galen Rupp and teammate Chris Solinsky.

== Running career ==
=== High school ===
While running for Brentwood Academy in Brentwood, Tennessee, Bumbalough set men's state records in track and cross country, including the 3200 meter run in 2004 (8:46.47) and the 1600 meter run in 2005 (4:05.75).

=== Collegiate ===
Bumbalough went on to study and run at Georgetown University. There he accumulated a total of six All-American honors. At the 2008 NCAA DI Indoor T&F Championships, he placed second in the men's 3000 meters and anchored Georgetown's 5th-place DMR team.

=== Post-collegiate ===
At the 2011 KBC Night of Athletics, Bumbalough managed to run a 5000-meter race in 13:21 in 2011. It was the second fastest 5000 of his career by five seconds and placed him ahead of talented runners in Heusden's premier race in the northeast part of Belgium, home to one of the top non-Diamond League 5000m races in Europe. The following year, he ran a 13:16.26 in the 5000 meters at the 2012 Stanford Payton Jordan Invitational, Andrew Bumbalough reached the Olympic “A” standard.

At the 2014 USATF Indoor Championships, a huge controversy ensued when Bumbalough was disqualified due to a protest by Alberto Salazar, who claimed that Galen Rupp was fouled in the middle of the race. The IAAF rule book currently just says if a runner is “jostled or obstructed during an event so as to impede his progress” then the other runner “shall be liable to disqualification”. However, video of the race indicated the offending athlete was not Bumbalough. As the time for appeal had expired and there was no recourse for correction in the rulebook, so the disqualification stood. After almost an entire year, in December 2014 at USA Track and Field Annual meeting, Andrew was reinstated.

In July 2014, Bumbalough produced a quality showing in the 5000 meters at the US national championship, going up against four runners with PB's of 13:16 or better and beating all but one. Bumbalough made a late bid for the win with two laps to go, and hung on for a runner-up finish to perennial champion Bernard Lagat. The Tennessee-native posted a 13:32.01 in his bid for his first track national title, marking one of the quicker efforts in recent USATF 5000m races.

In May 2017 Bumbalough served as a pacer for Nike's Breaking2 attempt at achieving a sub-2-hour marathon time.

In April 2018, placed 5th at 2018 Boston Marathon in a time of 2:19:52.
