= Josh Thompson (runner) =

American middle-distance runner

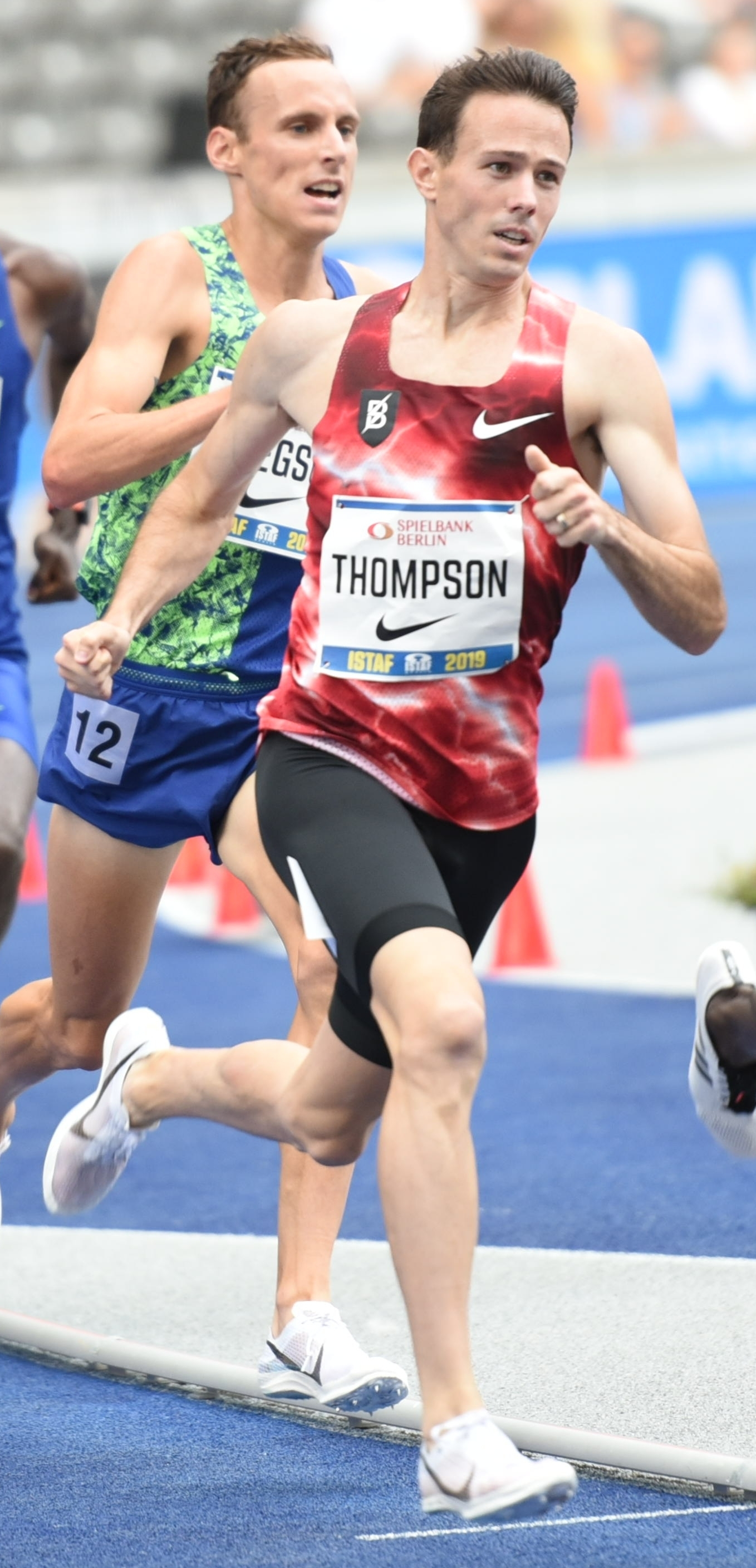

Personal information
- Full name: Joshua Thompson
- Born: May 9, 1993 (age 33)
- Home town: Logandale, Nevada, U.S.

Sport
- Country: United States
- Sport: Track and field
- Event(s): 1500 m, mile
- College team: Oklahoma State Cowboys
- Club: Bowerman Track Club
- Turned pro: 2018
- Coached by: Jerry Schumacher

Achievements and titles
- Personal bests: Outdoor; 800 m: 1:49.15 (Phoenix 2021); 1500 m: 3:35.01 (Berlin 2019); 3000 m: 7:57.76 (New York 2017); 3000 m SC: 8:30.29 (Kortrijk 2018); Indoor; 1500 m: 3:34.77 (Boston 2020); Mile: 3:52.49 (New York 2023); 3000 metres: 8:04.94 (Fayetteville 2017)

Joshua Thompson (born May 9, 1993) is an American middle-distance runner who specializes in the 1500 metres. He runs professionally for the Bowerman Track Club.

In September 2019, Thompson won the 1500m at The Match Europe v USA in 3:38.88. He also won the 1500m at the 2019 ISTAF Berlin.

In February 2023, Thompson won the 1500m final at the USATF Indoor Championships at the Albuquerque Convention Center in New Mexico in a time of 3:42.31. However, he was disqualified after the race when officials, using a video review, determined that Thompson had impeded a competitor near the end of the race, resulting in Sam Prakel being declared the winner in 3:42.62.
