= Duncan Hamilton (runner) =

American track and field athlete (born 2000)

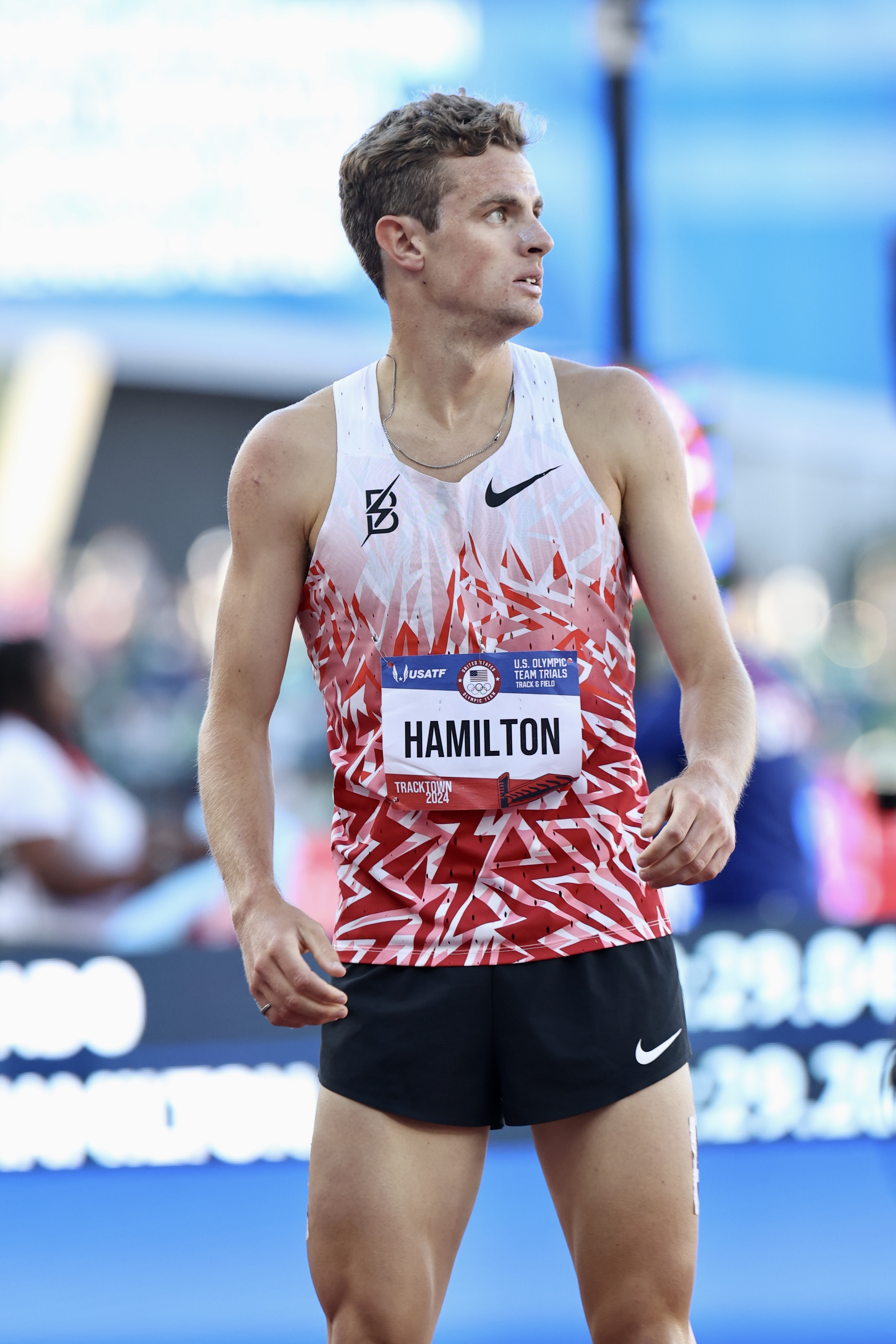
- Hamilton at the 2024 United States Olympic trials

Personal information
- Born: July 14, 2000 (age 26)

Sport
- Country: United States
- Sport: Track and field
- Events: Steeplechase, long-distance running
- University team: Montana State
- Club: Bowerman Track Club
- Turned pro: 2023
- Coached by: Jerry Schumacher

Duncan Hamilton (born July 14, 2000) is an American track and field athlete who specializes in 3000 metres steeplechase.

== High school ==
Hamilton attended Bozeman High School in Bozeman, Montana. During his high school running career, he finished second in the state class AA cross country meet in both 2016 and 2017, helping the Hawks win their 10th straight cross country state title. He won the 1600m and finished second in the 3200m at the Montana state track meet in his senior year.

His 2016 Bozeman cross country team was the high-school Nike cross country national champion, edging out American Fork, Utah for the victory.

== College ==
Hamilton attended Montana State University. At the end of his time there, he was a six time Big Sky champion, six time All-American, the second fastest collegiate steeplechaser of all time, the American collegiate record holder in the steeplechase, and the first Bobcat to ever make The Bowerman watch list.

On May 27, 2023, at the NCAA West Regional, Hamilton ran the steeplechase in 8:16.23, the second fastest time in NCAA history, behind Henry Rono's 8:05.4 in 1978.

== Professional career ==
On July 6, 2023, Hamilton announced that he had signed a professional contract with Nike and the Bowerman Track Club.

== Results and personal records ==
Taken from IAAF profile

=== Championship results ===
Year	Meet	Venue	Event	Place	Time
2024	US Olympic Trials	Hayward Field	Steeplechase	6th	8:29.20
2023	U.S. Outdoor Championships	Hayward Field	Steeplechase	8th	8:24.91
2023	NCAA Outdoor Championships	Mike A. Myers Stadium	Steeplechase	2nd	8:32.18
2023	NCAA Indoor Championships	Albuquerque Convention Center	3000m	9th	8:02.71
2022	NACAC Championships	Grand Bahama Sports Complex	Steeplechase	2nd	8:31.19
2022	U.S. Outdoor Championships	Hayward Field	Steeplechase	4th	8:20.23
2022	NCAA Outdoor Championships	Hayward Field	Steeplechase	2nd	8:18.88
2022	NCAA Indoor Championships	Birmingham CrossPlex	3000m	10th	8:03.98
2021	U.S. Olympic Trials	Hayward Field	Steeplechase	H1 7th	8:25.70
2021	NCAA Outdoor Championships	Hayward Field	Steeplechase	5th	8:31.55
2021	NCAA Indoor Championships	Randal Tyson Track Center	One mile	H2 8th	4:10.34

=== Personal records ===
Surface	Event	Time	Date	Venue
Indoor track	One mile	3:59.64	February 5, 2022	The Podium
Indoor track	3000m	7:56.86	February 4, 2022	The Podium
Indoor track	5000m	13:34.45	Dec 3, 2022	Boston University
Outdoor track	1500m	3:39.15	April 15, 2022	Azusa, CA
Outdoor track	5000m	13:30.50	April 14, 2022	Azusa, CA
Outdoor track	Steeplechase	8:13.76	September 8, 2024	Zagreb, Croatia
