= Shelby Houlihan =

American middle distance runner (born 1993)

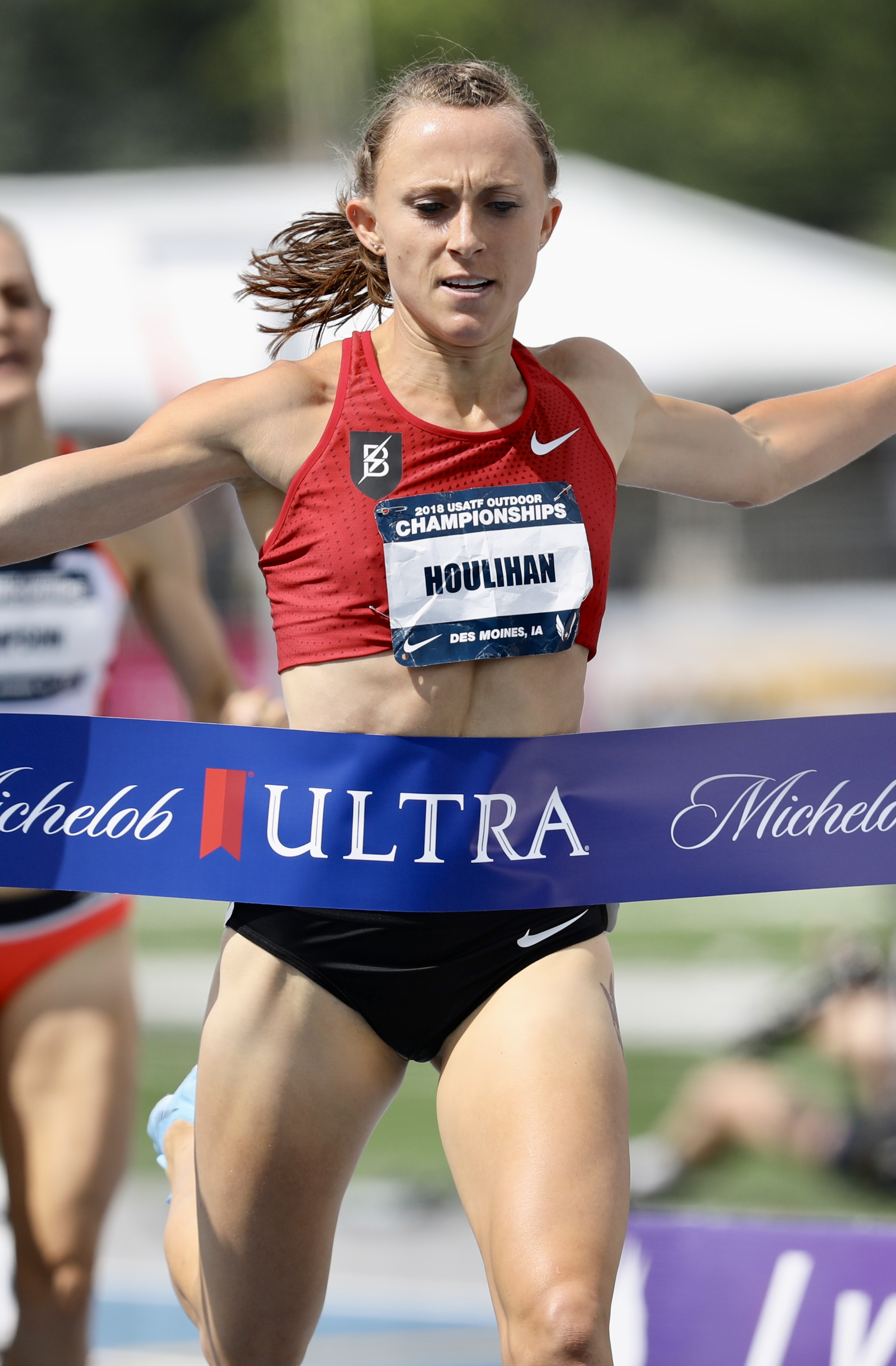
- Houlihan winning the 1500 meters at the 2018 USA Outdoor Track and Field Championships

Personal information
- Full name: Shelby Christine Prince Houlihan
- Nationality: United States
- Born: February 8, 1993 (age 33) Sioux City, Iowa, U.S.
- Height: 5 ft 3 in (1.60 m)

Sport
- Sport: Track and field
- Events: 5000 meters 1500 meters 800 meters
- College team: Arizona State University Sun Devils
- Club: Bowerman Track Club (2015-2021)
- Turned pro: 2015
- Coached by: Jerry Schumacher (2015-2021)

Achievements and titles
- Personal bests: 800 m: 1:59.92 (Azusa 2019); Indoor Mile: 4:20.30i (Boston 2025); 1500 m: 3:54.99 AR (Doha 2019); 5000 m: 14:23.92 (Portland 2020)
Medal record
Women's athletics
Representing the United States
World Indoor Championships
Silver medal – second place	2025 Nanjing	3000 m
NACAC U23
Gold medal – first place	2014 Kamloops	800 m
Continental Cup
Silver medal – second place	2018 Ostrava	1500 m

Shelby Houlihan (born February 8, 1993) is an American middle- and long-distance runner. Houlihan is the American record holder in the 1500m and won the silver medal in the 3000m at the 2025 World Indoor Championships. She is a 14-time US National Champion, winning seven indoor and seven outdoor titles from 1500m to 5000m. While at Arizona State University she won the 2014 NCAA 1500m championship.

Houlihan served a four-year doping ban from 2021 to 2025 after testing positive for nandrolone.

== Personal life ==
Shelby Houlihan was born in Sioux City, Iowa. Her mother and uncle were both competitive runners, as well as her half-sister.

== High school ==
Houlihan attended East High School in Sioux City. She held high school personal records of 4:43.64 in the one mile run, 2:07.35 in the 800 meter run, and 4:26.39 in the 1500 meter run. She was the 2011 Iowa Gatorade Player of the Year awards Girls Track and Field Runner of the Year and the 2010 Iowa Gatorade Player of the Year awards Girls Cross Country Runner of the Year. She claimed eight Drake Relays crowns, while also earning the title of Drake Relays Outstanding Female High School Performer for being the first female athlete from a high school to win three events in one year. Houlihan graduated from East High School in 2011.

== NCAA ==
Houlihan attended Arizona State University (ASU) for college. She was the 2014 NCAA champion in the 1500 meters at ASU as a junior. She was the first student at Arizona State University to win a national individual title in the outdoor 1500 meters.

Houlihan was a 12-time NCAA Division I All-American, the second most in Arizona State history, and an NCAA Track champion. She holds Arizona State Sun Devils school records in the 800 meters, 1500 meters, one mile, and 3000 meters.

== International and professional ==
Houlihan began competing for Nike and the Bowerman Track Club under coach Jerry Schumacher in 2015. She was among seven women who were trained by Schumacher who made it to the Olympics. Houlihan said of her teammates, "After watching all of my teammates make the team, I knew that I could do the same. The prelim felt very easy and gave me a lot of confidence going into the final. I thought the final would most likely be much faster, but I knew I was fit and capable of handling a fast pace." She also stated, "It's just amazing to have teammates be able to push me every day. It's something I've never had before. Even that has put me above and beyond what I've done before. Obviously, I made the right decision for me."

=== 2014: NACAC ===
Houlihan qualified for the 2014 North American, Central American and Caribbean Athletic Association Championship in Kamloops, British Columbia, Canada where Houlihan won gold in the 800 meters in 2:03.00 ahead of Rachel Francois and Jenna Westaway.

=== 2016: Olympics ===
Houlihan qualified for the 2016 Summer Olympics in the women's 5000 meters after finishing second in the US trials to Molly Huddle. When she finished the race, Houlihan cried. Houlihan said of the moment, "I've been working for that moment my entire life and for it all to come together and happen was one of the most amazing experiences of my life".

Houlihan placed fourth in her heat in the 5000 m preliminary at the Olympics, qualifying her for the final. Houlihan placed 11th in the 5000m final with a time of 15:08.89, finishing as the highest-placing American. After the race, she said, "I didn't place as high as I wanted to, and I've got to take that as a learning step and just try to move forward and make me stronger. I wouldn't have guessed I'd be doing the 5K this year. Ideally, I'd like to stick with it. Once I get the (mileage) volume up and get more aerobically strong, I'm going to be even more of a threat. I'm excited to see where that could take me."

Houlihan's hometown minor league hockey team, the Sioux City Musketeers, honored her after the Olympics with an ovation and ceremonial first puck.

Houlihan placed 6th in 4:23.0 at the 2016 Fifth Avenue Mile.

=== 2017 ===
Houlihan qualified for the London 2017 World Championships in the women's 5000 meters after winning the 5000 meters at the 2017 USA Outdoor Track and Field Championships. Houlihan ran 15:00.37 to place 3rd in the preliminaries and ran 15:06.40 to place 13th in the final.

=== 2018 ===
At the 2018 World Indoor Championships, making up more than 10 meters on the final lap, Houlihan passed Fantu Worku to place 5th (8:50.38) in the 3000 meters final and 4th in 4:11.93 at the 1500 meters final for the 2018 IAAF World Indoor Championships after winning the 3000 meters (9:00.08) and the 1500 meters (4:13.07) titles at the 2018 USA Indoor Track and Field Championships in Albuquerque, New Mexico.

On July 21, 2018, Houlihan ran the 5000 m in 14:34.45 in Heusden, Belgium. Assisted by pacer Shalane Flanagan, Houlihan broke Shannon Rowbury's 2016 American record of 14:38.92.

Houlihan placed second in the 1500 m at the 2018 IAAF Continental Cup.

=== 2019 ===
At the 2019 World Outdoor Championships, Houlihan set a personal best and new American record of 3:54.99 in the final of the 1500m, finishing in 4th place.

=== 2020 ===
On July 10, at a Bowerman Track Club time trial, Houlihan broke her own American record in the 5000m in a time of 14:23.92, just ahead of teammate Karissa Schweizer in 14:26.34. On July 31, Houlihan, along with Colleen Quigley, Elise Cranny and Karissa Schweizer established a World Record in the women's 4x1500 meters relay with a time of 16:27.02, eclipsing the previous World Record of 16:33.58 set by a quartet of Kenyan runners on May 25, 2014. The record was ratified in December 2020.

=== 2021: Anti-doping rule violation and ban ===
On June 11, 2021, Houlihan received a four-year ban from the sport, retroactive to January 14 of the same year, due to testing positive for nandrolone. A Court of Arbitration for Sport tribunal rejected her explanation for the nandrolone source being from a contaminated pork burrito, calling its probability "close to zero".

=== 2025: Return to racing after suspension ===
Houlihan returned to racing in February 2025, winning the indoor 3000 meters in 8:31.56 at the Razorback Invitational in Arkansas. In March 2025, she won a silver medal in the 3000 meters at the World Indoor Championships in Nanjing. In August 2025, she won the gold medal in the 5000 meters at the 2025 USA Outdoor Track and Field Championships in Oregon.

== Beer Mile World Classic ==
During her doping suspension, Houlihan was allowed to participate in the Beer Mile World Classic's "Legends & Elites Race." She won the women's division and set a new world record of 5:43.81, becoming the first woman to break six-minutes. However, due to her ban from USATF events, organizers did not allow Houlihan to compete in the women's championship beer mile.

== International championship results ==
Championship	Event	Venue	Place	Time
2025 World Athletics Championships	5000m	Tokyo, Japan	4th	14:57.82
2025 World Athletics Indoor Championships	3000m	Nanjing, China	2nd	8:38.26

== National championship results ==
US National Championship	Event	Venue	Place	Time
2025 USA Outdoor Track and Field Championships	5000m	Eugene, Oregon	1st	15:13.61
2020 USA Indoor Track and Field Championships	3000m	Albuquerque, New Mexico	1st	8:52.03
2020 USA Indoor Track and Field Championships	1500m	Albuquerque, New Mexico	1st	4:06.41
2019 USA Outdoor Track and Field Championships	5000m	Des Moines, Iowa	1st	15:15.50
2019 USA Outdoor Track and Field Championships	1500m	Des Moines, Iowa	1st	4:03.18
2019 USA Indoor Track and Field Championships	2 Mile	Ocean Breeze, New York	1st	9:31.38
2019 USA Indoor Track and Field Championships	1 Mile	Ocean Breeze, New York	2nd	4:29.92
2019 USA Cross Country Championships	10 km	Tallahassee, Florida	1st	32:47
2018 USA Outdoor Track and Field Championships	5000m	Des Moines, Iowa	1st	15:31.03
2018 USA Outdoor Track and Field Championships	1500m	Des Moines, Iowa	1st	4:05.48
2018 USA Indoor Track and Field Championships	3000m	Albuquerque, New Mexico	1st	9:00.08
2018 USA Indoor Track and Field Championships	1500m	Albuquerque, New Mexico	1st	4:13.07
2017 USA Outdoor Track and Field Championships	5000 m	Sacramento, California	1st	15:13.87
2017 USA Indoor Track and Field Championships	1 Mile	Albuquerque, New Mexico	1st	4:45.18
2017 USA Indoor Track and Field Championships	2 Mile	Albuquerque, New Mexico	1st	10:19.14
2016 United States Olympic Trials (track and field)	5000 meters	Eugene, Oregon	2nd	15:06.14
2016 USA Indoor Track and Field Championships	3000m	Portland, Oregon	5th	9:01.11
2015 USA Outdoor Track and Field Championships	1500m	Eugene, Oregon	10th	4:17.15
2014 USA Outdoor Track and Field Championships	800m	Sacramento, California	7th	2:01.12

== See also ==
- List of doping cases in athletics
