= Karissa Schweizer =

American runner (born 1996)

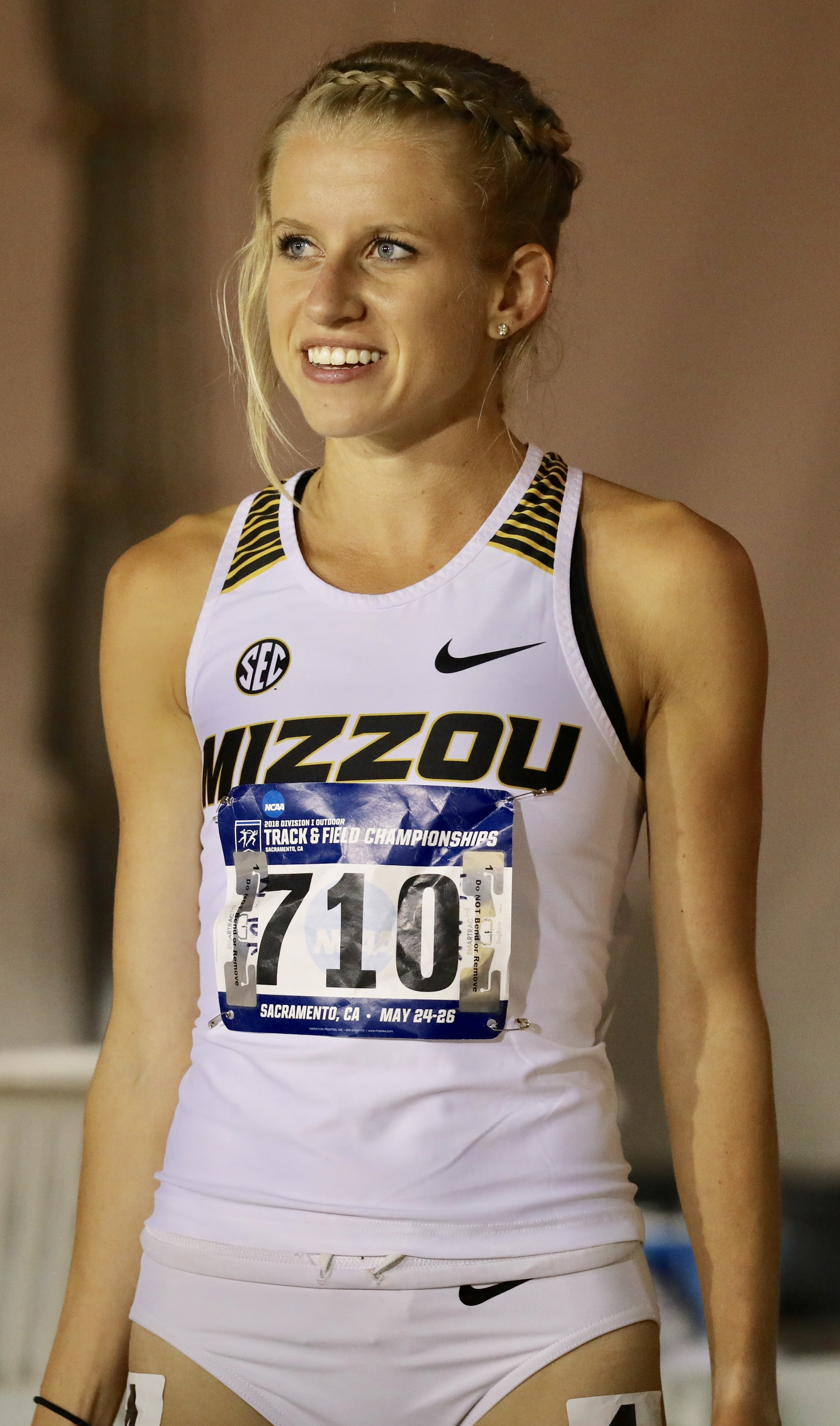
- Schweizer at the 2018 NCAA Division I Outdoor Track and Field Championships West preliminary rounds

Personal information
- Nationality: United States
- Born: May 4, 1996 (age 30)
- Home town: Urbandale, Iowa, U.S.
- Height: 5 ft 4 in (163 cm)

Sport
- Country: United States
- Sport: Track, long-distance running
- Events: 1500 m, 3000 m, 5000 m, cross country, 10,000 m
- College team: Missouri
- Club: Bowerman Track Club
- Turned pro: 2018
- Coached by: Jerry Schumacher

Achievements and titles
- Olympic finals: 2020 Tokyo; 5000 m - 11th; 10,000 m - 12th
- World finals: 2019 Doha; 5000 m - 9th
- Personal bests: Outdoor; 800 m: 2:02.77 (Portland 2020); 1500 m: 4:00.02 (Portland 2020); 3000 m: 8:40.25 (Phoenix 2021); 5000 m: 14:26.34 (Portland 2020); 10,000 m: 30:18.05 (Eugene 2022); Indoor; Mile: 4:27.54 i (New York 2018); 3000 m: 8:25.70 i (Boston 2020); 5000 m: 14:54.15 i (Boston 2026)

Karissa Schweizer (/ˈʃwaɪtsər/ SHWYTE-sər; born May 4, 1996) is an American middle- and long-distance runner, Olympian and World Record holder in the women's 4x1500 meters relay. She competed in the 2020 Tokyo Olympics in the 5000 meters and 10,000 meters events finishing 11th and 12th, respectively. In 2020, she set the indoor 3000 meters American Record with a time of 8:25.70.

Representing the University of Missouri, she won the 2016 NCAA Division I Cross Country Championships and holds five other NCAA individual championship titles including being the two-time NCAA Champion in the 5000 meters event.

== Early career ==
Schweizer grew up in Urbandale, Iowa and attended Dowling Catholic High School. She is the daughter of Mike and Kathy (Petricka) Schweizer, both of whom had successful collegiate track careers at Mankato State, with her father earning All-American honors. Karissa's grandfather, Frank Schweizer, was an NCAA Division II All-American runner at Mankato State. He coached track at Dowling Catholic High School for over four decades but retired before Karissa began her high school career. Her family has a rich running heritage at Dowling with her father and uncles, Steve and Doug, running track for the school. Her siblings Kelsey and Ryan also ran for Dowling, with Ryan winning eight state championships including a swimming title. He also ran a 3:49.04 PR in the 1500m to earn him a 3rd at the 2017 USA Track and Field Junior Championships. He is a member of the University of Notre Dame's track team. Karissa's cousins Alexis and Tyler ran cross-country for Dowling and a younger cousin, Lily, competed in 5th-grade track at Saint Francis.

Karissa never won an individual state or national cross-country title while at Dowling, never qualified for the Foot Locker Cross Country Championships, and her only track title was for 3 kilometer the 2011 IAHSAA championships.

== Collegiate career (2014-2018) ==
Recruited to the University of Missouri for track and cross country in 2014, Schweizer's first NCAA championship appearance was at the 2014 NCAA Division I Cross Country Championships, where she finished 155th. Two years later, she qualified for and placed third in the 5000 m at the 2016 NCAA Division I Outdoor Track and Field Championships.

The following cross country season, Schweizer was not considered a favorite for the individual NCAA title. Despite this, Schweizer defeated favorites Erin Finn and Anna Rohrer to win the 6 kilometer race in 19:41.6, becoming the first female national champion in any sport in Missouri Tigers history.

Schweizer ran the 3000 m and 5000 m at the next 2017 NCAA Division I Indoor Track and Field Championships, finishing second and first respectively. At the 2017 NCAA Division I Outdoor Track and Field Championships, Schweizer ran 15:39.93 in the 5000 m to win her third national collegiate title.

Despite victories at the 2017 NCAA Midwest Region and Southeastern Conference cross country championships, Schweizer did not repeat her win at the 2017 NCAA Division I Cross Country Championships, finishing 11th. That following indoor season, she completed her first title defense by winning the 5000m at the 2018 NCAA Division I Indoor Track and Field Championships, in addition to a 3000m victory.

She won the Honda Sports Award as the nation's top female cross country runner in 2017.

It was also at this time that Schweizer began competing at higher-profile invitational meets. At the 2018 Dr. Sander Invitational at the Armory Track & Field Center, Schweizer finished third in an international open mile field, her time of 4:27.54 placing her among the top five collegians all-time indoors. Later that season at the Millrose Games, Schweizer set the American collegiate record in the 3000m with a time of 8:41.60, her time beating Olympic medalist Jenny Simpson's previous record by one second. In the 2018 NCAA Division I Outdoor Track and Field Championships, Schweizer ran 32:14.94 in the 10,000m to finish third, twelve seconds under the existing meet record, set by Sylvia Mosqueda thirty years earlier. Two days later, after leading most of race, she easily repeated her 2017 5,000-meters win, closing out her remarkable college career with her sixth NCAA outdoor championship and NCAA indoor championship gold, a silver and two bronze medals.

== Professional career ==
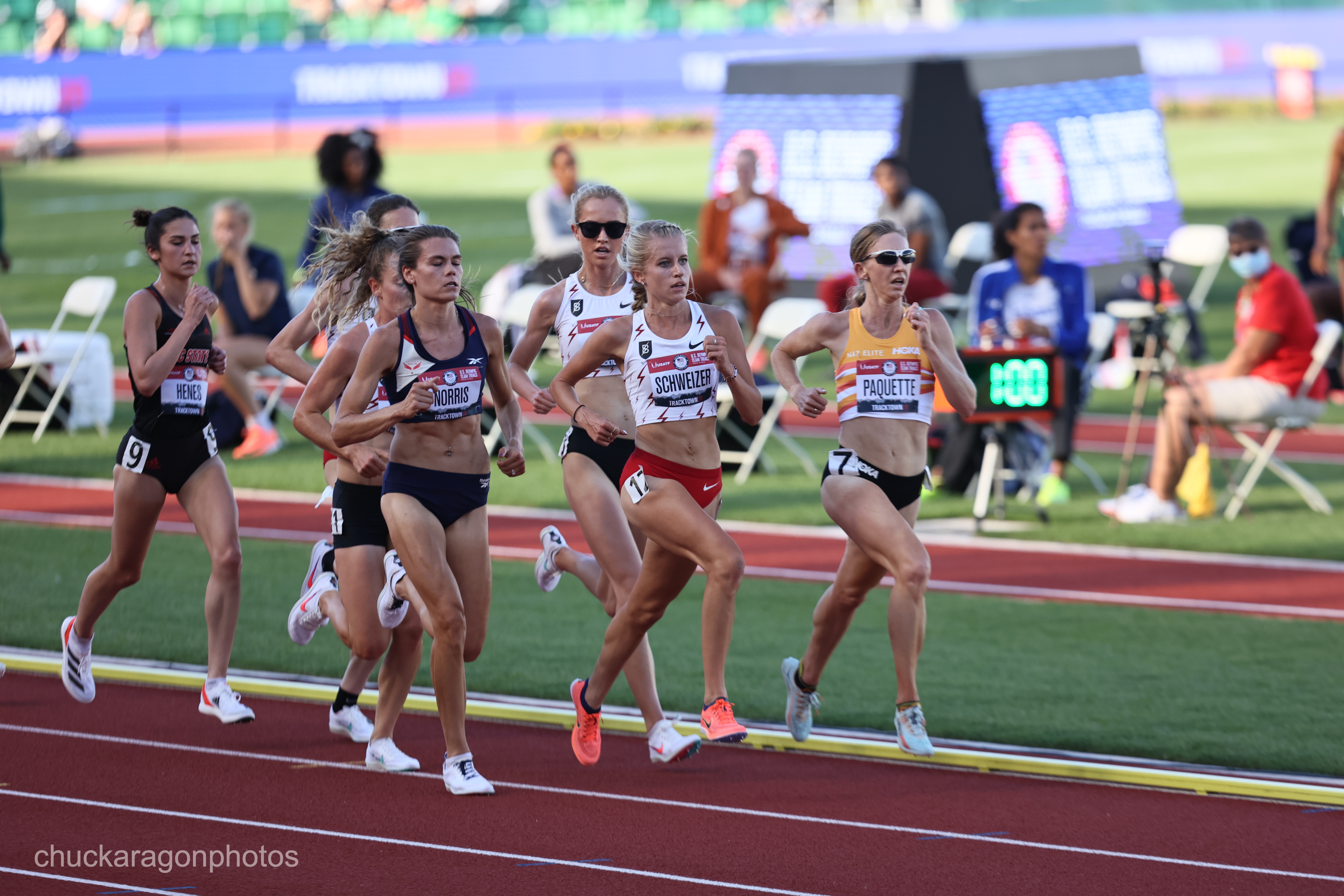
Josette Norris, Lauren Paquette and Schweizer competing at the US Olympic Trials in 2021

Schweizer signed professionally with the Bowerman Track Club in 2018.

Schweizer, running the fastest time 5K in the U.S. during the summer season, recorded a personal best 15:01.63 during a win at the Sunset Tour on July 10, 2019, in Azusa, California.

On February 28, 2020, at Boston University's "Last Chance Invitational" meet, Schweizer set a new indoor American Record in the 3000 m of 8:25.70. Her Bowerman Track Club teammates Shelby Houlihan and Colleen Quigley finished close behind in 8:26.66 and 8:28.71, respectively. Schweizer broke Shalane Flanagan's 2007 indoor AR by over seven seconds. Also, her time was faster than Mary Slaney's outdoor record of 8:25.83, set in 1985.

On July 10, 2020, Schweizer finished second to Shelby Houlihan in a 5000 m race conducted by the Bowerman Track Club with a new personal best of 14:26.34. Houlihan won the race in a new American Record of 14:23.92. Schweizer's time beat Houlihan's former American Record of 14:34.45 and made her the 14th fastest performer of all time.

On July 23, 2020, Schweizer set a new world leading time in addition to a new personal best in the 1500m, at 4:00.02, which made her the 8th fastest American to ever run the event, finishing in front of Colleen Quigley and Courtney Frerichs in 4:03.98 and 4:07.39, respectively.

On July 31, 2020, Schweizer, along with Colleen Quigley, Elise Cranny and Shelby Houlihan established a World Record in the women's 4x1500 meters relay with a time of 16:27.02, eclipsing the previous World Record of 16:33.58 set by a quarter of Kenyan runners on May 25, 2014. The record was ratified in December 2020,

On June 21, 2021, in 94-degree heat in Eugene, Oregon, Schweitzer finished 0.3 seconds behind Bowerman Track Club teammate Elise Cranny in the 5000m, qualifying for the U.S. Olympic team with a 15:28.11. Cranny had run the last 400 meters in 63.72 seconds. Schweitzer had Achilles surgery that fall.

On May 27, 2022, at the Prefontaine Classic in Eugene, competing in the 10,000m event, Schweitzer and Alicia Monson ran together for the last 5,000 meters, which they covered in under 15 minutes. Schweitzer edged Monson by a step crossing the finish line in 30:49.56. It qualified both for the World Athletics Championships United States team to be held in Eugene, Oregon.

== Competition record ==
Year	Competition	Venue	Position	Event	Notes
Major international competitions
2019	World Cross Country Championships	Aarhus, Denmark	56th	10 km	40:04
2019	World Championships	Doha, Qatar	9th	5000 m	14:45.18
2021	Olympic Games	Tokyo, Japan	12th	10,000 m	31:19.96
2022	World Championships	Eugene, United States	11th (h)	5000 m	14:53.69
2022	World Championships	Eugene, United States	9th	10,000 m	30:18.05
2024	Olympic Games	Paris, France	10th	5000m	14:45.57
2024	Olympic Games	Paris, France	9th	10000m	30:51.99
Domestic competitions
2015	United States Junior Championships	Eugene, Oregon	3rd	3000m	9:45.59
2016	NCAA Women's Division I Outdoor Track and Field Championships	Eugene, Oregon	3rd	5000m	16:02.82
2016	NCAA Women's Division I Cross Country Championship	Terre Haute, Indiana	1st	6 km	19:42
2017	NCAA Women's Division I Indoor Track and Field Championships	College Station, Texas	2nd	3000m	9:09.33
2017	NCAA Women's Division I Indoor Track and Field Championships	College Station, Texas	1st	5000m	15:19.14
2017	NCAA Women's Division I Outdoor Track and Field Championships	Eugene, Oregon	1st	5000m	15:38.93
2017	2017 USA Outdoor Track and Field Championships	Sacramento, California	4th	5000m	15:18.69
2017	NCAA Women's Division I Cross Country Championship	Louisville, Kentucky	11th	6 km	19:48
2018	NCAA Women's Division I Indoor Track and Field Championships	College Station, Texas	1st	3000m	8:53.36
2018	NCAA Women's Division I Indoor Track and Field Championships	College Station, Texas	1st	5000m	15:43.23
2018	NCAA Women's Division I Outdoor Track and Field Championships	Eugene, Oregon	3rd	10000m	32:14.94
2018	NCAA Women's Division I Outdoor Track and Field Championships	Eugene, Oregon	1st	5000m	15:41.58
2018	2018 USA Outdoor Track and Field Championships	Des Moines, Iowa	3rd	5000m	15:34.31
2019	2019 USA Cross Country Championships	Tallahassee, Florida	7th	10 km	33:29
2021	2020 United States Olympic Trials	Eugene, Oregon	2nd	5000m	15:28.11
2022	2022 USA Outdoor Track and Field Championships Trials	Eugene, Oregon	1st	10000m	30:49.56
2023	USA Outdoor Track and Field Championships	Eugene, Oregon	5th	10000m	32:32.10
2024	USA Olympic Trials	Eugene, United States	3rd	5000m	14:45.12
2024	USA Olympic Trials	Eugene, United States	3rd	10000m	31:41.56
2025	USA Outdoor Track and Field Championships	Eugene, Oregon	6th	10000m	32:10.82
2025	USA Outdoor Track and Field Championships	Eugene, Oregon	6th	5000m	15:16.76
