= Woody Kincaid =

American long-distance runner (born 1992)

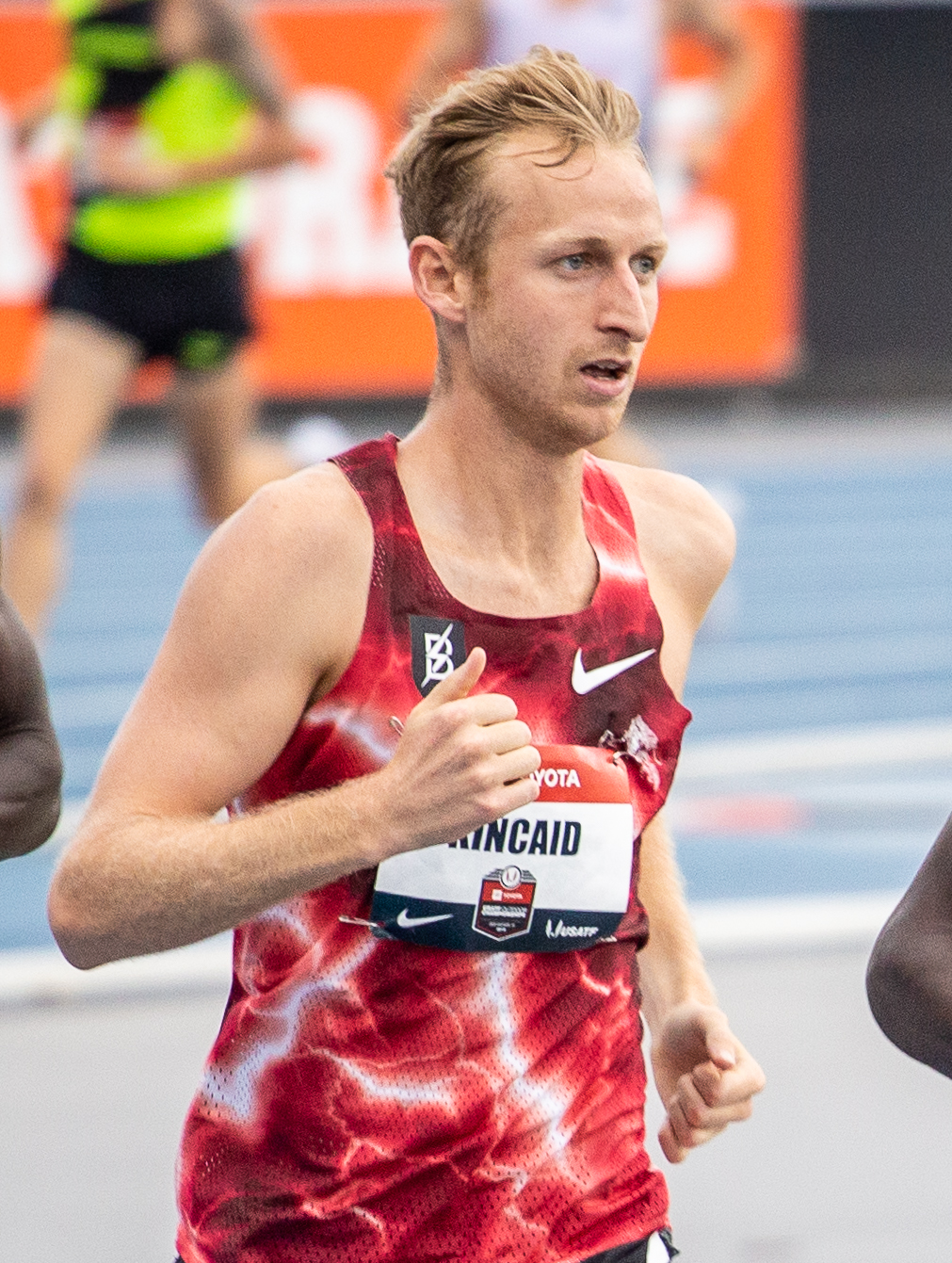
- Kincaid in 2019

Personal information
- Full name: William Kincaid
- Born: September 21, 1992 (age 33) Littleton, Colorado, U.S.
- Employer: Nike
- Height: 5 ft 10 in (178 cm)

Sport
- Country: United States
- Sport: Track and field
- Event: Long-distance running
- College team: University of Portland
- Club: Bowerman Track Club
- Turned pro: 2016
- Coached by: Mike Smith (2023–); Jerry Schumacher (2016–2022); Rob Conner (college)

Achievements and titles
- Olympic finals: 2020; 5,000 m, 14th 10,000 m, 14th 2024; 10,000 m, 15th
- World finals: 2023; 10,000 m, 11th
- Personal bests: 1500 m: 3:37.36 (Portland 2020); 3000 m: 7:38.81 (Monaco 2022); 5000 m: 12:54.40 (Florence 2023); 10,000 m: 26:57.57 (San Juan Capistrano 2024); Indoors; 3000 m: 7:40.71i (Boston 2023); 5000 m: 12:51.61i (Boston 2023); Indoors; Half marathon: 1:03:00 (New York City 2025)
Medal record
Men's athletics
Representing the United States
NACAC Championships
Gold medal – first place	2022 Freeport	5000 m

William "Woody" Kincaid (born September 21, 1992) is an American long-distance runner. He is a three-time national champion in the 10000 metres, with victories at the USA Outdoor Track and Field Championships in 2021, 2023, and 2026. Kincaid represented the United States at the 2020 Summer Olympic Games, the 2022 World Athletics Championships, 2023 World Athletics Championships, and the 2024 Summer Olympic Games. He won a gold medal in the 5000 metres at the 2022 NACAC Championships.

While competing for Columbine High School, Kincaid was a state champion in cross country. In college, he competed for the University of Portland, where he earned multiple All-American honors. He has competed professionally for Nike since 2016.

== High school ==
Woody Kincaid attended Columbine High School in Littleton, Colorado, where he emerged as one of the top high school distance runners in Colorado until he graduated in 2011. While competing in high school cross country and track he became a multiple-time state finalist highlighted by 2010 5A Cross Country State championship individual title.

== Collegiate ==
Kincaid attended University of Portland, where he competed in track and cross country representing Portland Pilots and coached by Rob Conner. He accumulated two All-American honors. At the 2016 NCAA Division I T&F Championships, he placed ninth in the men's 5000 meter final. Kincaid earned an MBA from Portland that year. One of his best performances at the university came when he was the fifth and final scorer on the 2014 third place men's cross country team. He finished in 70th place, passing an astounding 50 people in the last 2 kilometers of the race.

== Senior competition ==
=== 2016 - 2019: Early professional career ===
Kincaid turned pro in 2016, joining the Bowerman Track Club under coach Jerry Schumacher. The same year, he finished eighth in the 5000 meters at the US Olympic Trials. In March 2017, he earned a silver medal in two miles at USATF Indoor T&F Championships. The early part of his professional career was impacted by injury and he had surgery for a hernia in 2018.

On September 10, 2019, Kincaid became the eighth man in American history to break 13 minutes in the 5000 m, when he ran a time of 12:58.1. It was the fifth-fastest mark in US history at the time.

=== 2021: US champion for 10000 metres ===
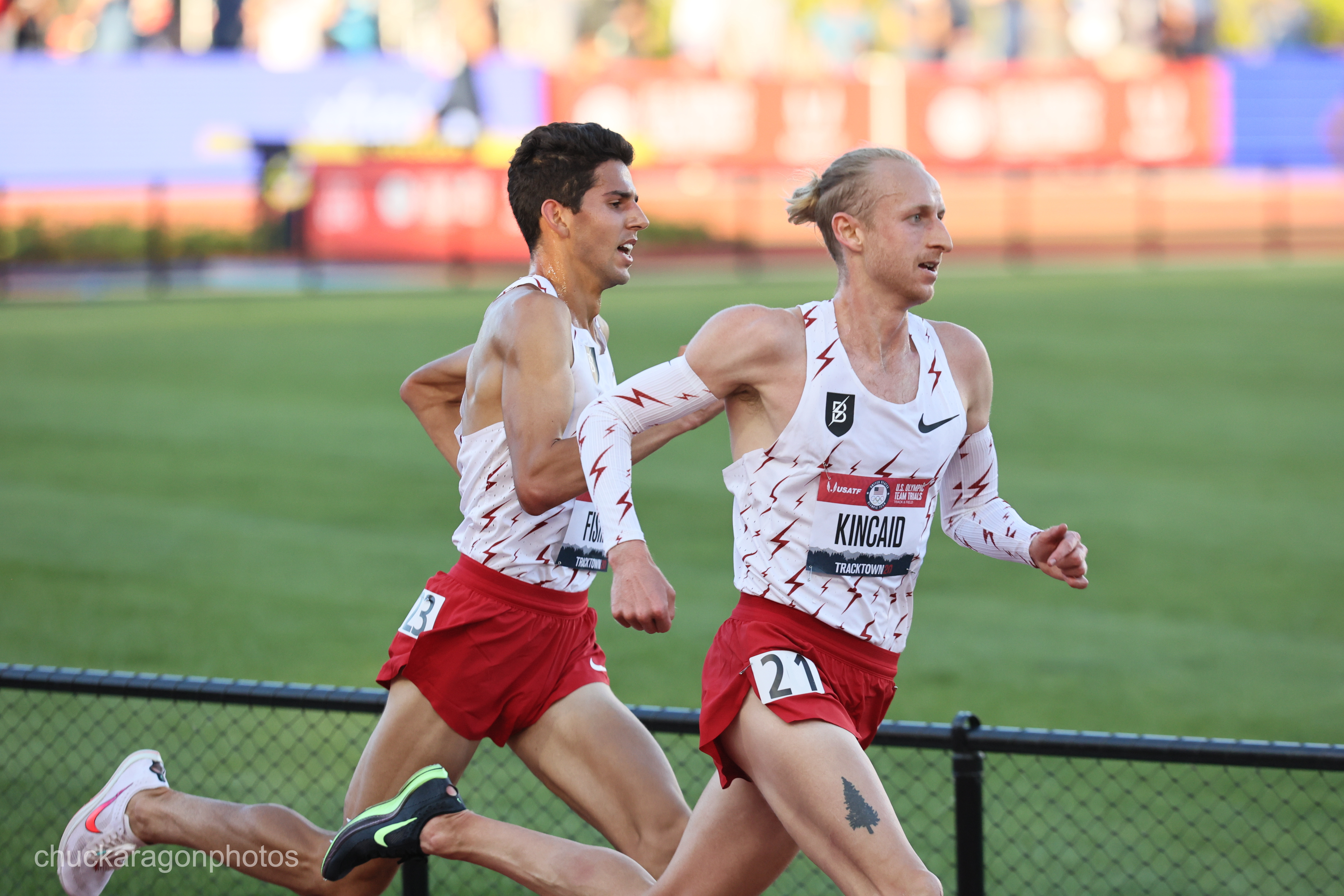
Kincaid (right) and Grant Fisher at the 2020 US Olympic Trials.

In 2021, he placed seventh in the Prickly Pear Invitational over 3000 m with a personal best of 7:46.07. The meet was held in Phoenix, Arizona on February 6. On February 20, he competed in the 10,000 m at the TEN, a meet held by Sound Running in Southern California. There Kincaid placed third to his Bowerman teammates Marc Scott and Grant Fisher, running a personal best of 27:12.78. His time moved him to sixth on the all-time U.S. list for the distance. At the US Olympic Trials in June, he won the 10,000 m event and a place on the US Olympic team for Tokyo along with Fisher and Joe Klecker. Kincaid also placed third in the 5000 m nine days later, securing his spot for a second event. At the Tokyo Games, Kincaid finished 14th and 15th in the 5000 m and 10,000 m, respectively.

=== 2022: Gold medal at the NACAC Championships ===
Kincaid started 2022 with a February 5000 m win at the Boston University David Hemery Valentine Invitational in Boston in an indoor personal best of 13:05.56. In May, he had to drop out from the USATF 10,000 m Championships due to a diaphragm spasm. He finished second at the USATF Championships 5000 m the following month, but at the World Championships held in Eugene, Oregon in July, he fell in the heats and broke his elbow. Kincaid rebounded once again the following month, winning the 5000 m title at the NACAC Championships in Freeport, Bahamas.

=== 2023: North American record for indoor 5000 metres ===
In 2023, Kincaid left the Bowerman Track Club to move to Flagstaff, Arizona and train under coach Mike Smith. In an interview, Kincaid talked about his decision to leave the club and long-time coach Jerry Schumacher, stating: “I’m getting older, I want to try different training,” Kincaid said. “…My dad passed away [in November 2021] and I kind of just needed a change in my life, in general. It’s not really a team thing.” On January 27 at the Boston University John Thomas Terrier Classic, the 30-year-old broke the North American indoor record in the 5000 m with a time of 12:51.61, slicing more than two seconds off Grant Fisher's mark set on the same track in February 2022. His closing splits included a 56.39 s for the final 400 m, and 26.27 s for the final lap. His performance put him fourth on the world indoor all-time list.

=== 2024 ===
Kincaid qualified for his second Olympics with his second place finish in the 10,000m at the U.S. Olympic trials. At the Paris Games, Kincaid finished 16th in the 10,000m.

=== 2026 ===
Kincaid placed 4th 27:20.84 at The TEN. On July 23, Kincaid won the 10,000 m title at the 2026 USA Outdoor Track and Field Championships at Icahn Stadium in New York City, outkicking Grant Fisher by 0.80 seconds in 30:13.66 with a 54.89-second final lap for his third national title in the event.

== Competition record ==
=== National championships ===
Year	Competition	Venue	Position	Event	Notes
2016	US Olympic Trials	Hayward Field; Eugene, Oregon	8th	5000 m	13:39.96
2017	2017 USA Indoor Track and Field Championships	Albuquerque, New Mexico	2nd	Two miles	8:38.66
2019	2019 USA Indoor Track and Field Championships	Staten Island, New York	19th	Two miles	8:43.48
2019	2019 USA Outdoor Track and Field Championships	Des Moines, Iowa	3rd	5000 m	13:26.84
2021	US Olympic Trials	Hayward Field; Eugene, Oregon	1st	10,000 m	27:53.62
2021	US Olympic Trials	Hayward Field; Eugene, Oregon	3rd	5000 m	13:27.13
2022	2022 USA Outdoor Track and Field Championships	Hayward Field; Eugene, Oregon	DNF	10,000 m	N/A
2022	2022 USA Outdoor Track and Field Championships	Hayward Field; Eugene, Oregon	2nd	5000 m	13:06.70
2023	2023 USA Outdoor Track and Field Championships	Hayward Field; Eugene, Oregon	1st	10,000 m	28:23.01
2023	2023 USA Outdoor Track and Field Championships	Hayward Field; Eugene, Oregon	9th	5000 m	13:30.84
2024	2024 US Olympic Trials	Hayward Field; Eugene, Oregon	2nd	10,000 m	27:50.74
2024	2024 US Olympic Trials	Hayward Field; Eugene, Oregon	9th	5000 m	13:31.40
2026	2026 USA Outdoor Track and Field Championships	Icahn Stadium; New York City	1st	10,000 m	30:13.66

== Personal bests ==
- 1500 meters – 3:37.36 (Portland 2020)
- 3000 meters – 7:38.81 (Monaco 2022)
  - 3000 meters indoor – 7:40.71i (Boston 2023)
- 5000 meters – 12:54.40 (Florence 2023)
  - 5000 meters indoor – 12:51.61i (Boston 2023)
- 10,000 meters – 26:57.57 (San Juan Capistrano 2024)
