= Sinclaire Johnson =

American middle-distance runner

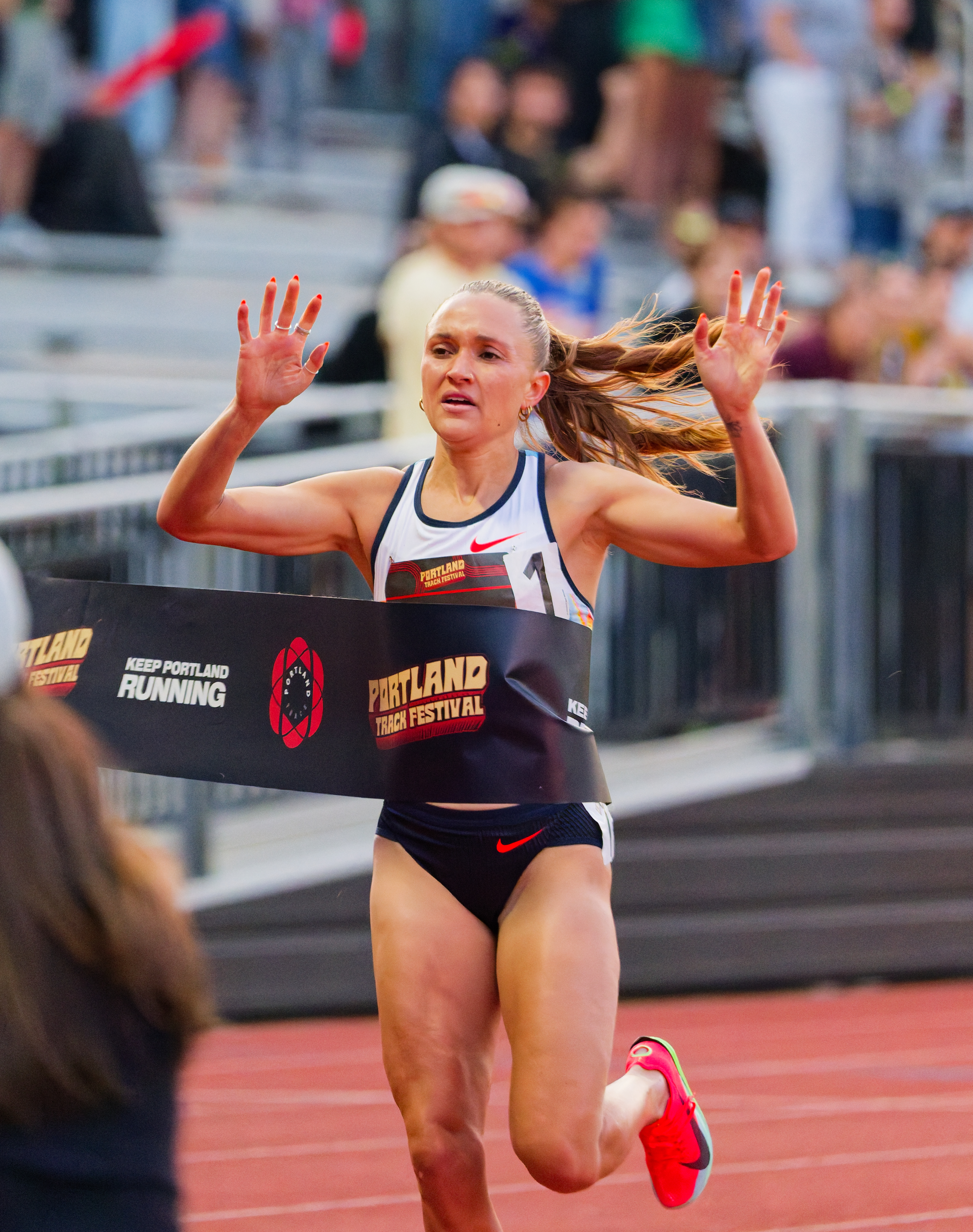
- Johnson in 2025

Personal information
- Born: April 13, 1998 (age 28) Indianapolis, Indiana, U.S.

Sport
- Sport: Track and field
- Event(s): 800 meters, 1500 meters, Mile
- College team: Oklahoma State Cowgirls
- Club: Elite Athlete Team
- Coached by: Craig Nowak

Achievements and titles
- World finals: 2022; 1500 m, 6th
- Highest world ranking: 9th (1500 m)
- Personal bests: 800 m: 1:59.76 (Padua 2023); 1000 m: 2:31.30 (Monaco 2025); 1500 m: 3:56.75 (Eugene 2024); Mile: 4:16.32 (London 2025) AR

Sinclaire Johnson (born April 13, 1998) is an American middle-distance runner. She is the 2022 US champion over 1500 m and has represented her country at the 2022, 2023, and 2025 World Championships. She is the North American record-holder in the mile. Competing for Oklahoma State University, she won the 2019 NCAA 1500 m title.

Johnson was raised in Altamonte Springs, Florida and went to Lake Brantley High School where she won several state championships and famously broke the 2:10 barrier for the 800m setting a FHSAA meet record. She then competed collegiately for the Oklahoma State University. Following her time at OSU, she joined the Bowerman Track Club in Portland, Oregon in 2019. In 2021, she left Bowerman to join the Nike Union Athletics Club under coach Pete Julian; in 2024, she left the Union Athletics Club and began being coached by Craig Nowak. On January 22, 2026, it was announced that Johnson signed with Hoka to their Elite Athlete Team.

== Collegiate career ==
=== 2017 ===
Johnson made her collegiate debut competing for the Oklahoma State Cowgirls on January 14 in Lincoln, Nebraska, running 1:35.96 over 600 m. Concentrating on the 800 m her freshman year, she ended her season with a 2:10.95 season best and a 7th-place finish at the Big 12 Championships.

=== 2017-18 ===
In her first collegiate cross country season, Johnson placed 28th at the Big 12 Championships and would go on to place 233rd at the national meet.

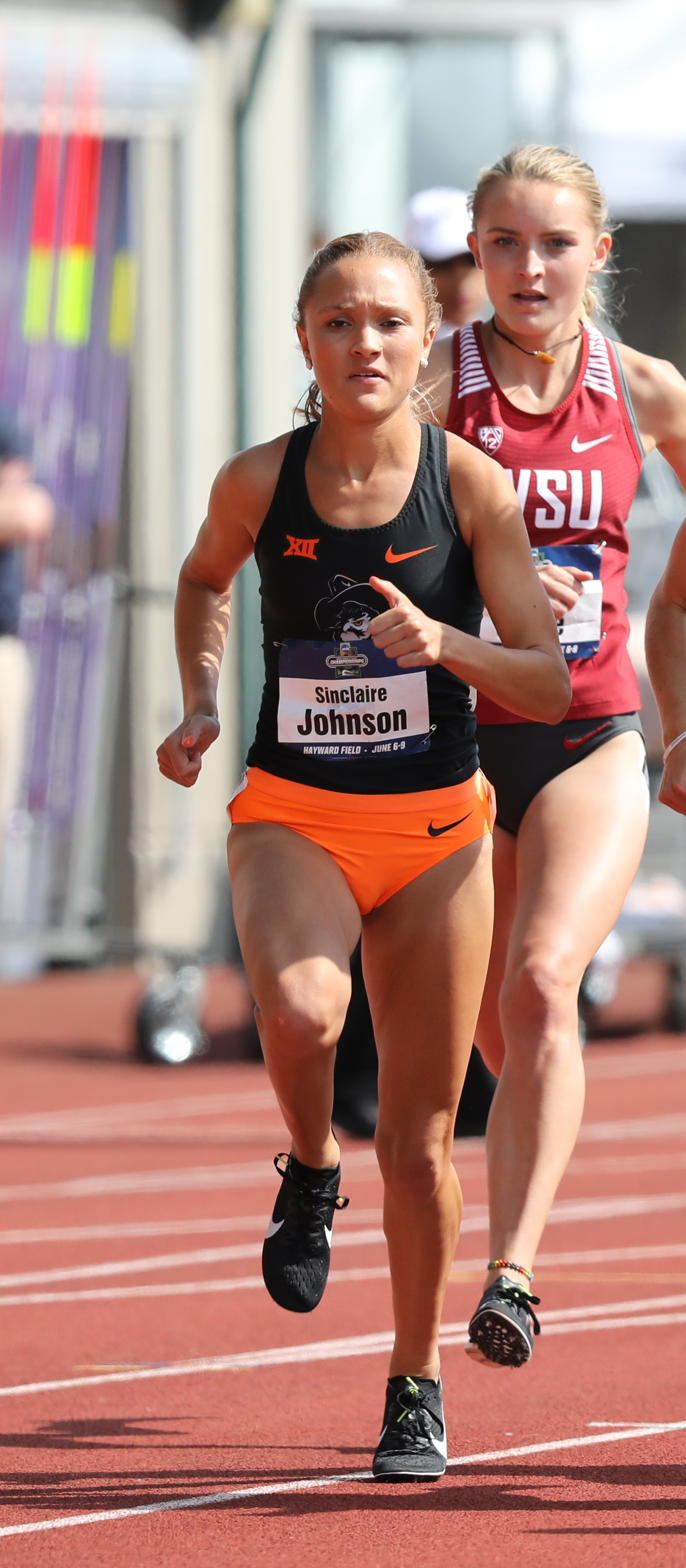
Johnson competing at the 2018 NCAA Division I Outdoor Track and Field Championships

After missing the bulk of the 2018 indoor season, Sinclaire opened her outdoor season on March 24 with an 800 m personal best of 2:09.55. After a 2:04.73 800 m personal best to take fifth at the Big 12 Championships, she shifted focus to the 1500 m where she qualified for the NCAA Championships with a 4:11.57 lifetime best clocking at the West Regional. At nationals, she was unable to make the final, finishing 24th overall in 4:27.72.

=== 2018-19 ===
Competing at the 2018 Big 12 Cross Country Championships, Johnson finished with a runner up performance in Ames, Iowa. At the national meet in Madison, Wisconsin, she placed 48th.

After winning the Big 12 indoor title in the 1000 m, Johnson competed at the 2019 NCAA Indoor Championships, where she earned a third-place finish anchoring the OSU DMR.

Outdoors, Johnson won the Big 12 title over 800 m but chose to contest the 1500 m at the NCAA Championships. After setting a personal best of 4:09.50 at the West Regional meet she cruised to a first-place finish at the national meet in Austin with a massive personal best of 4:05.98, breaking the meet record in the process.

The next month, she competed at the USA Championships in Des Moines, where she placed 4th, just missing out on qualifying for the World Championships in Doha by less than a quarter of a second. Despite that, she set another 1500 m personal best of 4:03.72 in the process.

In August 2019, Johnson announced her intention to turn professional, forgoing her final season of collegiate eligibility at OSU, and joining the Bowerman Track Club under coach Jerry Schumacher shortly thereafter.

== Professional career ==
=== 2020 ===
Johnson made her professional debut on February 8, 2020, at the Millrose Games Wanamaker Mile, placing 12th in 4:34.65.

=== 2021 ===
On May 9, 2021, Johnson broke the 2-minute barrier in the 800 m for the first time, running a time of 1:59.91 in Walnut, California.

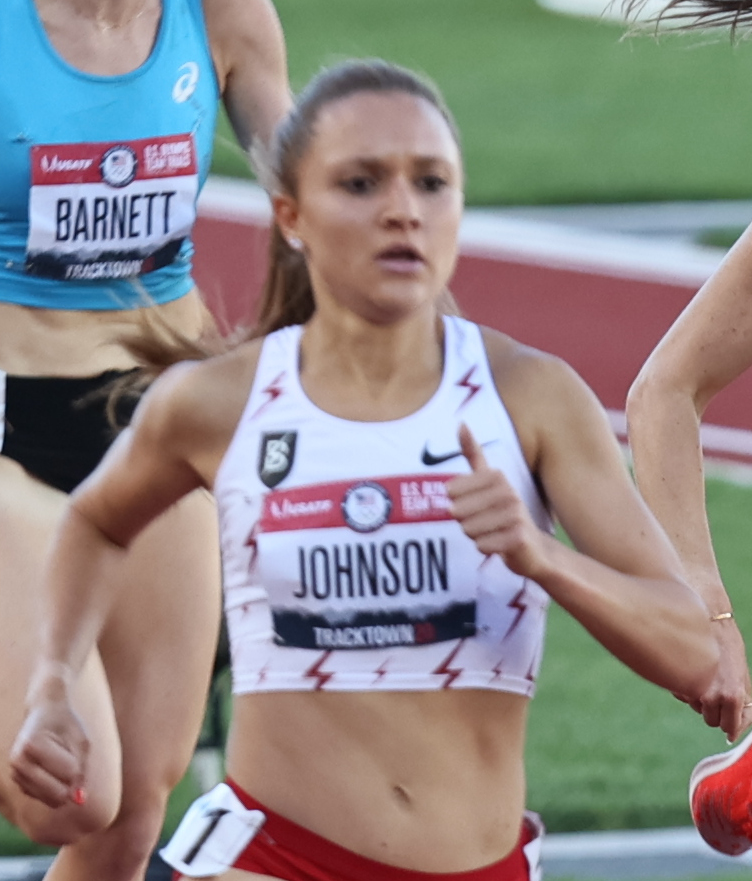
Johnson at the 2020 U.S. Olympic Trials

Competing at the 2021 US Olympic Trials, she chose to contest both the 800 m and 1500 m. On June 18 and 19, Johnson competed in the heats and semis of the 1500 m, qualifying through to the finals on June 21. In the final, she place 12th in 4:08.81, missing the Olympic team. Turning her focus to the 800 m, she was unable to make it out of the first round, running 2:04.05 for sixth in her heat.

At the end of the 2021 season, Johnson made the decision to leave the Bowerman Track Club, joining Pete Julian's newly named Union Athletics Club.

=== 2022 ===
On May 28, 2023, Johnson competed in her first ever Diamond League, running the 1500 m at the Prefontaine Classic. She would go on to place fourth, breaking the 4-minute barrier, with a personal best of 3:58.85.

In June, at the USA Championships, she took her first ever national title, winning the 1500 m in a time of 4:03.29, earning her a spot on Team USA for the 2022 World Championships in Eugene. At worlds, she qualified through to the final, placing fourth in her first round heat, and third in her semi-final. In the final, Johnson placed 6th, running 4:01.63, her second fastest 1500 m performance ever.

=== 2023 ===
Sinclaire opened her 2023 season winning a 800–1500 m double in the professional races at Nike Outdoor Nationals.

At the USA Championships, Johnson aimed to defend her 1500 m national title, but just missed the podium, placing fourth in 4:03.49. Despite only placing fourth, she qualified to represent to represent the United States at the World Championships in Budapest after runner-up Athing Mu chose to solely contest the 800 m.

In Budapest, she ran a seasons best of 4:01.09 in the heats to advance to the semi-finals. In the semis she ran a time of 4:06.39, placing 11th in her heat, failing to advance to the final.

On September 8, Johnson ran a seasons best 1500 m of 3:59.19 at the Memorial Van Damme in Brussels. The following week, on September 16, she competed in the Diamond League Final held at the Prefontaine Classic, placing 12th in 4:03.21. The following day, alongside Elise Cranny, she paced Gudaf Tsegay to a new 5000 m world record of 14:00.21.

== Competition record ==
=== International Competitions ===
Representing the United States
Year	Competition	Venue	Position	Event	Time
2022	2022 World Athletics Championships	Eugene, Oregon	6th	1500 m	4:01.63
2023	2023 World Athletics Championships	Budapest, Hungary	22nd (sf)	1500 m	4:06.39
2025	World Athletics Indoor Championships	Nanjing, China	6th	1500 m	4:04.07

=== National Championships ===
Representing the Oklahoma State Cowgirls (2019), the Bowerman Track Club (2020–2021), and the Union Athletics Club (2022–2024)
Year	Competition	Venue	Position	Event	Time
2019	USA Championships	Des Moines, Iowa	4th	1500 m	4:03.72
2020	USA 1 Mile Road Championships	Des Moines, Iowa	10th	Mile	4:50.3h
2021	US Olympic Trials	Eugene, Oregon	33rd (h)	800 m	2:04.05
2021	US Olympic Trials	Eugene, Oregon	12th	1500 m	4:08.81
2022	USA Championships	Eugene, Oregon	1st	1500 m	4:03.33
2023	USA 1 Mile Road Championships	Des Moines, Iowa	2nd	Mile	4:28.70
2023	USA Championships	Eugene, Oregon	4th	1500 m	4:03.49
2024	USA Olympic Trials	Eugene, Oregon	4th	1500m	3:56.75
2025	USATF Indoor Championships	New York City, New York	2nd	1500m	4:06.06
2025	USATF Outdoor Championships	Eugene, Oregon	2nd	1500m	4:03.77

=== NCAA Championships ===
Representing the Oklahoma State Cowgirls
Year	Competition	Venue	Position	Event	Time
2017	NCAA Cross Country Championships	Louisville, Kentucky	233rd	6 km	22:07.2
2018	NCAA Outdoor Track and Field Championships	Eugene, Oregon	24th (h)	1500 m	4:27.72
2018	NCAA Cross Country Championships	Madison, Wisconsin	48th	6 km	20:43.1
2019	NCAA Indoor Track and Field Championships	Birmingham, Alabama	3rd	DMR	10:55.01
2019	NCAA Outdoor Track and Field Championships	Austin, Texas	1st	1500 m	4:05.98
