= Grant Fisher =

American distance runner (born 1997)

- Grant Fisher at a press conference during the Wanda Diamond League Athletissima athletics competition.

Personal information
- Nationality: American
- Born: Grant Jackson Fisher; April 22, 1997 (age 29) Calgary, Alberta, Canada
- Home town: Grand Blanc, Michigan, U.S.
- Education: Stanford University
- Height: 5 ft 10 in (177 cm)

Sport
- Country: United States
- Sport: Track, cross country
- Events: Middle-, Long-distance running
- College team: Stanford Cardinal
- Turned pro: 2019
- Coached by: Mike Scannell

Achievements and titles
- Olympic finals: 2021 Tokyo; 5,000 m, 9th; 10,000 m, 5th; 2024 Paris; 5,000 m, Bronze; 10,000 m, Bronze
- World finals: 2025 Tokyo; 5,000 m, 8th; 10,000 m, 8th; 2022 Eugene; 5,000 m, 6th; 10,000 m, 4th
- Personal bests: 1500 m: 3:33.72+ (Eugene 2025); Mile: 3:48.29 (Eugene 2025); 3000 m: 7:25.47 AR (Eugene 2023); 2-mile: 8:11.09 (Eugene 2024); 5000 m: 12:46.96 (Brussels 2022); 10,000 m: 26:33.84 AR (San Juan Capistrano 2022); Indoors; 1500 m: 3:33.99i (Boston 2025); Mile: 4:03.54i (New York 2015); 2000 m: 4:49.48i (Boston 2026); 3000 m: 7:22.91i WR (New York 2025); 2-mile: 8:03.62i AR (New York City 2024); 5000 m: 12:44.09i WR (Boston 2025); Half Marathon : 1:00:53 (New York City 2026)
Medal record
Men's athletics
Representing the United States
Olympic Games
Bronze medal – third place	2024 Paris	5000 m
Bronze medal – third place	2024 Paris	10,000 m
- Updated on March 15, 2026

Grant Jackson Fisher (born April 22, 1997) is an American middle- and long-distance runner who is the world record holder in the short track 3000 m and 5000 m. Fisher also holds American records in the 3000 m, short track two mile, and 10,000 m events. At the 2024 Paris Olympics, Fisher won bronze medals in the 5000 m and 10,000 m, becoming the first American to medal in both events at an Olympic Games.

In high school, Fisher was named Gatorade Player of the Year for cross country for the 2013–2014 and 2014–2015 seasons. On June 4, 2015, he became the seventh American high school student to run a mile under four minutes. He competed for Stanford University from 2015 to 2019, where he was a 12-time All-American. At the 2017 NCAA Outdoor Track and Field Championships, he won the 5000 m, becoming the first American underclassman to do so in 28 years. Fisher has competed professionally for Nike since 2019.

== Early life and career ==
Fisher was born in Calgary, Alberta, on April 22, 1997, to Dan and Sonia Fisher. He has an older sister, Hailey, and a younger brother, Mark. He grew up in Grand Blanc, Michigan and attended Stanford University in Palo Alto, California. In addition to running, Fisher was an avid soccer player. He began playing the sport when he was four years old and in high school was a member of the Michigan Wolves, an elite level club team. Fisher now trains in Park City, Utah, under the guidance of Coach Mike Scannell.

While living in Grand Blanc, Michigan, Fisher began running in the spring of his seventh grade year, after joining his middle school cross country team. When he became a freshman in high school, Fisher joined both the soccer and cross country teams, where he made varsity for both.

=== 2011-12: State qualifier ===
In 2011, Fisher qualified for the state cross country meet and ran a 16:14 to finish 28th.

In the spring of 2012, he qualified for the state meet in the 1600 meters and 3200 meters; he ran a 4:30.23 to place 19th and 9:40.07 for 13th.

=== 2012-13: 3200 m state champion, World Youth Championships 1500 m finalist ===
In the fall of his sophomore year (November 2012), he missed the Michigan state cross country meet because he had to play for his soccer team in the state finals game.

Fisher ran two races indoors and won his first state title in the 1600 meters in 4:20.85.

In the spring of 2013, Fisher set big personal bests across all distances and won the state 3200 title in 9:04.33. He also finished second in the 1600 meters before extending his season to the New Balance Outdoor Nationals meet, where he won the second section of the mile in 4:12.74 and placed 8th overall.

Fisher competed in the USATF World Youth Trials and placed second in both the 1500 meters and 3000 meters, running 8:32.65 and 4:00.95—he represented the United States for the first team internationally at the 2013 IAAF World Youth Championships in Athletics in the 1500 meter run. Fisher set a new personal best of 3:50.30 to win his preliminary heat, closing in under 42 seconds, and placed 9th in the final in 3:52.00.

=== 2013-14: Foot Locker National XC champion; Adidas mile and Brooks two mile winner, World Junior Championships 1500 m ===
In the fall of his junior year (2013), he had personal bests of 15:02 at the Foot Locker Midwest Regional to win the event. Fisher then competed in the Foot Locker Nationals and won in 15:07. For the season, Fisher was named Gatorade Player of the Year for both Michigan and the United States.

Indoors, Fisher defended his state title in 4:11.32 and won the mile at the New Balance Indoor Nationals in 4:09.46. He also ran an 800 meters in 1:55.76.

Outdoors, Fisher broke 9 minutes for the first time in the 3200 meters with an early season 8:55.75 and defended his state title in that event in 9:07.11. He added the 1600 meters crown in 4:10.82 and was invited to High School Dream Mile at the Adidas Grand Prix, which he won in 4:02.02. Fisher was also invited to the Brooks PR Invitational, where he ran 8:51.28 to win the two mile run.

Fisher competed at the USATF World Junior Trials and placed second in the 1500 meters in 3:50.51. He ended his season at the World Junior Championships, where he ran 3:49.62 and did not advance to the final.

For the season, Fisher was named Gatorade Player of the Year for Michigan.

=== 2014-15: Repeat Foot Locker National XC Champion; Sub-4 minute mile ===
The fall of his senior year (2014), Fisher ran a 14:43.00 to win the Portage Invitational and a 15:03 to win 2014 Foot Locker Nationals. This victory made Fisher one of only 5 boys to ever win two Foot Locker national titles (the others included Abdirizak Mohamud, Lukas Verzbicas, Edward Cheserek, and Dathan Ritzenhein).

Indoors, Fisher three-peated at the state meet 1600 meters in 4:04.46 and made a sub-4 mile attempt at the New Balance Indoor Nationals. Fisher was at or below sub-4 minute pace before he stumbled on the rail around the final turn and finished in 4:03.54.

Outdoors, Fisher ran 3:42.89 for the 1500 meters at the Payton Jordan Invitational against collegiate athletes. He three-peated at the state meet 3200 meters in 8:53.41 and made another sub-4 mile attempt in the 1600 meters (there was a second finish tape and camera set up past the finish line). Fisher fell short again, coming through 1600 meters in 4:00.28 and finishing in 4:01.66. Just a week later, Fisher became the 7th high school athlete to break 4 minutes in the mile, tying Matthew Maton's time of 3:59.38 at the St. Louis Festival of Miles. Fisher was again invited to the Adidas Dream Mile and Brooks PR Invitational two mile; he defended his Dream Mile title in 4:01.73 ahead of Drew Hunter, but was outkicked by Hunter at Brooks, ending a two-year unbeaten streak dating to July 2013 against US high schoolers across all surfaces.

Fisher ended his high school career at the US Junior Championships, where he finished 3rd in the 1500 meters behind Hunter once more and Blake Haney, a freshman at the University of Oregon. Coincidentally, Haney was the last athlete to beat Fisher—he was teammates with Fisher at the 2013 Youth Championships and outplaced him in the final, finishing fifth.

For the season, Fisher was again named Gatorade Player of the Year for Michigan.

Year	1500 meters	1600 meters	One Mile	3000 meters	3200 meters	Two Miles
Freshman	4:07.75 (c)	4:26.0h	4:27.54 (c)	8:57.88 (c)	9:37.5h	9:40.95 (c)
Sophomore	3:50.30	4:11.27	4:12.74	8:32.65	9:04.33	9:07.49 (c)
Junior	3:49.62	4:10.82	4:02.02	8:19.0 (c)	8:55.75	8:51.28
Senior	3:42.89	3:57.93 (e.r)	3:59.38	8:04.77 (c)	8:40.53 (e.r)	8:43.57

== College career ==
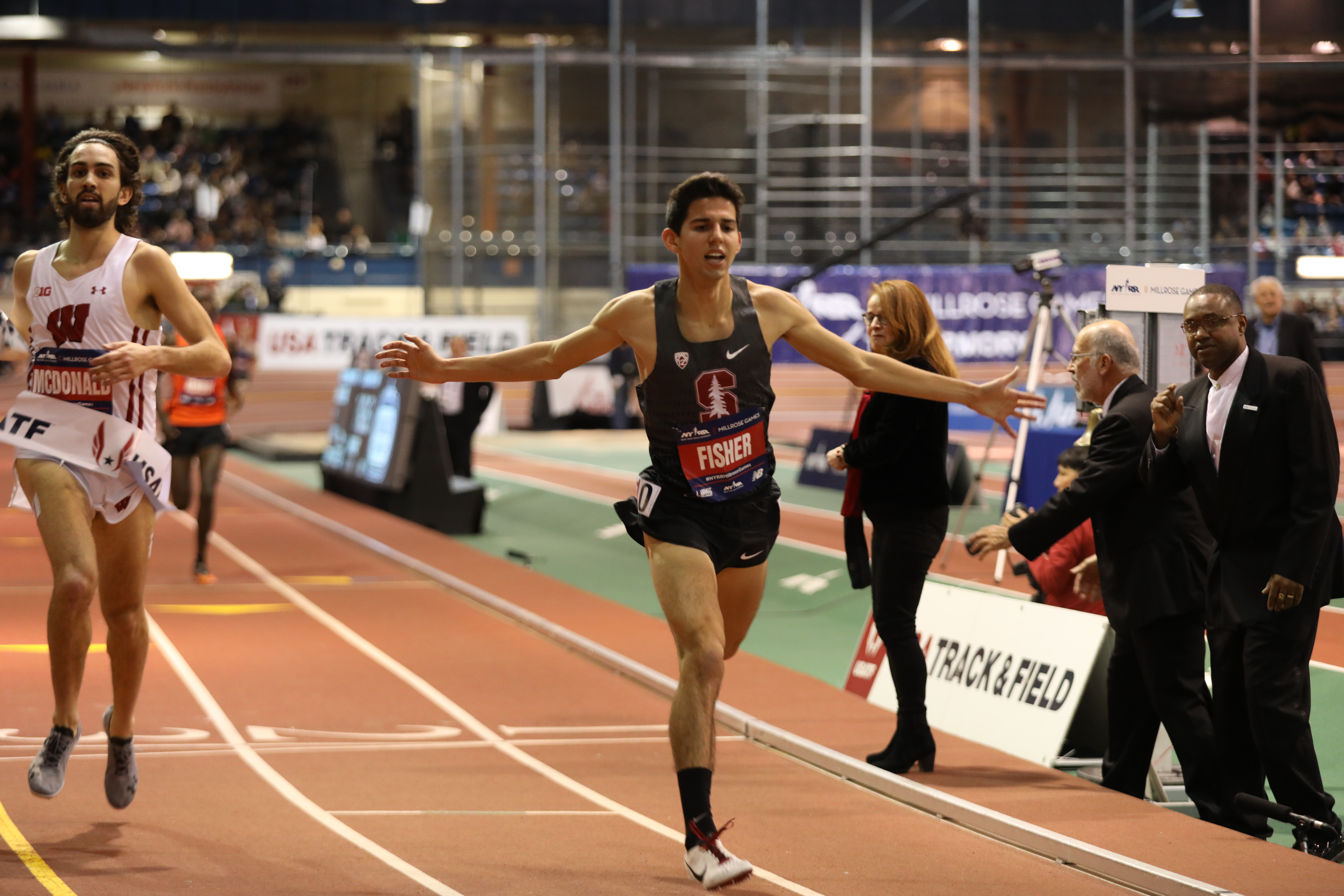
Fisher (center) wins the 3000 m at the 2019 Millrose Games, ahead of Morgan McDonald (left).

While competing for Stanford University from 2015 to 2019, Fisher was a 12-time All American. He competed four times in the NCAA Division I Cross Country Championships, improving from a 17th place finish his freshman year to second place his senior year. Fisher also recorded top finishes in the 5000 m at the NCAA Outdoor Track and Field Championships. He was sixth as a freshman in 13:30.13, a time that qualified the 19-year-old for the 2016 United States Olympic trials. As a sophomore in 2017, he won a national title in the event, becoming the first American underclassmen in 28 years to win the NCAA title for 5000 m. At subsequent championships, Fisher did not regain the title, finishing third as a junior and second as a senior.

Fisher also achieved runner up finishes at the NCAA Division I Men's Indoor Track and Field Championships. In 2019, he placed second in the 3000 m and was part of the distance medley relay team that also finished second. During the 2019 indoor track season, Fisher recorded the fourth fastest time ever by a collegian for the indoor 3000 m at the Millrose Games, running 7:42.62 to beat rival Morgan McDonald by half a second. After graduating from the university, the 22-year-old announced his decision to turn professional in June 2019 to compete for the Nike-sponsored Bowerman Track Club.

== Professional career ==
=== 2020: Professional debut during pandemic ===
Fisher placed 4th in the 3000m at the Boston University Last Chance Invitational on February 27, 2020. His teammates Lopez Lomong, Ryan Hill, and Evan Jager finished ahead of him. Grant's time of 7:39.99 was a PR for the distance and his first time under 7:40.

In the summer of 2020, Bowerman Track Club held several intrasquad meets in due to the lack of the races during the COVID-19 pandemic. During these races, Fisher set new PRs of 3:36.23 for 1500m and 13:11.68 for 5000m. He was also part of the 4 × 1500 m team who broke the American Record in 14:34.97. The meets were held in undisclosed locations around Portland, Oregon.

=== 2021: Olympic 5th and 9th ===
Fisher began 2021 with a series of personal bests, starting with a 7:37.21 in the 3000 m at the Prickly Pear Invitational on February 6. Later that month, he improved his 10000 m time to 27:11.29 at The Ten. This time was the fifth fastest ever run by an American in the event, and it met the Olympic qualifying standard. On March 6, Fisher set another personal best in the 5000 m with a time of 13:02.53 at the Sound Running Invite, also achieving the Olympic standard.

In June, the 24-year-old competed in the 2020 United States Olympic trials. He finished second in the 10000 m, in a tightly contested race against Woody Kincaid and Joe Klecker. In the 5000 m, he finished second behind Paul Chelimo. Less than half a second separated the top three finishers, who all ran their last lap under 53 seconds. Fisher's top three finishes in both these events qualified him to participate in the 2020 Summer Games in Tokyo. At the Games, Fisher finished fifth in the 10000 m in 27:46.39. He returned to the track to finish ninth in the 5000 m in 13:08.40.

=== 2022: World Championships 4th and 6th; 3000m, 5000m, & 10,000m American records ===
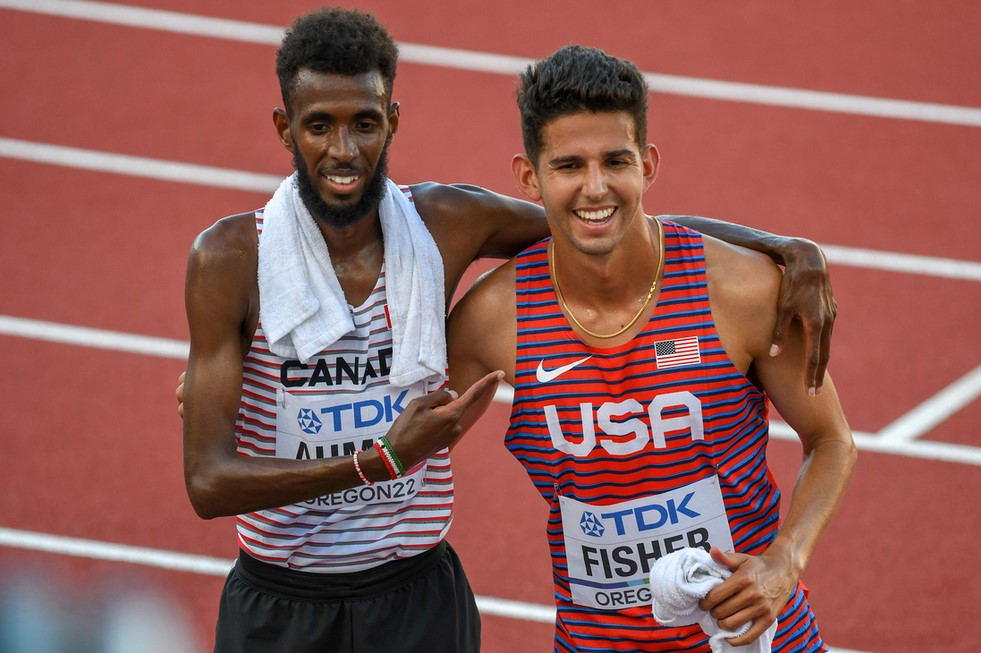
Fisher (right) and Mohammed Ahmed (left) after competing in the 5000 m final at the 2022 World Championships in Eugene, Oregon

In 2022, Fisher set four North American records and became the first American to run the 5000 m in under 12:50 and the 10000 m in under 26:40. His record-breaking year began at Boston University on February 12, where he set a North American record in the indoor 5000 m with a time of 12:53.73. His time surpassed the previous record of 13:01.26 held by Galen Rupp. On March 6, at The TEN, he broke another North American Record in the 10,000 m, clocking a time of 26:33.84. This mark placed him seventh on the all-time list for the distance.

On May 27, Fisher placed second in 10000 m at the 2022 USA Outdoor Track and Field Championships behind Joe Klecker in 28:28.80. He then won his first national title at these championships on June 26, winning the 5000 m in 13:03.86. His performances in these events qualified him for both distances at the 2022 World Athletics Championships in Eugene. On July 17 in Eugene, Fisher placed fourth in the 10000 m final, tying Galen Rupp for the best finish ever in the event at a world championship by an American. He also finished sixth in the 5000 m final.

After the World Championships, Fisher participated in three Diamond League events, where he notched several top-three finishes and set two more North American records. On August 10, he set a record of 7:28.48 in the 3000 m at the Monaco Diamond League to finish third. The following month, he set another record of 12:46.96 over 5000 m at the Brussels Diamond League behind Jacob Krop. Fisher concluded his season with a third-place finish over 5 km at the Diamond League Final in Zurich on September 7.

=== 2023: Injuries, departure from Bowerman Track Club; new 3000m record ===
Fisher competed in the 10000m at the 2023 USA Outdoor Track and Field Championships on July 6 in a bid to qualify for the 2023 World Athletics Championships. He did not finish in the top three, as needed to qualify for Worlds, fading to fourth on the final lap. An MRI after the race revealed an injury to his femur, and he scratched from the 5000 m. While recouping from his injury, Fisher engaged in cross-training to maintain his fitness. He resumed competition on August 31 at the Zürich Diamond League, where he finished third in the 5000 m in 12.54.49. Fisher followed that performance with a first-place finish in the 3000 m in 7:33.32 on September 6 at the Palio Città della Quercia in Rovereto, Italy. The 26-year-old concluded his season on September 17 by running the 3000 m of the Diamond League Final, hosted by the Prefontaine Classic. He finished third in 7:25.47, behind Yomif Kejelcha and Jakob Ingebrigtsen. Fisher’s time bettered his own American record by three seconds and was the eighth-fastest time ever run in the event.

On October 19, Fisher announced on Instagram that he was leaving the Bowerman Track Club after four years. His entire professional career up to that point had been spent with the team. He later announced in early 2024 that he had relocated to Park City, Utah, and was being trained by his high school coach, Mike Scannell. In an interview, Fisher discussed his decision to leave the club, stating: "I wasn’t the happiest athlete over the past year, and I think that reflected itself quite a bit in my training and my racing and getting injured in the middle of the year."

=== 2024: Olympic bronze medals in the 5000 m and 10,000 m ===
On February 11, 2024, Fisher set an American record in the indoor 2-mile of 8:03.62 at the Millrose Games. His time bested the previous record of 8:07.41 held by Galen Rupp, and he finished second behind Scotsman Josh Kerr, who set a world best. At the U.S Olympic Trials, Fisher confidently won the 10,000 m with a time of 27:49.47 to qualify for his second Olympics. This was his second national title and his first at 10,000 m. Fisher doubled back to win the 5000 m at the trials with a 13:08.85 just ahead of Abdihamid Nur running 13:09.01. This was the first time Fisher had won the 10,000 m and 5,000 m at the same U.S. track championship, and he was the first man to win both events at the trials since Rupp in 2012.

At the Paris 2024 Olympic Games, in the 10,000 metres final, Fisher secured a bronze medal in a time of 26:43.46, being just outleaned by Ethiopia's Berihu Aregawi, the silver medalist in 26:43.44, while Uganda's Joshua Cheptegei won gold in a new Olympic record of 26:43.14. In this race, 13 men ran faster than the former Olympic record of 27:01.17, set by Kenenisa Bekele in 2008. Fisher is the first American Olympic medalist in the event since Galen Rupp at the 2012 Summer Olympics in London. Additionally, on August 10, 5000 metres final, Fisher secured a second bronze medal with a strong finish, going from ninth to third on the last lap meaning that he placing immediately behind Ronald Kwemoi of Kenya, with a time of 13:15:13.

In October 2024, it was announced that he had signed up for the inaugural season of the Michael Johnson founded Grand Slam Track.

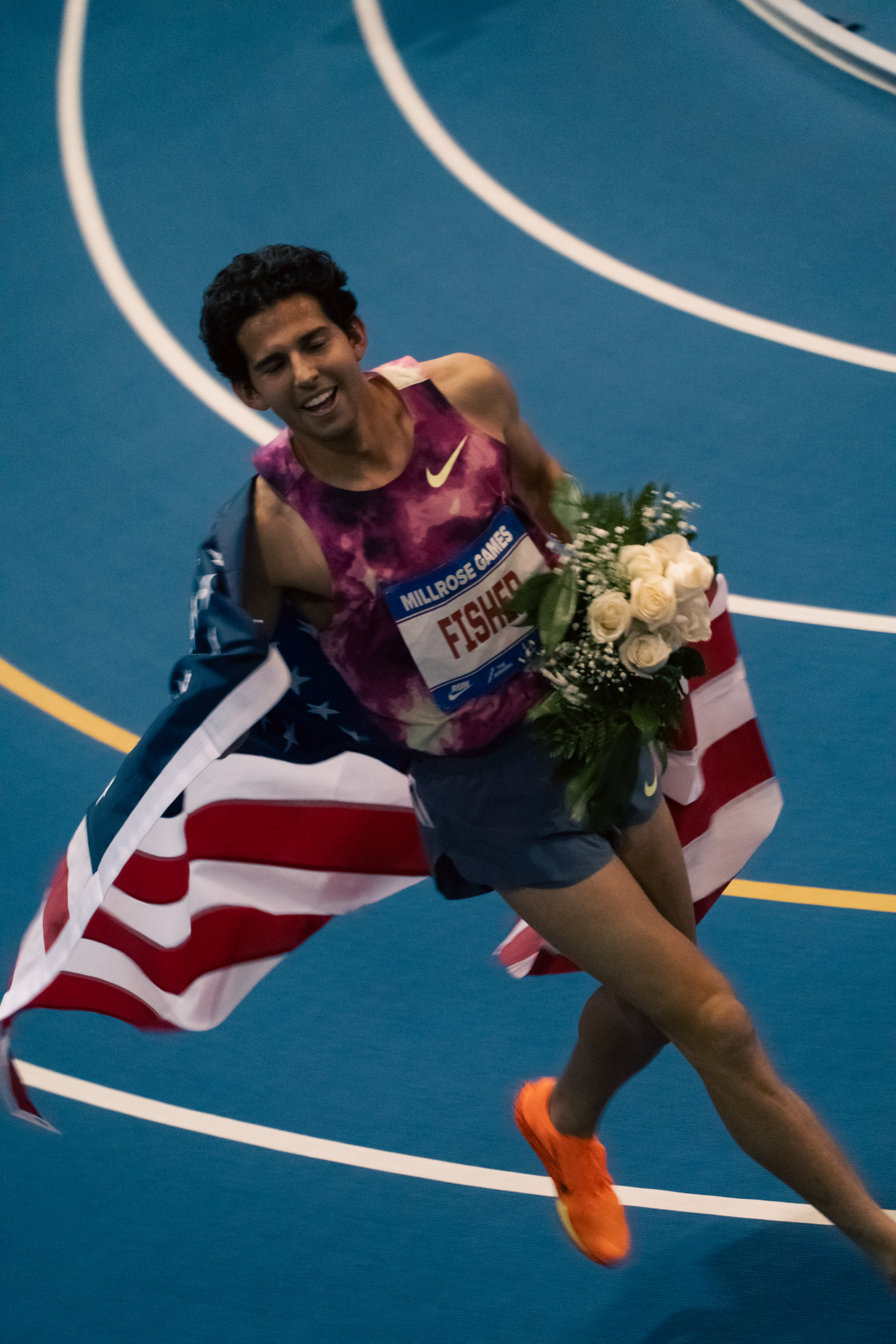
Fisher moments after setting a new 3000 m indoor world record at the 2025 Millrose Games

=== 2025: 3000 m and 5000 m indoor world records ===
Fisher opened his season on February 2 at the New Balance Indoor Grand Prix, setting a new personal best of 3:33.99 for the 1500 meters in finishing second to Josh Hoey.

On February 8 at the Millrose Games, in the 3000 meters, Fisher outkicked reigning Olympic 1500m gold medalist Cole Hocker over the final straightaway to run 7:22.91, a new world record indoors. Six days later, competing in the 5000 meters at the BU Valentine Invitational on February 14, Fisher ran 12:44.09, breaking the 20-year-old short track world record of Kenenisa Bekele.

Outdoors, Fisher opened his season by competing in the inaugural season of Grand Slam Track as a racer in the long distance category. At the first meet in Kingston on April 4–6, Fisher won the 5000 meters and placed third in the 3000 meters, finishing first in the overall standings to claim the $100,000 prize for the event. At the second meet in Miami on May 2–4, Fisher again won the overall $100,000 prize, repeating in the 5000 meters and this time placing second in the 3000 meters. Fisher scratched out of the third meet in Philadelphia with a hamstring issue during his warm up. In June, Fisher was a pacemaker in Faith Kipyegon's Breaking4 attempt.

On July 5, Fisher ran a personal best of 3:48.29 in the Bowerman Mile at the Prefontaine Classic. At the 2025 US Outdoor Track and Field Championships, Fisher finished second in both the 5000 meters and 10,000 meters, to Cole Hocker and Nico Young respectively.

=== 2026 ===
On January 24, at the New Balance Indoor Grand Prix, Fisher finished second to Hobbs Kessler in the short track 2000 meters. Kessler set a new world record of 4:48.79, while Fisher ran 4:49.48, also under the previous world record.

On July 23, at the 2026 USA Outdoor Track and Field Championships at Icahn Stadium in New York City, Fisher finished second in the 10,000 meters in 30:14.46, outkicked over the final lap by Woody Kincaid, who won in 30:13.66.

== Personal life ==
On December 31, 2025, Fisher got engaged with his longtime girlfriend, Sarah Walker.

== Competition record ==
=== International competitions ===
Representing the United States
Year	Competition	Venue	Position	Event	Notes
2013	World Youth Championships	Donetsk, Ukraine	9th	1500m	3:52.00
2014	World Junior Championships	Eugene, United States	20th	1500 m	3:49.62
2021	Olympic Games	Tokyo, Japan	9th	5000 m	13:08.40
2021	Olympic Games	Tokyo, Japan	5th	10,000 m	27:46.39
2022	World Championships	Eugene, United States	6th	5000 m	13:11.65
2022	World Championships	Eugene, United States	4th	10,000 m	27:28.14
2024	Olympic Games	Paris, France	3rd	5000 m	13:15.13
2024	Olympic Games	Paris, France	3rd	10,000 m	26:43.46
2025	World Championships	Tokyo, Japan	8th	5000 m	13:00.79
2025	World Championships	Tokyo, Japan	8th	10,000 m	28:57.85
2026	World Ultimate Championship	Budapest, Hungary	6th	5000 m	13:00.34

=== Circuit wins and titles ===
==== Grand Slam Track ====
Grand Slam Track results
Slam	Race group	Event	Pl.	Time	Prize money
2025 Kingston Slam	Long distance	5000 m	1st	14:39.14	US$100,000
2025 Kingston Slam	Long distance	3000 m	3rd	8:03.85	US$100,000
2025 Miami Slam	Long distance	3000 m	2nd	8:17.60	US$100,000
2025 Miami Slam	Long distance	5000 m	1st	13:40.32	US$100,000
2025 Philadelphia Slam	Long distance	3000 m		DNS	
2025 Philadelphia Slam	Long distance			DNS	

=== National championships ===
Year	Competition	Venue	Position	Event	Notes
2013	2013 World Youth Track & Field Trials	Hayward Field; Eugene, Oregon	2nd	1500 m	4:00.95
2013	2013 World Youth Track & Field Trials	Hayward Field; Eugene, Oregon	2nd	3000 m	8:32.65
2014	US Junior Championships	Hayward Field; Eugene, Oregon	2nd	1500 m	3:50.51
2015	US Junior Championships	Hayward Field; Eugene, Oregon	3rd	1500 m	3:58.77
2016	US Olympic Trials	Hayward Field; Eugene, Oregon	18th	5000 m	13:53.27
2021	US Olympic Trials	Hayward Field; Eugene, Oregon	2nd	10,000 m	27:54.29
2021	US Olympic Trials	Hayward Field; Eugene, Oregon	2nd	5000 m	13:26.82
2022	USA Outdoor Track and Field Championships	Hayward Field; Eugene, Oregon	2nd	10,000 m	28:28.81
2022	USA Outdoor Track and Field Championships	Hayward Field; Eugene, Oregon	1st	5000 m	13:03.86
2023	USA Outdoor Track and Field Championships	Hayward Field; Eugene, Oregon	4th	10,000 m	28:25.61
2023	USA Outdoor Track and Field Championships	Hayward Field; Eugene, Oregon	DNS	5000 m	
2024	US Olympic Trials	Hayward Field; Eugene, Oregon	1st	10000 m	27.49.47
2024	US Olympic Trials	Hayward Field; Eugene, Oregon	1st	5000 m	13:08.85
2025	USA Outdoor Track and Field Championships	Hayward Field; Eugene, Oregon	2nd	10,000 m	29:02.37
2025	USA Outdoor Track and Field Championships	Hayward Field; Eugene, Oregon	2nd	5000m	13:26.75
2026	USA Outdoor Track and Field Championships	Icahn Stadium; New York City	2nd	10,000 m	30:14.46

=== College ===
Representing Stanford University
Year	Pac-12 Cross Country Championships	NCAA Cross Country Championships	MPSF Indoor track and field Championships	NCAA Indoor track and field Championships	Pac-12 Conference Outdoor track and field Championships	NCAA Outdoor track and field Championships
2018-19	23:09.8; 1st	29:08.9; 2nd	Distance; Medley; Relay; 9:31.39; 1st	3000m 7:53.15; 2nd DMR; 9:31.70; 2nd	5000 m 2nd 13:50.30 1500 m 2nd 3:49.29	5000 m 14:06.63; 2nd
2017-18	23:44.9; 1st	10,000m 29:12.1; 5th		3000m 8:06.52; 4th DMR; 9:31.95; 4th	1500m 3:41.97; 3rd 5000m 14:12.81; 3rd	5000m 13:55.04; 3rd
2016-17	24:13.5; 2nd	10,000m 29:57.9; 5th			1500m 3:54.67; 1st	5000m 14:35.60; 1st
2015-16	23:28.6; 11th	10,000m 30:07.9; 17th			1500m 3:48.40; 17th	5000m 13:30.13; 6th

== Personal bests ==
Information from World Athletics profile.

=== High School ===
	Event	Time	Date	Location	Notes
Outdoor	800 m	1:58.0h	April 22, 2014	Hartland, Michigan	
Outdoor	1500 m	3:42.89	May 1, 2015	Palo Alto, California	
Outdoor	1600 m	4:00.28; 3:57.93+	May 30, 2015; June 4, 2015	Rockford, Michigan; St Louis, Missouri	
Outdoor	Mile	3:59.38	June 4, 2015	St Louis, Missouri	
Outdoor	3200 m	8:53.41; 8:40.53+	May 30, 2015; June 20, 2015	Rockford, Michigan; Shoreline, Washington	
Outdoor	2 miles	8:43.57	June 20, 2015	Shoreline, Washington	
Indoor	800 m	1:55.76	February 7, 2014	University Center, Michigan	
Indoor	1600 m	4:04.46; 4:02.13+	February 28, 2015; March 1, 2015	Ypsilanti, Michigan; Grand Blanc, Michigan	
Indoor	Mile	4:03.54	March 1, 2015	Grand Blanc, Michigan	
XC	5 km	14:43	October 4, 2014	Portage, Michigan	

=== College ===
	Event	Time	Date	Location	Notes
Outdoor	800 m	1:51.86	April 6, 2019	Palo Alto, California	
Outdoor	1500 m	3:39.60	May 2, 2019	Palo Alto, California	
Outdoor	5000 m	13:29.52	April 19, 2019	Palo Alto, California	
Indoor	3000 m	7:42.62	February 9, 2019	New York City, New York	
XC	8 km	23:09	October 26, 2018	Palo Alto, California	
XC	10 km	29:08	November 17, 2018	Madison, Wisconsin	

=== Professional ===
	Event	Time	Date	Location	Notes
Outdoor	1500 m	3:34.90	June 9, 2024	New York, New York	
Outdoor	Mile	3:48.29	July 5, 2025	Eugene, Oregon	#38 all time
Outdoor	3000 m	7:25.47	September 17, 2023	Eugene, Oregon	North American record
Outdoor	2 miles	8:11.09	August 21, 2021	Eugene, Oregon	
Outdoor	5000 m	12:46.96	September 2, 2022	Brussels, Belgium	#22 all time
Outdoor	10000 m	26:33.84	March 6, 2022	San Juan Capistrano, California	North American record
Indoor	1500 m	3:33.99	February 2, 2025	Boston, Massachusetts	#34 all time
Indoor	2000 m	4:49.48	January 24, 2026	Boston, Massachusetts	#2 all time
Indoor	3000 m	7:22.91	February 8, 2025	New York, New York	World record
Indoor	2 miles	8:03.62	February 11, 2024	New York, New York	North American record
Indoor	5000 m	12:44.09	February 14, 2025	Boston, Massachusetts	World record
Road	5 km	13:01	September 7, 2022	Zürich, Switzerland	
	Half marathon	1:00:53	March 15, 2026	New York, New York	
