= Bowerman Track Club =

American training group

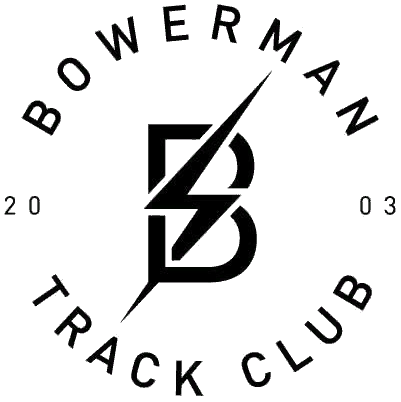
- Abbreviation: BTC
- Formation: 2003; 23 years ago
- Founder: Nike, Inc.
- Type: Distance runners training group
- Location: Eugene, Oregon, US
- Region served: US
- Website: bowermantc.com

The Bowerman Track Club (BTC) is an American training group sponsored by Nike, Inc. It previously featured a professional team last coached by Jerry Schumacher and assistants Shalane Flanagan, Chris Solinsky, and Alex Ostberg. The non-professional elite team is coached by Elliott Heath. The club is named after Nike co-founder Bill Bowerman.

The team moved from Portland to Eugene in 2022. Gabriela DeBues-Stafford left the club in 2022, citing lack of clarity around Shelby Houlihan's continued relationship with the team following Houlihan's doping ban and Schumacher's opposition to AIU and WADA.

The professional team was disbanded in February 2025 after 12 years and reportedly producing 10 Olympic and World Championship medalists.

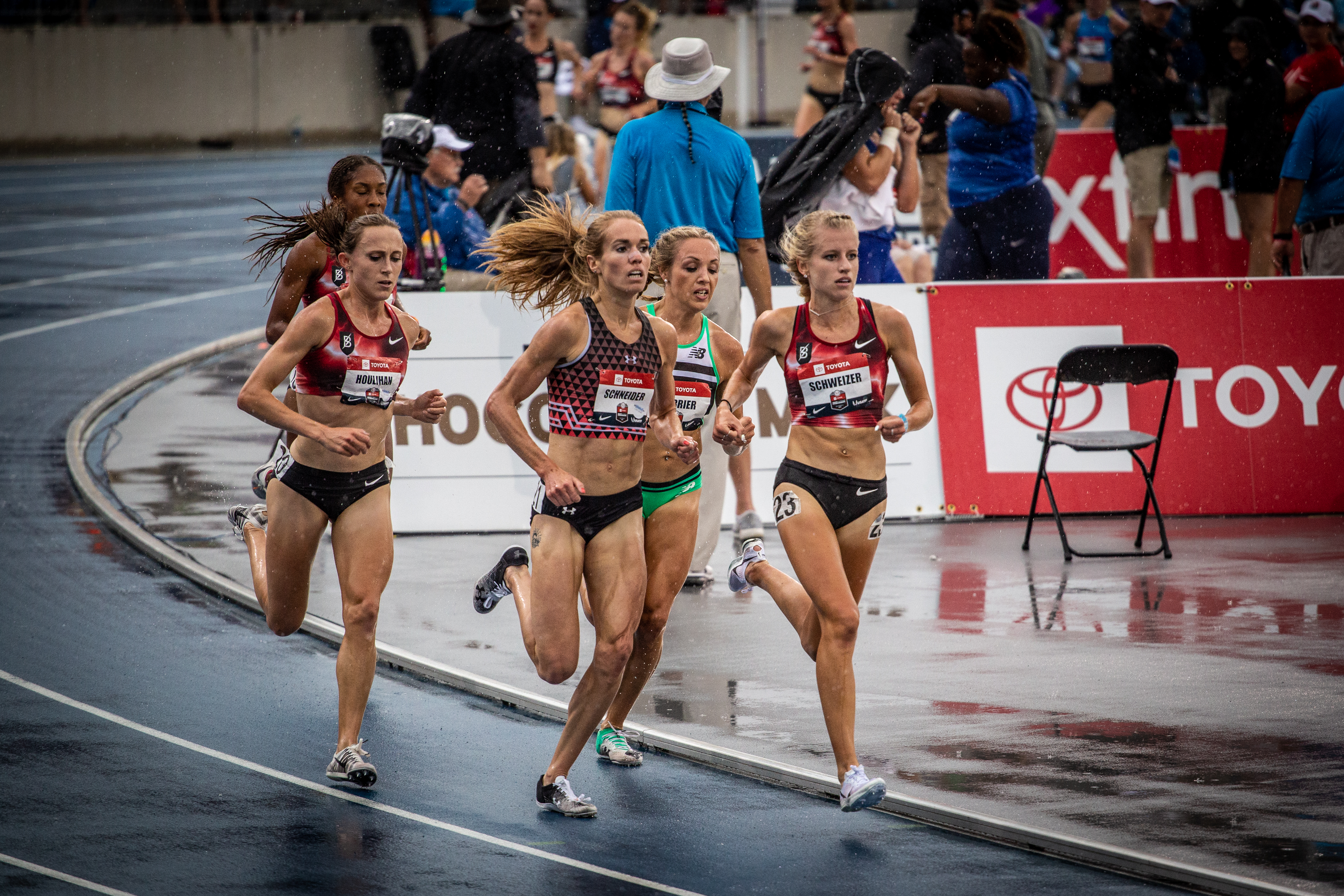
Leading group of Shelby Houlihan, Rachel Schneider, Karissa Schweizer from Bowerman Track Club on 5000 m run (2019 USA Championships)

== Notable members ==
Former members of the professional team include:

=== Men ===
- Mo Ahmed*
- Simon Bairu
- Amos Bartelsmeyer
- Andrew Bumbalough
- Matthew Centrowitz Jr
- Chris Derrick
- Grant Fisher
- Duncan Hamilton*
- Elliott Heath
- Charles Hicks*
- Ryan Hill
- Dan Huling
- Matt Hughes
- Evan Jager*
- Woody Kincaid
- Justyn Knight*
- Lopez Lomong
- Sean McGorty*
- Tim Nelson
- Marc Scott
- Chris Solinsky
- Cooper Teare
- Matt Tegenkamp
- Josh Thompson
- Kieran Tunivate*

=== Women ===
- Christina Aragon*
- Amy Cragg
- Elise Cranny
- Gabriela DeBues-Stafford
- Courtney Frerichs
- Kate Grace
- Marielle Hall
- Shelby Houlihan
- Emily Infeld
- Sinclaire Johnson
- Gwen Jorgensen
- Colleen Quigley
- Betsy Saina
- Karissa Schweizer*
- Andrea Seccafien
- Lucia Stafford

* Indicates athlete on the BTC pro roster when the team disbanded in 2025.

Members of the non-professional elite team include:

- Carrie Dimoff
- Tara Welling
