= Matt Tegenkamp =

American long-distance runner (born 1982)

Matthew Tegenkamp
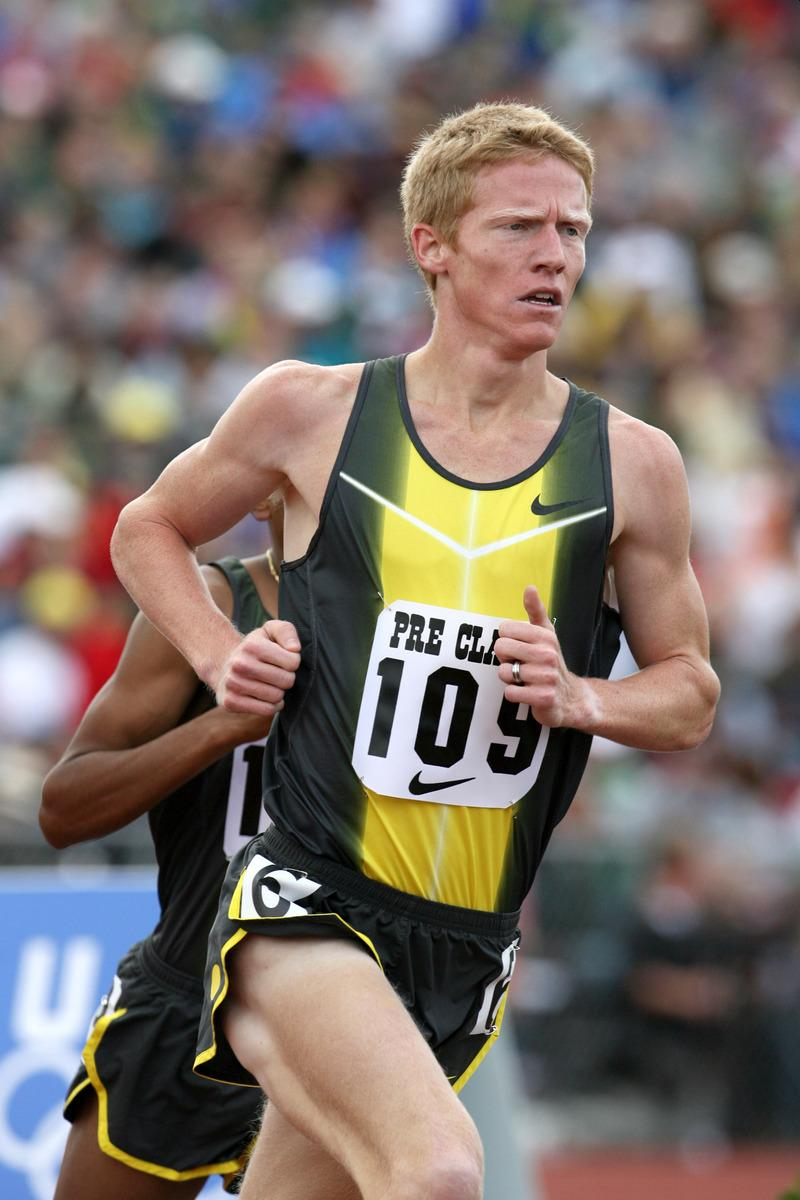
- Tegenkamp at the 2007 Prefontaine Classic

Personal information
- Nationality: American
- Born: January 19, 1982 (age 44) Lee's Summit, Missouri, U.S.
- Height: 6 ft 3 in (1.91 m)
- Weight: 145 lb (66 kg)

Sport
- Country: United States
- Sport: Athletics/Track, Long-distance running
- Events: 3000 meters, 5000 meters, 10,000 meters
- College team: Wisconsin Badgers
- Club: Bowerman Track Club
- Coached by: Jerry Schumacher
- Retired: 2015

Achievements and titles
- Olympic finals: 2008 Beijing; 5000 m, 13th 2012 London; 10,000 m, 19th
- World finals: 2007 Osaka; 5000 m, 4th 2009 Berlin; 5000 m, 8th 2011 Daegu; 10,000 m, 10th
- Highest world ranking: 2007 - 5,000 meters, 10th (Track and Field News)
- Personal bests: Outdoor; 1500 m: 3:34.25 (2007); Mile: 3:56.38 (2006); 3000 m: 7:34.98 (2006); 2-mile: 8:07.07 (2007); 5000 m: 12:58.56 (2009); 10,000 m: 27:28.22 (2011); Road; Half marathon: 62:02 (2014); Marathon: 2:12:28 (2013)
Medal record
Men's athletics
Representing United States
World Cup
| Bronze medal – third place | 2006 Athens | 5000 m |

Matthew "Teg" Tegenkamp (born January 19, 1982) is an American retired professional runner from Lee's Summit, Missouri who specialized in various long-distance events. Tegenkamp represented the United States at two Summer Olympics, in 2008 and 2012. He trained with other members of the KIMbia Athletics group and was sponsored by Nike during his professional career. Tegenkamp set an American record in the outdoor two mile^{[PRs]} and also achieved other performances that were near record breaking during his career.

== Running career ==
=== High school ===
After being part of the state championship team as a sophomore, Matt showed steady improvement throughout his early career. As a senior he set a Missouri state cross country course record (15:26.7) on the Oak Hills course. He gained national recognition his senior year at Lee's Summit High School when he placed second in the Midwest Regional for cross country and fifth at the Footlocker National Cross Country Championships. During his senior track campaign, Tegenkamp ran an 8:57.23 3200m and a 4:11.43 1600m to win both events at the Missouri state championships, leading his team to the state title.

=== Collegiate ===
Tegenkamp attended the University of Wisconsin–Madison, along with high school rivals Tim Keller and Josh Spiker. After redshirting his freshman season, he defeated two-time high school national champion Dathan Ritzenhein at the U.S. Junior Cross Country championships, handing Ritzenhein his first cross country defeat in several years. Tegenkamp then placed fifth at the World Junior Cross Country Championships, behind Ritzenhein and future world record holder, Kenenisa Bekele.

Tegenkamp soon began to struggle with injuries that hindered him until Wisconsin coach, Jerry Schumacher, changed his training regimen. He responded quickly, lowering his 5000m PR to 13:30.90 in 2004. Tegenkamp graduated from the University of Wisconsin–Madison in 2005 with a Bachelor of Science degree in human ecology.

=== Professional ===
Following graduation, Tegenkamp stayed in Madison to train as a professional under Schumacher. In 2006, he set personal bests at 1,500 meters (3:35.96), 3,000 meters (7:34.98) and the two-mile (8:16.50). Tegenkamp also ended his 2006 season by getting a bronze medal in the 5000m at the IAAF World Cup in Athletics, with a time of 13:36.83.

In 2007, he won the USA Indoor National 3k with a time of 7:46.08. Then, he set a personal and American record in the two-mile run at the Prefontaine Classic with a time of 8:07.07, breaking the existing record (Note: These records indicate placement with reference to the date of the indicated event where the record was achieved. Actual record placement may be different at the present time.) set by Alan Webb by more than four seconds.

Tegenkamp also finished second behind Bernard Lagat in the 5,000m at the 2007 U.S. Outdoor Track & Field Championships, which earned him the right to compete at the IAAF World Championships in Osaka. At the 2007 IAAF world championships Matt finished fourth in the 5,000m event, missing out on the bronze medal by .03 second, with a time of 13:46.78 to Moses Ndiema Kipsiro of Uganda's 13:46.75.

In 2008, Teg earned his first trip to the Olympic Games. As a "tune-up" for the Olympic Games, he ran the 1500m in 3:37.94 (a facility and state of Wisconsin record) at the UW-Madison McClimon Outdoor Track along with some of his training partners and one pacer for the first 2.75 laps on July 15, 2008. At the 2008 U.S. Olympic Trials in Eugene, Oregon, Tegenkamp qualified by finishing second to Lagat in the 5,000-meter run with a time 13:29.68.

Soon after the 2008 Beijing Olympic Games, Matt and wife Michelle Carson, and Matt's coach began efforts of moving to Portland, Oregon for Nike's Oregon Project along with other professional team members that were training under coach Schumacher at that time in Madison, WI.

In 2009, Tegenkamp became one of only 6 non-African runners to break the 13 minute barrier in the 5000 meters with his PR of 12:58.56. He was formerly the fifth fastest American of all time over the 5000 metres distance behind Bernard Lagat, Chris Solinsky, Bob Kennedy, & Dathan Ritzenhein.

In 2011, Tegenkamp made his first attempt at the 10,000 meter distance. He was once quoted saying, "Teg doesn't run no 10k," though he later retracted this statement and made his track 10,000 meter début on May 1, 2011 at the Payton Jordan Cardinal Invitational, running 27:28.22. He finished runner-up at the 2011 USA 10,0000 meter championships, closing the final 800 meters in 1:53.

In 2012, he qualified for the Olympics by placing second at the U.S. Olympic Trials. Tegenkamp then went on to compete in the 10,000 meters at the 2012 Summer Olympics, where he finished 19th at 28:18.26.

On July 4, 2013, Tegenkamp became the US Road 10k Champion at the Peachtree Road Race, finishing with a time of 28:25.

On October 13, 2013, Tegenkamp debuted at the marathon distance in the Chicago Marathon, placing 10th in 2:12:28.

Tengenkamp opened up the 2014 season by running a new PR of 1:02.04 at the New York Half-Marathon. Later in the season he finished 15th in the Washington Cherry Blossom 10 Mile Road Race with a PR of 47:57

In February 2016, Tegenkamp announced his retirement from the sport of track and field. He now works at Nike in product creation.

== Post running career ==
Tegenkamp officially announced retirement on February 1, 2016. After his running career, he moved to full-time in product creation for Nike at the main campus in Beaverton, Oregon after beginning that role part-time in 2013 while he was embarking on marathon running in his career.

== Personal bests ==
=== Notables ===
He became the American two-mile record holder, with a time of 8:07.07, set at the Prefontaine Classic in 2007. He also holds a 5,000 meter PR of 12:58.56 (September 4, 2009 in Brussels), which put him in line as the fourth American to have run under 13 minutes (third fastest all-time PR (Note: Matt Tegenkamp had the third fastest 5000m outdoor track all-time PR behind Dathan Ritzenhein and Bob Kennedy.)), and a 1,500 meter PR of 3:34.25. Tegenkamp's outdoor mile best is 3:56.38, which he achieved while becoming the first person to break four minutes in the mile on Wisconsin soil.

=== List of personal records (PRs) ===
- 1500 meters - 3:34.25 (July 3, 2007)
- Mile - 3:56.38 (May 6, 2006)
- 3000 meters - 7:34.98 (August 19, 2006)
- Two miles - 8:07.07 (June 10, 2007 - American Record)
- 5000 meters - 12:58.56 (November 4, 2009 - #7 all-time PR by an American)
- 10,000 meters - 27:28.22 (May 1, 2011)
- Marathon - 2:12:28 (October 13, 2013)
