= Evan Jager =

American steeplechaser (born 1989)

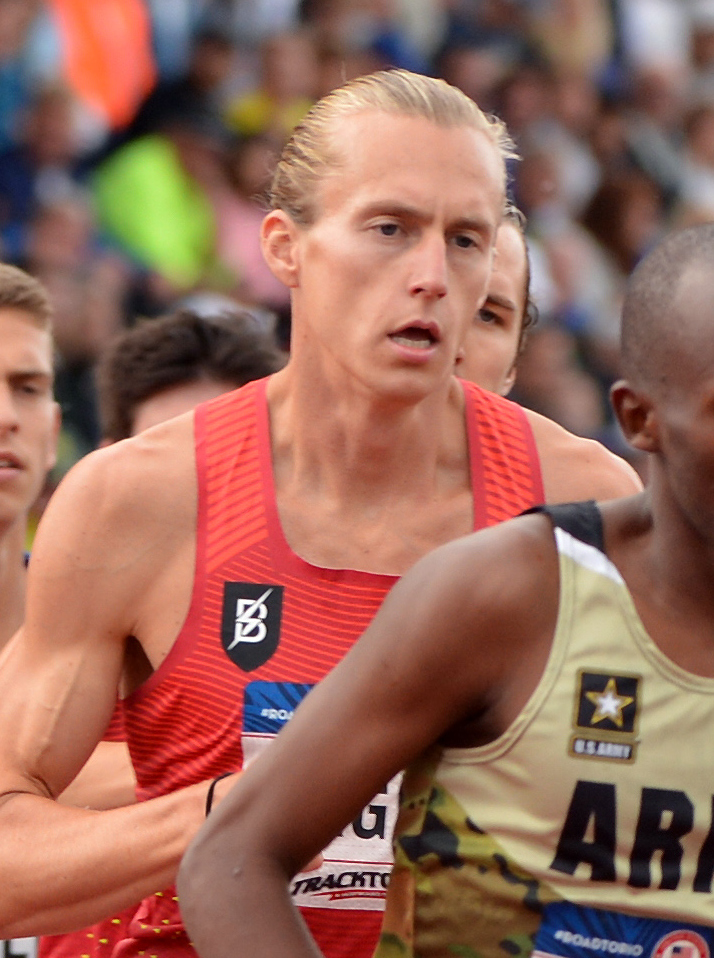
- Jager at the 2016 US Olympic Trials

Personal information
- Full name: Evan Reese Jager
- Born: March 8, 1989 (age 37) Algonquin, Illinois, U.S.
- Height: 6 ft 2 in (188 cm)
- Weight: 145 lb (66 kg)

Sport
- Country: United States
- Sport: Track and field
- Event: 3000 metres steeplechase
- College team: Wisconsin Badgers
- Club: Bowerman Track Club
- Turned pro: Sep. 2008
- Coached by: Jerry Schumacher

Achievements and titles
- Olympic finals: 2012 London; 3000 m st., 6th 2016 Rio de Janeiro; 3000 m st., Silver
- World finals: 2009 Berlin; 5000 m, 25th (h); 2013 Moscow; 3000 m st., 5th; 2015 Beijing; 3000 m st., 6th; 2017 London; 3000 m st., Bronze; 2022 Eugene; 3000 m st., 6th
- Personal bests: 1500 m: 3:32.97 (Portland 2015); Mile: 3:53.33 (Eugene 2014); 3000 m: 7:35.16 (Stockholm 2012); 5000 m: 13:02.40 (Brussels 2013); 3000 m s’chase: 8:00.45 AR (Paris 2015); Indoors; Mile: 3:55.25i (New York 2015); 3000 m: 7:38.25i (Boston 2020); 5000 m: 13:13.23i (Boston 2022)
Medal record
Men's athletics
Representing the United States
Olympic Games
Silver medal – second place	2016 Rio de Janeiro	3000 m s’chase
World Championships
Bronze medal – third place	2017 London	3000 m s’chase
Continental Cup
Silver medal – second place	2014 Marrakesh	3000 m s’chase
NACAC Championships
Gold medal – first place	2022 Freeport	3000 m s’chase

Evan Reese Jager (/ˈdʒeɪɡər/ JAY-gur; born March 8, 1989) is an American middle- and long-distance runner who specializes in the 3000 metres steeplechase. In his speciality event, he won a silver medal at the 2016 Rio Olympics and a bronze at the 2017 World Championships. Jager is the current NACAC area record holder in the event with a time of 8:00.45. He is sponsored by Nike and is coached by Jerry Schumacher of the Bowerman Track Club.

After just one year at the University of Wisconsin, Jager turned professional, relocating to Portland. He qualified for his first world championships in 2009, competing in the 5000 m. In 2012, he debuted in what would become his specialty event, the 3000 m steeplechase. In just his first year in the event he would win the US Olympic Trials, break the American record, and finish 6th at the London Olympics.

After missing the podium at the 2013 and 2015 World Championships, finishing fifth and sixth, Jager won a silver medal at the Rio de Janeiro Olympics and followed it up with a bronze at the 2017 World Championships. From 2018 to 2021, he struggled to stay healthy, but returned to form with a sixth-place finish at the 2022 World Championships.

== Running career ==
=== High school ===
Jager attended Harry D. Jacobs High School in Algonquin, Illinois, a suburb northwest of Chicago. His high school coach was Rob Piercy. In 2005, as a junior, he placed 9th at the Foot Locker Cross Country Championships in San Diego. In the same year, he lowered his personal best in the mile run to 4:08.15, winning the Midwest Distance Gala. In 2007, as a senior, he ran 8:47.59 in the 2 mile, placing 4th at the Nike Outdoor Nationals. At the same meet, he ran 4:05.68 in the mile, placing 3rd although he competed in the "B" heat.

During his high school career, he won three individual state championship titles and one relay title. In 2006, as a junior, he won the 1600 m with a time of 4:11.22 and was a part of the winning 4 × 800 m relay with a time of 7:40.02. In 2006, as a senior, he won the cross country state championships with a time of 14:07. In 2007, as a senior, he won the 3200 m with a time of 8:52.33.

=== Collegiate ===
Jager attended the University of Wisconsin-Madison, where he competed for the Wisconsin Badgers and was coached by Schumacher. He did not compete as a freshman at the 2007 NCAA Championships for Cross Country, and was NCAA Division I All-American in the DMR at 2008 Indoor Track, but in 2008, Jager placed 8th in the 1500 metres at the 2008 NCAA Outdoor Track Championships.

In the summer after his freshman year, Jager qualified to represent the United States in the 2008 IAAF World Junior Track and Field Championships by winning the 1500 m in 3:47.43 at 2008 USA Junior Outdoor Track & Field Championships June 20–22, 2008 in Jesse Owens Memorial Stadium at Ohio State University in Columbus, Ohio. He made the finals of the 1500 metres and placed 8th with 3:49.59.

That fall, Jager signed a professional contract with Nike, forfeiting his remaining NCAA eligibility. He left the University of Wisconsin and moved to Portland to continue training with Schumacher, who had been hired by Nike to be a full-time coach to professional Nike-sponsored runners. Jager enrolled in Portland State University to continue his studies.

=== Professional ===
==== Early career ====
Jager competed at his first USA Outdoor Track and Field Championships in the 5000 m, where he took the lead with 200 m to go before placing third behind his teammates Matt Tegenkamp and Chris Solinsky. By placing third, Jager earned the opportunity to represent the United States at the 2009 IAAF World Championships in Berlin. At the World Championships, Jager placed 11th in his heat of the 5000 m and did not advance to the final.

Much of Jager's first professional season was documented in the Runner's World web series "Wisconsin to Worlds," which followed the teammates' historic sweep at the USATF Championships and their European season as they prepared for the 2009 IAAF World Championships.

In early 2010, Jager experienced pain in his foot during training runs. After taking some time off, he returned to competition, but the pain persisted and culminated in a stress fracture that he received in the 1500 m final at the USATF Championships on June 25. On July 28, 2010, he had surgery to repair a fracture in the Navicular bone of his foot.

Recuperation from his surgery took time, with pool and bike workouts substituting for running. He did not do any serious running workouts until March 2011, with the remainder of that track season being an essential, gradual return to high level training rather than a season of competitive racing.

==== 2012 ====
In the spring of 2012, guided by coach Jerry Schumacher and former U.S. steeplechase champion Pascal Dobert, Jager switched to the 3000 m steeplechase. He made his debut at the Mt. SAC Relays in April 2012. He won that race in 8:26.14, a stunning time for a neophyte and close to the 8:23.1 Olympic A standard necessary for participation in the London Games. During this race, he also beat America's best steeplechaser at the time, Daniel Huling, now one of his training partners. Jager followed through on this auspicious performance by comfortably winning the 2012 U.S. Olympic Team Trials 3000 m steeplechase in 8:17.40.

On July 20, 2012, Jager broke the American record in the 3000 m steeplechase, running 8:06.81. On August 5, Jager competed in the Olympics, finishing 6th in the final. After the Olympics, on August 17, Jager ran a new personal best of 7:35 in the 3000 m at the Stockholm Diamond League meet, finishing 5th.

==== 2013 ====
Jager kicked off the 2013 indoor season at the Millrose Games two-mile, where he finished fourth in 8:14.95 to winner Bernard Lagat, who set the American record in that race. This made Jager the fourth fastest American indoor two-miler of all time. He was fifth in the New York Columbia Qualifier 5000 m, where he finished in a time of 13:33.37. Later on in the season he finished 2nd in the indoor mile at the Seattle Husky Classic in 3:56.14, where he got nipped at the line by his teammate, Andrew Bumbalough.

Jager raced sparingly during the outdoor season before the U.S. Championships. He ran 13:14.60 which was good for 2nd to Saucony's Ben True at the Payton Jordan Cardinal Invitational. He also placed second in the Oxy HP 1500 m in 3:36.34. At the Prefontaine Classic he placed 4th in a time of 8:08.6, only two seconds off his American record. He followed up these personal record performances with an easy win at the USATF Outdoor Championships 3000 m steeplechase, where he finished in 8:20.67, giving him the opportunity to represent the US at the IAAF World Championships in Moscow for the second time, and also winning him his second consecutive 3000 m steeplechase national title. During his European outdoor season, he ran a 3k in Luzern which was his only race between USAs and Worlds. Jager went into Worlds wanting to improve on his 6th place in the London Olympics. He won his qualifying round of the Steeplechase in Moscow in what seemed to be an easy effort. He went on to place fifth in the final, getting out-leaned by Kenya's Paul Koech. Although he only improved one place from the 2012 Olympics, he put himself in the race and was there with 400 meters to go, with the gap to 6th place being about 3 to 4 seconds. To round out his 2013 season, he raced the 5000 m at the Brussels Diamond League Meet, lowering his personal best by 12 seconds, to 13:02.40.

==== 2014 ====
To kick off the 2014 outdoor season at the Prefontaine Classic, Jager ran a personal best of 3:53.33 to place him 3rd in the Men's International Mile. Only a few weeks later in Oslo, Jager was less than 2 tenths of a second off of breaking his own American 3000 m steeplechase record of 8:06.8 by running an 8:06.97. On June 29, 2014, Evan Jager won the USA 3,000 Meters Steeplechase Title by running 8:19.83.

==== 2015 ====
On June 27, Jager won the steeplechase at the 2015 USA Outdoor Track and Field Championships in 95 degree temperature in Eugene, Oregon. On July 4, Evan lowered the American Record in the steeplechase to 8:00.45 in 2015 Paris Meeting Areva Diamond League, despite falling over the final barrier.

Jager placed 6th in 2015 World Championships in Athletics – Men's 3000 metres steeplechase.

==== 2016 ====
Jager won steeplechase in a time of 8:22.48 at the 2016 United States Olympic Trials ahead of teammates Hillary Bor and Donn Cabral to qualify for the 2016 Summer Olympics.

On August 17 Jager won the silver medal at the 2016 Olympics behind Conseslus Kipruto of Kenya with a time of 8:04.28.

==== 2017 ====
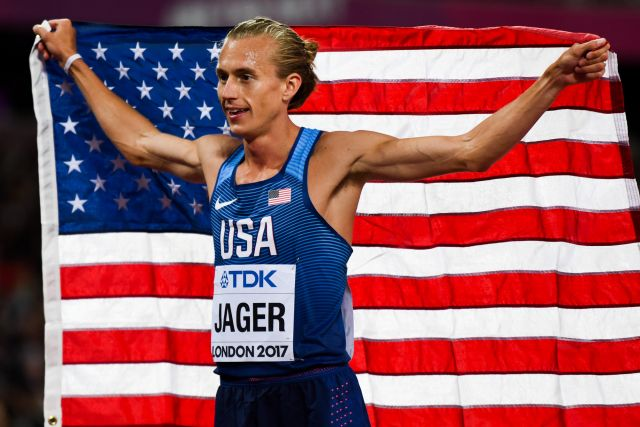
Jager after taking third at the 2017 World Championships in Athletics

At the 2017 World Championships in London on August 8, 2017, Evan placed 3rd in the 3000 m Steeplechase in a time of 8:15.53. The race started out slow for the first kilometer in 2:51.81, then soon after Jager took the lead and held on to it, until 300 m remaining where he was passed, first by Conseslus Kipruto (1st) and then Soufiane El Bakkali (2nd). Jager managed to hold on for third with Mahiedine Mekhissi-Benabbad close behind

==== 2022 ====
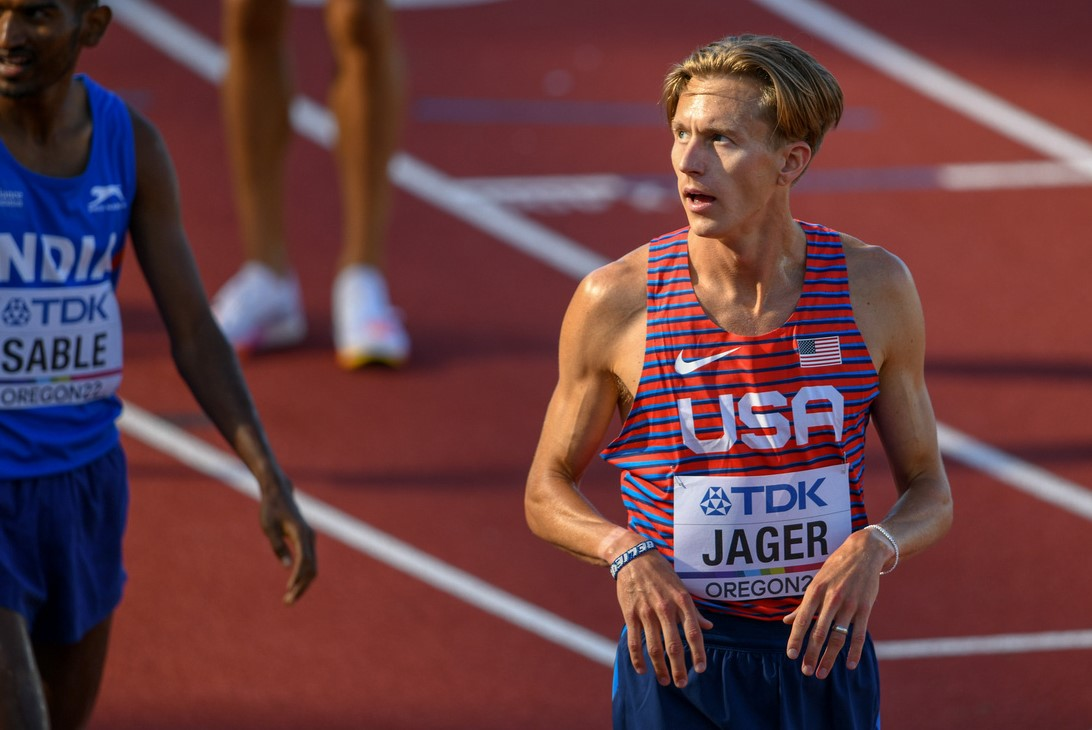
Jager at the 2022 World Athletics Championships

Jager suffered a stress fracture in 2018, and was unsure whether he would ever return to elite competition. However, five years after his last world championships appearance, Jager returned to international competition, placing sixth in the 3000m steeplechase at the 2022 World Athletics Championships held in Eugene, Oregon.

==== 2023 ====
Jager ran only four races in 2023, as he sat out most of the outdoor season due to a foot injury.

==== 2024 ====
In a bid to make his third Olympic appearance, 35-year-old Jager competed in the 3000m steeplechase at the 2024 United States Olympic trials. He placed fourth, one spot out of Olympic qualification.

== Competition record ==
=== International competitions ===
Representing the United States
Year	Competition	Venue	Position	Event	Time
2008	World Junior Championships	Bydgoszcz, Poland	8th	1500 m	3:49.59
2009	World Championships	Berlin, Germany	25th (h)	5000 m	13:39.80
2012	Olympic Games	London, United Kingdom	6th	3000 m s'chase	8:23.87
2013	World Championships	Moscow, Russia	5th	3000 m s'chase	8:08.67
2014	Continental Cup	Marrakesh, Morocco	2nd	3000 m s'chase	8:14.08
2015	World Championships	Beijing, China	6th	3000 m s'chase	8:15.47
2016	Olympic Games	Rio de Janeiro, Brazil	2nd	3000 m s'chase	8:04.28
2017	World Championships	London, United Kingdom	3rd	3000 m s'chase	8:15.53
2022	World Championships	Eugene, United States	6th	3000 m s'chase	8:29.08
2022	NACAC Championships	Freeport, Bahamas	1st	3000 m s'chase	8:22.55

=== USA National Championships ===
Year	Competition	Venue	Position	Event	Time
2009	USA Outdoor T&F Championships	Eugene, Oregon	3rd	5000 m	13:22.18 PB
2012	US Olympic Trials	Eugene, Oregon	1st	3000 m s'chase	8:17.40 PB
2013	USA Outdoor T&F Championships	Des Moines, Iowa	1st	3000 m s'chase	8:20.67
2014	USA Outdoor T&F Championships	Sacramento, California	1st	3000 m s'chase	8:18.83
2015	USA Outdoor T&F Championships	Eugene, Oregon	1st	3000 m s'chase	8:12.29 CR
2016	US Olympic Trials	Eugene, Oregon	1st	3000 m s'chase	8:22.48
2017	USA Outdoor T&F Championships	Sacramento, California	1st	3000 m s'chase	8:16.88 SB
2018	USA Outdoor T&F Championships	Des Moines, Iowa	1st	3000 m s'chase	8:20.10
2022	USA Outdoor T&F Championships	Eugene, Oregon	2nd	3000 m s'chase	8:17.29 SB
2024	US Olympic Trials	Eugene, Oregon	4th	3000 m s'chase	8:28.73
