= Jerry Schumacher =

American track and field coach (born 1970)

- Born: August 6, 1970 (age 56)
- Education: University of Wisconsin-Madison
- Occupations: Coach for track and field and cross country running
- Years active: 1997–present
- Employers: University of Wisconsin - Madison; Nike Oregon Project; Bowerman Track Club; University of Oregon

Jerry Schumacher (born August 6, 1970) is an American coach for track and field and cross country. Since 2022, he has been the head coach of the University of Oregon's track and field and cross country programs. He has also served as the head coach for the Bowerman Track Club, where he has coached several high profile athletes. Before his tenure at the Bowerman Track Club, he was the head coach at the University of Wisconsin-Madison.

== Coaching ==
Schumacher began his coaching career as an assistant coach at the University of North Carolina in 1997. The following year, at age 28, he accepted a job offer from the University of Wisconsin-Madison. Under his direction, the program won two NCAA titles. In June 2008, Schumacher moved to the Nike Oregon Project. In 2014, Schumacher became the head coach of the Bowerman Track Club, a Nike-sponsored group based in Eugene, Oregon. He coached numerous Olympians while at Bowerman, including Mohammed Ahmed, Grant Fisher, Evan Jager, and Elise Cranny. In July 2022, the University of Oregon appointed Schumacher as the head coach for its cross country and track teams. He retained his position as the coach of the Bowerman Track Club, coaching both collegiate and professional athletes simultaneously. According to the Oregonian, Schumacher's seven-year contract with the University of Oregon amounted to $3.4 million.

== Personal ==
Schumacher competed collegiately for the University of Wisconsin-Madison, where he specialized in the 1500 metres. He set a personal best of 3:39.46 in the event in 1993. Schumacher is the father of 4 children.
