= Joe Klecker =

American distance runner

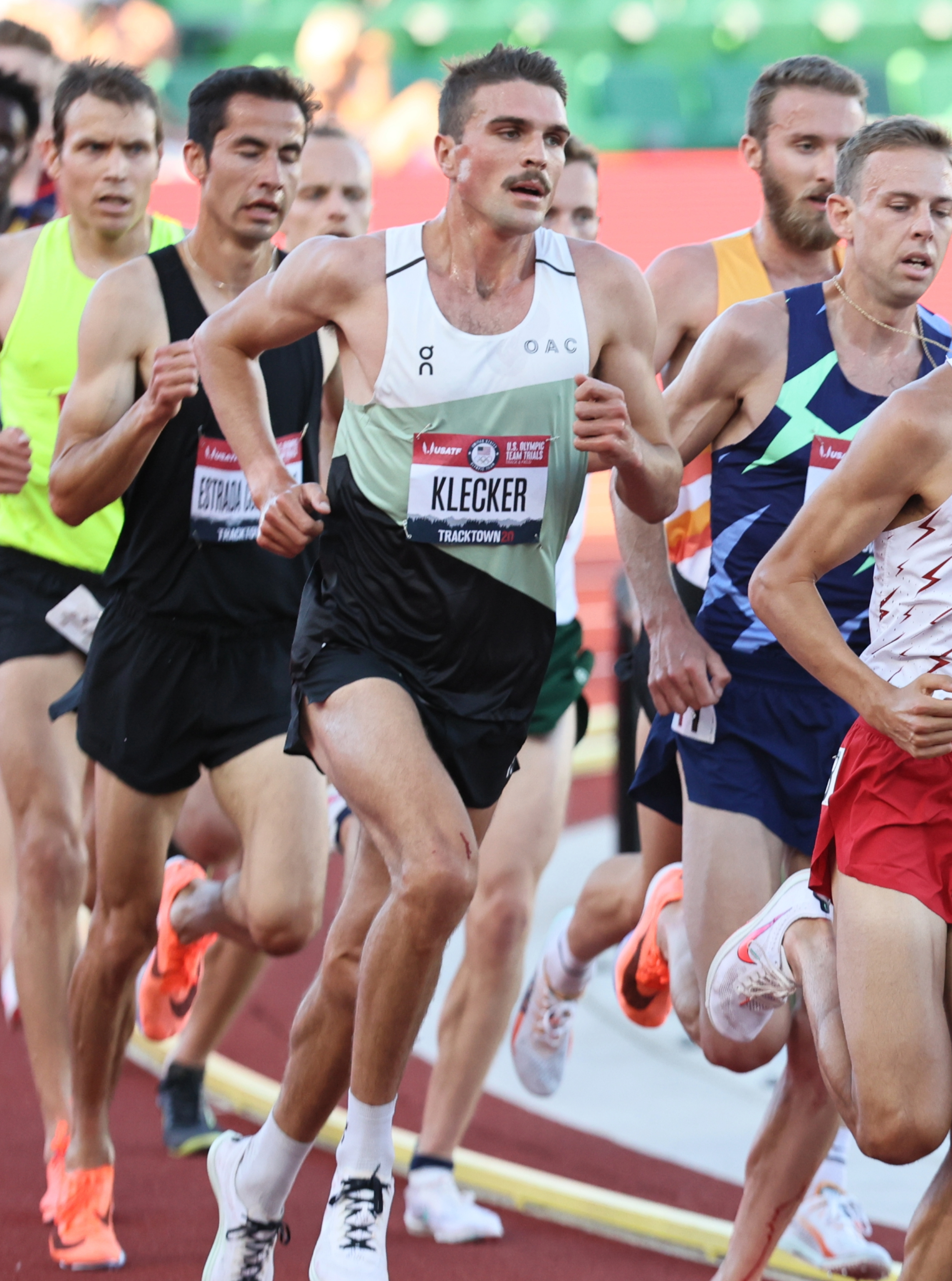
- Klecker at the 2020 US Olympic Trials

Personal information
- Born: November 16, 1996 (age 29) Minneapolis, Minnesota, United States
- Education: University of Colorado
- Height: 6 ft 0 in (183 cm)
- Spouse: Sage Hurta-Klecker

Sport
- Sport: Track, cross country
- Events: 5000 m, 10,000 m
- College team: Colorado Buffaloes
- Club: On Athletics Club
- Turned pro: 2020
- Coached by: Dathan Ritzenhein

Achievements and titles
- Olympic finals: 2020; 10,000 m, 15th
- World finals: 2022; 10,000 m, 9th 2023; 10,000 m, 20th
- Personal bests: Outdoor; 1500m: 3:37.00 (Portland 2021); 3,000m: 7:39.18 (Phoenix 2021); 2 miles: 8:11.55 (Eugene 2021); 5000m: 12:55.16 (Florence 2023); 10,000m: 27:07.57 (San Juan Capistrano 2023); Indoor; One Mile: 4:01.72i (Boulder 2017); 3000m: 7:34.14 (New York City 2023); 2 miles: 8:14.20i (New York City 2021); 5000m: 12:54.99i (Boston 2023); Road; Half marathon: 1:01:06 (Houston 2025); Marathon: 2:05:56 (Boston 2026)

Joe Klecker (born November 16, 1996) is an American long-distance runner. After a successful collegiate career with the Colorado Buffaloes he turned professional in 2020 joining the On Athletics Club coached by Dathan Ritzenhein. Klecker is an Olympian and holds personal bests of 3:37.00 for 1500m, 7:34.14 for 3000m, 12:54.99 for 5000m, and 27:07.57 for 10000m, all set as a part of the On Athletics Club.

Klecker attended Hopkins High School in Minnetonka, Minnesota. He graduated in 2015 and attended the University of Colorado in the Fall. At Colorado, he was a 9-time All-American in all 3 running sports including 2 runner-up finishes. He is currently the school's record holder in the indoor 5000m.

== Personal and early life ==
Joe is the son of Barney and Janis Klecker, both professional marathoners (winners of Grandma's Marathon and Twin Cities Marathon in Minnesota) and both US national record holders, in the 50-mile and 50K run, respectively.

In 2022, Klecker married fellow University of Colorado alum and On Athletics Club teammate Sage Hurta.

Klecker had a successful high school career, leading to two individual state championships his senior year. He was also named the Gatorade Minnesota Boys Track & Field Athlete of the Year during his senior year. Klecker set a 1600m state record of 4:06.54. He considered Minnesota, Furman, Georgetown and Tulsa before choosing Colorado.

== Collegiate career ==
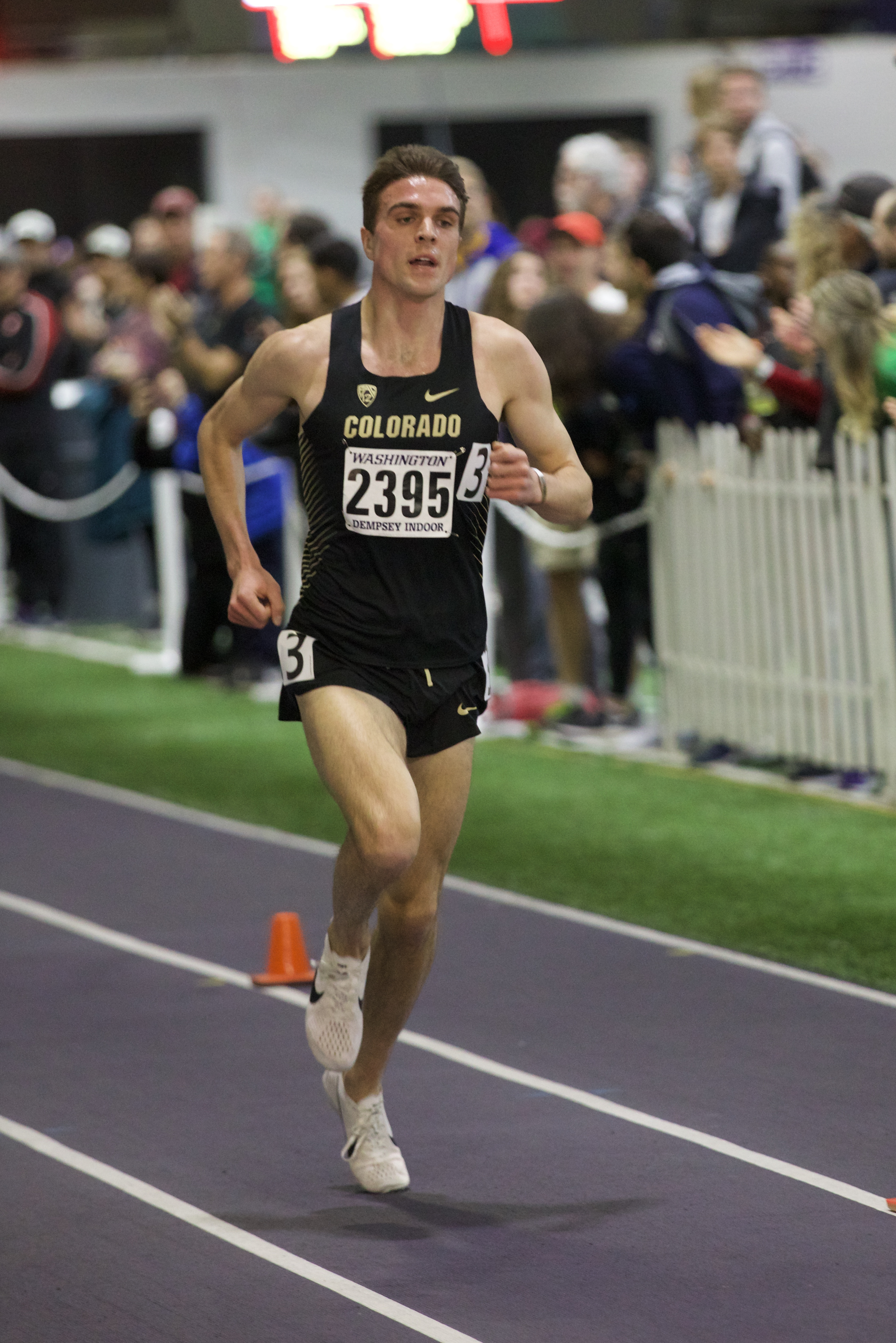
Klecker competes in the NCAA in 2020 for the Colorado Buffaloes.

=== 2015–16 ===
Klecker chose to redshirt his Freshman season of Cross Country but competed in indoor and outdoor track, setting PRs of 3:44.55 for 1500m, 7:59.77 for 3000m, and 13:44.23 for 5000m. The 5000m time was good enough to qualify him for the West Preliminary round, the outdoor qualifier for the NCAA DI Championships.

=== 2016–17 ===
Klecker picked up his first all-american honors at the 2016 NCAA DI XC Championships, placing 28th. He ran track PRs of 7:51.43 for 3000m, 13:42.64 for 5000m, and 3:41.69 for 1500m. Klecker placed 4th at the 2017 NCAA DI Indoor Track and Field Championship in the 3000m, and 7th in the Outdoor Championships for 5000m.

=== 2017–18 ===
Klecker won the NCAA Mountain region championships and placed 2nd at the Pac-12 Championship for Cross country. Klecker did not repeat his All-American status his Junior year of cross country, placing 67th at the championship race. He did not race indoor or outdoor track for Colorado the following winter and spring. Klecker ran a PR in the 5000m in June 2018, with a time of 13:30.09.

=== 2018–19 ===
In 2018, Klecker repeated as the Mountain Region Champion, and placed 8th in the NCAA XC Championships, his first time in the top 10. On February 23, 2019, he ran 3:58.51 in the Mile in Seattle, WA. In doing so, he became the 538th American to break 4 minutes in the Mile. He finished 2nd in the NCAA Indoor 5000m to Morgan McDonald and 3rd in the 3000m to McDonald and Grant Fisher. He did not race in the outdoor championships due to a mid-season injury.

=== 2019–2020 ===
During his 2019 XC campaign, Klecker won the Pac-12 Championships. At the NCAA Championships, he finished 2nd to Edwin Kurgat, leading Colorado to a 3rd-place team finish. Klecker went on to run a 3000m personal record of 7:47.57, but the indoor championships were cancelled due to the COVID-19 pandemic as well as the entire outdoor season.

== Professional career ==
=== 2020–2021 ===
In August 2020, Klecker became a professional runner for On Athletics Club, a newly formed group mostly composed of recent collegiate runners including Oliver Hoare and Alicia Monson. The group is coached by Dathan Ritzenhein. Under Ritzenhein, Klecker ran personal bests of 3:37.55 for 1500m, 13:28.98 for 5000m and 27:35.57 during the second half of 2020. On February 6, 2021, Klecker opened his season at the Prickly Pear Invitational in Phoenix, AZ. He placed fourth to Bowerman Track Club teammates Marc Scott, Grant Fisher, and Sean McGorty. Klecker's time of 7:39.18 was a personal record and his first time under 7:40. One week later, he competed in the New Balance Indoor Grand Prix in New York, NY. He finished 2nd to Justyn Knight in the 2-mile with a time of 8:14.20. His 3000m split en-route was 7:44.91, good for an indoor personal best. On March 6, 2021, he ran a 22-second personal best of 13:06.67 for 5000m at the Sound Running Invite in California. This performance earned him fourth place (again behind Bowerman teammates Fisher, Scott, and McGorty) in the race and made him the 18th fastest American ever over the distance.

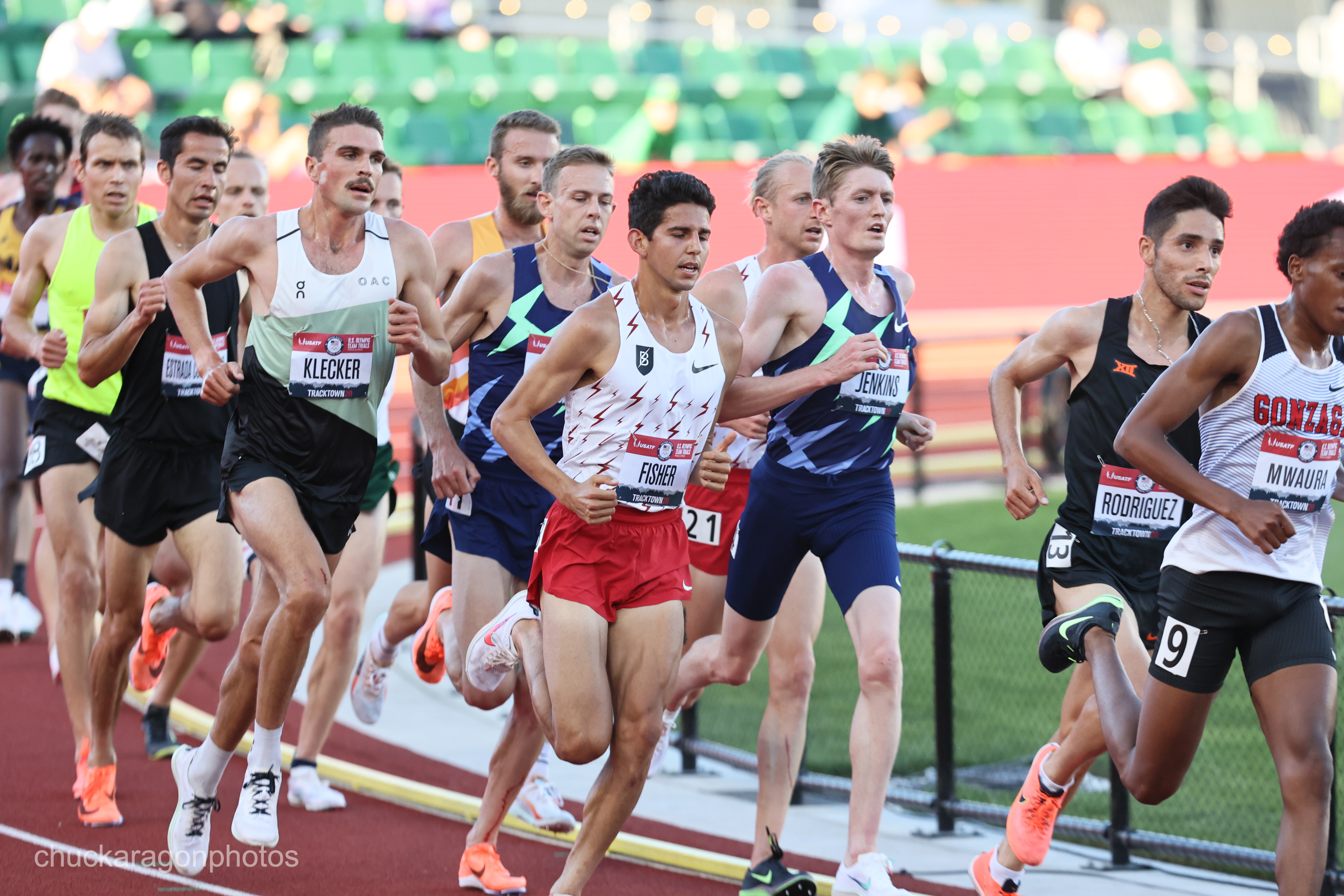
Klecker (left of center) during the race.

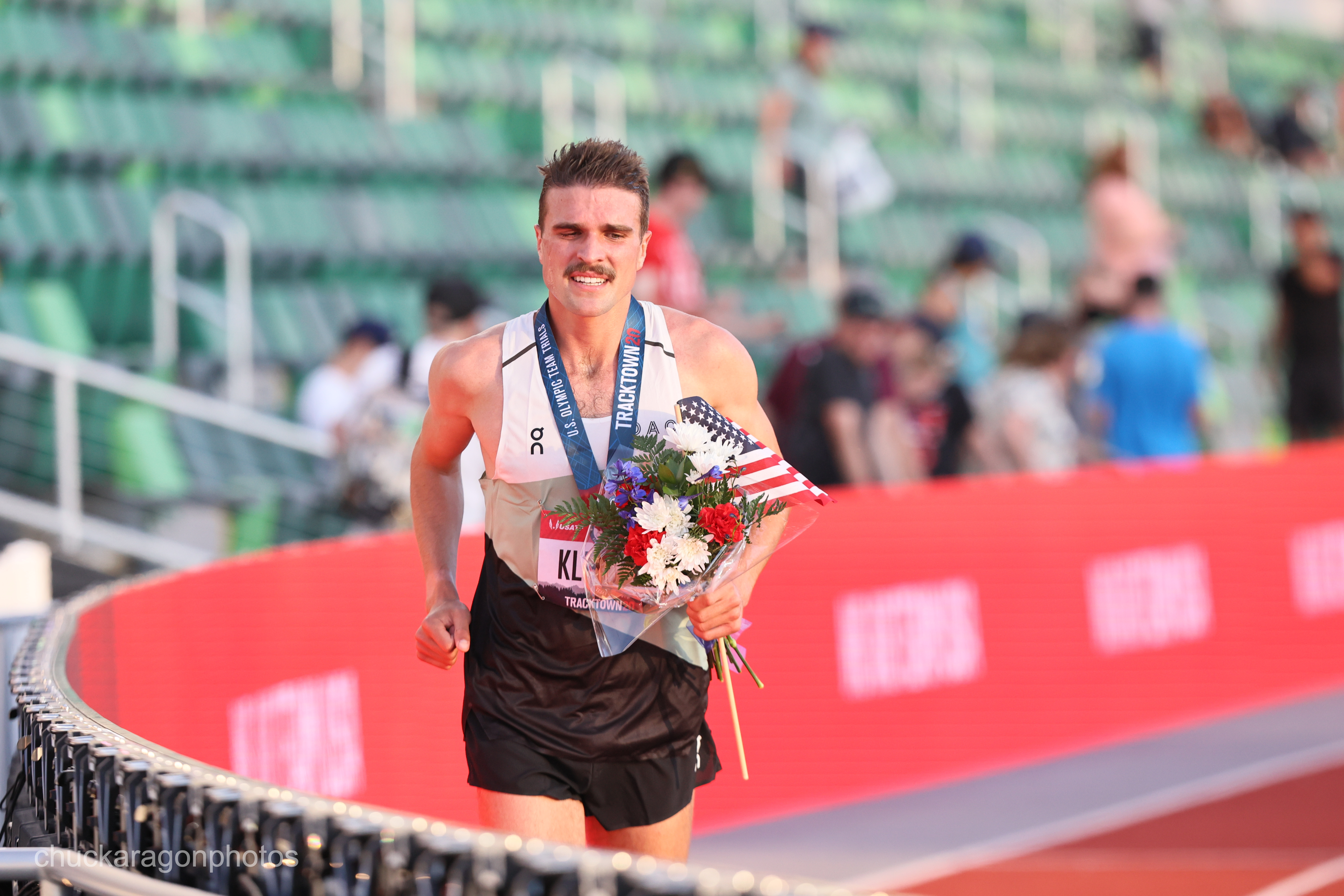
Klecker celebrates after finishing third.

Joe Klecker at the 10,000 metres of the 2020 US Olympic Trials.

He ran a 10,000 m personal best of 27:23.44 in Irvine, California on May 14, 2021. Klecker made his first Olympic team on June 18, 2021, at the U.S. Olympic Trials. He finished 3rd in the 10,000m running 27:54.90 with a final lap of 54.54 behind Bowerman athletes Woody Kincaid and Grant Fisher. He became the first U.S. athlete with the "On Athletics Club," coached by Dathan Ritzenhein to make the Olympic team. At the 2020 Olympic Games, Klecker finished 16th in the men's 10,000m final with a time of 28:14.18. After the Olympics, he set a personal best of 8:11.55 in the 2 Mile at the Prefontaine Classic. He finished 11th at the Fifth Avenue Mile.

=== 2022 ===
On May 29, 2022, he won the U.S. championship 10000m. With a final lap of 54.81, Klecker finished in 28.28.71, qualifying for the U.S. Team at the World Athletic Championships and edging new American record holder Grant Fisher. Fisher had set an American Record of 26:33.84 in March. On July 16, 2022, again at Hayward Field in Eugene at the WAC, Klecker ran with the leaders for over 23 laps, a tactical race, finishing 8th in 27:37.73, behind the winner Joshua Cheptegei. In that race, Fisher took fourth in 27:28.14, just a quarter second behind the silver medalist.

=== 2023 ===
On January 27, 2023 Klecker broke the 13 minute barrier in the 5K, running 12:54.99 at the John Thomas Terrier Classic held at Boston University. He finished second in the race to Woody Kincaid, who broke the American record in 12:51.61. Klecker was paced for just over two miles by teammate Ollie Hoare and led after Hoare stepped off the track. He was able to gap Kincaid by over a second heading into the final lap, but Kincaid closed in a fast 26.27 seconds for his final 200m while Klecker could only manage a 31.03. Klecker's time was good for 7th fastest ever in the world indoors and 3rd fastest American indoors. He became the 11th American to break 13 minutes in the 5K. Two weeks later, Klecker finished 3rd place at the Millrose Games in New York City at the Armory. His time of 7:34.14 was a personal record and ranks him 4th on the all-time American indoor list.

Klecker placed 4th at the Diamond League 5000m in Oslo on June 15, with a time of 12:56.59. At the 2023 USA Outdoor Track and Field Championships in July, Klecker ran the 10,000 and 5,000 with the top 3 in each event being selected to the US team for the World Athletics Championship. Klecker placed 2nd in the 10,000 to Kincaid, running 28:24.50 with a 56.88 final 400m. He missed the 5000m team, qualifying for the final but placing 4th, one place out of qualification in 13:25.98. At the 2023 World Athletics Championships held in Budapest in August, Klecker placed 20th in the 10,000m final with a time of 29:03. This was a poor showing by Klecker's standards, given he was closer to last place (29:10) than 19th (28:50) and he had placed in the top 10 the prior year.

=== 2024 ===
Klecker opened his 2024 season on January 26 running a 5000 m at the Boston University John Thomas Terrier Classic with the goal of hitting the Olympic standard of 13:05.00. Disappointingly, he finished just shy of that mark, running a time of 13:06.02, 11.03 seconds slower than he had at the same meet a year prior. A similarly unfortunate outcome awaited Klecker at the Millrose Games 2-mile, his second race of the year. He finished in 9th, over 20 seconds back of 1st place finisher Josh Kerr and almost 10 seconds back of his personal best. On March 16, Joe competed at the TEN in San Juan Capistrano running 27:09.29 over 10,000 m, missing the Olympic standard of 27:00.00. Despite not achieving the mark, he stated he was happy with the result saying he had only been running 30 miles in recent weeks due to adductor strain and a stress reaction in his pelvis. Ultimately, the injuries significantly disrupted Klecker's training and he did not contest the 2024 U.S. Olympic trials.

=== 2025 ===
Klecker made his half marathon debut at Houston Half Marathon, running 1:01:06 for 18th place. He raced in the USA Half Marathon Championships on March 2 in Atlanta, finishing in 8th place in 1:01:34. This was not good enough to be automatically selected for the World Championship team, where the top 3 earned slots.

== Competition record ==
Representing the United States
Year	Competition	Venue	Position	Event	Time
2021	Olympic Games	Tokyo, Japan	16th	10,000 m	28:14.18
2022	World Championships	Eugene, United States	9th	10,000 m	27:38.73
2023	World Championships	Budapest, Hungary	20th	10,000 m	29:03.41
2026	Boston Marathon	Boston, United States	13th	Marathon	2:05:56

Representing the Colorado Buffaloes (2018) and the OAC (2021–present)
Year	Competition	Venue	Position	Event	Time
2018	USATF Championships	Des Moines, Iowa	9th	5000 m	13:41.65
2021	US Olympic Trials	Eugene, Oregon	3rd	10,000 m	27:54.90
2022	USATF Championships	Eugene, Oregon	1st	10,000 m	28:28.71
2023	USATF Championships	Eugene, Oregon	4th	5000 m	13:26.94
2023	USATF Championships	Eugene, Oregon	2nd	10,000 m	28:24.50
