= Sage Hurta-Klecker =

American middle-distance runner

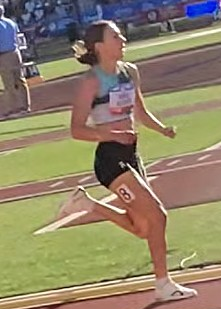
- Hurta-Klecker at the 2024 United States Olympic trials

Personal information
- Nationality: American
- Born: Sage Hurta; 23 June 1998 (age 28) Buffalo, USA
- Home town: Hamilton (village), New York, USA
- Education: University of Colorado Boulder
- Employer: On Running
- Height: 5 ft 9 in (175 cm)
- Spouse: Joe Klecker

Sport
- Country: United States
- Sport: Athletics
- Events: 1500 metres, 800 metres
- University team: Colorado Buffaloes
- Club: On Athletics Club
- Turned pro: 2021
- Coached by: Dathan Ritzenhein; Aug 2021–present

Achievements and titles
- World finals: 2025; 800 m, 5th
- Personal bests: 800 m: 1:55.89 (Tokyo, 2025)
Medal record
Women's athletics
Representing the United States
NCAA Outdoor Championships
Silver medal – second place	2021 Eugene	1500 m
NCAA Indoor Championships
Gold medal – first place	2021 Fayetteville	Mile
Gold medal – first place	2017 College Station	Distance Medley Relay
NCAA Cross Country Championships
Gold medal – first place	2018 Madison	Team title
Bronze medal – third place	2017 Louisville	Team Bronze
Bronze medal – third place	2016 Terre Haute	Team Bronze

Sage Alexandra Hurta-Klecker (née Hurta) (born 23 June 1998) is an American middle-distance runner competing primarily in the 800 metres and the 1500 metres. She is currently the third-fastest all-time American woman in the 800 meters.

Hurta-Klecker is a member of On Athletics Club, coached by former professional runner Dathan Ritzenhein, and is based in Boulder, Colorado.

== Early life ==
Hurta-Klecker was born in Buffalo, New York to parents Gary and Amy Hurta of Hamilton, New York. She was brought up in Hamilton, attending Hamilton Central school from kindergarten to 12th grade where she competed on a national level. Both her parents attended Cornell University where Amy Hurta competed for the cross country and track teams, with Gary on the track team alongside her. She has previously stated that her parents were responsible for her initial interest in running.
Hurta-Klecker placed 2nd in the 800 meter final in 2:06.37 at the 2016 New Balance Outdoor Nationals alongside a 2nd in the mile in 4:47.75, 3rd in the mile in 4:56.17 at the 2015 New Balance Indoor Nationals, 3rd in the mile in 4:56.50 at the 2014 New Balance Outdoor Nationals, and winning the 800 meters in 2:12.78 at the 2012 New Balance Outdoor Nationals.

== Collegiate career ==
She competed collegiately for the University of Colorado, Boulder where she became an indoor NCAA mile champion. She also became just the second woman in the history of the university to achieve NCAA Division I All-America status in the mile.

== Statistics ==
=== Circuit performances ===
Grand Slam Track results
Slam	Race group	Event	Pl.	Time	Prize money
2025 Kingston Slam	Short distance	800 m	4th	1:59.26	US$20,000
2025 Kingston Slam	Short distance	1500 m	6th	4:10.16	US$20,000

=== Personal bests ===
Outdoor

- 400 metres — 54.78 (Boulder, CO 2024)
- 800 metres — 1:55.89 (Tokyo, Japan 2025)
- 1500 metres — 4:01.79 (Memphis, TN 2022)
- One mile — 4:19.89 (Raleigh, NC 2024)

Indoor

- 800 metres — 1:58.78 (Winston-Salem, NC 2026)
- 1500 metres — 4:06.43 (New York, NY 2022)
- One mile — 4:25.45 (New York, NY 2022)

=== National championships ===
Year	Competition	Venue	Position	Event	Notes
2025	USA Outdoor Track and Field Championships	Eugene, Oregon	3rd	800 m	1:59.48
2024	USA Olympic Trials	Eugene, Oregon	5th	800 m	2:00.38
2023	USA Outdoor Track and Field Championships	Eugene, Oregon	4th	800 m	2:01.19
2022	USA Outdoor Track and Field Championships	Eugene, Oregon	7th	800 m	1:59.43
2021	USA Olympic trials	Eugene, Oregon	16th	800 m	DNF
2018	USA Outdoor Track and Field Championships	Des Moines, Iowa	18th	3000 m steeplechase	10:08.77
2015	USA World U18 trials	Lisle, Illinois	4th	800 m	2:11.99
2015	USA World U18 trials	Lisle, Illinois	3rd	1500 m	4:39.84
