= Carmela Cardama Báez =

Spanish long-distance runner

Personal information
- Born: 4 December 1996 (age 29) Vigo, Spain
- Employer: On

Sport
- Event(s): 5000 metres, 10000 metres
- University team: Oregon Ducks (2017-2021) Florida State Seminoles (2015-2017)
- Club: On Athletics Club (2021-2024)
- Turned pro: 2021
- Coached by: Dathan Ritzenhein (2021-2024)

Achievements and titles
- Personal bests: Outdoor; 3000 m: 9:01.67 (Seattle 2020); 5000 m: 15:31.40 (Austin 2021); 10000 m: 32:16.13 (Eugene 2021); Indoor; 3000 m: 9:18.20i (Boston 2017); 5000 m: 15:25.41i (Boston 2019)
Medal record
Women's track and field
Representing Spain
European Junior Championships
Bronze medal – third place	Eskilstuna 2015	5000 m

Carmela Cardama Báez (born 4 December 1996) is a Spanish long-distance runner. She won the 2021 NCAA 10,000 m championship competing for the Oregon Ducks. From 2021 to 2024, she was a part of the On Athletics Club.

== Early and personal life ==
Cardama Báez was born 4 December 1996 in Vigo, Spain.

In March 2014, Cardama Báez placed first at the Spanish Junior Indoor Championships over 3000 m. In December, she competed at the 2014 European Cross Country Championships in Samokov, finishing 40th in the U20 race.

In 2015, Cardama Báez won the Spanish junior titles over 3000 and 5000 metres. Later that year, she represented Spain at the European Junior Championships in Sweden, taking bronze in the 5000 m.

== Collegiate ==
=== Florida State (2015–2017) ===
In the fall of 2015, Cardama Báez enrolled at Florida State University to compete for the Florida State Seminoles.

She made her NCAA debut on 4 September, finishing third at the Covered Bridge Open in Boone, North Carolina. She would end her first NCAA cross country season finishing ninth at the ACC Championships and eleventh at the South Regional.

In June 2016, Cardama Báez won the Spanish U23 Championship in the 5000 m and represented Spain at the Mediterranean U23 Championships in Tunis, finishing fourth.

During the 2016 cross country season, Carmela would improve her position at the ACC Championships and South Regional placing seventh and third respectively. This qualified her for the national meet in Terre Haute, Indiana where she finished 73rd.

Cardama Baez would go on to place fourth at the 2017 ACC Championships indoors and out, running a 16:07.49 personal best in the former.

=== Oregon (2017–2021) ===
For the 2017 cross country season, Cardama Báez transferred to the University of Oregon to compete for the Oregon Ducks. She debuted for Oregon on 29 September 2017 placing twelfth at the Dellinger Invitational. At the Pac-12 Championships on 27 October, she placed 23rd and went on to finish 34th at the NCAA championships.

Indoors, in 2018, Cardama Báez ran personal bests over 3000 m (9:23.48) and 5000 m (15:55.00). Outdoors, she would make her debut over 10000 m, running 33:36.73 at the Stanford Invitational and finishing fourth at the Pac-12 Championships a month later in 33:24.39.

In fall 2018, Carmela would improve upon her previous performances to finish 8th at the Pac-12 cross-country championship and 31st at the national meet. On 9 December, she placed 8th at the European Cross Country Championships in the U23 race.

Cardama Báez opened her 2019 track season with a 32:55.50 personal best over 10000 m at the Stanford Invitational. A month later at the Stanford Payton Jordan Invitational, she would run a 15:38.77 5000 m personal best in the 5000 m. She qualified for nationals in both events but chose to just contest the 10000 m at the championship. In Austin, at the 2019 NCAA Division I Outdoor Track and Field Championships, she would place second, to New Mexico's Weini Kelati. A month later, she competed at the European 10,000 m Cup in London, running a 32:26.43 personal best and finishing sixth.

On 7 December, Carmela set a Spanish indoor 5000 m record of 15:25.41 in Boston, setting a 13-second personal best in the process.

On 14 May 2021, Cardama Báez won the Pac-12 10000 m title in Los Angeles beating the field by over 10 seconds. The next month at the NCAA Championships in Eugene, she won her first NCAA title, running a 32:16.13 personal best in the process.

== Professional ==
After her win at the 2021 NCAA Championships, Cardama Báez turned professional, joining the On Athletics Club based in Boulder, Colorado and coached by Dathan Ritzenhein.

On 21 December 2021, Cardama Báez competed in the senior race at the European Cross Country Championships in Dublin, finishing eighth.

On 14 June 2022, she ran 9:08.11 over 3000 m, a personal best, in Bern, Switzerland. 2 weeks later she placed fourth at the Spanish Championships over 5000 m in 16:14.37.

On 31 March 2024, Cardama Báez announced she was leaving the On Athletics Club.

== Competition record ==
Representing Spain
Year	Competition	Venue	Position	Event	Time
2014	European Cross Country Championships	Samokov, Bulgaria	40th	U20 Race	15:36
2015	European Junior Championships	Eskilstuna, Sweden	3rd	5000 m	16:23.81
2017	European Cross Country Championships	Samorin, Slovakia	18th	U23 Race	21:40
2018	European Cross Country Championships	Tilburg, Netherlands	8th	U23 Race	21:04
2021	European Cross Country Championships	Dublin, Ireland	8th	Senior Race	27:41
