= Olli Hoare =

Australian middle-distance runner

Oliver Hoare
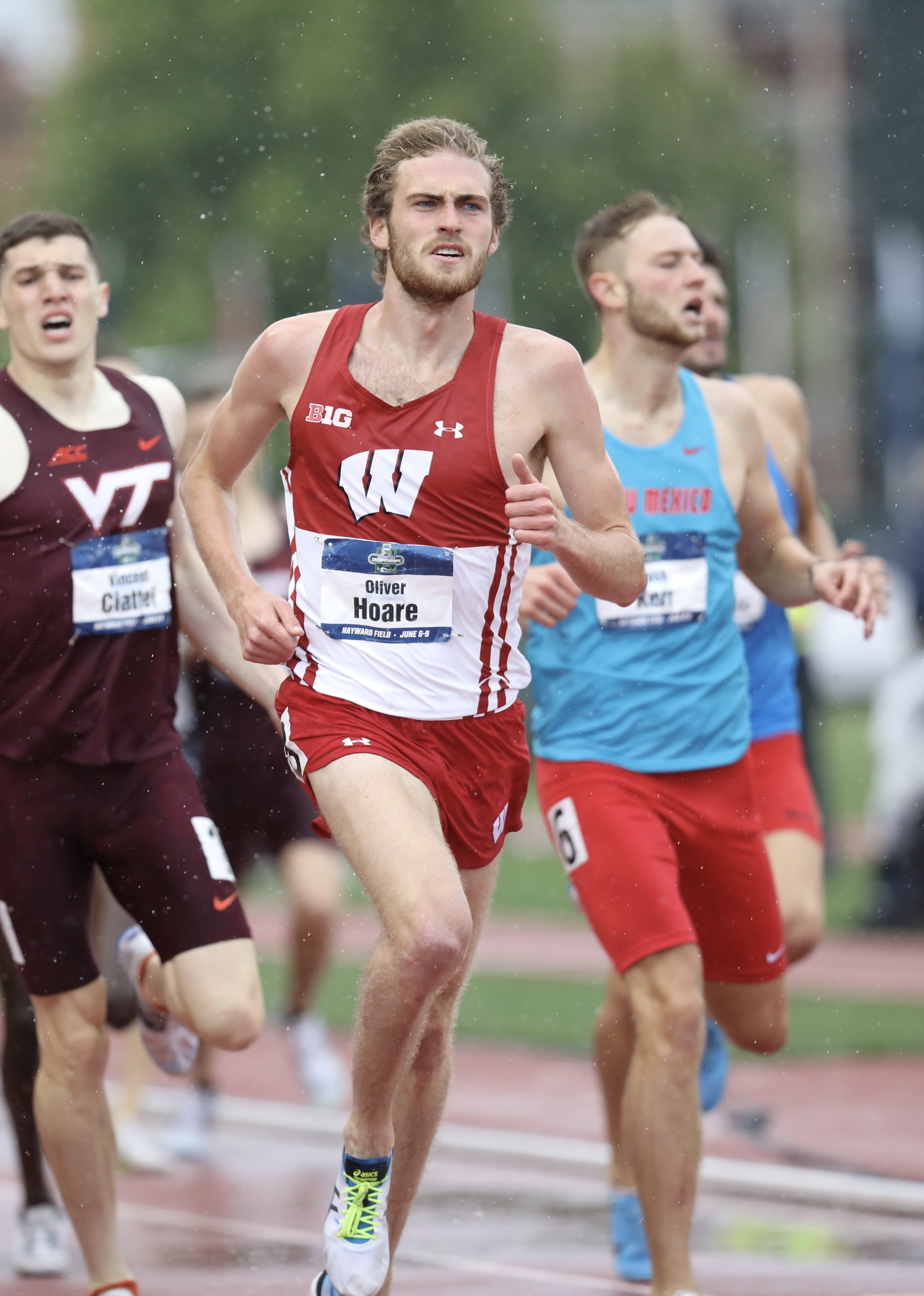
- Hoare at the 2018 NCAA Division I Outdoor T&F Championships

Personal information
- Nickname: Olli
- Born: 29 January 1997 (age 29) Sydney, Australia
- Height: 1.87 m (6 ft 2 in)

Sport
- Country: Australia
- Sport: Athletics
- Event: 1500 metres
- University team: Wisconsin
- Club: On Athletics Club
- Coached by: Dathan Ritzenhein

Achievements and titles
- Personal bests: Outdoors; 1500 m: 3:29.41 AR (Oslo 2023); Mile: 3:47.48 AR (Oslo 2022); 3000 m: 8:09.93 (Melbourne 2015); 5000 m: 13:22.16 (San Juan Capistrano 2021); Indoors; 800 m: 1:49.96i (Bloomington 2020); 1500 m: 3:32.35i AR (New York 2021); 3000 m: 7:45.42i (Boston 2025); 5000 m: 13:09.96i AR (Boston 2021)
Medal record
Men's athletics
Representing Australia
Commonwealth Games
Gold medal – first place	2022 Birmingham	1500 m
World Cross Country Championships
Gold medal – first place	2026 Tallahassee	Mixed relay
Bronze medal – third place	2023 Bathurst	Mixed relay
World Road Running Championships
Silver medal – second place	2026 Copenhagen	Mile mixed team

Oliver Hoare (born 29 January 1997) is an Australian middle-distance runner who primarily competes in the 1500 metres. He notably won the 1500 m at the 2022 Commonwealth Games in a Games record of 3:30.12. Hoare also competed for Australia at the 2024 Summer Olympics.

== Career ==
=== Early years ===
Hoare's grandfather, World War II veteran Sergeant Fred Hoare, was a member of his local athletics club, and the reason for his father's and Hoare's own love of athletics.

His father Greg was a track runner and a dual world beach-running champion, and Hoare took up the same activities. Hoare won the U15 (2012) and U17 (2013) 2 km beach run at the Australian titles along with team medals in the swim and board races. Hoare also swam at state level but then decided to concentrate on athletics.

=== Prep and university career ===
In 2015, Hoare won the Australian U20 cross-country championship. He then left his local school and studied at Trinity Grammar School, which had a strong sports system. He was coached by Brad Woods. He also befriended Morgan McDonald from the neighbouring Newington College, who had a strong influence on his athletics career. McDonald was a four-time NCAA champion competing for the University of Wisconsin and Hoare followed him there.

While competing collegiately for the University of Wisconsin, Hoare won the 1500 metres at the 2018 NCAA Division I Outdoor Track and Field Championships. He also set the University of Wisconsin and Big Ten Conference records in indoor mile.

After graduating, Hoare signed to run professionally under the newly formed On Athletics Club, sponsored by the running shoe company On.

=== Rise to international prominence ===
In February 2021 at the New Balance Indoor Grand Prix, Hoare set the Australian and Oceanian record for the indoor 1500 m with a time of 3:32.35, which was also the seventh fastest all-time indoor mark.

At the postponed Tokyo Olympics in August 2021, Hoare competed in the 1500 m. He finished third in a heat (in 3:36.09), fourth in a semi-final (in 3:34.35) and 11th in the final (in 3:35.79), which was won by Jakob Ingebrigtsen from Norway.

On 4 December 2021 at the BU Sharon Colyear-Danville Season Opener in Boston, Hoare broke the Australian and Oceanian indoor 5000 metres record by over 27 seconds with a time of 13:09.96. Fellow On Athletics Club runner Geordie Beamish finished second in that race with a time of 13:12.53 to set the New Zealand indoor record.

=== Later career ===
==== 2022 ====
On his birthday, 29 January 2022, Hoare ran the men's Wanamaker Mile at the 114th Millrose Games in New York with a time of 3:50.83. The time took the Australian and Oceanian indoor mile record off Charlie Hunter, and placed Hoare as the 11th fastest indoor miler ever. He also became the first Australian to win the Wanamaker Mile in the race's 96-year history.

On 16 June 2022 at the Bislett Games, Hoare set the Australian and Oceanian outdoor mile record with a time of 3:47.48, finishing just behind Jakob Ingebrigtsen.

On 6 August 2022 at the 2022 Commonwealth Games held in Birmingham, he won the 1500 m men's final, setting a personal best and a new Games record of 3:30.12, beating Olympic silver medallist and 2019 world champion Timothy Cheruiyot (3:30.21) and 2022 world champion Jake Wightman (3:30.53). Hoare became the first Australian to take the Commonwealth 1500 m or mile title since Herb Elliott in 1958.

Although 2022 brought his greatest athletic success to date, Hoare later described the year as one of his worst personally. The then-25-year-old's struggles with anxiety and depression drove him to the brink of retiring from the sport. However, after receiving support from a therapist and his family, Hoare found his way back to his passion for running.

==== 2023 ====
In February 2023 at the World Athletics Cross Country Championships, held in Australia, Hoare led a team in the mixed relay, alongside Jessica Hull, Stewart McSweyn and Abbey Caldwell, winning a bronze medal.

On 15 June 2023 at the Bislett Games, Hoare set the Oceanian outdoor 1500 m record with a time of 3:29.41 to finish 7th. In late July, Hoare disclosed that he had a small sports hernia and would not be competing in the 2023 World Athletics Championships or the remainder of the 2023 outdoor season. As he came back from the injury, the first major one in his career, Hoare sustained another injury, a sacral stress reaction.

==== 2024 ====
In his third race since returning from injury, Hoare placed ninth in the Bowerman Mile at the 2024 Prefontaine Classic in a time of 3:49.11. Crucially, Hoare ran under the Olympic standard time, becoming the fourth Australian to do so during qualifying period.

At July's London Diamond League, Hoare outlasted his competition to run a 3:49.03 season's best in the mile to win a Diamond League race for the first time.

At the Olympic Games, Hoare failed to qualify for the semi-final from his initial heat. In his repechage heat, he was passed on the home straight and finished two places out of semi-final qualification.

==== 2025 ====
Hoare ran a new personal best of 3:34.91 for the 1500m at the New Balance Indoor Grand Prix.

== Competition record ==
=== International competitions ===
Representing Australia
Year	Competition	Venue	Position	Event	Time
2021	Olympic Games	Tokyo, Japan	11th	1500 m	3:35.79
2022	World Indoor Championships	Belgrade, Serbia	5th	1500 m i	3:34.36
2022	World Championships	Eugene, OR, United States	18th (sf)	1500 m	3:38.36
2022	Commonwealth Games	Birmingham, United Kingdom	1st	1500 m	3:30.12
2023	World Cross Country Championships	Bathurst, Australia	3rd	Mixed relay	23:26
2024	Olympic Games	Paris, France	5th (repechage)	1500 m	3:34.00
2025	World Indoor Championships	Nanjing, China	13th (h)	1500 m	3:42.29
2026	WA Cross Country Championships	Tallahassee, USA	1st	Mixed Relay	
2026	Commonwealth Games	Glasgow, United Kingdom	5th	Mile	3:56.28

=== National and NCAA titles ===
- Australian Athletics Championships
  - 1500 metres: 2022
- NCAA Division I Men's Outdoor Track and Field Championships
  - 1500 metres: 2018
