= Morgan McDonald =

Australian long-distance runner

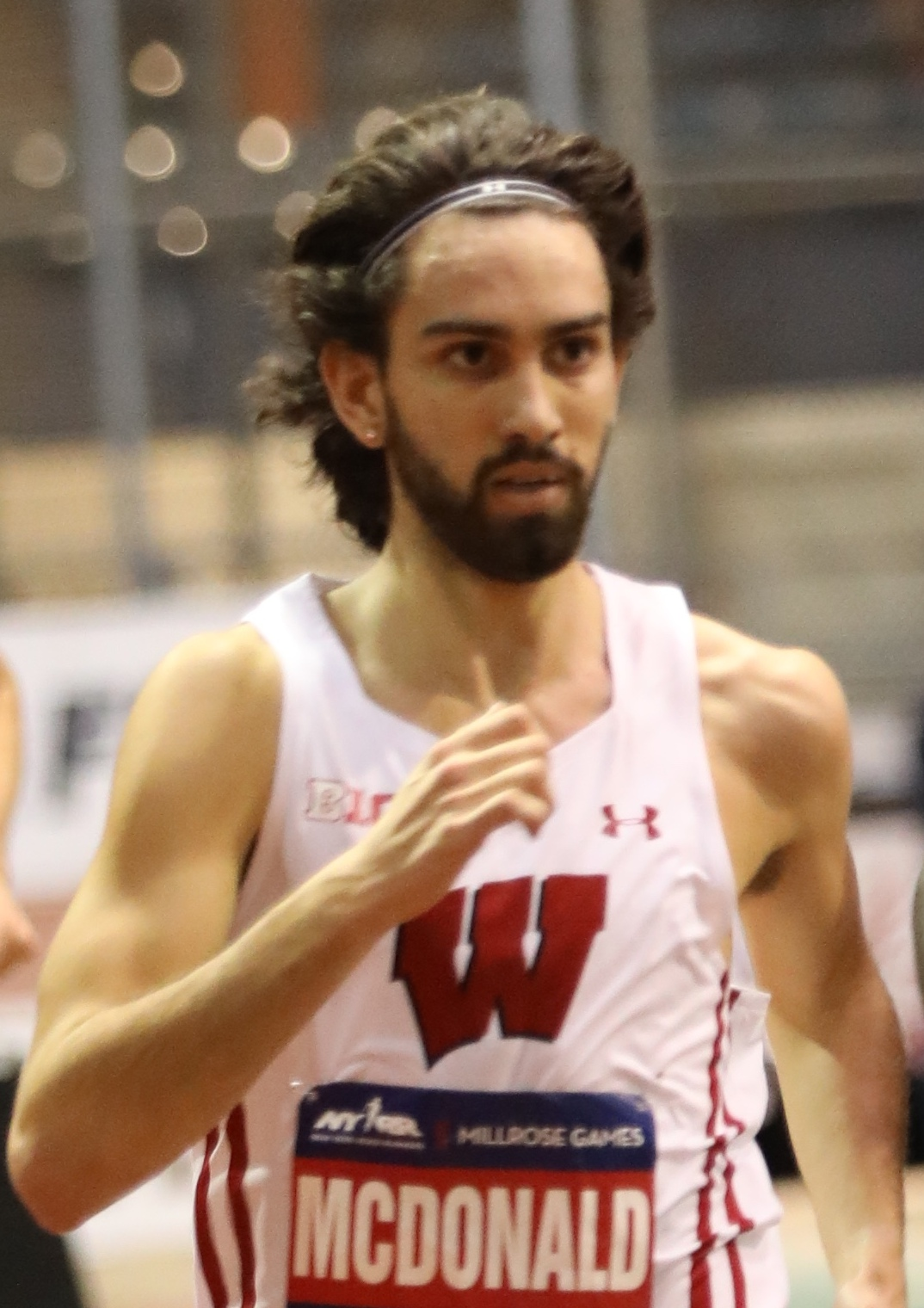
- Morgan McDonald in 2019

Personal information
- Nationality: Australian
- Born: 23 April 1996 (age 30) Sydney, Australia
- Height: 1.88 m (6 ft 2 in)

Sport
- Country: Australia
- Sport: Distance Running
- Event: 5000 metres
- College team: Wisconsin Badgers
- Club: On Athletics Club
- Turned pro: Jun. 2019
- Coached by: Dathan Ritzenhein

Achievements and titles
- Olympic finals: 2020 Tokyo; 5000 m - 17th (h); 2024 Paris; 5000 m - 9th (h)
- World finals: 2017 London; 5000 m - 20th (h); 2019 Doha; 5000 m - 17th (h); 2023 Budapest; 5000 m - 16th (h)
- Personal bests: Outdoor; 1500 m: 3:37.42 (Nashville 2020); Mile: 3:54.63 (Bay Shore 2019); 3000 m: 7:35.78 (Zagreb 2023); 5000 m: 13:00.48 (Los Angeles 2024); 10,000 m: 27:58.75 (Irvine 2021); Indoor; 1500 m: 3:41.80 i (New York 2016); Mile: 3:57.83 i (New York 2016); 3000 m: 7:42.76 i (New York 2019); 2-mile: 8:14.92 i AR (Staten Island 2021); 5000 m: 13:07.30 i (Boston 2024); Road; Half marathon: 60:58 (Houston)

Morgan McDonald (born 23 April 1996) is an Australian distance runner. McDonald is a two-time Olympian who competed at the Tokyo 2020 and Paris 2024 Olympics.

McDonald contested the 5000 metres at the 2020 Olympics, 2024 Olympics, 2017 World Championships, and 2019 World Championships. McDonald also competed in 2018 Commonwealth Games and placed 8th in 5000 meters in 14:11.37.

As a collegiate athlete, McDonald won four NCAA titles and eight Big Ten Conference and was an eight-time NCAA Division I All-American.

== Early life ==
McDonald attended Newington College in Sydney, Australia, completing his schooling in 2013. He was a key member in Newington's 2011 GPS Senior Cross Country and 2012 Senior Athletics premierships. He won Newington's A.D.G. Stewart Trophy for 3000m running.

In addition to his athletic achievements at Newington College, Morgan excelled in the classroom. He finished with an ATAR of 98.95, achieving a Band 6 (>90% raw mark) in three subjects: Ancient History, English Extension 1 and Physics.

== Prep ==
McDonald won the 2007 Australian U12 National Cross Country Championship.

McDonald won the 2009 Australian U14 National Cross Country Championship.

McDonald won the 2011 Australian U16 National Cross Country Championship.

McDonald was the 2012 U18 Australian National 3000 meters Champion.

McDonald won the 2012 Australian U18 National Cross Country Championship.

McDonald won the 2013 Australian U18 National Cross Country Championship.

McDonald represented Australia in the 2013 World Junior Cross Country Championship in the U20 division at the age of 16 in Bydgoszcz, Poland and again in 2015 in Guiyang, China at the age of 18.

McDonald ran in the 2014 Australian Nationals in the 5000 meters for the U20 division.

McDonald won the 2018 Australian National 5000m in 2018, in a time of 13.19.05 (a record for the National championship).

McDonald competed and finished 10th in the 5000 meters in the U20 division at the 2014 World Junior Athletics Championships in Hayward Field, Eugene.

== NCAA ==
McDonald is a 4-time NCAA Champion, 8-time NCAA Division I All-American Wisconsin Badger distance runner. Morgan McDonald won 10 km in 29:08.3 at the 2018 NCAA Division I Cross Country Championships leading the Wisconsin Badgers men's cross country to an 8th-place team finish.

Representing University of Wisconsin
School Year	Big Ten Conference Cross country	NCAA Cross country	Big Ten Conference Indoor Track	NCAA Indoor Track	Big Ten Conference Outdoor Track	NCAA Outdoor Track
2018-19	23:26.4 - 1st	10K - 29:08.3 - 1st	5K - 13:37.85 - 1st	3K - 7:52.85 - 1st 5K - 13:41.76 - 1st	10K - 29:26.06 - 1st	5K - 14:06.01 - 1st
2018-19	23:26.4 - 1st	10K - 29:08.3 - 1st	5K - 13:37.85 - 1st	Distance Medley Relay: 9:34.74 - 7th	10K - 29:26.06 - 1st	5K - 14:06.01 - 1st
2017-18					5000 m - 14:47.93 - 10th	
2016-17	8K - 24:35.7 - 1st	10K - 29:59.2 - 7th	5000 m - 14:04.44 - 1st		5000 m - 14:14.43 - 1st	
2016-17	8K - 24:35.7 - 1st	10K - 29:59.2 - 7th	3000 m - 8:12.58 - 1st			
2015-16	8K - 23:30.0 - 5th		5000 m - 14:01.23 - 2nd	3000 m - 8:12.92 - 12th	1500 3:46.37 3rd	5000 m - 13:29.79 - 5th
2015-16	8K - 23:30.0 - 5th		3000 m - 8:03.83 - 1st			
2014-15	8K - 23:56.3 - 12th	10K 31:19.3 75th	3000 m - 8:11.67 - 2nd			

== Professional career ==
In July 2019, McDonald signed with Under Armour. After a period continuing to train under Wisconsin head coach Mick Byrne, McDonald relocated to Boulder, CO, where he trained under Joe Bosshard until June 2021, when he left Under Armour and Bosshard and signed with the On Athletics Club. In 2021, McDonald represented Australia in the 5000m at the 2021 Tokyo Olympics, where he failed to advance from the qualifying heats.

In both 2022 and 2023, McDonald sustained injuries that resulted in abbreviated outdoor seasons. After being knocked out in the qualifying heats of the 5000 m at the 2023 World Athletics Championships, McDonald ran a personal best in the 3000 m (7:35.78) and placed seventh in the 5000 m at the 2023 World Athletics Road Running Championships.

McDonald launched his Olympics campaign in early 2024, running a 13:07.30 5000m indoors at the Boston University John Thomas Terrier Classic. At his first Australian Athletics Championship since 2018, McDonald was narrowly outleaned for the victory in the 5000 m and finished just 0.05 seconds behind the winner, Matthew Ramsden. In May 2024, McDonald ran a personal best in the 5000 m at the USATF LA Grand Prix in 13:00.48, achieving the Olympic standard in the process. At the 2024 Summer Olympics he ran the 5000 m in 13:52 finishing 9th in his qualifying heat and did not advance to the final.

In January 2025, McDonald ran his debut half marathon in Houston in a time of 1:00:58, the fourth fastest time by an Australian.

== Representing Australia ==
Year	Competition	Venue	Position	Event	Notes
Summer Olympics
2021	2020 Tokyo Olympics	Tokyo, Japan	17th place	5000 metres	13:37.36
2024	2024 Paris Olympics	Paris, France	9th (heat)	5000 m	13:52.67
World Athletics Road Running Championships
2023	World Athletics Road Running Championships	Riga, Latvia	7th place	5 km	13:26 NR
World Athletics Track Championships
2023	2023 World Championships	Budapest, Hungary	32nd place	5000 metres	13:43.58
2019	2019 World Championships	Doha, Qatar	17th place	5000 metres	13:26.80
2017	2017 World Championships	London Stadium	20th place	5000 metres	13:30.73
2014	2014 IAAF World Junior Championships	Hayward Field	10th place	5000 metres	14:10.08
IAAF World Cross Country Championships
2015	2015 World Cross Championships	Guiyang	Team 19th place	Australia Men U20	353 points
2015	2015 World Cross Championships	Guiyang	40th place	8000 metres	25:56
2013	2013 World Cross Championships	Bydgoszcz	Team 8th place	Australia Men U20	171 points
2013	2013 World Cross Championships	Bydgoszcz	33rd place	8000 metres	23:21
Commonwealth Games
2018	Athletics at the 2018 Commonwealth Games	Carrara Stadium	8th place	5000 metres	14:11.37
Australian Athletics Championships
2024	Australian Athletics Championships	SA Athletics Stadium	2nd place	5000 metres	13:39.66
2018	Australian Athletics Championships	Carrara Stadium	1st place	5000 metres	13:19.05
2014	Australian Athletics Championships U 20	Sydney Olympic Park	1st place	5000 metres	14:34.41
2014	Australian Athletics Championships U 20	Sydney Olympic Park	1st place	1500 metres	3:58.83
