= On Athletics Club =

Distance running training group

- Short name: OAC
- Sport: Athletics
- Founded: 2020
- Location: Boulder, Colorado
- Head coach: Dathan Ritzenhein
- Main sponsor: On

On Athletics Club (OAC) is a training group of professional distance runners sponsored by On. The team is coached by Dathan Ritzenhein, Kelsey Quinn, Jason Ross, and Laura Thweatt. It was founded in August 2020 with eight original members. The OAC Global team trains primarily out of Boulder, Colorado. OAC Europe is coached by Vincent Guyot and Thomas Dreissigacker and OAC Oceania is coached by Craig Mottram and Ben Green. On also sponsors a number of runners who are not OAC team members.

== Non-championship accomplishments ==
On August 3, 2020, Joe Klecker and Olli Hoare became the first people to ever break 4 minutes in the mile on Colorado soil. The long streak of no sub-4-minute miles is attributed to the elevation of the state.

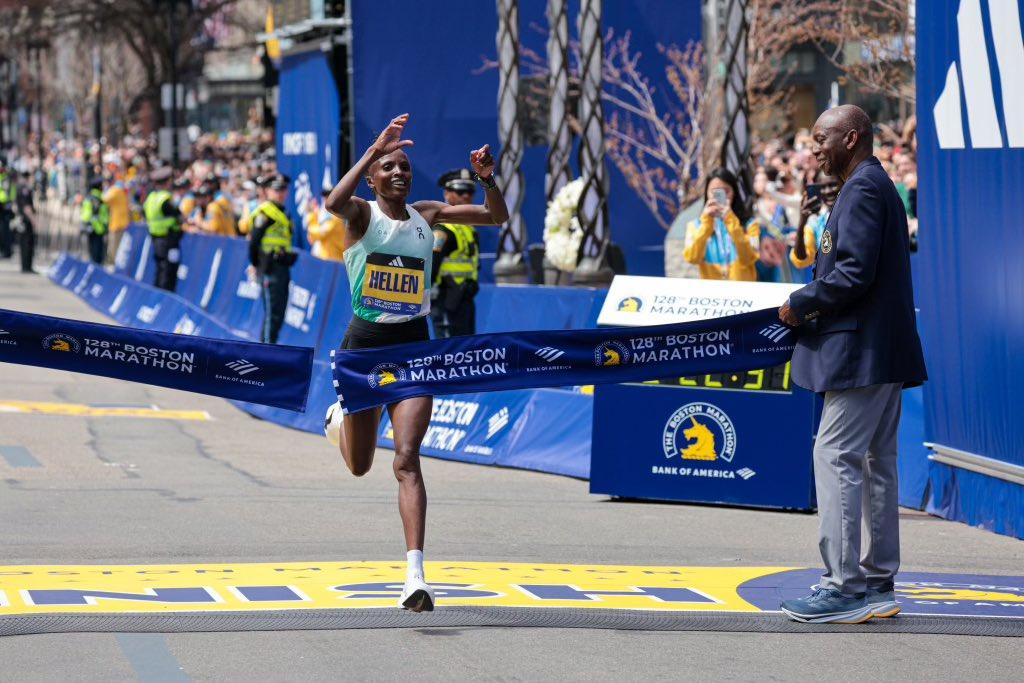
Obiri winning the 2024 Boston Marathon

In the 2023 Boston Marathon, Hellen Obiri won the race in a time of 2:21:38. She then won the 2023 New York City Marathon in 2:27:23, becoming the first woman since 1989 to win both races in the same year.

At the 2024 Boston Marathon, Obiri won her second straight Boston marathon, beating second place finisher, Sharon Lokedi, by eight seconds in a time of 2:22:37. Obiri place second at the 2025 Boston Marathon.

== Roster ==
=== Men ===
Global Team

- Geordie Beamish (New Zealand) (August 2020)
- Olli Hoare (Australia) (August 2020)
- Joe Klecker (United States) (August 2020)
- Mario García (Spain) (June 2022)
- Yared Nuguse (United States) (June 2022)
- Ky Robinson (Australia) (June 2024)
- Robert Farken (Germany) (November 2024)
- Dylan Jacobs (United States) (November 2024)
- Ryan Ford (United States) (October 2025)
- Patrick Kiprop (Kenya) (October 2025)

Europe Team

- Corentin Le Clezio (France)
- Federico Riva (Italy)
- Mohamed Attaoui (Spain)
- Luke McCann (Republic of Ireland)
- Sebastian Frey (Austria)
- Noah Baltus (Netherlands)
- Jonas Raess (Switzerland)
- George Mills (United Kingdom)

Oceania Team

- Peyton Craig (Australia)
- Jesse Hunt (Australia)
- Ed Trippas (Australia)
- Ben Buckingham (Australia)

=== Women ===
Global Team

- Sage Hurta-Klecker (United States) (June 2021)
- Alicia Monson (United States) (August 2020)
- Josette Andrews (United States) (January 2023)
- Hellen Obiri (Kenya) (January 2022)
- Sintayehu Vissa (Italy) (August 2022)
- Olivia Markezich (United States) (June 2024)

Europe Team

- Nathalie Blomqvist (Finland)
- Ludovica Cavalli (Italy)
- Revée Walcott-Nolan (United Kingdom)
- Jolanda Kallabis (Germany)
- Aimee Pratt (United Kingdom)
- Marta Garcia Alonso (Spain)

Oceania Team

- Carley Thomas (New Zealand)
- Bendere Oboya (New Zealand)
- Amy Bunnage (New Zealand)
- Maudie Skyring (New Zealand)
- Claudia Hollingsworth (New Zealand)

=== Former members ===
Former members include Alicja Konieczek, Carlos Villarreal, Leah Falland, Carmela Cardama Báez, Morgan McDonald, Tsigie Gebreselama, Maia Ramsden, and Cari Hughes. As of January 2026, Konieczek, McDonald, Gebreselama, and Ramsden remain sponsored by On.

== Records set by OAC athletes ==
Date	Venue	Athlete	Event	Time	Record
February 13, 2021	Ocean Breeze Athletic Complex	Morgan McDonald (Australia)	Indoor 2 miles	8:14.92	AR (former)
February 13, 2021	Ocean Breeze Athletic Complex	Olli Hoare (Australia)	Indoor 1500 m	3:32.35	AR
December 4, 2021	Boston University	Olli Hoare (Australia)	Indoor 5000 m	13:09.96	AR
December 4, 2021	Boston University	Geordie Beamish (New Zealand)	Indoor 3000 m	7:39.50	NR (former)
January 29, 2022	The Armory	Geordie Beamish (New Zealand)	Indoor 5000 m	13:12.53	NR (former)
January 29, 2022	The Armory	Olli Hoare (Australia)	Indoor Mile	3:50.83	AR
April 16, 2022	Boston, MA	Geordie Beamish (New Zealand)	5 km	13:36	NR
June 16, 2022	Bislett Stadion	Olli Hoare (Australia)	One mile	3:47.48	AR
January 27, 2023	Boston University	Yared Nuguse (United States)	Indoor 3000 m	7:28.24	AR
February 11, 2023	The Armory	Yared Nuguse (United States)	Indoor Mile	3:47.38	AR
February 11, 2023	The Armory	Mario Garcia (Spain)	Indoor Mile	3:51.79	NR
February 11, 2023	The Armory	Sintayehu Vissa (Italy)	Indoor Mile	4:24.54	NR
February 11, 2023	The Armory	Alicia Monson (United States)	Indoor 3000 m	8:25.05	AR
February 11, 2023	The Armory	Jonas Raess (Switzerland)	Indoor 3000 m	7:35.24	NR
February 11, 2023	The Armory	Geordie Beamish (New Zealand)	Indoor 3000 m	7:36.22	NR
March 4, 2023	San Juan Capistrano, CA	Alicia Monson (United States)	10,000m	30:03.82	AR
June 15, 2023	Bislett Stadion	Yared Nuguse (United States)	1500 m	3:29.02	AR
June 15, 2023	Bislett Stadion	Olli Hoare (Australia)	1500 m	3:29.02	AR
July 21, 2023	Stade Louis II	Geordie Beamish (New Zealand)	Steeplechase	8:13.26	AR (former)
July 23, 2023	London Stadium	Alicia Monson (United States)	5000m	14:19.45	AR
September 8, 2023	King Baudouin Stadium	Mario Garcia (Spain)	2000m	4:49.85	NR
September 10, 2023	Zagreb, Croatia	Jonas Raess (Switzerland)	3000m	7:35.12	NR
September 17, 2023	Hayward Field	Yared Nuguse (United States)	Mile	3:43.97	AR
September 17, 2023	Hayward Field	Mario Garcia (Spain)	Mile	3:47.69	NR
January 26, 2024	Boston University	Geordie Beamish (New Zealand)	Indoor 5000 m	13:04.33	NR
February 11, 2024	The Armory	Alicia Monson (United States)	Indoor 2 mile	9:09.70	AR
February 11, 2024	The Armory	Geordie Beamish (New Zealand)	Indoor 2 mile	8:05.73	AR
February 11, 2024	The Armory	Morgan McDonald (Australia)	Indoor 2 mile	8:12.01	NR
July 7, 2024	Stade Sébastien Charléty	Geordie Beamish (New Zealand)	Steeplechase	8:09.64	AR
August 8, 2024	Stade de France	Sintayehu Vissa (Italy)	1500m	3:58.11	NR
August 8, 2024	Stade de France	Maia Ramsden (New Zealand)	1500m	4:02.20	NR
August 21, 2024	Ryavallen	Maia Ramsden (New Zealand)	Mile	4:24.79	NR
February 2, 2025	Boston University	Robert Farken (Germany)	Indoor Mile	3:49.45	NR
February 8, 2025	The Armory	Yared Nuguse (United States)	Indoor Mile	3:46.63	WR (former)
February 8, 2025	The Armory	Kai Robinson (Australia)	Indoor 3000 m	7:30.38	NR
March 2, 2025	Boston University	Maia Ramsden (Australia)	Indoor Mile	4:21.51	NR
March 2, 2025	Boston University	Sintayehu Vissa (Italy)	Indoor Mile	4:21.56	NR
June 6, 2025	Stadio Olimpico	Robert Farken (Germany)	1500 m	3:30.80	NR
June 12, 2025	Bislett Stadium	Robert Farken (Germany)	Mile	3:49.12	NR
July 27. 2025	Olympiastadion	Robert Farken (Germany)	Mile	3:48.83	NR

== Championship results by OAC athletes ==
Year	Meet	Venue	Athlete	Event	Place	Time
2021	Polish Championships	Golęcin Stadion	Alicja Konieczek	Steeplechase	1st	9:35.63
2021	European Team Championships	Stadion Śląski	Alicja Konieczek	Steeplechase	2nd	9:27.79
2021	United States Olympic Trials	Hayward Field	Joe Klecker	10,000 m	3rd	27:54.90
2021	United States Olympic Trials	Hayward Field	Alicia Monson	10,000 m	3rd	31:18.55
2021	United States Olympic Trials	Hayward Field	Emily Oren	Steeplechase	H2 12th	9:59.34
2021	United States Olympic Trials	Hayward Field	Leah Falland	Steeplechase	9th	9:27.06
2021	United States Olympic Trials	Hayward Field	Sage Hurta-Klecker	800 m	SF1	DNF
2021	Olympic Games	National Stadium	Joe Klecker	10,000 m	16th	28:14.18
2021	Olympic Games	National Stadium	Morgan McDonald	5000 m	H2 11th	13:37.36
2021	Olympic Games	National Stadium	Olli Hoare	1500 m	11th	3:35.79
2021	Olympic Games	National Stadium	Alicja Konieczek	Steeplechase	H3 8th	9:31.79
2021	Olympic Games	National Stadium	Alicia Monson	10,000 m	13th	31:21.36
2021	European Cross Country Championships	National Sports Campus Dublin, Ireland	Carmela Cardama Báez	8 km XC	8th	27:41
2022	USATF Indoor Championships	The Podium	Alicia Monson	3000 m	2nd	8:43.86
2022	World Indoor Championships	Štark Arena	Olli Hoare	1500 m	5th	3:34.36
2022	World Indoor Championships	Štark Arena	Geordie Beamish	3000 m	10th	7:46.91
2022	World Indoor Championships	Štark Arena	Alicia Monson	3000 m	7th	8:46.39
2022	USATF 10,000m Championships	Hayward Field	Joe Klecker	10,000 m	1st	28:28.71
2022	USATF 10,000m Championships	Hayward Field	Alicia Monson	10,000 m	2nd	30:51.09
2022	USATF Championship	Hayward Field	Yared Nuguse	1500 m	11th	3:47.46
2022	USATF Championship	Hayward Field	Sage Hurta-Klecker	800 m	7th	1:59.43
2022	Kenyan Trials	Moi International Sports Centre	Hellen Obiri	10,000 m	1st	31:49.88
2022	Australian Championships	Sydney Olympic Park Athletic Centre	Olli Hoare	1500 m	1st	3:40.79
2022	Spanish Championships	Estadio Enrique Lopez Cuenca	Mario Garcia	1500 m	1st	3:35.52
2022	Spanish Championships	Estadio Enrique Lopez Cuenca	Carmela Cardama Báez	5000 m	4th	16:14.37
2022	World Championships	Hayward Field	Joe Klecker	10,000 m	9th	27:38.73
2022	World Championships	Hayward Field	Geordie Beamish	5000 m	H1 12th	13:36.86
2022	World Championships	Hayward Field	Mario Garcia	1500 m	4th	3:30.20
2022	World Championships	Hayward Field	Olli Hoare	1500 m	SF1 10th	3:38.36
2022	World Championships	Hayward Field	Alicia Monson	10,000 m	13th	30:59.85
2022	World Championships	Hayward Field	Hellen Obiri	10,000 m	2nd	30:10.02
2022	Commonwealth Games	Alexander Stadium	Olli Hoare	1500 m	1st	3:30.12
2022	Commonwealth Games	Alexander Stadium	Geordie Beamish	5000 m	6th	13:21.71
2022	European Championships	Olympiastadion	Jonas Raess	5000 m	15th	13:36.18
2022	European Championships	Olympiastadion	Alicja Konieczek	Steeplechase	4th	9:25.15
2022	USA Cross Country Championships	Mission Bay Park	Alicia Monson	10 km XC	1st	34:01
2023	USATF Indoor Championship	Albuquerque Convention Center	Sage Hurta-Klecker	1500 m	2nd	4:17.26
2023	Italian Indoor Championships	Palaindoor di Ancona	Sintayehu Vissa	1500 m	2nd	4:08.20
2023	European Indoor Championships	Ataköy Arena	Sintayehu Vissa	1500 m	9th	4:10.05
2023	USATF Championships	Hayward Field	Alicia Monson	10,000m	2nd	32:17.51
2023	USATF Championships	Hayward Field	Alicia Monson	5000m	2nd	14:55.10
2023	USATF Championships	Hayward Field	Joe Klecker	10,000m	2nd	28:24.50
2023	USATF Championships	Hayward Field	Joe Klecker	5000m	4th	13:26.94
2023	USATF Championships	Hayward Field	Yared Nuguse	1500m	1st	3:34.90
2023	USATF Championships	Hayward Field	Sage Hurta-Klecker	800m	4th	2:01.19
2023	USATF Championships	Hayward Field	Josette Andrews	5000m	4th	15:01.80
2023	Spanish Championships	Torrent, Spain	Mario García	1500m	3rd	3:34.77
2023	Swiss Athletics Championships	Stadio Comunale Bellinzona	Jonas Raess	5000m	1st	13:44.00
2023	Italian Athletics Championships	Molfetta, Italy	Sintayehu Vissa	1500m	1st	4:06.85
2023	World Championships	National Athletics Centre	Sintayehu Vissa	1500m	H3 7th	4:01.66
2023	World Championships	National Athletics Centre	Alicia Monson	10,000m	5th	31:32.29
2023	World Championships	National Athletics Centre	Joe Klecker	10,000m	20th	29:03.41
2023	World Championships	National Athletics Centre	Yared Nuguse	1500m	5th	3:30.25
2023	World Championships	National Athletics Centre	Mario García	1500m	6th	3:30.26
2023	World Championships	National Athletics Centre	Jonas Raess	5000m	H2 12th	13:37.84
2023	World Championships	National Athletics Centre	Morgan McDonald	5000m	H2 16th	13:43.58
2023	World Championships	National Athletics Centre	Alicia Monson	5000m	14th	15:04:08
2023	World Athletics Road Racing Championships	Riga, Lativia	Morgan McDonald	5000m	7th	13:26
2024	Spanish Indoor Championships	Ourense, Spain	Mario Garcia	1500m	3rd	3:44.56
2024	USA Indoor Track and Field Championships	Albuquerque Convention Center	Yared Nuguse	3000m	1st	7:55.76
2024	USA Indoor Track and Field Championships	Albuquerque Convention Center	Josette Andrews	3000m	2nd	9:03.10
2024	World Athletics Indoor Championships	Commonwealth Arena	George Beamish	1500m	1st	3:36.54
2024	World Athletics Indoor Championships	Commonwealth Arena	Mario Garcia	1500m	11th	3:48.40
2024	World Athletics Indoor Championships	Commonwealth Arena	Yared Nuguse	3000m	2nd	7:43.59
2024	World Athletics Indoor Championships	Commonwealth Arena	Josette Andrews	3000m	11th	8:41.93
2024	Australian Championships	SA Athletics Stadium	Olli Hoare	1500m	2nd	3:37.83
2024	Australian Championships	SA Athletics Stadium	Morgan McDonald	5000m	2nd	13:39.66
2024	European Championships	Stadio Olimpico	Jonas Raess	5000m	16th	13:31.43
2024	European Championships	Stadio Olimpico	Mario Garcia	1500m	H1 7th	3:44.30
2024	European Championships	Stadio Olimpico	Sintayehu Vissa	1500m	H1 10th	4:11.22
2024	United States Olympic trials	Hayward Field	Yared Nuguse	1500m	2nd	3:30.86
2024	United States Olympic trials	Hayward Field	Josette Andrews	5000m	11th	15:26.25
2024	United States Olympic trials	Hayward Field	Sage Hurta-Klecker	800m	5th	2:00.38
2024	United States Olympic trials	Hayward Field	Sage Hurta-Klecker	1500m	SF1 6th	4:08.07
2024	United States Olympic trials	Hayward Field	Olivia Markezich	Steeplechase	6th	9:14.87
2024	Swiss Championships	Stadion Deutweg	Jonas Raess	5000m	1st	13:46.45
2024	Spanish Championships	Estadi Olímpic Camilo Cano	Mario Garcia	1500m	3rd	3:36.31
2024	Italian Athletics Championships	La Spezia	Sintayehu Vissa	1500m	2nd	4:05.29
2024	Olympic Games	Stade de France	George Beamish	Steeplechase	H3 7th	8:25.86
2024	Olympic Games	Stade de France	Olli Hoare	1500m	SF2 5th	3:34:00
2024	Olympic Games	Stade de France	Mario García	1500m	H1 10th	3:37.90
2024	Olympic Games	Stade de France	Yared Nuguse	1500m	3rd	3:27.80
2024	Olympic Games	Stade de France	Sintayehu Vissa	1500m	SF2 10th	3:58.11
2024	Olympic Games	Stade de France	Maia Ramsden	1500m	SF1 8th	4:02.20
2024	Olympic Games	Stade de France	Morgan McDonald	5000m	H2 9th	13:52.67
2024	Olympic Games	Stade de France	Jonas Raess	5000m	H2 12th	13:55.04
2024	Olympic Games	Stade de France	Hellen Obiri	Marathon	3rd	2:23:10
2025	USA Indoor Track and Field Championships	Ocean Breeze Athletic Complex	Dylan Jacobs	3000m	2nd	7:38.02
2025	USA Indoor Track and Field Championships	Ocean Breeze Athletic Complex	Olivia Markezich	3000m	7th	8:52.49
2025	USA Indoor Track and Field Championships	Ocean Breeze Athletic Complex	Sage Hurta-Klecker	800m	3rd	2:00.13
2025	World Athletics Indoor Championships	Nanjing's Cube	Ky Robinson	3000m	3rd	7:47.09
2025	World Athletics Indoor Championships	Nanjing's Cube	Dylan Jacobs	3000m	5th	7:48.41
2025	World Athletics Indoor Championships	Nanjing's Cube	Sintayehu Vissa	1500m	H1 5th	4:14.25
2025	World Athletics Indoor Championships	Nanjing's Cube	Maia Ramsden	1500m	H2 6th	4:14.89
2025	World Athletics Indoor Championships	Nanjing's Cube	Olli Hoare	1500m	H3 3rd	3:42.29
2025	Australian Championships	WA Athletics Stadium	Olli Hoare	1500m	3rd	3:34.61
2025	USA Outdoor Track and Field Championships	Hayward Field	Yared Nuguse	1500m	5th	3:31.34
2025	USA Outdoor Track and Field Championships	Hayward Field	Dylan Jacobs	5000m	9th	13:29.99
2025	USA Outdoor Track and Field Championships	Hayward Field	Sage Hurta-Klecker	800m	3rd	1:59.48
2025	USA Outdoor Track and Field Championships	Hayward Field	Josette Andrews	5000m	3rd	15:15.01
2025	USA Outdoor Track and Field Championships	Hayward Field	Alicia Monson	5000m	15th	15:30.40
2025	USA Outdoor Track and Field Championships	Hayward Field	Olivia Markezich	Steeplechase	5th	9:14.26
2025	German Athletics Championships	Heinz-Steyer-Stadion	Robert Farken	1500m	1st	3:46.96
2025	World Athletics Championships	Japan National Stadium	Geordie Beamish	Steeplechase	1st	8:33.88
