= 2018 NCAA Division I cross country championships =

2018 cross-country running meet of the NCAA (Division I)

2018 NCAA Division I Cross Country Championships
- Edition: 80th–Men; 38th–Women
- Date: November 17, 2018
- Host city: (Wisconsin) Madison, WI
- Distances: 10 km–Men; 6 km–Women

Highlights Men's last 6 minutes Women's last 6 minutes

The 2018 NCAA Division I Cross Country Championships was the 80th annual NCAA Men's Division I Cross Country Championship and the 38th annual NCAA Women's Division I Cross Country Championship to determine the team and individual national champions of NCAA Division I men's and women's collegiate cross country running in the United States. In all, four different titles were contested: men's and women's individual and team championships.

== Women's title ==
- Distance: 6,000 meters
- (DC) = Defending champions

=== Women's Team Result (Top 10) ===
PL	Team	Total Time	Average Time	Score	1	2	3	4	5	6	7
1st place, gold medalist(s)	Colorado	1:40:36	20:07	65	1	8	14	20	22	26	63
2nd place, silver medalist(s)	New Mexico	1:41:07	20:13	103	2	5	9	38	49	60	102
3rd place, bronze medalist(s)	Oregon	1:42:10	20:26	160	3	12	27	46	72	77	85
4	Michigan	1:43:27	20:41	213	25	33	40	53	62	73	79
5	Stanford	1:43:09	20:37	232	11	16	39	76	90	184	211
6	Boise State	1:43:55	20:47	288	6	34	70	82	96	128	142
7	BYU	1:44:01	20:48	310	7	21	67	98	117	129	134
8	Notre Dame	1:44:07	20:49	313	10	32	54	66	151	185	190
9	Washington	1:44:19	20:51	321	17	29	58	81	136	154	178
10	Wisconsin	1:44:16	20:51	325	4	57	84	89	91	194	208

=== Women's Individual Result (Top 10) ===
Rank	Name	Team	Avg. Mile	Time
1st place, gold medalist(s)	(United States) Dani Jones	Colorado	5:17.2	19:42.8
2nd place, silver medalist(s)	(Eritrea) Weini Kelati	New Mexico	5:17.9	19:45.3
3rd place, bronze medalist(s)	(Australia) Jessica Hull	Oregon	5:19.3	19:50.4
4	(United States) Alicia Monson	Wisconsin	5:20.5	19:55.2
5	(Kenya) Ednah Kurgat	New Mexico	5:20.7	19:55.8
6	(United States) Allie Ostrander	Boise State	5:21.0	19:56.9
7	(United States) Erica Birk-Jarvis	BYU	5:21.3	19:58.1
8	(United States) Makena Morley	Colorado	5:21.9	20:00.1
9	(Canada) Charlotte Prouse	New Mexico	5:22.4	20:02.1
10	(United States) Anna Rohrer	Notre Dame	5:22.5	20:02.4

== Men's title ==
- Distance: 10,000 meters

=== Men's Team Result (Top 10) ===
PL	Team	Total Time	Average Time	Score	1	2	3	4	5	6	7
1st place, gold medalist(s)	Northern Arizona	2:28:15	29:39	83	5	12	19	22	25	33	122
2nd place, silver medalist(s)	BYU	2:28:51	29:46	116	8	18	20	27	43	51	58
3rd place, bronze medalist(s)	Portland	2:29:50	29:58	160	17	21	34	41	47	55	100
4	Colorado	2:28:57	29:47	178	6	7	9	37	119	132	185
5	Stanford	2:29:55	29:59	201	2	10	26	62	101	111	142
6	Washington	2:30:43	30:08	213	15	32	48	54	64	98	172
7	Iowa State	2:30:30	30:06	220	3	40	50	61	66	121	194
8	Wisconsin	2:30:27	30:05	240	1	13	46	84	96	175	199
9	Colorado State	2:31:49	30:21	309	14	35	69	94	97	114	130
10	Boise State	2:32:09	30:25	342	24	38	39	88	153	179	180

=== Men's Individual Result (Top 10) ===
Rank	Name	Team	Time	Avg. Mile
1st place, gold medalist(s)	(Australia) Morgan McDonald	Wisconsin	29:08.3	4:41.3
2nd place, silver medalist(s)	(United States) Grant Fisher	Stanford	29:08.8	4:41.4
3rd place, bronze medalist(s)	(Kenya) Edwin Kurgat	Iowa State	29:09.0	4:41.5
4	(United States) Isai Rodriguez	Oklahoma State	29:10.5	4:41.7
5	(United States) Aaron Templeton	Furman	29:11.9	4:41.9
6	(United States) Tyler Day	Northern Arizona	29:12.9	4:42.1
7	(Kenya) Amon Kemboi	Campbell	29:14.6	4:42.3
8	(United States) Joe Klecker	Colorado	29:15.0	4:42.4
9	(United States) John Dressel	Colorado	29:16.9	4:42.7
10	(United States) Conner Mantz	BYU	29:17.1	4:42.8

== See also ==
- NCAA Men's Division II Cross Country Championship
- NCAA Women's Division II Cross Country Championship
- NCAA Men's Division III Cross Country Championship
- NCAA Women's Division III Cross Country Championship
