= Two miles =

Uncommon middle distance race

Athletics Two miles

World records
- Men: Jakob Ingebrigtsen (NOR) 7:54.10 (2023)
- Women: Meseret Defar (ETH) 8:58.58 (2007)

Short track world records
- Men: Josh Kerr (GBR) 8:00.67 (2024)
- Women: Genzebe Dibaba (ETH) 9:00.48 (2014)

The 2 mile (3,520 yards, 10,560 feet, or 3,218.688 metres) is a historic running distance. Like the mile run, it is still contested at some invitational meets due its historical chronology in the United States and United Kingdom. It has been largely superseded by the 3000 m and 5000 m, and by the 3200 m in NFHS American high school competitions. The IAAF no longer keeps official world records for this distance; they are called world best instead.

The world best for men is 7:54.10 set by Norwegian Jakob Ingebrigtsen on 9 June 2023 in Paris. Ingebrigtsen, along with previous world best holder Daniel Komen, are the only people to have run the distance in under 8 minutes, and thus covered two miles at an average sub-four-minute mile pace. The women's record is 8:58.58, set by Ethiopian Meseret Defar in Brussels on 14 September 2007.

== Area bests ==
- Updated 9 July 2026.

Area	Men			Women		
Area	Time	Season	Athlete	Time	Season	Athlete
World	7:54.10	2023	Jakob Ingebrigtsen (NOR)	8:58.58	2007	Meseret Defar (ETH)
Area bests
Africa (records)	7:58.61	1997	Daniel Komen (KEN)	8:58.58	2007	Meseret Defar (ETH)
Asia (records)	8:13.16	2008	Rashid Ramzi (BHR)	9:13.85	2014	Mimi Belete (BHR)
Europe (records)	7:54.10	2023	Jakob Ingebrigtsen (NOR)	9:04.84 i	2024	Laura Muir (GBR)
North, Central America and Caribbean (records)	8:03.62 i	2024	Grant Fisher (USA)	9:09.70 i	2024	Alicia Monson (USA)
Oceania (records)	8:03.50	2007	Craig Mottram (AUS)	9:13.94 i	2008	Kimberly Smith (NZL)
South America (records)	8:18.09	2026	Santiago Catrofe (URU)	none		

== All-time top 25 ==
- Mx = mixed race

=== Men (outdoor) ===
- Correct as of June 2023.

Rank	Result	Athlete	Nationality	Date	Place	Ref.
1	7:54.10	Jakob Ingebrigtsen	Norway	9 June 2023	Paris	
2	7:58.61	Daniel Komen	Kenya	19 July 1997	Hechtel	
3	8:01.08	Haile Gebrselassie	Ethiopia	31 May 1997	Hengelo	
4	8:03.50	Craig Mottram	Australia	10 June 2007	Eugene	
5	8:04.83	Tariku Bekele	Ethiopia	10 June 2007	Eugene	
6	8:07.07	Matt Tegenkamp	United States	10 June 2007	Eugene	
7	8:07.54	Joshua Cheptegei	Uganda	30 June 2019	Stanford	
8	8:07.59	Paul Chelimo	United States	30 June 2019	Stanford	
9	8:07.68	Eliud Kipchoge	Kenya	4 June 2005	Eugene	
10	8:07.75	Mo Farah	Great Britain	24 August 2014	Birmingham	
11	8:08.69	Selemon Barega	Ethiopia	30 June 2019	Stanford	
12	8:09.01	Moses Kiptanui	Kenya	30 July 1994	Hechtel	
13	8:09.23	Ishamel Rokitto Kipkurui	Kenya	9 June 2023	Paris	
14	8:10.16	Jacob Kiplimo	Uganda	21 August 2021	Eugene	
15	8:10.34	Lamecha Girma	Ethiopia	9 June 2023	Paris	
16	8:10.59	Benjamin Limo	Kenya	28 May 2006	Eugene	
17	8:10.98	Khalid Boulami	Morocco	6 July 1996	Hechtel	
18	8:11.04	Berihu Aregawi	Ethiopia	21 August 2021	Eugene	
19	8:11.09	Grant Fisher	United States	21 August 2021	Eugene	
20	8:11.48	Alan Webb	United States	4 June 2005	Eugene	
21	8:11.55	Joe Klecker	United States	21 August 2021	Eugene	
22	8:11.59	Bob Kennedy	United States	19 July 1997	Hechtel	
23	8:11.62	Boaz Cheboiywo	Kenya	4 June 2005	Eugene	
24	8:11.73	Smail Sghir	Morocco	6 July 1996	Hechtel	
25	8:11.74	Dathan Ritzenhein	United States	10 June 2007	Eugene	

==== Notes ====
Below is a list of other times equal or superior to 8:07.46:

- Daniel Komen also ran 7:58.91 (1998), 8:03.54 (1996).
- Haile Gebrselassie also ran 8:01.72 (1999), 8:01.86 (1999), 8:07.46 (1995).

=== Women (outdoor) ===
- Correct as of June 2025.

Rank	Result	Athlete	Nationality	Date	Place	Ref.
1	8:58.58	Meseret Defar	Ethiopia	14 September 2007	Brussels	
2	8:59.08	Francine Niyonsaba	Burundi	27 May 2022	Eugene	
3	9:06.74	Letesenbet Gidey	Ethiopia	20 August 2021	Eugene	
4	9:11.49	Mercy Cherono	Kenya	24 August 2014	Birmingham	
5	9:11.97 Mx	Regina Jacobs	United States	12 August 1999	Los Gatos	
6	9:12.59	Viola Kibiwott	Kenya	24 August 2014	Birmingham	
7	9:12.90	Irene Jelagat	Kenya	24 August 2014	Birmingham	
8	9:13.85	Mimi Belete	Bahrain	31 May 2014	Eugene	
9	9:14.09	Priscah Cherono	Kenya	14 September 2007	Brussels	
10	9:14.55	Hellen Obiri	Kenya	20 August 2021	Eugene	
11	9:14.71	Beatrice Chebet	Kenya	27 May 2022	Eugene	
12	9:15.74	Laura Galván	Mexico	27 May 2022	Eugene	
13	9:16.62	Sylvia Kibet	Kenya	14 September 2007	Brussels	
14	9:16.73	Konstanze Klosterhalfen	Germany	27 May 2022	Eugene	
15	9:16.78	Jenny Simpson	United States	27 April 2018	Des Moines	
16	9:16.95	Betsy Saina	Kenya	24 August 2014	Birmingham	
17	9:17.62	Helen Schlachenhaufen	United States	27 May 2022	Eugene	
18	9:17.75	Jane Hedengren	United States	8 June 2025	Renton	
19	9:18.73	Elly Henes	United States	27 May 2022	Eugene	
20	9:19.01	Edinah Jebitok	Kenya	27 May 2022	Eugene	
21	9:19.56	Sonia O'Sullivan	Ireland	27 June 1998	Cork City	
22	9:20.17	Eleanor Fulton	United States	27 May 2022	Eugene	
23	9:20.19	Whittni Morgan	United States	27 May 2022	Eugene	
24	9:20.25	Shannon Rowbury	United States	31 May 2014	Eugene	
25	9:20.81	Alemitu Haroye	Ethiopia	24 August 2014	Birmingham	

==== Notes ====
Below is a list of other times equal or superior to 9:14.55:

- Francine Niyonsaba also ran 9:00.75 (2021).
- Meseret Defar also ran 9:10.47 (2007)
- Mercy Cherono also ran 9:13.27 (2014).

=== Men (indoor) ===
- Correct as of February 2026.

Rank	Result	Athlete	Nationality	Date	Place	Ref.
1	8:00.67	Josh Kerr	Great Britain	11 February 2024	New York City	
2	8:03.40	Mo Farah	Great Britain	21 February 2015	Birmingham	
3	8:03.62	Grant Fisher	United States	11 February 2024	New York City	
4	8:04.35	Kenenisa Bekele	Ethiopia	16 February 2008	Birmingham	
5	8:04.69	Haile Gebrselassie	Ethiopia	21 February 2003	Birmingham	
6	8:05.70	Cole Hocker	United States	11 February 2024	New York City	
7	8:05.73	Geordie Beamish	New Zealand	11 February 2024	New York City	
8	8:06.48	Paul Koech	Kenya	16 February 2008	Birmingham	
9	8:06.61	Hicham El Guerrouj	Morocco	23 February 2003	Liévin	
10	8:07.39	Eliud Kipchoge	Kenya	18 February 2012	Birmingham	
11	8:07.41	Galen Rupp	United States	24 January 2014	Boston	
12	8:07.83	Parker Wolfe	United States	1 February 2026	New York City	
13	8:08.16	Moses Kipsiro	Uganda	18 February 2012	Birmingham	
14	8:08.27	Tariku Bekele	Ethiopia	18 February 2012	Birmingham	
15	8:08.39	Markos Geneti	Ethiopia	20 February 2004	Birmingham	
16	8:08.40	Ky Robinson	Australia	1 February 2026	New York City	
17	8:08.60	Graham Blanks	United States	1 February 2026	New York City	
18	8:08.91	Cooper Teare	United States	1 February 2026	New York City	
19	8:09.49	Bernard Lagat	United States	16 February 2013	New York City	
20	8:09.66	Hailu Mekonnen	Ethiopia	18 February 2001	Birmingham	
21	8:10.78	Arne Gabius	Germany	18 February 2012	Birmingham	
22	8:10.91	Drew Hunter	United States	1 February 2026	New York City	
23	8:11.33	Ben True	United States	11 February 2017	New York City	
24	8:11.47	Habtom Samuel	Eritrea	1 February 2026	New York City	
25	8:11.56	Ryan Hill	United States	11 February 2017	New York City	

==== Notes ====
Below is a list of other times equal or superior to 8:11.56:

- Cole Hocker also ran 8:07.31 (2026).
- Josh Kerr also ran 8:07.68 (2026)
- Geordie Beamish also ran 8:08.58 (2026).

=== Women (indoor) ===
- Correct as of February 2024.

Rank	Result	Athlete	Nationality	Date	Place	Ref.
1	9:00.48	Genzebe Dibaba	Ethiopia	15 February 2014	Birmingham	
2	9:04.84	Laura Muir	United Kingdom	11 February 2024	New York City	
3	9:06.26	Meseret Defar	Ethiopia	26 February 2009	Prague	
4	9:07.12	Melknat Wudu	Ethiopia	11 February 2024	New York City	
5	9:09.70	Alicia Monson	United States	11 February 2024	New York City	
6	9:10.28	Elinor Purrier	United States	13 February 2021	New York City	
7	9:12.23	Tirunesh Dibaba	Ethiopia	20 February 2010	Birmingham	
8	9:12.35	Vivian Cheruiyot	Kenya	20 February 2010	Birmingham	
9	9:12.68	Sentayehu Ejigu	Ethiopia	20 February 2010	Birmingham	
10	9:13.94	Kim Smith	New Zealand	26 January 2008	Boston	
11	9:15.71	Emma Coburn	United States	13 February 2021	New York City	
12	9:15.80	Nikki Hiltz	United States	11 February 2024	New York City	
13	9:16.76	Nozomi Tanaka	Japan	11 February 2024	New York City	
14	9:18.29	Emily Mackay	United States	11 February 2024	New York City	
15	9:18.35	Jenny Simpson	United States	7 February 2015	Boston	
16	9:19.39	Jessica Augusto	Portugal	20 February 2010	Birmingham	
17	9:21.04	Sally Kipyego	Kenya	8 February 2014	Boston	
18	9:21.59	Hiwot Ayalew	Ethiopia	15 February 2014	Birmingham	
19	9:22.66	Julie-Anne Staehli	Canada	13 February 2021	New York City	
20	9:23.38	Regina Jacobs	United States	27 January 2002	Boston	
21	9:23.58	Emily Infeld	United States	11 February 2024	New York City	
22	9:24.71	Courtney Wayment	United States	11 February 2024	New York City	
23	9:26.87	Emily Lipari	United States	13 February 2021	New York City	
24	9:26.95	Helen Schlachenhaufen	United States	13 February 2021	New York City	
25	9:27.45	Katrina Coogan	United States	13 February 2021	New York City	

==== Notes ====
Below is a list of other times equal or superior to 9:13.94:

- Meseret Defar also ran 9:06.26 (2009), 9:10.50 (2008)

== World Best Performance progression ==
=== Men ===
==== Outdoors ====
Time	Athlete	Date	Place
9:17.0	Alfred Shrubb (GBR)	1903-09-12	London, United Kingdom
9:08.4	Alfred Shrubb (GBR)	1904-06-11	Glasgow, United Kingdom
9:08.4	Edvin Wide (SWE)	1925-06-23	Kramfors, Sweden
9:01.4	Edvin Wide (SWE)	1926-09-12	Berlin, Germany
8:59.6	Paavo Nurmi (FIN)	1931-06-24	Helsinki, Finland
8:58.4	Don Lash (USA)	1936-06-13	Princeton, USA
8:57.4	Gunnar Höckert (FIN)	1936-09-24	Stockholm, Sweden
8:56.0	Miklós Szabó (HUN)	1937-09-30	Budapest, Hungary
8:53.2	Taisto Mäki (FIN)	1939-06-07	Helsinki, Finland
8:47.8	Gunder Hägg (SWE)	1942-06-03	Stockholm, Sweden
8:46.4	Gunder Hägg (SWE)	1944-06-25	Östersund, Sweden
8:42.8	Gunder Hägg (SWE)	1944-08-04	Stockholm, Sweden
8:40.4	Gaston Reiff (BEL)	1952-08-26	Paris, France
8:33.4	Sándor Iharos (HUN)	1955-05-30	London, United Kingdom
8:32.0	Albie Thomas (AUS)	1958-08-07	Dublin, Ireland
8:30.0	Murray Halberg (NZL)	1961-06-07	Jyväskylä, Finland
8:29.8	Jim Beatty (USA)	1962-06-08	Los Angeles, USA
8:29.6	Michel Jazy (FRA)	1963-06-06	Paris, France
8:26.4	Bob Schul (USA)	1964-08-29	Los Angeles, USA
8:22.6	Michel Jazy (FRA)	1965-06-23	Melun, France
8:19.8	Ron Clarke (AUS)	1967-07-27	Västerås, Sweden
8:19.6	Ron Clarke (AUS)	1968-08-24	London, United Kingdom
8:17.8	Emiel Puttemans (BEL)	1971-08-21	Edinburgh, United Kingdom
8:14.0	Lasse Virén (FIN)	1972-08-14	Stockholm, Sweden
8:13.8	Brendan Foster (GBR)	1973-08-27	London, United Kingdom
8:13.51	Steve Ovett (GBR)	1978-09-15	London, United Kingdom
8:13.45	Saïd Aouita (MAR)	1987-05-28	Turin, Italy
8:12.17	Khalid Skah (MAR)	1993-06-30	Hechtel, Belgium
8:09.01	Moses Kiptanui (KEN)	1994-06-30	Hechtel, Belgium
8:07.46	Haile Gebrselassie (ETH)	1995-05-27	Kerkrade, Netherlands
8:03.54	Daniel Komen (KEN)	1996-07-14	Lappeenranta, Finland
8:01.08	Haile Gebrselassie (ETH)	1997-05-31	Hengelo, Netherlands
7:58.61	Daniel Komen (KEN)	1997-07-19	Hechtel, Belgium
7:54.10	Jakob Ingebrigtsen (NOR)	2023-06-09	Paris, France

==== Indoors ====
Time	Athlete	Date	Place
8:09.66	Hailu Mekonnen (ETH)	2000-02-20	Birmingham, United Kingdom
8:04.69	Haile Gebrselassie (ETH)	2003-02-21	Birmingham, United Kingdom
8:04.35	Kenenisa Bekele (ETH)	2008-02-16	Birmingham, United Kingdom
8:03.40	Mo Farah (GBR)	2015-02-21	Birmingham, United Kingdom
8:00.67	Josh Kerr (GBR)	2024-02-11	New York City, United States

=== Women ===
==== Outdoors ====
Time	Athlete	Date	Place
10:07.0	Doris Brown (USA)	1971-07-10	Bakersfield, USA
9:55.9	Francie Larrieu (USA)	1972-06-04	Redwood City, USA
9:19.56	Sonia O'Sullivan (IRL)	1998-06-27	Cork, Ireland
9:10.47	Meseret Defar (ETH)	2007-05-20	Carson, USA
8:58.58	Meseret Defar (ETH)	2007-09-14	Brussels, Belgium

==== Indoors ====
Time	Athlete	Date	Place
9:28.15	Lynn Jennings (USA)	1986-02-20	New York City, USA
9:23.38	Regina Jacobs (USA)	2002-01-27	Boston, USA
9:10.50	Meseret Defar (ETH)	2008-01-26	Boston, USA
9:06.26	Meseret Defar (ETH)	2009-02-26	Prague, Czech Republic
9:00.48	Genzebe Dibaba (ETH)	2014-02-15	Birmingham, United Kingdom

=== US high school boys progression ===
Note: this list only covers boys because the history of 2 mile running largely occurred before Title IX, before high school girls were allowed to compete, which occurred about the same time as conversion to metric distances.

Time	Athlete	School	City	Date	Place
(8:40.0 h i)	Gerry Lindgren	Rogers High School	Spokane, Washington	15 February 1964	Cow Palace, Daly City, California
8:57.8 h	Mike Ryan	Wilcox High School	Santa Clara, California	1965	
8:48.3 h	Rick Riley	Ferris High School	Spokane, Washington	28 May 1966	Washington State Championships
8:41.5 h	Steve Prefontaine	Marshfield High School	Coos Bay, Oregon	25 April 1969	Corvallis Invitational, Corvallis, Oregon
8:40.9 h	Craig Virgin	Lebanon High School	Lebanon, Illinois	9 June 1973	International Prep Invitational, Prospect, Illinois
8:36.3 h	Jeff Nelson	Burbank High School	Burbank, California	6 May 1979	Pepsi Invitational, Westwood, Los Angeles, California
8:34.23	German Fernandez	Riverbank High School	Riverbank, California	20 June 2008	Nike Outdoor Nationals, Greensboro, North Carolina video
8:29.46	Lukas Verzbicas	Carl Sandburg High School	Orland Hills, Illinois	4 June 2011	Prefontaine Classic, Eugene, Oregon video

== See also ==
- 3000 metres
- 3200 meters
- Mile run
