= Alicia Monson =

American long-distance runner

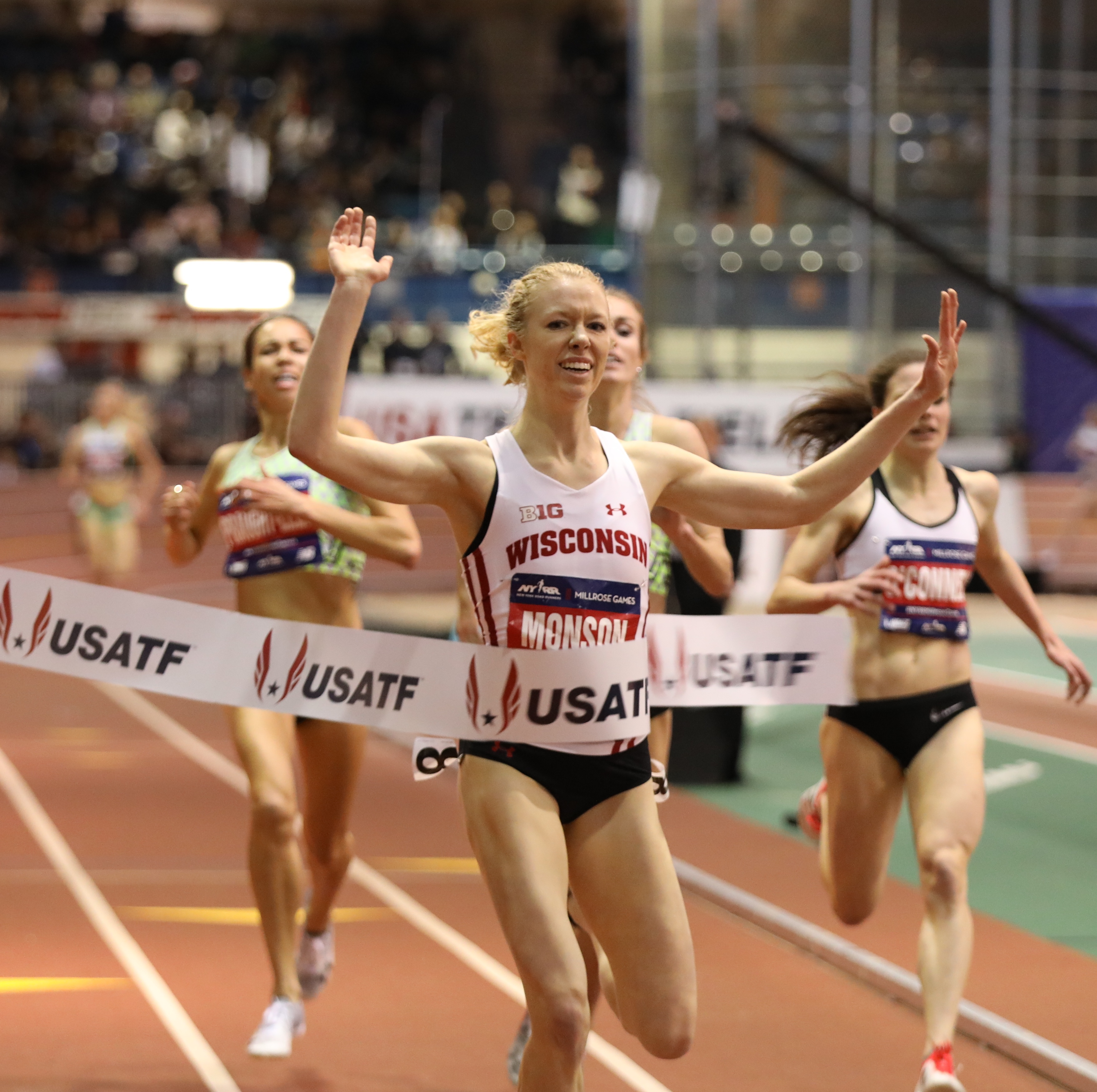
- Monson winning the 2019 Millrose Games 3000 m

Personal information
- Born: May 13, 1998 (age 28) Amery, Wisconsin, U.S.
- Education: University of Wisconsin '20
- Height: 5 ft 7 in (170 cm)

Sport
- Country: United States
- Sport: Track and field
- Events: 5000 m, 10,000 m
- University team: Wisconsin Badgers
- Club: On Athletics Club
- Coached by: Dathan Ritzenhein

Achievements and titles
- Personal bests: Outdoor; 5000 m: 14:19.45 AR (London 2023); 10,000 m: 30:03.82 AR (San Juan Capistrano 2023); Indoor; 1500 m: 4:06.38 (New York City 2023); Mile: 4:23.55 (New York City 2023); 3000 m: 8:25.05 (New York City 2023); Two miles: 9:09.70 AR (New York City 2024)

Alicia Monson (born May 13, 1998) is an American long-distance runner who primarily competes in the 5000 meters and 10,000 meters. She holds the North American record over the 5000 m, 10,000 m, and two mile distances, all set as part of the On Athletics Club under coach Dathan Ritzenhein.

== Early and personal life ==
Monson was born in Amery, Wisconsin, to parents Beth Ann and Jay Monson. She has three siblings: Katrina, Cole, and Lydia.

Competing for Amery High School under coaches Paul Enslin and Kelsey Faschingbauer, she was the Wisconsin state champion in cross country and the 3200 m her senior year, and was the state runner-up in the 1600 m her junior and senior years.

== Collegiate career ==
After graduating from Amery High School in 2016, Monson enrolled at the University of Wisconsin to compete for the Wisconsin Badgers under coach Jill Miller.

=== 2016-17: Freshman ===
Monson made her Badgers cross country debut on September 23, 2016, placing fifth at the Badgers Classic. Later that season she would go on to place 30th at the Big 10 Cross Country Championships and finish 96th at the national meet in Terre Haute.

Focusing on the 5000 m in her freshman track season, Monson ran a seasons best of 16:04.09 at the Stanford Invitational on March 31 and placed fourth at the Big 12 Outdoor Championships on May 17. She qualified for the West Preliminary Round in Austin, but was unable to advance to the NCAA Championships, placing 13th in her heat.

=== 2017-18: Sophomore ===
In her sophomore cross country season, Monson placed an impressive 19th at the Nuttycombe Invitational in Madison, but was unable to replicate that success during the championship season, placing 139th at the national meet in Louisville.

Indoors, Monson qualified for the NCAA Indoor Championships with a 15:47.23 5000 m personal best in Ames, Iowa. At the Big 10 Indoor Championships, she doubled in the 3000 m and 5000 m, placing third in the former and 7th in the latter. Contesting the 5000 m at the national meet, she placed 13th in a time of 16:19.45.

During the outdoor season, Monson claimed a silver medal at the Big 10 Championships over 5000 m and ran a 9-second 5000 m personal best at the West Prelims, qualifying her for the NCAA Outdoor Championships in Eugene, Oregon. Competing at her first NCAA Championships outdoors, Alicia placed 18th over 5000 m in a time of 16:04.46.

=== 2018-2019: Junior ===
Going into her junior cross country season, Monson had high hopes of winning a national title at national at home in Madison, Wisconsin. She took first place at the Nuttycombe Invitational on September 28, won the Big 10 Championships on October 28, and placed first at the Great Lakes Regional on November 9. At NCAAs on November 17, she placed fourth, 12 seconds behind first-place finisher Dani Jones.

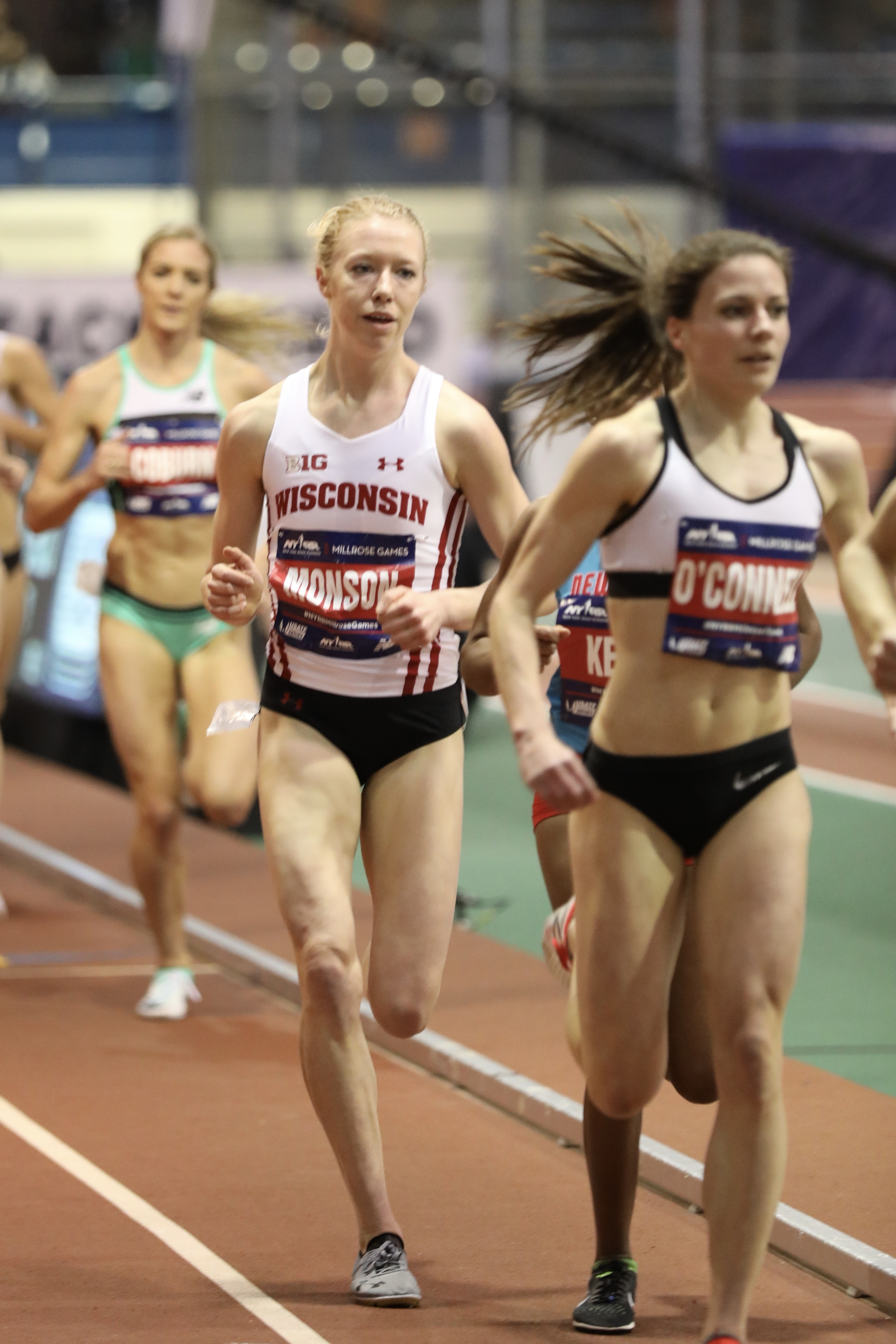
Monson competing at the 2019 Millrose Games

On January 25, Monson set a 5000 m personal best of 15:34.53 in Bloomington, Indiana. Two weeks later, she competed in the prestigious Millrose Games, contesting the 3000 m and taking the win over a field of professionals, running a personal best of 8:45.97 in the process. Later that month, she attempted a 3000-5000 double at the Big 10 Indoor Championships, winning both in 9:14.52 and 16:18.63 respectively. She attempted the same double at the NCAA Indoor Championships in Birmingham, Alabama on March 8 and 9. In the 5000 m she claimed her first NCAA title, winning in a personal best and meet record of 15:31.26. The next day, she contested the 3000 m where she finished 10th in 9:14.52.

Outdoors, Monson competed in just two races due to a foot injury from overexertion. She made her debut in the 10,000 m at the Stanford Invitational, running a time of 33:02.91 and finished 9th at the Big 12 Outdoor Championships in the 5000 m.

=== 2019-2020: Senior ===
Rebounding from her injury hampered 2019 outdoor season, Monson opened her 2019 cross country season with a second-place finish at the Joe Piane Invitational. She went undefeated her next three races, defending her titles at the Nuttycombe Invitational, Big 10 Championships and Great Lakes Regional. At the national meet, Monson finished runner-up, 10 seconds behind champion Weini Kelati.

On February 29, Monson competed in what would be her last race as a Wisconsin Badgers, winning the Big 10 Indoor 5000 m title in 16:04.77, her fifth and final Big 10 individual title.

== Professional career ==
=== 2020 ===
In April 2020, after the University of Wisconsin's decision not to honor the additional season of eligibility granted by the NCAA due to the COVID-19 pandemic, Monson decided to turn professional. In August, she joined the newly formed On Athletics Club, based in Boulder, and coached by 3-time US Olympian Dathan Ritzenhein.

She made her pro debut on August 22, running a 15:14.71 5000 m personal best in Los Angeles. In December, she set a 10,000 m personal best of 31:10.84 in San Juan Capistrano.

=== 2021 ===
On June 26, 2021, at the U.S. Olympic Track & Field trials in Eugene, Oregon, she placed third in the 10,000 m in a time of 31:18.55 to claim a spot on the American team for the event at the delayed 2020 Tokyo Olympics. Such was the effort, after the medal ceremony, she collapsed, started vomiting, and had to go to the hospital as a precaution, according to her coach, Dathan Ritzenhein. She finished 13th at the Games in 31:21.36.

Later that summer, she set a 3000 m personal best of 8:40.08 at the Meeting de Paris and ran a personal best over 5000 m of 14:42.56 at the Memorial Van Damme in Brussels.

=== 2022 ===
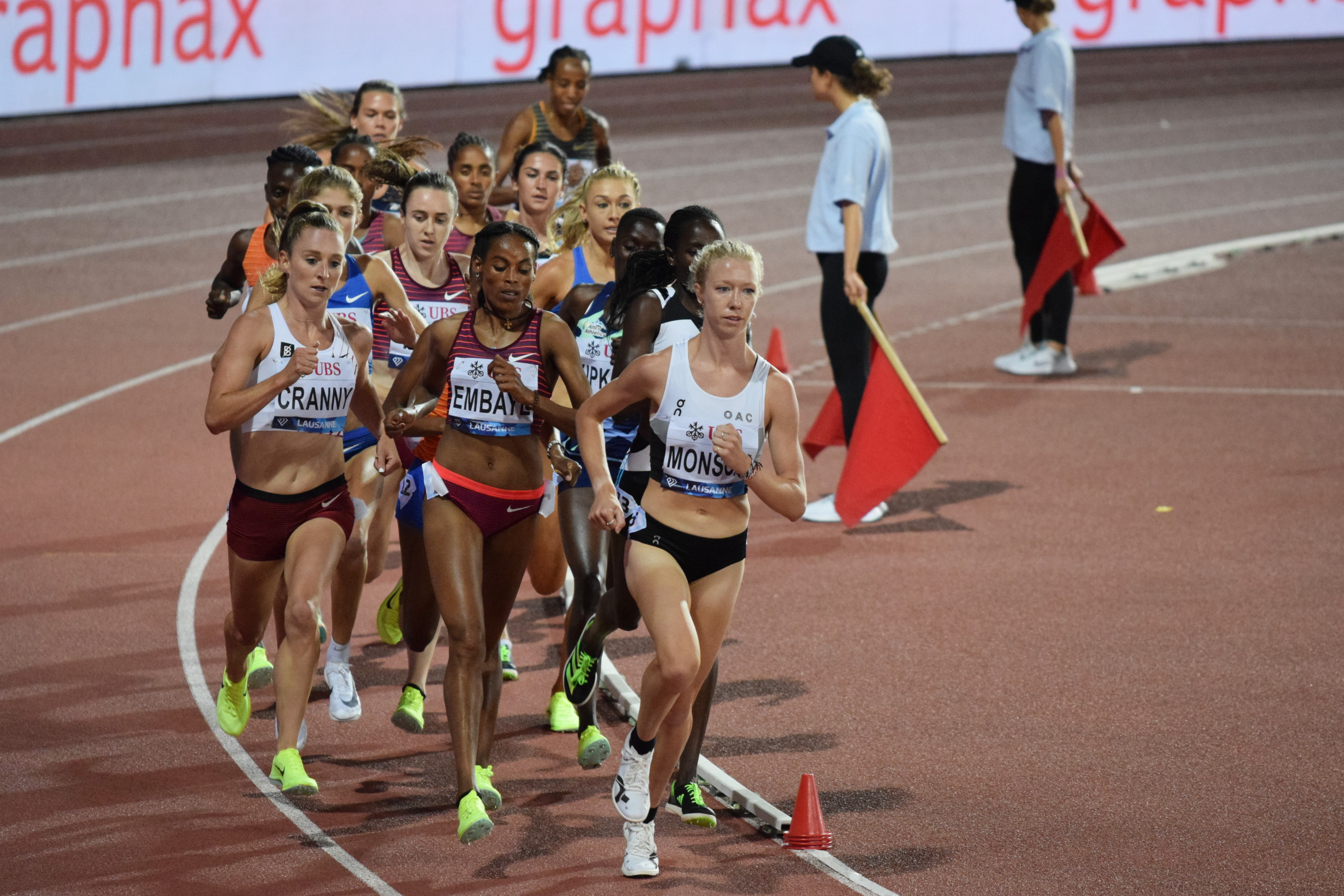
Monson (leading) at the 2022 Athletissima Lausanne

In January 2022, Monson won the USATF Cross Country Championships held in San Diego, California. Later that month, Monson competed at the Millrose Games, winning the 3000 in a lifetime best of 8:31.62.

After qualifying via a second-place finish at the US Indoor Championships, she next placed seventh over the 3000 m at the World Indoor Championships in Belgrade in March.

On May 27, she finished second to Karissa Schweizer at the USATF 10,000 m championships, running a personal best of 30:51.09 in the process. On June 16, Monson finished fifth at the Bislett Games 5000 m, running a lifetime best of 14:31.11, becoming the third fastest American of all time over the distance. In July, she placed 13th in the 10,000 m at the World Championships held in Eugene, Oregon. On August 26, she finished second at the Athletissima Lausanne, running 8:26.81, good for a 5-second lifetime best.

Monson capped off her season in December with a win at the Cross Champs in Austin, Texas, a gold meet on the World Cross Country Tour.

=== 2023 ===
On February 11, Monson set a new North American indoor record in the 3000 meters with a time of 8:25.05 at the Millrose Games in New York, improving her lifetime best by more than six seconds. She broke by 0.65 s Karissa Schweizer's record set in 2020. On March 4, Monson smashed Molly Huddle's North American 10,000 m record of 30:13.17 set in 2016 with a time of 30:03.82 at the Sound Running The TEN in San Juan Capistrano.

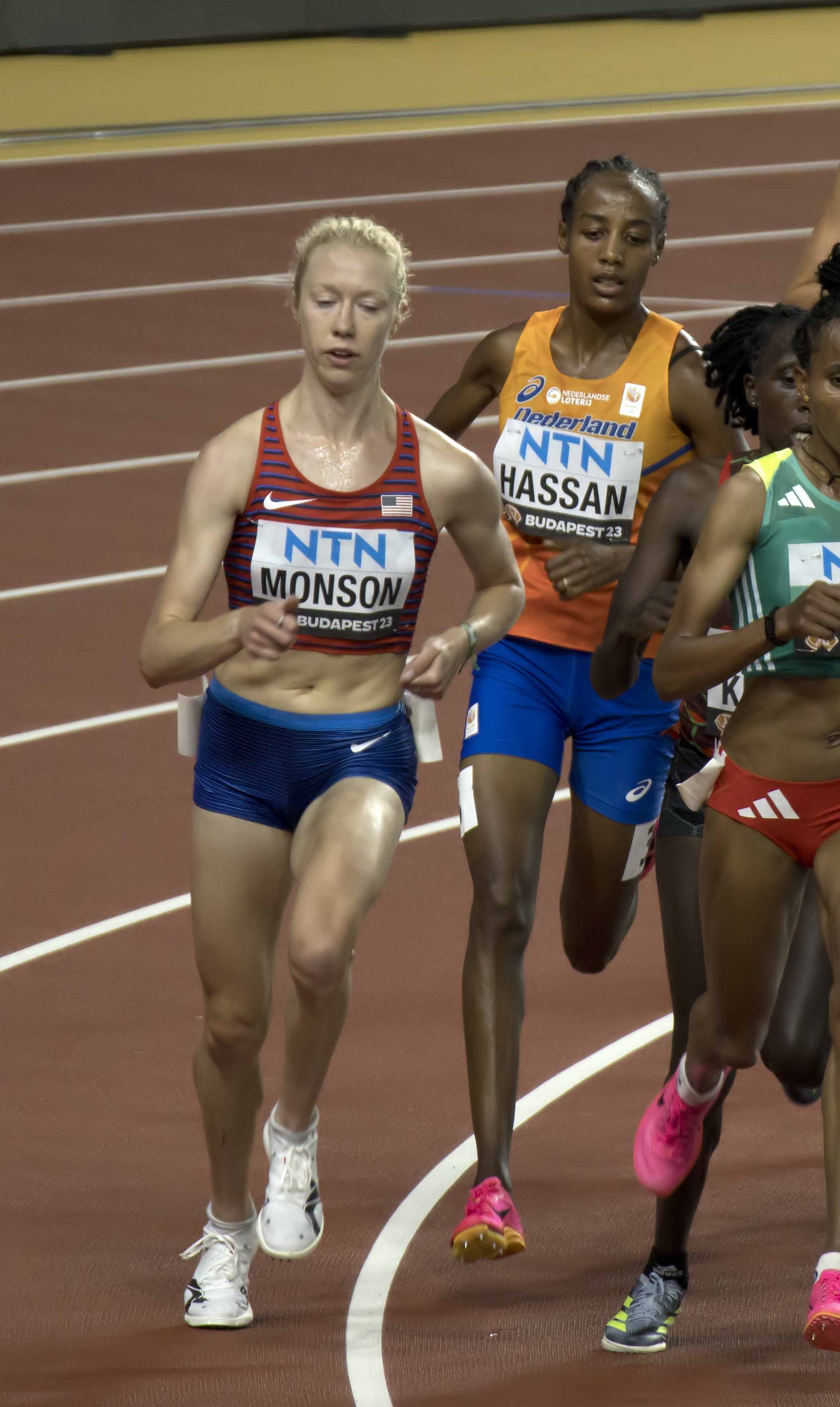
Monson competing at the 2023 World Championships

On July 23, competing at the London Diamond League, Monson ran a new American record time for the 5000m, clocking 14:19.45 to break Shelby Houlihan's previous record time of 14:23.92. After second-place finishes in the 5000 m and 10,000 m at the US Championships, she was selected to contest both events at the 2023 World Athletics Championships in Budapest in August. In Budapest, she finished fifth in the 10,000 m, the highest finish for an American since Emily Infeld's bronze in 2015. In the 5000 m, she qualified for the final where she placed 14th in a time of 15:04.08.

=== 2024 ===
On February 11, at the Millrose Games, she set a new US national record over two miles, running 9:09.70 to eclipse the previous best set by Elle Purrier St. Pierre.

On March 16, Monson competed in the TEN in San Juan Capistrano, aiming to break her own American 10,000 m record set the previous year. She stayed with the pace for just the first few kilometers, before fading and eventually dropping out of the race, later citing stomach issues as her reason for doing so. In April 2024, she announced she had had surgery on her knee meniscus and would miss the remainder of the season including the 2024 Paris Olympics.

=== 2025 ===
She returned to action with a time of 15:01.63 for the 5000 metres at the Sunset Tour Los Angeles on 12 July 2025.

== Achievements ==
=== International competitions ===
Representing United States
Year	Competition	Venue	Position	Event	Time
2021	Summer Olympics	Japan National Stadium	13th	10,000 m	31:21.36
2022	World Indoor Championships	Štark Arena	7th	3000 m	8:46.39
2022	World Championships	Hayward Field	13th	10,000 m	30:59.85
2023	World Championships	National Athletics Centre	14th	5000 m	15:04.08
2023	World Championships	National Athletics Centre	5th	10,000 m	31:32.29

=== Personal bests ===
- 1500 meters – 4:07.09 (Portland, OR 2021)
  - 1500 meters indoor – 4:06.38 (New York, NY 2023)
- 3000 meters – 8:26.81 (Lausanne 2022)
  - 3000 meters indoor – 8:25.05 (New York, NY 2023) North American record
- 5000 meters – 14:19.45 (London 2023) North American record
  - 5000 meters indoor – 15:31.26 (Birmingham 2019)
- 10,000 meters – 30:03.82 (San Juan Capistrano, CA 2023) North American record
- 5 km – 14:38 (Zürich 2022)
