= On (company) =

Swiss athletic shoe and sportswear company

On Holding AG
- Type: Public
- Traded as: NYSE: ONON
- Industry: Sportswear; Sports equipment
- Founded: January 2010; 16 years ago
- Founders: Olivier Bernhard; David Allemann; Caspar Coppetti
- Headquarters: Zürich, Switzerland
- Area served: Worldwide
- Products: Athletic shoes
- Revenue: ▲CHF 2.32 billion (2024)
- Operating income: ▲CHF 212 million (2024)
- Net income: ▲CHF 242 million (2024)
- Total assets: ▲CHF 2.38 billion (2024)
- Total equity: ▲CHF 1.39 billion (2024)
- Number of employees: 3,254 (2024)
- Parent: On Holding AG
- Website: on.com

On Holding AG is a Swiss athletic shoe and performance sportswear company that designs and markets sports clothing and running shoes.

In 2019, On products were sold in 6,000 retailers in 55 countries and the company held 40% of the running shoe market in Switzerland and 10% in Germany. The United States is its biggest single market, where it accounts for 6.6% of the performance running shoe category. Globally, as of 2024, On is estimated to have 2% of the athletic footwear market. As of 2025, On is on its way to a $20 billion market cap, continually growing year-over-year.

== History ==
On was first incorporated as a running shoe company in January 2010. The company was founded by former Swiss Ironman champion Olivier Bernhard with David Allemann and Caspar Coppetti. In 2012, On released the Cloudracer, a performance shoe favoured by Swiss professional triathlete Nicola Spirig. The company claims a proprietary cushioning technology called CloudTec in its shoes.

CloudTec began with Bernhard experimenting with a garden hose, exploring how that shape could offer a brand new type of cushioning. Bernhard, who was a Nike athlete at the time, presented his prototype to Nike but had it rejected. The "clouds" underneath all On shoes are described by the manufacturer as offering cushioning as the foot lands on the floor, before locking together to create a solid foundation for pushing off on the next step.

Within 2 years after its initial public offering (IPO), On had doubled its revenue to nearly $2 billion.

=== Roger Federer's involvement ===
Swiss tennis professional Roger Federer became a shareholder in On AG in November 2019. The company released a limited edition lifestyle shoe named "The Roger" in July 2020. Based on sales growth the company was reported to be exploring IPO options for the latter half of 2021. In September 2021, the company's IPO raised approximately $746 million.

Since 2021, On is a listed stock on the NYSE.

=== Lightspray ===
The Cloudboom Strike LS is a performance running shoe launched for the 2024 Olympic Games. It uses an upper construction method called Lightspray (LS), in which a single, continuous filament of synthetic material is robotically deposited to create a lightweight and form-fitting upper. Weighing only 6 ounces (170 g), the shoe is comparable in weight to the Nike ZoomX Streakfly.

This upper construction reduces the shoe's required components from 150-200 to seven. The shoe is also promoted for its reduced environmental impact through minimized waste and potential for on-demand manufacturing.

== Management ==
From January 2021 to March 2025, Marc Maurer and Martin Hoffmann jointly served as Co-CEOs until April 2025 when Hoffmann assumed the sole CEO role. Martin Hoffmann held the role of Chief Financial Officer since joining the company in 2013.

The company's founders remain actively involved: David Allemann and Caspar Coppetti serve as Executive Co-Chairmen. Olivier Bernhard focuses on product and innovation.

== Operations ==
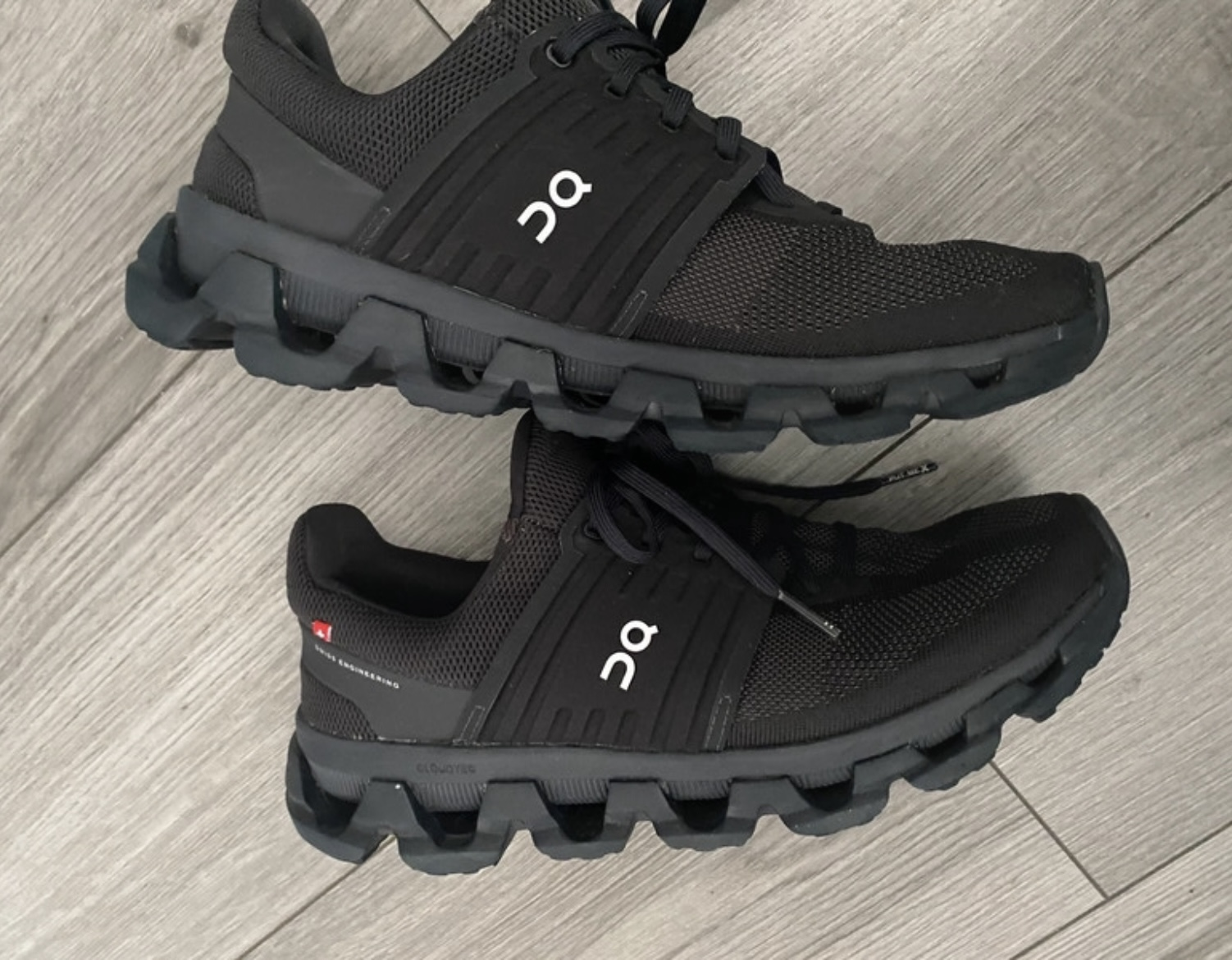
A pair of On Cloud running shoes, depicting the Flag of Switzerland at the heels

On also founded and sponsors the professional running group, On Athletics Club, coached by Dathan Ritzenhein with a roster that contains multiple Olympic finalists. The company also built bobsleigh shoes that were used in the 2022 Winter Olympics.

Currently, David Kilgore, an American professional runner and record holder, competes and works for On Running.

On March 31, 2022, On launched the Cloudmonster. It deviates from the company's previous designs by having a larger sole. Jacob Gallagher of The Wall Street Journal described it as "a maximalist sneaker" and claimed that this design is primarily associated with Hoka, and called Hoka "one of On's main competitors in the specialized running market".

The production of On shoes has been moved from China to Indonesia and Vietnam.

== Sponsorships ==
Over the years, On has significantly expanded its athlete endorsements across multiple sports. In track and field, the brand established the On Athletics Club (OAC), an elite international training initiative supporting middle- and long-distance runners such as Hellen Obiri and Yared Nuguse.

The company also established a major presence in professional tennis by signing multiple competitors, including former multi-time Grand Slam champion Roger Federer (who was given equity in the company), multi-time Grand Slam champion Iga Świątek, US Open finalist Ben Shelton, Roland Garros finalist Flavio Cobolli and ATP young star João Fonseca. Additionally, On maintains a diverse roster of sponsored talent spanning endurance trail running, ultra-marathons, and professional triathlon.

On 18 September 2026, On announced French football superstar Kylian Mbappé as its Global Ambassador to lead its push into the sport; after representing Nike since 2006, as part of the deal, Mbappé received equity in the company. Although working behind the scenes with On's football department development since 2025, former France international and Arsenal player Thierry Henry was officially announced as director of football on the same day. Swiss women's national team player Sydney Schertenleib became the Female Football Brand Ambassador and special advisor for the brand.

== See also ==
- adidas
- Anta Sports
- Li-Ning
