= Dathan Ritzenhein =

American long-distance runner

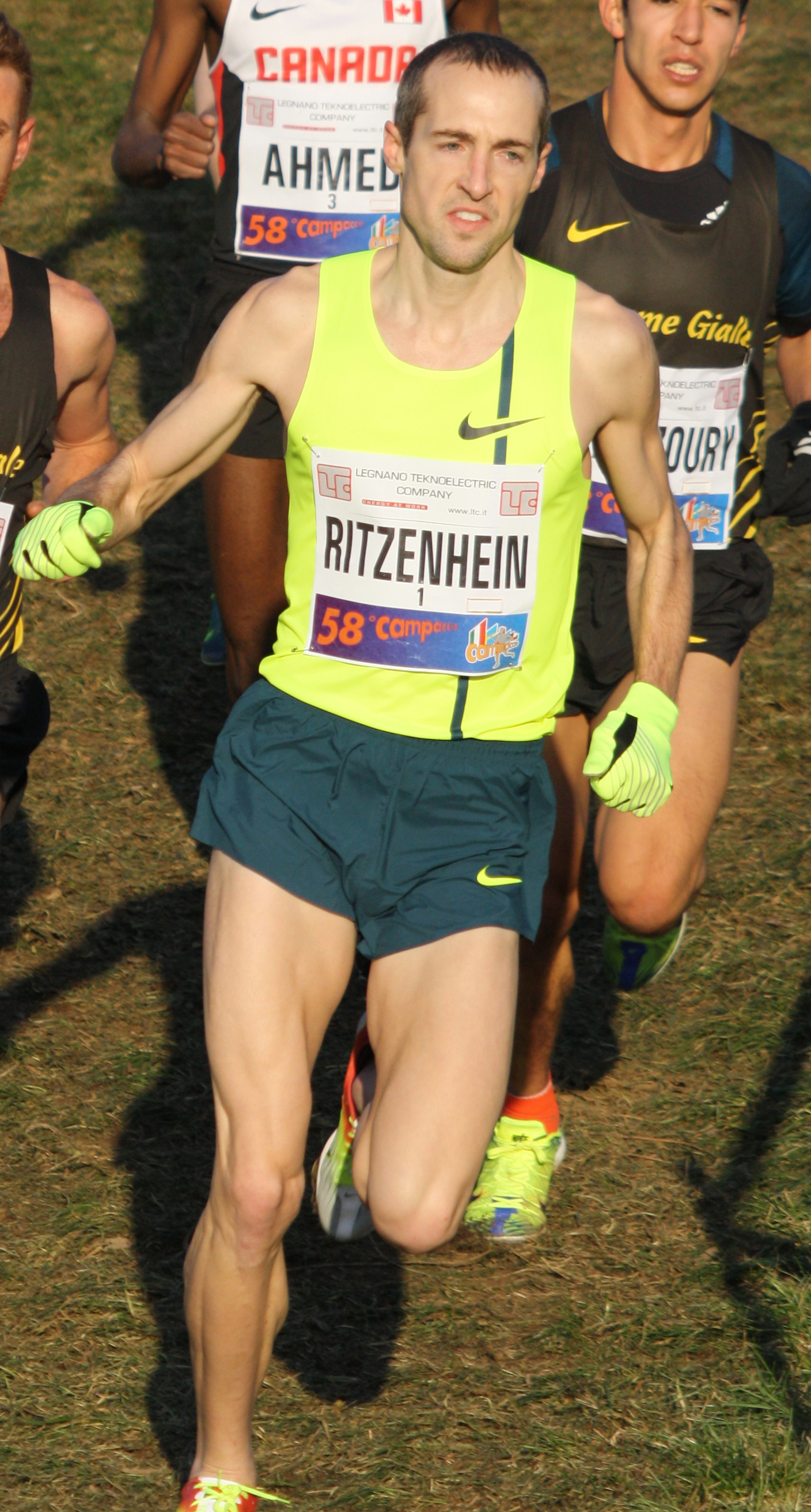
- Ritzenhein in 2015

Personal information
- Full name: Dathan James Ritzenhein
- Born: December 30, 1982 (age 43) Grand Rapids, Michigan, U.S.
- Height: 5 ft 8 in (173 cm)
- Spouse: Kalin Toedebusch
- Children: 2

Sport
- Sport: Cross country, Track and field, Distance running
- Events: Marathon, Half marathon, 10,000 meters, 5000 meters
- College team: Colorado Buffaloes
- Turned pro: 2004

Achievements and titles
- Olympic finals: 2004; 10,000 m, DNF; 2008; Marathon, 9th 2012; 10,000 m, 13th
- World finals: 2007; 10,000 m, 9th 2009; 10,000 m, 6th 2013; 10,000 m, 10th
- Personal bests: 1500 m: 3:42.99; 3000 m: 7:39.03; 2-mile: 8:11.74; 5000 m: 12:56.27; 10,000 m: 27:22.28; Half marathon: 60:00; Marathon: 2:07:47
Medal record
World Half Marathon Championships
Bronze medal – third place	2009 Birmingham	Individual
World Cross Country Championships
Bronze medal – third place	2001 Ostende	Junior race

Dathan James Ritzenhein (born December 30, 1982) is an American retired long-distance runner and current head coach of the On Athletics Club (OAC). He held the American record in the 5,000 meters (12:56.27) from 2009 to 2010, until it was broken by Bernard Lagat. He is a three-time Olympian and a three-time national cross-country champion. He also finished as the top American at the 2013 Chicago Marathon and the 2015 Boston Marathon.

Formerly a Nike athlete for the majority of his professional career, Ritzenhein joined the Hansons-Brooks Distance Project team in 2017. In early May 2020, he announced his retirement from competition. He signed with the Swiss shoe brand On shortly thereafter in June 2020 and serves as head coach of the On Athletics Club in Boulder, Colorado.

Ritzenhein was a standout runner at Rockford High School in Michigan and the University of Colorado at Boulder. He was part of the high school class of 2001, which also produced distance runners Alan Webb and Ryan Hall.

== Running career ==
=== High school ===
Ritzenhein ("Ritz") attended Rockford High School. Ritz set numerous state and national high school records during this time, including in the 1600m (4:05.9), 3200m (8:41.10), and 5000m (13:44.70). He won back-to-back regional (Midwest) and national titles in the Foot Locker high school championship races in the fall of 1999 and 2000. In the 2000 Foot Locker Championship in Orlando, Florida, Ritz defeated Webb and Hall, winning the 5-kilometer run in a time of 14:35, six seconds behind the course record he set the year prior. As a senior in high school, he set the Michigan high school 5 km cross country record of 14:10 at the state finals, beating the previous record by one minute. His final cross-country race in high school was at the IAAF Junior World Cross-Country Championships in Ostend, Belgium, where he won a bronze medal.

Ritzenhein made his marathon debut in the 2006 ING New York City Marathon, finishing in 11th place with a time of 2:14:01. Ritzenhein finished second in 2:11:07 at the 2008 Olympic Marathon Trials, which automatically placed him on Team USA for the Beijing Olympics. In the 2008 Olympic Marathon, Ritzenhein was the first American runner to cross the finish line, finishing ninth with a time of 2:11:59. His teammate, Ryan Hall, finished just behind him in 10th place.

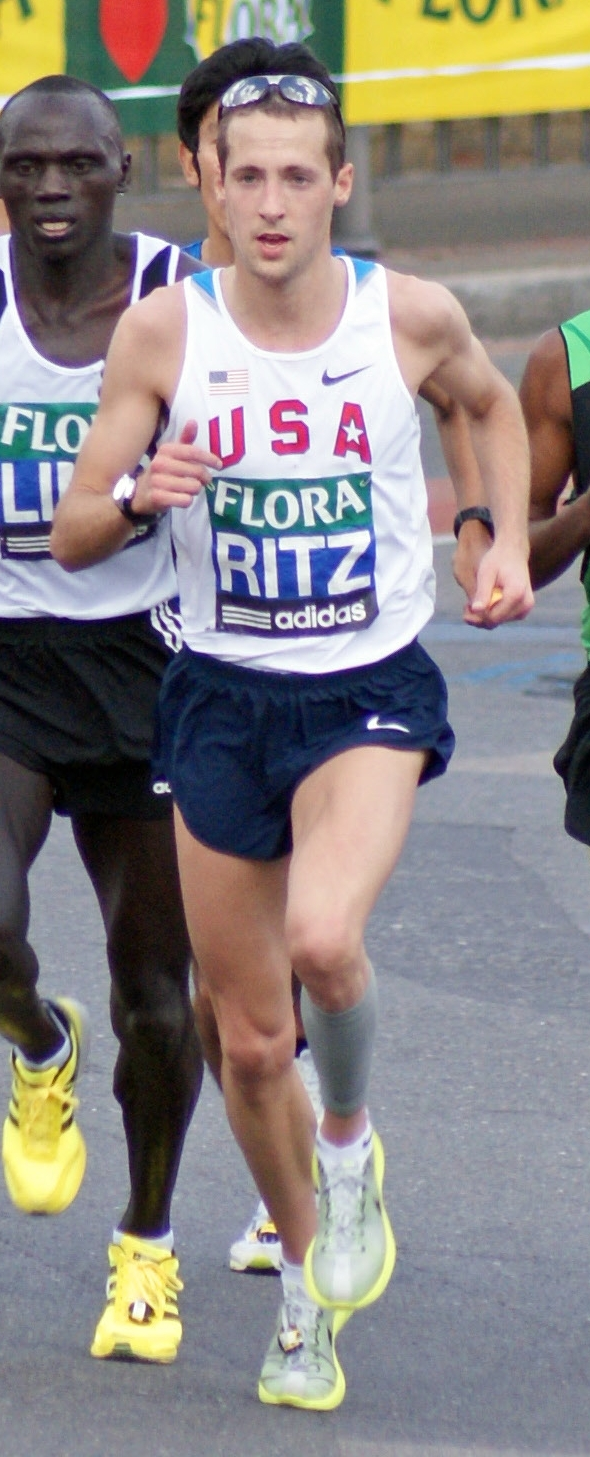
Ritzenhein at the 2009 London Marathon

In January 2009, Ritzenhein placed second at the U.S. Half Marathon Championship. Three months later, he set a personal best at the 2009 London Marathon, finishing 11th in 2:10:00. In May 2009, Ritzenhein and longtime coach Brad Hudson parted ways. He moved from Eugene to Portland, Oregon, in order to train with Alberto Salazar's Nike Oregon Project.

On August 17, 2009, Ritzenhein placed sixth in the 10,000 meters at the World Championships in Berlin, Germany, where he set a personal best of 27:22.28. Eleven days later at the Weltklasse Meeting in Zurich, Switzerland, Ritzenhein placed third in the 5,000 meters, setting a new American record with a time of 12:56.27, becoming the third American to run under 13 minutes. At the 2009 Half Marathon Championships in Birmingham, Ritzenhein placed third with a time of 60:00, which was then the second-fastest American time ever, behind Ryan Hall's 59:43.

In the January 2012 Olympic Marathon Trials, Ritzenhein ran a personal best of 2:09:55 but placed fourth, missing a spot on the US Marathon Team by eight seconds behind the third-place finisher Abdi Abdirahman. On the evening of June 22, 2012, Ritzenhein placed third in the US Olympic Trials in the 10,000 meters and achieved the Olympic 'A' standard of 27:45.00. In poor conditions, Ritz and his teammate Galen Rupp worked together to pace the race for the first 5000 meters, with Rupp pulling away in the final three laps to win the national title. On August 4, 2012, at the 2012 London Olympics, Ritzenhein finished thirteenth in the 10,000 m finals. After the Olympics, he ran at the Philadelphia Half Marathon and came third, running a time of 1:00:57, which was the fastest by an American that year. At the 2012 Chicago Marathon, Ritzenhein finished in ninth, setting a new personal best of 2:07:47.

On May 9, 2014, Ritzenhein announced that he would leave the Nike Oregon Project to move closer to his hometown of Grand Rapids, Michigan. He was sponsored by Brooks.

On February 13, 2016, Ritz dropped out of the 2016 US Olympic Marathon Trials. Ritzenhein retired from professional running in May 2020. In an interview with Flotrack, he reflected on his 16-year career. He stated: "I guess I'm not necessarily 25 and retiring in my prime. I have things that I wish that I have done in my career, but I'm also very satisfied, too. I think right now it's something that I thought a lot about the last year. I've had a lot of nostalgic moments, looking back a lot more than looking forward. So, I don't know that I had a lot more goals that I was looking to accomplish."

During his career, Ritzenhein regularly trained at St-Moritz, Switzerland, at 5,900 ft (1800 m) above sea level, to prepare for his major competitions.

== Coaching career ==
In August 2020, Ritzenhein was named the head coach of the newly formed On Athletics Club, based in Boulder, Colorado. Notable OAC athletes include Hellen Obiri, Yared Nuguse, Geordie Beamish, and Oliver Hoare.

== Personal life ==
Ritzenhein is married to Rockford native and former University of Colorado distance runner Kalin Toedebusch. The two have a daughter, Addison (born 2008), and a son, Jude (born 2011).
