= IAU 100 km European Championships =

- Sport: Ultramarathon
- First season: 1992
- Website: iau-ultramarathon.org

The IAU 100 km European Championships is an annual, ultrarunning competition over 100 kilometres (60 miles) for European athletes. It is organised by the International Association of Ultrarunners (IAU) and was first held in 1992 – five years after the launched of the World Championships for the distance. The competition features both an individual and national team component. The team race is decided by aggregated the three best times set by a nation's athletes.

In its 22nd edition in 2013, a total of 94 athletes representing 19 countries took part in the competition. Winschoten in the Netherlands has been a frequent host of the event, doing so ten times, including the first three editions. (In other years, the area has held an annual race there – Run Winschoten.) The championships has almost exclusively been contested in Western Europe, with the sole exception being the 2003 event in Russia. The editions of the competition from 2007 to 2012 were jointly held alongside the World Championships, with the European athletes within that race being ranked separately for the continental event.

The most successful athletes of the championships are Giorgio Calcaterra of Italy and Jonas Buud of Sweden. Each has won the men's title three times, as well as having won a silver and a bronze. Three-time champion Jaroslaw Janicki of Poland is the next most successful and Kajsa Berg is the only woman to have won the championships three times. The championship records are 6:16:41 hours for men, set by Belgian Jean-Paul Praet in 1992, and 7:19:51 hours for women, achieved by Tatyana Zhirkova of Russia in 2003. Russia is comfortably the most successful nation of the championships with nine women's gold medals and eight men's gold medals. Italian and Swedish athletes are the next best performers with six titles each. A total of seventeen European nations have reached the podium.

After being held annually from 1992 to 2013, the event switched to being held on a semi-annual basis. Following the 2015 edition, there were no bids to host the 2017 or 2019 editions so both were cancelled. As of 2024, the event has not been held since 2015, though there are scheduled European 100 km championships in 2025 and 2027.

== Editions ==
Edition	Year	City	Country	Date	No. of athletes	No. of nations
1st	1992	Winschoten	Netherlands	16 February		
2nd	1993	Winschoten	Netherlands	18 September		
3rd	1994	Winschoten	Netherlands	3 September		
4th	1995	Chavagnes-en-Paillers	France	27 May		
5th	1996	Cléder	France	25 August		
6th	1997	Faenza	Italy	31 May		
7th	1998	Torhout	Belgium	19 June		
8th	1999	Winschoten	Netherlands	11 September		
9th	2000	Belvès	France	30 April		
10th	2001	Winschoten	Netherlands	29 September		
11th	2002	Winschoten	Netherlands	14 September		
12th	2003	Chernogolovka	Russia	19 April		
13th	2004	Faenza	Italy	29 May		
14th	2005	Winschoten	Netherlands	10 September		
15th	2006	Torhout	Belgium	16 June		
16th	2007	Winschoten	Netherlands	8 September		
17th	2008	Tarquinia	Italy	8 November		
18th	2009	Torhout	Belgium	19 June		
19th	2010	Gibraltar	Gibraltar	7 November		
20th	2011	Winschoten	Netherlands	10 September		
21st	2012	Seregno	Italy	22 April		
22nd	2013	Belvès	France	27 April	94	19
23rd	2015	Winschoten	Netherlands	12 September		

== Medal summary ==
=== Men ===
Year	Gold		Silver		Bronze	
1992	Jean-Paul Praet (BEL)	6:16:41	Bruno Scelsi (FRA)	6:42:40	Aleksandr Masarygin (RUS)	6:44:20
1993	Konstantin Santalov (RUS)	6:25:52	Peter Hermans (BEL)	6:33:57	Mikhail Kokorev (RUS)	6:36:38
1994	Jaroslaw Janicki (POL)	6:33:43	Andrzej Magier (POL)	6:33:43	Denis Gack (FRA)	6:37:47
1995	Jaroslaw Janicki (POL)	6:28:38	Igor Ryabov (RUS)	6:30:04	Andrzej Magier (POL)	6:35:37
1996	Jaroslaw Janicki (POL)	6:33:39	Jiří Jelínek (CZE)	6:38:15	Andrzej Magier (POL)	6:39:49
1997	Aleksey Kononev (RUS)	6:47:35	Grigoriy Murzin (RUS)	6:47:39	Nikolay Buskarov (RUS)	6:47:57
1998	Grigoriy Murzin (RUS)	6:23:28	Dmitriy Radyuchenko (RUS)	6:34:40	Nikolay Buskarov (RUS)	6:40:45
1999	Pascal Fetizon (FRA)	6:39:16	Mikhail Kokorev (RUS)	6:42:18	Gilles Diehl (FRA)	6:44:39
2000	Farid Ganiyev (RUS)	6:33:36	Piotr Sekowski (POL)	6:44:28	Oleg Kharitonov (RUS)	6:47:00
2001	Vladimir Netreba (RUS)	6:45:43	Attila Vozar (HUN)	6:47:57	Mirko Vindiš (SLO)	6:52:47
2002	Pascal Fetizon (FRA)	6:34:16	Denis Zhalybin (RUS)	6:36:21	Oleg Kharitonov (RUS)	6:41:18
2003	Farid Ganiyev (RUS)	6:28:27	Grigoriy Murzin (RUS)	6:29:41	Mario Ardemagni (ITA)	6:33:22
2004	Mario Ardemagni (ITA)	6:31:44.7	Fermin Martinez (ESP)	6:48:07.0	Simon Pride (GBR)	6:48:47.7
2005	Oleg Kharitonov (RUS)	6:30:31	Mario Ardemagni (ITA)	6:40:39	Pascal Fetizon (FRA)	6:50:22
2006	Jose Maria Gonzales (ESP)	6:23:44	Dmitriy Bula (BLR)	6:33:56	Yannick Djouadi (FRA)	6:38:19
2007	Oleg Kharitonov (RUS)	6:30:22	Igor Tyazhkorov (RUS)	6:42:36	Aleksey Izmaylov (RUS)	6:45:11
2008	Giorgio Calcaterra (ITA)	6:37:41	Jaroslaw Janicki (POL)	6:40:44	Miguel Ángel Jiménez (ESP)	6:53:44
2009	Jonas Buud (SWE)	6:41:50	Giorgio Calcaterra (ITA)	6:42:05	Marco Boffo (ITA)	6:45:39
2010	Jonas Buud (SWE)	6:47:40	Aleksandr Holovnitskiy (UKR)	6:51:03	Andre Collet (GER)	6:51:54
2011	Giorgio Calcaterra (ITA)	6:27:32	Pieter Vermeesch (BEL)	6:47:01	Jonas Buud (SWE)	6:52:19
2012	Giorgio Calcaterra (ITA)	6:23:22	Jonas Buud (SWE)	6:28:59	Alberico diCecco (ITA)	6:40:32
2013	Asier Cuevas Ettcheto (ESP)	6:53:14	Mickaël Boch (FRA)	6:56:49	Jose-Antonio Requejo Santos (ESP)	6:57:02
2015	Jonas Buud (SWE)	6:22:44	Asier Cuevas Ettcheto (ESP)	6:35:49	Giorgio Calcaterra (ITA)	6:36:49

=== Women ===
Year	Gold		Silver		Bronze	
1992	Hilary Walker (GBR)	7:55:12	Viviane VanderHaeghen (BEL)	7:59:19	Eleanor Robinson (GBR)	8:06:18
1993	Marta Vass (HUN)	7:43:16	Hilary Walker (GBR)	7:50:09	Eleanor Robinson (GBR)	8:02:24
1994	Valentina Lyakhova (RUS)	7:36:39	Nursiya Bagmanova (RUS)	7:52:59	Elena Bikulova (RUS)	7:46:35
1995	Isabelle Olive (FRA)	7:43:14	Lynn Harding (GBR)	7:52:23	Daniele Geffroy (FRA)	7:54:10
1996	Carolyn Hunter-Rowe (GBR)	7:41:29	Martine Cubizolles (FRA)	7:49:09	Huguette Jouault (FRA)	7:51:54
1997	Olga Lapina (RUS)	8:13:49	Jutta Philippin (GER)	8:20:07	Sybille Möllensiep (GER)	8:23:42
1998	Svetlana Savoskina (RUS)	7:45:43	Alziria Lario (POR)	7:58:36	Elena Bikulova (RUS)	8:05:03
1999	Elvira Kolpakova (RUS)	7:33:39	Magali Reymonencq (FRA)	7:55:35	Elena Bikulova (RUS)	8:05:03
2000	Edit Bérces (HUN)	7:53:12	Karine Herry (FRA)	8:06:46	Alziria Lario (POR)	8:16:53
2001	Ricarda Botzon (GER)	7:31:55	Marina Bychkova (RUS)	7:37:02	Karine Herry (FRA)	7:42:36
2002	Elvira Kolpakova (RUS)	7:24:52	Monica Casiraghi (ITA)	7:33:14	Danielle Sanderson (GBR)	7:47:30
2003	Tatyana Zhirkova (RUS)	7:19:51	Monica Casiraghi (ITA)	7:28:00	Elena Nurgalyeva (RUS)	7:31:14
2004	Monica Casiraghi (ITA)	8:03.03.8	Karine Herry (FRA)	8:19:08.3	Magali Reymonencq (FRA)	8:26:52.6
2005	Monica Casiraghi (ITA)	7:53:25	Birgit Schönherr (GER)	7:53:28	Karine Herry (FRA)	7:55:53
2006	Birgit Schönherr (GER)	7:58:44	Laurence Klein (FRA)	7:59:22	Christine Lelan (FRA)	8:01:54
2007	Laurence Klein (FRA)	7:26:44	Marina Myschlyanova (RUS)	7:39:20	Monica Carlin (ITA)	7:40:38
2008	Tatyana Zhirkova (RUS)	7:23:33	Monica Carlin (ITA)	7:35:38	Irina Vishnevskaya (RUS)	7:38:40
2009	Irina Vishnevskaya (RUS)	7:46:26	Monica Carlin (ITA)	7:53:58	Helena Crossan (IRL)	8:04:40
2010	Ellie Greenwood (GBR)	7:29:05	Monica Carlin (ITA)	7:30:50	Lizzy Hawker (GBR)	7:33:26
2011	Marina Bychkova (RUS)	7:27:19	Joanna Zakrzewski (GBR)	7:41:06	Irina Vishnevskaya (RUS)	7:45:27
2012	Kajsa Berg (SWE)	7:35:23	Irina Vishnevskaya (RUS)	7:36:01	Judit Földing-Nagy (HUN)	7:43:55
2013	Kajsa Berg (SWE)	7:38:52	Irina Antopova (RUS)	7:42:52	Susan Harrison (GBR)	7:48:12
2015	Kajsa Berg (SWE)	7:20:48	Marija Vrajic (CRO)	7:27:11	Joasia Zakrzewski (GBR)	7:31:33

=== Men team ===
Year	Gold		Silver		Bronze	
1992	Russia (RUS)	20:11:47	Belgium (BEL)	20:34:10	Great Britain (GBR)	21:21:20
1993	Great Britain (GBR)	20:26:56	France (FRA)	20:40:50	Germany (GER)	21:50:29
1994	Poland (POL)	20:05:20	Russia (RUS)	20:16:06	France (FRA)	20:32:17
1995	Russia (RUS)	19:52:19	Poland (POL)	19:58:12	France (FRA)	20:09:00
1996	Poland (POL)	20:04:53	France (FRA)	20:41:32	Spain (ESP)	21:19:01
1997	Russia (RUS)	20:23:11	Spain (ESP)	21:30:55	Great Britain (GBR)	22:09:47
1998	Russia (RUS)	19:55:31	Belgium (BEL)	20:54:52	France (FRA)	21:05:29
1999	France (FRA)	20:32:25	Russia (RUS)	21:31:41	Spain (ESP)	23:18:28
2000	Russia (RUS)	20:15:04	France (FRA)	21:04:04	Belgium (BEL)	21:25:52
2001	Russia (RUS)	21:56:03	Ukraine (UKR)	22:08:33	Belgium (BEL)	22:12:34
2002	Russia (RUS)	20:13:04	France (FRA)	20:44:51	Italy (ITA)	21:13:28
2003	Russia (RUS)	20:20:00	France (FRA)	21:04:44	Italy (ITA)	21:11:41
2004	Italy (ITA)	20:40:33	Russia (RUS)	21:15:58	Great Britain (GBR)	21:28:35
2005	Russia (RUS)	20:21:40	France (FRA)	20:56:35	Germany (GER)	21:19:12
2006	Spain (ESP)	20:00:24	France (FRA)	20:11:58	Russia (RUS)	20:33:59
2007	[[|]] ()		[[|]] ()		[[|]] ()	
2008	[[|]] ()		[[|]] ()		[[|]] ()	
2009	[[|]] ()		[[|]] ()		[[|]] ()	
2010	[[|]] ()		[[|]] ()		[[|]] ()	
2011	[[|]] ()		[[|]] ()		[[|]] ()	
2012	[[|]] ()		[[|]] ()		[[|]] ()	
2013	[[|]] ()		[[|]] ()		[[|]] ()	
2015	[[|]] ()		[[|]] ()		[[|]] ()	

=== Women team ===
Year	Gold		Silver		Bronze	
1992	Great Britain (GBR)	24:22:24	Only one finishing team			
1993	Great Britain (GBR)	24:53:32	Hungary (HUN)	26:14:55	France (FRA)	26:30:24
1994	Russia (RUS)	23:37:51	France (FRA)	25:44:24	Germany (GER)	26:18:39
1995	France (FRA)	23:39:02	Great Britain (GBR)	24:21:39	Germany (GER)	24:44:43
1996	France (FRA)	23:40:35	Germany (GER)	24:40:51	Great Britain (GBR)	24:50:39
1997	Germany (GER)	25:12:09	Russia (RUS)	25:27:31	Great Britain (GBR)	27:05:26
1998	Russia (RUS)	24:03:03	Germany (GER)	25:18:40	France (FRA)	25:19:57
1999	Germany (GER)	24:54:03	France (FRA)	26:24:39	Ukraine (UKR)	27:58:44
2000	France (FRA)	25:02:12	Italy (ITA)	29:13:48	Only two finishing teams	
2001	Russia (RUS)	23:37:49	France (FRA)	23:42:22	Germany (GER)	23:52:00
2002	Russia (RUS)	23:57:55	Italy (ITA)	24:30:45	France (FRA)	24:58:48
2003	Russia (RUS)	22:28:13	France (FRA)	24:11:50	Italy (ITA)	24:33:48
2004	Italy (ITA)	25:22:14	Germany (GER)	26:08:09	France (FRA)	27:08:55
2005	France (FRA)	24:11:24	Germany (GER)	24:37:14	Italy (ITA)	25:30:58
2006	France (FRA)	24:14:37	Germany (GER)	24:57:00	Italy (ITA)	27:32:07
2007	[[|]] ()		[[|]] ()		[[|]] ()	
2008	[[|]] ()		[[|]] ()		[[|]] ()	
2009	[[|]] ()		[[|]] ()		[[|]] ()	
2010	[[|]] ()		[[|]] ()		[[|]] ()	
2011	[[|]] ()		[[|]] ()		[[|]] ()	
2012	[[|]] ()		[[|]] ()		[[|]] ()	
2013	[[|]] ()		[[|]] ()		[[|]] ()	
2015	[[|]] ()		[[|]] ()		[[|]] ()	

== Medal table ==
=== Individual race ===
Rank	Nation	Gold	Silver	Bronze	Total
1	Russia (RUS)	17	11	13	41
2	Italy (ITA)	6	7	5	18
3	Sweden (SWE)	6	1	1	8
4	France (FRA)	3	7	10	20
5	Great Britain (GBR)	3	3	7	13
6	Poland (POL)	3	3	2	8
7	Germany (GER)	2	2	2	6
7	Spain (ESP)	2	2	2	6
9	Hungary (HUN)	2	1	1	4
10	Belgium (BEL)	1	3	0	4
11	Portugal (POR)	0	1	1	2
12	Belarus (BLR)	0	1	0	1
12	Croatia (CRO)	0	1	0	1
12	Czech Republic (CZE)	0	1	0	1
12	Ukraine (UKR)	0	1	0	1
16	Ireland (IRL)	0	0	1	1
16	Slovenia (SLO)	0	0	1	1
Totals (17 entries)		45	45	46	136
