= IAU 100 km World Championships =

Ultra running competition

- Most recent season or competition: 2024 IAU 100 km World Championship
- Sport: Ultramarathon
- First season: 1987
- Country: Worldwide
- Website: https://iau-ultramarathon.org/

The IAU 100 km World Championships have been held annually since 1987, at different locations, and is organized by the International Association of Ultrarunners (IAU). Due to lack of sponsorship, the 2013 event, planned for Jeju Island, South Korea, was cancelled and the 2014 event, originally due to be held at Daugavpils, Latvia, was held instead in Doha, Qatar.

The championships from 2007 to 2012 incorporated the IAU 100 km European Championships.

== Editions ==
=== Men ===
#	Year	Location	Gold	Silver	Bronze
1st	1987	(Belgium) Torhout	(Spain) Domingo Catalán	(United Kingdom) Don Ritchie	(France) Roland Vuillemenot
2nd	1988	(Spain) Santander	(Spain) Domingo Catalán	(France) Jean-Marc Bellocq	(France) Bruno Scelsi
3rd	1989	(France) Rambouillet	(France) Bruno Scelsi	(Netherlands) Bruno Joppen	(West Germany) Herbert Cuntz
4th	1990	(United States) Duluth	(France) Roland Vuillemenot	(New Zealand) Russell Prince	(Canada) Stefan Fekner
5th	1991	(Italy) Faenza	(Brazil) Valmir Nunes	(France) Roland Vuillemenot	(France) Jean-Marc Bellocq
6th	1992	(Spain) Palamós	(Russia) Konstantin Santalov	(Spain) Domingo Catalán	(United Kingdom) Erik Seedhouse
7th	1993	(Belgium) Torhout	(Russia) Konstantin Santalov	(Belgium) Peter Hermanns	(South Africa) Cornet Mantonane
8th	1994	(Japan) Saroma	(Russia) Aleksey Volgin	(Poland) Jarosław Janicki	(Germany) Kazimierz Bak
9th	1995	(Netherlands) Winschoten	(Brazil) Valmir Nunes	(Russia) Aleksey Volgin	(United States) Tom Johnson
10th	1996	(Russia) Moscow	(Russia) Konstantin Santalov	(Poland) Jarosław Janicki	(Russia) Aleksey Kruglikov
11th	1997	(Netherlands) Winschoten	(Ukraine) Sergey Yanenko	(Russia) Mikhail Kokorev	(Poland) Andrzej Magier
12th	1998	(Japan) Shimanto	(Russia) Grigoriy Murzin	(Russia) Igor Tyupin	(Russia) Ravil Kashapov
13th	1999	(France) Chavagnes-en-Paillers	(United Kingdom) Simon Pride	(France) Thierry Guichard	(Japan) Takahiro Sunada
14th	2000	(Netherlands) Winschoten	(France) Pascal Fétizon	(Russia) Dmitriy Radyuchenko	(Russia) Oleg Kharitonov
15th	2001	(France) Cléder	(Japan) Yasufumi Mikami	(United States) Rich Hanna	(France) Pascal Fétizon
16th	2002	(Belgium) Torhout	(Italy) Mario Fattore	(Russia) Igor Tyazhkorob	(Spain) Fermín Martínez
17th	2003	(Taiwan) Tainan	(Italy) Mario Fattore	(Russia) Grigoriy Murzin	(Germany) Michael Sommer
18th	2004	(Netherlands) Winschoten	(Italy) Mario Ardemagni	(Poland) Jarosław Janicki	(Russia) Oleg Kharitonov
19th	2005	(Japan) Saroma	(Russia) Grigoriy Murzin	(Spain) Jorge Aubeso	(Japan) Tsutomu Sassa
20th	2006	(South Korea) Misari	(France) Yannick Djouadi	(Russia) Oleg Kharitonov	(Russia) Denis Zhalybin
21st	2007	(Netherlands) Winschoten	(Japan) Shinichi Watanabe	(Japan) Kenji Nakanishi	(Russia) Oleg Kharitonov
22nd	2008	(Italy) Rome	(Italy) Giorgio Calcaterra	(Poland) Jarosław Janicki	(Spain) Miguel Ángel Jiménez
23rd	2009	(Belgium) Torhout	(Japan) Yasukazu Miyazato	(Sweden) Jonas Buud	(Italy) Giorgio Calcaterra
24th	2010	Gibraltar	(Japan) Shinji Nakadai	(Sweden) Jonas Buud	(United States) Michael Wardian
25th	2011	(Netherlands) Winschoten	(Italy) Giorgio Calcaterra	(United States) Michael Wardian	(United States) Andrew Henshaw
26th	2012	(Italy) Seregno	(Italy) Giorgio Calcaterra	(Sweden) Jonas Buud	(Italy) Alberico Di Cecco
	2013	cancelled			
27th	2014	(Qatar) Doha	(United States) Max King	(Sweden) Jonas Buud	(Spain) José Antonio Requejo
28th	2015	(Netherlands) Winschoten	(Sweden) Jonas Buud	(Spain) Asier Cuevas	(Italy) Giorgio Calcaterra
29th	2016	(Spain) Los Alcázares	(Japan) Hideaki Yamauchi	(South Africa) Bongmusa Mthembu	(United States) Patrick Reagan
	2017	cancelled			
30th	2018	(Croatia) Sveti Martin na Muri	(Japan) Hideaki Yamauchi	(Japan) Takehiko Gyoba	(South Africa) Bongmusa Mthembu
	2019–2021	cancelled			
31st	2022	(Germany) Bernau bei Berlin	(Japan) Haruki Okayama	(Japan) Jumpei Yamaguchi	(Netherlands) Piet Wiersma
32nd	2024	(India) Bengaluru	(Japan) Jumpei Yamaguchi	(Spain) Antonio Jesús Aguilar	(Japan) Haruki Okayama

=== Women ===
#	Year	Location	Gold	Silver	Bronze
1st	1987	(Belgium) Torhout	(Switzerland) Agnes Eberle	(France) Monique Exbrayat	Marie-France Plas
2nd	1988	(Spain) Santander	(United States) Ann Trason	(Hungary) Márta Vass	(United Kingdom) Eleanor Adams
3rd	1989	(France) Rambouillet	(West Germany) Katherina Janicke	(West Germany) Sigrid Lomsky	(United Kingdom) Hilary Walker
4th	1990	(United States) Duluth	(United Kingdom) Eleanor Adams	(United States) Ann Trason	(Hungary) Márta Vass
5th	1991	(Italy) Faenza	(United Kingdom) Eleanor Adams	(Slovakia) Nadezhda Gumerova	(Hungary) Márta Vass
6th	1992	(Spain) Palamós	(Russia) Nurzia Bagmanova	(Hungary) Márta Vass	(United Kingdom) Carolyn Hunter-Rowe
7th	1993	(Belgium) Torhout	(United Kingdom) Carolyn Hunter-Rowe	(Russia) Valentina Shatyeyeva	(Russia) Valentina Lyakhova
8th	1994	(Japan) Saroma	(Russia) Valentina Shatyeyeva	(United Kingdom) Trudi Thomson	(Russia) Irina Petrova
9th	1995	(Netherlands) Winschoten	(United States) Ann Trason	(South Africa) Helene Joubert	(Germany) Maria Bak
10th	1996	(Russia) Moscow	(Russia) Valentina Shatyeyeva	(Australia) Linda Meadows	(Russia) Yelena Sidorenkova
11th	1997	(Netherlands) Winschoten	(Russia) Valentina Lyakhova	(France) Isabelle Olive	(Poland) Andrzej Magier
12th	1998	(Japan) Shimanto	(United Kingdom) Carolyn Hunter-Rowe	(New Zealand) Lilac Flay	(Brazil) Maria Venâncio
13th	1999	(France) Chavagnes-en-Paillers	(Slovakia) Anna Balosáková	(France) Martine Cubizolles	(Russia) Oksana Ladyshina
14th	2000	(Netherlands) Winschoten	(Hungary) Edit Bérces	(Russia) Yelvira Kolpakova	(Germany) Constanze Wagner
15th	2001	(France) Cléder	(Russia) Yelvira Kolpakova	(Russia) Marina Bychkova	(Italy) Monica Casiraghi
16th	2002	(Belgium) Torhout	(Russia) Tatyana Zhyrkova	(Japan) Akiko Sekiya	(Italy) Monica Casiraghi
17th	2003	(Taiwan) Tainan	(Italy) Monica Casiraghi	(Italy) Paola Sanna	(Germany) Elke Hiebl
18th	2004	(Netherlands) Winschoten	(Russia) Tatyana Zhyrkova	(Russia) Marina Bichkova	(Italy) Monica Casiraghi
19th	2005	(Japan) Saroma	(Japan) Hiroko Sho	(United States) Anne Riddle-Lundblad	(Japan) Yoko Yamazawa
20th	2006	(South Korea) Misari	(United Kingdom) Elizabeth Hawker	(Italy) Monica Carlin	(Japan) Hiroko Sho
21st	2007	(Netherlands) Winschoten	(Japan) Norimi Sakurai	(France) Laurence Fricotteau	(Japan) Hiroko Sho
22nd	2008	(Italy) Rome	(Russia) Tatyana Zhirkova	(United States) Kami Semick	(Italy) Monica Carlin
23rd	2009	(Belgium) Torhout	(United States) Kami Semick	(Russia) Irina Vishnevskaya	(Italy) Monica Caelin
24th	2010	Gibraltar	(United Kingdom) Ellie Greenwood	(Italy) Monica Carlin	(United Kingdom) Lizzy Hawker
25th	2011	(Netherlands) Winschoten	(Russia) Marina Bychkova	(United Kingdom) Joasia Zakrzewski	(South Africa) Lindsay van Aswegen
26th	2012	(Italy) Seregno	(United States) Amy Sproston	(Sweden) Kajsa Berg	(Russia) Irina Vishnevskaya
	2013	cancelled			
27th	2014	(Qatar) Doha	(United Kingdom) Ellie Greenwood	(Japan) Chiyuki Mochizuki	(United Kingdom) Joasia Zakrzewski
28th	2015	(Netherlands) Winschoten	(United States) Camille Herron	(Sweden) Kajsa Berg	(Croatia) Marija Vrajić
29th	2016	(Spain) Los Alcázares	(Australia) Kirstin Bull	(Croatia) Nikolina Sustic	(United Kingdom) Joasia Zakrzewski
	2017	cancelled			
30th	2018	(Croatia) Sveti Martin na Muri	(Croatia) Nikolina Šustić	(Germany) Nele Alder-Baerens	(Japan) Mai Fujisawa
	2019–2021	cancelled			
31st	2022	(Germany) Bernau bei Berlin	(France) Floriane Hot	(France) Camille Chaigneau	(Republic of Ireland) Caitriona Jennings
32nd	2024	(India) Bengaluru	(France) Floriane Hot	(France) Marie-Ange Brumelot	(United Kingdom) Sarah Webster

== Total medals tables ==
=== Men ===
Rank	Nation	Gold	Silver	Bronze	Total
1	Japan	7	2	3	12
2	Russia	6	7	6	19
3	Italy	6	0	3	9
4	France	4	3	4	11
5	Spain	2	4	3	9
6	Brazil	2	0	0	2
7	Sweden	1	4	0	5
8	United States	1	2	3	6
9	Great Britain	1	1	1	3
10	Ukraine	1	0	0	1
11	Poland	0	4	1	5
12	South Africa	0	1	1	2
13	Belgium	0	1	0	1
13	Netherlands	0	1	0	1
13	New Zealand	0	1	0	1
16	Germany	0	0	3	3
17	Canada	0	0	1	1
Totals (17 entries)		31	31	29	91

=== Women ===
Rank	Nation	Gold	Silver	Bronze	Total
1	Russia	9	5	5	19
2	Great Britain	7	2	6	15
3	United States	5	3	1	9
4	Japan	2	2	4	8
5	France	1	5	1	7
6	Italy	1	3	5	9
7	Germany	1	2	3	6
8	Hungary	1	2	2	5
9	Croatia	1	1	1	3
10	Slovakia	1	1	0	2
11	Switzerland	1	0	0	1
12	Sweden	0	2	0	2
13	South Africa	0	1	1	2
14	Australia	0	1	0	1
14	New Zealand	0	1	0	1
16	Brazil	0	0	1	1
16	Poland	0	0	1	1
Totals (17 entries)		30	31	31	92

== See also ==
- Ultramarathon
- International Association of Ultrarunners
- IAU 50 km World Championships
