= St. Thomas Aquinas High School (Ohio) =

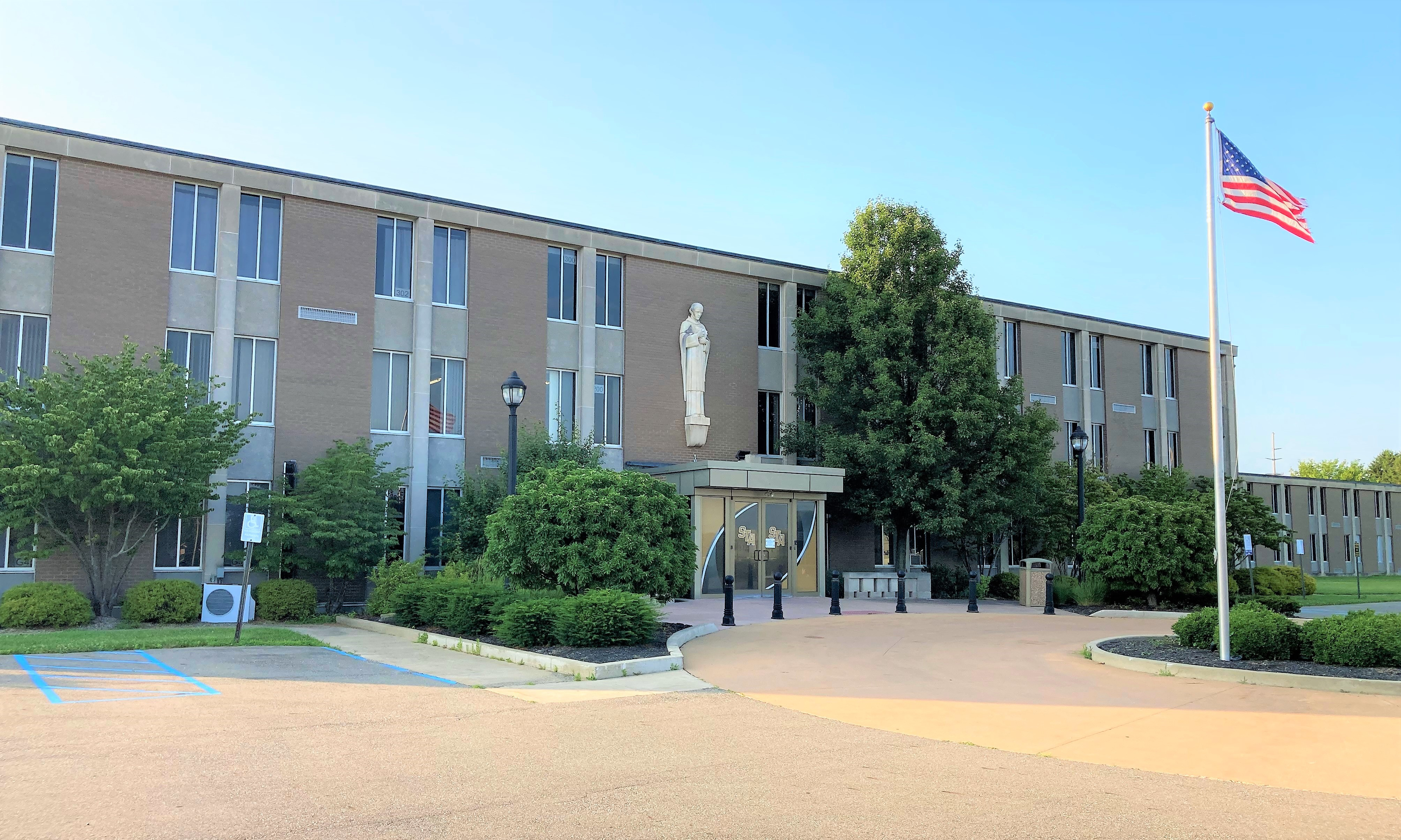
- Front of school

Location
- 2121 Reno Drive N.E. Louisville, Ohio 44641-9036; United States; 40°51′8″N 81°16′47″W

Information
- Type: Parochial, coeducational
- Motto: "Veritas, Scholastica, Excellentia" ("Truth, Scholarship, Excellence")
- Religious affiliation: Roman Catholic
- Established: 1964
- Oversight: Roman Catholic Diocese of Youngstown
- President: Joseph French
- Principal: Kevin Irvine
- Grades: 6–12
- Colors: Black and gold
- Team name: Knights
- Rival: Central Catholic High School
- Newspaper: The Lance
- Yearbook: "The Templar"
- Website: www.starkcountycatholicschools.org/stthomasaquinashighschool_home.aspx

St. Thomas Aquinas High School (STA) is a private coeducational high school located in Louisville, Ohio, United States, affiliated with the Roman Catholic Diocese of Youngstown. It was founded in 1964 to serve the Catholic families of eastern Stark County and parts of Portage County. When it opened, Aquinas enrolled both male and female students, but was a single-sex educational institution, as boys and girls attended classes within separate wings of the school. STA began practicing its current co-educational format in 1970.

== Academics ==
In 2004, Aquinas adopted a new model of governance and administration for the school.

As of the 2009–2010 school year: the president of the school is Thomas Dyer, who served as a teacher and administrator from 1972–1984 and the principal is Joseph C. Vagedes, previously a long-time Chemistry teacher and administrator at the school.

As of the 2016-2017 school year: Father Thomas Dyer retired and is serving as the president emeritus, the principal is Frederick Schlueter, previously the assistant principal at Alliance High School, and the assistant principal is Laura Parise.

There is also a Board of Directors that oversee all operations of the school, including finances, enrollment, fundraising, mission, development, etc., and is made up of various individuals with Aquinas connections including alumni, parents of former Aquinas students, and parents of current Aquinas students.

A middle school for grades six to eight opened at the high school campus for the 2014-2015 school year.

== State championships ==
- Football – 1984
- Boys' Cross Country - 1976, 1980, 1981, 2006, 2007
- Girls' Cross Country - 2015
- Boys' Track and Field - 2016
- Girls' Track and Field - 2015, 2016
- Girls' Tennis - 1996

=== State Runners-Up ===
- Football – 1974, 1985
- Boys' Basketball - 2014
- Boys' Cross Country - 2008, 2009, 2015, 2016
- Girls' Cross Country - 2016
- Boys' Track and Field - 2010
- Girls' Track and Field - 2014
- Girls' Volleyball - 2017

== Athletics ==
Included in STA's trophy case are five state boys cross country championships (including three in the late 1970s and early 1980s, and two in 2006 and 2007), numerous regional appearances for boys and girls basketball, a state team title in girls tennis, as well as many individual state qualifiers in girls tennis, and many state track and field qualifiers. Other sports, such as soccer (boys and girls), baseball, softball, and swimming have also seen regional and state qualifiers over the years. STA swimming produced many state qualifiers from the late 1980s through the 1990s. In 1990, the STA boys swim team finished 6th overall in the state, which is one of the highest finishes for a Stark County swim team since 1990. In 2007, the boys soccer won its second district title in a row and were regional runner-ups.

Between 1973 and 1989, the football team played in three state championship games (once in the old Class AA in 1974, and twice in Division IV in 1984 and 1985). In 1984, STA won the Ohio State Championship in football in Division IV with a 23-0 win over Columbus Bishop Hartley Hawks. Over a 2-year stretch, the 1984-1985 seasons, STA football compiled a total record of 25-1-1 with 2 state title game appearances and numerous all-Ohio selections. STA appeared in the state playoffs six times during the 1970s and 1980s.

Boys golf made three state appearances in 2011, 2012, and 2013. In 2013 they were also sectional and district winners

STA joined the North Coast League (NCL) beginning in the 2013-14 school year for all sports except football. The football program joined the NCL for the 2014-15 school year.

The St. Thomas Aquinas Knights were featured in the 2013 film Underdogs.

== Notable alumni ==
- James S. Gwin - Federal Judge - U.S. District Court for the Northern District of Ohio
- John Mahon - drummer and band member for Elton John's backing band
- Tony Migliozzi, ultra-marathoner and 2015 IAU 50 km World Champion
