= Floriane Hot =

French long-distance runner

- Born: 27 April 1991 (age 35); Toulouse, France
- Education: École nationale de l'aviation civile
- Occupation: French long-distance runner

Floriane Hot (born April 27, 1991, in Toulouse) is a French long-distance and ultra-distance runner. She is the 2022 and 2024 100 kilometer world champion.

== Biography ==
Born in Toulouse, Floriane Hot grew up playing football there. She began training as an air traffic controller at the École nationale de l'aviation civile then moved to Aix-en-Provence to work at the Aix-en-Provence Aerodrome. She abandoned football and took up running where she showed good results. She won, among other things, the Salon-de-Provence half marathon in 2019.

In 2022, she takes up the challenge launched by her companion Nicolas Navarro to run a 100 kilometer race. After having followed specific training in Kenya, she presented herself at the start of the French championships in the specialty in Belvès. She dominated the race and won in 7:42:24, almost forty minutes ahead of her closest pursuer Stéphanie Gicquel. On August 27, she took part in the 100 kilometer world championships in Bernau bei Berlin. She had a complicated start but ended up catching up with several of her opponents. She managed to increase the pace in the second part of the race and found herself at the head of the race alongside her compatriot Camille Chaigneau who was leading alone. She ended up making the difference and won in 7 h 4 min 3 s to win the world title. She also set a new European women's record over the distance. With her teammates Camille Chaigneau and Stéphanie Gicquel, she also won the silver medal in the team rankings.
