= Bán =

Bán can refer to:

- Ban (title), title used in many regions of Europe
- Bánovce nad Bebravou (Hungarian: Bán), village in the Trenčín Region, Slovakia
- Bán (surname)

== See also ==
- Ban (disambiguation)
