= Tony Migliozzi =

American marathoner

Tony Migliozzi (born 1989) from North Canton, Ohio is an American marathoner and ultra-marathoner.

== High school career ==
He won two OHSAA cross country state titles at St. Thomas Aquinas High School.

== College career ==
At Malone University he was an NAIA runner-up in the marathon.

== Professional career ==
Migliozzi won the 2015 IAU 50 km World Championships.

He holds the second fastest time ever in the indoor marathon.

Migliozzi qualified for the 2016 U.S. Olympic Trials in the marathon.

In 2016, he was named USATF Ultra Runner of the Year.
