= Kami Semick =

American runner

Kami Semick is an American ultramarathon runner based in Bend, Oregon who was a two-time UltraRunner of the Year and USATF’s Ultra Runner of the Year in 2009 and 2010. She ran collegiately with the University of Alabama and transitioned to ultramarathons in her 30s and came in second with a time of 4:54 in the Siskyou Out Back 50k, second in 4:54. Her ultra career went on to include five wins at the Miwok 100K Trail Race, a fourth place finish at the 2006 Western States 100, first female and third overall at the 2010 Vermont 100. Internationally, she won the 2009 IAU 100K World Cup in Belgium, the IAU 50K World Championship in Gibraltar and was involved with the creation of the North Face Tea Horse Trail Running Expedition.

On the road, she won the 2008 Portland Marathon in 2:45:54 and placed fourth in the 2010 Comrades Marathon.
