= Joasia Zakrzewski =

Scottish ultrarunner (born 1976)

Medal record

Women's Ultramarathon

Representing United Kingdom

IAU 100 km World Championships
Gold medal – first place	2014 Doha	Team
Bronze medal – third place	2014 Doha	100 km
Bronze medal – third place	2016 Los Alcázares	100 km

IAU 50 km World Championships
Silver medal – second place	2014 Doha	50 km
Bronze medal – third place	2011 Assen	50 km

IAU 100 km European Championships
Silver medal – second place	2011 Winschoten	100 km
Bronze medal – third place	2015 Winschoten	100 km

Joanna Lynn Zakrzewski (known as Joasia or Jo, born 1976) is an ultrarunner from Dumfries, Scotland.

== Running career ==
Zakrzewski is a medical doctor, and had been a race doctor and expedition medical officer before taking up ultrarunning. She has been diagnosed with relative energy deficiency in sport (RED-S).

In 2016, she was the first woman to win the 53.5-mile (86.1 km) Race to the King along the South Downs Way.

In a race in Sydney in July 2020, she set three Scottish records: distance run in 12 hours and 24 hours, and time for 100 miles, and broke the British record for 200km.

In February 2023, Zakrzewski set a world record of 255.7 miles (411.5 km) for a distance run in 48 hours, although this was beaten the following month when Camille Herron ran 435.336 kilometres (270.505 mi) in the time.

=== Cheating incident ===
Zakrzewski was stripped of her third position in the GB Ultras race in 2023 when it emerged that she took a car ride for a part of the race. She categorized herself as an "idiot" for accepting the award and blamed it on miscommunication as she claimed that she originally intended to withdraw from the race and hence took a car ride. However, the race director, Wayne Drinkwater, rejected these claims noting that "After the event, there was no attempt by Joasia to make us aware of what had happened and to give us an opportunity to correct the results or return the third place trophy during the course of the subsequent seven days."

Zakrzewski received a one-year ban for the incident in November 2023.

== Personal life ==
Zakrzewski qualified in medicine at the University of Cambridge ( MB BChir 1999). She works as a general practitioner in Woy Woy, New South Wales, Australia.
