= Isabelle Olive =

French athlete (born 1960)

Personal information
- Born: 19 May 1960 (age 66)
- Years active: 1990s

Sport
- Event: ultramarathon

Isabelle Olive is a French athlete, born 19 May 1960, who ran for the club de Earp Romans and then for CS Bourgoin-Jallieu, who specialized in Ultramarathons. Her French successor was Martine Cubizolles on the international ultramarathon scene. She had the second best French performance over 100 km in 1997, with 7:40:09 hours.

== International competitions ==
- IAU 100 km World Championships runner-up in 1994 and 1997 (3rd in 1993)
- World champion 100 km road team in 1997 and 1999 (2nd in 1994 and 1998)
- IAU 100 km European Championships winner 1995
- European champion 100 km road team in 1995, 1996 (2nd 1994)
- 100 km Vendée in 1995
- Marathon Drome in 2004
- Winner of the international trail gendarmes et les voleurs du temps in 2003
- 4th (2nd European woman) in Solukhumbu trail 2011
- Today Isabelle Olive is a professor at the school Louis Pasteur in Bourg de Peage
