= Aurél Bernáth =

Hungarian painter and art theorist

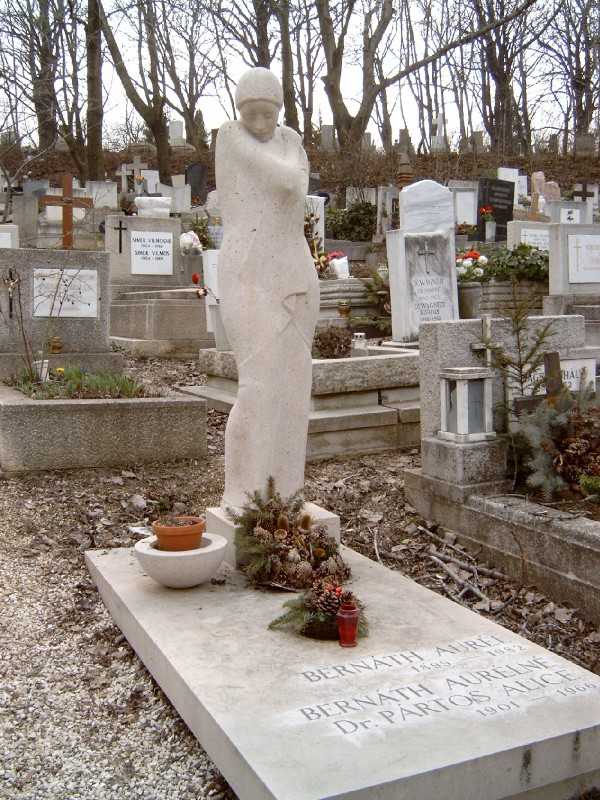
- Born: Aurél Bernáth; 13 November 1895; Marcali
- Died: 13 March 1982 (aged 86); Budapest
- Movement: Expressionism

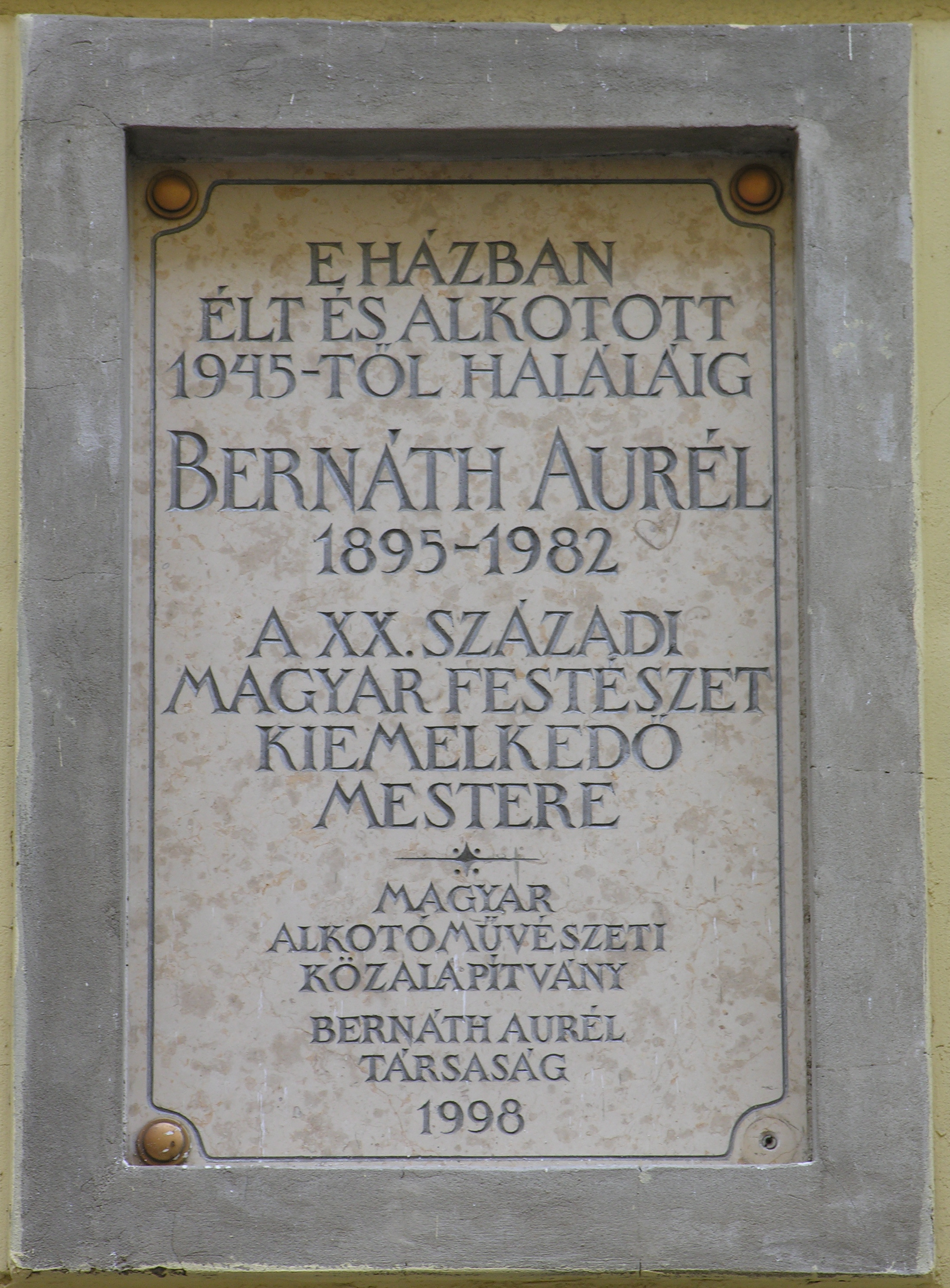
Commemorative plaque of Aurél Bernáth in Budapest

Aurél Bernáth (1895–1982) was a Hungarian painter and art theorist. He studied at Nagybánya with István Réti and János Thorma. Bernath fought as a soldier in the First World War and moved to Vienna in 1921. Bernath's painting style was heavily influenced by the onslaught of German Expressionism. He was invited to Berlin by Herwarth Walden where his work was exhibited at the now-defunct Sturm Gallery between 1922 and 1924. Two years later, he returned to Hungary and joined the KUT (Képzőművészek Új Társasága, New Society of Artists), becoming one of the leading figures of the Gresham Circle of artists during the 1930s. He taught at the Hungarian Academy of Fine Arts from 1945 to 1974. From 1948 to 1949, he worked as an editor for the journal Hungarian Art. After 1947, many of Bernath's writings on art theory were published and became very popular.

== List of works ==
- View of the Szent István Park, (oil on canvas 115 × 80 cm)
- View from the window, (Watercolour on paper 41 × 26.5 cm)
- By the lake Balaton, (pastel on paper 85 × 65 cm)
- Rest at noon, (pastel on paper 90 × 70 cm)
- Midsummer night's dream, (pastel on cardboard 134 × 108 cm)
- Girl playing on the flut, (Watercolour on paper 39 × 40.3 cm)
- Ferenc Szegő's childhood-portrait, (charcoal on paper 86 × 59 cm)
- Lady with an unicorn, (mixed media on paper 93 × 80 cm)
- Midsummer night's dream, Fresco draft of theatre Erkel, (oil on canvas 134 × 108 cm)
- 1931 Violinist, (oil on canvas 81 × 112 cm)
- 1927 Morning, (oil on canvas 146 × 126 cm)
- 1927 Riviera, (oil on canvas 150 × 130 cm)
- Nude on the shore, (oil on canvas 81 × 111 cm)
- Table still-life, (pastel on paper 74.5 × 59 cm)
- 1930 Evening park with lovers, (oil on canvas 70.5 × 101 cm)
- Afternoon walk, (mixed media on paper 39.5 × 28.5 cm)
- Boats at Révfülöp, (Watercolour on paper 24 × 33 cm)
- Boats, (watercolor on paper 31.5 × 23 cm)
- Shadowy pines, (watercolor on paper 50 × 34 cm)
- Still-life with apples, (oil on canvas 80 × 45 cm)
- 1936 Portrait of Elvira, (oil on canvas 80 × 110 cm)
- Studio Still Life with the Evening Danube - Side in the Background, (oil on canvas 80 × 54 cm)
- Bank of the River Danube, (pastel on paper 69 × 50 cm)
- Atelier, (oil on canvas 70.5 × 60.5 cm)
- 1937 Self-Portrait by the Window, (watercolor on paper 35 × 45 cm)
- History, (tempera on wood 200 × 90 cm)
- Reminiscence from the Lake Balaton, (watercolor on paper 35 × 44 cm)
- 1926 Bridge by Pöstyén, (oil on canvas 74 × 58 cm)
- Still Life of Cyclament, (pastel on paper 83 × 43 cm)
- The Banks of the River Danube, (watercolor on paper 48 × 33 cm)
- 1936 Watching the Stars (Stars, Night I.), (pastel on paper 93 × 73 cm)
- Dinner, (oil on canvas 120 × 85 cm)
- Woman with Flowers, (oil on canvas 46 × 70 cm)
- 1968 Building. Design for the Lower Part of the Fresco Workers' State, (mixed media on paper 98 × 69 cm)
- 1968 Reunion. Design for the UpperPart of the Fresco Workers' State, (mixed media on paper 96 × 66 cm)
- Studio Window, (mixed media on paper 52 × 38 cm)
- Landscape by the Water, (watercolor on paper 50 × 35 cm)
- Man and Woman, (pastel on paper 72 × 113 cm)
- Heavenly and Earthly Love, (pastel on paper 54 × 78 cm)
- Lake Balaton, (watercolor on paper 47 × 34 cm)
- Marili Before Blue Background (Birthday), (pastel on paper 60 × 73 cm)
- 1922 Peasants, (Stencil Indian ink, gouache, gold paint on paper 37 × 27 cm)
- Table Still - Life with a Bunch of Flowers, (pastel on paper 74 × 57 cm)
- Summer on the Ábrahámhegy, (pastel on paper 97 × 67 cm)
- Thinking, (pastel on paper 47 × 68 cm)
- 1933 Boy playing, (oil on canvas 80 × 110.5 cm)
- 1932 Venus, (oil on canvas 80 × 110 cm)
- 1922 Counts and Castles, (mixed media on paper 38 × 28 cm)
- The Kovács Family, (oil on canvas 130 × 104 cm)
- Norwegian Waters, (watercolor on paper 23 × 25 cm)
- 1922 "Crossroads. ""Graphik""-portfolio, 1922", (Pochoir, Indian ink, gouache, golden paint on paper 28 × 38 cm)
- 1931 Mooring with Gulls, (oil on canvas 100 × 70 cm)
- Lake in the mountains, (watercolor on paper 33 × 23 cm)
- Still life of Flowers, (pastel on paper 50 × 70 cm)
- Park, (watercolor on paper 48 × 34 cm)
- Bay, (watercolor on paper 48 × 36 cm)
- On the balcony, (mixed media on paper 42 × 34 cm)
- Landscape, (watercolour on cardboard 44 × 27 cm)
- 1915 Lady in a white blouse, (oil on canvas 50 × 55 cm)
- Villages. Graphik-portfolio, 1920–1922, (hand coloured pochoir, Indian ink, gouache, golden paint on paper 38 × 28 cm)
- In the Studio Window, (oil on canvas 61 × 48 cm)
- 1943 Fisherman, (pastel on paper 100 × 73 cm)
- Portrait of Csilla, (pastel on paper 50 × 65 cm)
- 1935 Winter afternoon, (oil on canvas 110 × 80 cm)
- 1935 Lady in brown cloth, (pastel on paper 35 × 85 cm)
- Landscape, (pastel on velourspaper 60.5 × 50 cm)
- 1931 At the sea, (pastel on paper 70 × 99 cm)
- Flowers, On the reverse: Cat, (watercolor on paper 37 × 54 cm)
- 1941 The bridge at Szolnok, (pastel on paper 100 × 73.5 cm)
- Boats, (watercolor on paper 41 × 29 cm)
- View from the window, (Watercolour on paper 41 × 26 cm)
- Forest, (tempera on paper 47 × 34 cm)
- In the park, (mixed media on paper 34 × 42 cm)
- Dreamer, (mixed media on paper 44 × 37 cm)
- 1936 Brissago (Lago Maggiore), (pastel on paper 101 × 73 cm)
- The Danube Bank with the Chain Bridge and the Buda Castle, (Oil, golden smoke application on metalboard 78 × 81 cm)
- Man Dressing, (mixed media on paper 73 × 156 cm)
- Standing Woman, (mixed media on paper 58 × 150 cm)
- Glorious garden, around 1970, (watercolor on paper 50.5 × 35 cm)
- Garden with chair in Göd, around 1970, (watercolor on paper 49.5 × 35 cm)
- 1915 Landscape in Nagybánya, (oil, canvas on cardboard 61 × 39 cm)
- In the Field, (Oil on board 51 × 30 cm)
- Palette with Brushes, (oil on canvas 70 × 60 cm)
- Futballer Boy, (oil on canvas, laid down on board 27 × 41 cm)
- Midsummer Night's dream, 1972–1973, (pastel on paper laid down on canvas 134 × 108 cm)
- Bathers around a boat on the beach at Ábrahám Hill, (watercolor on paper 54 × 40 cm)
- 1935 Villas (Row of villas), (pastel on cardboard 100 × 70 cm)
- 1947 Man with bow-tie, (pastel on cardboard 54 × 44 cm)
- 1947 Man in interior, (pastel on cardboard 62.5 × 62 cm)
- 1942 Lady painter, (oil on canvas 130 × 86 cm)
- 1940 Badacsony, (oil on canvas 110 × 80 cm)
- The shore of Lake Balaton in the spring, (watercolor on paper 45 × 30.5 cm)
- Fishing boats on the Danube, (watercolor on paper 37 × 27 cm)
- 1947 Fish (Still life with fish, Fish and plate, Fish still life, Fish with plate), (pastel on paper 53 × 46 cm)
- 1946 Self-portrait, (oil on canvas 55.5 × 68 cm)
- 1932 Teacher, (pastel on paper 48.5 × 64.5 cm)
- 1928 The bridge at Trencsén, (pastel on paper on cardboard 102 × 73 cm)
- 1929 Beckov Castle, (pastel on paper 67.5 × 46 cm)
- Night with moths I., (pastel on paper 72.5 × 92.5 cm)
- Graphics-folder, (Ink, charcoal, gold paint, paper 34 × 42.5 cm)
- Garden in Alsógöd, (watercolor on paper 35 × 49 cm)
- Maid on the Puszta (Herdgirl, Peasant girl), (oil on canvas 74 × 100 cm)
- 1933 Playing Boy, (oil on canvas 80 × 110 cm)
- Garden in Göd, (watercolor on paper 35 × 50 cm)
- 1935 Sunset in the Park, (pastel on paper 50 × 58 cm)
- 1968 View of Budapest, (oil on canvas 100.5 × 73 cm)
- Illustration for Peer Gynt, (Watercolour on paper 24.5 × 32.5 cm)
- Danube-bank, (watercolor on paper 35 × 50 cm)
- 1953 The Danube-bank from a window of Szent István park, (oil on canvas 115 × 80 cm)
- Christmas-tree, (Aquarelle, paper covered canvas 26.5 × 36 cm)
- Woodland scene, (works on paper 45.72 × 30.48 cm)
- Boats moored in an estuary, (works on paper 38.1 × 27.94 cm)
- Reminiscence from the Lake Balaton, (works on paper 35.56 × 43.18 cm)
- 1926 Bridge by Postyen, (Paintings 73.66 × 58.42 cm)
- Still life of cyclamen, (works on paper 83.82 × 43.18 cm)
- Banks of the River Danube, (works on paper 48.26 × 33.02 cm)
- Fish on a chopping board with a knife, (works on paper 53.34 × 45.72 cm)
- Lake Balaton, (works on paper 48.26 × 33.02 cm)
- Studio still life with the evening Danube, (Paintings 78.74 × 53.34 cm)
- Atelier, (Paintings 71.12 × 60.96 cm)
- 1931 At the Sea (Portrait from Sassnitz, Pöstyén), (pastel on paper 72 × 99 cm)
- 1917 Rural scene, (Paintings 48.26 × 38.1 cm)
- Story design, (Paintings 200.66 × 88.9 cm)
- Standing woman, (mixed media on paper 58 × 150 cm)
- Man dressing, (mixed media on paper 73 × 156 cm)
- The Danube Bank with the Chain Bridge and the Buda Castle, (oil, golden smoke application in metalboard 78 × 81 cm)
- 1936 Brissago (Lago Maggiore), (pastel on paper 101 × 73 cm)
- Portrait of Csilla, (pastel on paper 50 × 65 cm)
- 1943 Fisherman, (pastel on paper 100 × 73 cm)
- In the studio window, (oil on canvas 61 × 48.5 cm)
- Villages, Graphik, (hand coloured pochoir, Indian ink, gouache, golden 38 × 28 cm)
- Still-life, (pastel on paper 66 × 46 cm)
- Balaton, (watercolor on paper 50 × 35 cm)
- 1936 Brissago (Lago Maggiore), (pastel on paper 101.5 × 73 cm)
- 1942 Atelier-detail, (Pastel on paper, mounted on cardboard 101.5 × 75 cm)
- 1947 Alice and Marili on the Balcony, (oil on canvas)
- 1922 "Graphik"-folder: 1. Falling and Crying, (Mixed technique)
- 1922 "Graphik"-folder: 2. Villages, (Mixed technique)
- 1922 "Graphik"-folder: 3. Cathedrals and Houses, (Mixed technique)
- 1922 "Graphik"-folder: 4. Counts and Castles, (Mixed technique)
- 1922 "Graphik"-folder: 5. Peasants, (Mixed technique)
- 1922 "Graphik"-folder: 6. Crossroad, (Mixed technique)
- 1924 Lake Starnberg No. 1, (charcoal)
- Lakeshore with Bathinghouse, (Pastel)
- 1927 Morning No. 1, (oil on canvas)
- 1930 On the Terrace, (oil on canvas)
- Peasant family, (engraving 352 × 289 cm)
- 1942 Pike on a Tray, (oil on canvas)
- 1955 Portrait of Lőrinc Szabó, (Pastel)
- 1926 Riviera, (oil on canvas)
- Road at the Lakeside, (Pastel)
- Self-Portrait, (oil on canvas)
- 1930 Self-Portrait in a Yellow Coat, (oil on canvas)
- 1975 Self-Portrait with my Daughter, (oil on canvas)
- 1925 The Charles Bridge in Prague, (Pastel)
- 1926 The Port of Genoa, (oil on canvas)
- 1953 Turreted House at Lake Balaton, (oil on canvas)
- 1932 Venus, (oil on canvas)
- 1931 Violinist, (oil on canvas)
- 1928 Walchensee No. 2, (oil on canvas)
- Self portrait by the window, (works on paper 35.56 × 45.72 cm)
- 1942 Female artist in her studio, (oil on canvas 129.54 × 86.36 cm)
- Flower girl, (oil on canvas 45.72 × 71.12 cm)
- History, (tempera on board 200.66 × 88.9 cm)
- Figures in shallow water by a small boat, (works on paper 53.34 × 40.64 cm)
- 1935 Village with man on horseback in the foreground, (works on paper 99.06 × 71.12 cm)
- 1947 Portrait of a gentleman, (works on paper 53.34 × 43.18 cm)
- 1947 Portrait of a gentleman in an interior, (works on paper 60.96 × 60.96 cm)
- Badacsony, (oil on canvas 109.22 × 78.74 cm)
- Woman dressed in traditional costume, (oil on canvas 71.12 × 109.22 cm)
- 1942 Bridge with figures, (works on paper 40.64 × 27.94 cm)
- 1920 Album, (works on paper 33.02 × 43.18 cm)
- Abstract trees, (works on paper 35.56 × 48.26 cm)
- Portrait of a maiden, (oil on canvas 73.66 × 99.06 cm)
- Summer at Abrahamhegy, (pastel 96.52 × 66.04 cm)
- Thinking, (pastel 48.26 × 68.58 cm)
- Evening park with lovers, 1930, (oil on canvas 71.12 × 101.6 cm)
- Tumble and scream, (works on paper 33.02 × 27.94 cm)
- Venice, 1962, (watercolor 50.8 × 38.1 cm)
- Marili before blue background, birthday, (pastel 60.96 × 73.66 cm)
- Peasants, (works on paper 38.1 × 27.94 cm)
- Table still life with bunch of flowers, (pastel 73.66 × 55.88 cm)
- 1932 Fishermen, (mixed media 43.18 × 33.02 cm)
- View of Budapest, (oil on canvas 99.06 × 73.66 cm)
- Watching the stars, (works on paper 93.98 × 73.66 cm)
- Dinner, (oil on canvas 119.38 × 83.82 cm)
- Woman with flowers, (oil on canvas 45.72 × 71.12 cm)
- Design for lower part of fresco, Worker's State, (works on paper 99.06 × 68.58 cm)
- 1968 Design for the upperpart of the fresco, Workers State, (works on paper 96.52 × 66.04 cm)
- Ice skating in Buda, (works on paper 93.98 × 73.66 cm)
- Kalapas lany (Girl with the hat), (oil on canvas 73.7 × 99.1 cm)
- Still-Life in the Window, (oil on canvas 61 × 50.5 cm)

== External sources ==
- Hungary Painting - Kieselbach
- Works of Aurél Bernáth on Fine arts in Hungary

Media related to Aurél Bernáth at Wikimedia Commons
