= Portland Marathon =

Non-profit organization in the USA

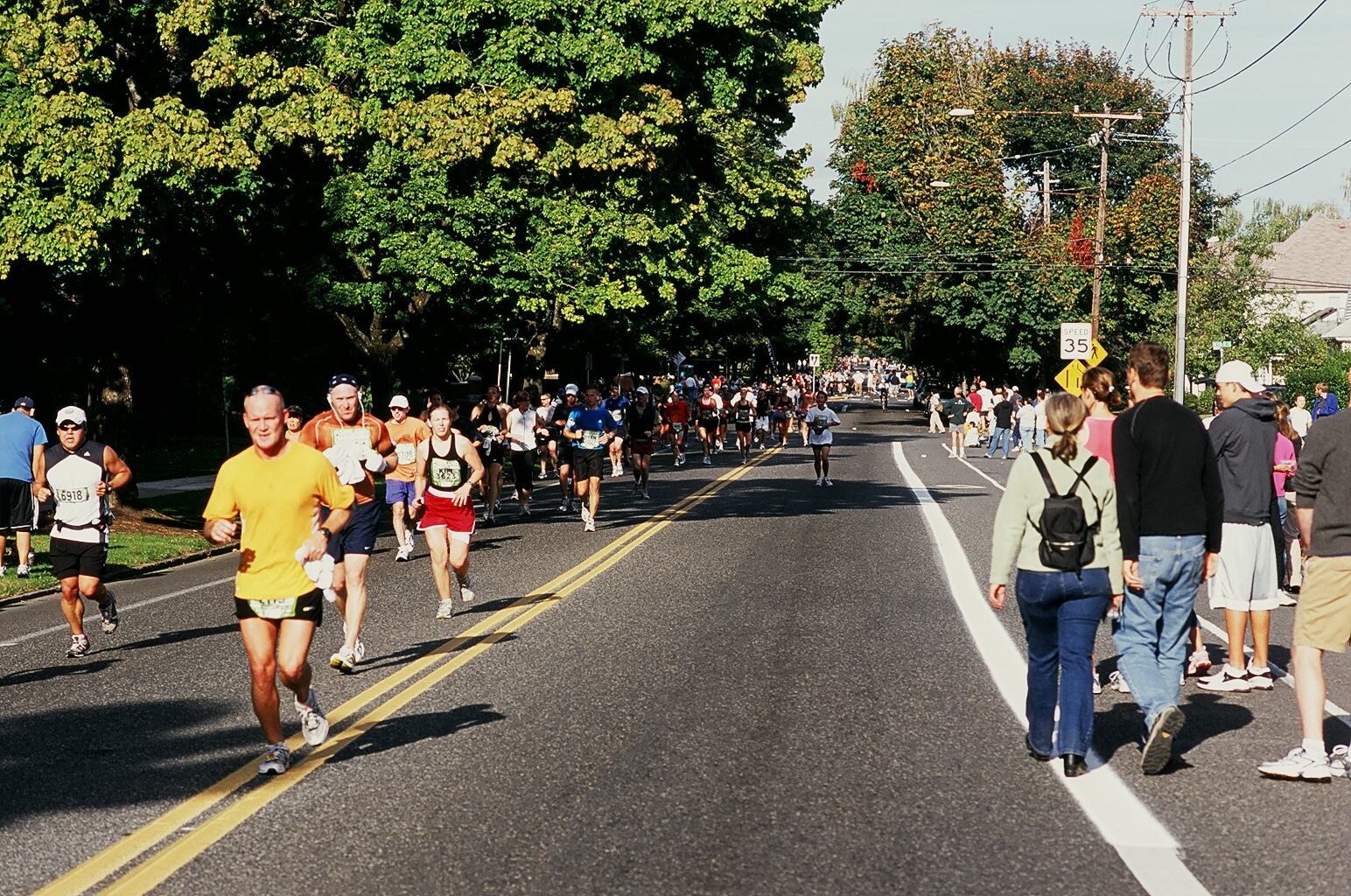
- The 2006 Portland Marathon
- Date: October
- Location: Portland, Oregon, United States
- Event type: Road
- Distance: Marathon and half-marathon
- Established: 1972
- Website: www.portlandmarathon.com

The Portland Marathon Presented by OHSU Health is an annual sporting event which takes place on the first Sunday of October in Portland, Oregon, first held in 1972. The race consists of a full marathon and a half marathon. The race starts and ends at the Tom McCall Waterfront Park at Salmon Street and Naito Parkway, and includes several bridge crossings and multiple iconic landmarks in Portland. The field has reached over 15,000 runners.

== History ==
The race has been held annually since 1972 and is one of the longest-running consecutive marathons in the United States. The inaugural race was held on Sauvie Island and attracted 86 participants.

The race route underwent various alterations in the 1970s and 1980s before solidifying on a course that traveled clockwise from downtown Portland to the St. Johns Bridge via Highway 30, and then down the bluff on Willamette Blvd before finishing back in the downtown area.

In 1991, Japan's Hiromi Yokoyama set the women's course record with her time of 2:36:40 hours.

In 1997, the men's course record of 2:17:21 hours was set by German runner Uli Steidl. The oldest finisher was Mavis Lingren at age 90 in 1997.

Following a misconduct investigation in 2018 by the Oregon Department of Justice related to long-time race management personnel, the City of Portland issued a Request for Proposals to solicit a new race production firm to take over management of the event. In January 2019 the City selected Brooksee LLC, producers of the REVEL Race Series, as the new managers of the race.

It was announced in July 2019 that Oregon Health & Science University (OHSU) will be the presenting sponsor of the event for multiple years.

The 2019 event featured an entirely revised route.

The 2020 in-person edition of the race was cancelled due to the coronavirus pandemic, with all registrants given the option of running the race virtually or transferring their entry to 2021 or 2022.

== Winners ==
Winning Times 2007-2025
Ed.	Year	Men's Winner	Time	Women's Winner	Time	References
36th	2007	Carlos Siqueiros (USA)	2:25:27	Mayu Horiki (JPN)	2:53:47	
37th	2008	John Ngigi (KEN)	2:31:25	Kami Semick (USA)	2:45:27	
38th	2009	Jason Finch (USA)	2:24:13	Yuri Yoshizumi (JPN)	2:55:59	
39th	2010	Eric Griffiths (USA)	2:28:42	Kami Semick (USA)	2:52:02	
40th	2011	Ian Nurse (USA)	2:27:38	Marci Klimek (USA)	2:46:27	
41st	2012	Jameson Mora (USA)	2:21:10	Colleen Little (USA)	2:51:35	
42nd	2013	Jameson Mora (USA)	2:20:53	Rachel Jaten (USA)	2:42:13	
43rd	2014	Makoto Ozawa (JPN)	2:23:58	Susan Smith (USA)	2:53:31	
44th	2015	Jameson Mora (USA)	2:28:29	Susie Scott (USA)	2:51:23	
45th	2016	Matthew Palilla (USA)	2:36:25	Kate Landau (USA)	2:38:45	
46th	2017	Teppei Suegami (JPN)	2:23:43	Allison Goldstein (USA)	2:50:26	
47th	2018	Tomonori Sakamoto (JPN)	2:25:02	Laura Lewis (USA)	3:21:40	
48th	2019	Kallin Khan (USA)	2:25:16	Jamie Gibbs (USA)	2:48:01	
—	2020	cancelled due to coronavirus pandemic				
49th	2021	Matt Spear (USA)	2:28:48	Kari Hamilton (USA)	2:53:38	
50th	2022	Matt Spear (USA)	2:37:30	Lydia Tay (CAN)	2:53:38	
51st	2023	Matt Spear (USA)	2:27:51	Rachele Biltoft (USA)	2:55:50	
52nd	2024	Archibald Castell (SWE)	2:22:14	Rachel Peters (USA)	2:48:21	
53rd	2025	Nic Maszk (USA)	2:26:52	Luciana Lenth (USA)	2:53:20	
54th	2026	Connor Ford (USA)	2:27:14	Margaret Glad (USA)	2:52:32	

== See also ==
- Culture of Portland, Oregon
