= Mya Diamond =

Hungarian pornographic actress (born 1981)

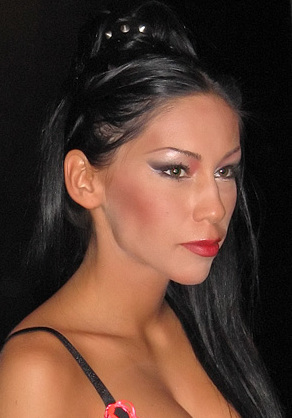
- Diamond in 2005
- Born: Júlia Koroknai; 11 April 1981 (age 45); Marcali, Somogy, Hungary
- Other name: Mia Diamond
- Occupations: Porn actress; erotic model
- Years active: 2002–2014

Júlia Koroknai (born 11 April 1981), known by her stage name Mya Diamond, is a Hungarian erotic model and former pornographic actress. In 2006 she won the Ninfa Award for best actress.

== Biography ==
Diamond, born in Marcali, Hungary, has two younger siblings, a sister and a brother, with her sister being 17 years younger. She grew up in Marcali, a town near Balaton. She spent a lot of time with her grandparents. She says, "They will stay always in my heart." The most important thing in Mya Diamond's life has always been and still is her family.

In school, she was mostly interested in languages. She loved English and German, so she did the intermediate exam when she was 14 years old. Mya eventually won first place in a contest for German language in Hungary. When she finished secondary school, she began studying in university and was working in a hotel at the same time. As a part-time job, she did some fashion modelling. Several months later, she was offered to work as a model in the pornographic business. She is famous for her foot fetish scenes.

She retired from porn movies in 2010 and doing performance on stage until 2014.

== Awards and nominations ==
Year	Award	Result	Category	Work
2005	Ninfa Award	Nominated	Best Actress	Sex Angels
2006	Ninfa Award	Won	Best Actress	Sex Angels 2
2007	AVN Award	Nominated	Female Foreign Performer of the Year	—N/a
2007	AVN Award	Nominated	Best Group Sex Scene – Film	Emperor
2007	AVN Award	Nominated	Best Sex Scene in a Foreign-Shot Production	Sex Angels 2
2007	Viv Thomas Award	Won	Best Hetero Performer	—N/a
2008	Viv Thomas Award	Nominated	Best Female Straight Performer	—N/a
