= Marcali =

- Town
- Flag Coat of arms

- Location of Somogy county in Hungary

- Location of Marcali
- Coordinates: 46.58582°N 17.41279°E
- Country: Hungary
- Region: Southern Transdanubia
- County: Somogy
- District: Marcali
- RC Diocese: Kaposvár

Area
  - Total: 101.5 km^{2} (39.2 sq mi)

Population (2017)
  - Total: 11,216
  - Density: 110.5/km^{2} (286.2/sq mi)
- Demonym: marcali
- Time zone: UTC+1 (CET)
  - Summer (DST): UTC+2 (CEST)
- Postal code: 8700
- Area code: (+36) 85
- Patron Saint: Holy Mary
- NUTS 3 code: HU232
- MP: József Attila Móring (KDNP)
- Website: marcali.hu

Marcali (Hungarian pronunciation: [ˈmɒrtsɒli]; German: Martzal) is a town in Somogy County, Hungary, and the seat of Marcali District.

The settlement is part of the Balatonboglár wine region.

== Geography ==
It lies 14 km south of Lake Balaton, next to the main road 68 and the Somogyszob-Balatonszentgyörgy Railway Line.

== Media ==
Near the village Kisperjés, which belongs to Marcali, there is at 46°36′53.5″N 17°27′53.63″E a mediumwave broadcasting station with a 126 metres tall guyed mast radiator broadcasting on 1188 kHz with 300 kW.

== Notable people ==
- Aurél Bernáth (1895–1982), painter and art theorist
- Béla Pap de Szill (1845–1916), military officer, politician, Minister of Defence (1906)
- Endre Bán (1934–1995), Roman Catholic priest, theologist and professor
- Mya Diamond (born 1981), pornographic actress and nude model
- Árpád Milinte (born 1976), footballer
- Olivér Kovács (born 1990), footballer
- Márta Vass (born 1962), ultramarathon runner
- Beatrix Balogh (born 1974), handballer
- Béla Virág (born 1976), footballer
- Lukács Bőle (born 1990), footballer
- Zoltán Farkas (born 1989), footballer

== Twin towns – sister cities ==
Marcali is twinned with:

- Künzelsau, Germany
- Medulin, Croatia
- Morrovalle, Italy
- Toplița, Romania

== Gallery ==
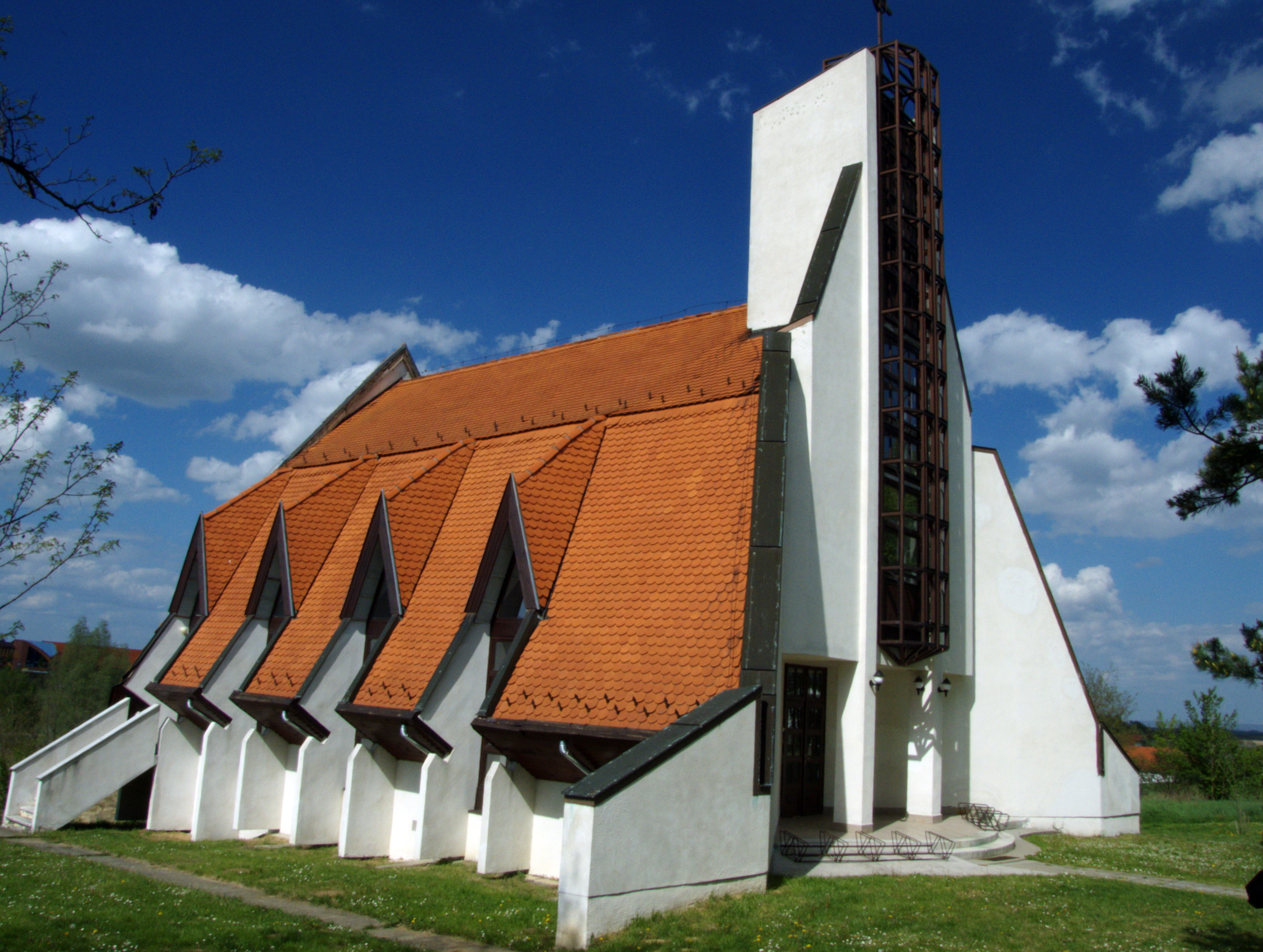
Gisella Church

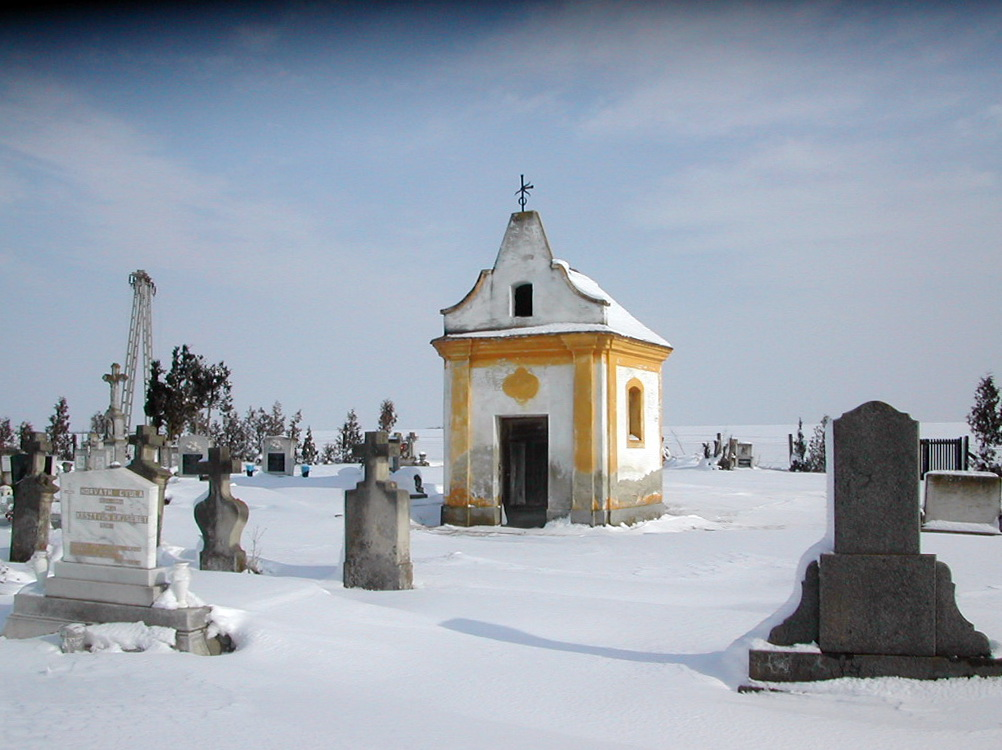
Chapel in the Boronka Cemetery

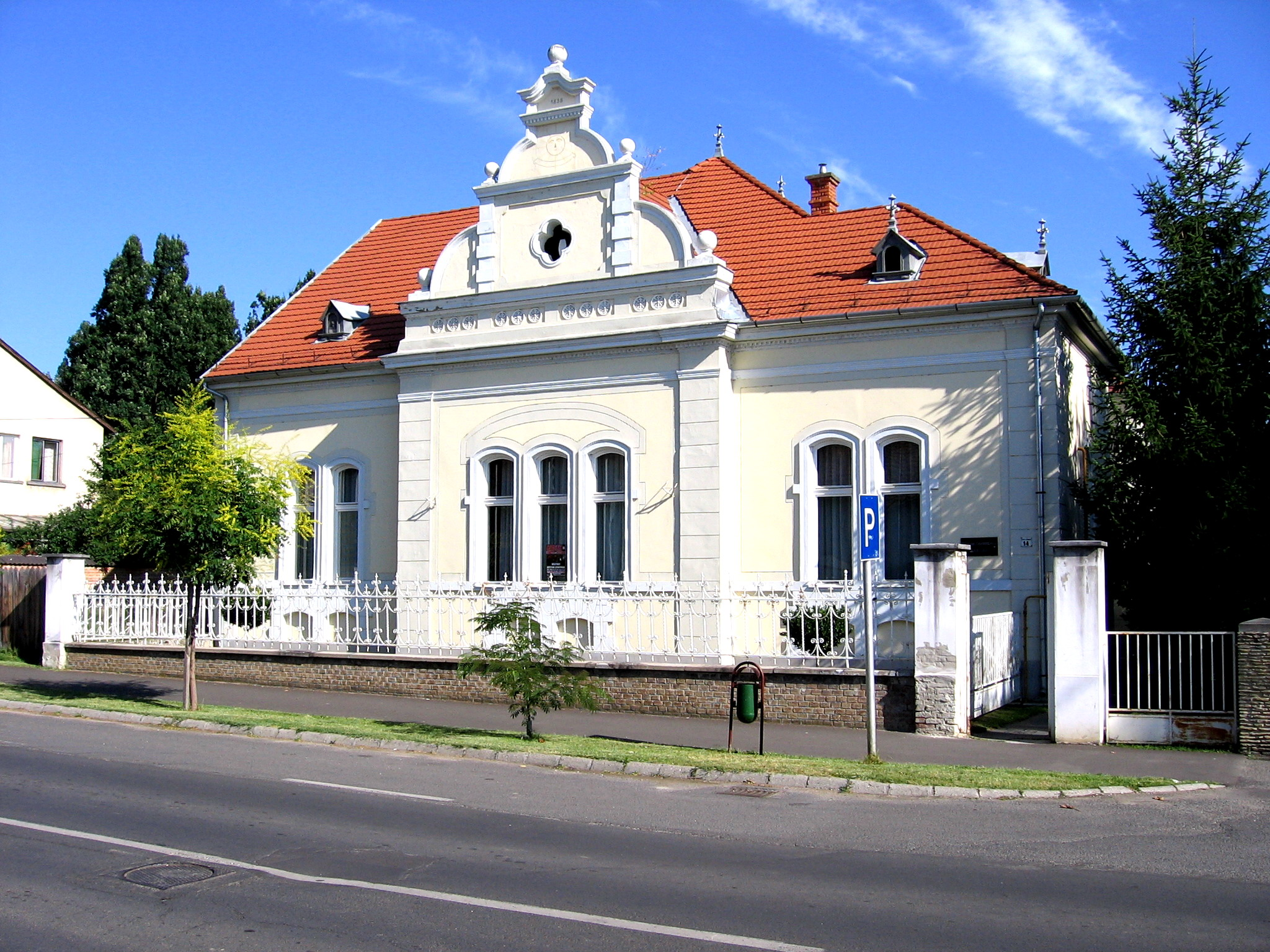
The building of the music school (built in 1898)

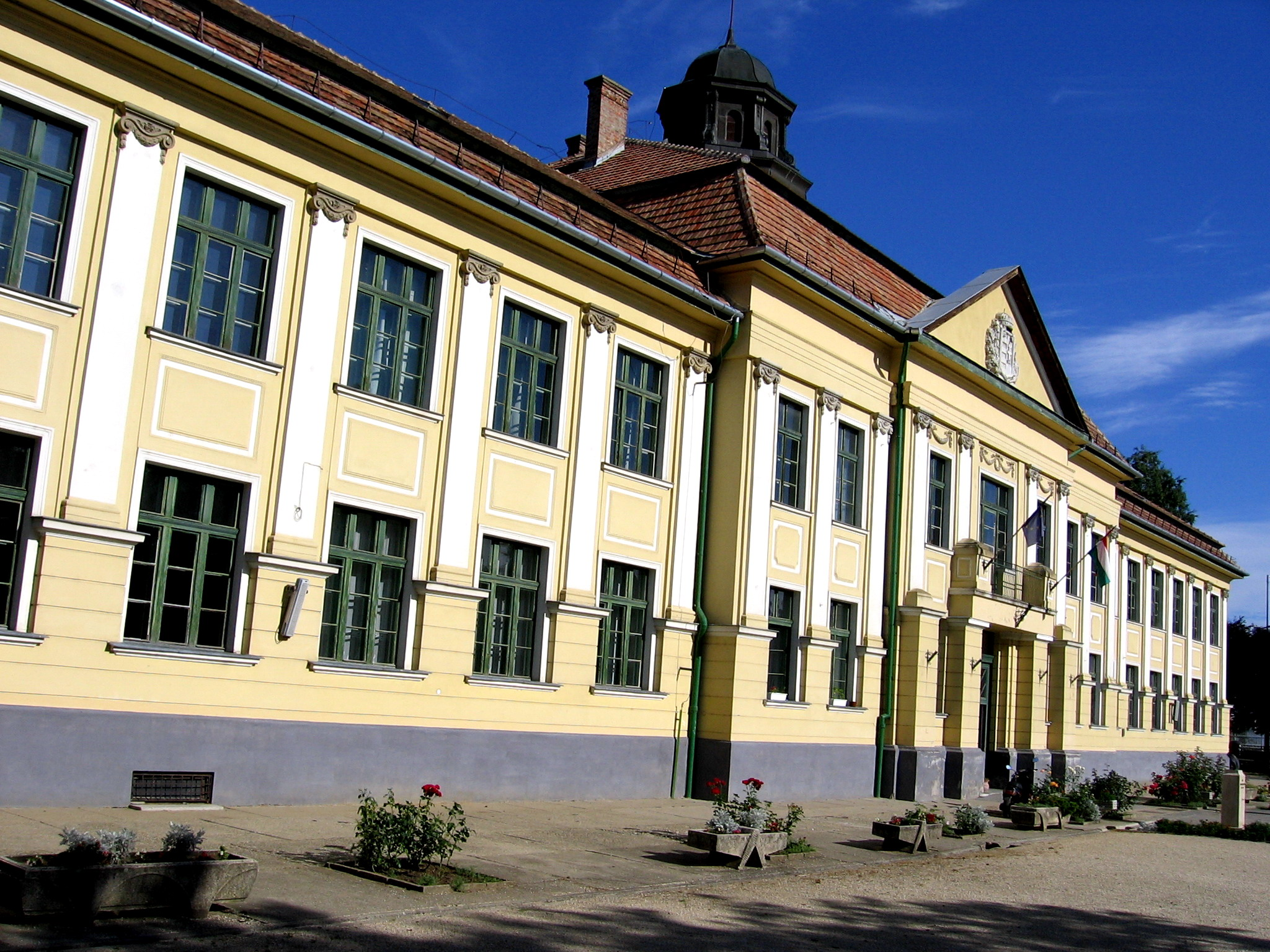
Gáspár Noszlopy Primary School

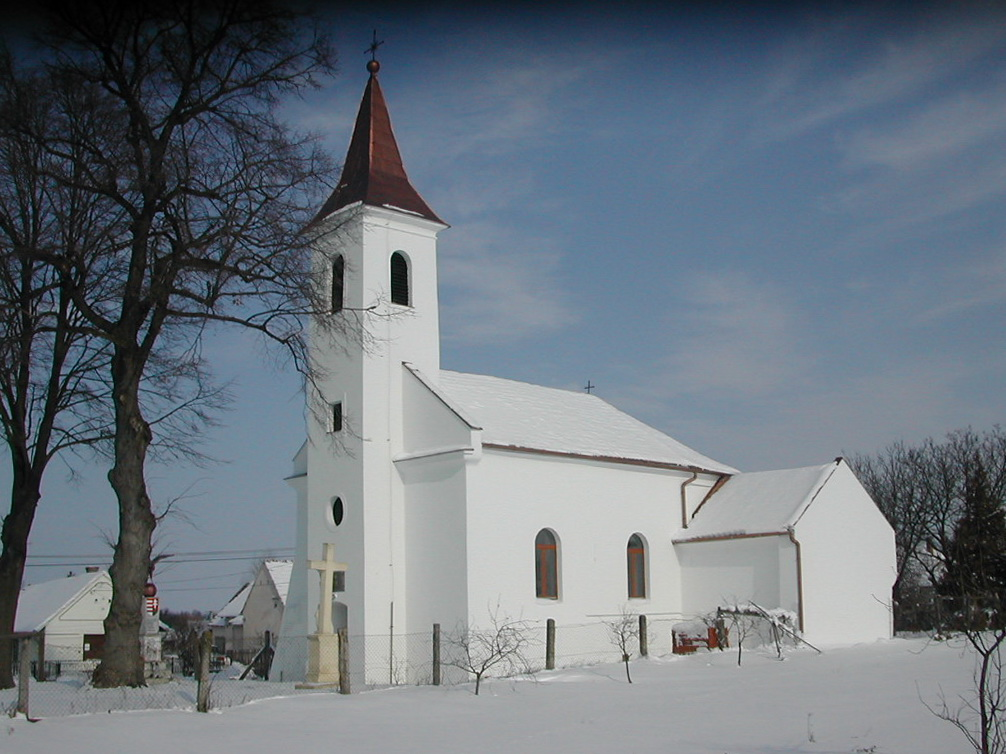
Saint Barbara Church of Boronka
