= Knee Knackering North Shore Trail Run =

Ultramarathon trail run

The Knee Knackering North Shore Trail Run, also known as the Knee Knacker, was established in 1989 and is a 48.6 km (30 miles) ultramarathon trail run in that takes place in British Columbia, in the Greater Vancouver area on the second Saturday of July each year. Due to the municipality's environmental concerns, the field is limited to 262 runners. Because of the race's popularity, the entrants are selected by lottery. In addition to the challenging terrain, the race is well known for its high volunteer-to-runner support ratio and the full banquet held afterward, where all runners receive an award certificate for completing the race.

== Course ==
The course, comprising about 2,600 m of vertical climb and descent, generally follows the Baden-Powell Trail, and traverses the North Shore Mountains from Horseshoe Bay in West Vancouver to Deep Cove in North Vancouver. Both ends of the Baden Powell trail are close to sea level, with a high point of 1224 m (4,016 feet) at the peak of Black Mountain. The course follows a scenic and very technical trail through a coastal British Columbia rainforest. Most of the trail is within the forest, and there are some spectacular vistas at a number of points along the way, particularly at Eagle Bluff.

== Records ==
The course record was set by Nick Elson in 2017, he led from start to finish and completed the course in 4:32.03. This surpassed the record set by Aaron Heidt in 2010, who posted a mark of 4:39.52. The women's record holder is Ellie Greenwood, who clocked 5:06.09 in 2010.
