= Lungile Gongqa =

South African long-distance runner

Personal information
- Born: 22 February 1979 (age 47)
- Height: 162 cm (5 ft 4 in)
- Weight: 53 kg (117 lb)

Sport
- Sport: Track and field
- Event: Marathon

Lungile Gongqa (born 22 February 1979) is a South African long-distance runner who specialises in the marathon. He competed in the men's marathon event at the 2016 Summer Olympics. However, he dropped out of the race before the 35 km mark and did not finish the race. Gongqa won the 2017 Two Oceans Marathon. He hails from Khayelitsha in Cape Town. In 2019, he finished in 2nd place in the men's race at the IAU 50 km World Championships.
