= Ellie Greenwood =

Canadian and British ultramarathon runner

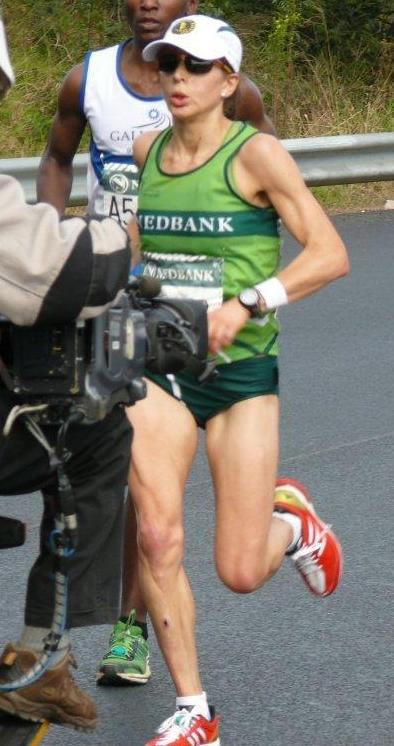

Personal information
- Citizenship: Canadian; British
- Born: 14 March 1979 (age 47) Dundee, Scotland
- Years active: 2005–present

Sport
- Sport: Running
- Event: Ultramarathon
- Club: Vancouver Falcons

Achievements and titles
- Personal bests: Marathon: 2:42:15; 50 km: 3:37:33; 100 km: 7:30:44
Medal record
Ultramarathon
Representing United Kingdom
IAU 100 km World Championships
Gold medal – first place	2010 Gibraltar	100 km
Gold medal – first place	2010 Gibraltar	Women's team
Gold medal – first place	2014 Doha	100 km
Gold medal – first place	2014 Doha	Women's team
IAU 100 km European Championships
Gold medal – first place	2010 Gibraltar	100 km
Gold medal – first place	2010 Gibraltar	Team
- Updated on 3 December 2014

Ellie Greenwood (born 14 March 1979) is a British and Canadian ultramarathon runner. She is a four-time 100km World Champion, winning both individual and team titles in 2010 and 2014. She won the 90 km Comrades Marathon in South Africa in 2014, becoming the first British woman to win the race. Greenwood is also a former champion and course record holder for the Canadian Death Race, Western States 100, and the JFK 50 Mile Run.

In 2011, 2012, and 2014 Ultrarunning Magazine named Greenwood the North American Female Ultrarunner of the Year.

== Early life ==
Greenwood was born in Dundee, Scotland. When she was eight years old, her family moved to Norfolk, England. After graduating from university in 2001, she moved to Canada to work for a UK-based ski tour operator and has lived there ever since.

== Career ==
Greenwood began her ultramarathon career in 2005. One of her first races was the 30-mile Knee Knackering North Shore Trail Run, a relatively short course known for its steep ascent and descent. Outdoor company Montrail began sponsoring Greenwood in 2005.

In her first attempt at the distance, Greenwood won the Elk-Beaver 100k on Vancouver Island in May 2010, setting a new course record (and 100K trail world record) of 7:36, and qualified to represent Great Britain at the 2010 IAU 100 km World Championships. There, after battling with the race leader, 2006 World Champion and compatriot Lizzy Hawker, she took gold in a time of 7:29:05, helping Great Britain to first place in the team event and also in the jointly held IAU 100 km European Championships. In 2010, she also set new course records for the 125-kilometre Canadian Death Race, coming second overall and beating the previous record by more than an hour, and for the Knee Knackering North Shore Trail Run.

In 2011 Greenwood took on the Western States 100 in California and came first. She won the race again in 2012, when she set a new course record of 16:47:19, beating the previous best of 17:37:51 set by Ann Trason in 1994. In 2012, Greenwood also broke the course record for the JFK 50 Mile Run, coming in 10th overall, and was the winner of the Ultra-Trail du Mont-Blanc Courmayeur-Champex-Chamonix 101-km race.

Greenwood has competed four times in South Africa's 90-km Comrades Marathon. She came fourth in 2011 and finished second place in 2012, just 72 seconds behind the winner. Throughout 2013, Greenwood was plagued with injuries. She returned to running slowly, focusing on the 2014 Comrades Marathon to keep her motivated. In 2014, with 18 km to go, she was eight minutes behind the race leader, but she recovered the deficit and won in a time of 6:18:15. Greenwood was the first British woman ever to win Comrades.

In November 2014, Greenwood lined up for the third time at the start of the IAU 100 km World Championships. Having won it in 2010, she led the British team in 2011 but pulled out at the 90 km mark, after suffering from vomiting for 40 km. In the 2014 race, Greenwood took the lead at the 55 km mark and held on to it to win gold in 7:30:48, eight minutes ahead of second placed Chiyuki Mochizuki of Japan and the third best time in the all-time list of British performances. Jo Zakrzewski of the UK came third in 7:42:02. With Jo Meek coming fourth, Britain also won gold in the team event.

Other records include the Squamish 50k in 2014 (5:20:39), Run for the Toad 50k (Ontario) in 2011 (3:38:01), Stormy 50 miler (Squamish, 2009, 7:16), and Wild Horse Traverse 50k in 2018 (4:56:19).

In the marathon distance, she has won the Vancouver (2012, 2:42:15); Calgary (2010, 2:52:21, then a course record), Edmonton (2010, 2:49:54; and 2011, 2:47:14, then a course record), Moray (2013, 2:53:52) marathons.

In ultramarathons, she has also won the Chuckanut 50k (2016, 4:11:58; 2014, 4:11:48; 2012, 4:09:27, course record; 2011, 4:12:21; 2009, 4:34), Les Templiers 75k (2015, 7:58:05), Glacier Grind 44k (2015, 4:53:55); Squamish 50mile (2012, 8:04:36); Ultra Race of Champions 100 km (Wintergreen, VA, 2012, 9:04:19); White River 50 miler (2012, 7:40:02); American River 50 miler (2012, 6:18; 2011, 6:25:42), Ultramaraton de los Andes 50 miler (2011, 9:42:18), Dirty Duo 50 km (North Vancouver, 2009, 4:24); Orcas Island 50 km (2009, 5:18), and the Scorched Sole 50 miler (2010, 1st overall, 7:58:49).

== Personal life ==
Greenwood became a naturalized Canadian citizen in 2015. She lives in North Vancouver, British Columbia and worked full-time as a running coach as of 2023.
