= IAU 50 km World Championships =

Global ultrarunning competition

- Sport: Ultramarathon
- First season: 2005
- Country: Worldwide
- Website: https://iau-ultramarathon.org/

The IAU 50 km World Championships is an annual, global ultrarunning competition over 50 kilometres organized by the International Association of Ultrarunners (IAU).

The competition began life as the IAU 50 km World Trophy in 2005. It served as the final leg of the IAU 50 km Challenge circuit, with runners gaining qualification through performances on one of the nine preceding qualifying races. The winners of the men's and women's trophy were decided by the best aggregate time of their World Trophy race plus their best time from the qualifying round. The race moved away from aggregate scoring, with the World Trophy race becoming a straight final, and it continued in this format up to 2014. The 2008 and 2013 editions were cancelled due to the number of world championships the IAU was already organised that year.

The inaugural World Championship event took place in Doha, Qatar in December 2015. This included men's and women's races with individual and team elements. The team titles were decided by the three best combined times set by a nation's runners at the competition. For 2014 to 2017 it was agreed that the competition would be hosted in Doha for those years, moving the competition away from its tradition of changing host each year. The competition signalled commitment to the sport in Qatar, with Doha hosting its first ultramarathon in the months preceding the 2014 championship.

It is one of four world championships organised by the IAU, with the others being the IAU 100 km World Championships, IAU 24 Hour World Championship and the IAU Trail Running World Championships.

The inaugural edition in 2005 incorporated a European Championship race. Oleg Kharitonov was the men's winner, with World Trophy winner Sandor Barcza as runner-up and Stefano Sartori in third. The European Championship and World Trophy places matched on the women's side, with Heather Foundling-Hawker winner of both. The European Championship was abandoned after the launch of the World Championships. It had only been held twice (Mario Ardemagni and Danielle Sanderson were the 2004 winners).

== Editions ==
Editions in gold were held as IAU 50 km World Trophy Final

Edition	Year	City	Country	Date	No. of athletes	No. of nations
1st	2005	Palermo	Italy	16 October		
2nd	2006	Winschoten	Netherlands	16 September		
3rd	2007	Palermo	Italy	14 October		
4th	2008	—	—	—	—	—
5th	2009	Gibraltar	United Kingdom	31 October		
6th	2010	Galway	Ireland	29 August		
7th	2011	Assen	Netherlands	20 August		
8th	2012	Vallecrosia	Italy	20 October		
9th	2013	—	—	—	—	—
10th	2014	Doha	Qatar	31 October		
1st	2015	Doha	Qatar	4 December		
2nd	2016	Doha	Qatar	11 November		
3rd	2017		canceled			
4th	2018		canceled			
5th	2019	Brașov	Romania	1 September	73	
6th	~~2020~~	Aqaba	Jordan	~~27 November~~		
7th	~~2021~~	Taipei	Taiwan	~~31 October~~		
8th	2023	Hyderabad	India	5 November	77	17
9th	2026	New Delhi	India	14 March	69	15

== Medal summary ==
=== Men ===
Year	Gold		Silver		Bronze	
2005	Sandor Barcza (FRA)	6:05:33	Oleg Kharitonov (RUS)	6:15:40	Aleksandr Boltachev (RUS)	6:21:56
2006	Dimitry Bula (BLR)	3:06:52	Dominic Croft (GBR)	3:08:25	Rod Harris (GBR)	3:09:02
2007	Marc Papanikitas (BEL)	3:06:36	Julian Rendall (GBR)	3:09:39	Bernard Santner (AUT)	3:12:44
2009	Lucas Nonyana (RSA)	2:58:03	Paul Molyneux (GBR)	3:00:15	Michael Wardian (USA)	3:00:56
2010	Collen Makaza (ZIM)	2:47:22	Sandile Ngunuza (RSA)	2:53:06	Michael Wardian (USA)	2:54:57
2011	Eliot Biwott (KEN)	2:54:53	Pieter Vermeesch (BEL)	2:57:23	Kaito Iwayama (JPN)	2:59:12
2012	Steven Way (GBR)	2:53:41	Collen Makaza (ZIM)	2:57:49	Paul Martelletti (GBR)	2:58:18
2014	Collen Makaza (ZIM)	3:00:41	Phil Anthony (GBR)	3:01:26	Harm Sengers (NED)	3:05:01
2015	Tony Migliozzi (USA)	2:52:08	Arnold Kiptaoi (KEN)	2:55:34	Samuel Ongaki (KEN)	2:56:15
2016	Tony Migliozzi (USA)	2:54:02	Tyler Andrews (USA)	2:56:04	Collen Makaza (ZIM)	2:56:58
2017	Not held					
2018	Not held					
2019	Iraitz Arrospide (ESP)	2:47:42	Lungile Gongqa (RSA)	2:48:26	Daniel Nash (GBR)	2:49:01
2021	Not held					
2023	Chakib Lachgar (ESP)	2:48:20	Alejandro Jiménez (ESP)	2:49:30	Jesús Olmos (ESP)	2:50:12
2026	Alex Milne (GBR)	2:46:09	Charlie Davis (GBR)	2:47:15	Logan Smith (GBR)	2:47:30

=== Women ===
Year	Gold		Silver		Bronze	
2005	Heather Foundling-Hawker (GBR)	7:20:46	Monica Casiraghi (ITA)	7:32:45	Lorena Di Vito (ITA)	7:35:14
2006	Zelah Morrall (GBR)	3:31:19	Sarah Tucker (GBR)	3:32:08	Fiona Davies (GBR)	3:35:15
2007	Monica Carlin (ITA)	3:32:17	June Petrie (AUS)	3:35:38	Sabine Hofer (AUT)	3:36:07
2009	Kami Semick (USA)	3:29:48	Monica Carlin (ITA)	3:37:10	Lesley Train-Austin (RSA)	3:38:23
2010	Susan Harrison (GBR)	3:15:43	Mary Coordt (USA)	3:28:31	Irene Kalter (NED)	3:34:22
2011	Emma Gooderham (GBR)	3:17:30	Susan Harrison (GBR)	3:25:05	Joasia Zakrzewski (GBR)	3:26:37
2012	Helen Taranowski (GBR)	3:30:43	Emma Gooderham (GBR)	3:33:32	Michele Chiefari (ITA)	3:37:45
2014	Emily Harrison (USA)	3:32:30	Joasia Zakrzewski (GBR)	3:33:23	Catrin Jones (CAN)	3:37:57
2015	Camille Herron (USA)	3:20:59	Marija Vrajić (CRO)	3:28:15	Catrin Jones (CAN)	3:28:19
2016	Risper Kimaiyo (KEN)	3:22:45	Nele Alder-Baerens (GER)	3:25:53	Amy Clements (GBR)	3:26:17
2017	Not held					
2018	Not held					
2019	Alyson Dixon (GBR)	3:07:20	Helen Davies (GBR)	3:09:16	Alicia Pérez (ESP)	3:15:09
2023	Carla Molinaro (GBR)	3:18:23	Andrea Pomaranski (USA)	3:19:07	Sarah Webster (GBR)	3:20:07
2026	Naomi Robinson (GBR)	3:13:40	Katrina Ballantyne (GBR)	3:17:25	Monika Brzozowska (POL)	3:19:03

=== Men's team ===
Year	Gold		Silver		Bronze	
2015	Kenya (KEN)	8:49:09	United States (USA)	8:57:52	Australia (AUS)	9:37:51
2016	United States (USA)	8:56:37	Great Britain (GBR)	8:59:29	Germany (GER)	9:45:58
2017	Not held					
2018	Not held					
2019	South Africa (RSA)	8:28:38	Germany (GER)	8:35:52	Great Britain (GBR)	8:41:00
2023	Spain (ESP)	8:28:02	India (IND)	8:48:50	Great Britain (GBR)	8:51:58
2026	Great Britain (GBR)	8:20:54	India (IND)	8:52:07	United States (USA)	8:53:52

=== Women's team ===
Year	Gold		Silver		Bronze	
2015	Croatia (CRO)	10:50:08	Canada (CAN)	11:10:41	Australia (AUS)	11:31:40
2016	Great Britain (GBR)	10:36:01	United States (USA)	10:40:00	Croatia (CRO)	11:26:36
2017	Not held					
2018	Not held					
2019	Great Britain (GBR)	9:39:33	United States (USA)	10:03:18	Austria (AUT)	10:19:58
2023	Great Britain (GBR)	9:59:07	United States (USA)	10:18:11	Croatia (CRO)	10:53:20
2026	Great Britain (GBR)	9:53:41	Poland (POL)	10:01:34	Japan (JPN)	10:38:03

== See also ==
- Ultramarathon
- International Association of Ultrarunners
- IAU 100 km World Championships
