= Jonas Buud =

Swedish long-distance runner

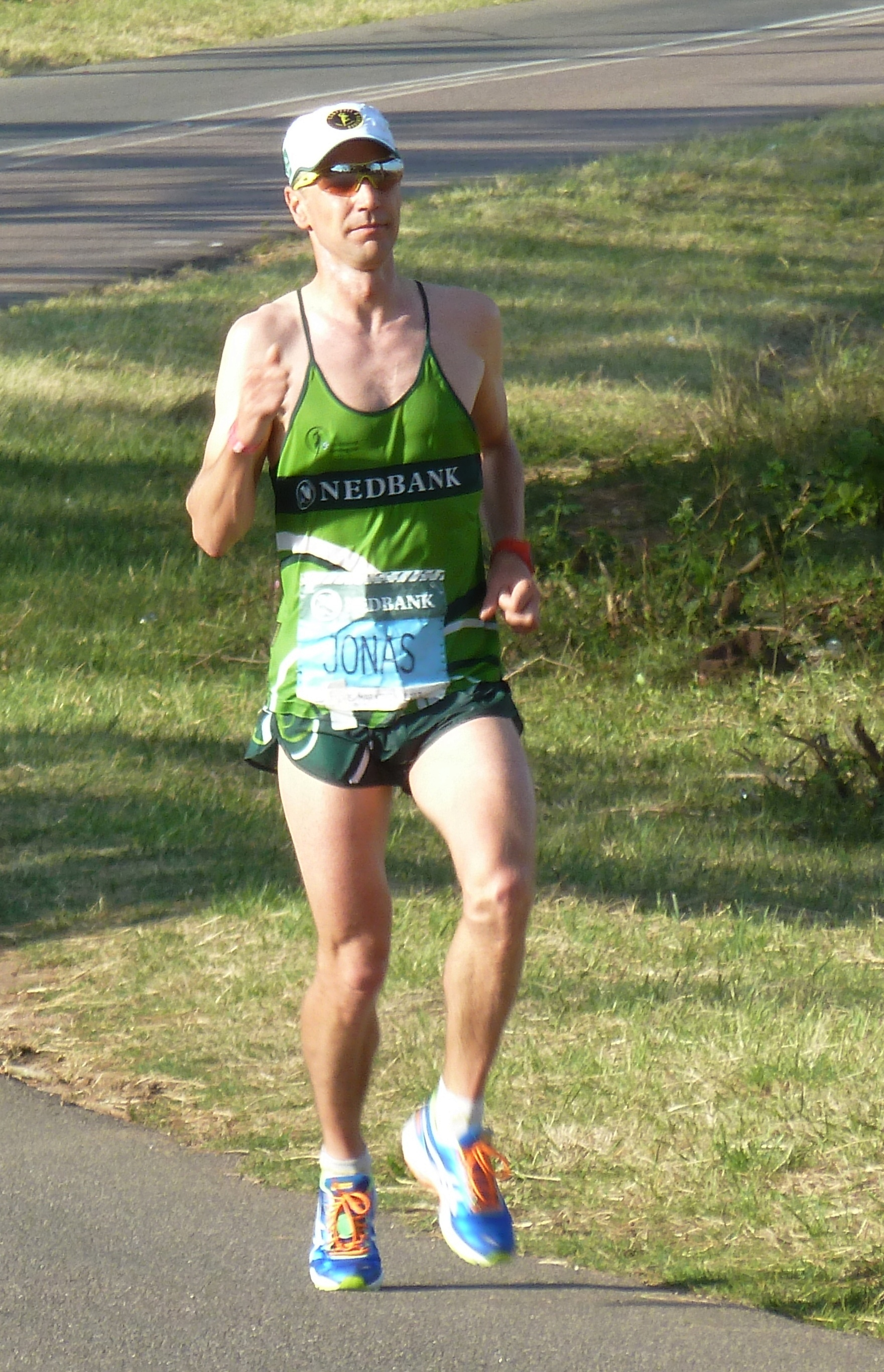
Buud in the Comrades Marathon, 2013, where he finished second

Jonas Buud born 28 March 1974, is a Swedish ultra-distance runner who lives in Mora, central Sweden.

Buud is a former orienteer who changed to long-distance running and has achieved international success. He became European Champion over 100 kilometres in 2009 and 2010, and was runner-up at the World Championships in 2009, 2010, 2012, and 2014. In the combined European/World championship over 100 km on April 22, 2012, he finished second in both races with a time of 6:28:59, a new Swedish record.

In 2014 Buud for the eighth consecutive year won the Swiss Alpine Marathon, one of Europe's largest ultra marathon races, over a 78 km distance in the Alps. In 2013 he also finished second in the world's oldest and largest ultra-distance race, the Comrades Marathon in South Africa, to achieve the best Swedish placement in the Comrades' 88-year history.

In 2015 he won the World championship over 100 km with the time 6:22:48, a new Swedish record.

== Wins ==
- Swiss Alpine Marathon 2007
- Swiss Alpine Marathon 2008
- Swiss Alpine Marathon 2009
- Karlstad 6H 2010
- Täby Extreme Challenge 2010, new Swedish record over 100 miles at 12:32:03
- Swiss Alpine Marathon 2010
- Swiss Alpine Marathon 2011
- Swiss Alpine Marathon 2012
- Swiss Alpine Marathon 2013
- Swiss Alpine Marathon 2014
- Ultravasan 2014
- Ultravasan 2015
- World Championship over 100 km 2015
- Tarawera Ultramarathon 2016
