= Giorgio Calcaterra =

Italian long-distance and ultramarathon runner (born 1972)

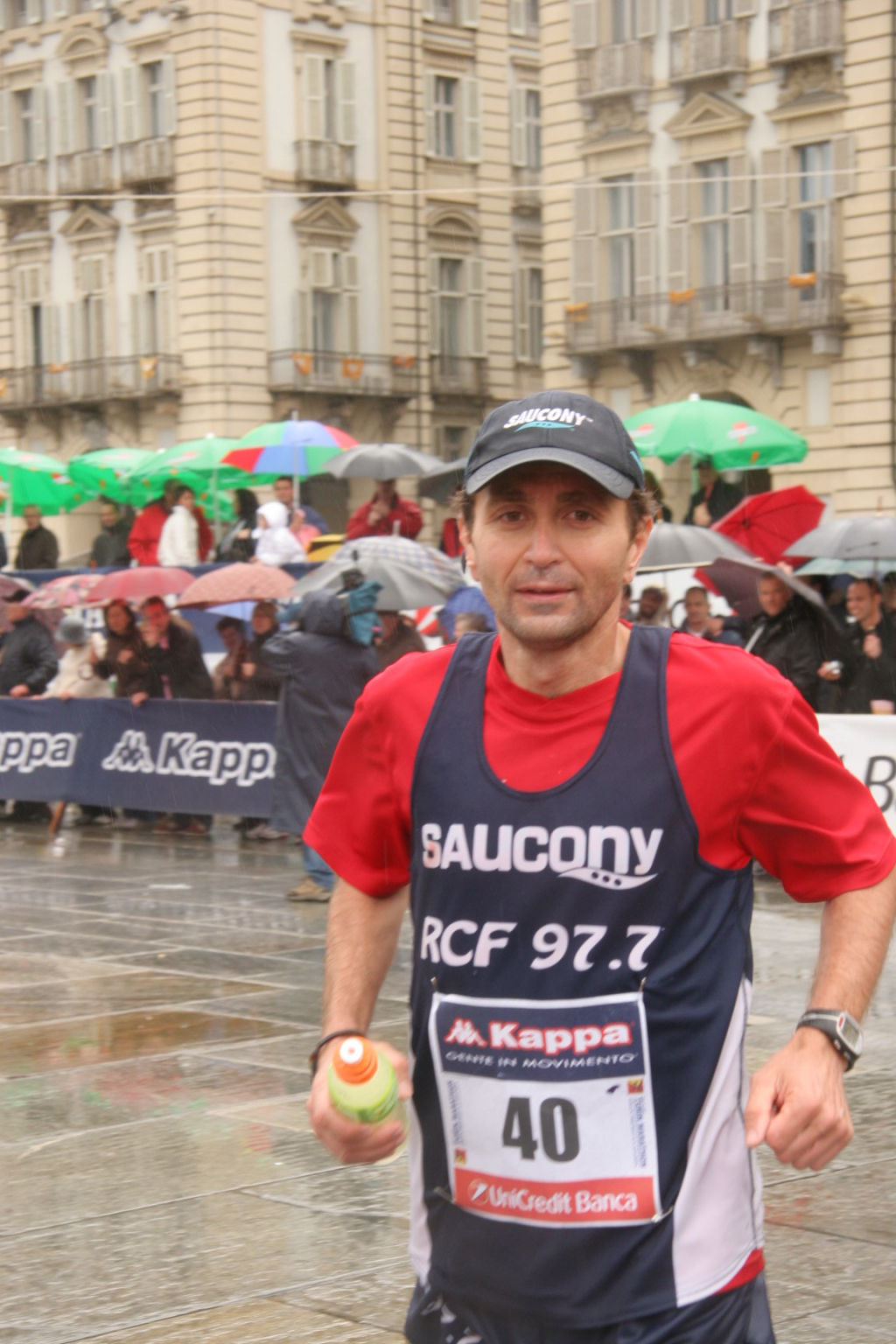
- Giorgio Calcaterra at 2009 Turin Marathon

Personal information
- Nationality: Italian
- Born: 11 February 1972 (age 54) Rome, Italy
- Height: 1.73 m (5 ft 8 in)
- Weight: 63 kg (139 lb)

Sport
- Country: Italy
- Sport: Athletics
- Event: Ultramarathon
- Club: Running Club Futura
- Retired: No

Achievements and titles
- Personal bests: Marathon: 2h13'15" (2000); 100 km: 6h23'20 (2012)
Medal record
Men's athletics
Representing Italy
100 km World Championships
Gold medal – first place	2008 Tarquinia	100 km
Gold medal – first place	2011 Winschoten	100 km
Gold medal – first place	2012 Seregno	100 km
Silver medal – second place	2009 Torhout	100 km
Bronze medal – third place	2015 Winschoten	100 km

Giorgio Calcaterra (born 11 February 1972 in Rome) is an Italian ultramarathoner, three times world champion of the 100 km. He is the most successful athlete at the IAU 100 km European Championships, being a three-time winner and also a silver and bronze medallist from 2008 to 2015.

In 2000, he ran 20 marathons under 2 hours and 20 minutes. He was the world leader of the 100 km top lists from 2008 to 2012. In 2003, he won the Helsinki City Marathon and in 2005 he won the Utrecht Marathon.

He is a three-time Italian winner of the Wings for Life World Run. In 2016, he was the world champion of this race. He ran 88.44 km, the world record.

Calcaterra has been a vegetarian since the age of 15 and in 2019 became a vegan for ethical reasons.

== Personal best ==
- 100 km: 6:23:20" (Seregno, 24 April 2012)
- Wings for Life World Run: 88.44 km

Also Connemara International Ultra Marathon course record holder 63 km 3:56

== Achievements ==
Year	Competition	Venue	Position	Event	Performance	Notes
2008	100 km World Championships	(Italy) Tarquinia	1st	100 km	6h37'41"	
2009	100 km World Championships	(Belgium) Torhout	2nd	100 km	6h42'05"	
2011	100 km World Championships	(Netherlands) Winschoten	1st	100 km	6h27'32"	
2012	100 km World Championships	(Italy) Seregno	1st	100 km	6h23'20"	
2015	100 km World Championships	(Netherlands) Winschoten	3rd	100 km	6h36'49"	
