= Bán (surname) =

Bán is a surname. Notable people with the surname include:

- Bán Noémi, Hungarian-American Holocaust survivor
- Endre Bán, Hungarian Catholic priest
- Ferenc Bán, Hungarian architect
- Frigyes Bán, Hungarian screenwriter and film director
- Zsófia Bán, Hungarian writer
