= River Shimanto Ultramarathon =

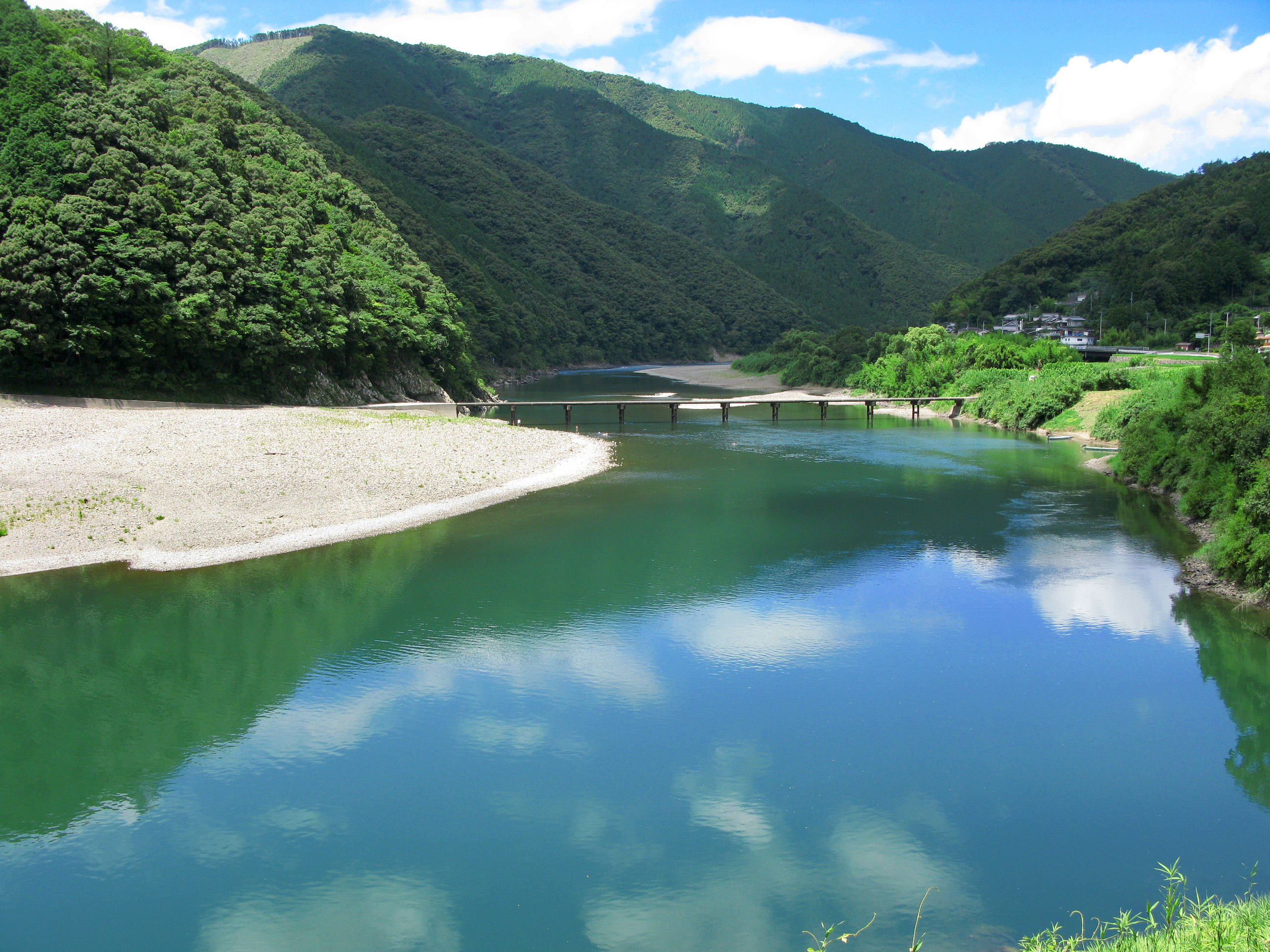
- Shimanto River Kochi Prefecture
- Date: October (Annually)
- Location: Kochi Japan
- Event type: ultramarathon
- Distance: 100km & 60km
- Primary sponsor: Shimanto, Kōchi (city)

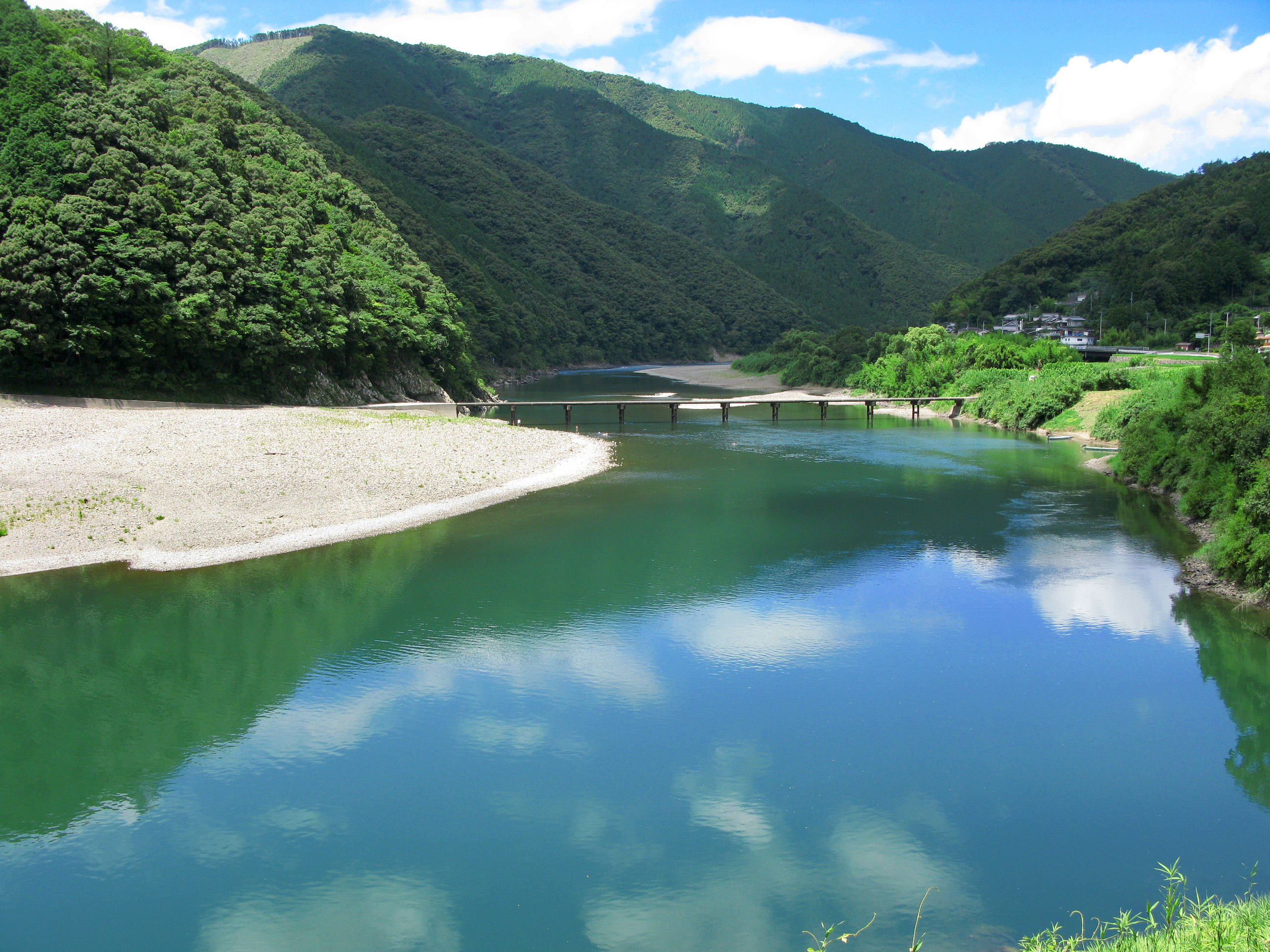
Shimanto River and Iwama Bridge (Shimanto, Kōchi)

The River Shimanto Ultramarathon, also referred to as Shimantogawa Ultra Marathon (四万十川ウルトラマラソン), is a 100 km and 60 km ultramarathon foot road race event held annually in October in Kochi, Japan since 1995. It is an official 100 km and 60 km event endorsed by JAAF. Its 1998 event was held as IAU 100 km World Championship. Time limit for the 100 km race is 14 hours, and that for the 60 km race is 9 hours and 30 minutes.

== 100km Results ==
2013
2,000 participants were accepted out of 6,267 entries over all. In 100 km race, 1,091 runners finished out of 1,466 starters.
Men : Yoshikazu Hara (原 良和) 6:48:43 / Ladies : Tomoko Hara (原 朋子) 8:04:38

2012
2,000 participants were accepted out of 4,859 entries over all. In 100 km race, 1,072 runners finished out of 1,475 starters.
Men : Yoshikazu Hara (原 良和) 6:45:45 / Ladies : Tomoko Hara (原 朋子) 8:08:50

2011
Men : Yoshikazu Hara (原 良和) 6:45:45 / Ladies : Mikie Sakane (坂根 充紀栄) 8:07:16
