= Endre Bán =

Hungarian Catholic priest and theologian (1934–1995)

- Native name: Bán Endre
- Appointed: 1957
- Other post: Vicar general at Pécs

Personal details
- Born: 1 June 1934 Marcali, Hungary
- Died: 24 July 1995. Szombathely, Hungary
- Denomination: Catholic Church

Endre Bán (1 June 1934 in Marcali, Hungary–24 July 1995 in Szombathely, Hungary) was a Hungarian Catholic priest, theologian, and professor.

Bán went to secondary grammar school in Pécs, called Nagy Lajos Gimnázium, where he graduated in 1952. Subsequently, he attended at the Theological College (Hittudományi Akadémia) in Budapest. He became a priest in 1957. He graduated as the doctor of theology in 1958. He was not allowed by the Communist authorities to work as a priest between 1962 and 1965. After serving as a curate and parish priest, from 1991 he served as a Cathedral prebendary, vicar general of the Bishop, prelate of the Pope and rector of the Theological College of Pécs.
