= Tatyana Zhyrkova =

Russian ultramarathon runner and athletics competitor

Tatiana Zhyrkova
Personal information
- Nationality: Russian
- Citizenship: Soviet Union; Russia
- Born: 12 December 1968 (age 56) Tyungyulyu, Russian
- Occupation: athletics competitor

Sport
- Country: Russia
- Sport: Athletics

Tatiana Zhyrkova (born 12 December 1968) is a Russian long-distance runner who competes in ultrarunning disciplines. She is a three times champion of the IAU 100 km World Championships.

Zhyrkova is a three-time 100 km world champion in 2002, 2004 and 2008, and twice European champion of the 100 km in 2003 and 2008. In addition, she holds the European record for the 100 km on the road in 7 hours 10 minutes and 32 seconds at the European 100 km Championships in Winschoten in 2004.

== Personal records ==
Ultra statistics of Tatiana Zhyrkova according to Road Race Management

- 10,000m: 32:28
- Half marathon: 1:13:36 (2003)
- Marathon: 2:27:06 (2005)
- 100 km Road: 7:10:32 (2004).
