= Márta Vass =

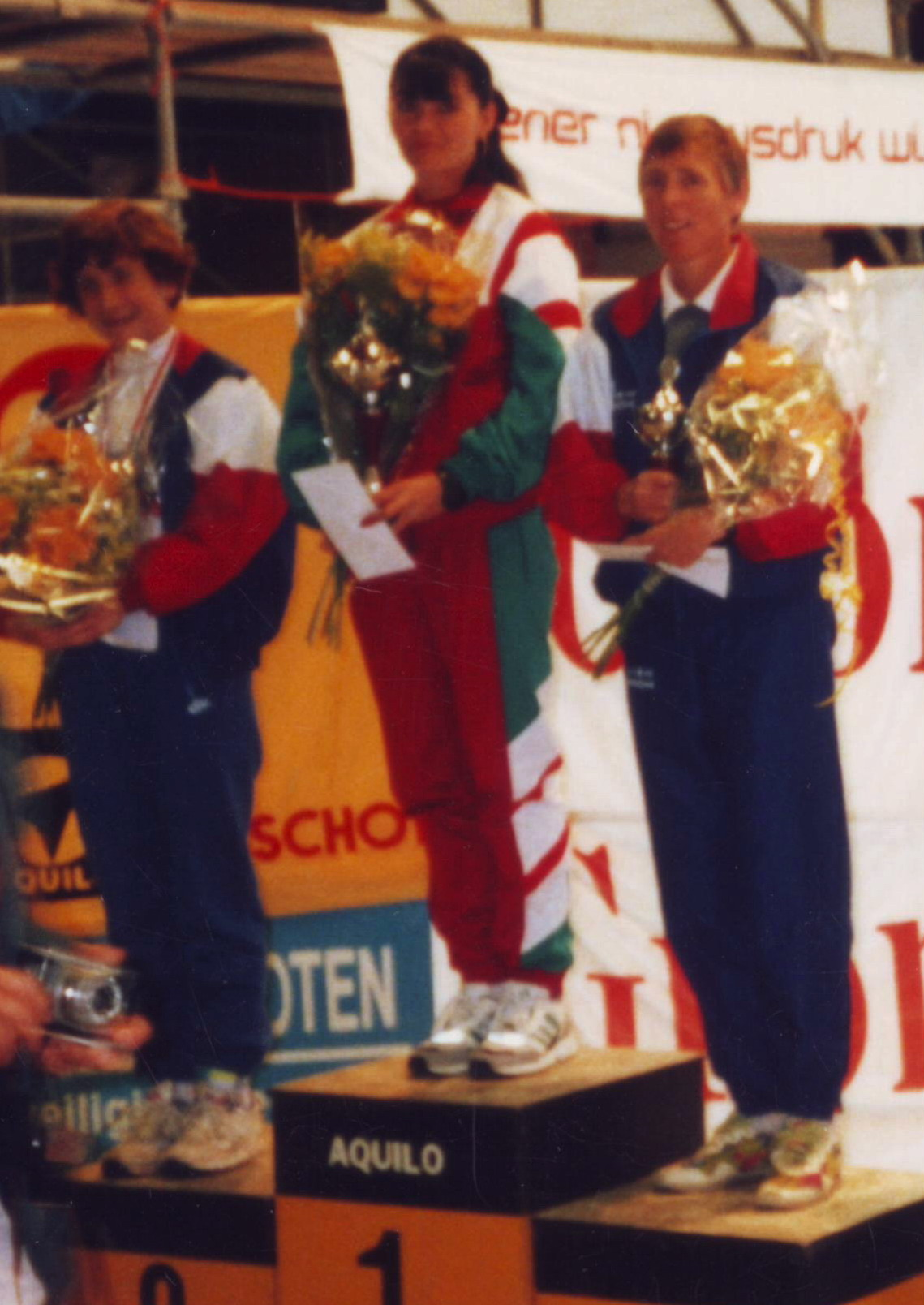
- Márta Vass, IAU 100km European champion

Personal information
- National team: Hungary
- Born: July 6, 1962 (age 63) Marcali, Hungary

Sport
- Sport: Ultramarathon
- Club: TOYOTA-Szupermaraton FC
Medal record
Gold medal – first place	1993 IAU European 100km Championships	Winschoten
Silver medal – second place	1993 IAU European 100km Team Championships	Winschoten
Silver medal – second place	1992 IAU 100 km World Championships	Palamos
Bronze medal – third place	1991 IAU 100km World Championships	Faenza
Bronze medal – third place	1990 IAU 100km World Championships	Duluth
Silver medal – second place	1988 IAU 100km World Championships	Santander
Gold medal – first place	1994 Comrades Marathon	Team
Bronze medal – third place	1994 Comrades Marathon	Individual

Márta Vass (Hungarian pronunciation: [ˈma:rtə ˈvɑːʃ], born July 6, 1962, in Marcali and raised in Nemesdéd, Hungary) is a Hungarian ultramarathon runner, former IAU100km European champion and multiple IAU 100 km World Championship medallist.

== Athletic career ==
Vass is Hungary's first internationally recognized female ultra-runner. During her career she set several national records in the 100 km event. Her outstanding accomplishments include the European 100 kilometer Championship title in 1993. At the same championship she led the Hungarian women’s team (including Ágnes Bozán and Tímea Bontovics) to the second place of the podium. Her top rivals included Great Britain's Hilary Walker and Eleanor Adams-Robinson.

Vass also has four IAU 100 km World Championship medals under her belt: two silver ( Santander 1988, Palamos 1992) and two bronze (Duluth 1990, Faenza 1991) ones.

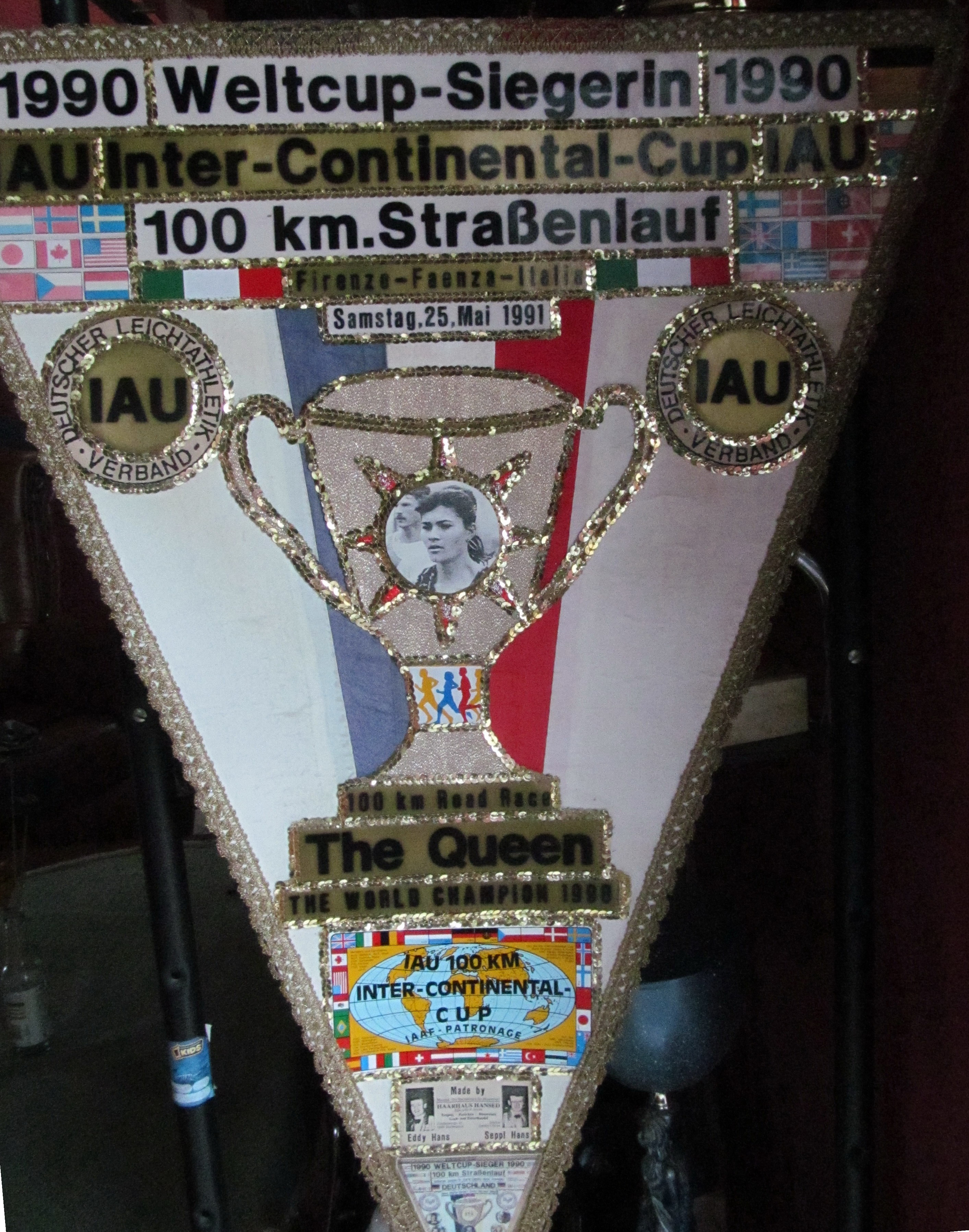
Trophy of Marta Vass, The Queen, IAU Intercontinental 100km Cup Winner, 1990

She took third place with a strong performance of 6 hours 51 minutes and 4 seconds behind world champions Valentina Lyakhova (Валентина Васильевна Ляхова ) and Valentina Shatyaeva (Шатяева, Валентина Николаевна) in the grueling up-run of the Comrades Marathon in 1994.

Vass was the five-time female winner of the renowned Night of Flanders 100 km race De Nacht van Vlaanderen organized in Torhout, Belgium during midsummer.

Due to her four consecutive victories between 1990 and 1993, Vass became an iconic figure of the prestigious Vienna–Bratislava–Budapest Supermarathon, a five-day stage race covering over 350 km.

Being one of the handful Hungarian ultra-runners to have finished on the podium at IAU championships, Vass was inducted in the Hungarian Ultrarunners' Hall of Fame in January 2016.

== Professional life ==
Vass is a teacher of mathematics and chemistry, living with her husband György Pék (former handball player and referee) and daughter Eszter in Budapest.

== Awards ==
- Life Achievement Award for Ultrarunning 2010
- Hungarian Ultrarunners' Hall of Fame 2016
