= Stéphanie Gicquel =

French lawyer, explorer, and athlete (born 1982)

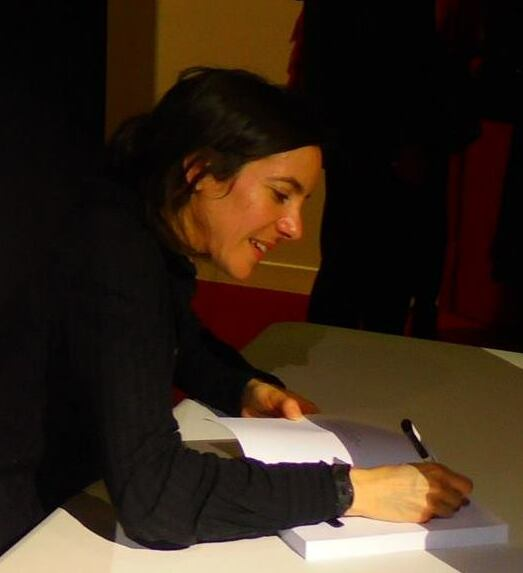

Personal information
- National team: France
- Born: July 9, 1982 (age 44) Carcassonne (France)
- Height: 160 cm (5 ft 3 in)
- Weight: 43 kg (95 lb; 6 st 11 lb)
- Website: stephaniegicquel.com

Sport
- Sport: Athleticism, ultra-running
- Club: Stade Français Athlétisme
- Coached by: Jérémy Cabadet (2023-) & Alain Elie (2022-) Frédéric Barreda (2019-2023)

Stéphanie Gicquel is a French athlete, M&A lawyer, author and speaker born in Carcassonne on July 9, 1982, ultra-distance runner and French 24-hour champion in 2018 and 2022, vice-European 24-hour champion in 2022, holder of the French athletics record in the 24-hour discipline (253.58 km) and vice-world champion in the 100 km with the French athletics team. She is also a writer, author of several books on her expeditions and on running. A figure of adaptation in extreme conditions, she participates in work with experts and scientists on the capacity of the human body to adapt to environmental stresses in the context of global warming, and the impact of movement and nutrition on well-being and performance.

== Biography ==
Stéphanie Gicquel was born in Carcassonne in July 1982. She later attended HEC Paris, where she would meet her future husband Jérémie.

In 2018, she became French national champion at the 24-hour running race in Albi (215.384 km) and finished 7th at the World Championships organized the following year (240.6 km). In 2022, a year after a serious accident having immobilized her for several months, she regained the title of champion of France during the 24-hour running race in Brive (240.028 km) by then improving the record of this event having notably hosted the world championships. She also finished vice-champion of France in the 100 km running distance in 2021 and 2022.

She was selected with the French athletics team for the 100 km World Championships in Berlin (August 27, 2022) and the 24-hour European Championships in Verona (September 17, 2022): vice-world champion with the French athletics team at the 100 km event, she won silver again three weeks with the French athletics team at the 24-hour European Championships and also became the 24-hour vice European champion, improving the French national record (253.58 km run in 24 hours). She was elected athlete of the month for September 2022 by the French Athletics Federation. Stephanie Gicquel trains regularly at INSEP, where she also participates in research programs on the body's adaptation to environmental stress. She is the first French athlete to achieve five international-level performances in long-distance and ultra-distance races during the same sporting season (in 11 months).

Stephanie Gicquel is also notable for taking part (along with her husband) in a cross country trek from Hercules between 14 November 2014 and 27 January 2015. The expedition (which did not use sled dogs or kites) covered 2,045 km in 74 days with temperature dropping to -50 °C during several days, thus making Gicquel the record holder for the longest assisted journey across Antarctica on skis by a woman. . This expedition remains controversial as the presence of the norwegian polar guide Are Johansen was omitted in the media. She also notably ran a marathon around the North Pole in temperatures down to −30 °C. In 2018, she won the Grand Raid du Morbihan, running 177 km in 23 hours 46 minutes. She won this ultra-trail again in 2023 in 18 hours 38 minutes, improving by more than an hour the women's record for the event previously held by Nathalie Mauclair. She also improved the women's record for the Millau 100 km in 2023 during the 51st edition of this race which she won in 8 hours and 21 minutes despite the intense heat. In 2024, she becomes the first athlete to win the Grand Raid du Morbihan three times and improved again the women's record for this 175 km ultra-trail in 16 hours and 33 minutes, running more than 10.5 km/h on average.

In 2019, Stéphanie Gicquel finished third in the World Marathon Challenge, a competition of 7 marathons over seven days and on seven continents.

In 2024, she helped establish the world record for 24-hour running in mixed relay (416 km) by carrying out the first relay on the athletics track at Stade Charlety at the invitation of the French radio RMC.

Stéphanie Gicquel received the Micheline-Ostermeyer prize, awarded by the INSEP Alumni club and rewarding an athlete who has achieved a remarkable professional career during or after their sporting career. This prize was presented to her by André Giraud, president of the French Athletics Federation, in the presence of Stéphane Traineau, president of the INSEP Alumni club, and Anne Barrois-Chombart, deputy general director of INSEP, during an evening gala at the French National Olympic and Sports Committee, Wednesday November 9, 2022.

The Paris Olympic Committee awarded her the prize for Best Parisian Sportswoman in January 2023.

The documentary "La coureuse hors norme", a 23-minute portrait retracing the career of Stephanie Gicquel produced by the France TV teams, attracted nearly 4 million viewers during its first broadcast on France Television in the 8:30 p.m. summer show presented by Laurent Delahousse on August 27, 2023.

Aside from athletics, Stephanie Gicquel works as an author and speaker. Stéphanie Gicquel is the author of several books: On naît tous aventurier (Ramsay Edigroup, May 2018), Expedition Across Antarctica (Vilo Edigroup, preface by Nicolas Vanier, René Caillié prize for travel writing of the year 2016) and En mouvement (Ramsay, May 2021). She contributes to numerous books, including Mindset of Champions (2024) by Thierry Picq and Mickaël Romezy, Engagées (2021) by Charlotte Daubet, To succeed, strengthen your state of mind (2021) by Isabelle Proust alongside Thierry Marx and Mercedes Erra, Knowing to act - Towards another acceleration (2021) by Alexandra Corsi-Chopin, Little, I was already dreaming of it (2020) by Claire Le Meur, Les Pionnières (2020). She also writes a column in the sports magazine PANARD.

She regularly speaks in schools, businesses and in the media on climate change, audacity, the ability to adapt and surpassing oneself, individual and collective performance: “The only limit to our goals is the one we set ». She raised 10,000 euros for the Petits Princes association which makes the dreams of sick children come true. During her raid in Antarctica, she made a documentary Across Antarctica produced in 2016 on her adventure and the quest for meaning.

In 2023, she became an ambassador for Move For Muco, a running challenge organized each year by the association Vaincre La Mucoviscidose to fight cystic fibrosis which brought together 2,378 participants and raised more than 140,000 euros in donations in 2023 and more than 2,500 participants for more than 170,000 euros in donations in 2024.
