= Monica Casiraghi =

Italian ultrarunner

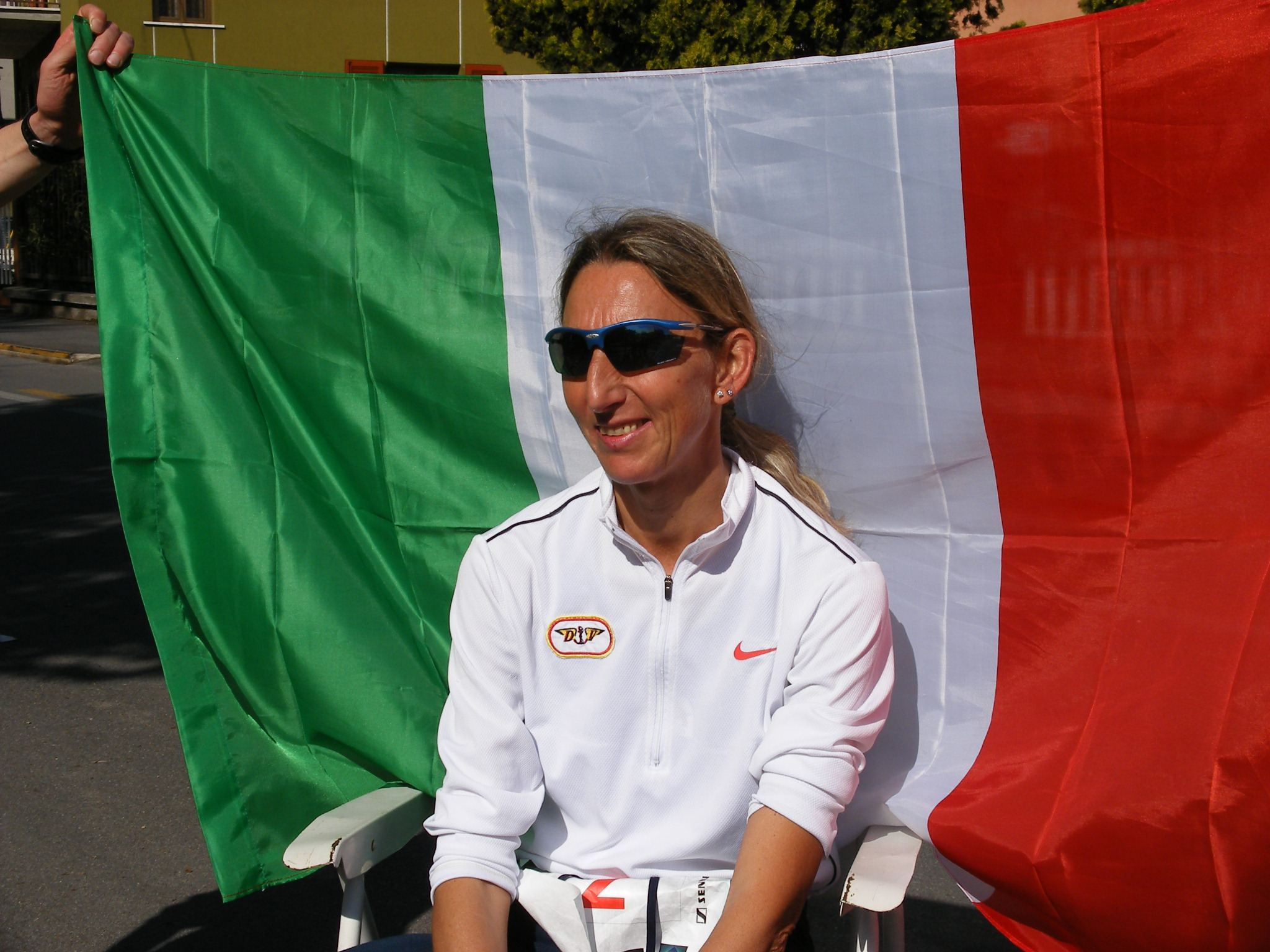
Monica Casiraghi

Monica Casiraghi is an Italian ultrarunner from Missaglia, who won the IAU 100 km World Championships in 2003 after finishing third in 2001 and 2002. She is also the Italian world record holder for a 24-hour race, during which she covered 231 km in the 2010 World Championships in Brive, France. She ran her first ultramarathon in 1997. In 2006 and 2007 she was European Champion for the 100 km races. She won the silver medal in the European Championship in 2009 and the bronze medal the following year. In 2010, she won the silver medal at the World Championship (100 km). In 2011, she won the Lago di Como ultratrail.
