= Records and statistics of the Comrades Marathon =

South African ultramarathon records

The Comrades Marathon's fastest recorded times are 5:13:58 for men (Tete Dijana, 2023 down run) and 5:44:54 for women (Gerda Steyn, 2023 down run). Steyn also holds the up-run record, becoming the first woman to break 6 hours with her 5:49:46 in 2024. The most gold medals earned in the women's race is 13 by Elena Nurgalieva, while Allan Robb leads the men's race with 12.

The race also highlights endurance over decades. Louis Massyn has completed 50 Comrades Marathons — the most in history. In 2023 Johannes Maros Mosehla became the oldest known finisher aged 81, a record he extended in 2024 and 2025. He beat the record held by Wally Hayward, who completed the race at age 80 in 1989, 58 years after his first win.

== 10 Fastest times (up & down runs) ==
10 Fastest Up Run Times – Men
Rank	Year	Athlete	Nation	Time	Position
1	2026	George Kusche	South Africa	5:15:56	1st
2	2026	Piet Wiersma	Netherlands	5:19:36	2nd
3	2026	Mbuti Mollo	South Africa	5:21:31	3rd
4	2026	Alex Milne	United Kingdom	5:22:29	4th
5	2026	Haruki Okayama	Japan	5:24:46	5th
6	2008	Leonid Shvetsov	Russia	5:24:49	1st
7	2024	Piet Wiersma	Netherlands	5:25:00	1st
8	2000	Vladimir Kotov	Belarus	5:25:33	1st
9	2024	Dan Moselakwe	South Africa	5:25:45	2nd
10	1998	Dmitri Grishin	Russia	5:26:25	1st

10 Fastest Up Run Times – Women
Rank	Year	Athlete	Nation	Time	Position
1	2026	Gerda Steyn	South Africa	5:44:53	1st
2	2024	Gerda Steyn	South Africa	5:49:46	1st
3	2026	Nobukhosi Tshuma	Zimbabwe	5:53:36	2nd
4	2019	Gerda Steyn	South Africa	5:58:53	1st
5	2026	Irvette van Zyl	South Africa	6:02:30	3rd
6	2024	Alexandra Morozova	Russia	6:05:12	2nd
7	2026	Shelmith Muriuki	Kenya	6:06:38	4th
8	2026	Naomi Robinson	United Kingdom	6:07:55	5th
9	2024	Courtney Olsen	(United States) USA	6:08:09	3rd
10	2006	Elena Nurgalieva	Russia	6:09:24	1st

10 Fastest Down Run Times – Men
Rank	Year	Athlete	Nation	Time	Position
1	2023	Tete Dijana	South Africa	5:13:58	1st
2	2023	Piet Wiersma	Netherlands	5:14:01	2nd
3	2023	Edward Mothibi	South Africa	5:17:34	3rd
4	2016	David Gatebe	South Africa	5:18:19	1st
5	2007	Leonid Shvetsov	Russia	5:20:41	1st
6	2009	Stephen Muzhingi	Zimbabwe	5:23:27	1st
7	2016	Ludwick Mamabolo	South Africa	5:24:05	2nd
8	1986	Bruce Fordyce	South Africa	5:24:07	1st
9	2025	Tete Dijana	South Africa	5:25:28	1st
10	2025	Piet Wiersma	Netherlands	5:25:33	2nd

10 Fastest Down Run Times – Women
Rank	Year	Athlete	Nation	Time	Position
1	2023	Gerda Steyn	South Africa	5:44:54	1st
2	2025	Gerda Steyn	South Africa	5:51:19	1st
3	1989	Frith van der Merwe	South Africa	5:54:43	1st
4	2025	Alexandra Morozova	(Authorised Neutral Athletes) Russia	5:55:56	2nd
5	2023	Adele Broodryk	South Africa	5:56:26	2nd
6	1997	Ann Trason	(United States) USA	5:58:25	1st
7	2005	Tatyana Zhirkova	Russia	5:58:51	1st
8	2023	Carla Molinaro	South Africa	6:00:23	3rd
9	1997	Maria Bak	Germany	6:00:28	2nd
10	2023	Dominika Stelmach	Poland	6:06:02	4th

== Multiple winners ==
'+' denotes winner of both an up and a down run

Men's champion	Wins	Club	Women's champion	Wins	Club
(South Africa) Bruce Fordyce +	9	Wits AC, Rand AC	(Russia) Elena Nurgalieva +	8	
(South Africa) (United Kingdom) Arthur Newton +	5		(South Africa) Gerda Steyn +	5	Nedbank RC, Phantane AC, Hollywood Bets AC
(South Africa) Hardy Ballington +	5		(South Africa) Maureen Holland +	4	
(South Africa) Wally Hayward +	5	Germiston Callies Harriers	(South Africa) Lettie van Zyl +	3	Germiston Callies Harriers
(South Africa) Jackie Mekler +	5	Germiston Callies Harriers	(New Zealand) (South Africa) Helen Lucre +	3	Hillcrest Villagers AC
(South Africa) Alan Robb +	4	Germiston Callies Harriers	(South Africa) Frith van der Merwe +	3	Benoni Northerns AC
(South Africa) Dave Bagshaw +	3	Savages AC	(Germany) Maria Bak +	3	Germany
(Zimbabwe) Stephen Muzhingi +	3		(Russia) Aleksandra Morozova	2	
(Belarus) (South Africa) Vladimir Kotov	3		(South Africa) (Republic of Ireland) Isavel Roche-Kelly +	2	UCT AC
(South Africa) Bongmusa Mthembu +	3		(South Africa) Elizabeth Cavanagh	2	Estcourt AC
(South Africa) Tete Dijana	3	Nedbank RC	(Russia) Olesya Nurgalieva	2	
(South Africa) Johnny Coleman	2		(United States) Ann Trason +	2	USA
(South Africa) Bill Cochrane +	2		(South Africa) Lindsay Weight +	2	UCT AC
(South Africa) Gerald Walsh +	2	Durban AC			
(South Africa) Trevor Allen +	2	Durban AC			
(South Africa) Derek Preiss	2	Westville AC			
(Russia) Dmitri Grishin	2				
(Russia) Leonid Shvetsov +	2				

== Most gold medals ==
Gold medals were first awarded in 1931, and to the first 6 male finishers. In 1972, this was extended to the first 10 male finishers, as it is today. In 1983 a gold medal was awarded to the female winner for the first time. In 1988, this was extended to the first 3 female finishers, then to the first 5 female finishers from 1995, and from 1998 onward to the first 10 female finishers, on par with the male race.

The following runners won 7 or more gold medals, gold medal span in brackets, clubs noted for local runners, race winners in bold:

Runners with 7 or More Comrades Gold Medals – Men
Athlete	Nation	Club (if local)	Gold Medals	Medal Span
**Alan Robb**	South Africa	Germiston Callies Harriers	12	1974–1991
**Bruce Fordyce**	South Africa	Wits University / Rand AC	11	1979–1990
**Bongmusa Mthembu**	South Africa	MAXED Elite KZN / Nedbank RC / Arthur Ford AC	11	2009–2025
**Trevor Allen**	South Africa	Durban AC	10	1950–1961
**Jackie Mekler**	South Africa	Germiston Callies Harriers	10	1952–1969
**Shaun Meiklejohn**	South Africa	Carlton Harriers / Collegians Harriers / MAXED Elite KZN	10	1989–1999
**Andrew Kelehe**	South Africa	Rentmeester Fattis and Monis / Liberty Nike AC	10	1997–2006
**Fusi Nhlapo**	South Africa	Liberty Nike AC / MAXED Elite CGA	10	2000–2012
Hoseah Tjale	South Africa	–	9	1980–1990
**Nick Bester**	South Africa	–	9	1988–1997
**Stephen Muzhingi**	Zimbabwe	–	9	2007–2015
Allen Boyce	South Africa	–	8	1936–1956
Gordon Baker	South Africa	–	8	1967–1974
**Hardy Ballington**	South Africa	–	7	1932–1947
Gerald Walsh	South Africa	–	7	1952–1960
**Charl Mattheus**	South Africa	–	7	1988–1998
**Oleg Kharitonov**	Russia	–	7	2002–2008
**Vladimir Kotov**	(South Africa) / Belarus	–	7	2000–2008
Mncedisi Mkhize	South Africa	–	7	2006–2016
Claude Moshiywa	South Africa	–	7	2005–2016
Ludwick Mamabolo	South Africa	–	7	2010–2017
**Gift Kelehe**	South Africa	–	7	2011–2023

Runners with 7 or More Comrades Gold Medals – Women
Athlete	Nation	Club (if local)	Gold Medals	Medal Span
**Elena Nurgalieva**	Russia	–	13	2003–2015
Marina Zhalybina	Russia	–	12	1999–2013
**Maria Bak**	Germany	–	11	1995–2008
Farwa Mentoor	South Africa		10	2002–2011
**Olesya Nurgalieva**	Russia	–	10	2003–2015
Valentina Shatyayeva	Russia	–	9	1994–2002
Yolande Maclean	South Africa		9	2003–2022
Grace De Oliveira	South Africa		7	1999–2007
**Gerda Steyn**	South Africa		7	2017–2026
Alexandra Morozova	Russia		7	2017–2025

== Most top 10 finishes by women ==
The following women have finished in the top 10 of the women's race on 7 or more occasions in the race history. Given the top 10 women only received gold medals from 1998, the gold medals list doesn't fully reflect the history of the women's race as female contenders in the 1980s and early 90s were competing for fewer gold medals relative to the men.

Women with the Most Top 10 Finishes at the Comrades Marathon
Top 10 Finishes	Athlete	Nation	Club (if listed)	Years active
13	Elena Nurgalieva	Russia	–	2003–2015
12	Marina Zhalybina	Russia	–	1999–2013
11	Maria Bak	Germany	–	1995–2008
10	Farwa Mentoor	South Africa	Harmony AC / Bonitas AC	2002–2011
10	Olesya Nurgalieva	Russia	–	2003–2015
9	Tilda Tearle	South Africa	Savages AC	1986–1995
9	Valentina Shatyayeva	Russia	–	1994–2002
9	Yolande Maclean	South Africa	MAXED Elite CGA	2003–2022
8	Priscilla Carlisle	South Africa	Rand AC	1981–1989
8	Ralie Smit	South Africa	Pretoria Marathon Club	1980–1989
8	Hazel Hairs	South Africa	Jeppe Quondam AC	1983–1990
7	Sanet Beukes	South Africa	Westville AC	1992–1998
7	Grace De Oliveira	South Africa	MAXED Elite KZN	1999–2007
7	Gerda Steyn	South Africa	MAXED Elite KZN	2017–2026

== International (non-African) gold medallists ==
As the race is the pinnacle of the South African distance running calendar (with significant prize money), local elite athletes will target the event year-after-year, so there are fewer international gold medalists. World class international athletes may target the Comrades from time to time but not on a consistent basis like South African athletes. Achieving even a single gold medal for an international athlete is a significant achievement overcoming local athletes in their premier event. The following non-African international runners have won 2 or more gold medals (winners in bold):

International (Non-African) Runners with 2+ Gold Medals – Men
Athlete	Nation	Gold Medals	Medal Span
**Oleg Kharitonov**	Russia	7	2002–2008
**Vladimir Kotov***	Belarus	7	2000–2008
Alexi Volgin	Russia	6	1995–2001
**Jaroslaw Janicki**	Poland	5	1997–2008
Grigory Murzin	Russia	5	1999–2008
**Leonid Schvetsov**	Russia	5	2001–2012
**Dmitri Grishin**	Russia	4	1996–2001
**Piet Wiersma**	Netherlands	4	2023–2026
Dave Levick	New Zealand	3	1971–1975
Jorge Aubeso	Spain	3	2002–2004
Jonas Buud	Sweden	3	2011–2014
Alex Milne	United Kingdom	3	2024–2026
**Mick Orton**	United Kingdom	2	1972–1973
John McBrearty	New Zealand	2	1973–1975
**Charly Doll**	Germany	2	1993–1994
Peter Camenzind	Switzerland	2	1994–1997
Konstantin Santalov	Russia	2	1997–1999
Mikhail Kokorev	Russia	2	1996–2000
Anatoliy Korepanov	Russia	2	1999–2000
Don Wallace	Australia	2	2000–2002
Steve Way	(United Kingdom) / England	2	2017–2018

- - Kotov subsequently naturalised as a South African citizen

International (Non-African) Runners with 2+ Gold Medals – Women
Athlete	Nation	Gold Medals	Medal Span
**Elena Nurgalieva**	Russia	13	2003–2015
Marina Zhalybina	Russia	12	1999–2013
**Maria Bak**	Germany	11	1995–2008
**Olesya Nurgalieva**	Russia	10	2003–2015
Valentina Shatyayeva	Russia	9	1994–2002
**Alexandra Morozova**	Russia	7	2017–2025
**Tatiana Zhirkova**	Russia	6	2003–2009
Marina Myshlyanova	Russia	6	2005–2010
**Elvira Kolpakova**	Russia	5	2000–2005
Dominika Stelmach	Poland	5	2019–2025
**Valentina Liakhova**	Russia	4	1994–1998
**Ellie Greenwood**	(United Kingdom) / Canada	4	2011–2015
Caitriona Jennings	(Republic of Ireland) Ireland	4	2019–2025
Joasia Zakrzewski	(United Kingdom) / Scotland	3	2012–2015
Devon Yanko	(United States) USA	3	2012–2018
Sarah Bard	(United States) USA	3	2016–2018
Courtney Olsen	(United States) USA	3	2024–2026
**Ann Trason**	(United States) USA	2	1996–1997
Birgit Lennartz	Germany	2	1999–2000
Maria Venancio	Brazil	2	1999–2001
Alena Vinitskaya	Russia	2	2003–2007
Kami Semick	(United States) USA	2	2010–2011
Lizzy Hawker	(United Kingdom) / Switzerland	2	2010–2011
Natalia Volgina	Russia	2	2002–2012
Simona Staicu	Hungary	2	2003–2015
**Camille Herron**	(United States) USA	2	2017–2022

== Most Wally Hayward medals ==
Wally Hayward BEM is a legendary figure in the history of the Comrades Marathon, winning the race on 5 occasions, the first at the age of 21 in 1930 and a further 4 times from 1950 to 1954 (with a break in 1952). Wally Hayward would likely have won the Comrades Marathon on more occasions had he not been advised by his doctor in 1931 to give up running (which he did for a while) as well as the hiatus due to WW2.

Between his Comrades wins he would represent South Africa at the 1938 Empire Games (finishing 4th over 3 miles and winning the bronze medal over 6 miles) and the 1952 Summer Olympics (finishing 10th in the marathon behind race-winner Emil Zatopek). He was also awarded the British Empire Medal for brave actions during WW2 in North Africa at El Alamein. In 1953 he would also set a new course record for the London to Brighton Marathon as well as world track records for 50 miles, 100 miles and 24 hours. He was then abruptly banned from amateur running from 1955 (until 1974) for accepting a small donation to cover travel expenses and so was deemed a professional athlete which ended his participation in the Comrades Marathon.

In 1988 he would come out of running retirement to complete the race again, finishing in a time of 9h44m to beat more than half of the field. The following year, 1989, he would famously finish one final time in 10h58, just 1m57s to the final race cut-off, to also become the oldest finisher (at the time), at the age of 80, an emotional finish that brought spectators to tears, standing in their seats cheering his name, willing him to the finish inside the final gun. His 1989 finish, physically in distress but persevering to the end despite a bleeding ulcer and advancing years, would capture the spirit of the nation at a time of great tension, a parallel reflecting the changes happening in South African society at that time. Just hours before the emotional scenes of Hayward's finish, history had already been witnessed as Samuel Tshabalala had become the first black athlete to win the Comrades Marathon, but it was Hayward's final Comrades finish that would steal the show, even receiving a congratulatory message from the State President FW de Klerk, as the great finale that would secure his status in running folklore as the personification of the grit, unity and resilience of South Africa.

The running community mourned his passing in 2006 at the age of 97 and the Wally Hayward Medal would be established at the Comrades Marathon the following year.

Running with his permanent green number 2, he has 7 medals to his tally (from 7 starts): 1 silver (for his 1930 victory, as gold medals were first introduced in 1931), 4 golds (for his victories in 1950-1 and 1953-54) and 2 bronzes (1988 & 1989). He holds the record for the youngest ever race winner (aged 21 in 1930) and also the, then, oldest winner when he won in 1954, aged 45 (a record only eclipsed by Vladimir Kotov in 2004). The silver-gold design of the Wally Hayward Medal is therefore an appropriate way to honour his iconic legacy as he won the race in both the silver medal and gold medal eras (before and after 1931), a testament to his longevity. He was the first Comrades Marathon winner to run under 6-hours when he won the race for the 4th time in 1953, hence the cut-off time for his namesake medal.

The following have won 3 or more Wally Hayward medals (for running sub-6 hours, but outside the top 10) since the medal was first awarded in 2007.

The number awarded is entirely dependent on the race speed so, in some years, fewer Wally Hayward medals may be awarded than golds.

Athletes with 3 or More Wally Hayward Medals (since 2007)
Athlete	Nation	Medals	Medal Span
Mike Fokoroni	Zimbabwe	5	2012–2023
Teboho Sello	Lesotho	5	2012–2026
Charles Tjiane	South Africa	5	2012–2026
Malusi Dlomo	South Africa	5	2016–2026
Prodigal Khumalo	South Africa	4	2010–2023
Peter Muthubi	South Africa	4	2009–2026
Mahlomola Sekhonyana	South Africa	4	2017–2026
Sanele Sibisi	South Africa	4	2022–2026
Harmans Mokgadi	South Africa	3	2012–2016
Bongmusa Mthembu	South Africa	3	2011–2026
Thabo Nkuna	South Africa	3	2014–2017
Charles Dibate Tjiane	South Africa	3	2012–2018
Renier Grobler	South Africa	3	2016–2024
Nkosinathi Duma	South Africa	3	2017–2026
Gordon Lesetedi	South Africa	3	2016–2026
Wayne Spies	Australia	3	2023–2026
Sithembiso Mqhele	South Africa	3	2024–2026
Ntsindiso Mphakathi	South Africa	3	2024–2026

== Most Isavel Roche-Kelly medals ==
Roche-Kelly was the first female athlete to break 7h30m when, aged 20, she won the 1980 down run in a time of 7h18m. She improved the women's record by over an hour, and becoming the first female runner to qualify for a silver medal as a result. She had only taken up the sport 11 months earlier with a short 500m jog around the university residence in Cape Town but progressed rapidly. In the following year's up run, in 1981, she became the first female to break the 7-hour barrier winning in 6h44m, improving the up run record by nearly 2 hours. She only competed in the Comrades Marathon on these two occasions as a student but her results immediately made her part of ultra-marathon folklore.

She grew up in Welkom in the Free State where her family had immigrated to from Ireland (her father was a doctor in the mines). After finishing school at Welkom High she went to the University of Cape Town to further her studies and there she took up running and would achieve her trail-blazing 1980 and 1981 Comrades Marathon results running for UCT AC. Although South Africa was banned from international sport, as she held dual Irish and South African nationality, she set her ambition of going to the Summer Olympics representing Ireland. Her lifetime marathon best, a South African national record of 2h42m27s, achieved on the hilly course of the 1981 Winelands Marathon, made her only the third African runner to break the 3-hour barrier and was comfortably within the 2h45m benchmark used by Olympic selectors in that era. She won a sporting scholarship to study in the US, but nagging back injuries ended her running ambitions. She returned to South Africa in 1983, which led her to transition to competitive cycling. There she quickly reached elite level, including winning the Cape Town Cycle Tour in 1984 in a new record time for a unique sporting double (next to her two Comrades wins). However, she later passed away in a cycling accident in Dublin in the same year at the age of just 24, without ever making an Olympic team.

The following have won 4 or more Isavel Roche-Kelly medals, the women's equivalent of the Wally Hayward Medal, for women running sub-7 hours, but outside the top 10 since the medal was first awarded in 2019.

Athletes with 4 or More Isavel Roche-Kelly Medals (since 2019)
Athlete	Nation	Medals	Medal Span
Maretha Smit	South Africa	5	2022–2026
Renata Vosloo	South Africa	4	2019-2024
Jeannie Henderson	South Africa	4	2022–2026

From 2019 to 2023 the medal was for a sub-7.30 finish but reduced to sub-7 hours from 2024. As the Comrades didn't take place during 2020 or 2021, only 3 races took place with the original (less onerous) medal criteria. For this table 4 medals has therefore been used as the cut-off as recipients would have at least one sub-7 Comrades to their name (like Roche-Kelly herself).

== Oldest finisher ==
- Marosi Johannes Mosehla became the oldest finisher in Comrades Marathon history in 2023, when he completed the race at the age of 81 in 9:26:09. He extended his own record in each of the next three editions, finishing the 2024 race aged 82 in 10:13:46, the 2025 race aged 83 in 11:47:27, and the 2026 race aged 84 in 11:12:27.
- Wally Hayward – 1989, 80 years. In 1954, winning Comrades for the fifth time, Hayward also was the oldest runner on the day, at the age of 45.

== Permanent green numbers ==
When a runner completes their 10th Comrades (or achieves either 5 gold medals or 3 wins) they attain their green number and keep their race number for life, the race number effectively being 'retired' only for use by that athlete. The first time a number is awarded it will be flanked by single laurels. After 20 years a double green number with double laurels is earned, followed by another laurel every next 10 years. A 3-time winner or 5 gold qualifier will not get a second green until they reach 20. The race number may subsequently only be inherited by family members.

The following are holders (either earned or inherited) of race numbers 1 to 10:

Top Comrades Marathon Multi-Medal Recipients
Rank	Name	Medals (Total)	Years active	Breakdown
((((1))))	Clive Crawley	42	1957–2000	1, 22, 19
(2)	Wally Hayward	7 (5 wins)	1930–1989	4, 1, 2
(2)	Steven Bure	9	2015–2026	1, 5 Bill Rowan, 3 Robert Mtshali
(3)	Allen Bodill	10	1947–1968	10
(3)	Myles Bodill	2	1989–1994	2
((4))	Nick Raubenheimer	22	1953–1975	6, 13, 3
((4))	Graham Raubenheimer	11	1980–1995	4, 6
((4))	Blake Raubenheimer	10	2005–2017	9, 1 Bill Rowan
(((5)))	Allan Ferguson	36	1948–1995	3, 12, 21
(6)	John Woods	11	1952–1979	1, 8, 2
(7)	Malcolm Hean	14	1962–1976	9, 5
8	Unknown (various)	–	1922–1995	Medal number '8' was used by multiple runners, including 'Boyle' (1922) and 'Natasha Williams' (1995)
(9)	Jackie Mekler	12 (5 wins)	1952–1985	10, 1, 1
(10)	Fred Morrison	11	1938–1966	2, 9

== Most medals – Green number records ==
=== Male quintuple green numbers ===
Medal holder	Medals	Number	Medal years	Medal categories	Clubs
(South Africa) Louis Massyn	50	(((((403)))))	1973–2025	10, 30, 10 Vic Clapham	Goudveld Multisport, Outeniqua Harriers

=== Male quadruple green numbers ===
Medal holder	Medals	Number	Medal years	Medal categories	Clubs
(South Africa) Barry Holland	49	((((916))))	1973–2023	22, 20, 6 Bill Rowan, 1 Vic Clapham	Savages AC, Jeppe Quondam AC, Dolphin Coast Striders
(South Africa) Wietsche van der Westhuizen	47	((((4192))))	1978-2026	6, 25, 8 Bill Rowan, 9 Vic Clapham	Asics Running Club, Bellville AC, Krugersdorp Road Runners, Macarthur Marathon Club
(South Africa) Dave Rogers	45	((((183))))	1961–2013	3, 26, 13, 3 Vic Clapham	Durban AC, Westville AC
(South Africa) Vic Boston	44	((((3111))))	1977–2022	17, 14, 11 Bill Rowan, 1 Vic Clapham, 1 u	Rocky Road Runners
(South Africa) Alan Robb	43	((((1704))))	1974–2022	12, 16, 6, 9 Bill Rowan	Germiston Callies Harriers, Rocky Road Runners
(South Africa) Mike Cowling	43	((((7296))))	1975-2023	14, 16, 12 Bill Rowan, 1 Vic Clapham	Hilton Harriers, Saints AC, Sparten AC, Collegians Harriers
(South Africa) Colin Goosen	44	((((144))))	1980–2026	24, 6, 8 Bill Rowan, 3 Robert Mtshali, 2 Vic Clapham	Save Orion AC, Saints AC, Collegian Harriers, Rocky Road Runners, PE Amateur AC, Uni of Natal PMB
(South Africa) Clive Crawley	42	((((1))))	1957–2000	1, 22, 19	Savages AC
(South Africa) Zwelitsha Gono	42	((((1180))))	1973-2019	14, 21, 1 Bill Rowan, 6 Vic Clapham	South Coast Striders
(South Africa) Dave Lowe	42	((((1702))))	1974–2015	3, 35, 3 Bill Rowan, 1 Vic Clapham	Savages AC, Westville AC
(South Africa) David Williams	42	((((1550))))	1973-2022	1, 32, 9 Vic Clapham	Savages AC
(South Africa) Tommy Neitski	41	((((1689))))	1977-2018	3, 33, 5 Vic Clapham	Sunshine AC
(South Africa) Riel Hugo	40	((((1221))))	1969–2008	21, 14, 2 Bill Rowan, 3 Vic Clapham	Durbanville AC, Whalers AC, Tygervallei Belville AC, Germiston Callies Harriers
(South Africa) Boysie van Staden	40	((((2516))))	1973–2017	6, 7, 11, 7 Bill Rowan, 2 Vic Clapham	DHS Old Boys, Savages AC, Berea Rovers AC, Maxed Elite KZN, Durban AC, PDAC, YPAC
(South Africa) Shaun Wood	40	((((4286))))	1978–2017	14, 29, 1 Bill Rowan, 3 Vic Clapham	Westville AC, YPAC, Collegians Harriers
(South Africa) Johann van Eeden	40	((((1691))))	1974–2018	35, 5 Vic Clapham	Akasia AC, Ndaba AC, Pretoria MC

No female runner has achieved a quadruple green number yet.

=== Female triple green numbers ===
Medal holder	Medals	Number	Medal years	Medal categories	Clubs
(South Africa) Kleintjie van Schalkwyk	37	(((7919)))	1983–2026	7 Bill Rowan, 26, 4 Vic Clapham	Secunda Marathon Klub, Mossel Bay Harriers, Hartenbos Drawwers
(South Africa) Patricia Fisher	34	(((1011)))	1987–2024	19, 15 Vic Clapham	Stella AC
(South Africa) Kim Pain	32	(((5938)))	1988–2025	20, 7 Bill Rowan, 5 Vic Clapham	Jeppe Quondam AC
(South Africa) Toni Hesp	33	(((5974)))	1985–2026	28, 4 Vic Clapham	Jeppe AC, Rocky Road Runners
(South Africa) Pat Freeman	31	(((6883)))	1989–2022	24, 7 Vic Clapham	Stella AC, Dolphin Coast Striders
(South Africa) Tilda Tearle	30	(((5701)))	1984–2017	3, 7, 1 Bill Rowan, 13, 6 Vic Clapham	Savages AC

=== International triple/double green numbers ===
International Runners with 20 or More Comrades Medals
ID	Athlete	Nation	Medals	Years active
(((8612)))	John Sneddon	Scotland	32	1993–2026
(((8272)))	Klaus Neumann	Germany	30	1993–2026
((48663))	Tiago Dionisio	Portugal	24	2001–2026
((9436))	Hideo Takano	Japan	23	1999–2026
((48418))	Nato Amaral	Brazil	21	2004-2026
((54110))	David Miles	United Kingdom	20	2004-2026
((378))	Bruce Matthews	New Zealand	20	1967–2001

== Most consecutive medals ==
Medal holder	Medals	Achieved in
(South Africa) Barry Holland	49	2023
(South Africa) Louis Massyn	47	2019
(South Africa) Wietsche van der Westhuizen	47	2026
(South Africa) Vic Boston	44	2022
(South Africa) Alan Robb	42	2015
(South Africa) Dave Lowe	42	2015
(South Africa) Tommy Neitski	41	2017
(South Africa) Kenny Craig	40	1998
(South Africa) Riel Hugo	40	2008
(South Africa) Shaun Wood	40	2017

== See also ==
- List of winners of the Comrades Marathon
- History of the Comrades Marathon
