= List of winners of the Comrades Marathon =

The Comrades Marathon results show over a century of competitive endurance running. Bill Rowan won the first race in 1921 in 8:59:00, and Arthur Newton dominated the 1920s with five wins. Wally Hayward and Bruce Fordyce became major figures, with Hayward winning five times across the 1930s to 1950s, and Fordyce winning nine times in the 1980s. The women's race, officially recognised from 1975, saw standout performances like Frith van der Merwe’s 5:54:43 in 1989, a record that stood for decades. In the 2000s, Russian athletes Elena and Olesya Nurgalieva were dominant, winning most of the women's races between 2003 and 2015.

From 2014 onwards, South African athletes began winning more consistently. Bongmusa Mthembu won three titles, and David Gatebe set the men’s down run record of 5:18:19 in 2016. Gerda Steyn has become the leading figure in the women’s field, breaking the down run record in 2023 (5:44:54) and the up run record in 2024 (5:49:46). On the men’s side, Tete Dijana broke the down run record on his way to his second victory in 2023, while Dutch runner Piet Wiersma won in 2024 and finished second in 2023. Since the end of COVID-related cancellations in 2020 and 2021, the race has returned with faster times and stronger fields, both local and international.

To date, Bruce Fordyce holds the record for the most men's victories with nine wins, while Elena Nurgalieva leads the women's field with eight wins.

== Race Winners ==
Key: Current course record

Past Comrades winners
Year	u/d	Time (Men)	Men's Champion	Club	Time (Women)	Women's Champion	Club	Notes
2026	u	5:15:56	(South Africa) George Kusche	Nedbank RC	5:44:53	(South Africa) Gerda Steyn^{5}	Hollywood Bets RC	
2025	d	5:25:28	(South Africa) Tete Dijana^{3}	Nedbank RC	5:51.19	(South Africa) Gerda Steyn^{4}	Hollywood Bets RC	
2024	u	5:25:00	(Netherlands) Piet Wiersma	Nedbank RC	5:49.46	(South Africa) Gerda Steyn^{3}	Phantane AC	
2023	d	5:13:58	(South Africa) Tete Dijana^{2}	Nedbank RC	5:44.54	(South Africa) Gerda Steyn^{2}	Phantane AC	
2022	d	5:30:38	(South Africa) Tete Dijana	Nedbank RC GN	6:17:48	(Russia) Alexandra Morozova	International	
—	cancelled in 2020 and 2021 due to coronavirus pandemic							
2019	u	5:31:33	(South Africa) Edward Mothibi	Nedbank RC GN	5:58:53	(South Africa) Gerda Steyn	Nedbank RC JHB	
2018	d	5:26:34	(South Africa) Bongmusa Mthembu^{3}	Arthur Ford AC	6:10:03	(South Africa) Ann Ashworth	Massmart AC CG	
2017	u	5:35:34	(South Africa) Bongmusa Mthembu^{2}	Arthur Ford AC	6:27:35	(United States) Camille Herron	Nedbank RC International	
2016	d	5:18:19	(South Africa) David Gatebe	TomTom AC	6:25:55	(South Africa) Charné Bosman	Nedbank RC CG	
2015	u	5:38:36	(South Africa) Gift Kelehe	Samancor Chrome MC	6:12:22	(South Africa) Caroline Wöstmann	Nedbank RC	
2014	d	5:28:29	(South Africa) Bongmusa Mthembu	Nedbank RC KZN	6:18:12	(United Kingdom) Eleanor Greenwood	Nedbank International	
2013	u	5:32:09	(South Africa) Claude Moshiywa	Nedbank RC GN	6:27:09	(Russia) Elena Nurgalieva^{8}	Maxed Elite International	
2012	d	5:31:03	(South Africa) Ludwick Mamabolo	Maxed Elite KZN	6:07:12	(Russia) Elena Nurgalieva^{7}	Maxed Elite International	
2011	u	5:32:45	(Zimbabwe) Stephen Muzhingi^{3}	Formula 1 Bluff Meats AC	6:24:11	(Russia) Elena Nurgalieva^{6}	Maxed Elite International	
2010	d	5:29:01	(Zimbabwe) Stephen Muzhingi^{2}	Formula 1 Bluff Meats AC	6:13:03	(Russia) Elena Nurgalieva^{5}	Maxed Elite International	
2009	d	5:23:27	(Zimbabwe) Stephen Muzhingi	Formula 1 Bluff Meats AC	6:12:08	(Russia) Olesya Nurgalieva^{2}	Maxed Elite International	
2008	u	5:24:49	(Russia) Leonid Shvetsov^{2}	Harmony International	6:14:38	(Russia) Elena Nurgalieva^{4}	Maxed Elite International	
2007	d	5:20:49	(Russia) Leonid Shvetsov	Harmony International	6:10:11	(Russia) Olesya Nurgalieva	Harmony International	
2006	u	5:35:19	(Russia) Oleg Kharitonov	Harmony International	6:09:24	(Russia) Elena Nurgalieva^{3}	Russia	
2005	d	5:27:10	(South Africa) Sipho Ngomane	Harmony AC MPL	5:58:50	(Russia) Tatyana Zhirkova	Russia	
2004	u	5:31:22	(Belarus) Vladimir Kotov^{3}	Maxed Elite PE	6:11:15	(Russia) Elena Nurgalieva^{2}	Premier AC	
2003	d	5:28:52	(South Africa) Fusi Nhlapo	Liberty Nike AC CG	6:07:46	(Russia) Elena Nurgalieva	Russia	
2002	u	5:30:59	(Belarus) Vladimir Kotov^{2}	Maxed Elite International	6:14:21	(Germany) Maria Bak^{3}	Germany	
2001	d	5:25:51	(South Africa) Andrew Kelehe	Rentmeester Fattis & Monis GN	6:13:53	(Russia) Elvira Kolpakova	Russia	
2000	u	5:25:33	(Belarus) Vladimir Kotov	Maxed Elite International	6:15:35	(Germany) Maria Bak^{2}	Germany	
1999	d	5:30:10	(Poland) Jaroslaw Janicki	Maxed Elite International	6:31:03	(Germany) Birgit Lennartz	Germany	
1998	u	5:26:25	(Russia) Dmitri Grishin^{2}	Rentmeester Fattis & Monis WP	6:38:57	(South Africa) Rae Bisschoff	Rocky Road Runners	
1997	d	5:28:37	(South Africa) Charl Mattheus	Rentmeester Fattis & Monis WP	5:58:24	(United States) Ann Trason^{2}	USA	
1996	u	5:29:33	(Russia) Dmitri Grishin	Rentmeester Fattis & Monis WP	6:13:23	(United States) Ann Trason	USA	
1995	d	5:34:02	(South Africa) Shaun Meiklejohn	Maxed Elite KZN	6:22:57	(Germany) Maria Bak	Germany	
1994	u	5:38:39	(United States) Alberto Salazar	USA	6:41:23	(Russia) Valentina Lyakhova	Comrades International	
1993	d	5:39:41	(Germany) Charly Doll	Germany	6:55:07	(South Africa) Tilda Tearle	Savages AC	
1992	u	5:46:11	(South Africa) Jetman Msutu (Note: The 1992 race was won by Charl Mattheus, who was later disqualified, testing positive for a banned stimulant found in cough syrup. Shortly thereafter the particular stimulant was removed from the list of banned substances, but Mattheus was never reinstated as winner.)	unknown	6:51:05	(South Africa) Frances van Blerk	Magnolia Road Runners	
1991	d	5:40:53	(South Africa) Nick Bester	Magnolia Road Runners	6:08:19	(South Africa) Frith van der Merwe^{3}	Benoni Northerns AC	
1990	u	5:40:25	(South Africa) Bruce Fordyce^{9}	Rand AC	7:02:00	(South Africa) Naidene Harrison	Ladysmith AC	
1989	d	5:35:51	(South Africa) Samuel Tshabalala	Spectrum Athletic Club	5:54:43	(South Africa) Frith van der Merwe^{2}	Benoni Northerns AC	
1988	u	5:27:42	(South Africa) Bruce Fordyce^{8}	Rand AC	6:32:56	(South Africa) Frith van der Merwe	Benoni Northerns AC	
1987	u	5:37:01	(South Africa) Bruce Fordyce^{7}	Rand AC	6:48:42	(New Zealand) (South Africa) Helen Lucre^{3}	Hillcrest Villagers AC	
1986	d	5:24:07	(South Africa) Bruce Fordyce^{6}	Rand AC	6:55:01	(New Zealand) (South Africa) Helen Lucre^{2}	Hillcrest Villagers AC	
1985	u	5:37:01	(South Africa) Bruce Fordyce^{5}	University of Witwatersrand	6:53:24	(New Zealand) (South Africa) Helen Lucre	Hillcrest Villagers AC	
1984	d	5:27:18	(South Africa) Bruce Fordyce^{4}	University of Witwatersrand	6:46:35	(South Africa) Lindsay Weight^{2}	University of Cape Town AC	
1983	u	5:30:12	(South Africa) Bruce Fordyce^{3}	University of Witwatersrand	7:12:56	(South Africa) Lindsay Weight	University of Cape Town AC	
1982	d	5:34:22	(South Africa) Bruce Fordyce^{2}	University of Witwatersrand	7:04:59	(South Africa) Cheryl Winn	Pirates Road Running	
1981	u	5:37:28	(South Africa) Bruce Fordyce	University of Witwatersrand	6:44:35	(South Africa) Isavel Roche-Kelly^{2}	University of Cape Town AC	
1980	d	5:38:25	(South Africa) Alan Robb^{4}	Germiston Callies Harriers	7:18:00	(South Africa) Isavel Roche-Kelly	University of Cape Town AC	
1979	u	5:45:02	(South Africa) Piet Vorster	Collegians Harriers	8:22:41	(South Africa) Jan Mallen	unknown	
1978	d	5:29:14	(South Africa) Alan Robb^{3}	Germiston Callies Harriers	8:25:	(South Africa) Lettie van Zyl^{3}	Germiston Callies Harriers	
1977	u	5:47:00	(South Africa) Alan Robb^{2}	Germiston Callies Harriers	8:58:	(South Africa) Lettie van Zyl^{2}	Germiston Callies Harriers	
1976	d	5:40:53	(South Africa) Alan Robb	Germiston Callies Harriers	9:05:	(South Africa) Lettie van Zyl	Germiston Callies Harriers	
1975	u	5:53:00	(South Africa) Derek Preiss^{2}	Westville AC	10:08:	(South Africa) Elizabeth Cavanagh^{2}	Estcourt AC	
1974	u	6:02:49	(South Africa) Derek Preiss	Westville AC	10:40:	(South Africa) Alet Kleynhans	Johannesburg Harriers AC	
1973	d	5:39:09	(South Africa) Dave Levick	University of Cape Town AC	8:40:	(South Africa) Maureen Holland^{4}	unknown	
1972	u	5:48:57	(United Kingdom) Mick Orton	Tipton Harriers	9:26:	(South Africa) Maureen Holland^{3}	unknown	
1971	d	5:47:06	(South Africa) Dave Bagshaw^{3}	Savages AC	8:37:	(South Africa) Maureen Holland^{2}	unknown	
1970	u	5:51:27	(South Africa) Dave Bagshaw^{2}	Savages AC	10:50:	(South Africa) Elizabeth Cavanagh	Estcourt AC	
1969	d	5:45:35	(South Africa) Dave Bagshaw	Savages AC				
1968	u	6:01:11	(South Africa) Jack Mekler^{5}	Germiston Callies Harriers				
1967	d	5:54:10	(South Africa) Manie Kuhn	Savages AC				
1966	u	6:14:07	(South Africa) Tommy Malone	Germiston Callies Harriers	9:30:00	(South Africa) Maureen Holland	unknown	
1965	d	5:51:09	(United Kingdom) Bernard Gomersall	unknown	10:07:	(South Africa) Mavis Hutchinson	Germiston Callies Harriers	
1964	u	6:09:54	(South Africa) Jack Mekler^{4}	Germiston Callies Harriers				
1963	d	5:51:20	(South Africa) Jack Mekler^{3}	Germiston Callies Harriers				
1962	u	5:57:05	(United Kingdom) John Smith	unknown				
1961	d	6:07:07	(South Africa) George Claassen	Germiston Callies Harriers				
1960	u	5:56:32	(South Africa) Jack Mekler^{2}	Germiston Callies Harriers				
1959	d	6:28:11	(South Africa) Trevor Allen^{2}	Durban AC				
1958	u	6:26:26	(South Africa) Jack Mekler	Germiston Callies Harriers				
1957	d	6:13:55	(South Africa) Mercer Davies	Germiston Callies Harriers				
1956	u	6:33:35	(South Africa) Gerald Walsh^{2}	Durban AC				
1955	d	6:06:32	(South Africa) Gerald Walsh	Durban AC				
1954	u	6:12:55	(South Africa) Wally Hayward^{5}	Germiston Callies Harriers				
1953	d	5:52:30	(South Africa) Wally Hayward^{4}	Germiston Callies Harriers				
1952	u	7:00:02	(South Africa) Trevor Allen	Durban AC				
1951	d	6:14:08	(South Africa) Wally Hayward^{3}	Germiston Callies Harriers				
1950	u	6:46:25	(South Africa) Wally Hayward^{2}	Germiston Callies Harriers				
1949	d	6:23:21	(South Africa) Reg Allison	unknown				
1948	u	7:13:52	(South Africa) William Savage^{2}	Durban AC				
1947	d	6:41:05	(South Africa) Hardy Ballington^{5}	unknown				
1946	u	7:02:40	(South Africa) Bill Cochrane^{2}	unknown				
—	not held from 1941 to 1945 due to World War II							
1940	u	6:39:23	(South Africa) Allen Boyce	Durban AC				
1939	d	6:22:05	(South Africa) Johnny Coleman^{2}	unknown				
1938	u	6:32:26	(South Africa) Hardy Ballington^{4}	unknown				
1937	d	6:23:11	(South Africa) Johnny Coleman	unknown				
1936	u	6:46:14	(South Africa) Hardy Ballington^{3}	unknown				
1935	d	6:30:05	(South Africa) Bill Cochrane	unknown				
1934	u	7:09:03	(South Africa) Hardy Ballington^{2}	unknown				
1933	d	6:50:37	(South Africa) Hardy Ballington	unknown	9:31:25	(South Africa) Geraldine Watson^{3}	unknown	
1932	u	7:41:58	(South Africa) William Savage	Germiston Callies Harriers	11:56:00	(South Africa) Geraldine Watson^{2}	unknown	
1931	d	7:16:30	(South Africa) Phil Masterton-Smith	Natal Carbineers AC	11 hrs +	(South Africa) Geraldine Watson	unknown	
1930	u	7:27:26	(South Africa) Wally Hayward	Germiston Callies Harriers				
1929	d	7:52:00	(South Africa) Darrell Dale	unknown				
1928	u	7:49:07	(South Africa) Frank Sutton	unknown				
1927	d	6:40:56	(South Africa) Arthur Newton^{5}	unknown				
1926	u	6:57:46	(South Africa) Harry Phillips	unknown				
1925	d	6:24:45	(South Africa) Arthur Newton^{4}	unknown				
1924	u	6:58:22	(South Africa) Arthur Newton^{3}	unknown				
1923	d	6:56:00	(South Africa) Arthur Newton^{2}	unknown	11:35:00	(South Africa) Frances Hayward	unknown	
1922	u	8:40:00	(South Africa) Arthur Newton	unknown				
1921	d	8:59:00	(South Africa) Bill Rowan	unknown				

== Multiple winners ==
'+' denotes winner of both an up and a down run

Men's champion	Wins	Club	Women's champion	Wins	Club
(South Africa) Bruce Fordyce +	9	Wits AC, Rand AC	(Russia) Elena Nurgalieva +	8	
(South Africa) (United Kingdom) Arthur Newton +	5		(South Africa) Gerda Steyn +	5	Nedbank RC, Phantane AC, Hollywood Bets RC
(South Africa) Hardy Ballington +	5		(South Africa) Maureen Holland +	4	
(South Africa) Wally Hayward +	5	Germiston Callies Harriers	(South Africa) Lettie van Zyl +	3	Germiston Callies Harriers
(South Africa) Jackie Mekler +	5	Germiston Callies Harriers	(New Zealand) (South Africa) Helen Lucre +	3	Hillcrest Villagers AC
(South Africa) Alan Robb +	4	Germiston Callies Harriers	(South Africa) Frith van der Merwe +	3	Benoni Northerns AC
(South Africa) Dave Bagshaw +	3	Savages AC	(Germany) Maria Bak +	3	Germany
(Zimbabwe) Stephen Muzhingi +	3		(South Africa) (Republic of Ireland) Isavel Roche-Kelly +	2	UCT AC
(Belarus) (South Africa) Vladimir Kotov	3		(South Africa) Elizabeth Cavanagh	2	Estcourt AC
(South Africa) Bongmusa Mthembu +	3		(Russia) Olesya Nurgalieva	2	
(South Africa) Tete Dijana	3	Nedbank RC	(United States) Ann Trason +	2	USA
(South Africa) Johnny Coleman	2		(South Africa) Lindsay Weight +	2	UCT AC
(South Africa) Bill Cochrane +	2				
(South Africa) Gerald Walsh +	2	Durban AC			
(South Africa) Trevor Allen +	2	Durban AC			
(South Africa) Derek Preiss	2	Westville AC			
(Russia) Dmitri Grishin	2				
(Russia) Leonid Shvetsov +	2				

== First South Africans ==
As the race has grown in profile globally, and since the end of sporting isolation, international runners have come to dominate the race for periods of time. As a result, the first South African home each year is also now awarded a separate prize.

The following have had the distinction of being the first male and female South African across the finish line (overall finishing position in brackets), in years where the winner was an international runner:

First South African Finishers in International Winner Years
Year	Athlete (Men)	Event	Club	Overall Position	Athlete (Women)	Event	Club	Overall Position
2024	Dan Moselakwe	Men's	Nedbank Running Club	2nd				
2022					Adele Broodryk	Women's	Murray & Roberts AC NW	3rd
2017					Charné Bosman	Women's	Nedbank Running Club GN	2nd
2014					Caroline Wostmann	Women's	Nedbank Running Club GN	6th
2013					Charné Bosman	Women's	Bonitas AC CG	5th
2012					Kerry Koen	Women's	Bonitas AC CG	4th
2011	Fanie Matshipa	Men's	Samcor Marathon Club PE	2nd	Farwa Mentoor	Women's	Bonitas AC CG	5th
2010	Ludwick Mamabolo	Men's	Maxed Elite CGA	2nd	Farwa Mentoor	Women's	Bonitas AC CG	5th
2009	Charles Tjiane	Men's	Maxed Elite CGA	3rd	Farwa Mentoor	Women's	Bonitas AC CG	5th
2008	Harmans Mokgadi	Men's	Nedbank Running Club GN	6th	Riana van Niekerk	Women's	Maxed Elite CGA	6th
2007	Mncedisi Mkhize	Men's	Maxed Elite CGA	3rd	Farwa Mentoor	Women's	Harmony AC GN	4th
2006	Brian Zondi	Men's	Harmony AC CG	2nd	Farwa Mentoor	Women's	Harmony AC GN	6th
2005					Farwa Mentoor	Women's	Harmony AC GN	4th
2004	Willie Mtolo	Men's	Harmony AC CG	4th	Farwa Mentoor	Women's	Harmony AC GN	3rd
2003					Farwa Mentoor	Women's	Harmony AC GN	8th
2002	Willie Mtolo	Men's	Harmony AC CG	2nd	Farwa Mentoor	Women's	Adidas AC	4th
2001					Deborah Mattheus	Women's	Harmony AC GW	2nd
2000	Donovan Wright	Men's	Maxed Elite PE	4th	Grace de Oliveira	Women's	Maxed Elite KZN	3rd
1999	Andrew Kelehe	Men's	Rentmeester Fattis & Monis WP	2nd	Grace de Oliveira	Women's	Maxed Elite KZN	2nd
1998	Charl Mattheus	Men's	Rentmeester Fattis & Monis WP	2nd				
1997					Charlotte Noble	Women's	club unknown	5th
1996	Nick Bester	Men's	Tuks Road Runners Club	2nd	Jowaine Parrott	Women's	Tygervalley Bellville AC	4th
1995					Helene Joubert	Women's	Agape AC GN	2nd
1994	Nick Bester	Men's	Tuks Road Runners Club	2nd	Sanet Beukes	Women's	Westville AC	4th
1993	Theo Rafiri	Men's	club unknown	2nd				
1972	Dave Bagshaw	Men's	Savages AC	2nd				
1965	Jackie Mekler	Men's	Germiston Callies Harriers	2nd				
1962	Jackie Mekler	Men's	Germiston Callies Harriers	2nd				

== See also ==
- History of the Comrades Marathon
- Records and Statistics of the Comrades Marathon
