= 2025 Comrades Marathon =

Ultramarathon in South Africa

98th Comrades Marathon
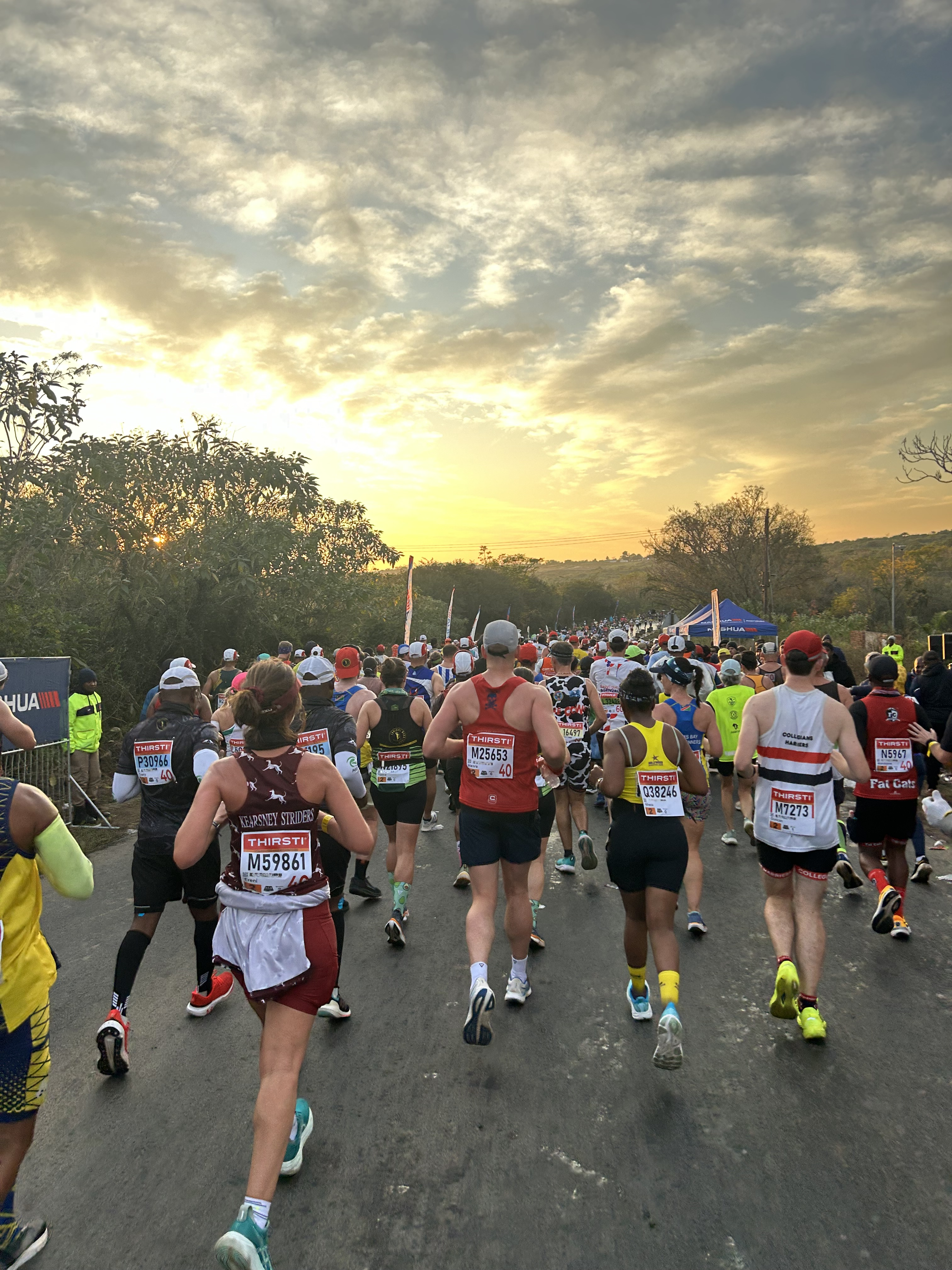
- Runners about an hour after the 2025 Comrades Marathon's Group 2 start, roughly 10km from the start in Pietermaritzburg.
- Location: KwaZulu-Natal, South Africa.
- Dates: 8 June 2025 (12 months ago)
- Website: www.comrades.com

Champions
- Men: Tete Dijana (5:25:28)
- Women: Gerda Steyn (5:51:19)

The 2025 Comrades Marathon was the 98th edition of the ultramarathon, taking place on June 8, 2025. The race was a "down" run, starting in Pietermaritzburg and finishing in Durban, covering 89.98 kilometers. The race featured a street finish in Durban and, for the first time, a two-batch start. Both groups had 12 hours to complete the race.

== Pre-Race ==
=== Pre-Race Favourites ===
The men’s race was expected to be tightly contested. Defending up run champion Piet Wiersma of the Netherlands returned after back-to-back podium finishes, including a second-place result in the previous down run. His chief rival was likely to be Tete Dijana, the winner of the 2023 and 2022 down runs, who aimed to reclaim his title. 2024 runner-up Dan Moselakwe was another strong contender, known for his remarkable comeback to elite competition after personal challenges. South African veteran Joseph Manyedi, who previously clocked a personal best of 5:28:33 in 2024 to finish fourth, entered his ninth Comrades with four gold medals to his name. Former champion Edward Mothibi (2019) rounded out a strong field.

The women’s race presented a contrasting dynamic, with Gerda Steyn entering as the clear front-runner. Steyn, a three-time winner and record-holder on both the up and down routes, was widely expected to add a fourth title to her name. Her dominance in South Africa’s major ultra-distance events left her without a close rival heading into the 2025 edition.

=== Race logistics and participation ===
The race had 22,670 qualified entrants, with approximately 20,000 expected to line up at the start, making it potentially the largest 'down' run in Comrades history. Over 80 countries were represented, including 3,064 international runners. A revised two-wave start sent off elite and seeded athletes first, followed by a second group of around 10,000 runners, each subdivided into smaller batches 15 minutes later. Along the route, over 5,000 volunteers staffed refreshment stations stocked with 2.2 million water sachets, 600,000 sports drink sachets, 40,000 litres of soft drinks, and several tons of fruit, potatoes, and snacks to support competitors throughout the day.

The average age of the field was 44.5. The oldest entrant was 83-year-old Johannes Maros Mosehla, who aimed to break his own record as the oldest Comrades Marathon finisher. Mosehla first ran the race at 63 and had since completed ten editions. He was joined by fellow octogenarian Matule Headbush (80). Louis Massyn was targeting to become the first person to achieve 50 Comrades medals.

== Race Overview ==
=== Men's ===
Tete Dijana won the 2025 Comrades Marathon men’s race in one of the closest finishes in the event’s recent history, completing the down run from Pietermaritzburg to Durban in 5:25:28. He finished five seconds ahead of defending champion Piet Wiersma, with whom he had run closely for most of the 89.98km course. The two athletes had previously shared the podium in the 2023 down run when Dijana won his second Comrades and Wiersma had come second. Wiersma had also won the 2024 up run. Their performance marked another chapter in what has become a developing rivalry at the top of the men’s field.

Third place went to Nikolai Volkov of Russia, competing under Authorised Neutral Athlete status, who finished in 5:29:42. Former champion Edward Mothibi placed fourth, followed by Joseph Manyedi. South African veterans, and former champions, Bongmusa Mthembu and David Gatebe also placed in the top ten. The race was contested under warm and humid conditions, with large crowds in attendance along the route and at the finish near Moses Mabhida Stadium.

=== Women's ===
Gerda Steyn won her fourth title, completing the 89.98 km down run in 5:51:19. The course was approximately two kilometres longer than the previous down run in 2023 due to the finish being moved to People’s Park outside Moses Mabhida Stadium, which is undergoing renovations. Despite showing visible signs of fatigue in the final kilometres, Steyn maintained her lead to secure the victory. The result added to her previous wins in 2019, 2023, and 2024, cementing her status as one of the most successful athletes in the history of the event.

Second place went to Aleksandra Morozova, competing under Authorised Neutral Athlete status, who finished in 5:55:56 after briefly walking due to cramp shortly after the halfway point. Shelmith Muriuki of Kenya claimed third in 6:07:56. She was followed by Irvette van Zyl in fourth and Dominika Stelmach of Poland in fifth. Zambian runner Elizabeth Mukoloma led for much of the first half before being overtaken by Steyn near the Valley of a Thousand Hills. While Morozova threatened to close the gap late in the race, Steyn held off the challenge to continue her dominant run in South African ultra-distance events.

=== General Field ===
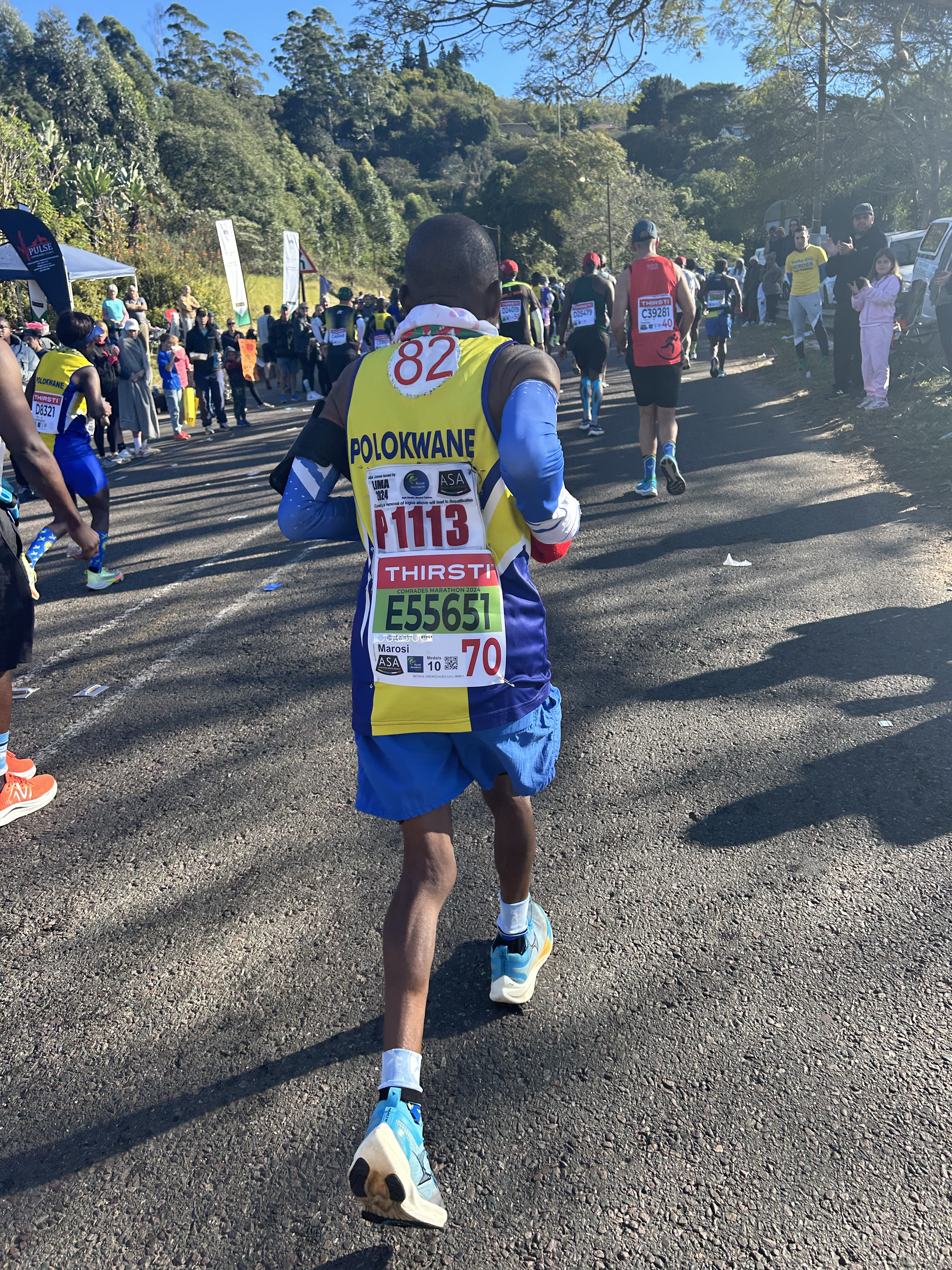
Johannes Maros Mosehla running in the 2024 Comrades Marathon.

18,208 runners completed the race. Of the finishers 14,646 were men and 3,562 were women.

Louis Massyn completed his 50th Comrades, finishing in a time of 11:53:14. Johannes Mosehla (83) extended his record of being the oldest person to complete the race, finishing in a time of 11:47:27.

== Top 10 Results ==
=== Men ===
Position	Name	Country	Time
1st place, gold medalist(s)	Tete Dijana	South Africa	5:25:28
2nd place, silver medalist(s)	Piet Wiersma	Netherlands	5:25:33
3rd place, bronze medalist(s)	Nikolai Volkov	Authorised Neutral Athletes	5:29:42
4	Edward Mothibi	South Africa	5:31:41
5	Joseph Manyedi	South Africa	5:32:09
6	Alex Milne	United Kingdom	5:34:08
7	David Gatebe	South Africa	5:34:08
8	Bongmusa Mthembu	South Africa	5:35:48
9	Gordon Lesetedi	South Africa	5:36:22
10	Vasili Korytkin	Authorised Neutral Athletes	5:38:59

=== Women ===
Position	Name	Country	Time
1st place, gold medalist(s)	Gerda Steyn	South Africa	5:51:19
2nd place, silver medalist(s)	Alexandra Morozova	Authorised Neutral Athletes	5:55:56
3rd place, bronze medalist(s)	Shelmith Muriuki	Kenya	6:07:56
4	Irvette van Zyl	South Africa	6:11:35
5	Dominika Stelmach	Poland	6:12:02
6	Carla Molinaro	United Kingdom	6:13:03
7	Jenet Mbhele	South Africa	6:14:24
8	Caitriona Jennings	Ireland	6:16:42
9	Courtney Olsen	United States	6:17:48
10	Melissah Gibson	United Kingdom	6:19:59
