= 2026 Comrades Marathon =

Road running event in South Africa

99th Comrades Marathon
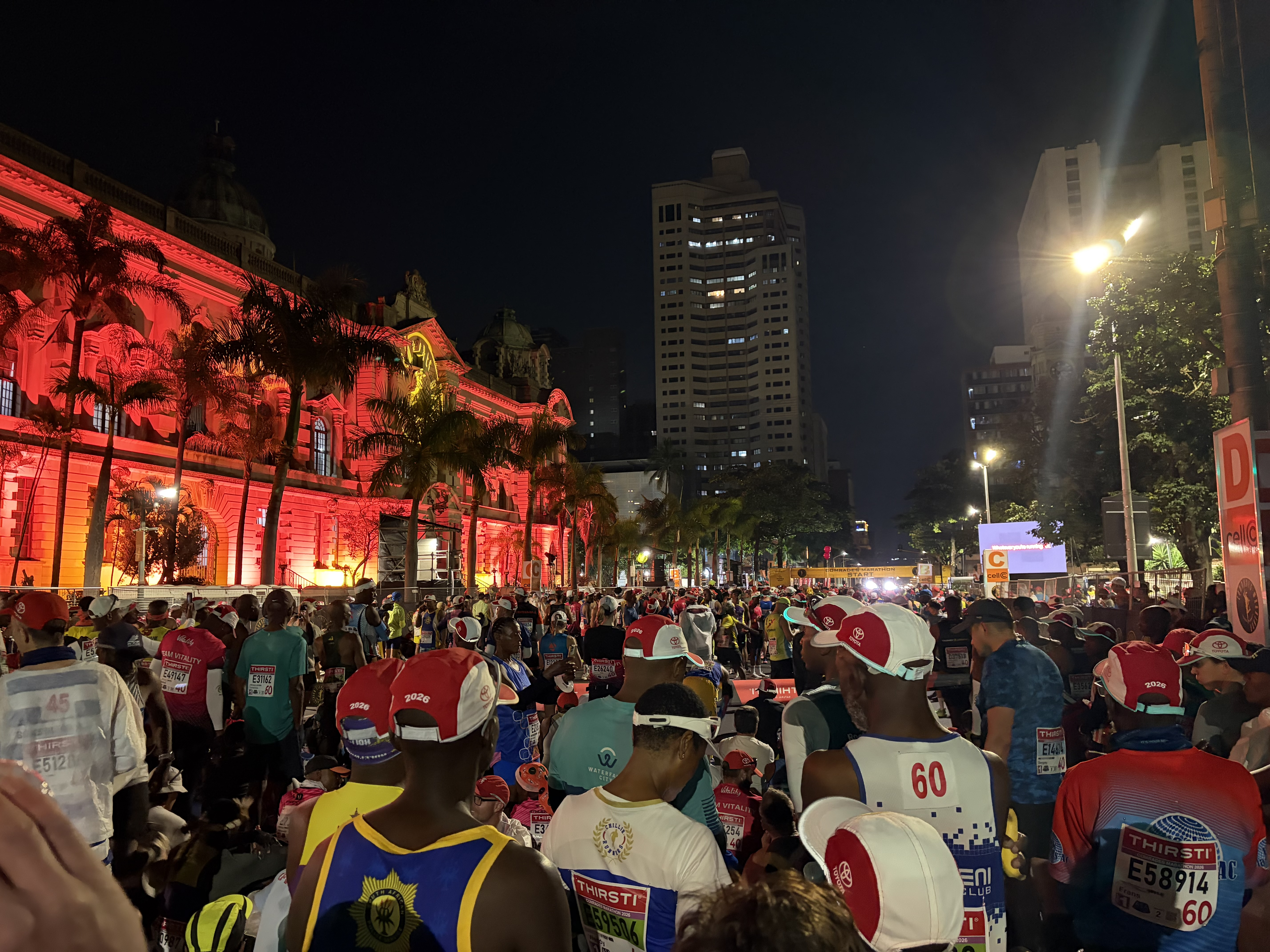
- Runners lined up in Durban for the start of the 2026 Comrades Marathon
- Location: KwaZulu-Natal, South Africa.
- Dates: 14 June 2026 (4 months ago)
- Website: www.comrades.com

Champions
- Men: George Kusche (5:15:56)
- Women: Gerda Steyn (5:44:53)

The 2026 Comrades Marathon was the 99th edition of the Comrades Marathon, taking place on 14 June 2026. The race was an "up" run, starting in Durban and finishing in Pietermaritzburg, covering 85.777 kilometres. The men's race was won by George Kusche, who set a new men's Up Run record of 5:15:56. Gerda Steyn won the women's race for a fifth time, setting a new women's Up Run record of 5:44:53.

== Pre-Race ==
=== Pre-Race Favourites ===
The men's race was expected to be unusually competitive, with several recent Comrades champions, leading South African runners and a strong international field entered. Piet Wiersma, the 2024 Up Run winner and 2023 and 2025 runner-up, was expected to be among the leading contenders. Tete Dijana, winner of the 2022, 2023 and 2025 Down Runs, was also expected to contend, although he was seeking his first Up Run victory. Former winners Edward Mothibi and Bongmusa Mthembu were also identified among the contenders.

The international men's field was described as particularly strong, with several leading 100 km specialists entered, including Aleksandr Sorokin, Jumpei Yamaguchi, Charlie Lawrence, Nikolai Volkov, Nao Kazami, and Haruki Okayama. South African runner George Kusche was also mentioned among the possible challengers after a strong start to 2026, although he downplayed suggestions that he should be considered one of the favourites. Other South African contenders included Onalenna Khonkhobe, Sibusiso Kubheka, Joseph Manyedi, Gordon Lesetedi and David Gatebe.

In the women's race, Gerda Steyn entered as the clear favourite. Steyn was aiming for a fifth Comrades title and a fourth consecutive victory, having won the 2023 and 2025 Down Runs and the 2024 Up Run. She had also won the 2026 Two Oceans Marathon earlier in the year. Steyn also held both the Up Run and Down Run course records entering the race.

The leading challengers in the women's field included Shelmith Muriuki, who had finished third in 2025, Nobukhosi Tshuma, Irvette van Zyl, Jenet Mbhele, Dominika Stelmach, Courtney Olsen, Carla Molinaro and Caitriona Jennings.

=== Race logistics and participation ===
The 2026 race was the 50th official Up Run in Comrades Marathon history. The race started at Durban City Hall and finished at Scottsville Racecourse in Pietermaritzburg. The official measured distance for the race was 85.777 km, making it the shortest Up Run in recent Comrades Marathon history. The previous shortest Up Run was the 2024 edition, which was 85.910 km.

The official slogan for the 2026 race was "Ska Fela Moya", a Setswana phrase meaning "Don't give up". Entries for the race sold out in less than 10 hours, reaching the cap of 22,000 entrants. By the qualification deadline, 21,633 entrants had confirmed their places on the start line, representing 95.37% of entrants. This was reported as the highest qualification rate for the race in more than a decade.

The total prize purse for the 2026 race was increased by 10% to R8.2 million, with the men's and women's winners each due to receive R925,000. Additional record incentives of R605,000 were available for athletes who broke the men's or women's Up Run records.

=== Broadcast ===
The 2026 Comrades Marathon was scheduled to be broadcast live and free on YouTube for the first time. The broadcast was expected to include 44 mobile cameras, with a focus on the elite races during the first half of the event. The commentary team was scheduled to be led by Gerald de Kock, with contributions from former Comrades winner Bruce Fordyce and women's race analysis from Adele Broodryk.

=== Changes from 2025 ===
For the 2026 race, the Comrades Marathon Association introduced a three-group start system, replacing the two-group start used for the 2025 Down Run. Group 1 started at 05:00, followed by Group 2 at 05:15 and Group 3 at 05:30. The groups were based on runners' qualifying times and were expected to include approximately 9,952 runners in Group 1, 6,704 in Group 2 and 4,972 in Group 3. The change was introduced to reduce congestion, improve runner flow and assist medical and emergency access along the route. All groups were scheduled to receive the full 12 hours to complete the race.

The 2026 race also introduced an enhanced cut-off system linked to the new staggered start. Intermediate cut-off points used a colour-coded "traffic-light" system, with green indicating that runners were comfortably within the required pace, amber warning that they were approaching the final reasonable pacing threshold, and red indicating that runners would not be permitted to continue. The cut-off system was intended to provide clearer pacing guidance and assist route management and medical access.

== Race Overview ==
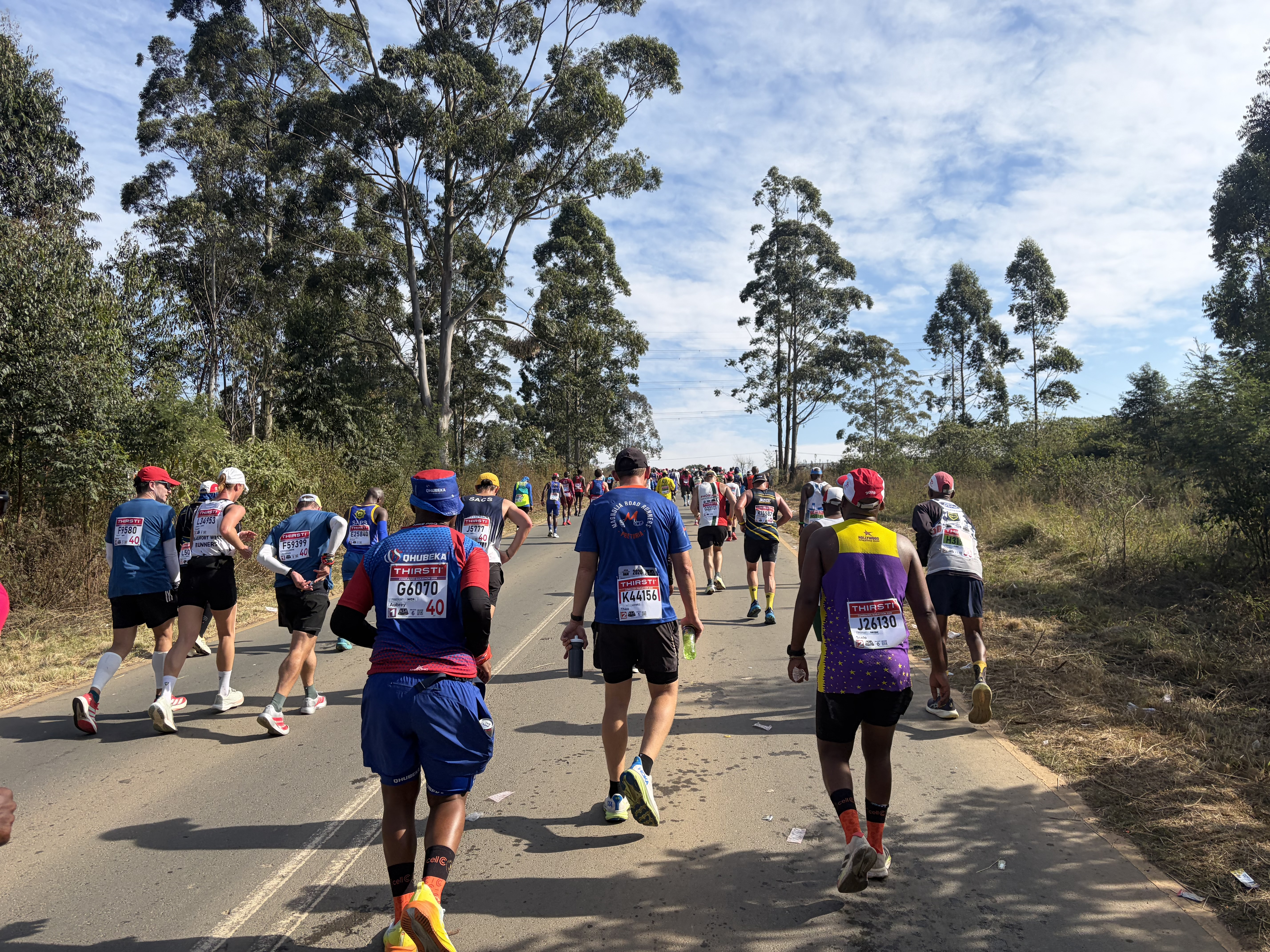
Runners in the 2026 Comrades Marathon near Cato Ridge

=== Men's ===
George Kusche won the men's race in a course record time of 5:15:56, breaking the men's Up Run record. Kusche, who had been identified before the race as a possible challenger rather than an outright favourite, produced a controlled performance and took the lead from Mbuti Mollo with just over 10 km remaining.

Mollo had led after halfway and opened a significant advantage, reportedly holding a lead of around seven minutes near the 60 km mark. That margin was reduced to less than two minutes with 18.4 km remaining as Kusche moved clear of the chasing group, which included former winners Piet Wiersma and Edward Mothibi. Kusche overtook Mollo late in the race and maintained his lead to the finish in Pietermaritzburg.

Wiersma, the defending Up Run champion, finished second in 5:19:36, while Mollo placed third in 5:21:31.

=== Women's ===
Gerda Steyn won the women's race in a time of 5:44:53, setting a new women's Up Run record and claiming her fifth Comrades Marathon title. The victory was also her fourth consecutive Comrades win, following victories in 2023, 2024 and 2025.

Steyn and Nobukhosi Tshuma were together during much of the race before Steyn moved ahead around the four-hour mark. She maintained her lead through the closing stages to finish in Pietermaritzburg, improving on her previous Up Run record of 5:49:46 set in 2024.

Tshuma finished second in 5:53:36, while Irvette van Zyl placed third in 6:02:30.

== Top 10 Results ==
=== Men ===
Position	Name	Country	Time
1st place, gold medalist(s)	George Kusche	South Africa	5:15:56
2nd place, silver medalist(s)	Piet Wiersma	Netherlands	5:19:36
3rd place, bronze medalist(s)	Mbuti Mollo	South Africa	5:21:31
4	Alex Milne	United Kingdom	5:22:29
5	Haruki Okayama	Japan	5:24:46
6	Charlie Lawrence	United States	5:27:08
7	Lloyd Bosman	South Africa	5:28:53
8	Nikolai Volkov	Russia	5:28:59
9	Vasilii Korytkin	Russia	5:29:29
10	Tebogo Pulusa	South Africa	5:29:40

=== Women ===
Position	Name	Country	Time
1st place, gold medalist(s)	Gerda Steyn	South Africa	5:44:53
2nd place, silver medalist(s)	Nobukhosi Tshuma	Zimbabwe	5:53:36
3rd place, bronze medalist(s)	Irvette van Zyl	South Africa	6:02:30
4	Shelmith Muriuki	Kenya	6:06:38
5	Naomi Robinson	United Kingdom	6:07:55
6	Loveness Madziva	Zimbabwe	6:09:54
7	Courtney Olsen	United States	6:11:20
8	Dikeledi Majara	Lesotho	6:12:29
9	Jenet Mbhele	South Africa	6:13:08
10	Carla Molinaro	United Kingdom	6:14:04
