= 2023 Comrades Marathon =

Ultramarathon in South Africa

96th Comrades Marathon
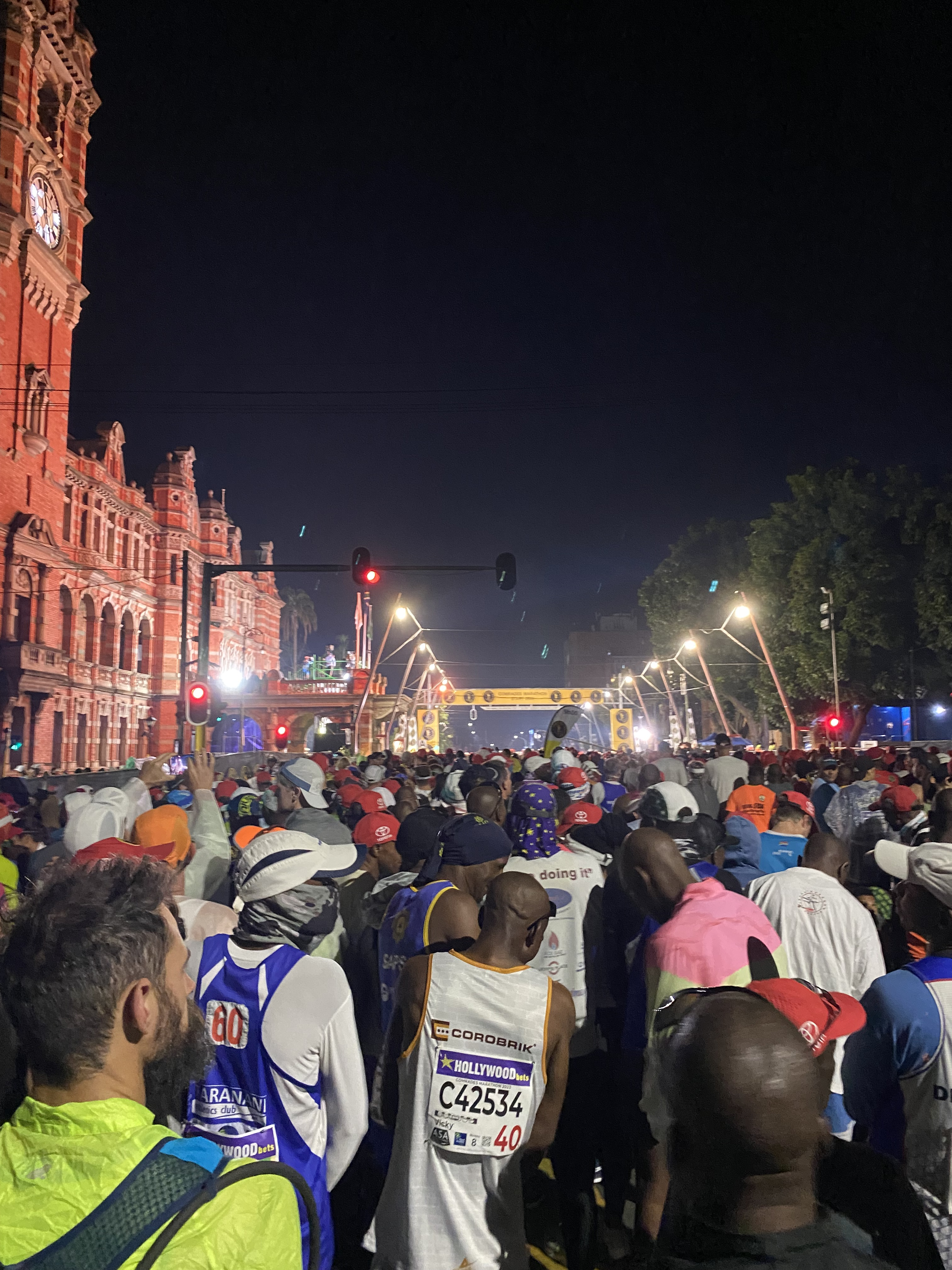
- Runners waiting for the start of the 2023 Comrades Marathon
- Location: KwaZulu Natal, South Africa
- Dates: June 11, 2023 (3 years ago)
- Website: https://www.comrades.com

Champions
- Men: Tete Dijana (5:13:58)
- Women: Gerda Steyn (5:44:54)

The 2023 Comrades Marathon is the 96th edition of the Comrades Marathon that took place on Sunday, June 11, 2023. The course was a 87.701km down run, running from Pietermaritzburg to Durban and was approximately 2.2 km shorter than the prior year's 89.885 km down run.

== Race Overview ==
The 96th edition of the Comrades Marathon covering the 87 km "down" route from Pietermaritzburg to Durban was won by Tete Dijana and Gerda Steyn. With over 17,000 starters, it was the world's largest ultra marathons that year. The race was marked by record-breaking performances in both the men's and women's events, with long-standing course records being shattered.

=== Men's Race ===
South African runner Tete Dijana retained his Comrades title in emphatic fashion, finishing in 5:13:58 to break David Gatebe’s 2016 down run record of 5:18:19 by nearly five minutes. Dijana, running for the Nedbank Running Club, broke away in the final stages after working with a lead pack that included fellow South Africans Edward Mothibi and Piet Wiersma of the Netherlands. Wiersma, the 2022 100 km world bronze medallist, chased hard in the closing kilometres and finished just three seconds behind in 5:14:01. Mothibi, the 2019 champion, placed third in 5:17:34—also under the previous course record.

The top five positions were all claimed by South African athletes, with Gordon Lesetedi finishing fourth in 5:20:43 and Rufus Photo rounding out the top five in 5:21:48. Other notable performances included Johannes Makgetla (6th, 5:23:34), Teboho Sello (7th, 5:24:23), and Russian athlete Aleksei Beresnev, the highest-placed international outside Wiersma, who came eighth in 5:24:41.

=== Women's Race ===
South Africa’s Gerda Steyn delivered a historic performance in the women’s race, winning in a time of 5:44:54 and obliterating Frith van der Merwe’s 1989 down run record of 5:54:43 by nearly ten minutes. Steyn’s run also made her the only athlete in Comrades history to hold both the up and down run course records, having won the 2019 “up” run in 5:58:53.

Adele Broodryk finished second for the second consecutive year, clocking 5:56:26, the only other woman to break the six-hour barrier. The podium was completed by Great Britain's Carla Molinaro in 6:00:23, followed by Poland's Dominika Stelmach (4th, 6:06:02) and Ireland's Caitriona Jennings (5th, 6:10:27). .

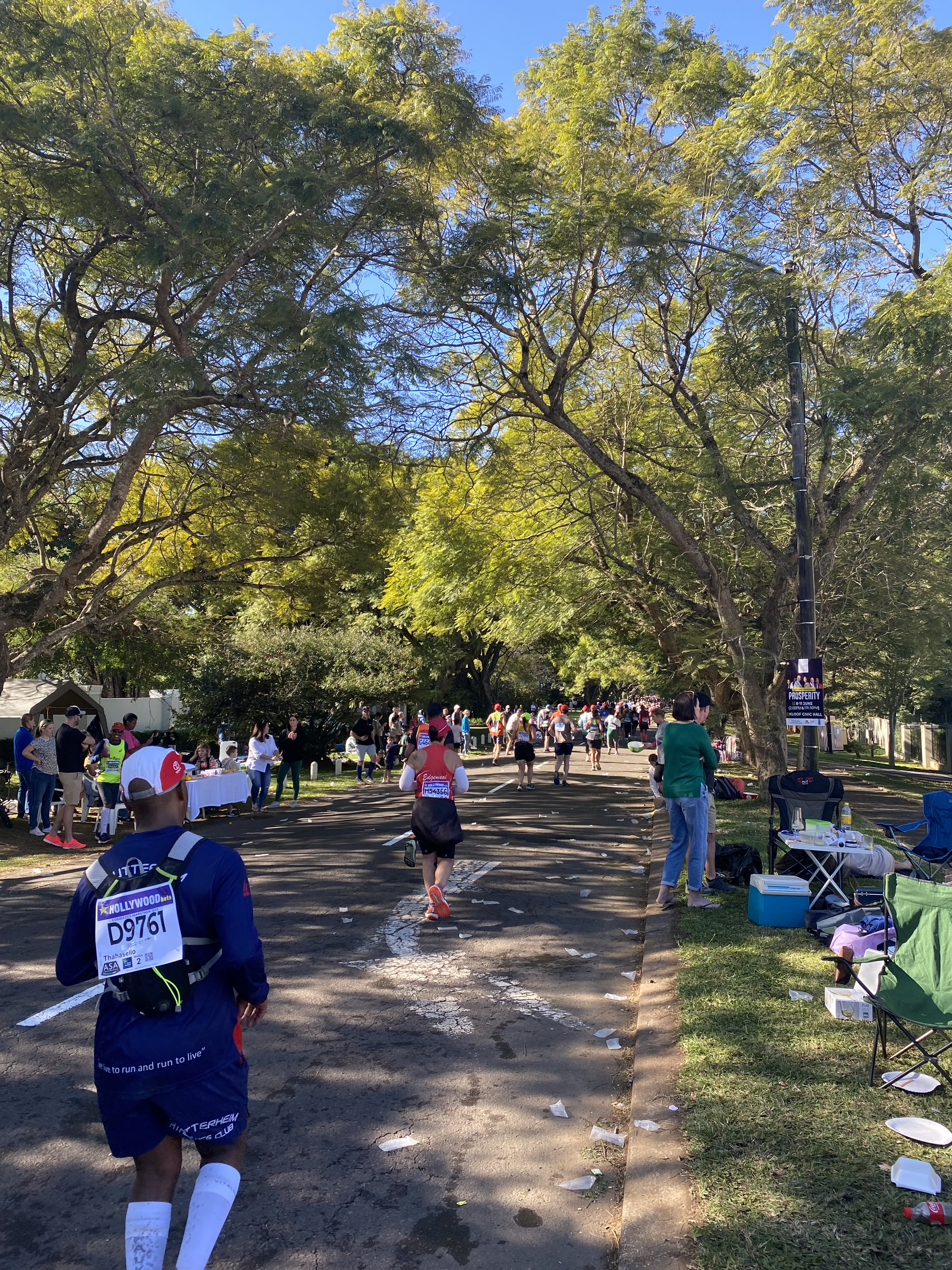
Runners in the 2023 Comrades Marathon on Old Main Road in Kloof, KwaZulu-Natal, near the M13 highway

== Results ==
=== Men ===
Men's top 10 finishers
Position	Athlete	Country	Time
1st place, gold medalist(s)	Tete Dijana	South Africa	5:13:58 Down CR
2nd place, silver medalist(s)	Piet Wiersma	Netherlands	5:14:01
3rd place, bronze medalist(s)	Edward Mothibi	South Africa	5:17:34
4	Gordon Lesetedi	South Africa	5:20:43
5	Rufus Photo	South Africa	5:21:48
6	Johannes Makgetla	Kenya	5:23:34
7	Teboho Sello	Lesotho	5:24:23
8	Aleksei Beresnev	Russia	5:24:41
9	Gift Kelehe	South Africa	5:27:53
10	Joseph Manyedi	South Africa	5:29:49

=== Women ===
Women's top 10 finishers
Position	Athlete	Country	Time
1st place, gold medalist(s)	Gerda Steyn	South Africa	5:44:54 Down CR
2nd place, silver medalist(s)	Adele Broodryk	South Africa	5:56:26
3rd place, bronze medalist(s)	Carla Molinaro	South Africa	6:00:23
4	Dominika Stelmach	Poland	6:06:02
5	Caitriona Jennings	Ireland	6:10:27
6	Alexandra Morozova	Russia	6:14:33
7	Petra Pastorova	Czech Republic	6:22:34
8	Noora Honkala	Finland	6:25:00
9	Camille Chaigneau	France	6:26:58
10	Jenet Mbhele	South Africa	6:27:14
