= Awad Darawshe =

Israeli-Arab paramedic and victim of Hamas

Awad Musa Darawshe
- Awad Musa Darawshe
- Born: Awad Musa Darawshe; 1999/2000; Iksal
- Died: 7 October 2023 (aged 23); Nova music festival massacre
- Cause of death: October 7 attacks
- Burial place: Iksal
- Other names: Awad Darawsheh, Awad Musa Darawshe, Awad Darusha
- Citizenship: Israel
- Occupation: Paramedic
- Years active: 2016–2023
- Employer(s): Yossi Ambulance; United Hatzalah
- Known for: Emergency medical services during Nova music festival massacre
- Honours: Ministry of Foreign Affairs recognition; President of Israel family visit; President of the United States family meeting; Awad Darawsheh: The Story of a Hero (2023); Names & Faces art exhibit (2023); One Day in October: Forty Heroes, Forty Stories (2024); Gaza en los Cielos poetry book (2024); 2025 Comrades Marathon dedication; United Hatzalah feature (2026)

Awad Musa Darawshe (Note: His name is alternatively spelled in English language sources as: Awad Darawshe, Awad Darawsheh, Awad Musa Darawshe, and Awad Darusha.) (1999/2000 (Note: As per age 23 on 7 October 2023.) – 7 October 2023) was an Arab-Israeli emergency medical technician and paramedic who was killed by Hamas members at the Nova music festival massacre while providing first-aid treatment to civilians. Darawshe was raised in the predominantly Arab town of Iksal, before gaining medical education with the Israeli ambulance service, Magen David Adom. He was employed by Yossi Ambulances while also serving as a volunteer with United Hatzalah. At the outbreak of the October 7 attacks, Darawshe refused orders from his superiors and requests from his friends to evacuate from the music festival. Instead, he chose to remain behind, believing he could talk down the terrorists with his Arabic language skills. He was killed by members of Hamas, while bandaging a festival attendee under the festival stage.

After his death, Darawshe became an international symbol of Arab-Israeli sacrifice and interfaith solidarity. Over 20,000 people attended his funeral in Iksal, across multiple faith communities, including Muslim, Jewish, Christian, Druze, and Circassians. The Ministry of Foreign Affairs of Israel called him a hero and the President of Israel personally called his parents to offer condolences from the nation to his family. President of the United States Joe Biden met with his family to offer compassion, and heard about his story.

Darawshe's emergency medical efforts and selflessness inspired an art exhibit, Names & Faces, in Jerusalem, and graffiti art in Tel Aviv. His story was featured in published books including Against All Odds, and One Day in October: Forty Heroes, Forty Stories, and a Spanish language book of poetry, Gaza en los Cielos. An ultramarathon runner in the 2025 Comrades Marathon in KwaZulu-Natal, South Africa was motivated to run in honor of Darawshe.

== Early life and family ==
=== Iksal upbringing ===
Darawshe volunteered as a paramedic for United Hatzalah ambulance service.

Awad Musa Darawshe was from Iksal, a predominantly Arab town located 5 kilometres (3.1 mi) southeast of Nazareth. His family was of the Muslim faith, and had resided in the town of Iksal for multiple generations. His parents were Musa Darawshe and Huda Darawshe. He had three sisters and one brother. He was the youngest child among his siblings. His mother called him her "hugging son", because he would sit beside her and hug her as she watched programs on the television. His cousin, Mohammad Darawshe, worked to create cultural ties between Jewish people and Arabs in Israel and Palestine. He was co-executive director of the Abraham Fund Initiatives, and was director of strategy at the Givat Haviva Center.

=== Medical training ===
Darawshe originally intended to become a medical doctor. At age 16, he trained as an emergency medical technician with the Magen David Adom ambulance service in Israel. After his initial emergency medical services training, he volunteered on ambulances for one year before gaining employment in the field. He started studying medicine in Georgia. He studied there to become a physician for one year of medical school. With the outbreak of the COVID-19 pandemic, Darawshe returned home to Iksal, and planned to continue his medical studies after the pandemic had resolved. He had not wanted to continue his medical studies in a one-hundred-percent virtual format over Zoom Communications video.

=== Paramedic experience ===
Darawshe enrolled in advanced studies in Israel and became a paramedic. He enjoyed the aspect of emergency medicine where he was quickly able to see the results of his treatment to his patients. He worked with the ambulance company, Yossi Ambulances, and also volunteered as a paramedic with United Hatzalah ambulance organization. Within United Hatzalah, his supervisor was Ashraf Ayoub. His volunteer work for United Hatzalah was based out of their branch located in Nazareth. In addition to his emergency medical services duties with the two ambulance companies, Darawshe also worked in his village as a cook, and as a waiter at a wedding hall. He had future aspirations to create his own private ambulance company.

== Nova music festival massacre ==
Drone view Nova Festival Victims Memorial at the massacre site

=== Ambulance standby shift ===
Darawshe was near the area of Nova music festival massacre at the time it was initially attacked by Hamas members outside of kibbutz Re'im. He had been staffing a standby ambulance with an emergency medical services company called Yossi Ambulances. He was part of a standby team with six other paramedics and three ambulances. He brought his entire fellow emergency medical services workers food from his home for their three-day assigned standby duties at the music festival. They arrived at the festival two days before the attacks, and had been treating injuries to attendees more typical of a standard music festival, including dehydration and syncope. His medical duties at the music festival included supervision of both an ambulance and an all-terrain vehicle.

One of his colleagues was a Jewish paramedic, named Yaniv Riz. The Arab and Jewish paramedic duo often requested to be paired as emergency medical services partners on shifts together. They split apart as the festival was attacked, in order to treat more people from the mass casualty incident.

=== Mass casualty incident ===
During the attack at the music festival, Darawshe used his all-terrain vehicle to go back-and-forth into the party area to bring wounded civilians back to the medical treatment tent. When a nurse at the medical treatment tent with him began to become visibly upset, Darawshe gave her a hug and encouraged her to continue their caregiving, and said, "We don't have time for that now. Pick yourself up, let's be strong! You'll be blessed! Pick yourself up!"

His friends pleaded with him to evacuate the premises. The paramedic station leader ordered the evacuation of the area. All of his other paramedic associates who followed the orders to evacuate survived the Hamas attack. He refused, and told his friends and colleagues that he wanted to remain behind to care for injured civilians on site. He assisted other paramedics in escaping the scene. Darawshe told his emergency colleagues, "Go, I think I'll be fine." He informed them of his medical supply status, "I still have bandages left to use."

=== Death during medical response ===
Darawshe was killed by members of Hamas at the music festival, as he was in the act of providing first-aid treatment to concert attendees. When he received fatal gunfire from Hamas, he was in the process of bandaging an injured concert goer. He was shot while underneath the music stage. He was wearing his paramedic uniform vest when he died. His body was found by his colleague Yaniv Riz, with a gunshot wound to his stomach, and first-aid bandages in his hands. He was found to have two gunshot wounds to his left side that hit his heart. He died at the age of 23 years old. After his death, Hamas terrorists stole his ambulance and drove it into the Gaza strip.

His cousin, Mohammad Darawshe, was interviewed by the Associated Press and The Jerusalem Post, and recounted what his relative had said when he was asked to evacuate during the attack. The paramedic thought he could serve as a mediator with the Hamas terrorists due to his Arabic language and culture skills. His cousin recalled he remarked, "No, I'm not leaving. I speak Arabic, I think I can manage." According to Darawshe's father, after another paramedic exhorted him to evacuate the scene and run away, his last words were, "You run away, I'll work it out with them."

== Funeral ==
=== Hometown procession ===
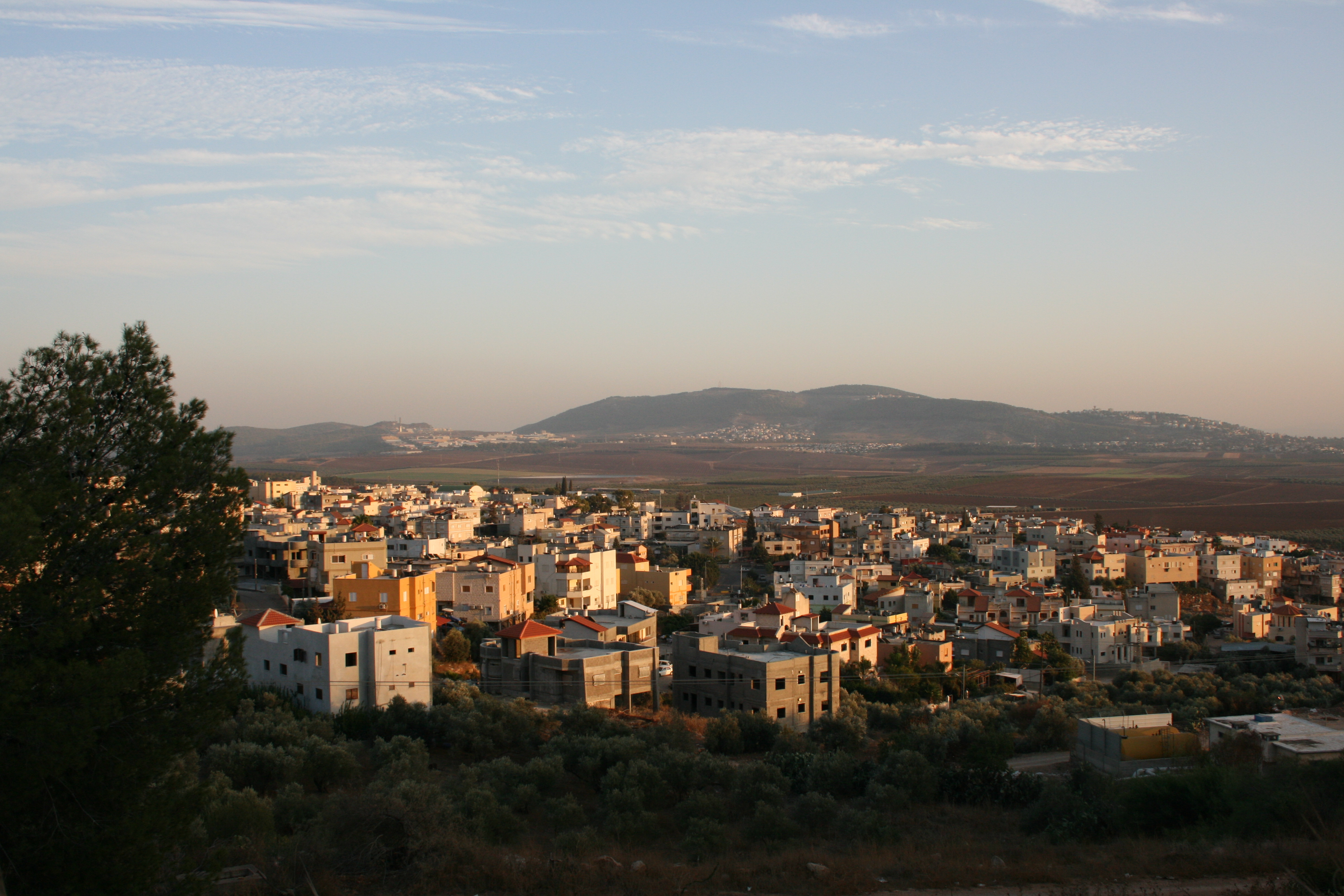
A view of Iksal from the east, looking towards the southwest

Darawshe's family did not learn of his demise at the Nova music festival until 6 days after the October 7 attacks. Multiple family members tried to call him on his cellphone, but received no response. On behalf of his family, they sent his cousin Kazim Khlilih the night of October 7, to go in-person to multiple hospitals in Israel and ask for information about Darawshe. He encountered an individual from the festival at one of the hospitals in the East of Israel who recognized the picture of his cousin, and said that Darawshe was shot twice at the festival. By the time he told his aunt, Darawshe's mother, they had heard confirmation from the Israeli government. The family were formally notified of Darawshe's death, on 12 October 2023. The family told Yedioth Ahronoth, "From the moment we learned about the attack, we never stopped searching for him. We posted his name and picture on social media and waited for a call to let us know he was alive." They explained their reaction after hearing formal notification from the Israel Defense Forces of his murder, "soldiers from the IDF Home Front Command came and told us he was killed. We screamed, we cried. This isn’t what we wanted to hear."

His funeral took place in his hometown of Iksal, on 12 October 2023. The funeral procession included a motorcade of ten ambulances and twenty first-responder motorcycles from Yossi Ambulances. 20,000 people attended his funeral, including 1,000 of the Jewish faith. The town of Iksal itself only had a population of 15,000 at the time. In addition to Muslims and Jewish people, attendees at his funeral included Circassians, Druze, and Christians. Both a rabbi and a priest who were friends of Darawshe's father came to say prayers on his behalf. Jewish and Arab emergency medical colleagues attended the funeral together. His emergency medical services colleagues came to share his acts of selflessness with his family. Imams from all three of the town's different mosques spoke at his funeral. In the months after his death, banners displaying his image were affixed at street entrances around Iksal.

His cousin Mohammad Darawshe said his family felt pride in his final medical efforts to help others, "We are very proud of his actions. This is what we would expect from him and what we expect from everyone in our family — to be human, to stay human and to die human." Reflecting on the loss of his son, Darawshe's father hoped for peace, "I pray, I pray that now, after what happened to us, we’ll be able to live in peace and quiet. We have to make a change in our lives; we are here together, we need to accept each other and live together."

In addition to his gravesite, his memorial is represented by his photograph on a plaque at the Nova music festival massacre site near kibbutz Re'im.

=== National memorial ===
On 7 October 2024, Darawshe's sister Maysam Abu Wasel Darawshe spoke at the one-year memorial of the October 7 attacks in an anniversary ceremony arranged by the Hostages and Missing Families Forum at Yarkon Park in Tel Aviv, Israel. Hundreds of people had gathered there on the anniversary of her brother's death to remember him. She spoke in the Hebrew language and described her brother's hopes and achievements in his life. She said he was, "our light, our life, someone who filled our home with warmth and love". She then switched to Arabic and quoted her mother speaking about her brother, "Awad was a gift from heaven. His journey with us was short. Yet it carried within it multiple and substantial meanings. He taught us how to love each other and help each other, and how not to keep our envy, hatred and jealousy inside." She acknowledged that some within Israel conflated the Arabic language with violent attacks, but noted her brother's native tongue was, "the language in which we dreamed of a better future, of love, peace and life." She switched back to Hebrew and concluded, "Awad, I hope you hear me. Shukran [Thank you, in Arabic]."

== Legacy ==
=== State recognition ===
President of the United States Joe Biden met with Darawshe's cousin on behalf of his family on 18 October 2023.

The Ministry of Foreign Affairs of Israel confirmed Darawshe's death and stated, "A hero. May his memory be a blessing." The President of Israel called Darawshe's family to express the condolences of the nation. Israeli President Isaac Herzog said in his call to Darawshe's father that Arabs and Jewish people shared in mourning his son as cousins. President Herzog also subsequently personally visited Darawshe's family at their home, and told them their son was a hero due to his actions during the October 7 attacks. Darawshe was recognized by the Israel government agency Bituah Leumi memorial database, La'ad, which honored victims of terrorist acts. The Associated Press compared him to his cousin, noting his cousin, "works to bridge the gap between Israel’s Jewish and Arab citizens — the ethos of the Darawshe family for which Awad made the ultimate sacrifice." The story of Darawshe's sacrifice spread on social media in Israel, and increased feelings of solidarity from Israeli-Arabs towards the country. The Times of Israel commented on the impact of his medical service in the face of tragedy, noting, "Darawshe’s story stands as a symbol of the contribution and sacrifice of members of Israel's Arab minority in facing the deadly Hamas assault that claimed the lives of over 1,300 Israelis, the majority of them civilians."

United Hatzalah released a statement on his death which said Darawshe "was a dedicated volunteer in our Nazareth Branch and was murdered by Hamas." They noted of his character within emergency medical services, "He was an incredible person who helped everyone he could and never hesitated to save others, even in his death." The chief of the Christian and Muslim chapters of United Hatzalah, Samara Ala, compared Darawshe's actions to those of physician Tarek Abu Arar, a fellow emergency medical services worker who was used as a human shield and shot by Hamas. She noted, "the Arab chapters of United Hatzalah have come out in force to help save lives during this difficult period. Some of our members have been killed ... Yet we are proud that we are able to do our part and save lives."

His story was featured in a November 2023 position paper by the group, Physicians for Human Rights–Israel, on assaults on healthcare workers. In response to his death and that of other emergency medical services workers, Israel acquired additional armored ambulances in 2024, that were able to withstand hits from gunfire.

His cousin represented the family, and was invited by President of the United States Joe Biden to a meeting with families of victims and hostages, during the U.S. President's visit to Israel on 18 October 2023. He had the opportunity to share his cousin's story with President Biden. Darawshe felt the meeting with the U.S. President was "very compassionate". Darawshe emphasized the role Arab citizens within Israel played within medical services.

=== Cultural impact ===
Yalla Productions, co-founded by Syrian-American broadcast journalist Hayvi Bouzo, featured his story in November 2023. They reported on his actions, and featured interviews with his family, in a piece entitled, Awad Darawsheh: The Story of a Hero. Darawshe's likeness staying at the Nova festival in the act of bandaging a wounded attendee, was featured in an art exhibit reflecting on the October 7 attacks. Names & Faces was exhibited in Jerusalem, by artist Eden Spivak, in December 2023. His likeness also appeared alongside other medical professionals and first responders, in graffiti art in Tel Aviv.

In her 2024 book, Against All Odds, author Cristina de Mello e Souza Wildermuth cited Darawshe as an example of an ordinary person who displayed character of modern heroism. Algemeiner Journal noted in 2024 that Darawshe's actions exemplified, "rays of hope and humanity, as Israeli Arabs risked their lives to rescue their Jewish compatriots." Darawshe's actions were featured in the 2024 book, One Day in October: Forty Heroes, Forty Stories, by Yair Agmon and Oriya Mevorach. Darawshe's cousin Mohammed was a featured speaker at Stanford University in 2024, where he spoke about his family members and the impact of the conflict on Israeli-Arabs more broadly as well.

Ultramarathon runner, Klaas Mokgomole, competed in the 2025 Comrades Marathon with Darawshe's name on his sleeve. Mokgomole chose to feature Darawshe on his 89.98km run through KwaZulu-Natal, in order to bring attention to those who were seen as bridge builders between Palestinians and Israelis. He explained his motivation, that Darawshe "represented the very best of humanity". Mokgomole said he "believed in dignity, for everyone". Darawshe's story was featured in a Spanish language book of poetry called Gaza en los Cielos by Armando Lozano Hernández. The poem focused on Darawshe exemplified his courage and heroism. Jewish journalist at Al Jazeera, Ian Lloyd Neubauer, attempted to publish a piece he had written about Darawshe, in a profile of the victims of the October 7 attacks. After it was rejected for publication from Al Jazeera, Neubauer wrote a 2025 article for Australian Financial Review reflecting on his former employer's editorial practices. In a 2025 piece for The Washington Post discussing peace in the Middle East, Yuval Noah Harari cited the case of Darawshe's actions as an example of how during the October 7 attacks, "Many Arab-Israelis came to assist their Jewish neighbors, and some paid for it with their lives." The healthcare nanofiber technology company, Nurami Medical, dedicated their work to the memory of Darawshe.

United Hatzalah featured Darawshe, in a story on their site for the three-year anniversary of the October 7 attacks. United Hatzalah founder and president Eli Beer cited the example of Darawshe to explain the mission of their emergency medical services organization to save lives across ethnic backgrounds. Beer reflected back on the impact of Darawshe, in an interview with The Jerusalem Post in 2026, "He went in to save lives at the Nova festival. He was there as a medic on call. He went in to save lives, and he was murdered by Hamas." Writing in an October 2026 piece, former editor-in-chief of The Jerusalem Post, Avi Mayer, compared Darawshe's actions to those of the civilians onboard Flydubai Flight 1073. Mayer commented, "Names like ... Awad Darawshe shine in the firmament of Israeli heroism for their acts of bravery and sacrifice amidst the unspeakable horrors of October 7."

== See also ==
- Killing of Shani Louk – 2023 killing of Nova music festival attendee in Israel
- We Will Dance Again – 2024 American documentary film
- Nova – 2023 Israeli documentary film
- Nova Festival Victims Memorial – Monument in Kibbutz Re'im, Israel
- Noa Argamani – Israeli hostage taken by Hamas in 2023
