= Charné =

Charné is an Afrikaans, feminine given name. Notable people with this name include the following:

== Given name ==
- Charné Bosman, South African ultramarathon runner
- Charné Griesel, South African judoka
- Charné Maddocks, South African field hockey player
