= 2024 Comrades Marathon =

Ultramarathon in South Africa

97th Comrades Marathon
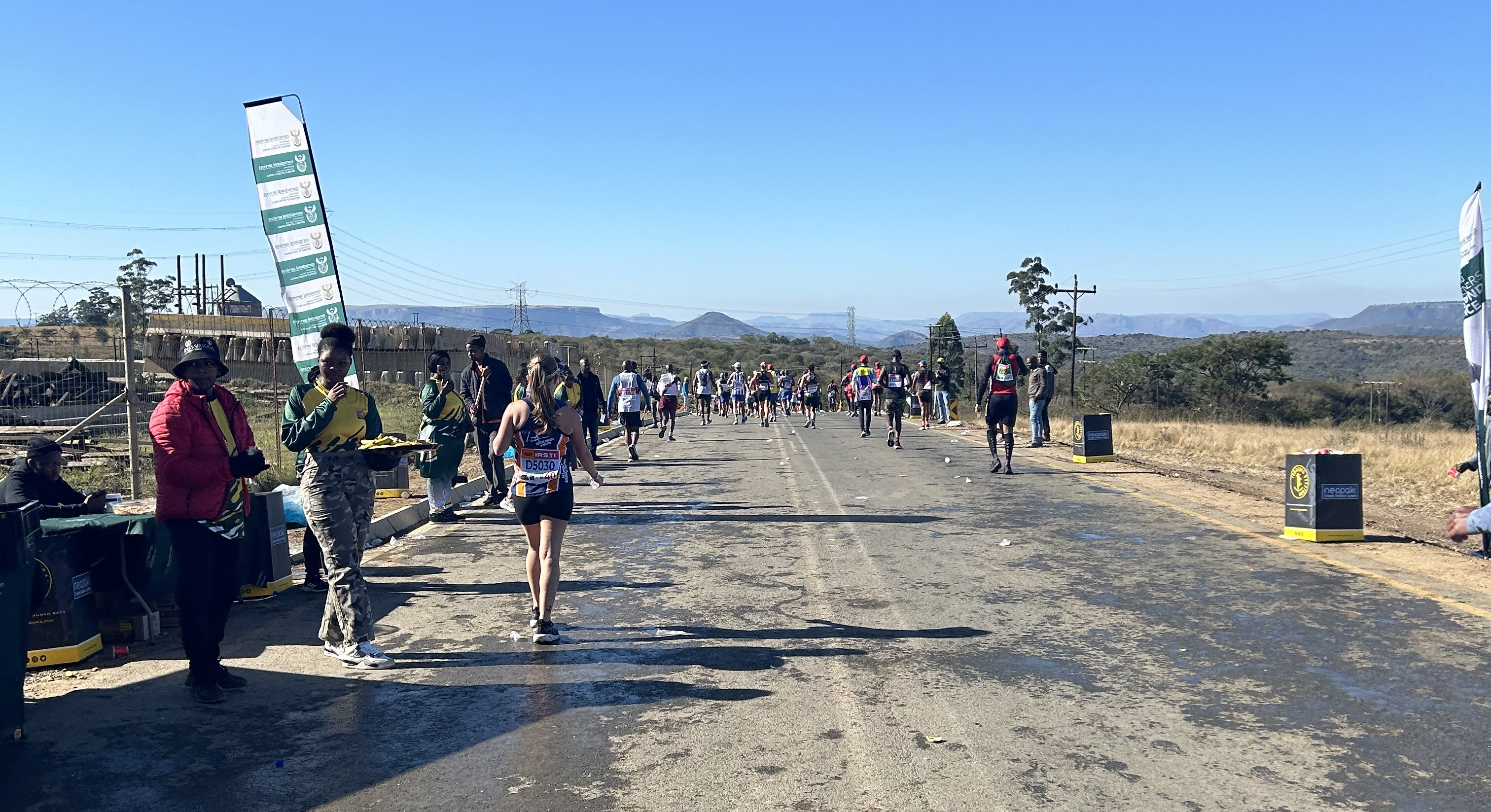
- Runners in Camperdown during the 2024 Comrades Marathon
- Location: KwaZulu-Natal, South Africa.
- Dates: 9 June 2024 (2 years ago)
- Website: www.comrades.com

Champions
- Men: Piet Wiersma (5:25:00)
- Women: Gerda Steyn (5:49:46)

The 2024 Comrades Marathon was the 97th edition of the ultramarathon, which took place on June 9, 2024. The race was an "up" run, starting in Durban and finishing in Pietermaritzburg, covering 85.91 kilometers.

== Race Overview ==
The 2024 edition of the Comrades Marathon was the world's largest ultra marathon in 2024 as of June 09, 2024, with 18,884 runners on the start line and 17,313 total finishers. Due to the 2022 Russian invasion of Ukraine Russian athletes competed under an International flag.

=== Men's Race ===
Dutch runner Piet Wiersma won the men's race with a time of 5:25:00, moving from 10th place at halfway to the front and winning by 45 seconds ahead of South Africa's Dan Moselakwe, who finished in 5:25:45. Ethiopia's Degefa Yohannese Lafebo was third, finishing in 5:27:48. This was Wiersma's first victory after finishing second to Tete Dijana in the 2023 'down' run.

=== Women's Race ===
In the women's race, South African Gerda Steyn delivered a record-breaking performance, winning her third Comrades title. Steyn shattered her own course record for the "up" run by over 9 minutes, finishing in 5:49:46. Russia's Alexandra Morozova finished second in 6:05:12, followed by American Courtney Olsen in 6:08:09.

== Top 10 Results ==
=== Men ===
Position	Name	Country	Time
1st place, gold medalist(s)	Piet Wiersma	Netherlands	5:25:00
2nd place, silver medalist(s)	Dan Moselakwe	South Africa	5:25:45
3rd place, bronze medalist(s)	Degefa Yohannese Lafebo	Ethiopia	5:27:48
4	Joseph Manyedi	South Africa	5:28:33
5	Andrew Davies	United Kingdom	5:30:46
6	Bongmusa Mthembu	South Africa	5:34:45
7	Elov Olsson	Sweden	5:35:24
8	Teboho Sello	Lesotho	5:36:11
9	Alex Milne	United Kingdom	5:36:51
10	Givemore Madzinganyama	Zimbabwe	5:37:09

=== Women ===
Position	Name	Country	Time
1st place, gold medalist(s)	Gerda Steyn	South Africa	5:49:46
2nd place, silver medalist(s)	Alexandra Morozova	International	6:05:12
3rd place, bronze medalist(s)	Courtney Olsen	United States	6:08:09
4	Carla Molinaro	South Africa	6:12:01
5	Nobukhosi Tshuma	Uganda	6:12:18
6	Antonina Iushina	International	6:12:28
7	Caitriona Jennings	Ireland	6:16:54
8	Jenet Mbhele	South Africa	6:16:54
9	Dominika Stelmach	Poland	6:19:24
10	Yulia Ryzhankova	International	6:28:22

== Highlights and Records ==
- Gerda Steyn broke her own "up" run record by more than nine minutes.
- Piet Wiersma achieved his first victory at the Comrades Marathon, following a second-place finish in 2023.
