= Frith van der Merwe =

South African long-distance runner

Frith van der Merwe (born 26 May 1964) is a South African long-distance athlete.

== Running career ==
She competed several times in the South African ultramarathon, the Comrades Marathon, in the late 1980s and early 1990s with success, setting female records for both up and down runs. Her 1989 record time of 5:54:43 in the down run was broken by Gerda Steyn in 2023. Her 1989 record time of 3:30:36 in the 56 km Two Oceans Marathon was broken by Gerda Steyn in 2022. Her best times in shorter distances were:

8 km 26:42

10 km 33:18 Germany, 1993

15 km 49:54 Belville, 1989

21.1 km 71:11 Voet of Africa, 1990

42.2 km 2:27 SA Champs, 1990

50 km 3:08 City to City, 1989

== Personal life ==
She married Michael Ivan Agliotti (b. 2 January 1957, d 25 May 1997) on 22 April 1995. She started studying at the University of the Witwatersrand. She is a teacher. She is currently teaching in Benoni, Gauteng

== Awards ==
In 2012 she was honoured as Benoni Northerns Sports Club's best ever sportsperson.

In 2013 she was inducted into the Gsport Hall of Fame.

== Achievements ==
- All results regarding marathon, unless stated otherwise

Year	Competition	Venue	Position	Notes
Representing South Africa
1993	World Championships	Stuttgart, Germany	7th	2:35:56
