= Stephen Muzhingi =

Zimbabwean ultramarathon runner

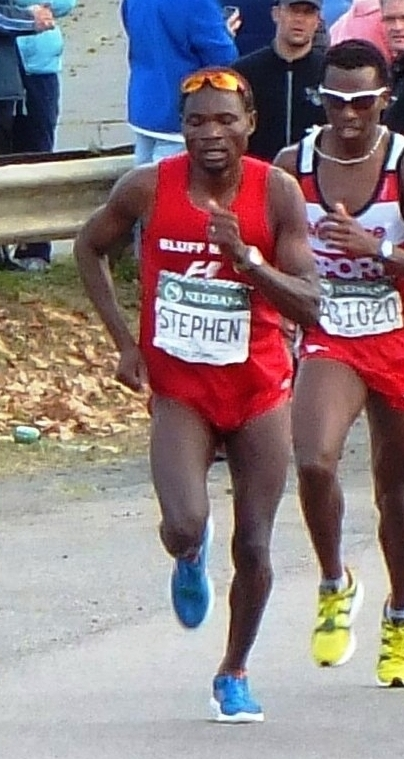
- Stephen Muzhingi at the 2012 Comrades Marathon

Personal information
- Nationality: Zimbabwean
- Born: Stephen Muzhingi; 17 October 1980 (age 45)

Sport
- Country: Zimbabwe
- Sport: Athletics
- Event: Ultramarathon
- Updated on 19 December 2014

Stephen Muzhingi (born 17 October 1980) is a Zimbabwean ultramarathon runner who won the Comrades Marathon on three consecutive occasions, and also won the Two Oceans Marathon.

== Notable achievements ==
Year	Tournament	Venue	Result	Distance
2009	Comrades Marathon	KwaZulu-Natal Province, South Africa	1st	89 km
2010	Comrades Marathon	KwaZulu-Natal Province, South Africa	1st	89 km
2011	Comrades Marathon	KwaZulu-Natal Province, South Africa	1st	89 km
2012	Two Oceans Marathon	Cape Town, South Africa	1st	56 km

=== Personal bests ===
- Marathon – 2:19:10 hrs (2011)
- 50 km road run – 2:49:56 hrs (2011)
