= Charné Bosman =

South African athletics competitor (born 1975)

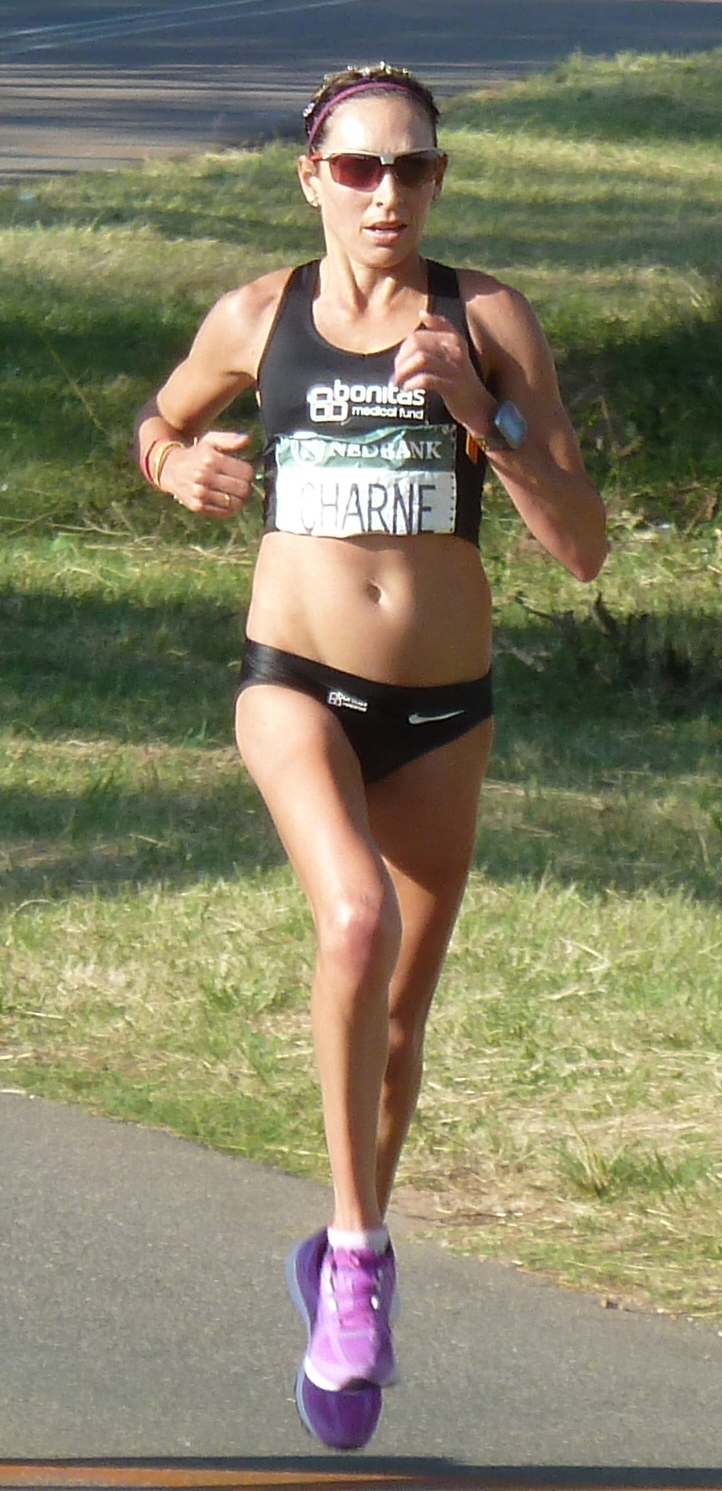
- At the 50 km (31 mi) mark, 2013 Comrades
- Born: November 6, 1975 (age 50); Malmesbury, Western Cape, South Africa
- Occupation: Long distance runner
- Known for: Winner of Comrades Marathon 2016
- Spouse: Carel (2007-2017)

Charné Bosman (6 November 1975 – ) of South Africa won the women's 2016 Comrades Marathon.
