= Irvette van Zyl =

South African long-distance runner

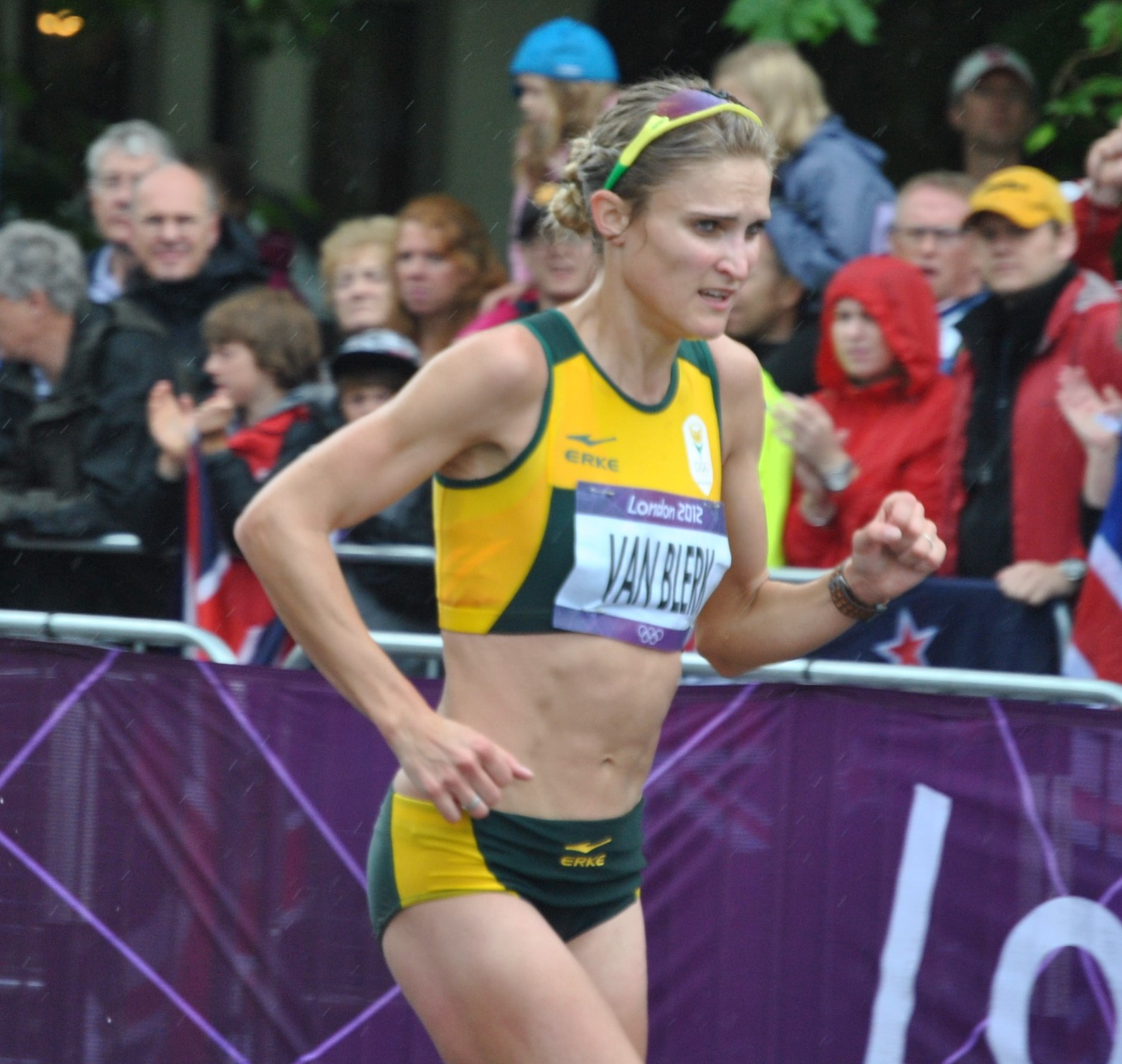
- Irvette van Zyl (van Blerk) during the 2012 Olympic Games

Personal information
- Born: Irvette van Blerk; 5 July 1987 (age 39)
- Height: 1.69 m (5 ft 7 in)
- Weight: 54 kg (119 lb)
- Spouse: L. J. van Zyl

Sport
- Country: South Africa
- Sport: Athletics
- Event: Marathon

Irvette van Zyl (née van Blerk, born 5 July 1987) is a South African long-distance runner and women's 50 km ultramarathon world record holder. She is a three-time Olympian for South Africa in the marathon, competing at the 2012, 2020, and 2024 Games. She has twice participated in the London Marathon and set her previous best time of 2:31:26 hours there in 2013. In 2021 she improved this time by almost 3 minutes to 2:28:40 at the Xiamen Marathon in Siena, Italy and again in 2022 by more than 2 minutes to 2:26:11 at the Valencia Marathon in Spain.

She began running from a young age, winning the Zevenheuvelenloop at age fifteen and running as a junior for South Africa three times at the IAAF World Cross Country Championships. She represented her country at the 2010 IAAF World Half Marathon Championships. In 2012, she married South African hurdler L. J. van Zyl.

== Career ==
Born in Sandton, South Africa, her first major win came at the Zevenheuvelenloop in 2002, where at the age of fifteen she won the high-profile 15K race while on holiday in the Netherlands. In 2003, she won the national junior title over 1500 metres and set a personal best of 4:17.49 minutes. She competed three times in the junior race at the IAAF World Cross Country Championships, coming 18th in 2002, 16th in 2003, and 26th in 2005.

She was runner-up at 10K runs in Durban and Port Elizabeth in 2003. In 2004, she ran a 3000 metres best of 9:29.78 minutes to win at the Dutch Golden Spike meeting. She also set a 10,000 metres best of 34:19.54 minutes, placing second at the national championships. On the roads that year, she again set new bests, winning the Cape Town 10K (33:12 min) and the Bedfordview half marathon (75:49 min). She competed sparingly from 2005 to 2007, during which time she studied at the University of Johannesburg. She finally improved on her 2004 half marathon best with a run of 75:41 hours in Bloemfontein in 2008. She marked her return to the top level of athletics with a 10,000 m win at the 2009 South African championships.

She won national titles in the 10K road and track distances. A win at the national half marathon championships in a personal best of 71:09 minutes earned her a spot at the 2010 IAAF World Half Marathon Championships, where on her senior international debut, she came 49th overall. The 2011 season saw her emerge as an elite level road runner. She dominated the 10K nationally, repeating her South African title win, taking victories in Durban, Pretoria and Cape Town, and ending the year with a best of 32:50 minutes for the distance. She also raced extensively in the half marathon, with highlights being a best of 70:56 minutes for eighth at the New York City Half Marathon and a runner-up finish at the Two Oceans Half Marathon.

Van Zyl made her marathon debut at the 2012 London Marathon, and her time of 2:33:41 brought her 18th place and spot on the South African team for the 2012 Summer Olympics in London. She did not finish the women's Olympic marathon on her return to the city in August. Van Zyl began 2013 with a four-win streak in South African half marathons. She placed tenth at the 2013 London Marathon, completing the distance in a time of 2:31:26 hours. She ran her best time of 2:28:40 at the 2021 Xiamen Tuscany Camp Elite Marathon in Siena, Italy.

In May 2021, she broke the world record for the women's 50 km ultramarathon with a time of 3:04:23, beating the previous holder Alyson Dixon's record by almost three minutes.

== Personal bests ==
- 1500 metres – 4:17.49 (2003)
- 3000 metres – 9:11.51 (2016)
- 5000 metres – 16:02.63 (2016)
- 10,000 metres – 34:12 (2004)
- Half marathon – 1:11:00 (2016)
- Marathon – 2:26:11 (2022)
- 50 km Ultramarathon– 3:04:23 (2021) WR
