= Tete Dijana =

South African ultramarathon runner (born 1988)

Tete Morena Dijana
Personal information
- Nationality: South African
- Born: 16 May 1988 (age 38)

Tete Morena Dijana (born 1988) is a South African ultramarathon runner who won the Comrades Marathon in 2022, 2023 and 2025.

Originally from Mahikeng in the North West province, Dijana quit his job as a security guard at North-West University to focus on running.

== Career ==
In his debut Comrades Marathon in 2019, Dijana finished in 50th place with a time of 6:25:03 and earned a silver medal. (Note: At the Comrades Marathon, a finish time under 7:30 qualifies a runner for a silver medal or better.)

Dijana joined the Nedbank Running Club in 2022. He finished second in the 2022 Nedbank Breaking Barriers 50 km, one place ahead of Edward Mothibi, a Nedbank teammate and the winner of the 2019 Comrades Marathon.

At the 2022 Comrades Marathon (down run), Dijana and Mothibi ran together as the race leaders during part of the second half of the race. Eventually, Dijana broke away with less than 10 km (6.2 mi) to go, and won the race with a time of 5:30:38, over three minutes ahead of Mothibi, who finished in second place. (Note: This was Dijana's second Comrades Marathon; the race was cancelled in 2020 and 2021 due to the coronavirus pandemic.)

Tete Dijana and Gerda Steyn had a record-breaking run at 2023 Comrades Marathon (down run) as they emerged as winners in the Men and Women categories.

After a difficult 2024 Comrades (up run) where he entered as favourite to win a hat-trick but ultimately finished 14th, he returned to the down run in 2025 winning his third title.
