= Caitriona Jennings =

Irish long-distance runner

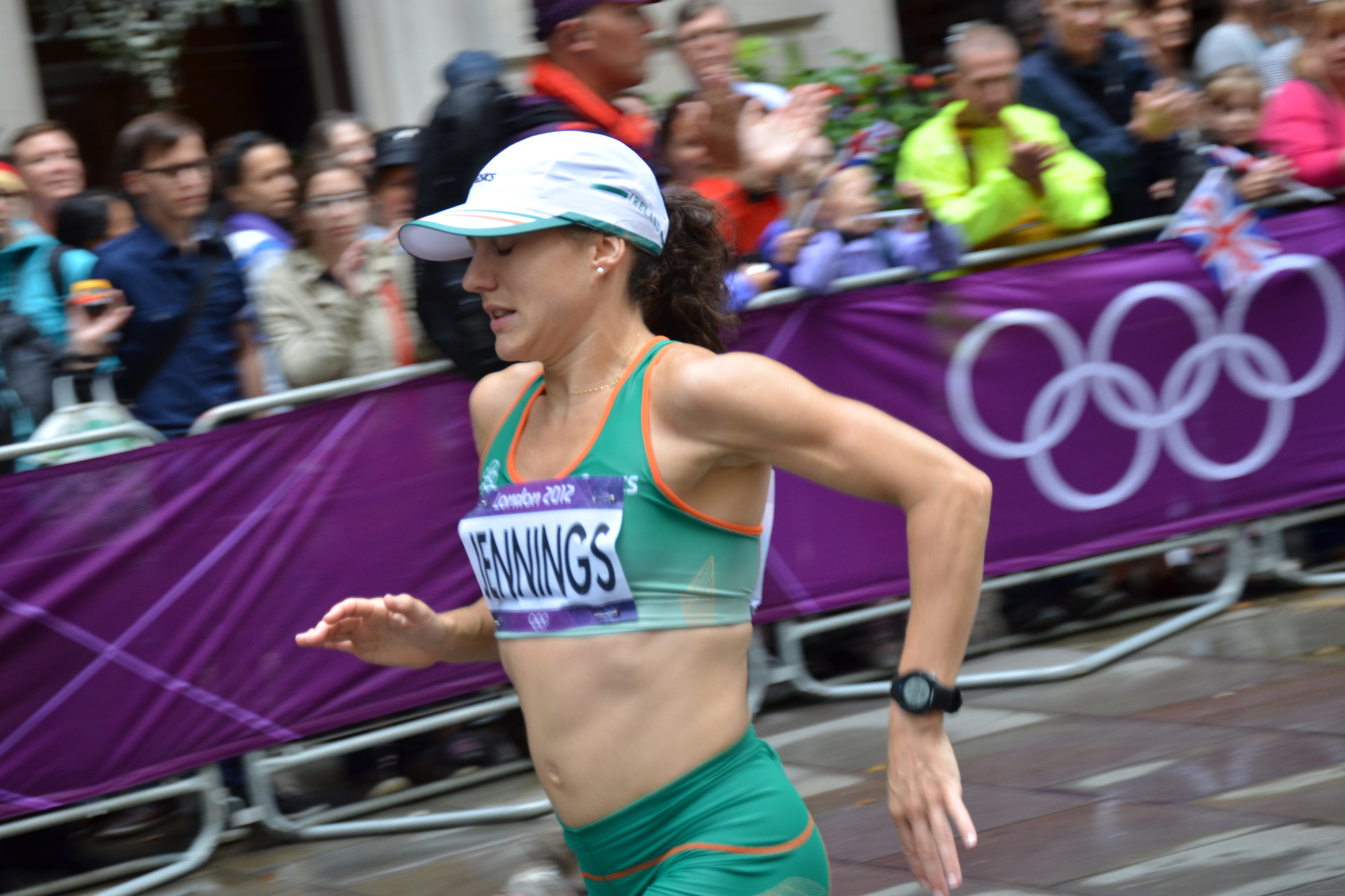
- Jennings in the marathon at the 2012 Summer Olympics

Personal information
- Born: 17 June 1980 (age 46)
- Height: 1.63 m (5 ft 4 in)
- Weight: 53 kg (117 lb)

Sport
- Country: Ireland
- Sport: Athletics
- Events: Marathon, Ultra Marathon

Achievements and titles
- National finals: Half marathon, (2009, 1st place)
- Highest world ranking: 469 (marathon)
- Personal bests: 100-mile: 12:37:04 (2025, WR); 100km road: 7:07:16 (2022, NR); Marathon: 2:36:17 (2012)
Medal record
Bronze medal – third place	IAU 100 km World Championships	2022

Caitriona Jennings (born 17 June 1980; from Letterkenny, County Donegal) is an Irish long distance and ultra distance runner who competed in the marathon at the 2012 Summer Olympics in London and holds the world record for the women's 100 mile distance.

== Early life ==
Jennings attended Loreto Convent Secondary School, Letterkenny, and went on to study Law and Accountancy at the University of Limerick before taking up a job as a tax advisor with PricewaterhouseCoopers in Dublin. She is the sister of Irish international rower and Rio 2016 Olympian Sinead Jennings.

== Athletics ==
Jennings is a former triathlete who represented Ireland at youth level. Since moving to Dublin she has trained with Rathfarnham WSAF AC although she currently runs for Letterkenny AC. She has been coached by Terry McConnon since 2007. In December 2009 she became involved with the Marathon Mission squad and in 2010 she won the Dublin Mini-Marathon. She ran her first marathon in Dublin in October 2011.

=== 2012 ===
Jennings achieved 'A' qualifying standard for the 2012 Olympics with a personal best time of two hours, 36 minutes and 14 seconds at the 2012 Rotterdam Marathon. Having taken two months off of work to train full-time for Rotterdam, and competing in just her second full marathon, her qualifying time was an improvement of nearly seven minutes from her first marathon.

Jennings was selected to represent Ireland at the 2012 Summer Olympics in the women's marathon along with Linda Byrne and Ava Hutchinson. Maria McCambridge, who had also run the 'A' qualifying standard missed out on selection as only three athletes from a nation may compete in the event. It was the first time that three Irish women have competed in the Olympic marathon.

In June she won the Newry half marathon in a time of one hour, 15 minutes and 25 seconds.

Suffering from plantar fasciitis and a stress fracture, Jennings finished last in the marathon at the 2012 Olympics in a time of 3:22:11, an hour behind winner Tiki Gelana.

=== 2015 ===
From 2012, Jennings slowly transitioned to longer distances and eventually ultra races. Her first major ultra was when she represented Ireland at the 2015 50k World Championships in Qatar, and finished 30th overall, 4th place woman, in a time of 3:31:58.

=== 2021 ===
Jennings won third place in the women's full marathon in the 2021 Hong Kong Standard Chartered Marathon, with a finishing time of 2:51:31.

=== 2022 ===
Jennings won bronze at the IAU 100 km World Championships in Bernau bei Berlin with a new national record of 7:07:16.

=== 2025 ===
Jennings set a new women's 100-mile world record at the 2025 Tunnel Hill 100 Mile in Vienna, Illinois on 9 November 2025, finishing in a time of 12 hours 37 minutes and four seconds.
