= David Gatebe =

South African long-distance runner

- Born: David Ramoela Gatebe; 13 August 1981; Kroonstad, South Africa
- Citizenship: South African
- Occupations: Sports and recreation officer
- Employer: Implats
- Known for: Winner of Comrades Marathon 2016; Winner of Two Oceans Marathon 2013
- Children: 2
- He took up ultra-marathon running in 2005
- He runs for Entsika Athletics Club

David Gatebe of South Africa won the 2016 Comrades Marathon in a course record.
