= Bongmusa Mthembu =

South Africa ultramarathon runner (born 1983)

Bongmusa Mthembu (born 27 June 1983) is a South Africa ultramarathon runner.

He was born in Bulwer, a village near Pietermaritzburg, Kwa-Zulu Natal, South Africa.

After matriculation he left Bulwer for Pietermaritzburg. He was hired as a bricklayer. At that time he was running only for fitness. In 2004 he started to enter races then in 2005 he won the Maritzburg Marathon.

He is known for his achievements at the Comrades Marathon, run annually between Durban and Pietermaritzburg in South Africa, where he is a 3-time winner (2014, 2017 and 2018) and an 8-time gold medal winner, finishing in the top 10 between 2009 and 2019. In 2019 he added to his racing honours by winning the 56 km Two Oceans Marathon in Cape Town.

He has also represented South Africa on the global stage. Mthembu finished 2nd and 3rd at the IAU 100km World Championships in 2016 and 2018 respectively. In 2019 Mthembu represented South Africa at the IAU 50km World Championships in Brasov, Romania where he finished 7th place individually. The South African team took home the gold medal in team scoring.

== Major Race Results ==
Race	Place	Time
Comrades Marathon 2006 (Up)	54	6:25:19
Comrades Marathon 2007 (Down)	31	6:07:35
Comrades Marathon 2008 (Up)	52	6:28:44
Comrades Marathon 2009 (Down)	7	5:41:52
Comrades Marathon 2010 (Down)	3	5:37:49
Comrades Marathon 2011 (Up)	12	5:53:03
Comrades Marathon 2012 (Down)	2	5:32:42
Comrades Marathon 2013 (Up)	DNF	N/A
Comrades Marathon 2014 (Down)	1	5:28:34
Comrades Marathon 2015 (Up)	17	6:05:01
Two Oceans Marathon 2016	13	3:21:39
Comrades Marathon 2016 (Down)	3	5:26:39
IAU 100 km World Championships 2016	2	6:24:06
Two Oceans Marathon 2017	8	3:14:37
Comrades Marathon 2017 (Up)	1	5:35:34
Two Oceans Marathon 2018	5	3:12:09
Comrades Marathon 2018 (Down)	1	5:26:34
IAU 100 km World Championships 2018	3	6:33:47
Two Oceans Marathon 2019	1	3:08:39
Comrades Marathon 2019 (Up)	2	5:31:58
IAU 50 km World Championships 2019	7	2:50:23

== Family ==
Mthembu is the fourth child in a family of seven children—four boys and three girls. His father died in 1997 and they were raised by his mother. He has a son by the name of Sisanda Mthembu.
