= Gerda Steyn =

South African marathon athlete

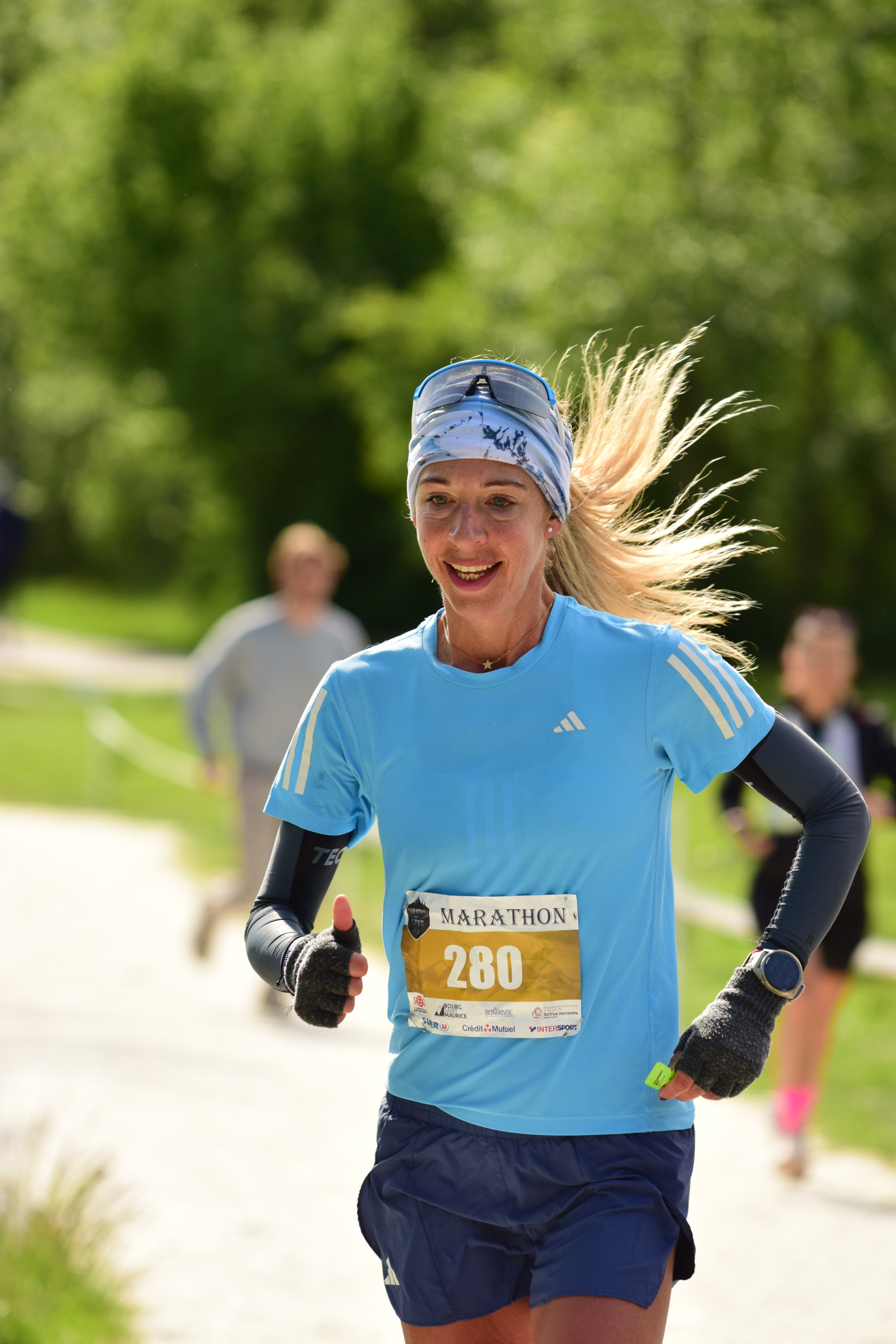
- Gerda Steyn in 2026.

Personal information
- Nationality: South African
- Born: Gerda Steyn; 3 March 1990 (age 36) Bothaville, Free State, South Africa
- Education: University of the Free State
- Occupation: long-distance runner
- Years active: 2014–present

Sport
- Country: South Africa
- Sport: Athletics
- Events: Marathon, Ultramarathon
- Club: Phantane Athletics Club
- Coached by: self coached

Achievements and titles
- Personal bests: 5 km: 15:45 (Kingsley 2020); 10 km: 32:24 (Dubai 2020); Half marathon: 1:10:55 (Ras Al Khaimah 2020); Marathon: 2:24:03 (Valencia Marathon 2023)

Gerda Steyn (born 3 March 1990) is a South African marathon and ultramarathon athlete. She set the down-run record for the 90 km Comrades Marathon in 2023 with a mark of 5:44:54, becoming the fourth woman under 6 hours for that race. She also holds the record for the 56 km Two Oceans Marathon and has won that event 7 consecutive times, starting in 2018.

On 11 April 2021, she became the SA marathon record holder with a time of 2:25:28 at the Xiamen Tuscany Camp Elite Marathon in Siena, Italy. She then broke her own record at the 2023 Valencia marathon, setting a time of 2:24:03. Steyn is a two-time Olympian, competing for South Africa in both the 2020 and 2024 Summer Games.

== Early life ==
Her parents are Pieter and Trudie Steyn. Gerda grew up on a farm in the Bothaville area and completed her schooling in 2008 at the Bothaville High School. Afterwards, she qualified as a quantity surveyor from the University of the Free State. She has a sister and a brother.

== Career ==
In 2014 she went to work in Dubai and joined a running club, where she discovered her talent for running. After completing her first Comrades in 2015, she met 1991 winner Nick Bester who became her coach.

Her first major career victory was in the 2018 Two Oceans Marathon, in a time of 3:39:32.

She won the 2019 Comrades Marathon in a record time of 5 hours, 58 minutes, and 53 seconds, becoming the first woman to complete the uprun in under six hours.

She also won the 2019 Two Oceans Marathon in a time of 3:31:28. She won it for the fifth time in a row in 2024 and broke her course record with a time of 3:26:54.

She competed in the women's marathon at the 2020 Summer Olympics.

Her best time for a standard marathon is the SA record of 2:25:28, achieved in 2021 at the 2021 IAAF Xiamen Tuscany Camp Elite Marathon in Siena, Italy, breaking the previous 25-year-old SA record by more than a minute.

At the 2023 Valencia Marathon, Steyn finished in 11th running a time of 2:24:03 becoming the South African national record holder for the event.

== Results ==
Year	Race	Place	Position	Time
2015	Comrades Marathon	Durban	56th	8:19:08
2016	Two Oceans Marathon	Cape Town	14th	4:15:44
2016	Comrades Marathon	Pietermaritzburg	14th	7:08:23
2017	Comrades Marathon	Durban	4th	6:45:45
2018	Two Oceans Marathon	Cape Town	1st	3:39:32
2018	Comrades Marathon	Pietermaritzburg	2nd	6:15:34
2018	New York Marathon	New York	13th	2:31:04
2019	Two Oceans Marathon	Cape Town	1st	3:31:28
2019	Comrades Marathon	Durban	1st	5:58:53
2019	New York Marathon	New York	11th	2:27:48
2020	London Marathon	London	7th	2:26:51
2021	Nelson Mandela Bay Half Marathon	Port Elizabeth	2nd	1:12:14
2021	Giulietta e Romeo Half Marathon	Verona	4th	1:13:28
2021	Olympic Games	Sapporo	15th	2:32:10
2021	Cape Town Marathon	Cape Town	4th	2:26:25
2022	Two Oceans Marathon	Cape Town	1st	3:29:42
2022	New York Marathon	New York	12th	2:30:22
2023	Two Oceans Marathon	Cape Town	1st	3:29:06
2023	Comrades Marathon	Durban	1st	5:44:54
2023	Valencia Marathon	Valencia	11th	2:24:03
2024	Two Oceans Marathon	Cape Town	1st	3:26:54
2024	Comrades Marathon	Pietermaritzburg	1st	5:49:46
2025	Two Oceans Marathon	Cape Town	1st	3:29:09
2025	Comrades Marathon	Pietermaritzburg	1st	5:51:19
2026	Two Oceans Marathon	Cape Town	1st	3:27:39
2026	Comrades Marathon	Durban	1st	5:44:53
