= London to Brighton road race =

Long-distance running race held on public roads in England

- Date: October
- Location: London-Brighton, United Kingdom
- Event type: Road race
- Distance: 51 miles, 1,607 yards (84.2 km) - 55 miles (88.5 km)
- Established: 1889 (137 years ago)
- Last held: 2005 (21 years ago)
- Course records: Men: 5:15:15 (1980); Ian Thompson; Women: 6:34:10 (1993); Carolyn Hunter-Rowe
- Participants: 60-100

The London to Brighton road race was a competitive running race held on public roads from Westminster Bridge over the river Thames in central London, England, to the south coast resort of Brighton. The route was first covered by a professional pedestrian in 1825, and the first race took place in 1837. The era of open races organised by athletics clubs started in 1899, and in 1903 a newspaper offered significant prize money resulting in a race with almost one hundred starters that brought the event to much wider public notice.

In 1924 an Englishman named Arthur Newton came from Natal in southern Africa specifically to break the record for the journey, and thirteen years later he mentored a South African named Hardy Ballington to break his own record. In 1951 a race was organised as part of the Festival of Britain, and the following year that became an annual event organised by the Road Runners Club. The first woman to cover the route was Dale Greig of Tannahill Harriers in 1972, and women's races started unofficially in 1979 and officially in 1980.

Competitors came not just from England but also from Canada, Eire, New Zealand, Scotland, South Africa, Switzerland, and the United States. The distance of the race varied over the years so that the fastest time may not necessarily be the best performance. For the men, the fastest time was recorded by Alastair Wood of Aberdeen who ran 5 h 11 min 2 s in 1972, while the best performance is 5 h 15 min 15 s by Ian Thompson of Luton United Athletic Club in 1980 when the course measured 54 miles 460 yards (87.3 km). For the women the shortest time is the best performance since Carolyn Hunter-Rowe's 6 h 34 min 10 s in 1993 was achieved over the longest version of the course when it measured 55 miles (88.5 km).

Advances in the volume and speed of traffic on the roads made it increasingly difficult to provide for the safety of both competitors and officials, and harder to recruit appropriate numbers of volunteer marshalls, and the race was last held in 2005. In 1921 Surrey Athletic Club organised a 10-stage relay run over the route and in 1924 this became an open race that was held annually until 1966 when the sponsor withdrew.

== History ==
The first man to run between London and Brighton was the, "celebrated runner" Tomlinson, who made a match for 100 guineas that he could go from "the extremity of Brighton," to the Quadrant Coffee House, Regent Street, London, in less than ten hours. On Monday 19 December 1825 he covered the first 20 miles (32.1 km) in a few minutes less than three hours, and after 26 miles (41.8 km) he stopped and had a short nap on some straw in a covered van that accompanied him. He got to the top of Reigate Hill, 31 miles (49.8 km), in 4 h 30 min, stopped at Tooting for half-an-hour for a mutton-chop supper and won the match with a leisurely ten minutes to spare.

The first foot race took place in January 1837 between two professional pedestrians, Jack Berry from Lancashire and John Townsend, whose father was the town crier at Lewes. Their match was a go-as-you-please event with the men allowed to walk or run as they desired, but they were required to stick to the highway through Sutton, Reigate, Crawley, and Hickstead, and were each trailed by two umpires in a buggy to ensure fair play. The first to touch the railings of St Peter's Church, Brighton, would be the winner. The church is on the edge of an open park called The Level and is around eleven hundred yards (1 km) short of the sea front. They started from the Elephant and Castle, Blackfriars Road, London, with Townsend given a twenty-minute head start due to his age. Berry started at twenty-three minutes past eight in the morning of Monday 30 January 1837. The weather was not good. Only three weeks earlier a snow storm had closed the Brighton road for four days, and on the day it was windy and after an hour of the race a cold drizzle started that turned to sleet on the tops of hills. Berry got to the Swan Inn at Reigate in 1 h 36 min just four minutes behind Townsend, but then stopped for fifteen minutes for refreshments and to change his clothes. Berry passed Townsend at Hookwood Common, on the border of Surrey and Sussex (28 miles, 45 km), and ran non-stop to the thirty-third milestone (53 km), where he started to suffer cramps in his feet and was forced to walk. Townsend's more modest start and even pace saw him overtake Berry outside Patcham and he ran into Brighton to find Berry had beaten him to it. By the windmill at Patcham Berry had retired and ridden a barouche into town to witness the finish. Townsend was greeted by a numerous crowd that one newspaper described as "half of Brighton," gathered in the road to cheer and applaud, and touched the church railings in 8 h 37 min. (Note: The time was reported as 8:32 in the Monmouthshire Merlin, 8:35 in the Brighton Gazette, and 8:37 in Bell's Life. The Road Runners Club History of the London to Brighton gives 8:37.)

In 1899 South London Harriers organised an open go-as-you-please race that started from the clock tower on the Middlesex side of Westminster Bridge, and finished at Bell's Baths by the Aquarium at Brighton. It was scheduled to start at 7 o'clock in the morning of Saturday 6 May, but there was a slight delay and the starter, Harry Venn of London Athletic Club, did not get them going until fourteen minutes later. The race had created a lot of excitement in athletic circles and there was a sizeable crowd to see them off despite the early hour. There were nineteen entries from ten different running clubs, mostly across south London, but also one from Bexhill near Hastings and one from the Isle of Wight. The weather was fine, with clear skies, and warm, with a slight north-easterly breeze, as near perfect as could have been hoped. Each runner was accompanied by a cyclist, and arrangements had been made for refreshments to be available for competitors at several hotels along the route.

The lead was taken by E. Gavin (South London H.), with a group of four close together some distance behind. By Croydon (11 miles, 17.3 km) Gavin had a lead of some 200 yards (182 m) but then retired from the race. The group of four were still together at 15 miles (24.1 km) reached in 1 h 50 min 10 s, but by Redhill (20 miles, 33 km) Frederick Randall (Finchley H.) had opened a gap of 80 yards (73 m). Randall had predicted the coming of social media, and arranged for telegrams with details of his progress to be sent to The Plough Inn, Turkey Street, Enfield, for the benefit of his friends. As they progressed the group stretched out and at one point Randall was over a mile (1.6 km) in the lead, but the hills began to take their toll and he had to stop and walk several times allowing the second man, W. Saward (Essex Beagles) to get within two minutes of him.

Roads into Brighton were thronged with people cheering them on and there were so many cyclists accompanying the leader that his progress could be seen from a distance by the clouds of dust. When Randall crossed the line after 6 h 58 min 18 s he was hoisted aloft and carried to the carriage waiting to take him to the Baths. "Thank God it's over," he said.

The starters included Edward Knott of South London Harriers, who had won a walking race over the same route in 1897 and held the current walking record for the trip, 8 h 56 min 44 s, but he was among those who did not finish, and arrived in Brighton by train for the dinner in the evening for the presentation of the prizes, tickets three shillings each. The winner received a silver bowl on a plinth, and a gold medal. The next three all received a silver bowl. Second-placed W. Saward (Essex Beagles) also received a silver medal for breaking 7 h 30 min, and the next four finishers all received a bronze medal for beating 8 h 15 min.

In February 1903 two professional pedestrians, Dave Fenton and Tom Gowan, independently wrote to the press to suggest that if some "gentleman sportsman" would put up a suitable purse or arrange a sweepestake they would be prepared to attack the record for the journey. This prompted The Evening News to announce two races, a walk and a run for both amateurs and professionals. Sporting authorities pointed out that the rules prevented amateurs from competing alongside professionals and the arrangements were amended to a go-as-you-please race open to the whole world, a walk for invited professionals, and an amateur walk.

The considerable sum of fifty guineas was offered as first prize in the go-as-you-please, with 10 guineas for second, 5 guineas for third, and £1 for each of the next fifteen finishers. The foreign champions the public were promised didn't materialise but there were almost one hundred men on the start line at 5 o'clock on the morning of Saturday 20 June 1903. Among them was W. Saward of Essex Beagles who had finished second to Frederick Randall in the 1899 race, and Leonard Hurst, a well-known professional runner, cyclist, and pedestrian who had twice won the Paris marathon, won the world 25-mile (40.2 km) championship and a 6-day walk in New York.

A group of four went off at the start but Hurst, wearing a light blue jersey and white knee-length shorts, hung back and waited in a larger group, eventually moving to the front as they passed through Purley. He was never seriously challenged from that point and won by more than thirty eight minutes in 6 h 34 min 50 s. The first seven finishers were inside eight hours.

In January 1914 Charles Hart became the first man to run from London to Brighton and back. Starting from the Aquarium, Brighton, shortly before half past three on the afternoon of Sunday 25 January, he ran to Westminster Bridge in 8 h 44 min, turned round and ran back to Brighton, arriving there at quarter past one on Monday afternoon, he took a half hour break then ran back to London, completing the triple-journey in 34 h 37 min. Sporting Life said, "there is no performance on the road with which this can be compared." At that time the world record for the comparable distance of 156 miles (251 km) on the track was 26 h 40 min 15 s by J. Hughes at New York in 1882 and the walking record was 31 h 50 min 42 s, by George Littlewood in a six-day walk at Sheffield also in 1882.

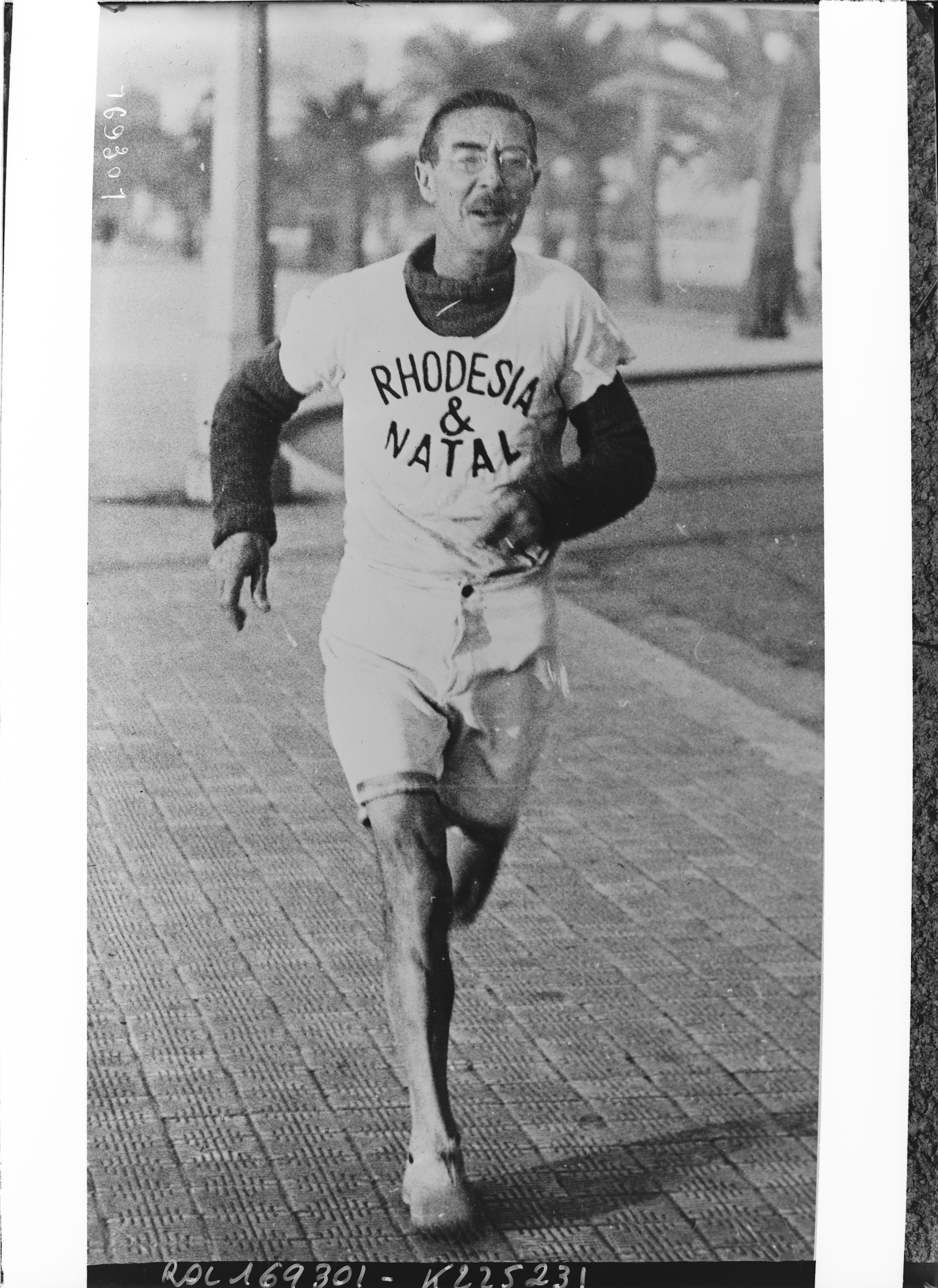
Arthur Newton at the age of 49, running in Natal.

Arthur Newton was an English man who had emigrated to South Africa where he owned a farm. In 1924, at the age of 41, he returned to England to air a grievance he had about the way the English were being treated in Natal, and he chose to do this through running. He had already twice won the 55 miles (88 km) Comrades Marathon in South Africa, beating the previous record by over two hours. On Friday 3 October 1924 he staged a deliberate attack on Len Hurst's record for the Brighton run. Running on his own with Len Hurst watching from a following car, he reached Redhill (20 miles, 32.1 km) in 2 h 6 min 5 s, Hickstead Castle (40 miles, 64.3 km) in 4 h 37 min 6 s, and crossed the finish line in Brighton in 6 h 11 min 4 2/5 s to huge applause from a very appreciative crowd. It was later described as, "one of the most remarkable long distance runs in history."

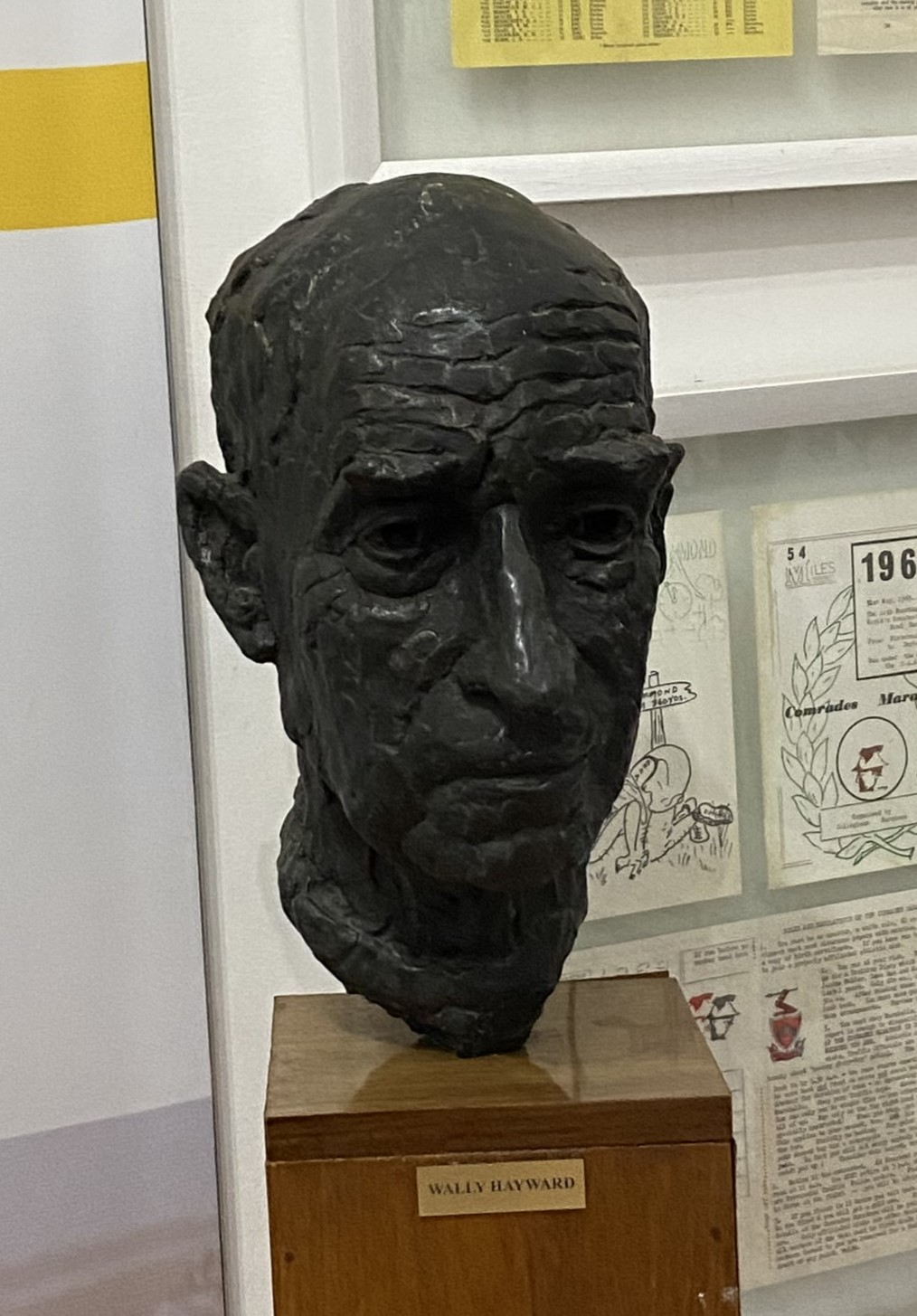
A bust of Wally Hayward, winner of the 1953 race, displayed in the museum of the Comrades Marathon, Pietermaritzburg, South Africa.

Not satisfied with this performance, he came back less than six weeks later, on Thursday 13 November, and had another go. This time the weather was not quite so congenial and he had to battle against drizzling rain and a head wind the whole way, but beat his own record by more than 17 minutes and recorded 5 h 53 min 43 s, revising the world record for 50 miles (80.4 km) en route.

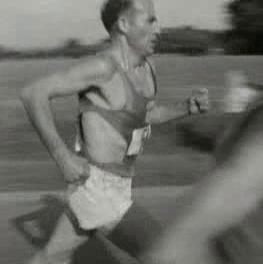
Tom Richards (South London H.), winner of the 1955 race, running in the Enschede marathon in 1951.

That record lasted for thirteen years, and the man who beat it actually came from South Africa, and used Arthur Newton's training methods. In 1937 Hardy Ballington from Durban, South Africa, was twenty-four years old. He had won the Comrades Marathon three times, beating the course record for both the up and down races, and he was being coached by post by Arthur Newton, who was in England. So the members of Durban Athletic Club got up a subscription to send the diminutive Ballington to London for the specific purpose of attacking Arthur Newton's record on the Brighton road. He arrived in England on 19 April and met Newton for the first time at Waterloo Station.

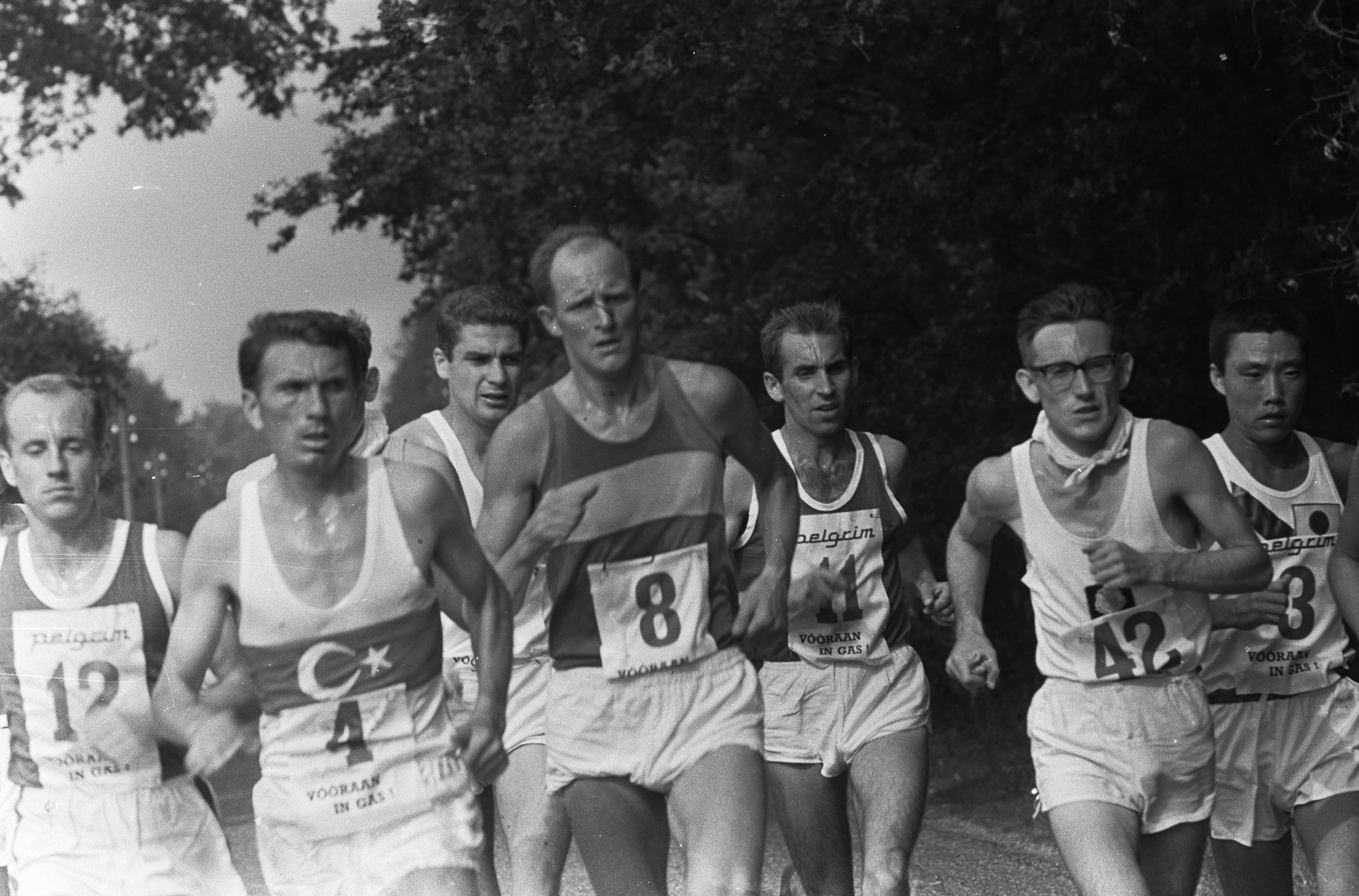
John Newsome (42) winner of the 1974 race, running in the Enschede marathon in 1967.

Eight men lined up for the start on the morning of Saturday 22 May and at first the conditions were good, but after the leaders, Ballington and J. H. Chapman, reached the Greyhound at Croydon (10 miles, 16.0 km) in 1 h 3 min 45 s it started to rain and a strong south-west wind got up. By 20 miles (32.1 km) Ballington was exactly five minutes behind Newton's schedule in 2 h 9 min 15 s. Encouraged by Newton from a following car Ballington worked hard and by Crawley (31 miles 1,408 yards, 51.1 km) he was forty-nine seconds ahead of schedule. At Pyecombe, the top of Dale Hill, he was 7 min 4 s ahead of Newton's schedule and he slowed down to conserve his resources. He set new figures of 5 h 33 min 15 s for 50 miles (80.4 km) and cutting it remarkably close beat Newton's record for the full distance by exactly one second.

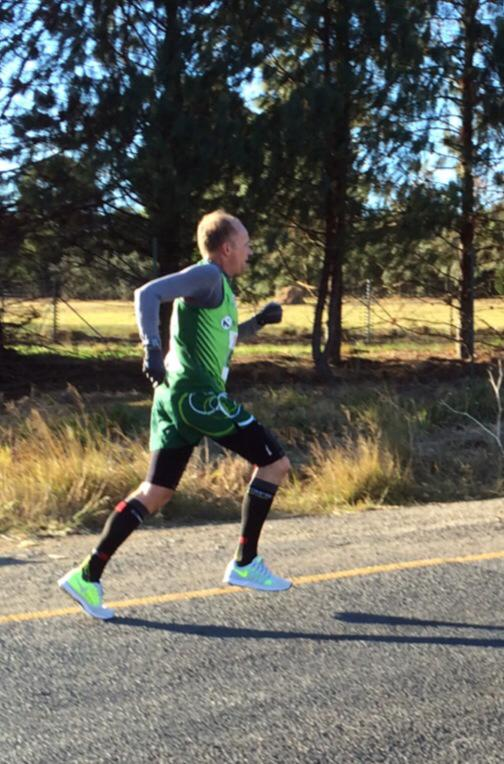
Shaun Meiklejohn, winner of the 1994 race, competing in the Mandela Marathon 2014.

In August 1951, as part of the Festival of Britain, Surbiton Town Sports Club wanted to stage a road race from London to Brighton with the specific aim of challenging Hardy Ballington's course record from 1937. Ernest Neville of the Surrey Walking Club had been organising walking races from London to Brighton since 1902, and in 1948 organised a 24-hour track race for the Surbiton Town Sports Club, so they asked him to organise their road race. The race was sponsored by the News-Chronicle, and forty-seven men faced the starter on Westminster Bridge, but the weather was not conducive to record breaking and the winner, a 40-year-old insurance clerk, Lewis Piper of Blackheath Harriers, recorded 6 h 18 min 40 s, over two minutes ahead of second-placed J. Crossley of Rochdale.

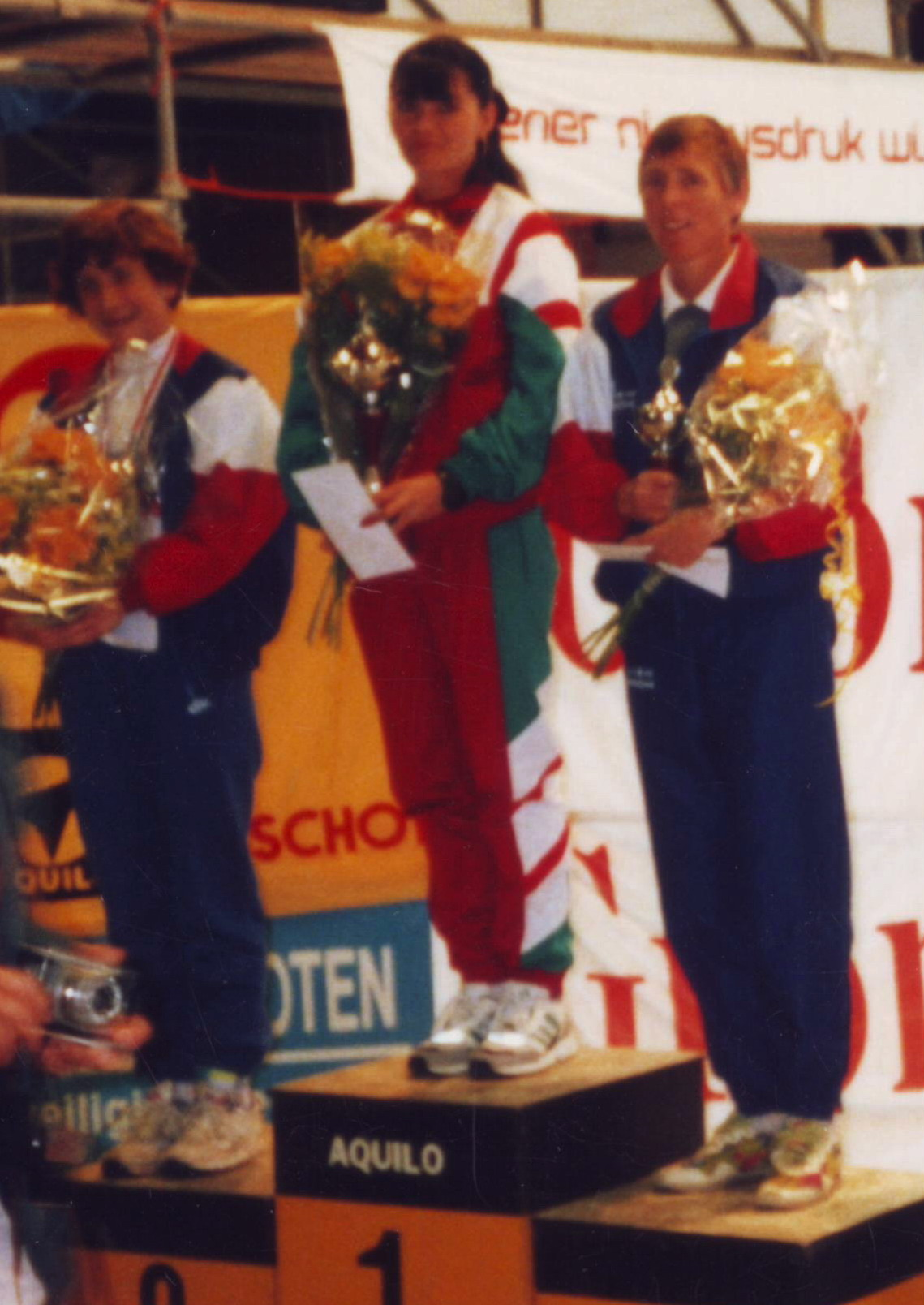
Hilary Walker (left) and Eleanor Robinson (right), winners of the 1988 and 1986 races respectively, on the podium at the IAU European Championships, 1993.

The 1951 race made it more widely known that running from London to Brighton was not reserved solely for outrageously talented professionals, but that Brighton was within reach of a well-trained marathon runner. The following year Ernest Neville founded the Road Runners Club, and they took on the role of organising an annual London to Brighton road race with their first race held in September 1952. The winner was Derek Reynolds, a 30-year-old insurance clerk and a member of Blackheath Harriers, in 5 h 52 min 22 s. The winner was presented the Arthur Newton Cup, and Newton himself presented this perpetual trophy to its first winner.

In 1953 Len Hurst's widow presented the Road Runners Club a magnificent gold and silver belt her husband had won in a 10-mile professional handicap race at Bow on Boxing Day 1902, to be used as a trophy for the team winners of their annual London to Brighton race. Rex Cross as president accepted the belt on behalf of the club, and then handed it back to Caroline Hurst for her to present it to the first winners, Blackheath Harriers. In 2005 when the race was held for the last time, the belt was presented to Crawley Athletics Club, who had won it the most number of times, and they in turn presented it to Crawley Museum. (Note: Several sources have claimed that the Len Hurst Belt was won by him at the London to Brighton road race of 1903. For example, in Lore of Running (2001) by Tim Noakes on p. 366 it says, "his achievements are commemorated each year with the award to the winning team in the London-to-Brighton race of the Len Hurst Belt, believed to have been won by Hurst in that race in 1903." Prizes for the 1903 race are listed in the Evening News (London), Thu 18 Jun 1903 p. 2, published two days before the race. The Evening News itself offered a very generous fifty guineas for first place, ten guineas for second place, five guineas for third, and prizes of one pound to each of the next fifteen runners to finish. In addition, several businesses offered prizes: Gamages, the outfitters, of Holborn, offered a rebate of 5 shillings to every runner wearing their boots who finished in them. A Croydon butcher, Tudor and Co., of the Grand Parade, offered a York ham to the first competitor to pass their shop. The Palatine Rubber Company offered five pounds to the first man to finish wearing a Palatine Revolving Rubber Heel Pad. The Wawkphar Co., makers of British and Indian Military Strengthening Foot Powder, offered five pounds and a case of six-dozen sixpenny tins of their foot powder to the winner, provided he used their product during the race. Mr. J. E. Garratt, of 124, Southwark-street, London, offered five pounds to the first competitor to reach the winning-post with New Skin on his feet. New Skin was a liquid preparation for preventing blisters and soreness. There is no mention of a belt. The belt was won by Hurst in a 10-mile professional handicap at Bow Old Grounds on Friday 26 December 1902. The race was organised by Tom O'Connor, and featured sixteen of the top professional distance runners in England at that time, including Bob Hallen the American champion. Hurst ran from scratch, and won by twenty yards. Tom Jackson, who finished second, started four laps (1,083 yards) in front of Hurst. see: Sporting Life, Sat 27 Dec 1902 p. 8 and Athletics Weekly, 23 May 1953 p. 4.)

Due to the similarity of the event to the Comrades Marathon in South Africa, and the connection with Arthur Newton and Hardy Ballington, athletes from South Africa entered in increasing numbers, won the event several times, set records and won the team prize, until 1976 when South Africa were expelled from the IAAF (now known as World Athletics). The first South African winner was Wally Hayward of Germiston Callies, in 1953, who also set an unofficial world road best for 50 miles (80.4 km) of 5 h 14 min 22 s to replace the figures established by Hardy Ballington in 1937.

But it was not just South Africans that came; in 1967, the first time the event was held on a Sunday, in addition to the usual English men there were starters from Canada, Eire, Scotland, South Africa, Switzerland, the United States and Roger Alcorn from New Zealand finished second. In 1976 the team prize was won by the Millrose Athletic Association from New York. By that time it was sufficiently popular that the Road Runners Club had to impose entry qualifications, limiting entry to athletes who had demonstrated the ability to finish in less than eight and a half hours.

In 1971, the 21st annual open race was won by 21-year-old Dave Levick of Witwatersrand University from a field of 66 starters. The following year Scottish marathon runner Alastair Wood (Aberdeen AC) beat 58 others to Brighton in 5 h 11 min 2 s, making the single largest improvement in the record since 1953 and becoming the first man to run from London to Brighton at an average speed of more than 10 miles per hour (16.0 kmh). Mick Orton (Tipton H.) also beat the previous record in finishing second but was over eight minutes behind Wood, who three months later celebrated his fortieth birthday. A record number of 94 starters contested the event in 1974, when John Newsome (Wakefield H. & AC) beat Cavin Woodward (Leamington AC) by just six seconds and the first twelve men finished inside six hours.

Bernard Gomersall (Leeds Harehills) holds the record for consecutive wins, with four from 1963 to 1966, and with a total of four wins shares with Stephen Moore (Hertford & Ware AC) the record for the most number of wins overall.

The first woman to run from London to Brighton was Dale Greig of Tannahill Harriers, who started one hour in front of the men's race in 1972 and finished in 8 h 30 min 4 s. At the prize giving dinner in the evening she was presented with a special award and given a standing ovation. At the same time Ernest Neville announced his retirement from the role of race organiser, and the Mayor of Brighton presented him with a souvenir of Brighton to mark his seven decades association with events on the Brighton road. In 1979 three women participated unofficially, the first to finish being Leslie Watson of London Olympidaes in 6 h 55 min 11 s, and the following year she also won the first official women's race in 6 h 56 min 10 s. The Northern Rock Trophy presented to the winner of the lady's race was named after its sponsors, the Northern Rock Building Society.

Hilary Walker holds the records for the most wins and the most consecutive wins in the women's race. She finished fourth in the women's race in 1985, third in 1986, then won it three years in succession from 1988 and added two more in 1996 and 1999. In 1988 in Blackpool she set a women's world record for 48-hours that remained the British record until 2023. She also served as president of Serpentine running club, as general secretary of the International Association of Ultrarunners, and has been inducted into the Ultrarunning Hall of Fame.

The distance of the race varied from a low of 51 miles 1,607 yards (83.5 km) to a maximum of 55 miles (88.5 km), which means that the lowest time may not be the best performance. For the men the lowest time recorded was the 5 h 11 min 2 s by Alastair Wood of Aberdeen in 1972 when the course measured 52 miles 1,172 yards (84.7 km). Allowing for these differences the best performance is 5 h 15 min 15 s by Ian Thompson in 1980 when the course measured 54 miles 460 yards (87.3 km). This is equivalent to running two 2:32 marathons back to back. For the women, however, the fastest time is also the best performance, Carolyn Hunter-Rowe's 6 h 34 min 10 s in 1993 was achieved over the longest version of the course when it measured 55 miles (88.5 km).

In July 1954, Derek Reynolds of Blackheath Harriers won the only known race from London to Brighton and back in 14 h 54 min 59 s. The only other finisher, of nine starters, was L. Pocock in 15 h 22 min 6 s.

== News of the World relay ==
Edward F. Vowles of Surrey Athletic Club conceived of the idea of a team relay to be run on the Brighton road, with ten men covering an average of 5 miles (8 km) each he estimated that they should be able to reach Brighton in around four and a half hours. This was first held as a test of concept on Wednesday 16 February 1921, starting from Westminster Bridge they ran to the Aquarium at Brighton in 4 h 39 min 44 s. As an event it was deemed a huge success but the cost of organising it and the organisation involved with transporting runners to their respective handover points made it seem unlikely that it would ever become an open race. In 1902 Joe Binks was Amateur Athletic Association 1 mile champion and British record holder at the distance but by 1921 he was a correspondent for the News of the World and he persuaded the newspaper to sponsor the event. The first actual race was held in January 1924 with sixteen invited teams facing the starter. This was over a slightly different course and took a little longer, 4 h 50 min, with the winners again being Surrey AC. The following year the start was moved to April to get better weather, and invitations spread further than just southern teams and the race was won by Birchfield Harriers in 4 h 50 min 52 s. This then became an annual event that attracted the top teams in the country and by 1939 Birchfield Harriers had won it five times, Mitcham Athletic Club won it three times in succession, and Belgrave Harriers had posted the best time of 4 h 37 min 55 s in winning the 1936 edition on a course advertised as 54 miles 1,232 yards (88.0 km).

The event was not without controversy, however. The 1936 edition saw a fatality as a runner collided with a car on the leg from Duxhurst to Crawley. A St John Ambulance took the runner to hospital but G. Young, a 28-year-old insurance agent and a member of Queen's Park Harriers on his fourth London to Brighton relay, was found to be dead on arrival. Another runner was also knocked down but was not seriously injured and continued his run. Young's colleagues completed the run even though they were technically eliminated. Adverse comments in the press included that, "It seems extremely doubtful whether the roads nowadays are fit places for contests of this kind."

When the war intervened it seemed unlikely that the event would continue but in 1940 the teams organised a substitute to be run around Wimbledon Common. Twenty-eight teams entered, with eight men per team, running one lap of the common, around 4 1/4 miles (6.8 km) each. Belgrave Harriers were comfortable winners in 2 h 57 min 8 s. The relay proper, still sponsored by the News of the World, resumed in April 1947, on a course measured at "46 odd miles" (74 km). The first post-war winners were Belgrave Harriers in 4 h 3 min 19 s. Belgrave repeated the feat of winning it three times in succession with a best time of 3 h 57 min 29 s in 1948.

The next development was that in 1950 it was decided that rather than invite teams to take part there would be regional qualifying relays held in April and a National final held in September or October. So in April 1950 the News of the World Relay for Southern clubs was won by Thames Valley Harriers in 3 h 54 min 10 s. In response to the traffic pressure the start had been moved to the News of the World Sports Ground at Mitcham so the route was now quite a bit shorter, around 44 miles 528 yards (71.2 km), and winners now regularly finished in under four hours.

However, in September of that year there was a meeting of many interested parties to thrash out details of the cross country season, and it was generally agreed that the focus in the winter should be on preparation for the National Cross Country Championship and the relay season should stay where it had traditionally always been, March and April. As a result, the national final of the News of the World relay was switched back to April, the event planned for September 1950 never happened and the only News of the World relay that year was the southern qualifier. From 1951 the April event was called the News of the World National London to Brighton Road Relay, and the southern clubs held their qualifying event in late September or early October. From 1954 it became an 11-stage relay, then from 1957 when the route had to be changed due to work at Gatwick Airport it became a 12-stage relay. The best post-war time for the 10-stage relay is 3 h 48 min 34 s by Belgrave Harriers in 1952, and the record for the 11-stage relay is 4 h 25 min 51 s by South London Harriers on 13 April 1957.

In 1965 the Southern qualifier was held over a new course on Wimbledon Common in a race organised by Belgrave Harriers, that was won by the host club in 4 h 8 min 20 s, with Portsmouth AC in second place and Ealing Harriers in third place.

Then in February 1966 the News of the World announced that they would no longer be able to sponsor the relay, no other sponsor came along to take it over and the race ended. The editor of Athletics Weekly said: "The London to Brighton Relay was the Blue Riband of road relay racing. To many this event was the greatest on the athletics calendar. ... Whatever can be arranged to take its place, the year's athletics will never be quite the same again. It is the end of an era, with memories which will never be erased and rank with anything else we have seen in athletics in this country."

The last winners of the News of the World London to Brighton Relay were Coventry Godiva Harriers, their third consecutive win, in 4 h 26 min 11 s, on Saturday 10 April 1965. The club that won it the most was Belgrave Harriers with seven wins in two streaks, 1934-35-36, and 1947-48-49-51, which is technically a streak because there was no national in 1950. Birchfield Harriers won it six times, 1925-26-28-30-31-52. The best time over the last iteration of the course was put up by Coventry Godiva Harriers in 1964 when they ran 4 h 19 min 34 s.

Thames Valley Harriers (1950-55-56-57-60) and Portsmouth Athletic Club (1958-59-61-62-64) tied for five wins each in the Southern relay, and Portsmouth also put up the best time of 4 h 27 min 4 s on 13 October 1964.

== Performance progression ==
Progression of London to Brighton Best Performance (Running)
| Time | Athlete (affiliation) | Date | Distance |
|---|---|---|---|
| 8:37:00 | John Townsend (pedestrian) | 30 Jan 1837 | |
| 6:58:18 | Frederick D. Randall (Finchley H.) | 6 May 1899 | |
| 6:34:50 | Leonard Hurst (professional) | 20 Jun 1903 | |
| 6:11:04 | Arthur Newton | 3 Oct 1924 | 51 miles, 1607 yards (83.5 km) |
| 5:53:43 | Arthur Newton | 13 Nov 1924 | 51 miles, 1607 yards (83.5 km) |
| 5:53:42 | Hardy Ballington (Durban AC, RSA) | 22 May 1937 | 51 miles, 1737 yards (83.6 km) |
| 5:52:22 | Derek E. Reynolds (Blackheath H.) | 27 Sep 1952 | 52 miles, 566 yards (84.2 km) |
| 5:29:40 | Wally Hayward (Germiston Callies, RSA) | 26 Sep 1953 | 52 miles, 566 yards (84.2 km) |
| 5:27:24 | Tom Richards (South London H.) | 24 Sep 1955 | 52 miles, 566 yards (84.2 km) |
| 5:26:20 | Gerald Walsh (Durban AC, RSA) | 28 Sep 1957 | 52 miles, 876 yards (84.4 km) |
| 5:25:56 | Jackie Mekler (Germiston Callies, RSA) | 24 Sep 1960 | 52 miles, 876 yards (84.4 km) |
| 5:21:45 | David Levick (Witwatersrand Un., RSA) | 26 Sep 1971 | 52 miles, 1172 yards (84.7 km) |
| 5:11:02 | Alastair J. Wood (Aberdeen AC) | 1 Oct 1972 | 52 miles, 1172 yards (84.7 km) |
| 5:13:02 | Donald Ritchie (Forres H.) | 1 Oct 1978 | 53 miles, 856 yards (86.0 km) |
| 5:15:15 | Ian Thompson (Luton United AC) | 28 Sep 1980 | 54 miles, 460 yards (87.3 km) |

Progression of London to Brighton Best Performance (Running, Women)
| Time | Athlete (affiliation) | Date | Distance |
|---|---|---|---|
| 8:30:04 | Dale Greig (Tannahill Harriers) | 1 Oct 1972 | 52 miles, 1172 yards (84.7 km) |
| 6:55:11 | Leslie Watson (London Olympiades AC) | 30 Sep 1979 | 54 miles, 460 yards (87.3 km) |
| 6:37:08 | Ann Franklin (Mynyddwr de Cymru) | 25 Sep 1983 | 53 miles, 1082 yards (86.2 km) |
| 6:34:10 | Carolyn Hunter-Rowe (Pudsey & Bramley AC) | 3 Oct 1993 | 55 miles (88.5 km) |

Top Twenty Best Performances - Men
| Time | Athlete (affiliation) | Pos. | Date | Distance | Speed (kmh) |
|---|---|---|---|---|---|
| 5:15:15 | Ian Thompson (Luton United AC) | 1 | 28 Sep 1980 | 54 miles 460 yards (87.3 km) | 16.62 |
| 5:12:32 | Bruce Fordyce (Witwatersrand Un., RSA) | 1 | 25 Sep 1983 | 53 miles 1,082 yards (86.3 km) | 16.565 |
| 5:13:02 | Donald Ritchie (Forres H.) | 1 | 01 Oct 1978 | 53 miles 856 yards (86.1 km) | 16.499 |
| 5:11:02 | Alastair J. Wood (Aberdeen AC) | 1 | 01 Oct 1972 | 52 miles 1,172 yards (84.8 km) | 16.35 |
| 5:11:30 | Joe Keating (Ealing & Southall AC) | 1 | 30 Sep 1973 | 52 miles 1,172 yards (84.8 km) | 16.326 |
| 5:12:07 | Cavin Woodward (Leamington C. & AC) | 1 | 28 Sep 1975 | 52 miles 1,172 yards (84.8 km) | 16.293 |
| 5:21:55 | Allan Kirik (Central Park Track Club, USA) | 2 | 28 Sep 1980 | 54 miles 460 yards (87.3 km) | 16.276 |
| 5:18:30 | Cavin Woodward (Leamington C. & AC) | 2 | 01 Oct 1978 | 53 miles 856 yards (86.1 km) | 16.216 |
| 5:18:36 | Bruce Fordyce (Witwatersrand Un., RSA) | 1 | 26 Sep 1982 | 53 miles 856 yards (86.1 km) | 16.211 |
| 5:16:05 | Donald Ritchie (Forres H.) | 1 | 25 Sep 1977 | 52 miles 1,568 yards (85.1 km) | 16.158 |
| 5:16:07 | John V. Newsome (Wakefield H. & AC) | 1 | 29 Sep 1974 | 52 miles 1,172 yards (84.8 km) | 16.087 |
| 5:16:13 | Cavin Woodward (Leamington C. & AC) | 2 | 29 Sep 1974 | 52 miles 1,172 yards (84.8 km) | 16.082 |
| 5:21:15 | Bruce Fordyce (Witwatersrand Un., RSA) | 1 | 27 Sep 1981 | 53 miles 856 yards (86.1 km) | 16.077 |
| 5:16:36 | Cavin Woodward (Leamington C. & AC) | 2 | 30 Sep 1973 | 52 miles 1,172 yards (84.8 km) | 16.063 |
| 5:23:29 | Graeme Fraser (Hillcrest Villagers AC, RSA) | 2 | 25 Sep 1983 | 53 miles 1,082 yards (86.3 km) | 16.004 |
| 5:19:47 | Robert Heron (Brighton & Hove AC) | 2 | 25 Sep 1977 | 52 miles 1,568 yards (85.1 km) | 15.971 |
| 5:24:23 | Donald Ritchie (Forres H.) | 3 | 25 Sep 1983 | 53 miles 1,082 yards (86.3 km) | 15.96 |
| 5:19:28 | Mick Orton (Tipton Harriers) | 2 | 01 Oct 1972 | 52 miles 1,172 yards (84.8 km) | 15.919 |
| 5:24:55 | Mark Pickard (Epsom & Ewell H.) | 2 | 27 Sep 1981 | 53 miles 856 yards (86.1 km) | 15.895 |
| 5:24:15 | Barry Heath (Royal Marines) | 1 | 07 Oct 1984 | 53 miles 540 yards (85.8 km) | 15.875 |

Top Twenty Best Performances - Women
| Time | Athlete (affiliation) | Pos. | Date | Distance | Speed (kmh) |
|---|---|---|---|---|---|
| 6:34:10 | Carolyn Hunter-Rowe (Pudsey & Bramley AC) | 1 | 03 Oct 1993 | 55 miles (88.5 km) | 13.474 |
| 6:37:08 | Ann Franklin (Mynyddwr de Cymru) | 1 | 25 Sep 1983 | 53 miles 1,082 yards (86.3 km) | 13.036 |
| 6:42:40 | Eleanor Robinson (Sutton-in-Ashfield AC) | 1 | 05 Oct 1986 | 53 miles 540 yards (85.8 km) | 12.783 |
| 6:43:22 | Hilary Walker (Serpentine Running Club) | 1 | 08 Oct 1989 | 53 miles 495 yards (85.7 km) | 12.755 |
| 6:55:11 | Leslie Watson (London Olympiades AC) | 1 | 30 Sep 1979 | 54 miles 460 yards (87.3 km) | 12.62 |
| 6:56:10 | Leslie Watson (London Olympiades AC) | 1 | 28 Sep 1980 | 54 miles 460 yards (87.3 km) | 12.59 |
| 7:02:26 | Ina Sanders (Rand Athletic Club, RSA) | 1 | 04 Oct 1998 | 55 miles (88.5 km) | 12.572 |
| 6:51:24 | Hilary Walker (Serpentine Running Club) | 1 | 07 Oct 1990 | 53 miles 495 yards (85.7 km) | 12.506 |
| 7:05:56 | Rae Bisschoff (Rocky Road Runners, RSA) | 1 | 05 Oct 1997 | 55 miles (88.5 km) | 12.469 |
| 7:06:22 | Jackie Leak (Chiltern Harriers) | 1 | 02 Oct 1994 | 55 miles (88.5 km) | 12.456 |
| 7:07:12 | Danielle Sanderson (Watford Harriers) | 1 | 01 Oct 2000 | 55 miles (88.5 km) | 12.432 |
| 7:02:27 | Ellen McCurtin (Millrose AAC, USA) | 1 | 05 Oct 2003 | 54 miles 194 yards (87.1 km) | 12.368 |
| 6:56:59 | Marianne Savage (Centurion Road Runners) | 2 | 08 Oct 1989 | 53 miles 495 yards (85.7 km) | 12.338 |
| 7:11:39 | Lesley Turner (Rowheath Harriers) | 1 | 01 Oct 1995 | 55 miles (88.5 km) | 12.304 |
| 7:01:51 | Ann Franklin (Mynyddwr de Cymru) | 1 | 26 Sep 1982 | 53 miles 856 yards (86.1 km) | 12.243 |
| 7:02:37 | Sandra Kiddy (Palm Springs, USA) | 1 | 06 Oct 1985 | 53 miles 540 yards (85.8 km) | 12.18 |
| 7:16:24 | Karen Bradford (Varsity Old Boys RC, RSA) | 2 | 01 Oct 2000 | 55 miles (88.5 km) | 12.17 |
| 7:18:09 | Carolyn Hunter-Rowe (Pudsey & Bramley AC) | 1 | 06 Oct 1991 | 55 miles (88.5 km) | 12.121 |
| 7:07:48 | Hilary Walker (Serpentine Running Club) | 1 | 09 Oct 1988 | 53 miles 495 yards (85.7 km) | 12.026 |
| 7:10:36 | Celia Hargrave (Stone Master Marathoners) | 2 | 25 Sep 1983 | 53 miles 1,082 yards (86.3 km) | 12.023 |

== Winners ==
Winners of the London to Brighton Road Race (Men)
| Date | Athlete (Affiliation) | Time h:mm:ss | Distance | Source |
|---|---|---|---|---|
| 30 Jan 1837 | John Townsend (pedestrian) | 8:37:00 | | |
| 6 May 1899 | Frederick D. Randall (Finchley H.) | 6:58:18 | | |
| 20 Jun 1903 | Leonard Hurst (professional) | 6:34:50 | | |
| 3 Oct 1924 | Arthur Newton | 6:11:04 | 51 miles 1,607 yards (83.5 km) | |
| 13 Nov 1924 | Arthur Newton | 5:53:43 | 51 miles 1,607 yards (83.5 km) | |
| 22 May 1937 | Hardy Ballington (Durban AC, RSA) | 5:53:42 | 51 miles 1,737 yards (83.7 km) | |
| 18 Aug 1951 | Lewis E. Piper (Blackheath H.) | 6:18:40 | 52 miles 566 yards (84.2 km) | |
| 27 Sep 1952 | Derek E. Reynolds (Blackheath H.) | 5:52:22 | 52 miles 566 yards (84.2 km) | |
| 26 Sep 1953 | Wally Hayward (Germiston Callies H., RSA) | 5:29:40 | 52 miles 566 yards (84.2 km) | |
| 25 Sep 1954 | William H. Kelly (Reading AC) | 5:39:46 | 52 miles 566 yards (84.2 km) | |
| 24 Sep 1955 | Tom Richards (South London H.) | 5:27:24 | 52 miles 566 yards (84.2 km) | |
| 29 Sep 1956 | Ron F. Hopcroft (Thames Valley H.) | 5:36:25 | 52 miles 566 yards (84.2 km) | |
| 28 Sep 1957 | Gerald Walsh (Durban AC, RSA) | 5:26:20 | 52 miles 876 yards (84.5 km) | |
| 27 Sep 1958 | Mike I. Kirkwood (Haltemprice) | 5:47:44 | 52 miles 876 yards (84.5 km) | |
| 26 Sep 1959 | Fritz Madel (Durban AC, RSA) | 5:43:58 | 52 miles 876 yards (84.5 km) | |
| 24 Sep 1960 | Jackie Mekler (Germiston Callies H., RSA) | 5:25:56 | 52 miles 876 yards (84.5 km) | |
| 30 Sep 1961 | John C. Smith (Epsom & Ewell H.) | 5:37:43 | 52 miles 876 yards (84.5 km) | |
| 29 Sep 1962 | John C. Smith (Epsom & Ewell H.) | 5:35:22 | 52 miles 876 yards (84.5 km) | |
| 28 Sep 1963 | Bernard Gomersall (Leeds Harehills) | 5:47:55 | 52 miles 876 yards (84.5 km) | |
| 26 Sep 1964 | Bernard Gomersall (Leeds Harehills) | 5:39:44 | 52 miles 876 yards (84.5 km) | |
| 25 Sep 1965 | Bernard Gomersall (Leeds Harehills) | 5:40:11 | 52 miles 876 yards (84.5 km) | |
| 24 Sep 1966 | Bernard Gomersall (Leeds Harehills) | 5:32:50 | 52 miles 876 yards (84.5 km) | |
| 8 Oct 1967 | John Tarrant (Salford H.) | 5:41:50 | 52 miles 876 yards (84.5 km) | |
| 29 Sep 1968 | John Tarrant (Salford H.) | 5:37:27 | 52 miles 876 yards (84.5 km) | |
| 28 Sep 1969 | Dave Bagshaw (Savages AC, RSA) | 5:28:35 | 52 miles 1,172 yards (84.8 km) | |
| 27 Sep 1970 | Joseph Clare (Blackheath H. & Royal Navy) | 5:41:08 | 52 miles 1,172 yards (84.8 km) | |
| 26 Sep 1971 | David Levick (Witwatersrand Un., RSA) | 5:21:45 | 52 miles 1,172 yards (84.8 km) | |
| 1 Oct 1972 | Alastair J. Wood (Aberdeen AC) | 5:11:02 | 52 miles 1,172 yards (84.8 km) | |
| 30 Sep 1973 | Joe Keating (Ealing & Southall AC) | 5:11:30 | 52 miles 1,172 yards (84.8 km) | |
| 29 Sep 1974 | John V. Newsome (Wakefield H. & AC) | 5:16:07 | 52 miles 1,172 yards (84.8 km) | |
| 28 Sep 1975 | Cavin Woodward (Leamington C. & AC) | 5:12:07 | 52 miles 1,172 yards (84.8 km) | |
| 26 Sep 1976 | Thomas P. O'Reilly (Small Heath H.) | 5:23:32 | 52 miles 1,568 yards (85.1 km) | |
| 25 Sep 1977 | Donald Ritchie (Forres H.) | 5:16:05 | 52 miles 1,568 yards (85.1 km) | |
| 1 Oct 1978 | Donald Ritchie (Forres H.) | 5:13:02 | 53 miles 856 yards (86.1 km) | |
| 30 Sep 1979 | Allan Kirik (Central Park Track Club, USA) | 5:32:37 | 54 miles 460 yards (87.3 km) | |
| 28 Sep 1980 | Ian Thompson (Luton United AC) | 5:15:15 | 54 miles 460 yards (87.3 km) | |
| 27 Sep 1981 | Bruce Fordyce (Witwatersrand Un., RSA) | 5:21:15 | 53 miles 856 yards (86.1 km) | |
| 26 Sep 1982 | Bruce Fordyce (Witwatersrand Un., RSA) | 5:18:36 | 53 miles 856 yards (86.1 km) | |
| 25 Sep 1983 | Bruce Fordyce (Witwatersrand Un., RSA) | 5:12:32 | 53 miles 1,082 yards (86.3 km) | |
| 7 Oct 1984 | Barry Heath (Royal Marines) | 5:24:15 | 53 miles 540 yards (85.8 km) | |
| 6 Oct 1985 | Hoseah Tjale (Johannesburg H., RSA) | 5:31:26 | 53 miles 540 yards (85.8 km) | |
| 5 Oct 1986 | Terry Tullett (Brighton & Hove AC) | 5:53:10 | 53 miles 540 yards (85.8 km) | |
| 4 Oct 1987 | Peter Sugden (Reading AC) | 5:36:59 | 53 miles 495 yards (85.7 km) | |
| 9 Oct 1988 | Mark Pickard (Epsom & Ewell H.) | 6:06:25 | 53 miles 495 yards (85.7 km) | |
| 8 Oct 1989 | Erik Seedhouse (City of Hull AC) | 5:24:48 | 53 miles 495 yards (85.7 km) | |
| 7 Oct 1990 | David Beattie (Crawley AC) | 5:54:32 | 53 miles 495 yards (85.7 km) | |
| 6 Oct 1991 | David Kelly (Barrow AC) | 6:13:56 | 55 miles (88.5 km) | |
| 4 Oct 1992 | Stephen Moore (Hertford & Ware AC) | 6:01:09 | 55 miles (88.5 km) | |
| 3 Oct 1993 | Stephen Moore (Hertford & Ware AC) | 6:07:22 | 55 miles (88.5 km) | |
| 2 Oct 1994 | Shaun Meiklejohn (Collegian H., RSA) | 6:01:02 | 55 miles (88.5 km) | |
| 1 Oct 1995 | Sarel Ackermann (Verwoerdburg Marathon Club, RSA) | 5:55:49 | 55 miles (88.5 km) | |
| 6 Oct 1996 | Greg Dell (Woodstock Harriers) | 6:00:59 | 55 miles (88.5 km) | |
| 5 Oct 1997 | Stephen Moore (Hertford & Ware AC) | 6:05:32 | 55 miles (88.5 km) | |
| 4 Oct 1998 | Colin Thomas (Liberty Life Reebok AC, RSA) | 6:02:17 | 55 miles (88.5 km) | |
| 3 Oct 1999 | Stephen Moore (Hertford & Ware AC) | 6:02:45 | 55 miles (88.5 km) | |
| 1 Oct 2000 | Sarel Ackermann (Verwoerdburg Marathon Club, RSA) | 5:56:50 | 55 miles (88.5 km) | |
| 7 Oct 2001 | Andriy Kotsybka (Sport Club Parus, UKR) | 6:42:13 | 55 miles (88.5 km) | |
| 6 Oct 2002 | Brian Hennessey (Crawley AC) | 6:00:57 | 54 miles 194 yards (87.1 km) | |
| 5 Oct 2003 | Brian Hennessey (Crawley AC) | 6:24:04 | 54 miles 194 yards (87.1 km) | |
| 3 Oct 2004 | Brian Hennessey (Crawley AC) | 6:13:59 | 54 miles 194 yards (87.1 km) | |
| 2 Oct 2005 | Johannes Oosthuizen (Liberty Life Nike AC, RSA) | 5:50:30 | 54 miles 194 yards (87.1 km) | |

Winners of the London to Brighton Road Race (Women)
| Date | Athlete (Affiliation) | Time h:mm:ss | Distance | Source |
|---|---|---|---|---|
| 1 Oct 1972 | Dale Greig (Tannahill Harriers) | 8:30:04 | 52 miles 1,172 yards (84.8 km) | |
| 30 Sep 1979 | Leslie Watson (London Olympiades AC) | 6:55:11 | 54 miles 460 yards (87.3 km) | |
| 28 Sep 1980 | Leslie Watson (London Olympiades AC) | 6:56:10 | 54 miles 460 yards (87.3 km) | |
| 27 Sep 1981 | Lynn Fitzgerald (Highgate Harriers) | 7:47:28 | 53 miles 856 yards (86.1 km) | |
| 26 Sep 1982 | Ann Franklin (Mynyddwr de Cymru) | 7:01:51 | 53 miles 856 yards (86.1 km) | |
| 25 Sep 1983 | Ann Franklin (Mynyddwr de Cymru) | 6:37:08 | 53 miles 1,082 yards (86.3 km) | |
| 6 Oct 1985 | Sandra Kiddy (Palm Springs, USA) | 7:02:37 | 53 miles 540 yards (85.8 km) | |
| 5 Oct 1986 | Eleanor Robinson (Sutton-in-Ashfield AC) | 6:42:40 | 53 miles 540 yards (85.8 km) | |
| 4 Oct 1987 | Hilary Johnson (Harborough AC) | 7:15:40 | 53 miles 495 yards (85.7 km) | |
| 9 Oct 1988 | Hilary Walker (Serpentine RC) | 7:07:48 | 53 miles 495 yards (85.7 km) | |
| 8 Oct 1989 | Hilary Walker (Serpentine RC) | 6:43:22 | 53 miles 495 yards (85.7 km) | |
| 7 Oct 1990 | Hilary Walker (Serpentine RC) | 6:51:24 | 53 miles 495 yards (85.7 km) | |
| 6 Oct 1991 | Carolyn Hunter-Rowe (Pudsey & Bramley AC) | 7:18:09 | 55 miles (88.5 km) | |
| 4 Oct 1992 | Dalene Vermeulen (Ceres AC, RSA) | 7:54:55 | 55 miles (88.5 km) | |
| 3 Oct 1993 | Carolyn Hunter-Rowe (Pudsey & Bramley AC) | 6:34:10 | 55 miles (88.5 km) | |
| 2 Oct 1994 | Jackie Leak (Chiltern Harriers) | 7:06:22 | 55 miles (88.5 km) | |
| 1 Oct 1995 | Lesley Turner (Rowheath Harriers) | 7:11:39 | 55 miles (88.5 km) | |
| 6 Oct 1996 | Hilary Walker (Serpentine RC) | 7:40:13 | 55 miles (88.5 km) | |
| 5 Oct 1997 | Rae Bisschoff (Rocky Road Runners, RSA) | 7:05:56 | 55 miles (88.5 km) | |
| 4 Oct 1998 | Ina Sanders (Rand Athletic Club, RSA) | 7:02:26 | 55 miles (88.5 km) | |
| 3 Oct 1999 | Hilary Walker (Serpentine RC) | 7:42:29 | 55 miles (88.5 km) | |
| 1 Oct 2000 | Danielle Sanderson (Watford Harriers) | 7:07:12 | 55 miles (88.5 km) | |
| 7 Oct 2001 | Elizabeth Neville (Epsom Allsorts) | 8:42:03 | 55 miles (88.5 km) | |
| 6 Oct 2002 | Michelle Stewart (Edgemead Runners, RSA) | 7:25:07 | 54 miles 194 yards (87.1 km) | |
| 5 Oct 2003 | Ellen McCurtin (Millrose AAC, USA) | 7:02:27 | 54 miles 194 yards (87.1 km) | |
| 3 Oct 2004 | Vicky Skelton (North Devon Road Runners) | 7:20:43 | 54 miles 194 yards (87.1 km) | |
| 2 Oct 2005 | Vicky Skelton (North Devon Road Runners) | 7:17:10 | 54 miles 194 yards (87.1 km) | |

Winners of News of the World London to Brighton Relay
| Date | Winning Club | Time h:mm:ss |
|---|---|---|
| 5 Jan 1924 | Surrey AC | 4:50:00 |
| 18 Apr 1925 | Birchfield H. | 4:50:52 |
| 10 Apr 1926 | Birchfield H. | 4:45:34 |
| 9 Apr 1927 | Hallamshire H. | 4:41:17 |
| 14 Apr 1928 | Birchfield H. | 4:41:49 |
| 6 Apr 1929 | Hallamshire H. | 4:48:37 |
| 12 Apr 1930 | Birchfield H. | 4:47:29 |
| 11 Apr 1931 | Birchfield H. | 4:48:58 |
| 16 Apr 1932 | Salford H. | 4:39:52 |
| 15 Apr 1933 | Salford H. | 4:45:30 |
| 14 Apr 1934 | Belgrave H. | 4:49:55 |
| 13 Apr 1935 | Belgrave H. | 4:49:59 |
| 25 Apr 1936 | Belgrave H. | 4:37:55 |
| 13 Apr 1937 | Mitcham AC | 3:52:05 |
| 7 May 1938 | Mitcham AC | 3:48:29 |
| 10 Apr 1939 | Mitcham AC | 3:54:19 |
| 19 Apr 1947 | Belgrave H. | 4:03:19 |
| 10 Apr 1948 | Belgrave H. | 3:57:29 |
| 2 Apr 1949 | Belgrave H. | 3:57:35 |
| 7 Apr 1951 | Belgrave H. | 3:53:38 |
| 5 Apr 1952 | Birchfield H. | 3:54:55 |
| 11 Apr 1953 | Thames Valley H. | 3:52:16 |
| 10 Apr 1954 | South London H. | 4:31:37 |
| 16 Apr 1955 | South London H. | 4:29:19 |
| 14 Apr 1956 | South London H. | 4:29:33 |
| 13 Apr 1957 | South London H. | 4:25:51 |
| 12 Apr 1958 | Thames Valley H. | 4:29:13 |
| 11 Apr 1959 | Derby & County AC | 4:40:21 |
| 9 Apr 1960 | Derby & County AC | 4:33:18 |
| 8 Apr 1961 | Derby & County AC | 4:29:15 |
| 14 Apr 1962 | Derby & County AC | 4:23:42 |
| 6 Apr 1963 | Coventry Godiva H. | 4:26:15 |
| 4 Apr 1964 | Coventry Godiva H. | 4:19:34 |
| 10 Apr 1965 | Coventry Godiva H. | 4:26:11 |

== See also ==
- London to Brighton events

== General references ==
- Brighton and Its Coaches: A History of the London and Brighton Road (1894) by William C. A. Blew
- The Brighton Road (1906) by Charles G. Harper (1863–1943)
- Road Runners Club History of the London to Brighton
- Association of Road Race Statisticians
- Ultra Marathon Statistics (Deutsche Ultramarathon Vereiniging) - London to Brighton road race
