= Ron Bentley =

British ultrarunner (1930–2019)

Personal information
- Nationality: British
- Born: November 10, 1930
- Died: February 22, 2019 (aged 88)
- Home town: Gornal, West Midlands
- Spouse: Eva (1952-2019)

Sport
- Country: United Kingdom
- Sport: Running
- Event: Ultramarathon
- Club: Tipton Harriers

Achievements and titles
- Personal best: 24 hours: 161.3 miles (1973, WR)

Ron Bentley (10 November 1930 - 22 February 2019) was a British ultrarunner and holder of the world record for the longest distance run in 24 hours.

== Early life ==
Bentley was born on 10 November 1930 in Hurst Hill, Dudley, an area known locally as the 'backside'. He was the first-born of his father's second wife. In addition to his five brothers and three sisters from his father's first, deceased wife, he had a further two brothers from his own mother. He was brought up in two-bedroom house without gas or electricity, nor radio or television. At this time he heard about Jack Holden, who lived nearby and was Britain's leading distance runner and a member of Tipton Harriers.

== Running ==
Bentley joined Tipton Harriers running club in 1951. He remained a member of the club for the rest of his life, competing as an athlete as well as serving as a volunteer, officer and president. He won medals at county, area and national levels, both on the road and cross-country.

Bentley ran his first marathon in 1958, the Midland Marathon Championship at Baddesley, finishing in third place with a time of 2h 47m 18s. From there he went on to run ultramarathons, making up the Tipton Harriers ultra team for the 1964 London to Brighton alongside George Johnson and Tony Fern. He finished in 23rd place in a time of 7h 7m 22s, with his team mates well ahead of him. Nevertheless, the team took the title.

After winning the 1970 Exeter to Plymouth 44-mile race, setting a course record of 4 hours 41 minutes & 23 seconds, the British Road Runners Club (RRC) invited Bentley to take part in the RRC Radox 100 Mile Track on 23 October 1971 at Uxbridge. Twelve runners started, including Phil Hampton, who was then the world's fastest over 50 miles, and John Tarrant, the 100 mile UK record holder. Bentley led from just after half way and held on to win in a time of 12h 37m 55s, six minutes off the UK record.

In 1971, the Tipton Harriers ultra runners won the Scottish Two Bridges race after which they were challenged to take part in the Comrades Marathon in 1972. After winning the 1971 London to Brighton, the team focused attention on preparing for Comrades, which they duly won, with Bentley finishing 13th. A few weeks later, an injury to his left foot at work put Bentley out of action for six weeks.

In July 1973, he injured the same foot again at work, this time a nail going through his foot. Consequently, he was unable to finish the Two Bridges in August, with just eight weeks to go until the RRC 24 Hour Race in November. But in September he set a new personal best at the London to Brighton of 5h 46m 50s. He took a week off then trained for the four weeks before the race, taking two days' rest before the race.

On 3 and 4 November 1973, Bentley participated took on the 24-hour distance running trial at Walton-on-Thames running track, hosted by the RRC. The race is recounted in detail in the biography of American ultrarunner Ted Corbitt, and in a lengthy article written by Chris Holloway for the 40-year anniversary of the record.

== Personal life ==
Bentley married Eva in 1952. They had two children, Jane, born September 1954; and Ron Junior, December 1958.
