= William Taylor (marathon runner) =

British athlete

Personal information
- Nationality: British (English)
- Born: 1870 Hoxton, London, England
- Died: Unknown

Sport
- Sport: Athletics
- Event: marathon
- Club: Essex Beagles

William Taylor (1870 – date of death unknown) was a British track and field athlete who competed at the 1900 Summer Olympics in Paris, France.

== Biography ==
Taylor was born in Hoxton, London, England, and was a member of Beaumont Harriers (later Essex Beagles). Taylor was also a member of the Essex Cycling Club and competed in racewalking. He would become honorary secretary of both the Essex Beagles and Essex Cycling Club.

He finished fourth behind Frederick Randall the 1899 London to Brighton race, and along with fellow Beagles runner Billy Saward earned selection for the marathon at the 1900 Olympic Games. However, he was one of six runners who did not finish the race, attributed to the warm weather on the day.

Taylor also ran for the Herne Hill Harriers cross country team and ran 108 miles in 24 hours in the Brighton and back Go as You please race during 1902.

Taylor was a life insurance agent by trade.
