= London to Brighton (disambiguation) =

London to Brighton is a 2006 film by Paul Andrew Williams.

London to Brighton may also refer to:

- London to Brighton road race, a road race from Westminster Bridge to the Aquarium at Brighton
- London to Brighton walk, a walking race from Westminster Bridge to the Aquarium at Brighton
- London to Brighton Veteran Car Run, an annual motoring event
- London to Brighton events, events that take place between London and Brighton
- Brighton Main Line, a railway line from London to Brighton
- London to Brighton in Four Minutes, an early 1950s BBC film about a train journey
- London to Brighton Way, a Roman road
