= South African ultra-long distances running performances (100km and further) =

South Africans have been participated in various running events 100 kilometres and longer. Some is on road, track or trail. The statistics below show the best performances irrespective of the surface.

== 100 km ==
The current world scenario is as follows;

Men World record: Ritchie, D. 6:10:20, Date: 28 October 1978, London United Kingdom.

Women World record: Abe, T. 6:33:11, Date: 25 June 2000, Ybetsu- Saroma- Tokara, Japan.

The top 3 South African performances were:

100 kilometres
Position	Men	Time	Date obtained	Place obtained	Women	Time	Date obtained	Place obtained
1	Mthembu, B.	6:24:05	27 November 2016	Los Alcázares, Spain	Joubert, H.	7:31:47	16 September 1995	Winschoten, The Netherlands
2	Fordyce, B.	6:25:07	4 February 1989	Stellenbosch, South Africa	du Plessis, R	7:41:52	13 September 1997	Winschoten, The Netherlands
3	Meiklejohn, S.	6:26:58	26 June 1994	Lake Saroma, Japan	van Aswegen, L.	7:42:05	10 September 2011	Winschoten, The Netherlands

== 100 miles ==
The current world scenario is as follows;

Men World record: Bitter, Z 11:19:18, Date: 25 August 2019, Milwaukee, USA

Women World record : Herron, C. 12:42:40, Date: 11 November 2017, Vienna IL USA

The top 3 South African performances were:

100 miles
Position	Men	Time	Date obtained	Place obtained	Women	Time	Date obtained	Place obtained
1	Kay, D.	11:56:56	6 October 1972	Durban, South Africa	Sumner, Y.	16:06:56	14 October 1982	Durban, South Africa
2	Hayward, W.	12:20:28	24 October 1953	Bath, England, United Kingdom	Torr, C	16:20:01	11 October 1986	Durban, South Africa
3	Deeny, EG	12:27:00	September 1977	Johannesburg, South Africa	van der Merwe, M	16:28:10	7 September 1991	Roodepoort, South Africa

== 24 Hour running ==
The current world scenario is as follows;

Men World record : Kouros, Y. 303.50 km, Date: 5 October 1997, Adelaide Australia

Women World record : Herron, C 260.6 km Date: 9 December 2018, Phoenix, USA

The top South African performances were:

24 Hours
Position	Men	Distance	Date obtained	Place obtained	Women	Distance	Date obtained	Place obtained
1	van der Merwe, J.	258.06 km	7 December 2014	Tapei, Taiwan	Edwards, T	209.00 km	16,17 October 2026	Welkom, South Africa
2	Hayward, W.	256.4 km	21 November 1953	Motspur Park, London, United Kingdom	Muller, M	202.196 km	19 October 2025	Albi, France
3	de Beer, N	194.4 km	19 September 2014	Pietermaritzburg, South Africa	Edwards, T	197.0 km	25 September 2021	Irene, South Africa
					Moller, H	190.4 km	19 September 2014	Pietermaritzburg, South Africa
					Sumner, Y	188.65 km	11 October 1986	Durban, South Africa
					Hutchinson, M.	171.3 km	28 August 1971	Johannesburg, South Africa

== 48 Hour running ==
The current world scenario is as follows;

Men World record : Kouros, Y. 473.49 km, Date: 5 May 1996, Surgeres France

Women World record : Inagaki, S. 397.10 Date: 23 May 2010, Surgeres, France

The top South Africans are:

48 Hours
Position	Men	Distance	Date obtained	Place obtained	Women	Distance	Date obtained	Place obtained
1	van der Merwe, J.	333.18 km	May 2013	Hungary	Muller, M.	304.442 km	1 June 2025	Pabiance, Poland
2					Muller, M.	272.768 km	13 August 2023	Gloucester, United Kingdom
3					Muller, M.	267.50 km	30 December 2022	Germiston, South Africa
4					Edwards, T	261.0 km	26 September 2021	Irene, South Africa

== 6 Days running ==
The current world scenario is as follows;

Men World record : Kouros, Y. 1036.8 km, Date: 26 November 2005

Women World record : Barwick, S. 883.63 km Date: 24 November 1990, Campbelltown, Australia

The top South Africans are:

6 Days
Position	Men	Distance	Date obtained	Place obtained	Women	Distance	Date obtained	Place obtained
1	Wright, E.	815.00 km	7 April 2001	Randburg, South Africa	Solomon, I.	631.00 km	2 April 2006	Randburg, South Africa
2	van der Merwe, J.	815.00 km	25 September 2015	Pietermartizburg, South Africa				

== 24 hour mile relay ==
The rules are as follows:

A team consist out of ten runners. Each runner runs a mile, before the second person takes over. Runners needs to run in sequence and if a runner cannot run, that runners falls out and the team gets reduced. The minimum runners left must be two.

The current world scenario is as follows;

Men world record: Team- Puma Tyneside Running Club of Great Britain; Date- 11 September 1994; Location- Jarrow; Distance 302 miles 375 yards.

Women world record: Team- LG Kappelberg of Germany; Date- 1982; Location- Mörlenbach; Distance 235 miles 816 yards.

The top South African are:

24 hour mile relay
Men Team	Women Team
University of Cape Town	University of Cape Town
Team members
Bailey, R.	Anderson, F.
Bateman, E.	Bond, C.
Britz, G.	Brodie, A.
Day, R.	Coleman, M.
Liefeldt, G.	Haal, H.
Lievers, S.	Horne, B.
Nott, M.	le Jeune, R.
Robinson, R.	McLachlan, M.
Roome, J.	Moores, T.
Stewart, T.	Smith, M.
Date
22 August 1981	22 August 1981
Location
Cape Town	Cape Town
Distance
293 miles 1735 yards	207 miles 1517 yards
