= Ghost runner =

Ghost runner, Ghost Runner, or Ghostrunner (sometimes appearing with a definite article) may refer to:

== Entertainment ==
- Ghostrunner, a 2020 video game
- Ghost Runner, the name of Marvel Comics character Ghost Rider (Johnny Blaze) in an alternate reality
- "Ghost Runner", a track from Oceana, a 2011 studio album by keyboardist Derek Sherinian
- The Ghost Runner, the book which won Bill Jones the 2012 British Sports Book Award for Best New Writer
- The Ghost Runner, a 2014 novel by Jamal Mahjoub

== Sports ==
- John Tarrant (runner) (1932–1975), English long-distancer runner nicknamed "The Ghost Runner"
- Ghost runner rule, in baseball or softball, a rule that places a runner on second base to start an inning
