= Tee-To-Tum =

Tee-To-Tum was the name of a sports ground in Stamford Hill, London in the 19th century. The Hackney TeeToTum cricket team played there, and it also hosted athletics events such as the professional '25 Mile World Championships'.

'Hackney TeeToTum' was an amateur cricket team that played at Stamford Hill in the late 19th century. Their 'TeeToTum ground' was also used as an amenity for sporting and social events. On 23 September 1901, Len Hurst won the professional '25 Mile World Championships' and two years later, on 27 August 1903 Hurst set the professional world record of 2:32:42, for 25 mi (40 km).
