= Barry 40 =

Ultramarathon in Wales

The Barry 40 is a 40-mile ultramarathon which takes place annually in Barry, Vale of Glamorgan, Wales, claiming to be the longest running annual ultramarathon in the UK. The 30th annual Barry 40 Mile race was held at Jenner Park Stadium, Barry. Both world records were set within this race.

== Records ==
Many records have been set at the race as there are few races of this distance and 59 world best performances including both world records. The women's World Record of 4:26:43 was set by Carolyn Hunter-Rowe in 1993. The men's World Record of 3:45:07 was set by Ollie Garrod (Belgrave Harriers) in 2023.

In addition two Greek National records were set by George Dayantis in 2011. Seventy-seven-year-old Geoff Oliver set new world bests at 30 miles and 50 km in the M75-79 age group in 2011 bringing his total to five world bests set at the Barry 40 mile race.

The overall race records are:

- Women - Carolyn Hunter-Rowe, 4:26:43 (1993)
- Men - Ollie Garrod, 3:45:07 (2023)

== Hosts and venue ==
The race was first held in 1986 and is organised by Les Croupiers Running Club. The race takes place at Jenner Park Stadium.
