= George Traynor =

British long jumper

Personal information
- Nationality: British (English)
- Born: 7 November 1905 Lambeth, London, England
- Died: Q1.1980 (aged 74) Ealing, London, England

Sport
- Sport: Athletics
- Event: Long jump
- Club: Thames Valley Harriers

George Terence Traynor (7 November 1905 – Q1.1980) was a British athlete who competed at the 1936 Summer Olympics.

== Biography ==
Traynor became the national long jump champion after winning the British AAA Championships title at the 1936 AAA Championships.

One month later he was selected to represent Great Britain at the 1936 Olympic Games held in Berlin, where he competed in the men's long jump competition.

He was the long jump Middlesex Champion in 1936 and 1937.
