= Dartmoor Discovery =

Ultramarathon run in Dartmoor, England

The Dartmoor Discovery is an ultramarathon run around Dartmoor in early June (recently the first Saturday in June). The race is entirely on roads. It starts and finishes in Princetown, famous as the home of Dartmoor Prison. The current distance is 52.115 km (32 miles 674 yards). Entrants are required to have completed a Marathon on an 'average' course in less than 5 hours (or something equivalent). The 2018 race was the 20th running of the race. There is a limit of 260 entries for the race.

The main features of the race are the delightful countryside of Dartmoor and the associated hills. The total rise of the hills is about 1200 metres (nearly 4000 ft). Because of the hills, times are typically about 50% longer than those of a flat Marathon, even though the course is only 10 km longer than a Marathon.

There are 10 refreshment stations at which water is provided. Facilities are made available for the runners to take their own food and/or drinks from the start to these stations.

== History ==
The race was first run in 1998 on a slightly longer course (54.918 km, 34 miles 219 yards) which involved the final section from Two Bridges to Princetown going past Dartmoor Prison instead of on the direct route. The same course was used in 1999 and 2000. It was also used in 2018 to celebrate the twentieth running of the event.

The race was cancelled in 2001 because of the Foot and Mouth outbreak and 2020 because of the COVID-19 pandemic. Since 2002, the race has been run on the current, slightly shorter route (the only exception being in 2018 as noted above).

== Course ==
The race begins in the centre of Princetown (Ordnance Survey mapping six-figure grid reference SX591735 at an altitude of 420 metres) and goes along the B3212 to Two Bridges (SX608750 340m). The race then turns east along the B3357. This section is relatively flat until the road drops down into Dartmeet (SX672732 225m) at about 9.5km.

The road now rises steeply onto YarTor Down (355m) before falling again, passing Poundsgate, until it reaches New Bridge (SX712708 100m). The road then rises again (155m) before falling to Holne Bridge (SX730706 60m). The road is now relatively flat and passing Peartree Cross reaches Ashburton (SX756699 70m) at about 21km. This is the lowest part of the course after a drop of 350 m from the start despite some steep climbs.

In the centre of Ashburton the course takes the road to Buckland in the Moor and rises to Ausewell Cross (SX739721 290m) before dropping to 205 m just before Buckland in the moor (SX721731 230m). At Stone Cross (SX719746 280m) the route turns right onto Pudsham Down (SX731746 360m) when the runners take a sharp left turn down into Widecombe-in-the-Moor (SX718768 240m) at about the 32km point.

Turning left take the road towards Ponsworthy but after about 2km (SX711751 295m) turn right and onto the moor again. The road travels north passed Rowden Cross and Longworthy before the runners turn left (SX697778 315m). This road is followed until the B3212 is reached (SX657797 375m) soon after the Marathon distance.

Turning left the B3212 soon passes Postbridge (SX648789 315m) and eventually reaches the B3357 at Two Bridges (SX608750 340m). The runners then return to Princetown (SX591735 420m) by the B3212.

== Past Results ==
The winners of the races are given below. The first three races were run on a longer course, as was the 2018 Anniversary race.

Year	First Man	Time	Men	First Woman	Time	Women	Finishers
1998	Brian Davidson	3:56:36	79	Peggy Wiseman	5:38:02	4	83
1999	Mike Jacobs	3:58:52	99	Hilary Walker	4:48:09	10	109
2000	Shaun Milford	3:51:55	85	Hilary Walker	4:53:59	11	96
2001	Cancelled			Cancelled			
2002	Mike Feighan	3:36:18	64	Carolyn Hunter-Rowe	4:20:12	6	70
2003	Mike Feighan	3:44:45	76	Christine Costiff	4:41:14	15	91
2004	David Stone	3:51:48	76	Heather Foundling-Hawker	4:30:00	24	100
2005	Brian Cole	3:39:21	96	Heather Foundling-Hawker	4:17:16	27	123
2006	Brian Cole	3:49:27	110	Heather Foundling-Hawker	4:05:38	44	154
2007	Brian Cole	3:44:58	126	Heather Foundling-Hawker	4:07:50	34	160
2008	Brian Cole	3:47:51	124	Adela Salt	4:02:36	30	154
2009	Alan Ryder	3:43:43	89	Emily Gelder	4:39:12	29	118
2010	David Stone	3:50:53	101	Helen Taranowski	4:18:46	29	130
2011	David Tomlin	3:57:48	118	Diane Roy	4:29:50	28	146
2012	John Ward	3:33:36	137	Isobel Wykes	4:07:32	38	175
2013	Robin Tuddenham	3:57:42	143	Isobel Wykes	4:21:53	40	183
2014	John Ward	3:29:24		Lucy Richens	4:16:04		202
2015	Toby Chapman	3:51:42		Helen Anthony	4:18:29		194
2016	Simon Longthorpe	3:48:01		Holly Rush	4:03:15		196
2017	Adam Holland	3:44:22		Lynette Porter	4:15:28		192
2018	Adam Holland	3:58:43		Emily Warren	4:59:17		186
2019	Kieron Summers	3:57:02		Joanne Page	4:50:40		180
2020	Cancelled			Cancelled			
2021	Kieron Summers	3:51:31		Hannah Bown	4:37:46		177
2022	Ryan Snell	3:46:27		Alice Smith	4:23:41		165

The current best times are given below (3:45 for men, 4:20 for women)

Year	Name	Time
2014	John Ward	3:29:24
2012	John Ward	3:33:36
2002	Mike Feighan	3:36:18
2005	Brian Cole	3:39:21
2005	Brian Hennessey	3:41:33
2009	Alan Ryder	3:43:43
2009	Mark Croasdale	3:43:44
2012	David Stone	3:43:59
2017	Adam Holland	3:44:22
2003	Mike Feighan	3:44:45
2007	Brian Cole	3:44:58

Year	Name	Time
2008	Adela Salt	4:02:36
2016	Holly Rush	4:03:15
2006	Heather Foundling-Hawker	4:05:38
2012	Isobel Wykes	4:07:32
2007	Heather Foundling-Hawker	4:07:50
2017	Lynette Porter	4:15:28
2014	Lucy Richens	4:16:04
2016	Naomi Flanagan	4:16:04
2005	Heather Foundling-Hawker	4:17:16
2015	Helen Anthony	4:18:29
2010	Helen Taranowski	4:18:46
2016	Isobel Wykes	4:19:38
