= William Saward =

British athlete (1868–1944)

Billy Saward
Personal information
- Nationality: British (English)
- Born: 15 September 1868 Thurrock, England
- Died: 1944 (aged 75–76) Thurrock, England

Sport
- Sport: Athletics
- Event: marathon
- Club: Essex Beagles

William George Saward (15 September 1868 – 1944) was a British long-distance runner who competed at the 1900 Summer Olympics in Paris, France.

== Biography ==
Saward was born in Thurrock and was a member of Essex Beagles. In 1894, he helped his club win the Southern Counties Cross Country title at Wembley Park.

Saward finished runner-up behind Frederick Randall in the 1899 London to Brighton race, which earned selection for the marathon at the 1900 Olympic Games. However, he was one of six runners who did not finish the race, attributed to the warm weather on the day. He later turned professional.
