= London to Brighton events =

Events that take place between London and Brighton

London to Brighton refers to a variety of races, tours, charity bicycle rides and rallies that take place between London and Brighton in the United Kingdom.

The route often follows the A23 (and, often, nearby minor roads). The route is full of contrasts, (depending on the starting point and exact route) passing through the London suburbs of Westminster, Brixton, Sutton, Croydon and Purley, past Gatwick Airport, Crawley and then into the countryside of The Weald, crossing the North and South Downs. Ditchling Beacon on the South Downs (near but not part of the A23) is a steep climb followed by a gentle descent for five miles into Brighton, where the route finishes on the promenade by the Kings Road arches. The current London to Brighton Veteran Car Run does not use the route past the Ditchling Beacon but follows the A273 road up Clayton Hill and rejoins the A23 at Pyecombe.

== London to Brighton Veteran Car Run ==
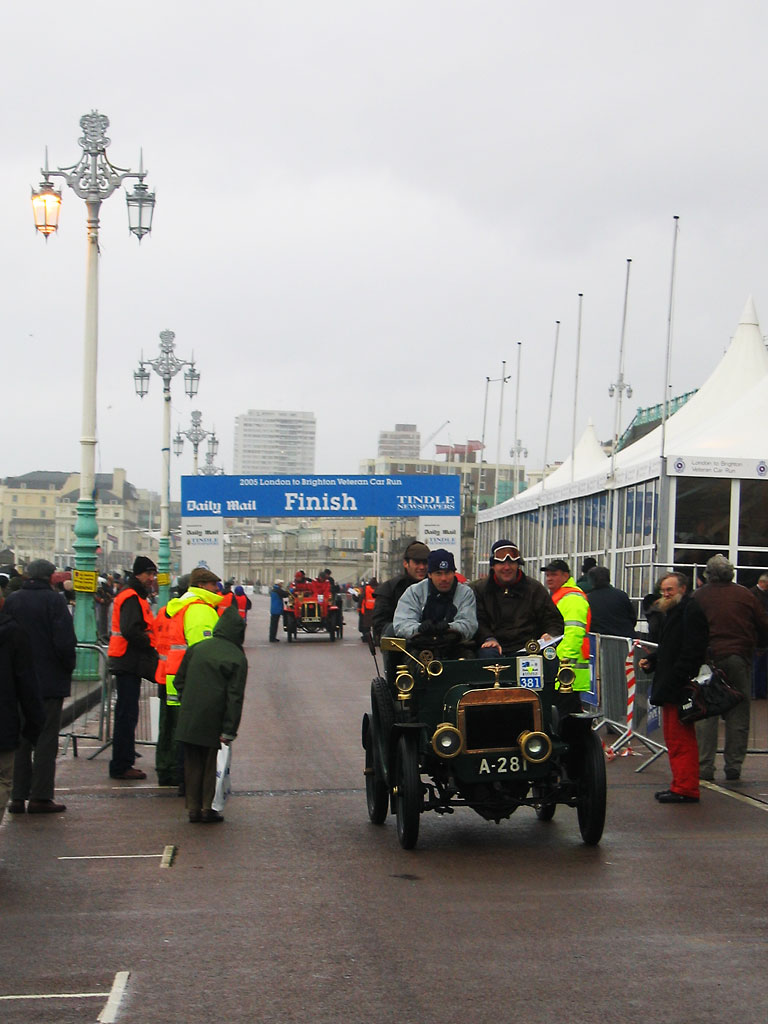
Finish line of the London to Brighton Veteran Car Run, 2005

The route was originally popularised by the London to Brighton Veteran Car Run begun in 1927 for cars built before 1904 and re-enacting the original 1896 Emancipation Run, which was held on 14 November 1896 to celebrate the passing into law of the Locomotives on Highways Act 1896 which raised the speed limit to 14 mph (23 km/h) and did away with the need for a person to walk in front of a mechanised vehicle waving a red flag to warn other road users. In 2007 531 cars participated and over ninety percent of them finished the course; in 2008 there were 550, with 126 international entries from as far away as Australia, Canada, USA, Argentina and South Africa.

== London to Brighton Bike Ride ==
Several fundraising bike rides take place between London and Brighton each year. The most famous is the British Heart Foundation event which has taken place each summer since 1976, and in 2014 involved an estimated 30,000 riders. The event starts on Clapham Common and the 54 mile route finishes on Madeira Drive in Brighton. Despite most roads being closed to cars, the number of bikes is such that traffic jams occur, especially at hills. The toughest part of the route is the climb over Ditchling Beacon which once featured in the Tour de France; having already cycled some 50 miles (80 km), cyclists must then tackle a 1 mi (1.6 km) climb with an average grade exceeding 1 in 10. Several sections are somewhat steeper, and whilst the fittest will try to cycle up, the vast majority will walk.

To date, over 650,000 riders have taken part and have raised over £40 million for the British Heart Foundation. In recent years, the BHF have introduced a night ride and an off-road ride. These are on separate dates, and some competitors will ride all three routes in the same year.

== Running events ==
An ultramarathon running race used to take this route each October, starting on Westminster Bridge in the centre of London, and finishing at The Level in Brighton. This is a distance of 54 miles, 198 yards (87.085 km). The race was organised by the Road Runners Club from 1951 to 2005. However, the course had been raced over at least since the early 19th century, and regularly since 1899. In its later years the race was low-key with just over one hundred runners taking part. The fastest would finish in well under 6 hours, whilst there was a time limit of 10 hours after which the course was not marshalled. The race was discontinued after 2005 because of increasing road traffic and difficulties in finding sufficient marshals.

Past winners
Year	Time (Men)	Men's Champion	Country	Time (Women)	Women's Champion	Country
2005	05:50:30	J Oosthuizen	South Africa	07:17:10	V Skelton	England
2004	06:13:59	B Hennessey	England	07:20:43	V Skelton	England
2003	06:24:04	B Hennessey	England	07:02:27	E McCurtin	United States
2002	06:00:57	B Hennessey	England	07:25:07	M Stewart	South Africa
2001	06:42:13	A Kotsybka	Ukraine	08:42:03	L Neville	United Kingdom
2000	05:56:50	S Ackermann	South Africa	07:07:12	D Sanderson	England
1999	06:02:45	S Moore	England	07:42:29	H. Walker	United Kingdom
1998	06:02:17	C.Thomas	South Africa	07:02:26	I.Sanders	South Africa
1997	06:05:32	S.Moore	England	07:05:56	R.Bisschoff	South Africa
1996	06:00:59	G.Dell	England	07:40:13	H.Walker	United Kingdom
1995	05:55:49	S.Akermann	South Africa	07:11:39	L.Turner	United Kingdom
1994	06:01:02	Shaun Meiklejohn	South Africa	07:06:22	J.Leak	United Kingdom
1993	06:07:22	S.Moore	England	06:34:10	Carolyn Hunter-Rowe	United Kingdom
1992	06:01:09	S.Moore	England	07:54:55	D.Vermeulen	South Africa
1991	06:13:56	D.Kelley	England	07:18:09	Carolyn Hunter-Rowe	United Kingdom
1990	05:54:32	D.Beattie	England	06:51:24	H.Walker	England
1989	05:24:48	E Seedhouse	Canada	06:43:22	H.Walker	England
1988	06:06:25	M.Pickard	England	07:07:48	H.Walker	England
1987	05:36:59	P.Sugden	England	07:15:40	H.Johnson	United Kingdom
1986	05:53:10	T.Tullett	United Kingdom	06:42:40	Eleanor Robinson	England
1985	05:31:26	Hoseah Tjale	South Africa	07:02:37	S.Kiddy	United States
1984	05:24:15	B.Heath	England			
1983	05:12:32	Bruce Fordyce	South Africa	06:37:08	A.Franklin	Wales
1982	05:18:36	Bruce Fordyce	South Africa	07:01:51	A.Franklin	Wales
1981	05:21:15	Bruce Fordyce	South Africa	07:47:28	L.Fitzgerald	United Kingdom
1980	05:15:15	Ian Thompson	England	06:56:10	L.Watson	Scotland
1979	05:32:37	A.Kirik	United States	06:55:11	L.Watson	Scotland
1978	05:13:02	Don Ritchie	Scotland			
1977	05:16:05	Don Ritchie	Scotland			
1976	05:23:32	T.O'Reilly	England			
1975	05:12:07	C.Woodward	England			
1974	05:16:07	J.Newsome	England			
1973	05:11:30	J.Keating	England			
1972	05:11:02	A.J. Wood	Scotland			
1971	05:21:45	D.Levick	South Africa			
1970	05:41:08	J.Clare	Scotland			
1969	05:28:53	D.Bagshaw	South Africa			
1968	05:37:27	John Tarrant (athlete)	England			
1967	05:41:50	John Tarrant (athlete)	England			
1966	05:32:50	B.Gomersall	England			
1965	05:40:11	B.Gomersall	England			
1964	05:39:44	B.Gomersall	England			
1963	05:47:55	B.Gomersall	England			
1962	05:35:22	J.C. Smith	United Kingdom			
1961	05:37:43	J.C. Smith	United Kingdom			
1960	05:25:56	Jackie Mekler	South Africa			
1959	05:43:58	F.Madel	South Africa			
1958	05:47:44	M.I. Kirkwood	United Kingdom			
1957	05:26:20	G.Walsh	South Africa			
1956	05:36:25	R.F. Hopcroft	United Kingdom			
1955	05:27:24	Tom Richards (athlete)	Wales			
1954	05:39:46	W.H. Kelly	United Kingdom			
1953	05:29:40	Wally Hayward	South Africa			
1952	05:52:22	D.E. Reynolds	United Kingdom			
1951	06:18:40	L.Piper	United Kingdom			

In 2010 the ultra-running organisation Extreme Running staged an off-road London to Brighton Trail Race from Blackheath in London to Brighton sea front (56 miles). The winning time was 8 hours 32 minutes. The race was next planned to be held in 2011.

Since 2011, the company UltraChallenge has organised annually a mixed road/trail 100K race from Richmond in West London to Brighton's racecourse. The course can be run or walked.

From Piccadilly to Brighton there is a marathon route.

== London to Brighton Mini Run ==
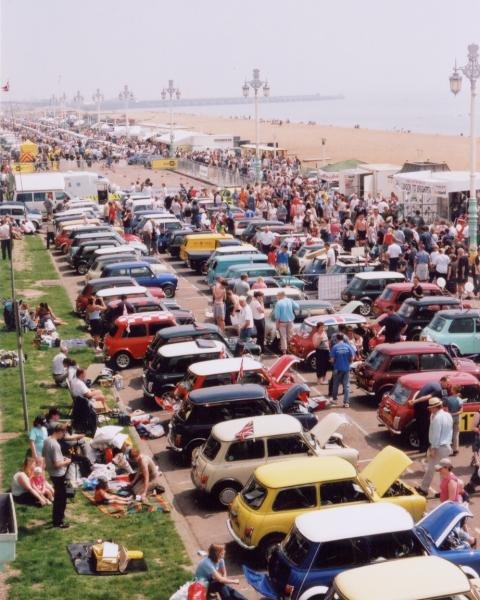
Seafront display of Minis after a London to Brighton drive

The London to Brighton Mini Run takes place on the 3rd Sunday in May. It celebrated its 25th anniversary in 2010. In 2009 the event broke the world record for the longest convoy of Minis with a Guinness-verified total of 1450 cars. The London to Brighton Mini Run features a large number of Minis both classic and modern. It is organised by the London & Surrey Mini Owners Club. The event was the brainchild of Mark Steward, who took ideas from the Vintage runs (from London to Brighton). It originally started at Battersea Park but as it grew it moved to Crystal Palace until 2022 when it moved to Cheam. The Route has always followed the A23. The 2023 run was the last one. The introduction of the London ULEZ (a £12.50/day charge for those non-compliant vehicles) and the increasing challenge of organising the event for the LSMOC team was cited as the reason for them not organising an event in 2024.

== Other motoring events ==
In 2005 this tradition was copied in the United States. The SotaMINIs car club organized the New London to New Brighton Run in the state of Minnesota (Mini-sota). Minnesota is the only state in the US that has both a New London and a New Brighton. The distance between the two is exactly twice the distance from London to Brighton. The first year it was attended by 20 MINIs/Minis. It has since doubled in size. The club, SotaMINIs (new MINIs) has since merged with the Classic Mini club called MMPE&PSHE (the Mini-sota Minis Pizza Eating & Psychiatric Self-Help Association). The new club is called Minnesota United Minis Minnesota United Minis (M.U.M.) and the tradition of the New London to New Brighton run is still going strong in 2016.

The London to Brighton Land Rover Run is an annual gathering of Land Rover enthusiasts organised by the South London and Surrey Land Rover Club. The event started at Crystal Palace Park until an extension of the London Emissions Zone forced it to move. Since 2012 it has been held at Hook Road Arena in Epsom and the Land Rovers drive down to Madeira Drive in Brighton. The event takes place on or around the first Sunday in October.

== Other events ==
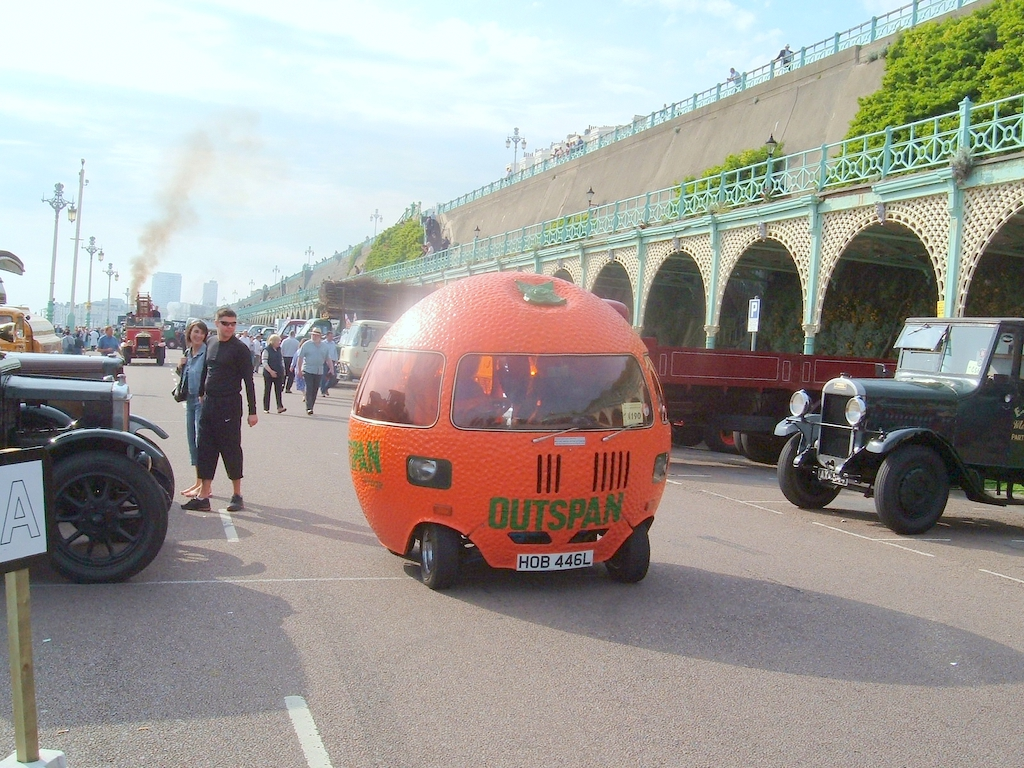
Madeira Drive at the finish of the Historic Commercial Vehicle Run

Other London to Brighton events include those for MGs, air-cooled Volkswagens, 2CVs, vintage motorcycles, Smart Cars, vintage commercial vehicles, and electric vehicles. Most events, especially motoring events, finish at Madeira Drive on the seafront.

== See also ==
- London to Brighton in Four Minutes, speeded-up film of train journey
- Transport in Brighton
- Landmarks and notable buildings of Brighton and Hove
