= Ron Hopcroft =

British ultrarunner

Personal information
- Nationality: British
- Born: 27 February 1918
- Died: 17 March 2016 (aged 98)

Sport
- Country: United Kingdom
- Sport: Running
- Event: Ultramarathon
- Club: Thames Valley Harriers

Achievements and titles
- Personal best(s): 50 miles: 5:23:30 (1957, WR); 100 miles: 12:18:16 (1958, WR)

Ronald Frederick Hopcroft (27 February 1918 – 17 March 2016) was a British ultrarunner, who held the world records for 50 miles and 100 miles.

== Running ==
=== Early years ===
Hopcroft was born in Cheswick, England and was active in many sports as a schoolboy. At the age of 17, Hopcroft joined Ashcombe AC, and competed on the athletics track and in cross country races. A few years later in 1939, he was called up to military service at the start of World War II. In 1941, he was posted back in London and discovered his athletics club had disbanded, so he joined Thames Valley Harriers.

=== London to Brighton ===
Hopcroft continued running on the track until 1949 when, at the age of 31, he turned to road running to improve his endurance for the cross country season. He began to increase his weekly mileage going from three runs a week to training seven days a week, and twice a day. By the mid 1950s, he was competing in ultramarathons.

In the 1955 London to Brighton Road Race, Hopcroft came third behind Tom Richards and Bill Kelly in a time of 5:47:11. The following year, he won the race in 5:36:26, beating Richards who came second, and Kelly third. But in 1957, he was beaten into second place in 5:40:31 by the South African Gerald Walsh, while Kelly finished third again.

=== 100 mile World Record attempts ===
Wally Hayward set the 100 mile record of 12:20:28 in 1953. Five years later, at 5am on 25 October 1958, Hopcroft set out on the 100-mile route from Hyde Park Corner in central London along the Bath Road to the village of Box. He was accompanied for the first five miles by John Legge and Bill Wortley, who intended to go the whole way, but they dropped off and he carried on alone. He passed the marathon distance in 3:02 and reached the halfway mark in 5:46:37. With five miles to go, Hopcroft had 48 minutes to complete the course inside the world record time. Accompanied by motorists, cyclists and other runners, and cheered on by spectators, with encouragement from Percy Cerutty, he pushed on and crossed the finish line in 12:18:16.

A year later, almost to the day, on 24 October 1959, the Road Runners Club organised an event to beat Hopcroft's record on twenty laps of a five mile circuit at Walton-on-Thames. Twelve runners, including Hopcroft set out at 4am. Although the leaders were two minutes ahead of Hopcroft's pace at the 30-mile mark, Arthur Mail won the race in 13:17:39. Hopcroft did not complete the race.

Jackie Mekler, who had come second to Hayward in the 1953 100 mile race, set a new record for the London to Brighton race in 1960. Three weeks later he set out on a solo attempt to beat Hopcroft's 100 mile record, Hopcroft pacing him for the first 10 miles. At the marathon mark, Mekler was just two minutes behind Hopcroft's pace. But he reached the half way mark in 6:08:06, more than twenty minutes behind the pace, suffering with knee and Achilles pain, and gave up.

=== Retirement ===
After 20 years competing for Thames Valley Harriers, business, family commitments and an ankle injury ended Hopcroft's running career in 1961. He stayed with the club as Road Running Secretary, developing a strong road running section. He was then President of the club from 1970 to 1973 and again from 1986 to 1988. He also volunteered as a track and cross-country official, acting as timekeeper at Veterans Athletic Club events, until 2007.
