= Newham and Essex Beagles A.C. =

British athletics club

- Founded: 1887
- Ground: London Marathon Community Track
- Location: Queen Elizabeth Olympic Park, Marshgate Lane, London E20 8ST, England
- Coordinates: 51°32′12″N 0°00′56″W
- Website: official website

Newham and Essex Beagles Athletic Club is an athletics club in southeast England. The club competes in the British Athletics League and Southern League along with the National Junior League and Youth Development League for competitors under the ages of 20 and 17.

== History ==
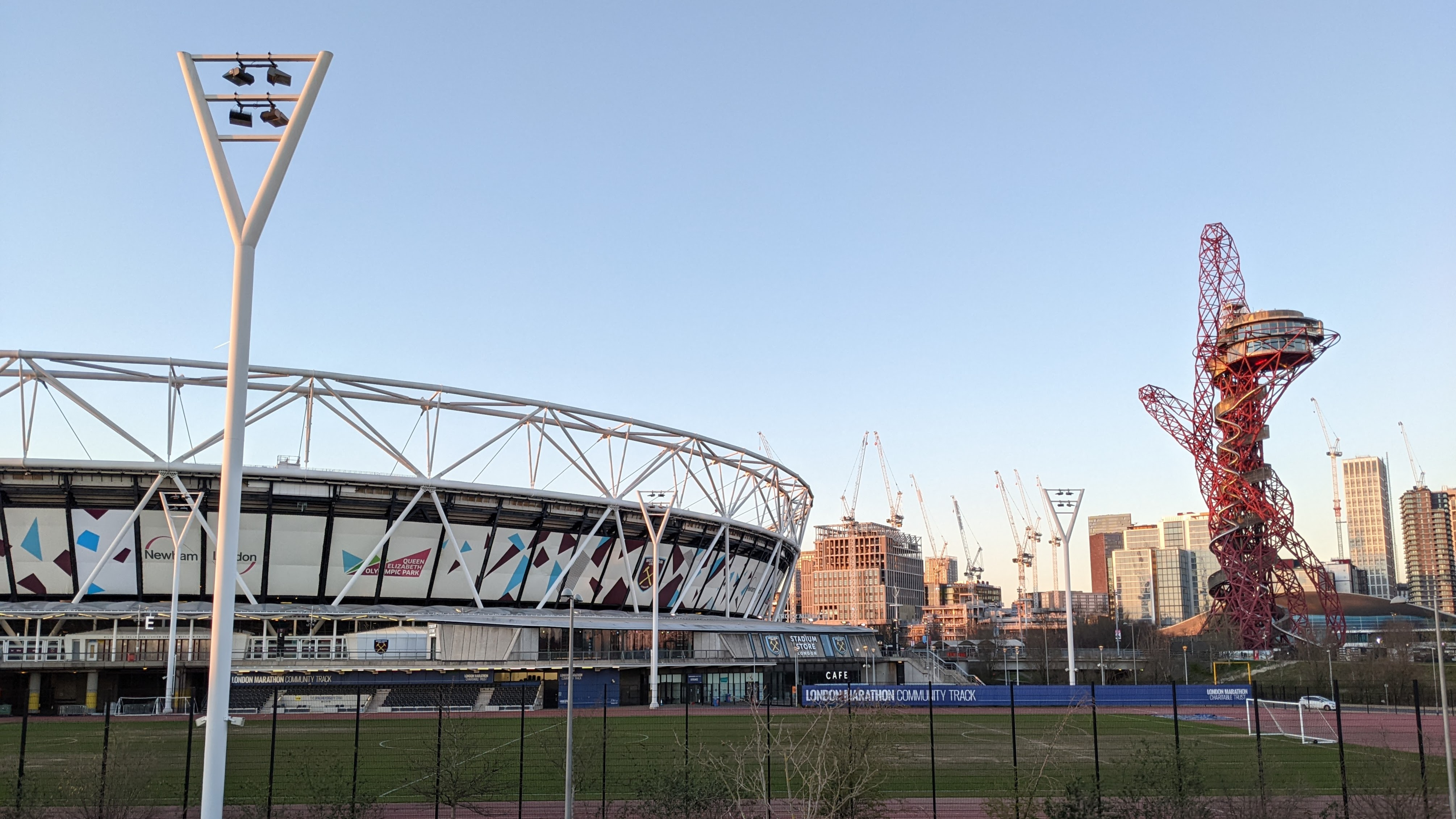
The London Marathon Community Track in the foreground with the Olympic Stadium behind

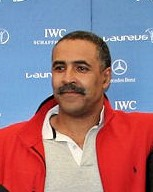
Daley Thompson

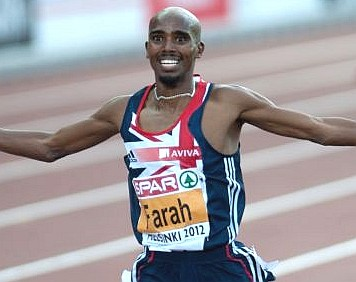
Mo Farah

The club was formed in 1887 as the Beaumont Harriers but became the Essex Beagles in July 1891.

In 1985, Essex Beagles merged with Newham Athletic Club, when it moved from Barking to the Terence McMillan Stadium (named after Terence Mcmillan the first charter mayor of Newham 1965–1966) in the London Borough of Newham, East London. The opening meeting of the synthetic track was on 26 July 1985. It was resurfaced with Polytan PUR in 1995.

The Newham club was extremely close to the site of the 2012 Olympic Games and a number of athletes competed at the event.

In April 2018 the club moved from the Terence McMillan Stadium to the London Marathon Community Track in Queen Elizabeth Olympic Park adjacent to the London Stadium.

== Honours ==
Senior Men:

- British Athletics League (First Place:2008, 2009, 2010; Second Place:1979, 1998, 2000, 2003, 2012; Third Place: 1980, 1981)
- English National Cross Country Championships (Winners: 2009)

== Notable athletes ==
=== Olympians ===
Athlete	Club	Events	Games	Medals/Ref
Billy Saward	Essex Beagles	marathon	1900	
William Taylor	Essex Beagles	marathon	1900	
Jim Peters	Essex Beagles	marathon	1952	
Daley Thompson	Essex Beagles	decathlon	1976, 1980, 1984, 1988	Gold medal Gold medal
Richard Slaney	Essex Beagles	discus throw	1984	
Paul Head	Newham & Essex Beagles	hammer throw	1992	
Jason John	Newham & Essex Beagles	4 × 100 m	1992	
Alison Thorogood	Newham & Essex Beagles	canoeing	1992, 1996	
Matt Yates	Newham & Essex Beagles	1500 m	1992	
Gary Jennings	Newham & Essex Beagles	400 m hurdles	1996	
Iwan Thomas	Newham & Essex Beagle	400 metres, 4 × 400 m relay	1996, 2000	Silver medal
Damien Greaves	Newham & Essex Beagles	110 m hurdles	2000	
Michael East	Newham & Essex Beagles	1500 metres	2004	
Chris Tomlinson	Newham & Essex Beagles	long jump	2008	
Tyrone Edgar	Newham & Essex Beagles	100 metres	2008	
Erison Hurtault	Newham & Essex Beagles	400 metres	2008, 2012	
Christine Ohuruogu	Newham & Essex Beagles	400 m, 4 × 400 m relay	2008, 2012, 2016	Gold medal Silver medal
Mo Farah	Newham & Essex Beagles	5000 m, 10,000 m	2008, 2012, 2016	Gold medal Gold medal Gold medal Gold medal
Steven Lewis	Newham & Essex Beagles	pole vault	2008, 2012	
Abdul Buhari	Newham & Essex Beagles	discus throw	2012	
James Ellington	Newham & Essex Beagles	200 metres	2012	
Mumin Gala	Newham & Essex Beagles	5000 m, marathon	2012, 2016	
Robbie Grabarz	Newham & Essex Beagles	high jump	2012, 2016	
Lee Merrien	Newham & Essex Beagles	marathon	2012	
Rabah Yusuf	Newham & Essex Beagles	400 metres	2012	
Nethaneel Mitchell-Blake	Newham & Essex Beagles	200 m, 4 × 100 m	2016, 2020	
Asha Philip	Newham & Essex Beagles	100 m, 4 × 100 m	2016, 2020	

=== Other ===
Athlete	Club	Notes
Max Eaves	Newham & Essex Beagles	2010 Commonwealth Games bronze
Ryan Scott	Newham & Essex Beagles	2010 Commonwealth Games gold
JJ Jegede	Newham & Essex Beagles	2012 European Athletics Championships 4th

== Club kit ==
The club kit consists of a black vest, with a gold horizontal hoop and a yellow vest, with the word Newham in black. The British Men's league kit is designed by Asics.
