= Leonard Hurst =

British distance runner (1871–1937)

Len Hurst
- Len Hurst wins 1896 Paris Marathon. Depicted on the front page of Le Petit Journal, 2 August 1896.
- Born: 28 December 1871; Kent
- Died: 22 November 1937 (aged 65); Kent
- Occupations: Brick-maker, Athlete
- Known for: 1896, 1900, 1901 – Paris marathon winner, 1901 – 25-mile World Champion, 1903 – 25-mile World record, 1900 – (probable) 50 km world record.

Len Hurst (28 December 1871 – 22 November 1937) was renowned as a British long-distance athlete, both running and pedestrianism, although he started life as a brick-maker, and spent his last 29 years as a pub landlord.

Hurst won his first adult race in 1887 at the age of 15, whereby the prize of £10 qualified him as 'professional'. In 1896 he won the inaugural Paris Marathon and went on to repeat the victory in both 1900 and 1901.

In 1901 he won the professional 25-mile (40 km) world championships in London, and in 1903 he broke the world 25-mile (40 km) record.

== Early life ==
Len Hurst was born in Kent, England, where he trained as a brick-maker. Hurst won his first adult race in 1887 at the age of 15. The prize of £10 for the 6 km (3.7 mi) race qualified him as 'professional'. At the beginning of his career, Hurst ran shorter races; however, switching to longer distances in 1893, Hurst covered 294 km (183 mi) during a four-day event. (Note: On this point, Noakes notes: "7.5 hours of running each day".)

His brother Joe was also a runner, finishing sixth in the 1896 Paris Marathon and acting as team-mate with Len in the English team at the Madison Square Garden Six Day Walk in 1902. The New York Times reported both Len and Joe as residents of Edmonton, London in 1902.

== Paris Marathon ==
On 18 July 1896 the inaugural Paris Marathon was organised by Pierre Giffard on behalf of Le Petit Journal. The event followed on from the success of the marathon in the 1896 inaugural Olympics in Athens. Giffard started the race before a large crowd at Porte Maillot, and it followed a course to Versailles and finished in front of 2,000 spectators on the bridge over the river Seine in Conflans-Sainte-Honorine, an approximate distance of 40 km (25 mi). During the race his refreshments reportedly included orange-juice and a glass of champagne. Hurst earned the 200-franc prize in a winning time of 2:31:30; 27 minutes faster than the mark of 2:58:50 set by Spiridon Louis of Greece three months earlier at the first Olympic marathon in Athens, Greece on 10 April 1896. Set on courses shorter than the now-standardized distance of 42.195 km (26 miles 385 yards), the performances of Louis and Hurst were never officially recognised as world records in the marathon. (Note: The Association of Road Racing Statisticians has estimated the course distance for the first Olympic marathon to be 37–38 km. Johnny Hayes' 2:55:18.4 performance at the 1908 Summer Olympics in London is recognised as the first mark set at the modern marathon distance.)

1897 contemporary sources report Hurst finishing second behind F. Champion in the second running of the event; and again finishing second in 1899 behind A. Charbonnel.

In 1900 the race was run in the opposite direction, starting from Conflans-Sainte-Honorine and finishing at Porte Maillot in Paris. Hurst won this fifth event with a time of 2:26.48.

In 1901 he won the sixth edition in a time of 2 hours, 34 minutes 52 seconds.

== World champion and world record at 25 miles ==
On 23 September 1901 Hurst won the professional '25 Mile World Championships' which was held at the 'Tee-To-Tum' ground at Stamford Hill in London.

Two years later, on 27 August 1903 at the same track, Hurst set the professional world record of 2:32:42, for 25 mi (40 km), thus breaking George Dunning's amateur time of 2:33:44.0 which had stood since 1881. Hurst, a professional, was paced specifically to break Dunning's amateur mark.

== Other races ==
A month after winning the 1900 Paris marathon he ran a 50 km (31 mi) event in 3:36.45. (Note: Running historian Andy Milory consider this mark to have been a likely world record.)

In 1899 the South London Harriers organised the first London to Brighton run for amateurs. In 1903 the London Evening Standard organised a second event that was open to professionals. Along with 90 other runners Hurst participated in the 85 km (53 mi) race from the Houses of Parliament London to Brighton, setting off at 6 am and winning in 6 hours, 32 minutes 34 seconds, with a lead of 40 minutes over the second place runner. (See 'Commemoration' below.)

On 10 February 1902 The New York Times reported that Len and his brother Joe constituted the 'English team' in the Six Day Walk which started at Madison Square Gardens with an audience of 5,000. Forty-two teams started at midnight in... the six-day, "go as you please" pedestrian race. ... running, jogging, and walking in every variety of gait known to pedestrianism. ...each man to walk not more than 12 hours a day. The event was won by the Irish-American Pat Cavanaugh and Peter Hagelman.

On 20 July 1902 Len Hurst won a 1-hour walking race in Paris, covering 10.5 miles (16.9 km) and finishing ahead of the Frenchman Albert Charbonnell and fellow Englishman Mr Bacon.

On 30 Hakihea (December) 1903 the Otago Witness reported that Len Hurst would represent England at the Vélodrome Buffalo in Paris in the Fifty mile 'Go as you please' race for professional pedestrians of all nations. Each competitor was accompanied by two cyclists.

He was successful in a number of multi-day races including almost the last flourish of Six Day racing – the 2-man 6 Day relay of 1904.

== Training methods ==
Hurst's training consisted of 6 to 7 hours walking and running 10–30 km, spread over two sessions each day. In 1896 he was coached by Mr Boon.

In 1908 Hurst gave details of his training in a book written by Alf Downer. His training was devised for events from 15 to 50 miles (80 km), and he advised all long-distance runners to include any amount of walking exercise. His suggested daily programme was: Rise at six followed by a steady walk until 8:30. Breakfast. Rest until 9:45 then walk until 11 am followed by a three-mile (5 km) run. Dinner at 12:45 followed by a rest on a bed until 3 o’clock. An hour's walk followed by a three-mile (5 km) run. Tea at 5:30 followed by a walk from 6:30 to 8:30. Finally relaxation until bed at ten o’clock.

According to Tim Noakes, Hurst, like Charles Rowell, Arthur Newton, and Clarence DeMar, achieved greatness without much attention to speedwork.

== Death and commemoration ==
After retiring in 1908, Hurst managed a pub for the rest of his life. In 1937 at the age of 65, he died of cirrhosis of the liver.

Since the rebirth of the London to Brighton run in 1951, the 'Len Hurst belt' has been awarded to the winning team. This award is the actual championship belt awarded to Len Hurst in 1903. The winners include:

- 1951 Blackheath Harriers;
- 1952 Blackheath Harriers;
- 1953 Germiston Callies (S.A.);
- 1954 Blackheath Harriers;
- 1955 Blackheath Harriers;
- 1956 Belgrave Harriers;
- 1957 Hull Harriers;
- 1958 Thames Valley Harriers;
- 1959 Durban A.C.(S.A.);
- 1960 Thames Valley Harriers;
- 1961 Epsom & Ewell Harriers;
- 1962 Epsom & Ewell Harriers;
- 1963 Belgrave Harriers;
- 1964 Tipton Harriers;
- 1965 Cheltenham & C.Harriers;
- 1966 Thames Valley Harriers;
- 1967 Tipton Harriers;
- 1968 Thames Valley Harriers;
- 1969 Savages 'A' (S.A.);
- 1970 Tipton Harriers;
- 1971 Tipton Harriers;
- 1972 Tipton Harriers;
- 1973 Germiston Callies (S.A.);
- 1974 Tipton Harriers;
- 1975 Spring Striders (S.A.);
- 1976 Milrose AA N.Y. USA;
- 1977 South London Harriers;
- 1978 South London Harriers;
- 1979 Gloucester AC;
- 1980 Central Park Track Club, N.Y. USA;
- 1981 South London Harriers;
- 1982 Hillingdon AC;
- 1983 Woodstock Harriers;
- 1984 Leamington C & AC;
- 1985 Ranelagh Harriers;
- 1986 Crawley AC;
- 1987 Crawley AC;
- 1988 Crawley AC;
- 1989 Crawley AC;
- 1990 Crawley AC;
- 1991 Woodstock Harriers;
- 1992 Crawley Harriers;
- 1993 Woodstock Harriers;
- 1994 Collegian Harriers;
- 1995 Glengold Harriers (SA);
- 1996 Woodstock Harriers;
- 1997 Crawley AC;
- 1998 100 Kilometres Association;

== See also ==
- Pedestrianism
