= Carolyn Hunter-Rowe =

British ultramarathon runner

Carolyn Hunter-Rowe (born 25 January 1964) is a British ultramarathon runner. She was the 1996 winner of the IAU 100 km European Championships and won the IAU 100 km World Championships in 1993 and 1998.

Hunter-Rowe set seven British records in athletics between 1993 and 1994. Four of those records were set at the Barry 40 mile track race. In 1993 Hunter -Rowe won the London to Brighton setting the women's course record of 6:34:10. In 1994 Hunter-Rowe won the prestigious Two Oceans Marathon, a 56 km race held in Cape Town, South Africa. In 2002 she won the Dartmoor Discovery - a 52 km road race which starts and finishes in Princetown.

== Records ==
- 40 m 4:26:43 1993 Barry, Wales

Women's road 100 km record 7:27:19 Torhout, Belgium 1993

- 20 km 1:15:46.00 1994 Barry, Wales
- 25 km 1:35:15.5 1994 Barry, Wales
- 30 km 1:55:02.3 1994 Barry, Wales
- 50 km 3:18:52 1994 Barry, Wales
