= Road Runners Club (UK) =

- Formation: 14 June 1952
- Members: Approx 675 (as at 2019)
- Website: http://www.roadrunnersclub.org.uk

The Road Runners Club is an association of road runners formed in 1952 to encourage the athletic discipline of road running in the United Kingdom. Since then it has developed into a club that embraces the concept of assisting in the promotion of and training for road races and long distance track races. The most popular distances amongst current members are the half marathon and marathon for which much training advice is available to members. The club operates a unique club championship whereby members send in the verifiable results from any sanctioned race in the world and the results are entered throughout a calendar year. This has proved popular amongst all levels of ability and resulted in 280 championship entries for 2019. The club now embraces all runners from the park run to the marathon and ultra marathon competitors with comprehensive advice on its website.

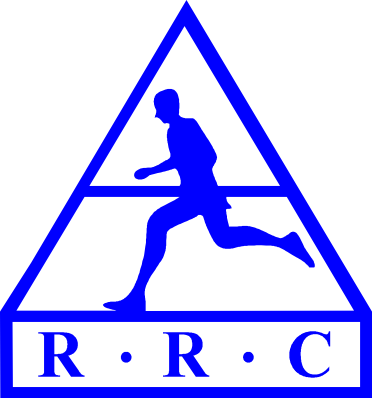
RRC Badge

Members are spread around the world with even some in Australia and many find the website a source of information on the practical issues of training.

== History ==
The RRC was founded under the leadership of Ernest Neville (1883–1972) as a result of the success of the London to Brighton road running race he had organised, and which took place on 11 August 1951 as part of the Festival of Britain celebrations. Ernest had a lot of previous experience of organising Road 'Walking' races from London to Brighton and was just as passionate about 'Road Running'.

The second London to Brighton Race was staged in 1952 and became an annual event until 2005 when organisational difficulties prevented its continuation on public roads. The exact distance varied over the years from 52 miles 694 yards to 55 miles due to road and course changes. Its "sister" race, the Comrades of South Africa, held over a similar distance, pre-dates RRC London to Brighton race (first race 1921), and continues to this day.

The main trophies at the London to Brighton race were the Arthur Newton trophy (named after another RRC founding member) for the winner and, for the first winning team, the "Len Hurst" belt (which had previously been won by the well-known pedestrian runner of the late 19th and early 20th Century), donated by his wife to the RRC.

In addition to the London to Brighton race the RRC has organised and sponsored various long distance track races when numerous records were set. These included 24-hour and 50-mile track races. Amongst the 100-mile track races were the following:

- 100-mile track World Best (11:38:54) - Cavin Woodward, October 1975, Tipton near Birmingham
- 100-mile track World Best (11:30:51) - Don Ritchie, October 1977, Crystal Palace, London
- 100-mile track World Best (11:28:03) - Oleg Kharitanov, October 2002, Crystal Palace, London

The club's success resulted in similar organisations being established elsewhere in the world, in particular the Road Runners Club of America, and RRCs in India, Korea, New Zealand and South Africa.

The club's badge was designed by a Harold Murrells and is based on the symbol for the Greek element air.

The RRC was important in developing accurate course measurement and procedures for the correct organisation of long distance Road and Track races. Both were pioneered by the late John Jewell. He is still acknowledged as a leading pioneer in this field by certified course measurers around the world. The race procedures he formulated are still also the basics with which races are organised worldwide.

John Jewell also initiated a "Standards Scheme" whereby members are awarded certificates for achieving set times over a range of distances. Over the years the scheme has been extended to include times for women and for Masters. John Trory, the general secretary since 2014, has introduced a unique form of championship where members compete in any officially measured and timed race in the world and enter their times in the annual competition which runs for a calendar year. Custom designed medals are awarded for first 3 places in each age and distance category and a large cup is awarded to the club's overall champion, being the member who acquired during the year the highest age graded percentage.

== Structure ==
The club's constitution states that the management of the club be vested in a council whose members are:

- President
- Past Presidents
- Up to 30 Vice-Presidents
- Honorary General Secretary
- Honorary Treasurer
- and up to 30 other members

=== Past Presidents ===
Past Presidents	First Claim Club	Term in Office
Rex Cross	Blackheath Harriers	1952–1953
Sam Ferris	Polytechnic Harriers	1954
Jim Peters	Essex Beagles	1955–1956
John Jewell	South London Harriers	1957–1958
Lew Piper	Blackheath Harriers	1959
Vic Fowle	Herne Hill Harriers	1960–1961
Tom Richards	South London Harriers	1962–1963
Ernest Neville	Blackheath Harriers	1964
Arthur Bourne	Liverpool Pembroke AC	1965–1966
Gordon Doubleday	Belgrave Harriers	1967–1969
Bernard Baldwin	Mountain Ash	1970
Mervyn Dunaway	Stock Exchange AC	1971–1972
Harold Lee	Orion Harriers	1973–1975
Brian Doughty	Manchester AC	1976–1977
Don Turner	Epsom and Ewell Harriers	1978–1979
Bob Pape	Royal Navy	1980–1981
Peter Goodsell	Walton AC	1982–1984
John Dixon	Epsom and Ewell Harriers	1985–1986
Ron Hill	Clayton-le-Moors Harriers	1987–1988
Alan Storey	Ranelagh Harriers	1989–1990
Ian Macintosh	City of Bath AC	1991–1992
John Gebbels	Herne Hill Harriers	1993–1994
Hilary Walker	Serpentine RC	1995–1997
Stephen Moore	Hertford and Ware AC	1998–2000
Don Ritchie MBE	Forres AC	2001–2003
David Bedford	Shaftesbury Harriers	2003–2006
Hugh Jones	Ranelagh Harriers	2007–2011
Ian Champion	RRC	2011–2022
Walter Hill		2022–

== Membership ==
Originally, only those (men) who were already members of running clubs affiliated to the National Governing Body of their own country were eligible to join the RRC (overseas members being allowed). Since the 1980s membership has been open to all men and women. There are currently (2019) around 675 members. The annual membership fee of only £12.50 has been held for more than 10 years and there are no reported plans for increasing this.

== Publications ==
- Roadrunner magazine. Published three times per year, each issue being A4 full colour and approx. 40 pages.
- Training For Ultras (1987, Revised edition published 2013. Various international level contributors, Edited by Andy Milroy) Available from Road Runners Club £10 plus postage
