= Thames Valley Harriers =

Athletics club in West London

- Founded: 1887
- Ground: Linford Christie Stadium
- Location: Wormwood Scrubs, West London, England
- Website: official website

Thames Valley Harriers (TVH) is an athletics club founded in 1887. It is based at the Linford Christie Stadium, in West London, England.

In track and field, TVH competes in the Premiership Division of the National Athletics League (NAL) as well as the Division 1 of the Southern Athletics League. The club has won all of its matches in the NAL since its inception in 2021 and is the sole winner of the Premiership trophy. The club also competes in road running and cross country at national, regional and county level.

== History ==
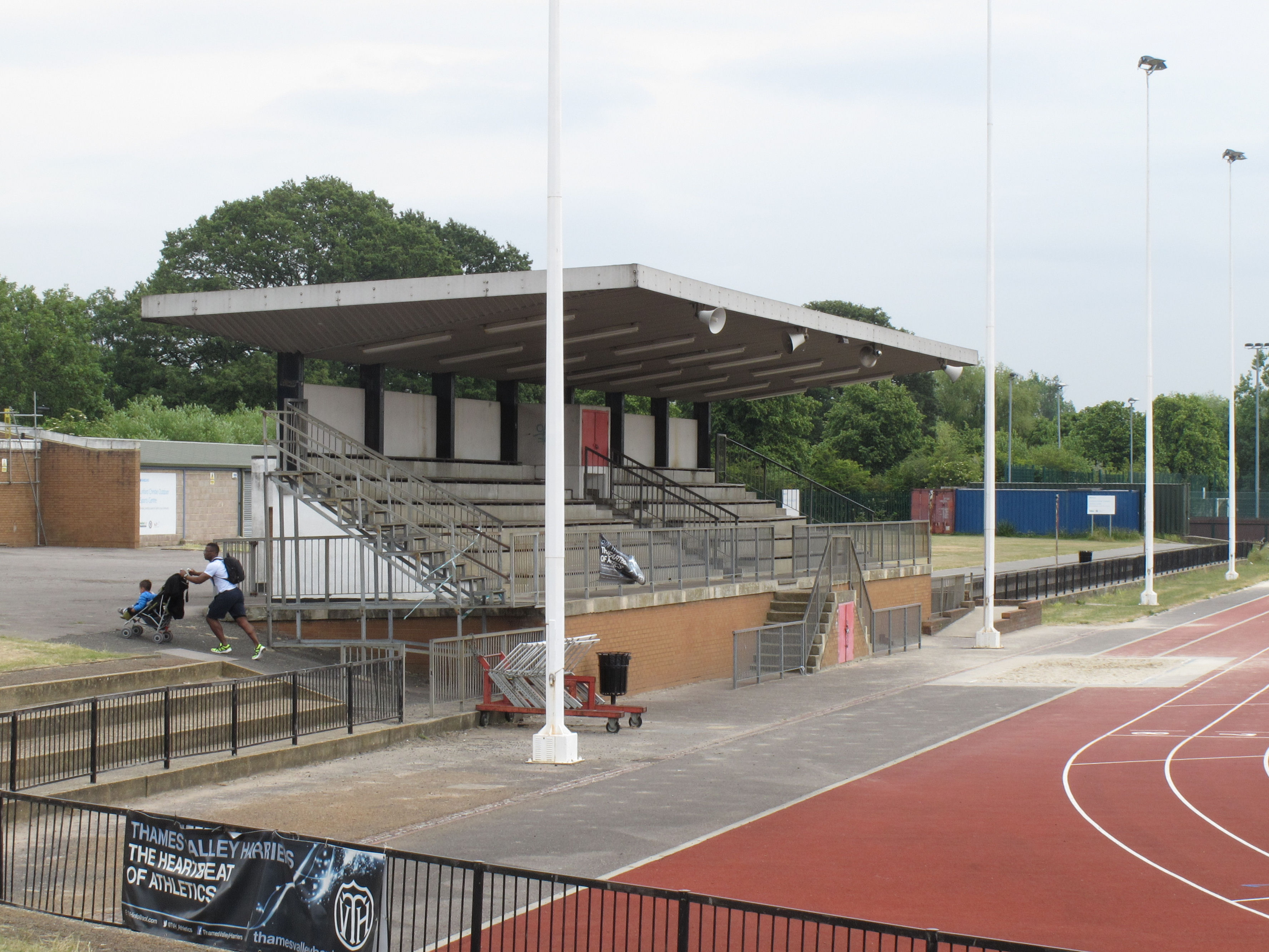
The Linford Christie Stadium

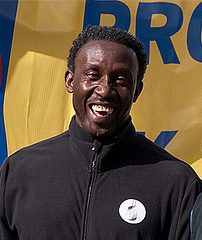
Linford Christie

Thames Valley Harriers is one of the UK's longest-established and most successful athletics clubs. It was founded in 1887 by seven aspiring cross-country runners who used the 'Peels' coffee house in Richmond Road, West London as a base for their training runs. Christened the Twickenham Harriers, the club flourished and to reflect its widening horizons took the name Thames Valley Harriers on 14 November 1890.

TVH became a force both on the track and in endurance races. The 1908 Summer Olympics at nearby White City Stadium increased the club's profile and a first Olympian was secured in 1936 when George Traynor competed in the long jump alongside Jesse Owens.

Other standout performers included Ken Norris who finished second in the 1954 world cross country championships and Ron Hopcroft who set world records for both the 50 and 100 miles. TVH was also the club where middle-distance coach Frank Horwill first developed his methods, including the creation of the British Milers Club in 1963.

TVH was a founding member of the British Athletics League in 1969 and enjoyed great success over the next two decades, winning the title three times and finishing in the top three on a total of 14 occasions, as well as achieving multiple wins in the Southern road relays and cross country championships.

This success provided the momentum for the club to build a new clubhouse at the West London Stadium by Wormwood Scrubs, which was completed in 1979. From this platform emerged TVH's greatest ever athlete – Linford Christie - who claimed a haul of international sprint medals including 1992 Olympic 100 m gold in Barcelona. The West London Stadium was renamed the Linford Christie Stadium in his honour and he still serves as the Club President.

In recognition of the club's success and TVH's record of strong contribution to its local community, England Athletics voted Thames Valley Harriers the top London club for 2015.

2021 saw the launch of a new National Athletics League, combining the former British Athletics League (BAL) for men and UK Women's Athletics League (UKWAL) into one competition. Thames Valley Harriers won all four of the club's matches to win the inaugural title. In 2024, the club won the National Athletics League for the fourth consecutive year.

== Honours ==
- National Athletics League, Premiership winners: 2021, 2022, 2023, 2024, 2026
- British Athletics League, champions 1970, 1971, 1994
- UK Women's Athletic League, champions 2015, 2017, 2018, 2019
- European Club Champions Cup, champions 2016

== Olympic athletes ==
Athlete	Country	Events	Olympics	Medals
George Traynor	(United Kingdom)	long jump	1936	
Alec Olney	(United Kingdom)	5000 metres	1948	
Michael Denley	(United Kingdom)	javelin throw	1952	
Ken Norris	(United Kingdom)	10000 metres	1956	
David Segal	(United Kingdom)	100 metres, 200 metres, 4 × 100 metres relay	1956, 1960	Bronze medal
Jimmy Omagbemi	(Nigeria)	200 metres, 4 × 100 metres relay	1960, 1964	
Mike Wiggs	(United Kingdom)	1500 metres	1960, 1964	
Alf Meakin	(United Kingdom)	100 metres	1960	
Dick Steane	(United Kingdom)	200 metres	1964	
Martin Reynolds	(United Kingdom)	400 metres, 4 × 400 metres relay	1972	Silver medal
Steve Green	(United Kingdom)	4 × 100 metres relay	1980	
Rod Milne	(United Kingdom)	4 × 400 metres relay	1980	
Clifford Mamba	(Eswatini)	100 metres, 200 metres	1984	
Linford Christie	(United Kingdom)	100 metres, 4 × 100 metres relay	1988, 1992, 1996	Gold medal Silver medal Silver medal
Julian Golley	(United Kingdom)	triple jump	1992	
Sanusi Turay	(Sierra Leone)	100 metres, 4 × 100 metres relay	1992, 1996	
Ambwene Simukonda	(Malawi)	400 metres	2012	
Lorraine Ugen	(United Kingdom)	long jump	2016, 2020	
Zoey Clark	(United Kingdom)	4 × 400 metres relay	2020	
Ricardo dos Santos	(Portugal)	400 metres	2020	
Muhammad Abdallah Kounta	(France)	4 x 400 metres relay,	2024	
Molly Caudery	(United Kingdom)	Pole Vault	2024	
Bianca Williams	(United Kingdom)	200 metres, 4 x 100 metres	2024	Silver medal

== Commonwealth Games athletes ==
Athlete	Events	Games	Medals
Peter Clark	3 miles	1958	
Colin Smith	javelin throw	1958, 1962	Gold medal Silver medal
