= Don Ritchie (runner) =

Scottish ultramarathon runner (1944–2018)

Donald Alexander Ferguson Ritchie (6 July 1944 – 16 June 2018) was a Scottish ultramarathon runner.

== Biography ==
He was born in 1944 at Haddo House, Aberdeenshire, which was then being used as a wartime maternity hospital. His parents were Alec Ritchie and Rachel (née Ferguson).

Initially as a runner he was encouraged to race the quarter-mile but soon drifted towards longer distances and was supported by Peter Duffy and Alastair Wood, both established endurance athletes. Ritchie's first ultra event was the 36 mile Two Bridges race across the Forth and Kincardine bridges in 1970.

In 1977 and 1978, he won the London to Brighton Race.

Ritchie ran 100 miles at the Crystal Palace track on 25 October 1977 in a time of 11:30:51. This was the fastest time ever recorded for 100 miles and stood as the record until 2002 when it was broken by Oleg Kharitonov, who ran 11:28:03 in a race held to celebrate the twenty-fifth anniversary of Ritchie’s performance.

In October 1978, Ritchie covered 100 km on the Crystal Palace track in 6:10:20, an average pace of under six minutes per mile. It was a world record for the distance which Ritchie held for the rest of his life. It was eventually broken a few days after his death when Nao Kazami ran 6:09:14 in the 2018 edition of the Lake Saroma 100 km road race.

Ritchie also set a world road record for 100 miles in 1979 with a time of 11:51:11 in a race at Flushing Meadows, and ten years later, he set the fastest time for running from John O' Groats to Land's End, completing the route in 10 days, 15 hours and 27 minutes.

In 1990 he ran at the global 24-hours championships which were held at a shopping centre in Milton Keynes. Ritchie won with 166 miles, which was an indoor world record.

During his running career, Ritchie also set world best times on the track at distances of 50 km (2:50:30 in 1979), 40 miles (3:48:35 in 1982) and 50 miles (4:51:49 in 1983). Although his running style was better suited to the track and road than the trails, he did record a victory on the latter surface in the 95 mile West Highland Way Race in 1991.

Ritchie was appointed as an MBE in the Queen’s Birthday Honours in 1995 for services to athletics. He died in 2018 at his home in Lossiemouth.
