= Shaun Meiklejohn =

South African marathon runner (born 1961)

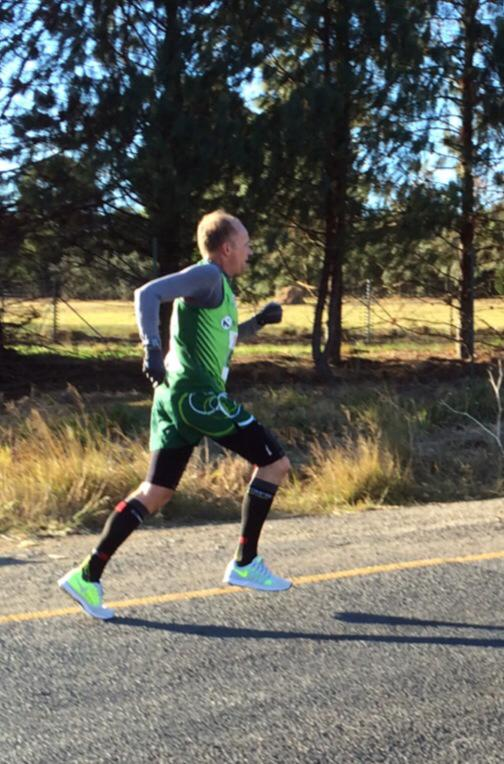
- Shaun Meiklejohn competing in the 2014 Mandela Marathon
- Born: 30 November 1961 (age 64); Pretoria, South Africa
- Education: University of Natal
- Occupation: Financial Director
- Known for: Comrades Marathon winner
- Website: www.meiklejohn.co

Shaun Meiklejohn (born 30 November 1961 in Pretoria, South Africa) is a South African marathon and ultra-marathon athlete, most widely known for his winning of the 1995 Comrades Marathon, the 89 km marathon between Durban & Pietermaritzburg. Before the 2014 race winner Bongmusa Mthembu, he was the most recent winner from the race province, KwaZulu-Natal. He has completed the race 33 times.

== Early life and education ==
Meiklejohn was brought up in Carletonville, where he graduated from Carleton Jones High School in 1979. In 1983 he obtained his Bachelor of Commerce in Accounting from the University of Natal.

== Running career and comeback ==
During the peak of his career, Shaun Meiklejohn earned 10 gold Comrades medals between 1989 and 1999, and a top 15 finish in the Two Oceans Ultra-marathon in 1994. "In 1994 he represented South Africa at the World 100km Champs in Japan, finishing fourth, a result he repeated a year later in the Netherlands. He also won the famous London to Brighton ultra in the UK in 1994." (Modern Athlete, 2010).

In 2010 he returned to the Comrades starting line for the 22nd time, after a seven-year break from running. His running career since then has been largely focused on raising money for charities such as the Amabeadiebeadie, the Red Cap Foundation, iThemba Projects, and the Pietermaritzburg Community Chest.

His performance in the 2013, 2014, and 2015 editions of the Comrades Marathons have seen him winning the Masters category, with Bruce Fordyce commenting in 2013 that Meiklejohn's run was "arguably the best performance of [the] year".

== Current life ==
As of 2014, he runs for a Pietermaritzburg-based running club, SAVE Orion Athletics, has started blogging about his training and charity work, and is a Director at a training & consulting company, Innovative Shared Services.
