= John Tarrant (runner) =

English long-distance runner

Personal information
- Nationality: British (English)
- Born: 4 February 1932 Shepherd's Bush, London
- Died: 18 January 1975 (aged 42) Hereford, England

Sport
- Sport: Athletics
- Event: long distance/marathon
- Club: Salford Harriers

John Tarrant (4 February 1932 – 18 January 1975) was an English long-distance runner, nicknamed "The Ghost Runner" .He was given the nickname for his habit of "gatecrashing" races from which he was barred due to his "non-amateur" status, acquired during a brief career as a teenage prize-fighter.

== Early life ==
John Tarrant was born in Shepherd's Bush, London, in 1932 to John and Edna (née Sorrell). During the Second World War, with his father away on active service, his mother died of tuberculosis. John and his younger brother Victor (born 1934) were raised in a children's home in Kent until his father was demobilised at the end of the war. In 1947 his father remarried, and the family moved to Buxton in the Peak District in Derbyshire.

== Sporting career ==
In 1950, at the age of 18, John took up boxing in Buxton, and earned a total of £17 at prize-fights in his local Town Hall. He did not much enjoy boxing, but found during his training that he had a talent for long-distance running. Accordingly, he gave up boxing the following year and turned his sights to training for the marathon, hoping to compete at the 1960 Summer Olympics in Rome, Italy.

In 1952 John applied to join the Salford Harriers in order to register with the Amateur Athletic Association of England. On being asked whether he had ever played sport for money, he chose to answer honestly and declared his brief career in prize-fighting. Due to the strict amateur code enforced at the time, he was immediately banned from competition for life.

Despite this setback, he continued to train, and (with the assistance of his brother Victor) began to gatecrash races to which he was officially refused entry, often out-performing recognised champions of the day. Nicknamed "The Ghost Runner" by the Press, his popularity eventually led to a relaxation of the ban against him: from 1958 he was permitted to compete nationally, but would remain ineligible to be selected for his country, and hence never competed at the Olympic Games.

Tarrant finished second behind Brian Kilby in the marathon event at the 1960 AAA Championships.

In the 1960s he turned to ultra-marathons, and set world records for 40-mile and 100-mile distances. In 1967 he became the first man ever to win the season's grand slam in Britain's four principal ultra-marathons (the London-to-Brighton, Isle of Man, Exeter-to-Plymouth, and Liverpool-to-Blackpool). While participating in the 90 km Comrades Marathon in South Africa in 1968 (in which he finished fourth), he became aware of the apartheid conditions there, and (as a white man) began to enter the first ever "multi-racial" races there as a form of support, notably winning the 80 km Goldtop Stanger-to-Durban race in 1970.

== Career wins and world records ==
Maindy Stadium (40 miles) 1966: World Record time 4 h 3 m 28 s.

Walton-on-Thames (100 miles) 1969: World Record time 12 h 31 m 10 s

Isle of Man (39 miles): Winner 1965–1967. Set course record in 1965 — time 4 h 11 m 26 s.

Exeter to Plymouth (44 miles): Winner 1965–1967. Set course record in 1967 — time 4 h 44 m 35 s.

Liverpool to Blackpool (48 miles): Winner 1965, 1967. Set course record in 1967 — time 4 h 55 m 56 s.

London to Brighton (52 miles): Winner 1967. Time 5 h 41 m 50 s.

Isle of Wight (Marathon): Winner in 1960–1962. Set course record of 2 h 26 m 44 s in 1962.

City of Liverpool (Marathon): Winner in 1960. Set course record time 2 h 22 m 35 s.

Salford Harriers (10 miles) track championship: Winner 1958–1966. Set course record 1963 time 51 m 35 s.

Roath, Cardiff (16 miles): Winner 1960, 1962, 1965, 1966 and twice in 1967.

Herefordshire County Championship (20 miles): Winner 1962–1964, 1966, 1967.

Newport (10 miles): Winner 1960, 1961, 1967.

Hereford to Ross-on-Wye (14 miles): Winner 1960, 1962. Broke course record each time.

South London Harriers (30 miles): Winner 1962, 1967.

Woodford to Southend (36 miles): Winner 1964.

Stanger to Durban Goldtop (50 miles): Winner 1970.

Herefordshire County (6 miles) track championship: Winner 1962, 1966, 1967.

National Championships (20 miles): Champion in 1960.

National Road Runners Club (Marathon): Champion in 1962.

National Territorial Army Championships (Cross Country): Champion in 1960, 1961.

== Private life ==
John Tarrant married in 1953, and with his wife Edie had a son, Roger. He lived most of his life in Derbyshire, South Africa and Hereford. He held various jobs over the years, including plumber's assistant, quarryman, and caretaker for the Territorial Army base in Hereford. He would occasionally give up one job for a lower-paying job, purely in order to have more time to train.

== Death ==
John Tarrant died in Hereford in 1975 of late-diagnosed stomach cancer, at the age of 42.

In July 2011, councillors in his final home town of Hereford commenced a campaign to raise a statue in his honour. The Ghost Runner Statue Campaign was started by Hereford runners and coaches Nikki Tyler and Lisa Ruck, who were coached themselves by John's brother Vic Tarrant, who was a great runner as well and voluntarily coached athletes in Hereford for 40 years. The statue was unveiled on 23 April 2019.
