= Frederick Randall =

British athlete

Personal information
- Nationality: British (English)
- Born: 5 February 1865 Enfield, London, England
- Died: 20 November 1946 (aged 81) Enfield, London, England

Sport
- Sport: Athletics
- Event: marathon
- Club: Finchley Harriers

Frederick Derek Randall (5 February 1865 – 20 November 1946) was a British track and field athlete who competed at the 1900 Summer Olympics in Paris, France.

== Biography ==
Randall was born in Enfield, London and was a member of Finchley Harriers. In 1892, Randall finished runner-up in the English National Cross Country Championships behind Herbert Heath.

He won the 1899 London to Brighton race, which earned selection for the marathon at the 1900 Olympic Games. However, he was one of six runners who did not finish the race, attributed to the warm weather on the day.

He died in Enfield, London.
