= History of the Comrades Marathon =

The Comrades Marathon was run for the first time on 24 May 1921 (Empire Day), and with the exception of a break during World War II, as well as the COVID-19 pandemic-impacted 2020 and 2021, has been run every year since. To date, over 300,000 runners have completed the race.

The race was the idea of World War I veteran Vic Clapham, to commemorate the South African soldiers killed during the war. Clapham, who had endured a 2,700-kilometre route march through sweltering German East Africa, wanted the memorial to be a unique test of the physical endurance of the entrants. The constitution of the race states that one of its primary aims is to "celebrate mankind's spirit over adversity". Vic Clapham's great-grandson, Antony Clapham, finished the race from 2012 to 2015, earning four Vic Clapham medals.

From 1962 to 1994 the race was run on Republic Day, 31 May. After this public holiday was scrapped in 1995 by the post-apartheid South African government, the race date was changed to Youth Day on 16 June. In 2007, the race organisers (controversially) bowed to political pressure from the ANC Youth League, who felt that the race diverted attention from the significance of Youth Day, and changed the race date to Sunday 17 June for 2007 and 15 June for 2008. In 2009 and 2010 the date was changed (to 24 May and 30 May respectively) to accommodate football's Confederations Cup (2009) and World Cup (2010) in South Africa. In 2020 and 2021, the race was cancelled due to the coronavirus pandemic.

== History by decade ==
=== 1920s ===
Forty-eight runners entered the first race in 1921, but only thirty-four elected to start. Most of them were former infantrymen. The course at the time was tarred only for the final few kilometres into Durban. A time limit of 12 hours was set and Bill Rowan became the inaugural winner, clocking 08:59 to win by 41 minutes ahead of Harry Phillips. Of the 34 starters, only 16 completed the race.

Arthur Newton entered and won the race for the first time in 1922. He went on to win the race five times and emerge as the dominant Comrades runner of the 1920s. When he completed the down run in 06:56 in 1923, there were only a handful of spectators on hand to witness the finish because so few thought it possible that the race could be run so quickly. The first woman to run the race was Frances Hayward in 1923, but her entry was refused, so she was an unofficial entrant. She completed the event in 11:35 and although she was not awarded a Comrades medal, the other runners and spectators presented her with a silver tea service and a rose bowl. In 1924 the Comrades had its fewest starters ever, just 24. Four years later, in 1928, the time limit for the race was reduced by an hour to 11 hours.

=== 1930s ===
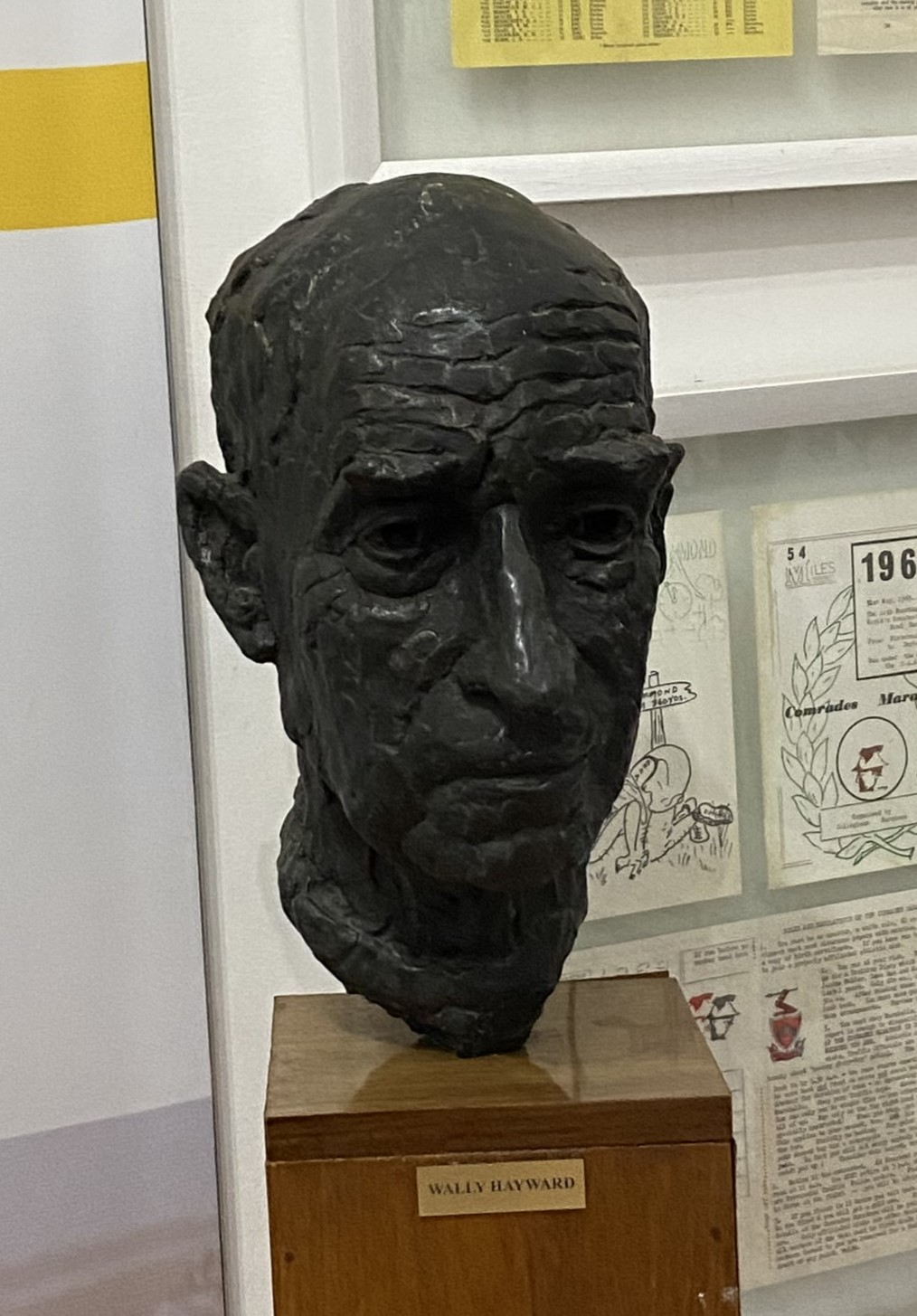
A bust of Wally Hayward displayed in the Comrades House

In the 1930s, Hardy Ballington emerged as the dominant runner, recording four victories in 1933, 1934, 1936 and 1938. The winner of the 1930 race, Wally Hayward, became one of the greatest legends of the Comrades Marathon, winning a further four times in the fifties, and becoming the oldest man to complete the race in 1989.

Robert Mtshali was the first unofficial black runner, running in the 1935 Comrades Marathon and finishing his race in a time of 9 hours and 30 minutes. His efforts were not officially recorded as government and race rules of the time stipulated that, in order to compete in the Comrades Marathon, you had to be a white male. Friday, 24 May 1935, saw Mtshali participating in the 15th Comrades Marathon, a down run, joining the 48 official entrants on the starting line. He ran unofficially, but was warmly welcomed into the Durban finish venue on the then Old Fort Road track grounds (now KE Masinga Road) by the crowds of supporters and spectators. The runner clocked his time of 9:30 and was awarded a special presentation by Councillor V.L. Shearer. He was one of only 35 finishers.In 1932 Geraldine Watson, an unofficial entrant, became the first woman to complete both the up run and the down run.

=== 1940s ===
After Ballington's domination of the 1930s, Comrades was stopped during the war years from 1941 to 1945. In 1948 a Comrades tradition was born when race official Max Trimborn, instead of firing the customary starter's gun, gave a loud imitation of a cock's crow. That tradition continues to the present day with Trimborn's recorded voice played over loudspeakers at the starting line.

=== 1950s ===
In the 1950s, a full twenty years after he won the race for the first time, Wally Hayward recorded his second victory and followed that up with wins in 1951, 1953 and 1954. He represented South Africa at the 1952 Olympic Games in Helsinki, where he finished tenth in the marathon. Hayward retired from the Comrades after establishing new records for both the up and down runs and equalling the five wins of Newton and Ballington. In 1958, the race was won for the first time by Jackie Mekler, who went on to win the race five times, finishing second twice and third twice.

=== 1960s ===
In the 1960s, Comrades grew considerably, from 104 starters in 1960 to 703 starters in 1969. Due to the bigger fields, cut-off points were introduced at Drummond and Cato Ridge. Mekler became the first man to break the six-hour barrier in 1960, finishing in 5:56:32. The 1961 winner was George Claassen, a school principal and father of well-known Wynand Claassen, Springbok rugby captain during 1981–83. Claassen junior also finished the Comrades ten times in later years.

In 1962, the race attracted foreign entries for the first time as the Road Runners Club of England sent over four of the best long-distance runners in Britain. English runner John Smith won the race, an up run, in under six hours, missing out on the course record by 33 seconds. Watching the stragglers come in hours later, Smith commented to former winner Bill Cochrane that the other people completing the race were getting as much applause as he had received. "You are now witnessing the spirit of the Comrades," replied Cochrane.

In 1965, English runner Bernard Gomersall broke Mekler's down run record with a time of 5:51:09.

In 1967, Manie Kuhn and Tommy Malone were involved in the closest finish in the history of the race. Malone appeared to be on his way to a comfortable win and was handed the traditional message from the Mayor of Pietermaritzburg to the Mayor of Durban at Tollgate with a lead of two minutes over Kuhn. He entered the stadium in the lead with only 80 metres left to go. Suddenly Kuhn appeared only 15 metres behind and closed in quickly. Malone put in a burst for the line, but with only 15 metres left he fell to the ground with cramps. He attempted to get up again, but with the line within reach Kuhn flew past to grab victory. The mayoral message was forgotten as both runners embraced.

=== 1970s ===
The Comrades had over 1,000 starters for the first time in 1971, with over 3,000 in 1979. The race was widely broadcast on both radio and television. The race was opened to all athletes for the first time in 1975, allowing blacks and women to take part officially. In 1975, the Golden Jubilee of the Comrades, Vincent Rakabele finished 20th to become the first black runner to officially win a medal. Elizabeth Cavanaugh became the first women's winner in a shade over 10 hours.

1976 saw the emergence of Alan Robb, who won the first of his four Comrades titles. Robb repeated his win in 1977, 1978 and 1980, including breaking the tape in Durban in 1978 in a record 5:29:14, almost 20 minutes and four kilometres ahead of runner-up Dave Wright.

=== 1980s ===
During the 1980s the Comrades began with a field of 4,207 in 1980 and topped 5,000 for the first time in 1983.

In 1980, Olive Anthony became the first black woman finisher of the race in 9:10. She ran the race 22 times, including in 1983 while she was three months pregnant and also in 2010 with her husband and two daughters.

Twenty-year old Isavel Roche-Kelly was named the UCT Sportsperson of the Year for 1980. An unknown on the athletics scene, Roche-Kelly set the roads alight that year when she became the first woman to break the 71/2-hour barrier and win the Comrades Marathon in 7:18:00; well under the silver-medal cut-off of 7:30:00, and in the process shattering the women's record by more than an hour. Earlier that year she also became only the third women in Africa to complete a marathon in under three hours. She went on to win the 1981 Comrades up run in a time of 6:44:35 the following year. Three years later she died in a cycling accident in her native Northern Ireland at the age of 24.

In 1981, University of the Witwatersrand student Bruce Fordyce won the first of his eventual nine Comrades titles. An outspoken critic of apartheid, Fordyce and a number of other athletes initially decided to boycott the 1981 event when organisers announced that they would associate it with the 20th anniversary of the Republic of South Africa. Fordyce ultimately competed wearing a black armband to signal his protest. He repeated his victories in 1982, 1983, 1984, 1985, 1986 (a record 5:24:07 down run), 1987, 1988 (a record 5:27:42 for the up run), and 1990.

In 1989, Sam Tshabalala became the first black winner of the Comrades.

Schoolteacher Frith van der Merwe won the woman's race in 1988 in a time of 6:32:56. In 1989, Van der Merwe ran 5:54:43, obliterating the women's record and finishing fifteenth overall.

In the same year Wally Hayward entered the race at the age of 79 and finished in 9:44:15. He repeated the feat in the 1989 Comrades, where he completed the race with only two minutes to spare and at the age of 80 became the oldest man to complete the Comrades.

=== 1990s ===
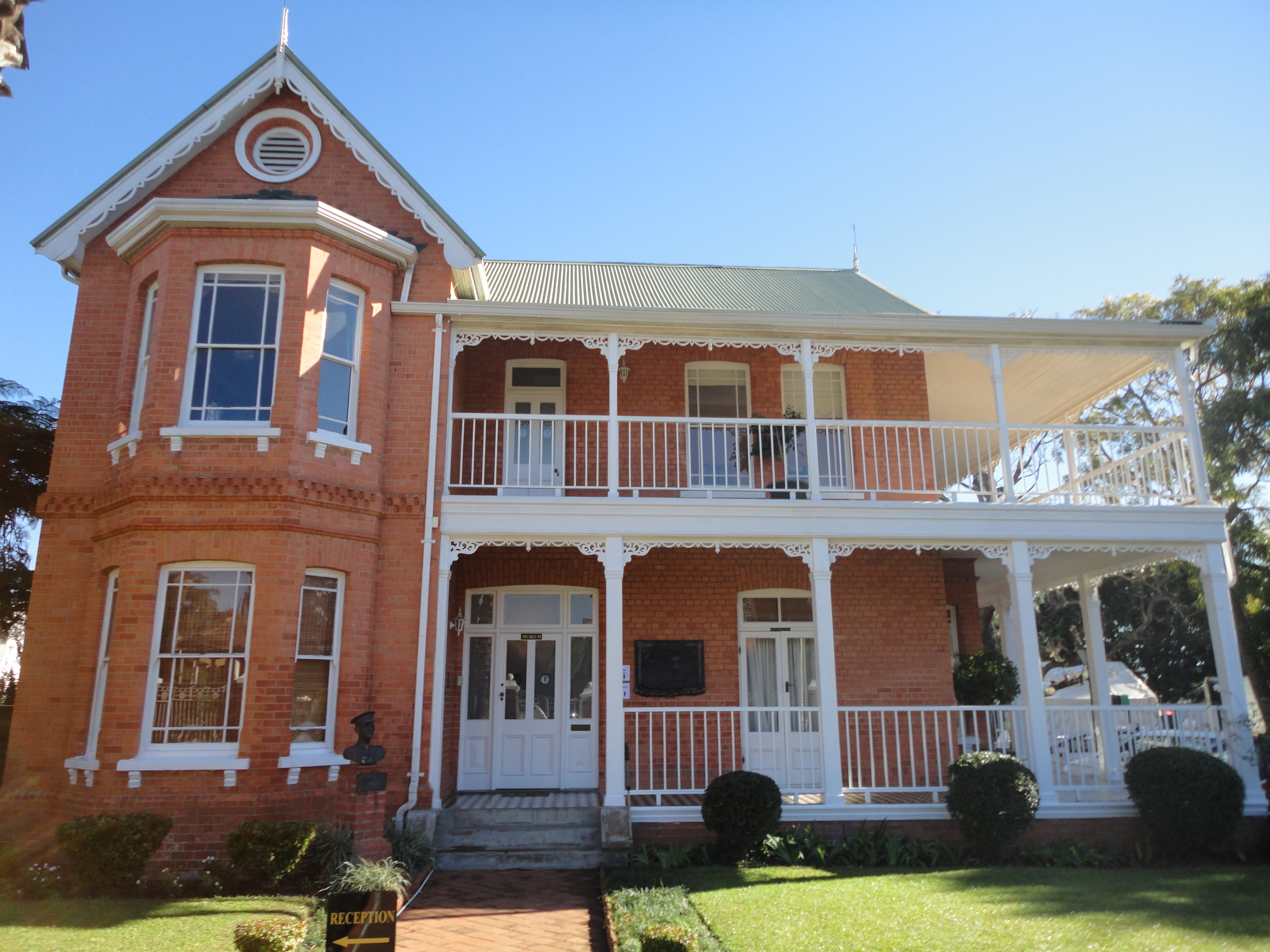
Comrades Marathon House, the CMA's headquarters in Pietermaritzburg where race statistics and memorabilia are kept

During the 1990s the size of the starting fields was in the region of 12,000 to 14,000 runners. In 1995 prize money was introduced, attracting more foreign competitors. The traditional race day of 31 May, formerly Republic Day, was changed to 16 June, the anniversary of the Soweto uprising.

In 1992 Charl Mattheus, crossed the finish line first, but was later disqualified after testing positive for a banned substance. He claimed it was contained in medicine he had taken for a sore throat, but Jetman Msutu was elevated to the winner, thus becoming the second black winner of the Comrades. In a sad twist for Mattheus, not long after the 1992 race, the substance for which he was banned was removed from the World Athletics' banned substance list since all evidence pointed to it having no performance enhancing properties. Mattheus also suffered much negativity in the public eye but later managed to redeem his clean image with an emphatic faultless win in the 1997 down run beating a strong local and international field.

=== 2000s ===
The 75th anniversary of the Comrades Marathon in 2000 was the largest ever staged, with a massive field of 23,961. An extra hour was allowed to allow runners some recovery time for bronze medal finishers to celebrate the milestone. In 2010, on its 85th anniversary, the race gained a place in the Guinness World Records as the ultramarathon with most runners. 14,343 athletes, the largest field since the turn of the millennium, finished in the allowed 12 hours.

Russian runner Leonid Shvetsov set both down and up course records in 2007 and 2008, respectively. Stephen Muzhingi became the first non-South African winner from Africa in 2009.

=== 2010s ===
Russian identical twin sisters Olesya and Elena Nurgalieva won a combined ten Comrades titles from 2003 to 2013. Stephen Muzhingi also became the first athlete to win three races in a row (2009, 2010 and 2011) since Bruce Fordyce won three in a row in the eighties (1981, 1982 and 1983).

South African supremacy over the men's race was restored when Ludwick Mamabolo won the down run in 2012. David Gatebe shattered the men's down record in 2016, while Bongmusa Mthembu has won three titles. Among the women, the Nurgalieva twins' hold on the race was finally broken in 2014 when Ellie Greenwood, GBR, won the down run after a spectacular finish, taking the lead just 2 km before the end. In 2015 Caroline Wostmann became the first South African woman to win Comrades in 17 years, followed by Charné Bosman in 2016 and Ann Ashworth in 2018. In 2017, American Camille Herron, led from start-to-finish to become only the 3rd American and first in 20 years to win.

=== 2020s ===
The 2020 in-person edition of the race was cancelled due to the coronavirus pandemic, with foreign registrants given the option of transferring their entry to 2021 or 2022. (Note: An announcement was first made on 2020.04.17 that the race was postponed, before the announcement was made on 2020.05.14 that the race was cancelled.) Similarly, the 2021 in-person edition of the race was also cancelled due to the pandemic.

The 2022 Comrades down run was the first in-person event following the COVID-19 pandemic. It was the 95th event since its inception in 1921, and the event slogan was "The Return – Sishay' Ibuya". Legislation concerning mass participation events limited the number of entrants to 15,000, and preference was given to those who had entered the cancelled 2020 race. The KwaZulu-Natal Sports Department confirmed that two athletes died following the race.

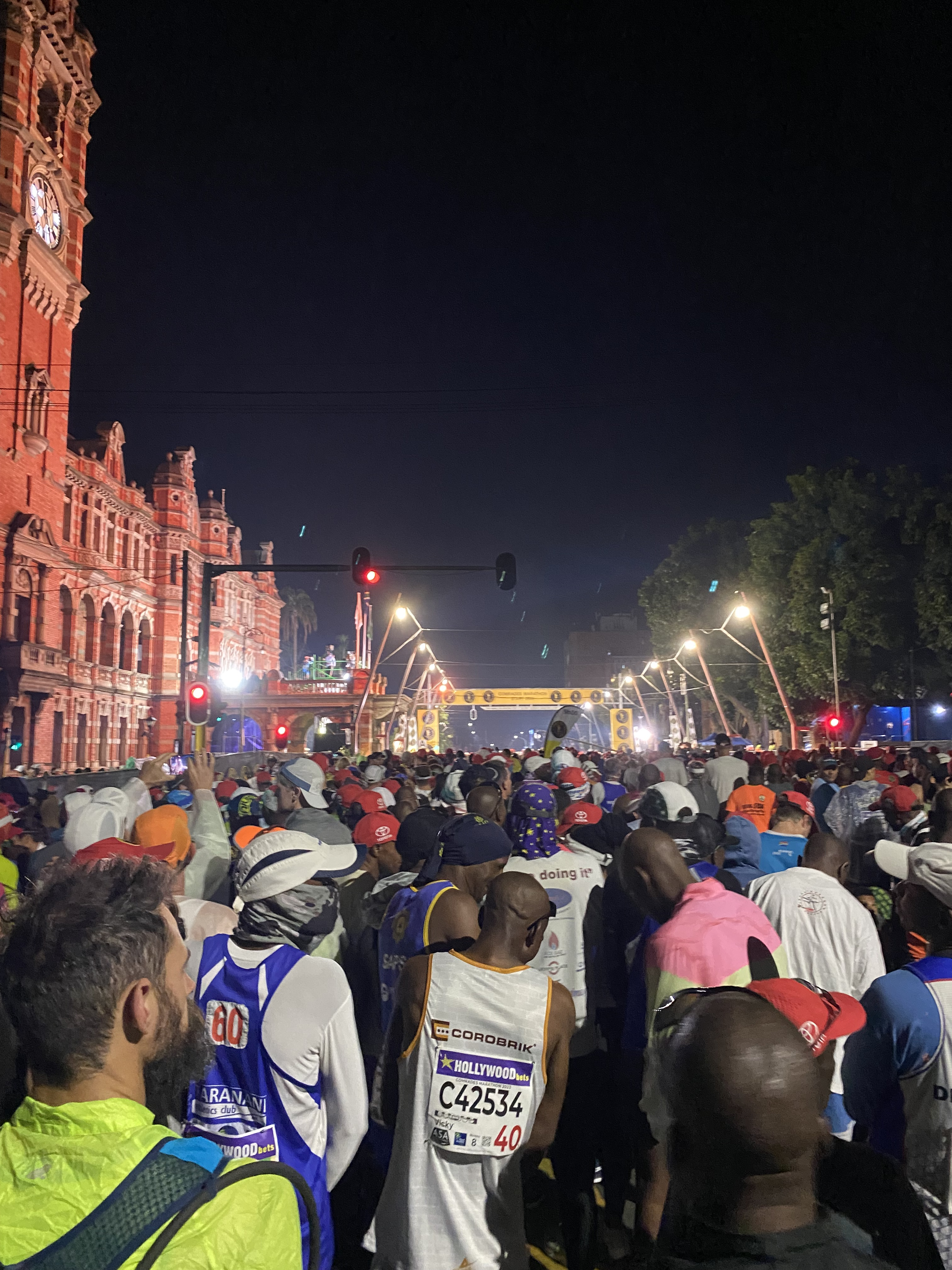
Runners waiting for the start of the 2023 Comrades Marathon

The post-pandemic period was marked by a series of record-breaking performances and repeat winners. Tete Dijana became the dominant men's down-run athlete of the decade, winning the 2022, 2023 and 2025 down runs. In 2023 he set the men's down-run and overall Comrades record of 5:13:58, breaking the previous down-run record set by David Gatebe in 2016. He reclaimed the title in the 2025 down run in 5:25:27 after a close contest with Piet Wiersma.

Gerda Steyn became the dominant women's athlete of the decade. She won the race in 2019, then won four consecutive editions from 2023 to 2026. In 2023 she set a new women's down-run record of 5:44:54, and in 2024 she set a new women's up-run record of 5:49:46. In 2026 she won her fifth Comrades title, becoming only the second woman after Elena Nurgalieva to win the race five times, and improved the women's up-run record to 5:44:53.

The decade also saw the emergence of Dutch runner Piet Wiersma as one of the leading international men's competitors. Wiersma finished second on his Comrades debut in the 2023 down run, three seconds behind Dijana, won the 2024 up run in 5:25:00, and again finished second in 2025 and 2026. In 2026, George Kusche won the men's race on his first up run, finishing in 5:15:56 and breaking Leonid Shvetsov's long-standing men's up-run record of 5:24:49, set in 2008.

== Cheating in the race ==
In 1993, Herman Matthee, a runner from Bellville athletics club, finished in 7th place and was one of the top ten gold medal winners, but he was later stripped of his gold medal and disqualified when video evidence and eyewitness testimony indicated that he entered the race at Kloof and completed less than 30 km of the 89 km down run. Consequently, in a Comrades first, 11th-place finisher Simon Williamson was months later promoted to tenth place and awarded the last gold medal by the then South African president FW de Klerk. Williamson had passed another runner, Ephraim Sekothlong, in the last 100 metres to claim 11th spot and, unknowingly, a gold medal.

In 1999, the Motsoeneng brothers from Bethlehem, Free State, who strongly resembled one another, performed an act of cheating during another down run. By exchanging places with his brother at toilet stops and aided by car lifts at various stages, Sergio Motsoeneng finished ninth, which came as a surprise to Nick Bester and other athletes behind him, who could not recall being overtaken. They were exposed when television footage revealed them to be wearing watches on different arms, and a time pad reading that confirmed that one of the brothers was still trailing Bester at Botha's Hill. The brothers performed well in later years, though Sergio tested positive for a banned substance after finishing third in 2010.

Use of banned substances is claimed to be endemic among top Comrades athletes, but only a small number have been disqualified. Runners who have tested positive include Sergio Motsoeneng, Rasta Mohloli, Viktor Zhdanov, Lephetesang Adoro and Ludwick Mamabolo. Mamabolo was found not guilty due to "technical irregularities". Erythropoietin (EPO), norandrosterone (a metabolite or precursor of nandrolone), methylhexaneamine and testosterone have been mentioned in connection with Comrades athletes.

In 2014, an analysis of negative splits by runner and statistician Mark Dowdeswell, suggested that a number of runners in the middle to back half of the field may be taking shortcuts.

== See also ==
- List of winners of the Comrades Marathon
- Records and Statistics of the Comrades Marathon
