= Bolshiye Kusty =

Bolshiye Kusty Большие Кусты
- Selo
- Location within Perm Krai Location within Russia
- Coordinates: 56°35′N 55°00′E
- Country: Russia
- Region: Perm Krai
- District: Kuyedinsky District
- Time zone: UTC+5:00

Bolshiye Kusty (Russian: Большие Кусты) is a rural locality (a selo) and the administrative center of Bolshekustovskoye Rural Settlement, Kuyedinsky District, Perm Krai, Russia. The population was 723 as of 2010. There are 7 streets.

== Geography ==
Bolshiye Kusty is located 49 km northwest of Kuyeda (the district's administrative centre) by road. Kashka is the nearest rural locality.
