= Kuyeda =

One of two places in Perm Krai, Russia

Kuyeda (Russian: Куеда) is the name of two rural localities in Kuyedinsky District of Perm Krai, Russia:

- Kuyeda (settlement), a settlement
- Kuyeda (village), a village
