= 2005 New York City Marathon =

Footrace held in New York City

36th New York City Marathon
- Venue: New York City, New York
- Date: November 6

Champions
- Men: Paul Tergat (2:09:29.9)
- Women: Jeļena Prokopčuka (2:24:41)
- Wheelchair men: Ernst van Dyk (1:31:11)
- Wheelchair women: Edith Hunkeler (1:54:52)

The 2005 New York City Marathon was the 36th running of the annual marathon race in New York City, New York, which took place on Sunday, November 6. The men's elite race was won by Kenya's Paul Tergat in a time of 2:09:29.9 hours, while the women's race was won by Latvia's Jeļena Prokopčuka in 2:24:41.

In the wheelchair races, South Africa's Ernst van Dyk (1:31:11) and Switzerland's Edith Hunkeler (1:54:17) won the men's and women's divisions, respectively. In the handcycle race, Australia's Todd Philpott (1:26:24) and Laura Stam (1:40:13) were the winners.

A total of 36,872 runners finished the race, 24,812 men and 12,060 women.

== Results ==
=== Men ===
| Position | Athlete | Nationality | Time |
|---|---|---|---|
| 1st place, gold medalist(s) | Paul Tergat | Kenya | 2:09:29.9 |
| 2nd place, silver medalist(s) | Hendrick Ramaala | South Africa | 2:09:30.3 |
| 3rd place, bronze medalist(s) | Meb Keflezighi | United States | 2:09:56 |
| 4 | Robert Kipkoech Cheruiyot | Kenya | 2:11:01 |
| 5 | Abdihakem Abdirahman | United States | 2:11:24 |
| 6 | Alberico Di Cecco | Italy | 2:11:33 |
| 7 | Viktor Röthlin | Switzerland | 2:11:44 |
| 8 | Simon Wangai | Kenya | 2:13:19 |
| 9 | Jon Brown | United Kingdom | 2:13:29 |
| 10 | Isaac Macharia | Kenya | 2:14:21 |
| 11 | Matt Downin | United States | 2:14:28 |
| 12 | James Theuri | Kenya | 2:14:59 |
| 13 | John Henwood | New Zealand | 2:15:05 |
| 14 | Robert Cheboror | Kenya | 2:15:24 |
| 15 | Christopher Cheboiboch | Kenya | 2:15:34 |
| 16 | Mark Saina | Kenya | 2:15:35 |
| 17 | Peter Gilmore | United States | 2:16:39 |
| 18 | Ryan Shay | United States | 2:17:14 |
| 19 | Kassahun Kabiso | Ethiopia | 2:18:58 |
| 20 | Antoni Peña | Spain | 2:20:40 |
| — | Patrick Tambwé | France | DNF |
| — | John Kagwe | Kenya | DNF |
| — | Mark Carroll | Ireland | DNF |
| — | Hailu Negussie | Ethiopia | DNF |
| — | Gert Thys | South Africa | DNF |
| — | John Mayock | United Kingdom | DNF |
| — | Solomon Busendich | Kenya | DNF |
| — | Christopher Graff | United States | DNF |
| — | Procopio Franco | Mexico | DNF |
| — | Giuliano Battocletti | Italy | DNF |
| — | Vincent Mulvey | Ireland | DNF |
| — | Joseph Kariuki | Kenya | DNF |
| — | Julius Kibet | Kenya | DNF |
| — | Jason Lehmkuhle | United States | DNF |
| — | Clint Verran | United States | DNF |

=== Women ===
| Position | Athlete | Nationality | Time |
|---|---|---|---|
| 1st place, gold medalist(s) | Jeļena Prokopčuka | Latvia | 2:24:41 |
| 2nd place, silver medalist(s) | Susan Chepkemei | Kenya | 2:24:55 |
| 3rd place, bronze medalist(s) | Derartu Tulu | Ethiopia | 2:25:21 |
| 4 | Salina Kosgei | Kenya | 2:25:30 |
| 5 | Bruna Genovese | Italy | 2:27:15 |
| 6 | Lyudmila Petrova | Russia | 2:27:21 |
| 7 | Gete Wami | Ethiopia | 2:27:40 |
| 8 | Lidiya Grigoryeva | Russia | 2:27:48 |
| 9 | Lyubov Denisova | Russia | 2:28:18 |
| 10 | Lornah Kiplagat | Netherlands | 2:28:28 |
| 11 | Tetyana Hladyr | Ukraine | 2:29:34 |
| 12 | Olesya Nurgalieva | Russia | 2:29:35 |
| 13 | Elena Nurgalieva | Russia | 2:32:36 |
| 14 | Dulce María Rodríguez | Mexico | 2:33:19 |
| 15 | Nuța Olaru | Romania | 2:33:49 |
| 16 | Marie Davenport | Ireland | 2:33:59 |
| 17 | Małgorzata Sobańska | Poland | 2:35:19 |
| 18 | Jennifer Rhines | United States | 2:37:07 |
| 19 | Elena Plastinina | Ukraine | 2:40:10 |
| 20 | Zoila Gomez | United States | 2:41:43 |
| — | Tina Connelly | Canada | DNF |
| — | Claudia-Mariela Nero | Argentina | DNF |
| — | Nataliya Berkut | Ukraine | DNF |
| — | Liz Yelling | United Kingdom | DNF |
| — | Hilda Kibet | Kenya | DNF |

- † Ran in mass race

=== Wheelchair men ===
| Position | Athlete | Nationality | Time |
|---|---|---|---|
| 1st place, gold medalist(s) | Ernst van Dyk | South Africa | 1:31:11 |
| 2nd place, silver medalist(s) | Aarón Gordian | Mexico | 1:31:28 |
| 3rd place, bronze medalist(s) | Kurt Fearnley | Australia | 1:31:45 |
| 4 | Krige Schabort | United States | 1:33:16 |
| 5 | Kelly Smith | Canada | 1:34:41 |
| 6 | David Weir | United Kingdom | 1:36:48 |
| 7 | Jeff Adams | Canada | 1:38:03 |
| 8 | Saúl Mendoza | United States | 1:39:26 |
| 9 | Tushar Patel | United Kingdom | 1:39:39 |
| 10 | Alfonso Zaregoza | Mexico | 1:39:42 |

=== Wheelchair women ===
| Position | Athlete | Nationality | Time |
|---|---|---|---|
| 1st place, gold medalist(s) | Edith Hunkeler | Switzerland | 1:54:52 |
| 2nd place, silver medalist(s) | Christina Ripp | United States | 1:55:39 |
| 3rd place, bronze medalist(s) | Shelly Woods | United Kingdom | 1:56:51 |
| 4 | Diane Roy | Canada | 1:59:30 |
| 5 | Shirley Reilly | United States | 2:02:17 |
| 6 | Sandra Graf | Switzerland | 2:03:04 |
| 7 | Miriam Nibley Ladner | United States | 2:06:01 |
| 8 | Cheri Blauwet | United States | 2:15:08 |
| 9 | Ariadne Hernández | Mexico | 2:16:24 |
| 10 | April Coughlin | United States | 2:29:28 |

=== Handcycle men ===
| Position | Athlete | Nationality | Time |
|---|---|---|---|
| 1st place, gold medalist(s) | Todd Philpott | Australia | 1:26:24 |
| 2nd place, silver medalist(s) | Roland Ruepp | Italy | 1:26:34 |
| 3rd place, bronze medalist(s) | John Vink | Netherlands | 1:29:13 |
| 4 | Theo Geeve | Netherlands | 1:29:16 |
| 5 | Bogdan Krol | Poland | 1:29:18 |

=== Handcycle women ===
| Position | Athlete | Nationality | Time |
|---|---|---|---|
| 1st place, gold medalist(s) | Laura Stam | Netherlands | 1:40:13 |
| 2nd place, silver medalist(s) | Helene Hines | United States | 1:45:51 |
| 3rd place, bronze medalist(s) | Monika Pudlis | Poland | 2:02:33 |
| 4 | Melissa Stockwell | United States | 2:10:15 |
| 5 | Emily Musto | United States | 2:28:20 |

== Changes to Qualifying Times for Guaranteed Entry ==
In 2001, general qualifying times were added to allow a portion of the fastest amateur runners to earn guaranteed entry into the race. The following year, additional categories were added to include more realistic qualifying times for runners 50-59 and 60+. Those qualifying times would remain the same for several years.

In 2005, those qualifying times were modified and made more lenient across the board. Five minutes were added to each of the men's marathon qualifying times and three minutes were added to each of the women's marathon qualifying times. The half marathon qualifying times were also increased by several minutes.

Below are the new qualifying times:

2005 Qualifying Times for Guaranteed Entry to the NYC Marathon.
| Age | Men's Marathon | Women's Marathon | Men's Half Marathon | Women's Half Marathon |
|---|---|---|---|---|
| Under 40 | 2:50:00 | 3:18:00 | 1:21:00 | 1:34:00 |
| 40 to 49 | 3:05:00 | 3:33:00 | 1:28:00 | 1:42:00 |
| 50 to 59 | 3:20:00 | 3:48:00 | 1:36:00 | 1:49:00 |
| 60+ | 3:35:00 | 4:03:00 | 1:43:00 | 1:56:00 |

Below are the existing qualifying times from 2001-2002:

2002 Qualifying Times for Guaranteed Entry to the NYC Marathon
| Age | Men's Marathon | Women's Marathon | Men's Half Marathon | Women's Half Marathon |
|---|---|---|---|---|
| Under 40 | 2:45:00 | 3:15:00 | 1:16:00 | 1:31:00 |
| 40 to 49 | 3:00:00 | 3:30:00 | 1:24:00 | 1:39:00 |
| 50 to 59 | 3:15:00 | 3:45:00 | 1:32:00 | 1:44:00 |
| 60+ | 3:30:00 | 4:00:00 | 1:40:00 | 1:55:00 |
