= Kalmiyary =

Kalmiyary Калмияры
- Village
- Location within Perm Krai Location within Russia
- Coordinates: 56°26′N 55°44′E
- Country: Russia
- Region: Perm Krai
- District: Kuyedinsky District
- Time zone: UTC+5:00

Kalmiyary (Russian: Калмияры) is a rural locality (a village) in Bikbardinskoye Rural Settlement, Kuyedinsky District, Perm Krai, Russia. The population was 112 as of 2010. There are 3 streets.

== Geography ==
Kalmiyary is located 18 km east of Kuyeda (the district's administrative centre) by road. Novonatalyino is the nearest rural locality.
