= Gozhan =

Gozhan Гожан
- Village
- Location within Perm Krai Location within Russia
- Coordinates: 56°31′N 55°12′E
- Country: Russia
- Region: Perm Krai
- District: Kuyedinsky District
- Time zone: UTC+5:00

Gozhan (Russian: Гожан) is a rural locality (a village) in Shagirtskoye Rural Settlement, Kuyedinsky District, Perm Krai, Russia. The population was 513 as of 2010. There are 9 streets.

== Geography ==
Gozhan is located 31 km northwest of Kuyeda (the district's administrative centre) by road. Novy Shagirt is the nearest rural locality.
