= Bolshoy Talmaz =

Bolshoy Talmaz Большой Талмаз
- Selo
- Location within Perm Krai Location within Russia
- Coordinates: 56°33′N 55°21′E
- Country: Russia
- Region: Perm Krai
- District: Kuyedinsky District
- Time zone: UTC+5:00

Bolshoy Talmaz (Russian: Большой Талмаз) is a rural locality (a selo) and the administrative center of Talmazskoye Rural Settlement, Kuyedinsky District, Perm Krai, Russia. The population was 231 as of 2010. There are 4 streets.

== Geography ==
Bolshoy Talmaz is located 23 km northwest of Kuyeda (the district's administrative centre) by road. Maly Talmaz is the nearest rural locality.
