= Kirga =

Kirga Кирга
- Village
- Location within Perm Krai Location within Russia
- Coordinates: 56°21′N 55°10′E
- Country: Russia
- Region: Perm Krai
- District: Kuyedinsky District
- Time zone: UTC+5:00

Kirga (Russian: Кирга) is a rural locality (a village) in Bolshegondryskoye Rural Settlement, Kuyedinsky District, Perm Krai, Russia. The population was 538 as of 2010. There are 8 streets.

== Geography ==
Kirga is located 31 km southwest of Kuyeda (the district's administrative centre) by road. Rabak is the nearest rural locality.
