= Tsentralnaya Usadba 3-go Goskonezavoda =

Tsentralnaya Usadba 3-go Goskonezavoda Центральная Усадьба 3-го Госконезавода
- Selo
- Location within Perm Krai Location within Russia
- Coordinates: 56°21′N 55°05′E
- Country: Russia
- Region: Perm Krai
- District: Kuyedinsky District
- Time zone: UTC+5:00

Tsentralnaya Usadba 3-go Goskonezavoda (Russian: Центральная Усадьба 3-го Госконезавода) is a rural locality (a selo) and the administrative center of Nizhnesavinskoye Rural Settlement, Kuyedinsky District, Perm Krai, Russia. The population was 800 as of 2010. There are 16 streets.

== Geography ==
It is located 38 km southwest of Kuyeda (the district's administrative centre) by road. Nizhnyaya Sova is the nearest rural locality.
