= Kitryum =

Kitryum Китрюм
- Village
- Location within Perm Krai Location within Russia
- Coordinates: 56°29′N 54°59′E
- Country: Russia
- Region: Perm Krai
- District: Kuyedinsky District
- Time zone: UTC+5:00

Kitryum (Russian: Китрюм) is a rural locality (a village) in Shagirtskoye Rural Settlement, Kuyedinsky District, Perm Krai, Russia. The population was 156 as of 2010. There are 3 streets.

== Geography ==
Kitryum is located 46 km west of Kuyeda (the district's administrative centre) by road. Stepanovka is the nearest rural locality.
