= Udmurt-Shagirt =

Udmurt-Shagirt Удмурт-Шагирт
- Village
- Location within Perm Krai Location within Russia
- Coordinates: 56°28′N 55°12′E
- Country: Russia
- Region: Perm Krai
- District: Kuyedinsky District
- Time zone: UTC+5:00

Udmurt-Shagirt (Russian: Удмурт-Шагирт) is a rural locality (a village) in Shagirtskoye Rural Settlement, Kuyedinsky District, Perm Krai, Russia. The population was 212 as of 2010. There are 5 streets.

== Geography ==
Udmurt-Shagirt is located 28 km northwest of Kuyeda (the district's administrative centre) by road. Stary Shagirt is the nearest rural locality.
