= Bolshoy Gondyr =

Bolshoy Gondyr Большой Гондыр
- Selo
- Location within Perm Krai Location within Russia
- Coordinates: 56°22′30″N 55°19′41″E
- Country: Russia
- Region: Perm Krai
- District: Kuyedinsky District
- Time zone: UTC+5:00

Bolshoy Gondyr (Russian: Большой Гондыр) is a rural locality (a selo) and the administrative center of Bolshegondryskoye Rural Settlement, Kuyedinsky District, Perm Krai, Russia. The population was 1,141 as of 2010. There are 20 streets.

== Geography ==
Bolshoy Gondyr is located 18 km southwest of Kuyeda (the district's administrative centre) by road. Verkh-Gondyr is the nearest rural locality.
