= Verkh-Gondyr =

Verkh-Gondyr Верх-Гондыр
- Village
- Location within Perm Krai Location within Russia
- Coordinates: 56°20′N 55°20′E
- Country: Russia
- Region: Perm Krai
- District: Kuyedinsky District
- Time zone: UTC+5:00

Verkh-Gondyr (Russian: Верх-Гондыр) is a rural locality (a village) in Bolshegondryskoye Rural Settlement, Kuyedinsky District, Perm Krai, Russia. The population was 234 as of 2010. There are 3 streets.

== Geography ==
Verkh-Gondyr is located 23 km southwest of Kuyeda (the district's administrative centre) by road. Bolshoy Gondyr is the nearest rural locality.
