= Alnyash =

Alnyash Альняш
- Village
- Location within Perm Krai Location within Russia
- Coordinates: 56°25′N 55°16′E
- Country: Russia
- Region: Perm Krai
- District: Kuyedinsky District
- Time zone: UTC+5:00

Alnyash (Russian: Альняш) is a rural locality (a village) in Shagirtskoye Rural Settlement, Kuyedinsky District, Perm Krai, Russia. The population was 112 as of 2010. There is 1 street.

== Geography ==
Alnyash is located 33 km west of Kuyeda (the district's administrative centre) by road. Vilgurt is the nearest rural locality.
