= Novy Shagirt =

Novy Shagirt Новый Шагирт
- Village
- Location within Perm Krai Location within Russia
- Coordinates: 56°31′N 55°15′E
- Country: Russia
- Region: Perm Krai
- District: Kuyedinsky District
- Time zone: UTC+5:00

Novy Shagirt (Russian: Новый Шагирт) is a rural locality (a village) in Shagirtskoye Rural Settlement, Kuyedinsky District, Perm Krai, Russia. The population was 47 as of 2010. There is 1 street.

== Geography ==
Novy Shagirt is located 32 km northwest of Kuyeda (the district's administrative centre) by road. Gozhan is the nearest rural locality.
