= Oshya =

Oshya Ошья
- Selo
- Location within Perm Krai Location within Russia
- Coordinates: 56°30′N 54°52′E
- Country: Russia
- Region: Perm Krai
- District: Kuyedinsky District
- Time zone: UTC+5:00

Oshya (Russian: Ошья) is a rural locality (a selo) and the administrative center of Oshyinskoye Rural Settlement, Kuyedinsky District, Perm Krai, Russia. The population was 820 as of 2010. There are 14 streets.

== Geography ==
Oshya is located 52 km northwest of Kuyeda (the district's administrative centre) by road. Verkhnyaya Oshya and Uzyar are the nearest rural localities.
