= Stary Shagirt =

Stary Shagirt Старый Шагирт
- Selo
- Location within Perm Krai Location within Russia
- Coordinates: 56°27′N 55°12′E
- Country: Russia
- Region: Perm Krai
- District: Kuyedinsky District
- Time zone: UTC+5:00

Stary Shagirt (Russian: Старый Шагирт) is a rural locality (a selo) and the administrative center of Shagirtskoye Rural Settlement, Kuyedinsky District, Perm Krai, Russia. The population was 820 as of 2010. There are 14 streets.

== Geography ==
Stary Shagirt is located 30 km west of Kuyeda (the district's administrative centre) by road. Udmurt-Shagirt is the nearest rural locality.

== History ==
The settlement has been known since 1816 as the village of Shagirt. It became a village in 1841, when the Ascension Edinoverie wooden church was built here. In 1933, the Ural state stud farm No. 6 was created in the village, which on May 26, 1960 was transformed into the Uralsky state farm.

Ascension Edinoverie Church burned down in 1880. Instead, in 1883, a new one was built at the expense of parishioners and donations. Closed December 23, 1929.
