= Bolshaya Usa =

Bolshaya Usa Большая Уса
- Selo
- Location within Perm Krai Location within Russia
- Coordinates: 56°44′N 55°05′E
- Country: Russia
- Region: Perm Krai
- District: Kuyedinsky District
- Time zone: UTC+5:00

Bolshaya Usa (Russian: Большая Уса) is a rural locality (a selo) and the administrative center of Bolsheusinskoye Rural Settlement, Kuyedinsky District, Perm Krai, Russia. The population was 1,601 as of 2010. There are 28 streets.

== Geography ==
Bolshaya Usa is located 50 km northwest of Kuyeda (the district's administrative centre) by road. Okulov is the nearest rural locality.
