= Verkhyaya Sava =

Verkhyaya Sava Верхняя Сава
- Selo
- Location within Perm Krai Location within Russia
- Coordinates: 56°27′N 55°06′E
- Country: Russia
- Region: Perm Krai
- District: Kuyedinsky District
- Time zone: UTC+5:00

Verkhyaya Sava (Russian: Верхняя Сава) is a rural locality (a selo) in Shagirtskoye Rural Settlement, Kuyedinsky District, Perm Krai, Russia. The population was 488 as of 2010. There are 8 streets.

== Geography ==
Verkhyaya Sava is located 40 km west of Kuyeda (the district's administrative centre) by road. Stepanovka is the nearest rural locality.
