= Arthur Newton =

Arthur Newton may refer to:

- Arthur Newton (cricketer) (1862–1952), Somerset and Oxford University cricketer
- Arthur F. H. Newton (1883–1959), British athlete
- Arthur L. Newton (1883–1956), American athlete
- Arthur Newton, a character in the film 12.10

== See also ==
- A. P. Newton (Arthur Percival; 1873–1942), British historian
- A. Edward Newton (Arthur; 1864–1940), American writer, publisher and book collector
- A. Richard Newton (Arthur; 1951–2007), Australian-born American computer scientist
