= Mohala Mohloli =

Lesotho long-distance runner

Personal information
- Nationality: Lesotho
- Born: 12 November 1961 (age 64)

Sport
- Sport: Long-distance running
- Event: Marathon

Mahlala "Rasta" Mohloli (born 12 November 1961) is a Lesotho long-distance runner. He competed in the men's marathon at the 1988 Summer Olympics.

== Career ==
Mohloli qualified for the marathon at the 1988 Olympics. At the Games, he ran 2:44:44 hours to place 82nd overall.

After the Olympics, he focused on road running and ultramarathon races. He held the course record for the Om Die Dam Marathon for several years.

He placed 6th at the 1999 Comrades Marathon. After that race he tested positive for nandrolone, a steroid, and received a two-year ban. Mohloli claimed he did not intentionally take the drug, saying he was framed by an unknown doctor that injected him during a flu shot. His medal and 9,000 Rand prize money were returned.

He resumed racing as a masters athlete at the 2001 City to City 50K run event in South Africa. Despite being 45 years old, he was considered a top contender for the 2005 Comrades Marathon. He had recorded nine top-ten finishes at the race before the 2005 edition.

== Personal life ==
Mohloli lived in Maseru, Lesotho. He was described as "likeable, cool, and laid back" and was a popular figure. He trained with the Harmony Gold Running Club.

In 2011, Mohloli was one of ten athletes disowned by the Lesotho Athletics Amateur Association over a permit dispute. He sought to disband the LAAA executive committee so that it could be run by former athletes.
