= Zeb Luhabe =

South African ultramarathon athlete

Personal information
- Nationality: South African
- Born: Zeb Luhabe; 1926 or 1927
- Died: 17 January 2019 (aged 92)
- Occupation: Long-distance runner

Sport
- Country: South Africa
- Sport: Athletics
- Event(s): Marathon, Ultramarathon
- Club: Real Gijimas

Zeb Luhabe (1926 or 1927 – 17 January 2019) was a South African ultramarathon runner known for popularizing running in the Eastern Cape and participating in races into his nineties. Luhabe is most known for being both the oldest and last finisher in the 2003 Comrades Marathon at age 76, a feat he achieved after 10 failed finishes, having first attempted the race in 1989. This finish awarded Luhabe the Spirit of Comrades trophy, inscribed with "Harmony Spirit of Comrades Award presented with the admiration of the organisers for his courage and determination as the last runner to finish”.

In 1992, Luhabe nearly crossed the Comrades Marathon finish line in time; however, he cramped and did not complete the course within the 12 hour limit. Luhabe was also the oldest runner in the 2004 Comrades Marathon.

At the time of his 2003 finish, Luhabe was retired and had previously worked as a policeman in East London. Luhabe began running at the age of 56. As of 90, Luhabe was still actively running.
