= Polly Shortts =

Old Main Road between Mkondeni and Ashburton, South Africa

Coordinates: 29°39′34″S 30°26′11″E

Polly Shortts is a hill on the outskirts of Pietermaritzburg, KwaZulu Natal, South Africa. Polly Shortts is reportedly named after Portland Bentinck Shortts. Shortts managed Shortts Retreat, a nearby farm, and whose help was often sought when after heavy rain, the road up the hill became muddy and impassable.

Polly Shortts is known for being located on the route of the famous 90 km ultramarathon, the Comrades Marathon. Pollys, as it is known among participants, is about 2 kilometers long, is particularly steep and comes about 7 – 8 km from the end of the race in odd-numbered years (when it goes from Durban to Pietermaritzburg). Few runners outside the top ten manage the ascent without stopping to walk. In even-numbered years (Pietermaritzburg to Durban), Pollys is near the start of the race, and the runners must descend it.
