= Dave Wright (runner) =

Dave Wright (born 9 October 1951) is a former South African ultramarathon athlete. He won 5 gold medals in the Comrades Marathon, the world's largest and oldest ultramarathon, and 3 gold medals in the Two Oceans Marathon. Despite not winning either event, he gained renown and is still famous in running circles as Dancing Dave Wright due to his tradition of finishing all Comrades with "something between a tango and a waltz" followed by a cartwheel across the finishing line.

== Background ==
Dave Wright was born and raised in Johannesburg, South Africa, where he attended St John's College, from where he matriculated in 1968. After high-school he spent one year at Stellenbosch University but returned to Johannesburg after only a year, entering Wits University. It was during his time at Wits that Dave first began to run competitively, including his first two Comrades in 1973 and 1974.

After completing his undergraduate, he moved to Durban and joined Savages Athletic Club, with whom he would achieve his greatest success. After four years in Durban, he returned again to Johannesburg, running for a while with Old Edwardians and later Rand Athletic Club.

== Comrades Marathon ==
The Comrades Marathon is the event in which Dave Wright established his reputation as a serious ultramarathon runner and etched his name into the lore of South African running as Dancing Dave Wright with his finishing line routine. He won five gold medals between 1977 and 1982, with a personal best placing of second, and completed ten races. For both these achievements he has earned his Comrades Marathon number of 2390 in perpetuity, a green number

However, what sets him apart from all other Comrades runners was his habit of finishing at the front of the field of the 90 km (56 mile) race with a "waltz" and a cartwheel over the line, something that all-time race-win record holder, Bruce Fordyce, recently placed as number 4 on his list of 10 Best Comrades Moments, writing that while he could "scarcely hobble at the finish...his (Dave's) gymnastic display was always worth at least a 9.75 for the Olympic floor exercise."

=== The Dance ===
His routine would begin approximately 50 meters out from the finishing line, when he would hold his arms out to his sides at shoulder height while alternately swinging one leg behind the other and continuing to run. Just before the finish he would launch into a cartwheel that took him across the line. In 1978 he cartwheeled over the line in 2nd position directly into the formally dressed lady mayor of Durban.

=== Results ===
Year	Position	Time	Direction	Athletics Club
1973	28	6:22:00	Down	Wits
1974	31	6:46:00	Up	Wits
1975	771	9:17:00	Up	Savages
1977	3	5:58:00	Up	Savages
1978	2	5:48:00	Down	Savages
1979	10	6:04:58	Up	Savages
1981	8	5:56:02	Up	Old Edwardians
1982	5	5:46:49	Down	Old Edwardians
1986	97	6:25:53	Down	Rand
1988	DNF	-	Up	Rand
1994	36	6:14:54	Up	Rand
1995	DNF	-	Down	Rand

== Two Oceans Marathon ==
In addition to the Comrades, Dave also performed well in South Africa's other major ultramarathon, the 56 km Two Oceans Marathon. He completed the event 6 times between 1973 and 1983, placing in the top-10 on five occasions.

Year	Position	Time	Athletics Club
1973	3	3:30:54	Wits
1978	7	3:26:00	Savages
1979	4	3:21:00	Savages
1981	8	3:22:22	Old Edwardians
1982	10	3:22:10	Old Edwardians
1983	124	3:52:19	Old Edwardians
