= Vic Clapham =

Founder of the Comrades Marathon

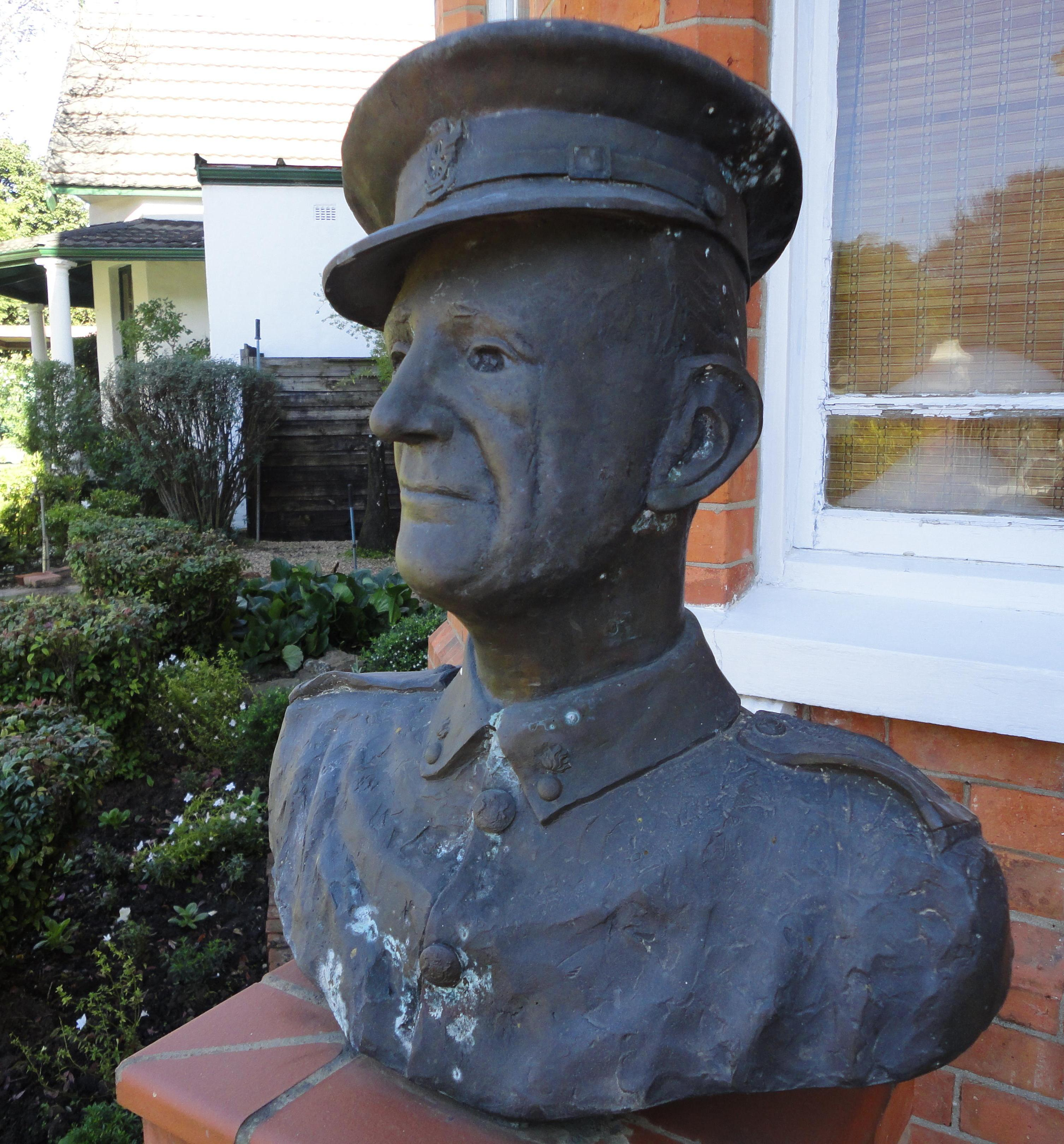
- Education: Wynberg Boys' High School.
- Occupation: Comrades Marathon

Vic Clapham (16 November 1886 – 1962) was the founder of the Comrades Marathon, the world's largest ultra-marathon, of approximately 90 km held annually between Durban and Pietermaritzburg in South Africa.

As a World War I veteran, Clapham conceived the race to commemorate the South African soldiers killed during the war. It was run for the first time on 24 May 1921 and has been run more than 80 times since then, now with an average field of 20,000 runners.

== Early life ==
Vic Clapham was born in London on 16 November 1886 and arrived in the Cape Colony in South Africa with his parents at the outbreak of the Anglo-Boer War in 1899. Clapham attended Wynberg Boys' High School.

== First World War ==
At the start of the First World War, he signed up with the 8th South African Infantry which was sent to German East Africa, now Tanzania. During this time he marched over 2700 kilometres in pursuit of General Paul von Lettow-Vorbeck's askari battalions.

== Comrades Marathon ==
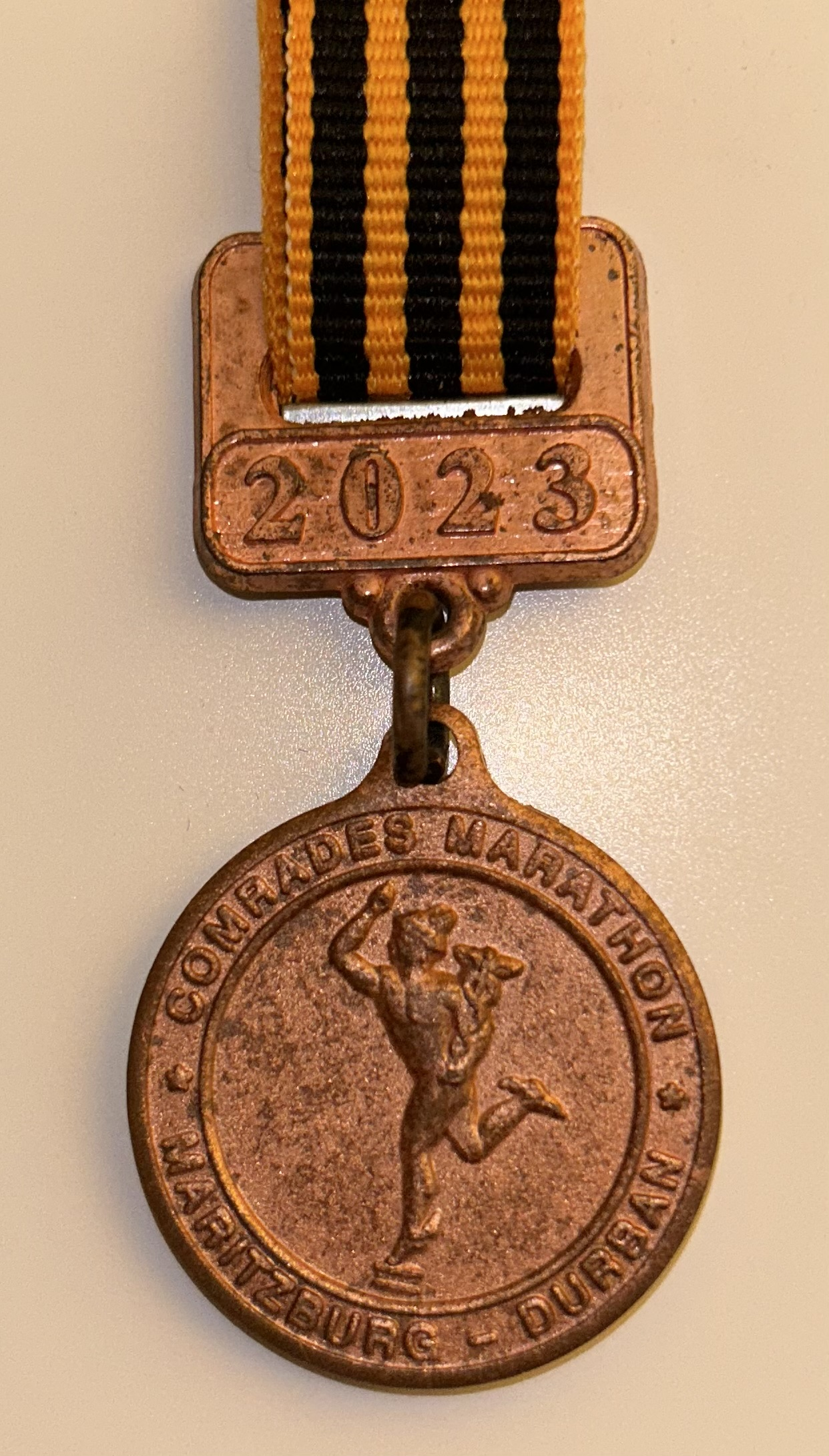
Vic Clapham medal from the 2023 Comrades Marathon

After the war ended, Clapham wanted to establish a memorial to the suffering and deaths of his comrades during the war, and their camaraderie in overcoming these hardships. He conceived of an extremely demanding race where the physical endurance of entrants could be put to the test.

Clapham asked for permission to stage a 56-mile race between Pietermaritzburg and Durban under the name of the Comrades Marathon, and for it to become a living memorial to the spirit of the soldiers of the Great War. Permission was at first refused but was eventually granted. The first Comrades Marathon took place on 24 May 1921, Empire Day, starting outside the City Hall in Pietermaritzburg with 34 runners.

The race has been run every year since then, except for the years 1941–1945 during the Second World War and during COVID restrictions. The constitution of the race today states that one of its primary aims is to "celebrate mankind's spirit over adversity". Copper medals – known as the Vic Clapham medal – go to those athletes who finish the race between 11 and 12 hours.

He died in 1962.
