= Wally Hayward =

South African long-distance runner

Medal record

Men's Athletics

Representing South Africa

British Empire Games
Bronze medal – third place	1938 Sydney	6 miles

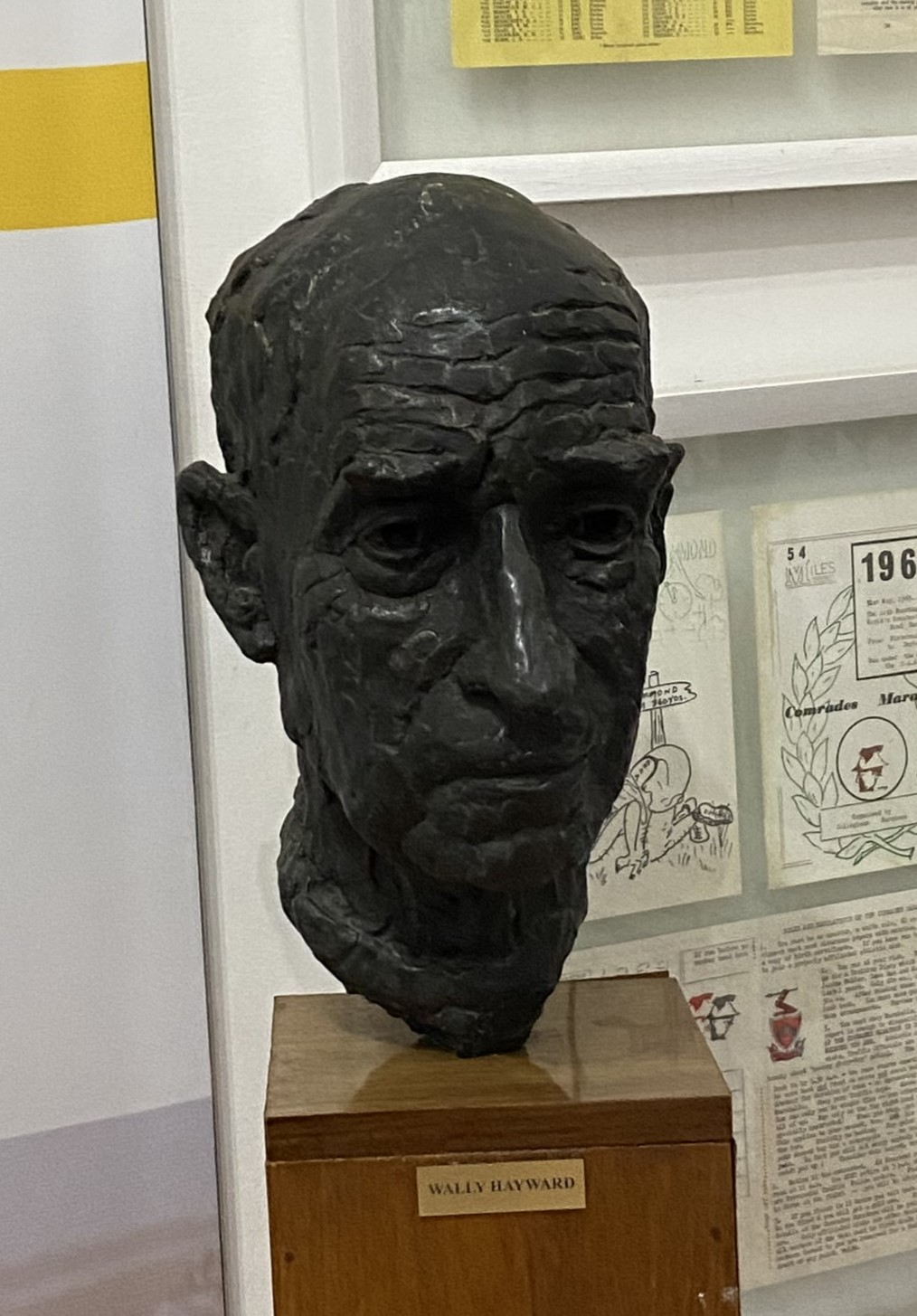
A bust of Wally Hayward displayed in the Comrades House

Wallace Henry Hayward BEM (10 July 1908 – 28 April 2006) was a South African endurance athlete with a 60-year career. He became one of the greatest 100-mile runners in history. He won the Comrades Marathon five times and completed the distance of around 90 km the last time just before his eighty-first birthday.

He was born in Durban and died in Edenvale, South Africa. He died in 2006 just a few days before the annual Wally Hayward Marathon.

== Early life ==
As a teen, Hayward became an apprentice carpenter. A friend talked Hayward into taking a running job, to put in stakes for diamond mining claims. In 1927 at the age of 19, he joined a Boy’s Club and was invited to go running. In 1929, he read about the Comrades Marathon and wrote to the race director Vic Clapham. He was surprised to learn that the race was about 54–56 miles. He decided to enter the 1930 race.

== Comrades Marathon ==
He won the race for the first time on his first attempt in 1930 at age 21. In 1931 Hayward broke a bone in his foot while training for Comrades and was told by a doctor that some chest pain he was feeling was due to a strained heart. At age 23, he was told to never run again. He put running aside for a few years until a specialist told him the diagnosis was “rubbish” and told him to go home and put on his running shoes. By 1938 he was competing again.

Twenty years later he competed again and won it from 1950 to 1954, except for 1952 when he chose to rather represent South Africa at the 1952 Summer Olympics in Helsinki. He finished tenth in the Olympic marathon event.

In 1951 and 1953 (first athlete under 6 hours) he broke the down-run record, and in 1954 he broke the up-run record and became the oldest man to win the race at age 45 (later overtaken by Vladimir Kotov in 2004).

In 1988 he returned once again to participate. He beat half the finishers with a time of 9h44m. In 1989, Wally finished 1min 57sec before the cut-off time at the age of 80. He held the record for the oldest finisher of the Comrades Marathon for 34 years, until it was broken in 2023 by Maros Johannes Mosehla.

== Other achievements ==
In 1953 he established records in the London to Brighton Marathon in 5:29:40, the Bath to London 100-miler in 12:20:28, and the 24-hour track race with 159 miles, 562 yards.

At the 1938 Empire Games in Sydney he won the bronze medal in the 6 miles competition and finished fourth in the three mile race.

Hayward fought in North Africa and Italy during World War II and in 1942 earned the British Empire Medal for bravery for his actions near El Alamein in Egypt.

== Personal life ==
Hayward married Gladys Catto in December 1934 and had one daughter, Gwenolyn in October 1935. They divorced in 1957. In 1971, Hayward married his second wife, Bertha Bland.

== Controversy ==
In 1953 he accepted a small donation towards his traveling while competing in Britain. The South African Athletics and Cycling Association declared him a professional, banning him from all amateur events. The ban was finally lifted in 1974.
