= Om Die Dam Marathon =

Om Die Dam Marathon (English: "Around the dam") is a yearly ultramarathon that is held in the South African town of Hartbeespoort (in the North West Province). The event has been held since 1991, is the largest inland Ultramarathon in South Africa, and one of the largest ultramarathons in the world.

The course records are held by O. Phalahane (2:49:39, 2010) and Gerda Steyn (3:16:16, 2024).
