= Drummond, KwaZulu-Natal =

Drummond
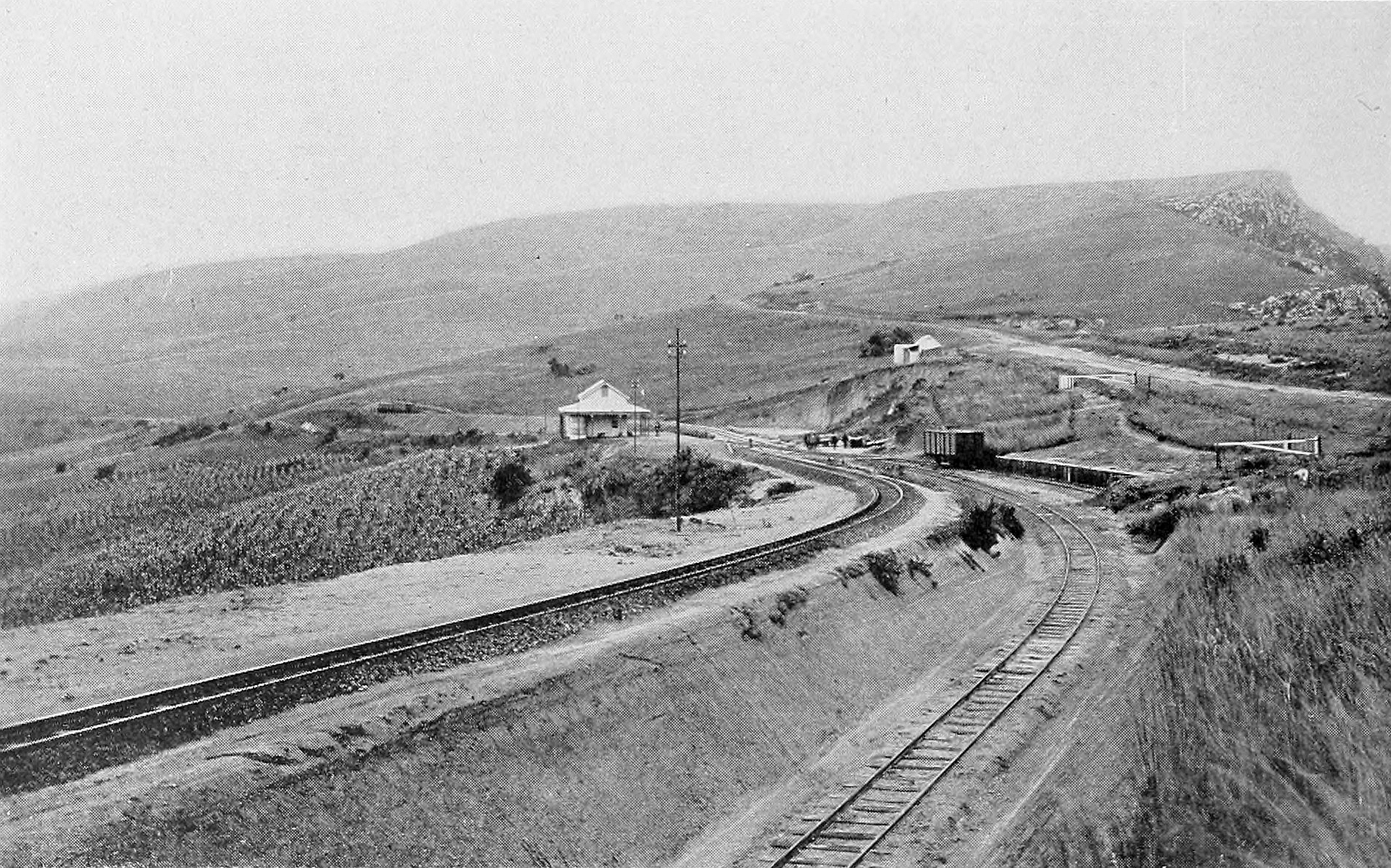
- Drummond Station, 1891

- Location within KwaZulu-Natal Location within South Africa
- Coordinates: 29.760°S 30.690°E
- Country: South Africa
- Province: KwaZulu-Natal
- Municipality: eThekwini

Area
  - Total: 7.72 km^{2} (2.98 sq mi)

Population (2011)
  - Total: 955
  - Density: 124/km^{2} (320/sq mi)

Racial makeup (2011)
  - Black African: 17.0%
  - Coloured: 0.8%
  - Indian/Asian: 1.8%
  - White: 79.0%
  - Other: 1.4%

First languages (2011)
  - English: 72.7%
  - Afrikaans: 11.3%
  - Zulu: 8.0%
  - Xhosa: 2.6%
  - Other: 5.4%
- Time zone: UTC+2 (SAST)
- PO box: 3626

Drummond is a town in eThekwini Metro in the KwaZulu-Natal province of South Africa.

The village is 45 km west of Durban. It was named after F C Drummond, former director of the Natal Land and Colonisation Company.

It is famous for being the halfway mark of the Comrades Marathon.

Visit the local community website for more information on this area and the local events and entertainment available (www.seeupperhighway.com)
