= Bruce Fordyce =

South African runner

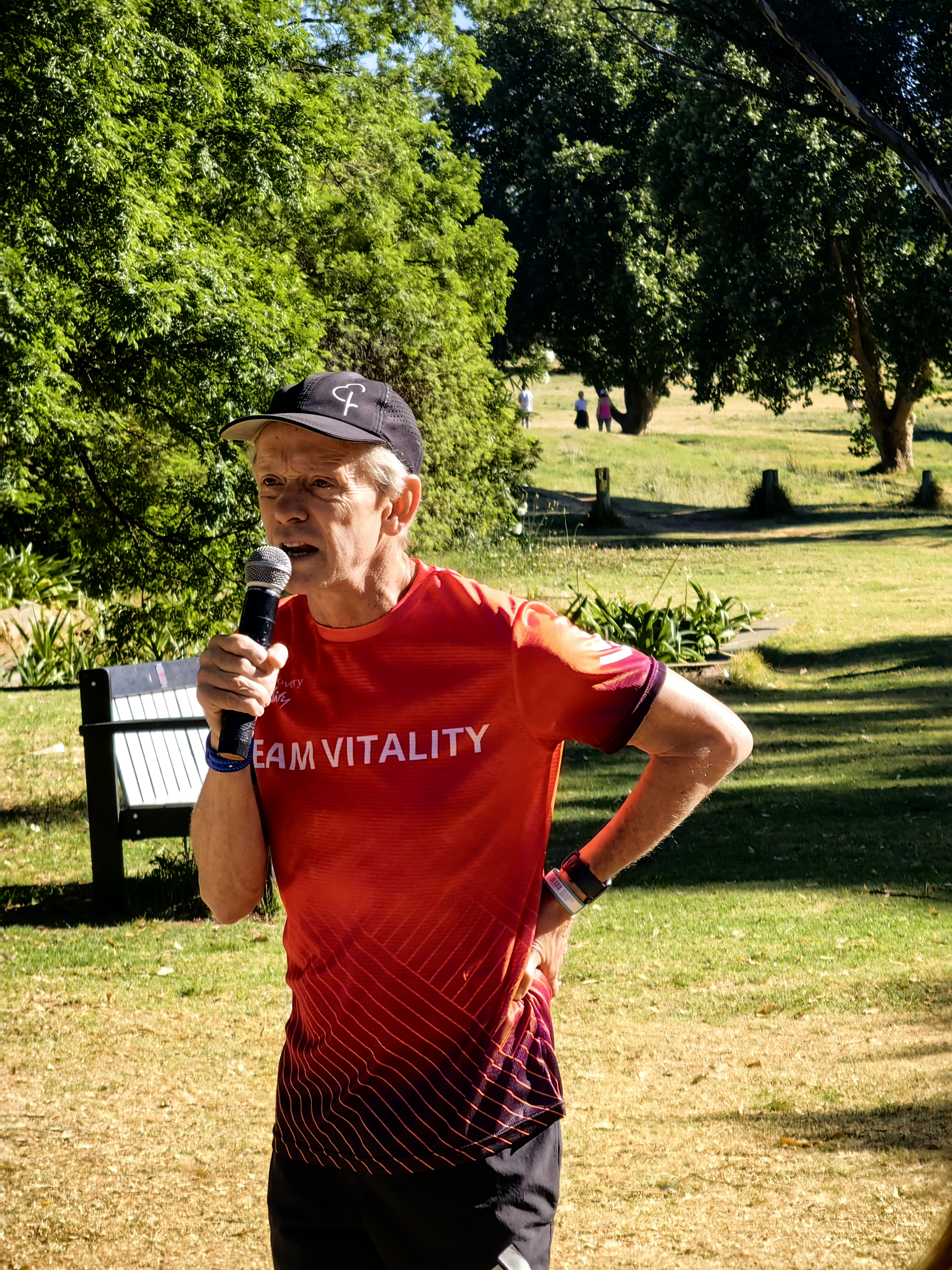
- Bruce Fordyce at his 500th parkrun

Personal information
- Nationality: South African
- Born: 3 December 1955 (age 70) Hong Kong
- Education: University of the Witwatersrand

Sport
- Sport: marathon; ultramarathon
Medal record
Bronze medal – third place	Comrades Marathon	1979
Silver medal – second place	Comrades Marathon	1980
Gold medal – first place	Comrades Marathon	1981
Gold medal – first place	Comrades Marathon	1982
Gold medal – first place	Comrades Marathon	1983
Gold medal – first place	Comrades Marathon	1984
Gold medal – first place	Comrades Marathon	1985
Gold medal – first place	Comrades Marathon	1986
Gold medal – first place	Comrades Marathon	1987
Gold medal – first place	Comrades Marathon	1988
Gold medal – first place	Comrades Marathon	1990

Bruce Noel Stevenson Fordyce (born 3 December 1955 in Hong Kong) is a South African marathon and ultramarathon athlete who was also active in opposing apartheid. He is best known for having won the South African Comrades Marathon a record nine times, of which eight wins were consecutive. He also won the London to Brighton Ultramarathon three years in a row. He is the former world record holder over 50 miles and the former world record holder over 100 km.

== Early life and education ==
Born in Hong Kong to Evan Noel and Nancy Ann (Née Stevenson), Fordyce moved with his family to Johannesburg when he was 13 years old. He completed his school career at Woodmead High School and subsequently attended the University of the Witwatersrand, where he obtained his Bachelor of Arts degree in 1977 and his Honours Bachelor of Arts degree in 1979. During this time he was also a member of the university's anti-apartheid Student Representative Council as well as a committee member of the Wits Athletic Club. He married Gillian Leigh (Née Bruce)

Fordyce has an interest in Southern African prehistory and San rock art, based on his academic background in archaeology. His participation in international marathons has brought him to several archaeologically significant regions, most notably Jerusalem, where he competed in the Jerusalem Marathon and visited local archaeological sites. He has also been described as an enthusiastic birdwatcher, with a particular interest in African birdlife.

== Comrades Marathon ==
In 1977, when Fordyce first ran the Comrades Marathon, he placed 43rd out of 1,678 entries. He placed 14th in 1978, 3rd in 1979, 2nd in 1980, and was the winner for an unprecedented eight consecutive years from 1981 to 1988; he won it again in 1990. No other runner in the history of the Comrades has achieved this feat. Fordyce also held the record time for the "up" run (Durban to Pietermaritzburg) and his record of 5:24:07 for the "down" run (Pietermaritzburg to Durban) stood for 21 years from 1986 until it was broken in 2007 by Russia's Leonid Shvetsov.

Bruce Fordyce's Comrades Marathon Results
Year	Position	Time	Direction	Medal
1977	43	06:45:00	Up	Silver
1978	14	06:11:00	Down	Silver
1979	3	05:51:15	Up	Gold
1980	2	05:40:31	Down	Gold
1981	1	05:37:28	Up	Gold
1982	1	05:34:22	Down	Gold
1983	1	05:30:12	Up	Gold
1984	1	05:27:18	Down	Gold
1985	1	05:37:01	Up	Gold
1986	1	05:24:07	Down	Gold
1987	1	05:37:01	Up	Gold
1988	1	05:27:42	Up	Gold
1990	1	05:40:25	Up	Gold
1991	328	06:57:02	Down	Silver
1994	19	06:01:54	Up	Silver
1995	2232	08:42:48	Down	Bronze
1996	329	06:59:30	Up	Silver
2000	2691	08:41:11	Up	Bill Rowan
2001	2790	08:50:52	Down	Bill Rowan
2002	4252	09:48:46	Up	Bronze
2003	2784	08:53:12	Down	Bill Rowan
2004	3088	09:26:02	Up	Bronze
2005	2311	08:45:20	Down	Bill Rowan
2006	3596	09:41:11	Up	Bronze
2007	3861	09:48:18	Down	Bronze
2008	3710	10:07:33	Up	Bronze
2009	3818	09:48:21	Down	Bronze
2010	965	07:55:03	Down	Bill Rowan
2011	488	07:30:31	Up	Bill Rowan
2012	1099	08:06:10	Down	Bill Rowan

He has thus completed 30 Comrades Marathons, including the remarkable result of posting identical times in 1985 and 1987. In 2011 he aimed for a silver medal, but missed this by 32 seconds (finishing time of 7 hours 30 minutes 31 seconds).

== London to Brighton Ultramarathon ==
Fordyce won the London to Brighton ultramarathon three years running from 1981 to 1983.

== World record holder ==
Fordyce was the world record holder over 50 miles, when he covered the distance in 4hr 50min 21sec at the 1984 AMJA 50 Mile Ultramarathon in Chicago, IL, until the record was broken by Jim Walmsley on 5 May 2019. Fordyce holds the 50-mile record for the United States All Comers Race.

== Political activism ==
Fordyce was strongly anti-apartheid. On his first victory race in 1981 he wore a black armband to protest against the 20th anniversary celebrations of the apartheid republic attracting boos and even some rotten tomatoes thrown by a fellow runner. Fordyce has claimed this protest as "one of the proudest moments in my life".

== Books, journalism and motivational speaker ==
In addition to having written two books about the Comrades Marathon, Fordyce was also a sports columnist for various newspapers and magazines, and a SABC television commentator for the 2014 event. He is also a motivational speaker and the chief executive officer of the South African Sports Trust.

== Parkrun ==
Fordyce also introduced parkrun to South Africa in November 2011. This is a collection of free-entry weekly 5k run events. There are now 210 parkrun events in South Africa as of 16 October 2023. Fordyce ran his 500th parkrun at Delta Park, Johannesburg, the first South African parkrun venue, on 14 October 2023.

== Other honours ==
In 2004, he was voted 64th in the Top 100 Great South Africans.

In 2007, he was awarded an honorary doctorate from the University of the Witwatersrand.
