= Arthur F. H. Newton =

Marathon runner (1883–1959)

Arthur Francis Hamilton Newton
Personal information
- Born: May 20, 1883 Weston-super-Mare, England
- Died: September 7, 1959 (aged 76) Hillingdon, England

Sport
- Sport: Long-distance running
- Event(s): Comrades Marathon, 50 miles, 100 miles, 24-hour race
- Club: Bulawayo Harriers

Arthur Francis Hamilton Newton (20 May 1883 – 7 September 1959) was an English-born long-distance runner. He won the Comrades Marathon in South Africa five times. He held world records for 50-miles, 100-miles and 24-hours with 152 miles.

== Background ==
Educated at Bedford School, in 1901 Newton traveled to South Africa to join his brother and worked as a teacher. After returning to England in 1909, he decided to settle in South Africa permanently and in 1911 acquired a farm in Natal. During World War I Newton served in the Natal Light Horse as a dispatch rider. On returning to his farm he found it in a state of neglect and after some disagreements with the government decided to generate publicity for his case by running the 1922 Comrades Marathon, which had been first held the previous year.

Although he had run sporadically when he was younger, Newton restarted his running career on 1 January 1922 at the age of 38. Just 20 weeks later, he competed in his first Comrades Marathon as a publicity stunt. Newton believed that a good performance would make him popular with the public, and it gave him the opportunity to publicize what he perceived as "gross injustices" being perpetrated by the South African government in connection with his land dispute. His victory and subsequent success surprised him and set him on a new career path as a professional athlete and then as a writer.

Newton also dismissed the then-current ideas on long distance training and was an early pioneer of the concept of high mileage training at relatively slow speeds (later called long slow distance). Tim Noakes, professor of sport science at the University of Cape Town, suggests that it was Arthur Newton who initially proposed that running longer distances at slower paces was the most effective training method.

== Comrades Marathon ==
The 1922 race was the first "up" version of the Comrades Marathon. Just before Camperdown, Newton took the lead and won the race in a time of 8:40:00.

The next year, 1923, he had trained properly and won by 52 minutes in a time of 6:56:07, beating the previous record by over two hours. Only by chance were two race officials at the finish. They recorded the time of the nearby post office clock.

In 1924, an up year, he won by 75 minutes in a time of 6:58:22. After this race he returned to England and ran the London to Brighton course in 5:53:43, beating the previous record by over an hour. When the London to Brighton race started as an annual event in 1951 the trophy for the winner was called the Arthur Newton Cup.

In 1925 he lowered the Comrades record again with a time of 6:24:54. His final victory in 1927 was with a time of 6:40:56.

== Rhodesia ==
Although Newton had gained publicity for his running exploits, he did not receive the compensation he thought he deserved and in 1925 decided to move to Rhodesia. Lack of money meant he began the 770 mile trip on foot. However, some newspapers gave him publicity and money was raised for him. In Rhodesia he founded the Bulawayo Harriers and set amateur records for 60 and 100 miles.

== Later races ==
In early 1928 Newton broke the 100-mile record on the Bath to London road in a time of 14:22:10. Later that year he began competing as a professional and ran in races in the United States, Canada and Britain. In his last race, in 1934, he broke the Bath to London 100 mile record again with a time of 14:06:00 at the age of 51.

In retirement he wrote an autobiography and several books on his training methods.

== Archives ==
Archives of Arthur Newton are held at the Cadbury Research Library, University of Birmingham.
