= Olesya Nurgalieva =

Russian ultramarathon runner

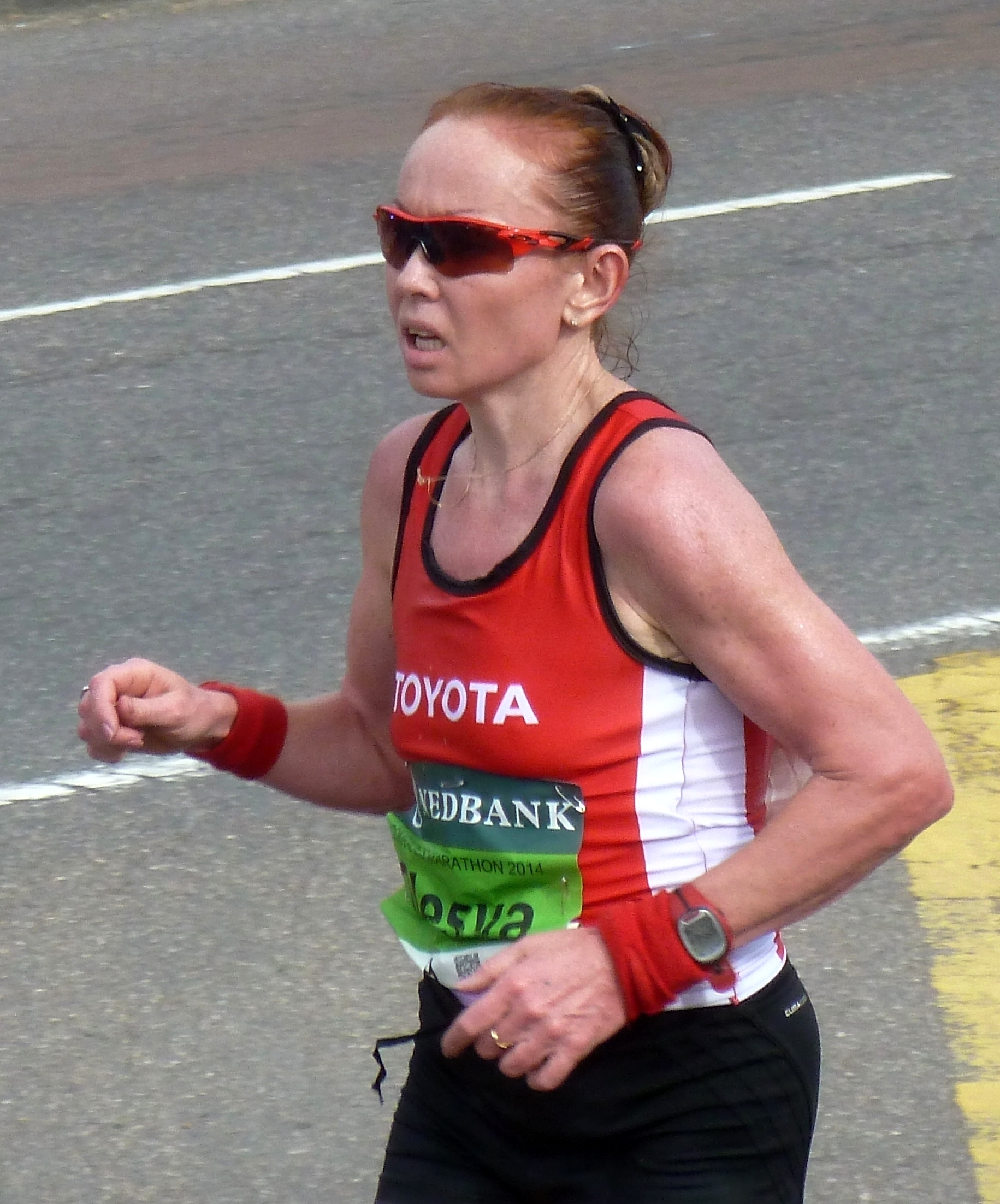
Olesya running in Pinetown during the 2014 Comrades Marathon

Olesya Leonidovna Nurgalieva (born 9 January 1976 in Perm Krai; Russian: Олеся Леонидовна Нургалиева) is a Russian ultramarathon runner. She won the Two Oceans Marathon 3 times and the Comrades Marathon twice, and together with her identical twin Elena Nurgalieva dominated the Comrades and Two Oceans, South Africa's main ultramarathons, from 2003 to 2014.

== Ultramarathon career ==
Nurgalieva won the 42.2 km Honolulu Marathon in 2005, the 56 km Two Oceans Marathon in 2008, 2010 and 2011, and the Comrades Marathon in 2007 and 2009.

Comrades Marathon Results
Year	Direction	Time	Position
2014	Down	06:24:51	3
2013	Up	06:28:07	2
2012	Down	withdrew	n/a
2011	Up	06:24:36	2
2010	Down	06:13:05	2
2009	Down	06:12:12	1
2008	Up	06:15:52	2
2007	Down	06:10:03	1
2005	Down	06:10:40	2
2004	Up	06:20:32	4
2003	Down	06:12:08	2
