= Elena Nurgalieva =

Russian ultramarathon runner

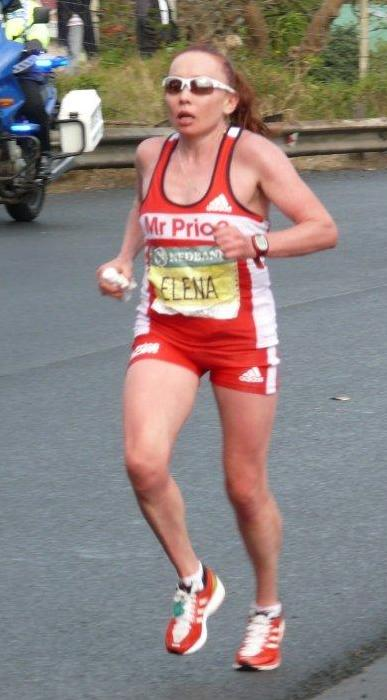
Elena Nurgalieva running in the 2012 Comrades Marathon

Elena Leonidovna Nurgalieva (born 9 January 1976 in Perm Krai; Russian: Елена Леонидовна Нургалиева) is a Russian ultramarathon runner. She won the Comrades Marathon 8 times and the Two Oceans Marathon 4 times, and with her identical twin Olesya Nurgalieva dominated the Comrades and Two Oceans Marathons, South Africa's main ultramarathons, from 2003 to 2014.

== Ultramarathon career ==
Nurgalieva is an eight-time winner of the Comrades Marathon.

Year	Direction	Time	Position
2015	up	6:40:36	3
2014	Down	6:23:18	2
2013	Up	6:27:09	1
2012	Down	06:07:12	1
2011	Up	06:24:11	1
2010	Down	06:13:04	1
2009	Down	06:13:14	2
2008	Up	06:14:37	1
2007	Down	06:10:32	2
2006	Up	06:09:24	1
2005	Down	06:12:19	3
2004	Up	06:11:15	1
2003	Down	06:07:47	1

She has won the 56 km Two Oceans Marathon four times, in 2004, 2005, 2009 and 2012.
