= Comrades Marathon =

Ultramarathon in South Africa

- The Comrades Marathon logo
- Date: May / June
- Location: Durban / Pietermaritzburg, South Africa
- Event type: Road
- Distance: Ultramarathon (90 km)
- Established: 1921; 105 years ago
- Course records: Down: Men: Tete Dijana 5:13:58 (2023); Women: Gerda Steyn 5:44:54 (2023); Up: Men: George Kusche 5:15:56 (2026); Women: Gerda Steyn 5:44:53 (2026)
- Website: The Comrades Marathon
- 2026 Comrades Marathon

The Comrades Marathon is an ultramarathon of approximately 88 kilometres (55 mi) which is run annually in the KwaZulu-Natal province of South Africa between the cities of Durban and Pietermaritzburg. It is the world's largest and oldest ultramarathon race. The direction of the race alternates each year between the "up" run (87.6 km) starting from Durban (elevation: 8 metres (26 ft)) and the "down" run (89.98 km) starting from Pietermaritzburg (elevation: 655 metres (2,149 ft)).

In all but three editions since 1988, over 10,000 runners have reached the finish within the allowed 11 or 12 hours. Since the 1980s, increased participation has coincided with substantial rises in both average finish times and the average age of finishers.

== Course ==
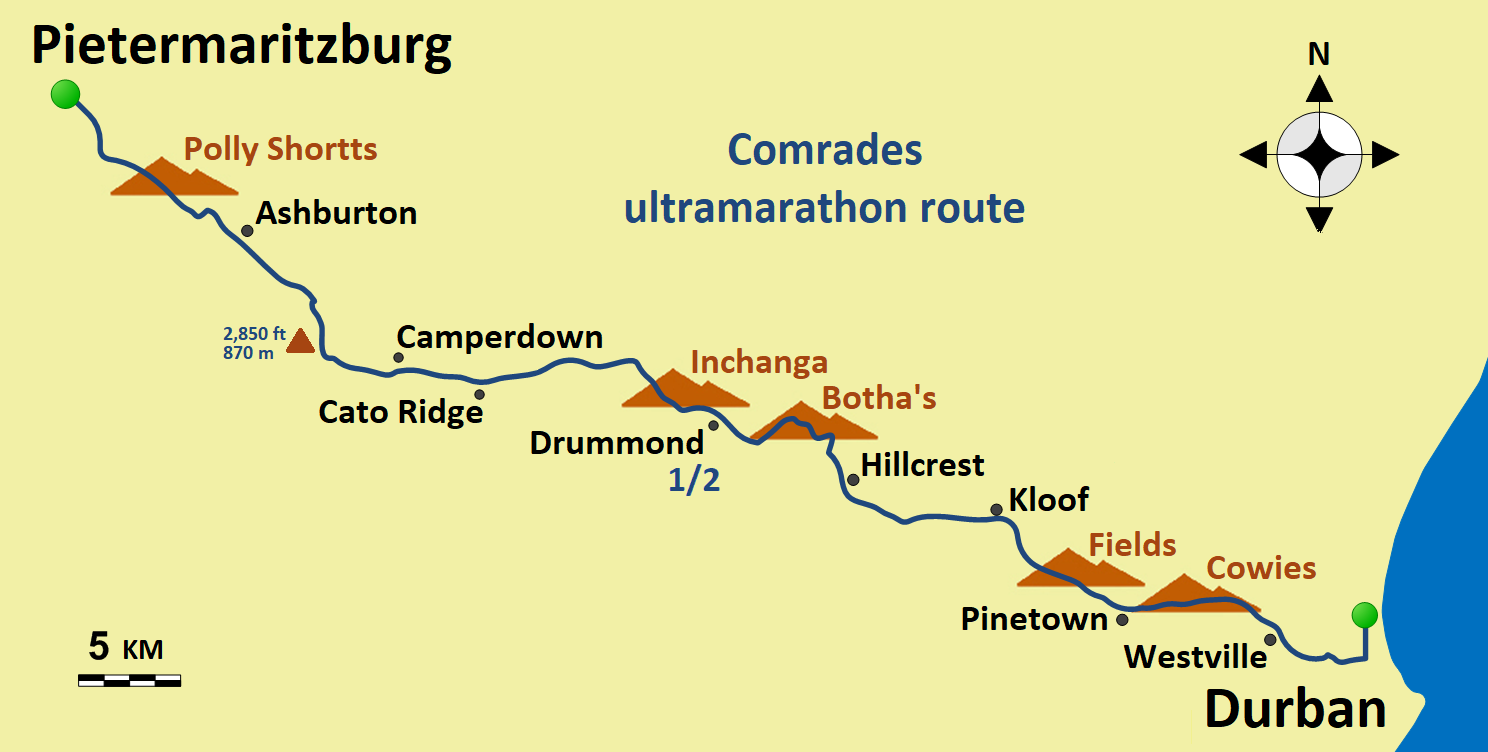
Course of the ultramarathon

“Listen, listen, laduma, laduma. There's a distant sound of thunder and a crackling of lightning on the horizon, and a great black and gold mist is starting to roll down the road from Pietermaritzburg, down Polly Shortts, through Camperdown, through Cato Ridge, through Drummond Village, over mighty Inchanga Mountain, all the way to Kingsmead. And they're calling. They're calling me. They're calling me—the singing, the thunder, and the black and gold mist. So I must answer that call. And I must go. Ziyasha. This is it.”

Spoken word poem by Bruce Fordyce

The Comrades Marathon is run on the roads of KwaZulu-Natal province between Durban and Pietermaritzburg, with the direction alternating each year between the "up" and "down" runs. The route is defined by five major hills—Cowies Hill, Fields Hill, Botha's Hill, Inchanga, and Polly Shortts—collectively known as the “Big Five.” These hills vary in length, gradient, and strategic placement, and feature prominently in both directions of the race. The highest point on the course lies near the Umlaas Road interchange at about 2,850 feet (870 m) above sea level. Approximately 40 official refreshment stations line the course, offering runners water, energy drinks, fruit, and snacks, along with first aid and physiotherapy points at key locations.

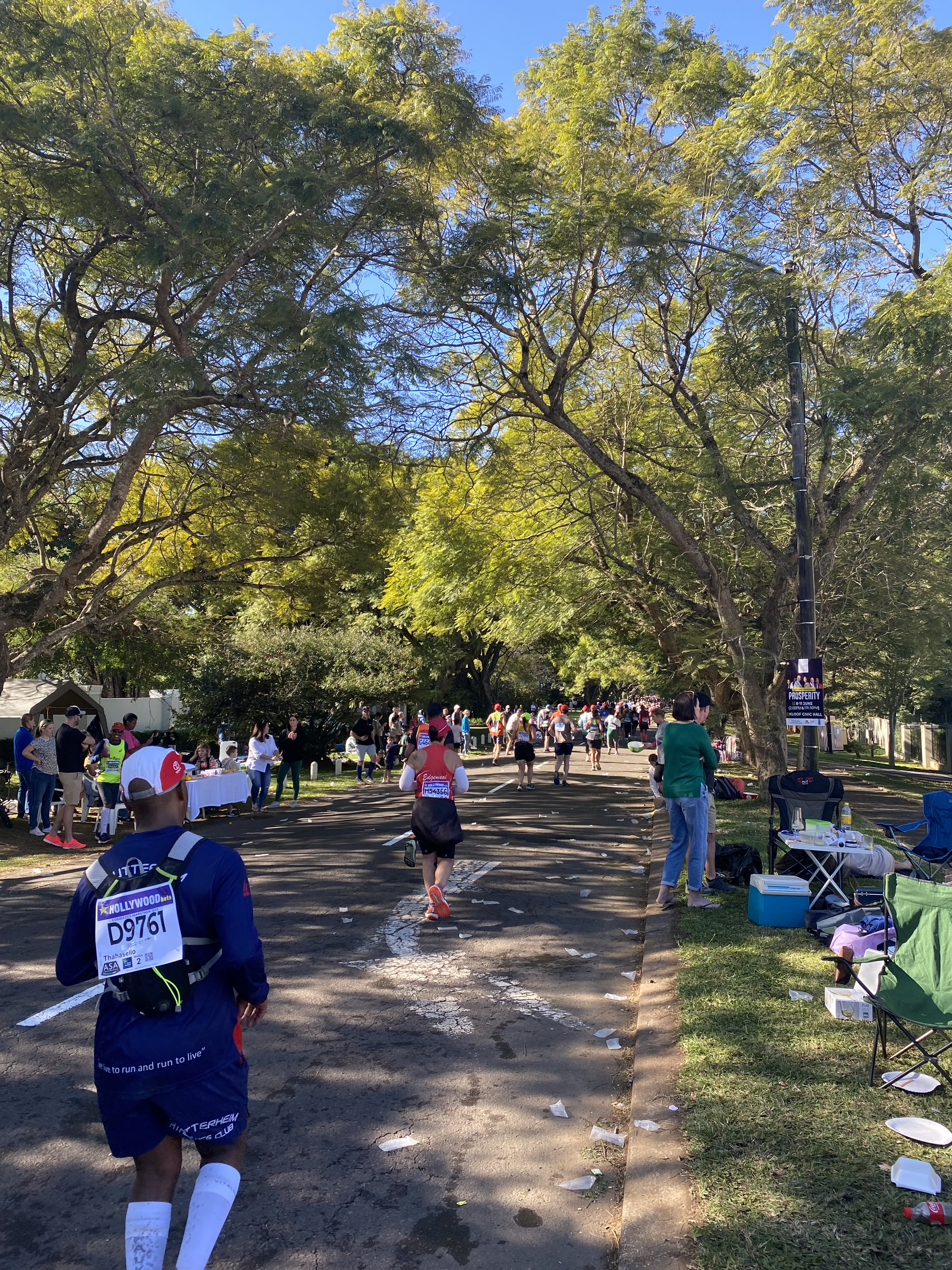
Runners in Kloof during the 2023 Comrades Marathon

=== 'Up' run ===
In an "up" run year, the Comrades Marathon covers approximately 87 kilometres from Durban on the Indian Ocean coast to the inland city of Pietermaritzburg, gaining over 1,800 metres in elevation. The early stages feature the most sustained climbing, with a net elevation gain of over 500 metres in the first 22 kilometres. The route begins with a gradual ascent out of Durban, including long pulls through Tollgate and Mayville, before encountering the first of the five major hills.

Cowies, Fields, and Botha's Hills appear in the first half of the route, demanding early restraint from runners seeking to conserve energy. After the halfway mark near Drummond, the course continues to undulate through the KwaZulu-Natal countryside. Inchanga, a long and winding ascent, tests endurance just after halfway. The highest point on the course is reached at Umlaas Road, before the route drops briefly into Ashburton and rises again for the steep climb of Polly Shortts, located within the final 10 kilometres. Though shorter in distance than some earlier hills, Polly Shortts is the steepest and often the most decisive, arriving when fatigue is at its peak. The final stretch into Pietermaritzburg features several smaller climbs and descents before reaching the finish line.

=== 'Down' run ===
In a "down" run year, the Comrades Marathon follows a route of approximately 90 kilometres from Pietermaritzburg to Durban, descending from around 660 metres above sea level to near sea level. While the net elevation profile trends downhill, the course includes significant climbs and undulations throughout. From the start at the Pietermaritzburg City Hall, runners ascend gently through the suburbs before tackling early challenges such as Polly Shortts and Little Polly's. The route then rises to Umlaas Road—the highest point on the course—before descending through Camperdown and Cato Ridge into the Harrison Flats region.

The second half of the race includes the long descent from Inchanga into Drummond (the halfway point), followed by a climb through Alverstone and Botha's Hill. Notable features include Fields Hill, a steep and sustained descent into Pinetown, and Cowies Hill shortly afterward. These downhill sections, while advantageous for pacing, are known to strain the quadriceps and test runners' resilience. After navigating the M13 through Westville and 45th Cutting, participants descend toward Durban, finishing outside the Moses Mabhida Stadium via contraflow routes and city streets. Despite its name, the down run demands careful pacing, as late-race climbs and cumulative impact can be decisive.

The race route alternates annually between an “up run” and a “down run”, with total race distance varying slightly depending on roadworks, route modifications, and safety planning.

== History ==
The Comrades Marathon, first held on 24 May 1921, is one of the world's oldest and most prestigious ultramarathons. Conceived by World War I veteran Vic Clapham to honour fallen soldiers, the race was intended as a test of endurance and resilience. Apart from brief interruptions during World War II and the COVID-19 pandemic (2020–2021), it has taken place annually. Over 300,000 runners have completed the course between Durban and Pietermaritzburg, alternating annually between the "up" and "down" routes.

The early decades of the race saw significant individual achievements and growing popularity. Bill Rowan won the first edition in 1921, and Arthur Newton dominated the 1920s with five wins. Women were initially unofficial participants—Frances Hayward ran in 1923 without formal entry. The 1930s were defined by runners like Hardy Ballington and Wally Hayward, with the latter continuing his legacy into the 1950s and eventually becoming the oldest finisher at age 80 in 1989.

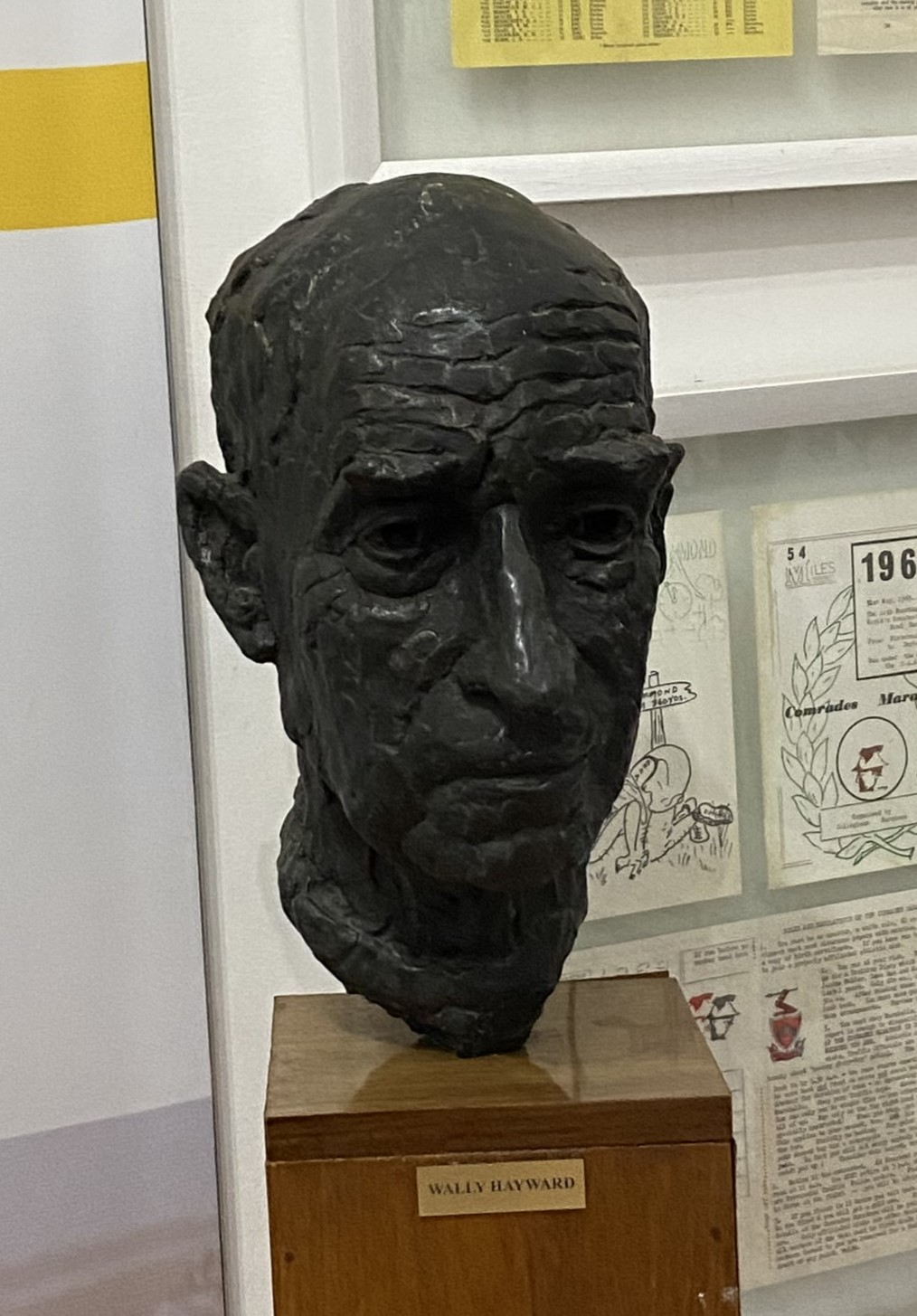
A bust of Wally Hayward displayed in the Comrades House

The 1940s introduced traditions like Max Trimborn's rooster crow at the start, which replaced the starter's gun and remains part of the race to this day. From the 1960s through the 1980s, the Comrades expanded significantly. The race opened to international competitors and, in 1975, officially welcomed black runners and women with Vincent Rakabele becoming the first black runner to officially win a medal and Elizabeth Cavanaugh becoming the first official women's winner. Milestones included Bruce Fordyce’s nine titles and Frith van der Merwe’s remarkable women's course record in 1989. The 1980s also marked the emergence of black champions like Sam Tshabalala and pioneering black female finishers like Olive Anthony. Television coverage, increased participation, and record-breaking performances made this era foundational for the race's modern stature.

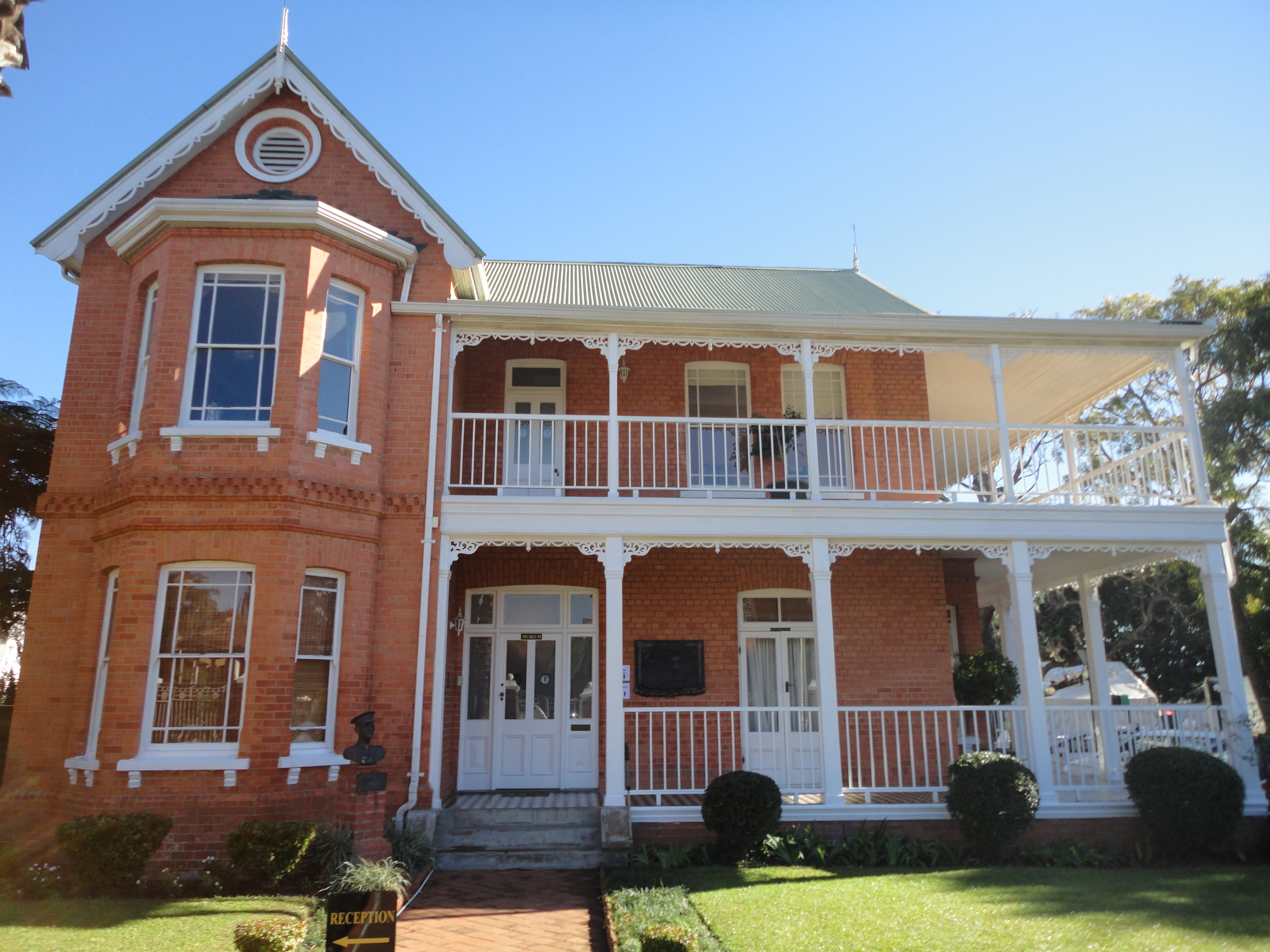
Comrades Marathon House, the CMA's headquarters in Pietermaritzburg where race statistics and memorabilia are kept

In the 1990s and 2000s, the Comrades became more global and professional. Prize money was introduced in 1995, attracting elite international athletes. The race date shifted from Republic Day to Youth Day, reflecting South Africa's changing political context. The 2000 race drew nearly 24,000 entrants to celebrate the 75th anniversary, and in 2010, the event entered the Guinness World Records for most finishers in an ultramarathon. Runners like Leonid Shvetsov (2007 & 2008) and David Gatebe (2016) set course records, while athletes such as Stephen Muzhingi and the Russian identical twin sisters Olesya and Elena Nurgalieva dominating multiple editions - the sisters winning 10 races between them.

After a two-year hiatus due to COVID-19, the Comrades returned in 2022 with a capped field and the slogan "The Return – Sishay' Ibuya." Recent years have seen athletes like Gerda Steyn and Tete Dijana achieving multiple victories.

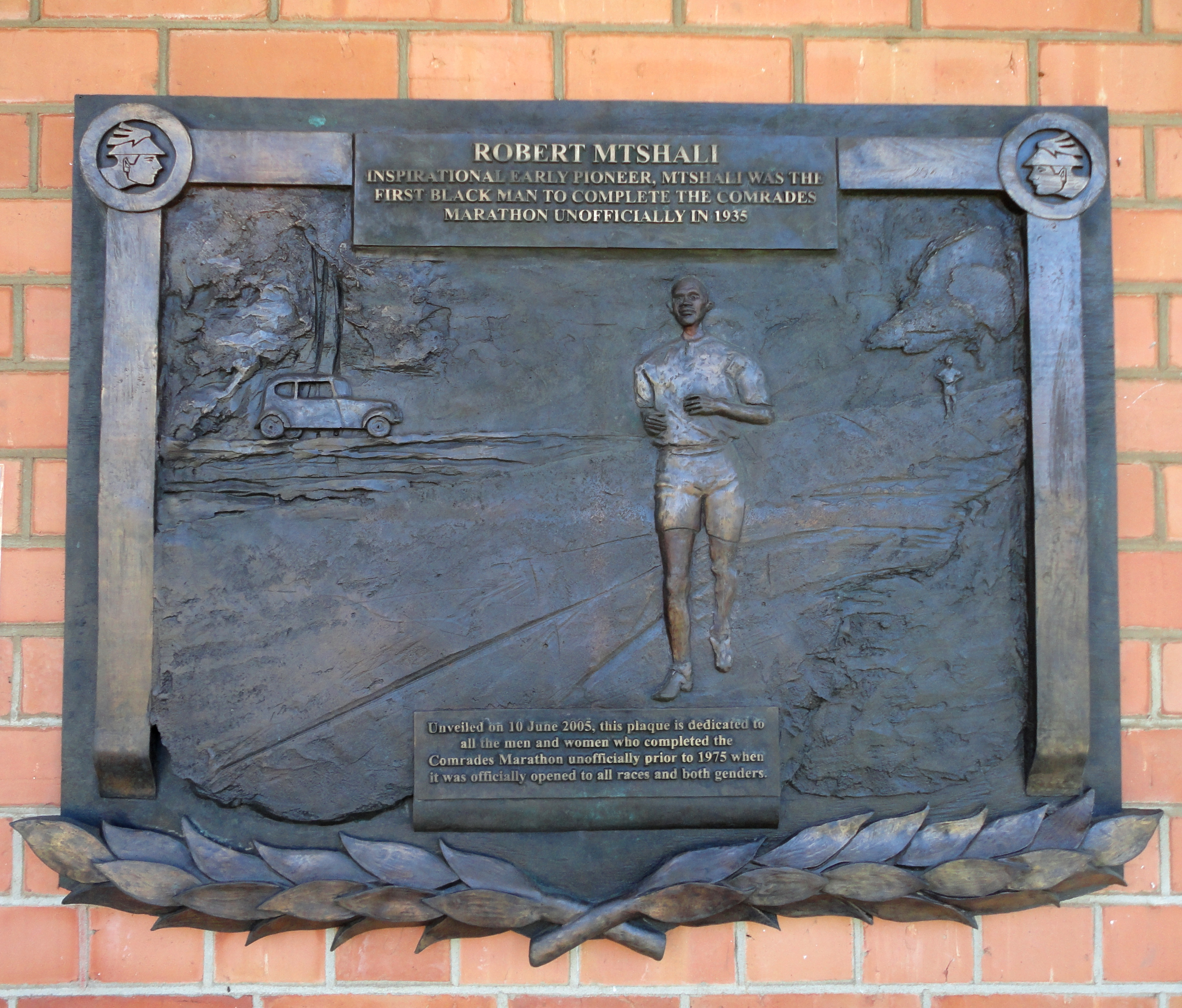
A plaque in honour of Robert Mtshali, a finisher in 1935, though non-white athletes only competed officially since 1975. The Robert Mtshali medal was introduced in 2019.

== Rules ==
Runners over the age of 20 are eligible to qualify after completion of an officially recognised marathon (42.2 km) in under 5 hours (4:50 hours before 2019). During the event an athlete must also reach five cut-off points in specified times to complete the race.

Athletes currently have 12 hours to complete the course, extended from 11 hours in 2003 (including a special 12 hour allowance in the year 2000). The original Comrades cut-off time from 1921 to 1927 was also 12 hours, reduced to 11 hours in 1928.

A runner who successfully completed nine marathons wears a yellow number, while those who completed ten races wear a green number permanently allocated to the runner for all future races. Runners running their 20th, 30th and 40th races are also indicated by green numbers – differently formatted on different years.

== Medals ==
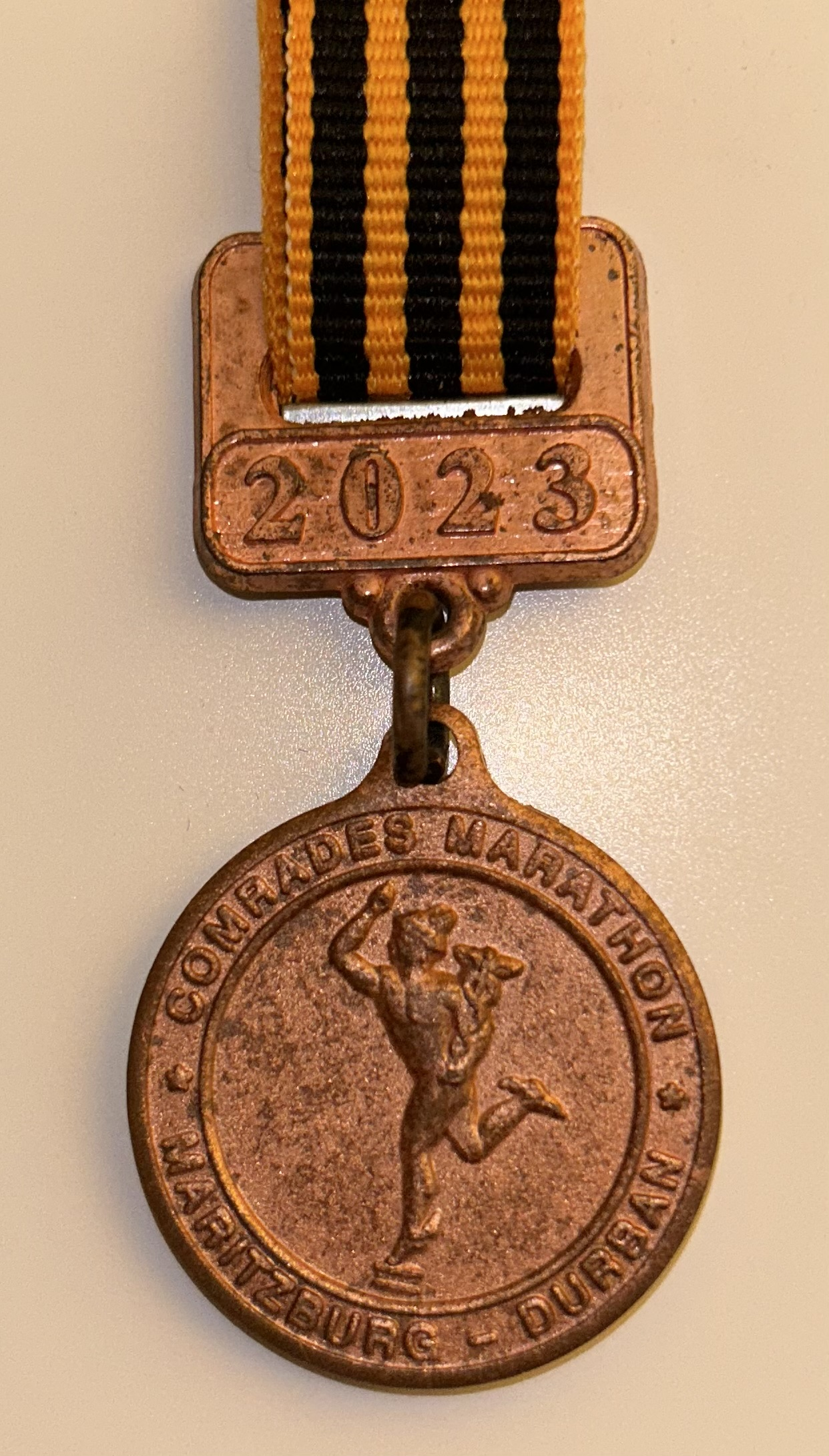
Vic Clapham medal from the 2023 Comrades Marathon, awarded to finishers who complete the race between 11:00:00 and 11:59:59

Medals are awarded to all runners completing the course in under 12 hours. Medals are currently awarded as follows:

Medals awarded in the Comrades Marathon
Medal	Time Range / Criteria	Design	Notes
Gold	Top 10 men and top 10 women	Solid gold-coloured	Awarded to the first ten finishers in each gender category.
Wally Hayward	11th place to sub-6:00 (men only)	Silver centre with gold ring	Introduced in 2007. Named after five-time winner Wally Hayward, who was the first winner to run under 6 hours when in won in 1953. Often rarer than a gold medal.
Isavel Roche-Kelly	11th place to sub-7:00 (women only, as of 2024)	Silver centre with gold ring	Introduced in 2019. Named after the first woman to break 7h30 in 1980, and then the first to break 7 hours in 1981. Cut-off reduced from 7h30 to 7h00 in 2024.
Silver	6:00 to sub-7:30 (men); also 7:00 to sub 7:30 for women from 2024 onward	Solid silver-coloured	Awarded to runners just outside elite level. Reinstated for women in 2024.
Bill Rowan	7:30 to sub-9:00	Bronze centre with silver ring	Introduced in 2000. Named after the inaugural 1921 winner who ran 8:59.
Robert Mtshali	9:00 to sub-10:00	Titanium	Introduced in 2019. Honours the first unofficial black participant (1935) who ran 9h30.
Bronze	10:00 to sub-11:00	Solid bronze-coloured	Traditional medal for those finishing solidly within the cut-off.
Vic Clapham	11:00 to sub-12:00	Copper	Introduced in 2003 when cut-off was extended to 12 hours. Named after the race founder.
Back-to-Back	Awarded to novices who complete their second race consecutively	Dual medal design	Introduced in 2005. For runners completing an 'up' and 'down' run in successive years.

== Traditions ==
The Comrades Marathon has several long-standing traditions that are central to its identity. One of the most notable is the annual alternation between the “up” run and the “down” run, with each route offering distinct physical challenges.

At the start line, runners observe a set sequence: the South African National Anthem is played, Shosholoza is sung, Chariots of Fire by Vangelis is played, a recording of Max Trimborn's rooster crow is played, and then the starting gun is fired.

About halfway into the race, runners pass Arthur's Seat, a small recess in the bank near Drummond. It is believed to have been a race-day resting spot for five-time winner Arthur Newton. Tradition holds that greeting "Arthur" or placing a flower there brings good luck for the second half of the race.

As they enter the final straight, the leading man and woman are given a scroll bearing a goodwill message from the mayor of the starting city to the mayor of the finishing city, symbolizing the link between Durban and Pietermaritzburg. In addition, each of the top 10 male and female finishers is handed a red rose as they enter the finishing straight.

At the end, the 12-hour cutoff is strictly enforced. A gun is fired exactly at the time limit, and runners who haven't finished are not counted as official finishers. Immediately after, The Last Post is played by a lone bugler to mark the close of the event.

== Results ==
The Comrades Marathon results show over a century of competitive endurance running. Bill Rowan won the first race in 1921 in 8:59:00, and Arthur Newton dominated the 1920s with five wins. Wally Hayward and Bruce Fordyce became major figures, with Hayward winning five times across the 1930s to 1950s, and Fordyce winning nine times in the 1980s. The women's race, officially recognised from 1975, saw standout performances like Frith van der Merwe’s 5:54:43 in 1989, a record that stood for decades. In the 2000s, Russian athletes Elena and Olesya Nurgalieva were dominant, winning most of the women's races between 2003 and 2015.

From 2014 onwards, South African athletes began winning more consistently. Bongmusa Mthembu won three titles, and David Gatebe set the men's down run record of 5:18:19 in 2016. Gerda Steyn has become the leading figure in the women's field, breaking the down run record in 2023 (5:44:54) and the up run record in 2024 (5:49:46). On the men's side, Tete Dijana broke the down run record on his way to his second victory in 2023, while Dutch runner Piet Wiersma won in 2024 and finished second in 2023. Since the end of COVID-related cancellations in 2020 and 2021, the race has returned with faster times and stronger fields, both local and international. The 2025 down run was won by Tete Dijana (5:25:28) and Gerda Steyn (5:51:19).

To date, Bruce Fordyce holds the record for the most men's victories with nine wins, while Elena Nurgalieva leads the women's field with eight wins.

== Records and statistics ==
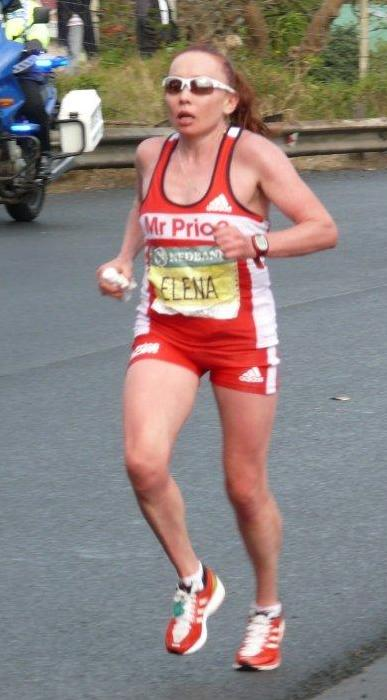
Elena Nurgalieva leading at the 65 kilometres (40 mi) mark in the 2012 Comrades

The Comrades Marathon's fastest recorded times are 5:13:58 for men (Tete Dijana, 2023 down run) and 5:44:54 for women (Gerda Steyn, 2023 down run). Steyn also holds the up-run record, becoming the first woman to break 6 hours with her 5:49:46 in 2024. The most gold medals earned in the women's race is 13 by Elena Nurgalieva, while Allan Robb leads the men's race with 12 gold medals won.

The race also highlights endurance over decades. Louis Massyn has completed 50 Comrades Marathons — the most in history. In 2023 Johannes Maros Mosehla became the oldest known finisher aged 81, a record he extended in 2024 and 2025. He beat the record held by Wally Hayward, who completed the race at age 80 in 1989, 58 years after his first win.

== Waypoints ==
Course waypoints and distances
Landmark	Distance	Location
Pietermaritzburg City Hall: down run 5:30 starting point	0 km	29°36′07″S 30°22′46″E
Scottsville racecourse: up run finish till 17:30	0 km	29°36′42″S 30°23′56″E
Polly Shortts (summit): up run 16:40 cutoff	7 km	29°39′17″S 30°25′34″E
Polly Shortts (bottom)	9 km	29°39′30″S 30°26′32″E
Ashburton (Little Pollys)	10 km	29°40′02″S 30°26′51″E
Lion Park: down run 8:00 cutoff	14 km	29°41′41″S 30°29′22″E
Highest point (2,850 ft / 870 m): up run 15:00 cutoff	18 km	29°42′50″S 30°29′43″E
Camperdown	25 km	29°43′41″S 30°32′27″E
Cato Ridge: up run 13:40, down run 9:50 cutoffs	30 km	29°43′59″S 30°35′25″E
Harrison Flats	32 km	29°43′37″S 30°36′42″E
Ethembeni School	34 km	29°43′31″S 30°39′15″E
Inchanga (summit)	37 km	29°44′40″S 30°40′41″E
Halfway mark Drummond: up, down run 11:40 cutoffs	43 km	29°44′58″S 30°42′08″E
Arthur's Seat	44 km	29°45′13″S 30°42′21″E
Wall of Honour	45 km	29°45′15″S 30°42′27″E
Alverstone	47 km	29°45′32″S 30°43′19″E
Botha's Hill (summit)	49 km	29°44′56″S 30°44′12″E
Kearsney College	51 km	29°45′30″S 30°45′08″E
Hillcrest	54 km	29°46′48″S 30°45′49″E
Winston Park: up run 10:00, down run 13:30 cutoffs	56 km	29°47′39″S 30°47′06″E
Kloof	61 km	29°47′28″S 30°49′58″E
Fields Hill	64 km	29°47′38″S 30°50′57″E
Pinetown: up run 08:10, down run 14:50 cutoffs	67 km	29°49′01″S 30°52′00″E
Cowies Hill (summit)	72 km	29°49′45″S 30°53′09″E
Westville	78 km	29°49′57″S 30°55′56″E
45th Cutting: down run 16:30 cutoff	80 km	29°49′58″S 30°58′07″E
Durban City Hall: up run 5:30 starting point	87 km	29°51′29″S 31°01′32″E
Moses Mabhida Stadium: down run finish till 17:30	90 km	29°49′40″S 31°01′50″E

== Health issues ==
As with every ultramarathon, there are potentially lethal health risks involved in extreme physical events. In the history of the Comrades, there have been 8 deaths up to the 2022 event. In a survey among a sample of 2005 participants, 25% reported cramps, 18% nausea, 8% vomiting, 13% dizziness, 3% diarrhoea, 23% pain, excluding the expected sore legs, and 14% reported fatigue of such a nature that they believed themselves to be incapable of continuing the race. Among silver medalists there was a higher incidence of cramps (42.9%), nausea (21.4%) and diarrhoea (7.1%), though a lower incidence of pain and fatigue than the average runner.

== Charts ==
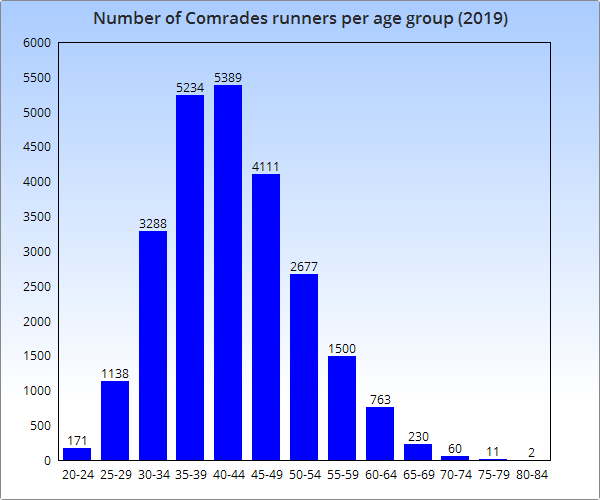
Comrades runners per age group

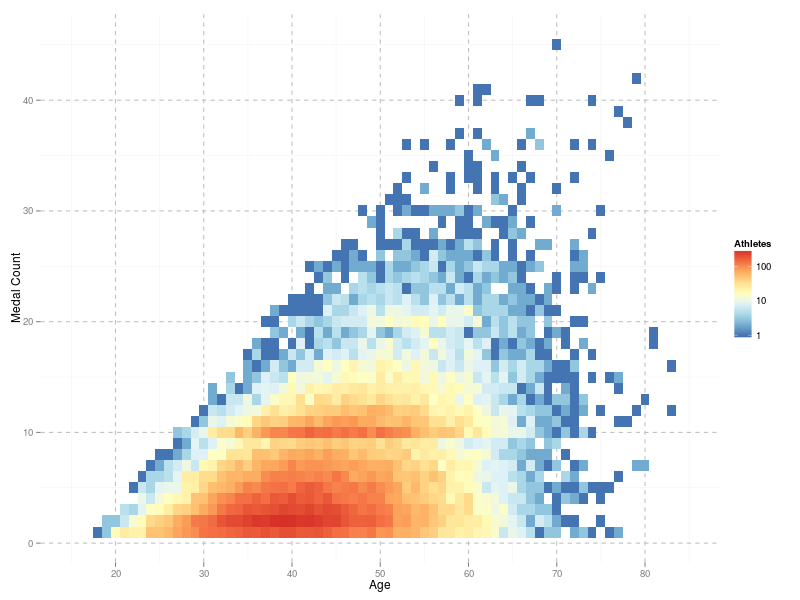
Finishers as a function of age and number of medals

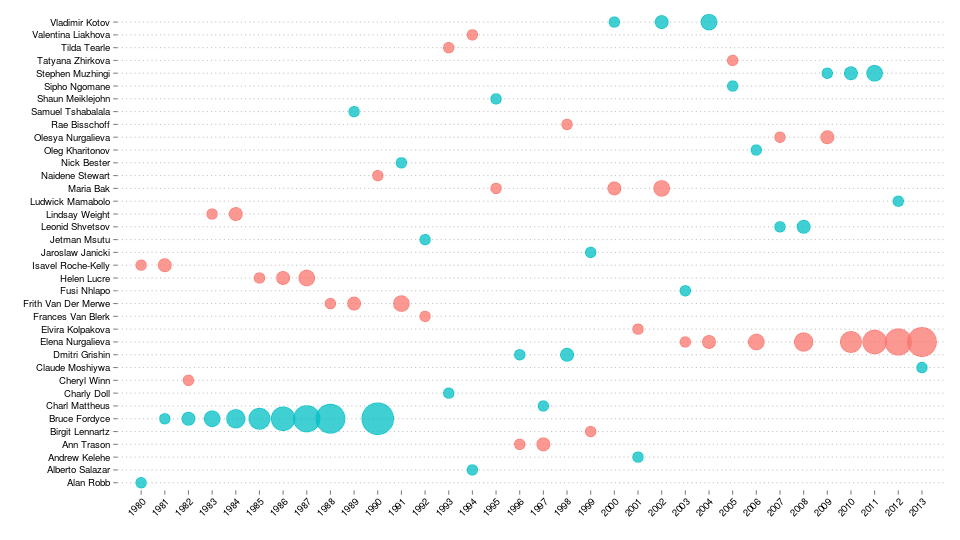
Recent winners

== Depictions in other media ==
The Long Run was a 2001 film set in 1999, in which a retired running coach trains a woman for the race. 'Comrades' was a 2008 film about seven diverse runners attempting the race.

In 2023, the documentary Down: A Comrades Story was released. It explores the history of the Comrades Marathon through the personal stories of the many athletes who have competed in it. As of 2025, it is available on YouTube.
