= Kuyedinsky District =

Kuyedinsky District Куединский район (Russian)
- District
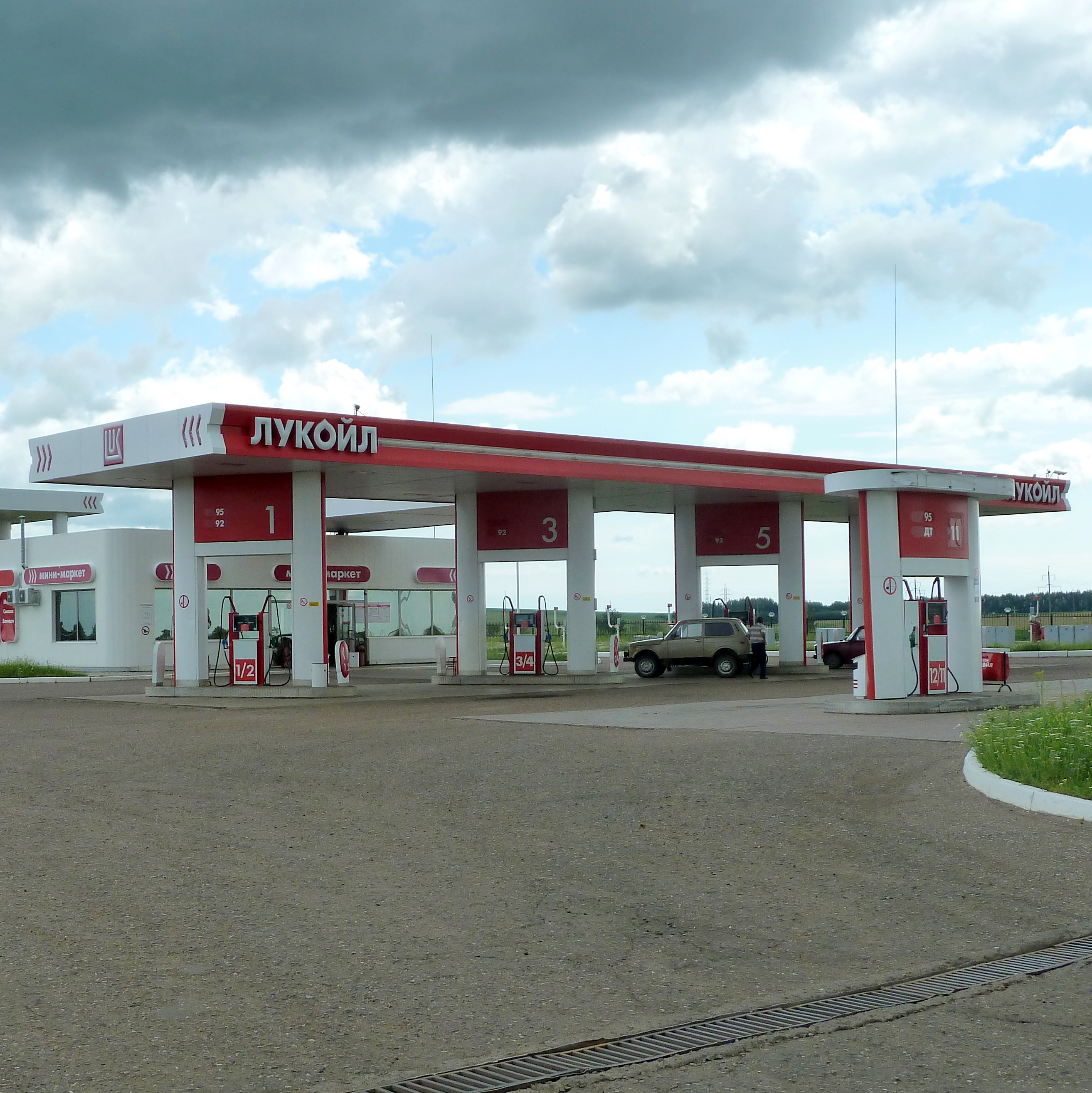
- Service station in Kuyedinsky District

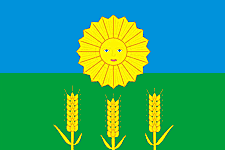
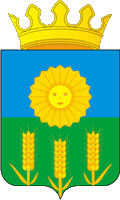
- Flag Coat of arms
- Location of Kuyedinsky District in Perm Krai
- Coordinates: 56°25′49″N 55°35′07″E
- Country: Russia
- Federal subject: Perm Krai
- Established: June 10, 1931
- Administrative center: Kuyeda

Area
  - Total: 2,617 km^{2} (1,010 sq mi)

Population (2010 Census)
  - Total: 26,952
  - Density: 10.30/km^{2} (26.67/sq mi)
  - Urban: 0%
  - Rural: 100%

Administrative structure
  - Inhabited localities: 83 rural localities

Municipal structure
  - Municipally incorporated as: Kuyedinsky Municipal District
  - Municipal divisions: 0 urban settlements, 10 rural settlements
- Time zone: UTC+5 (MSK+2)
- OKTMO ID: 57628000
- Website: http://www.admkueda.ru/

Kuyedinsky District (Russian: Куеди́нский райо́н) is an administrative district (raion) of Perm Krai, Russia; one of the thirty-three in the krai. Municipally, it is incorporated as Kuyedinsky Municipal District. It is located in the south of the krai and borders with Bardymsky District in the north, Chernushinsky District in east, the Republic of Bashkortostan in the south, the territory of the town of krai significance of Chaykovsky in the west, and with Yelovsky District in the northwest. The area of the district is 2,617 square kilometers (1,010 sq mi). Its administrative center is the rural locality (a settlement) of Kuyeda. Population: 26,952 (2010 census); 31,429 (2002 census); 33,465 (1989 Soviet census). The population of Kuyeda accounts for 35.4% of the district's total population.

== Geography ==
The district's landscape is mostly flat with some hills in the north and east. Climate is temperate continental.

== History ==
The district was established on June 10, 1931.

== Demographics ==
Ethnic composition as of the 2002 Census:

- Russians: 64.2%
- Udmurt people: 17.7%
- Tatars: 7.4%
- Bashkirs: 6.2%
- Chuvash people: 2.8%

== Economy ==
The economy of the district is based on agriculture, oil industry, and food industry.

== Notable residents ==
- Elena and Olesya Nurgalieva (born 1976), identical twin ultramarathon runners

== Sources ==
- Законодательное собрание Пермской области. Закон №416-67 от 28 февраля 1996 г. «Об административно-территориальном устройстве Пермского края», в ред. Закона №504-ПК от 9 июля 2015 г. «О внесении изменений в Закон Пермской области "Об административно-территориальном устройстве Пермского края"». Вступил в силу с момента опубликования. Опубликован: "Звезда", №38, 12 марта 1996 г. (Legislative Assembly of Perm Oblast. Law #416-67 of February 28, 1996 On the Administrative-Territorial Structure of Perm Krai, as amended by the Law #504-PK of July 9, 2015 On Amending the Law of Perm Oblast "On the Administrative-Territorial Structure of Perm Krai". Effective as of the moment of publication.).
- Законодательное собрание Пермской области. Закон №1759-363 от 10 ноября 2004 г. «Об утверждении границ и о наделении статусом муниципальных образований Куединского района Пермского края», в ред. Закона №273-ПК от 14 декабря 2013 г. «О внесении изменений в отдельные Законы Пермской области, Коми-Пермяцкого автономного округа, Пермского края». Вступил в силу через десять дней со дня официального опубликования. Опубликован: "Бюллетень Законодательного Собрания и администрации Пермской области", №12, I часть, 9 декабря 2004 г. (Legislative Assembly of Perm Oblast. Law #1759-363 of November 10, 2004 On Establishing the Borders and on Granting the Status to the Municipal Formations of Kuyedinsky District of Perm Krai, as amended by the Law #273-PK of December 14, 2013 On Amending Various Laws of Perm Oblast, Komi-Permyak Autonomous Okrug, Perm Krai. Effective as of the day which is ten days following the day of the official publication.).
