= Kuyeda (settlement) =

Rural locality in Perm Krai, Russia

Coordinates: 56°25′42″N 55°35′26″E

Kuyeda (Russian: Куеда) is a rural locality (a settlement) and the administrative center of Kuyedinsky District of Perm Krai, Russia. Population: 9,551 (2010 census); 9,809 (2002 census); 9,613 (1989 Soviet census).

== History ==
The settlement started in 1915 as a railway station during the construction of the Kazan–Yekaterinburg line. It was named after a nearby village which, in turn, got its name from the Kuyeda River.
