= Multiday race =

Running event across multiple days

Multiday races are ultramarathon running events which are typically either segmented into daily events of a specified distance or time, or staged so that runners can run as far as they want, at their own discretion, over a set course or over a set number of days. Multiday races can range from continuous 48-hour track events to staged transcontinental treks.

== Beyond the marathon ==
Very long endurance running events can be divided into three broad categories: the traditional 26.2-mile (42.2 km) marathon, the ultramarathon—defined as any event longer than the marathon—and true multiday events, which begin with the 24-hour event and can stretch out almost indefinitely, often ranging from six days to 3,100 miles (5,000 km) or longer.

Multiday events are usually timed races, such as 48-hour, 72-hour, and 6-day races. Set-distance races depend on the ability of the runner to complete them, and what may be a multiday event for slower runners may be an ultra for faster athletes. For example, the Badwater Ultramarathon, a 135 miles (217 km) race, has a 48-hour time limit, but winners typically finish in under 24 hours.

== Types of courses ==
Many multiday races are held on tracks or measured loops, which eases the provision of aid station support for runners. Stage races are the alternative; these include point-to-point races such as the Trans-American races, which traverse the North American continent coast to coast, and the Gobi March, a seven-day journey across the Gobi Desert; the Kalahari Augrabies Extreme Marathon, a 7-day, 250 km trail event in the Kalahari Desert; and the Yukon Arctic Ultra, a 430/300/100/26 mile challenge crossing Yukon in the dead of winter.

Longer multiday races include the Trans-Europe race, which ran from Lisbon to Moscow in 2003, a distance of about 5,100 kilometres. These events take the runner to a different level, where the race becomes a way of life and where nutrition, sleep, energy, and psychological states have to be carefully managed. The Self-Transcendence 3100 Mile Race is the longest certified footrace in the world.

== The past ==
The golden era of multiday races stretches back to the 1870s and 1880s, when they were held on indoor tracks and offered substantial prizes. Known as pedestrians, these athletes established records which in some cases have stood until recently. In summer 1809 in Newmarket, England, Robert Barclay Allardice, better known as Captain Barclay, ran/walked one mile (1.6 km) for each consecutive hour, each consecutive day, totalling 1,000 miles (1,600 km).

The most common multiday race of the era was the six-day race, which ran from Monday to Saturday with Sunday being observed as a rest day. In 1878, Sir John Dugdale Astley was inspired to create a series of five international six-day races, in which competitors vied for the Astley Belt. Two early competitors were the American Edward Payson Weston, who covered 500 miles (800 km) in 6 days. The Englishman Charles Rowell covered 241 km in the first day of a 6-day races in the 1880s.

By the early 1890s, public enthusiasm for such events had moved into bicycle racing, and the multiday running craze came to an end. Interest grew again in the late 1920s, with the advent of Trans-America races. These events were transcontinental stage races that inspired a new generation to challenge the huge distance.

== The recent past ==
There was little reward for these races in the long run, and it was not until the 1980s that interest re-awoke in true multi-day races. In 1980, San Francisco postal delivery worker Don Choi organized the first modern era six-day race, on a track in Woodside, California. In recent years, several multiday races have stood out, among them the Australian Westfield Sydney to Melbourne races, which were run from 1983–1991, and the Colac (1983–2005) race which is no longer being held. August 2012 will see possibly the final 64 stage Trans-Europe race organised by Ingo Schulze. Sri Chinmoy Races hosts several multi-day events annually in the US: six- and ten-day races, a 3,100-mile (5,000 km) race, and several 24- and 48-hour events in Europe, Asia, Australia and New Zealand.

== The present ==
Sri Chinmoy Races continues to host several multi-day events annually in the US: six- and ten-day races, a 3,100-mile (5,000 km) race, and several 24- and 48-hour events in Europe, Asia, Australia and New Zealand. Other regular 48 hour to 10 day events are held in the US at Across the Years in Arizona and 6 Days in the Dome, which includes a ten day option at the Pettit National Ice Center in Milwaukee WI. Other international multi-day races include Trans-Gaule, Trans-Germany - the Deutschlandlauf, Trans-Korea as well as occasional Trans-Am and Trans-Australia races plus several 6 day events in Europe and South Africa. The RacingThePlanet's 4 Deserts Race Series and the Marathon des Sables are among the most popular multiday races taking place today.

== Notable pedestrians ==
- Edward Payson Weston
- Daniel O'Leary
- Foster Powell
- Charles Rowell
- Fred Hitchborn
- George Littlewood
- Robert Barclay Allardice

== Notable multiday runners ==
- Ashprihanal Pekka Aalto
- Sandy Barwick
- Suprabha Beckjord
- Patrycja Bereznowska
- Don Choi
- Dipali Cunningham
- Serge Girard, trans-USA (1997), trans-South America (2001), trans-Africa (2003/2004) and trans-Eurasia (2005/2006) record holder
- Camille Herron
- Al Howie
- Rimas Jakelaitis
- Yiannis Kouros
- Achim Heukemes, trans-Australia record holder
- Surasa Mairer
- Lorna Michael, first woman to complete trans-USA (1993)
- Stu Mittleman, US record holder for six-day race (578 miles)
- Stine Rex
- Wolfgang Schwerk
- William Sichel, World #1 for 6-day race in 2009, World M55 record holder
- Samuel Thompson, Ran 1,310 miles (2,110 km) in 50 consecutive marathon races (August 19, 2006)
- Kobi Oren

== Well-known multiday races ==
- 4 Deserts Atacama Crossing, Gobi March, Sahara Race, The Last Desert
- Australian 6 Day Race
- Antibes 6 Day Race
- Across The Years
- 6 Days in the Dome (now in Milwaukee, USA)
- Athens International Ultramarathon Festival (24/48/72h, 6 days, 1000k, 1000m)
- Cliff Young Australian 6-day race
- Marathon des Sables
- Self-Transcendence 6- & 10-day Race
- Self-Transcendence 3100 Mile Race
- Surgères 48 Hour Race
- Trans Europe Foot Race 2009
- Vienna-Bratislava-Budapest Supermarathon
- Kalahari Augrabies Extreme Marathon
- UltraCentric
- World Marathon Challenge
- Yukon Arctic Ultra

== See also ==
- International Association of Ultrarunners
- Ultramarathon
- Beach Walking
