= 6 day race =

Standard multi-day footrace distance

The 6-Day Race became a standard footrace distance in the 1870s and was a popular form of entertainment with up to 70,000 paying visitors during such a Pedestrians event. However the widespread use of the bicycle from 1890 caused it to be replaced as spectator sport by cycle races of the same duration. It was in two forms: strict "heel-and-toe" racewalking, or "go-as-you-please" combination of walking, jogging, running.

== History ==
In 1773, Foster Powell, of England, started the focus on walking/running for six days when he walked from London to York and back, 400 miles (640 km), in six days and is considered the “Father of the Six-Day Race.” The first six-day race in history was put on by P.T. Barnum of circus fame, in his New York City Hippodrome on March 1, 1875, between Edward Payson Weston and "Professor" John R. Judd. Weston won with 431 miles (694 km) to Judd's 222 miles (357 km). The second race was held November 15, 1875, between Weston and Daniel O'Leary in Chicago, Illinois, with O'Leary emerging victorious with 503 miles (810 km) and Weston finished with 451 miles (726 km). On March 6, 1876, the first six-day race was held in England, inside the Royal Agricultural Hall, in Islington, London, won by Weston with 450 miles (720 km). His nearest competitor, W. Newman finished with 190 miles (310 km). The first six-day race between women was held in 1876, in Chicago Illinois, between Bertha Von Hillern and Mary Marshall. Marshal won with 233.9 miles (376.4 km) to 231.5 miles (372.6 km).

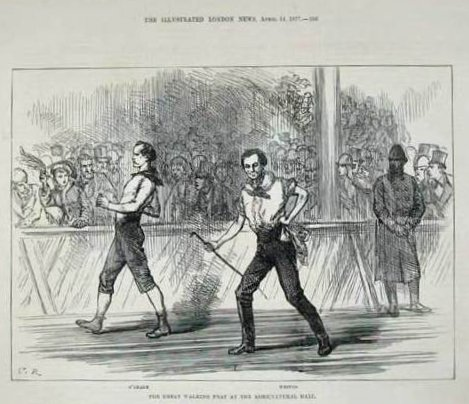
Edward Payson Weston (right) and Daniel O'Leary in their fight in 1877 at the Agricultural Hall in London

In a re-match between Weston and O'Leary in 1877, O'Leary was victorious again and the excitement created enough interest for Sir John Dugdale Astley, a British Member of Parliament, to inaugurate a series of 6 day races to determine the "Long distance Champion of The World". These became known as the "Astley Belt" races and cash prizes were offered. O'Leary won the first two and was thwarted by Charles Rowell in his quest for three in a row. Weston won the fourth, setting a record of 550 miles (890 km) and Rowell won the final three multiday races to permanently keep the Astley Belt.

=== The 1879 World Championship ===
==== Results ====
P.	Athlete	Nationality	Miles	Km
1	George Guyon	Canada	480 1/4	772.89
2	Frederick Krohne	United States	461	742
3	John P. Colston	Sweden	452 1/5	727.5
4	Charles Faber	United States	450 1/8	724.6
5	Ben Curran	United States	438 1/4	705.1
6	Peter N. Campana	United States	401 1/3	645.8
7	W.H. Davis	United States	225	362.1

Intermediate results:

- 24 hours: Guyon 105 miles; Faber 100; Byrne 95; Washington 93.5; Krohne 91; Campana 86; Colston 82; Curran 80; Urann 78; Kent 75; Forrester 67.5; Davis 60. Retired: Cotton (60) and Stark (52).
- 48 hours: Guyon 187 miles; Faber 178; Krohne 172; Campana 165; Washington 161; Curran 159; Colston 150; Kent 142; Forrester 118; Davis 102. Retired: Byrne (104) and Urann.
- 72 hours: Guyon 267 miles; Krohne 254; Faber 250; Campana 236; Colston 226; Curran 224; Washington 213; Kent 211; Davis 152
- 96 hours: Guyon 345 miles; Krohne 335; Faber 314; Colston 300; Curran 296; Campana 292; Davis 188.

In 1880, Frank Hart set a new record of 565 miles (909 km) earning $17,000, a fortune at the time.

Between 26 November and 1 December 1888, George Littlewood of Sheffield, England, created a new world record of 623 miles 1,320 yards—a record that wasn't beaten for 96 years.

By the early 1890s the six-day races were in decline and no longer drawing the public or offering large prizes. They were discontinued by 1903 because local laws were passed to disallow amusement events lasting more than a day.

It wasn't until Don Choi hosted a 6-day race on July 4, 1980. at Woodside California that interest began to grow again. Briton Mike Newton became the first man to cover 500 miles/800 km in a modern 6-day race at Nottingham in November 1981. In 1982, Tom O'Reilly took the 6-day total to 576 miles/927 km. In 1984 Yiannis Kouros twice ran over 1,022 km (635 mi) setting a new world record that would stand until 2005 when he broke his own record again with 1,036 km (644 mi) at the Cliff Young Australian 6-day race in Colac, Australia. This record would stand until 2024 when Matthieu Bonne ran 1,046km in Hungary. In 2025, this record was surpassed by Iván Zaborski, who ran 1,047.5 km in France.

The Women's Race:

In 1876, May Marshall won the first women's 6-day race, with a final distance of 233 miles (375 km).

In May 2025, Megan Eckert set the then current women's World Record of 970.685 kilometres (603.156 mi) at the Six Days of France race.

In September 2026, Megan Eckert was the overall winner of the EMU-GOMU 6-Day World Championships in Balatonfüred, Hungary, breaking her own 2025 women's World Record with a finish distance of 1,024 kilometres (636 mi), becoming the first woman ever to break the 1000 km barrier, and breaking the Overall American record.

== Current 6-Day Races ==
- 6 Days in The Dome
- 6 DAYS UMF Italian UltraMarathon Festival
- 6 Jours de France
- Across the Years
- Antibes 6 Day Race (Now known as 6 Jours de France)
- Arizona 6 Day
- Athens 6 Day Race
- Australian 6 Day Race
- British Ultra Fest
- EMU 6 Day Race World Trophy (Hungary)
- Hallsberg 6 Day (Sweden)
- No Finish Line 6 Day
- Self-Transcendence 6 day
- South Africa 6 Day Circuit
- Three Days At The Fair (2017
- Viadal Ultra Six Days (Sweden)
- The Old Six Day

== Literature ==
- The Six-Day Race, Part One: When Ultrarunners Were Called Pedestrians (1875-1879), by Davy Crockett
- Ultramarathoning: The Next Challenge, by Tom Osler and Ed Dodd
- Ultrarunning magazine
- Multiday Running Magazine
- King of the Peds, by P.S. Marshall
