= Self-Transcendence 3100 Mile Race =

World's longest certified footrace

Coordinates: 40.715556°N 73.799653°W

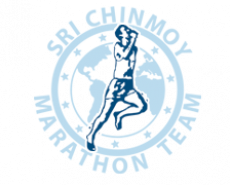
- Logo
- Date: June–August
- Location: Jamaica, Queens, New York City, New York, United States
- Event type: Ultramarathon
- Distance: 3,100 miles (5,000 km)
- Beneficiary: Sri Chinmoy Marathon Team
- Established: 1985 — 1,000 miles; 1987 — 2004 Ultra Trio (700, 1,000 and 1,300-miles); 1996 — 2,700 miles (4,345 km); since 1997 — 3,100 miles
- Course records: 3,100; M: 40 days 09:06:21 (Finland) Ashprihanal Pekka Aalto (2015); F: 45 days 12:28:44 (Taiwan) Tsai Wen-ya (2023)
- Website: 3100.srichinmoyraces.org

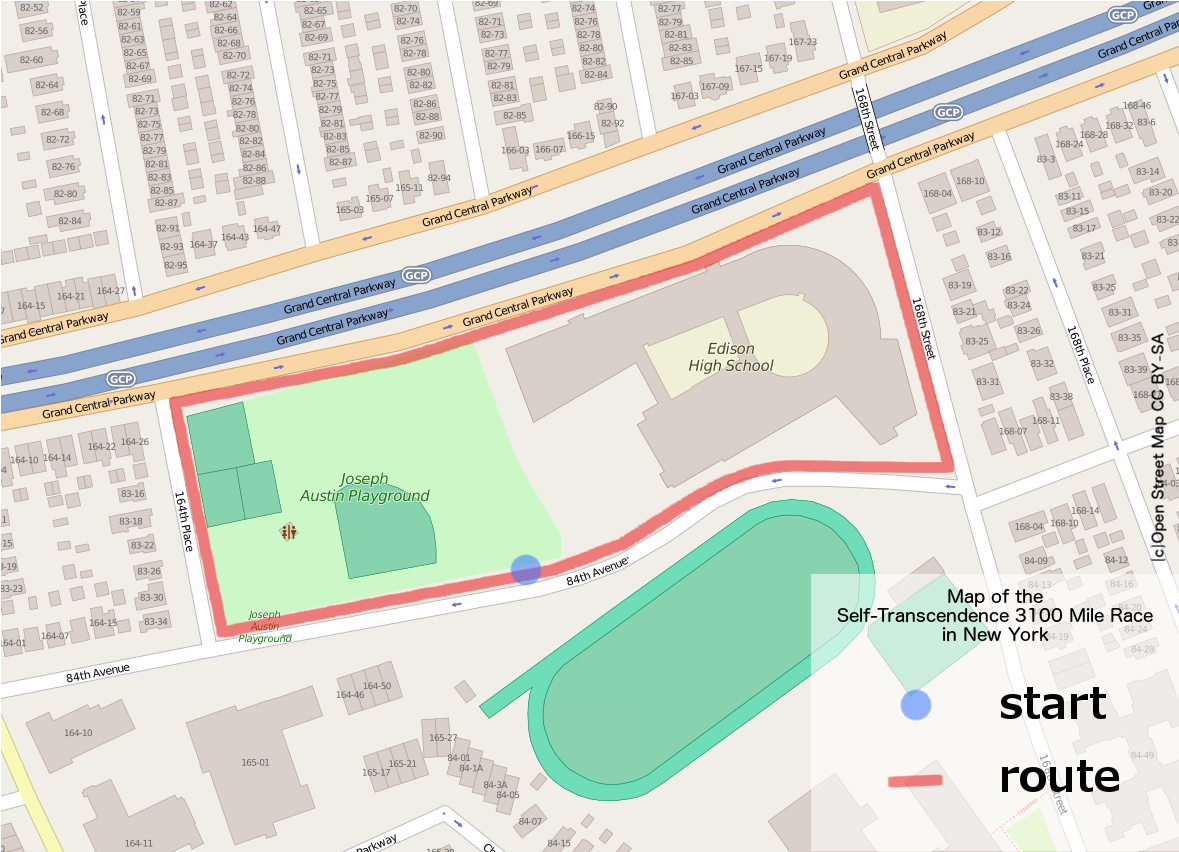
Map

The Self-Transcendence 3100 Mile Race is the world's longest certified footrace. In 1996 Sri Chinmoy created this event as a 2,700-mile (4,345 km) race. At the award ceremony that year he declared that the 1997 edition would be extended to 3,100 miles (4,989 km).

This race, which lasts several weeks, is hosted by the Sri Chinmoy Marathon Team and takes place every summer in Queens, New York City. The course is 3,100 miles (4,989 km) long. Runners negotiate 5,649 laps of one extended city block in Jamaica, Queens, bounded by 164th Place, Abigail Adams (84th) Avenue, 168th Street, and the Grand Central Parkway — a distance of 0.5488 miles (883 m) — while the streets are in normal use. The runners have 52 days to complete the distance, running from 6 a.m. to midnight, an average of 59.62 miles (95.95 km) every day. The prize is typically a T-shirt, a DVD, or a small trophy.

== History ==
The Self-Transcendence 3100 mile was founded by Sri Chinmoy out of his wish to create an opportunity for runners to discover the limits of their capacities and to try to go beyond them. Hence, the name "Self-Transcendence", which is appended to many of the footraces that the Sri Chinmoy Marathon Team hosts. Since 1985 when the group first began holding races, the focus on the ultramarathon and multiday races has grown from the Ultra Trio, three races with staggered starts of 700, 1000 and 1300-mile duration that take place in September, and the spring races, which include the Self-Transcendence 6-Day race and one of a very few such races in the world, the Self-Transcendence 10-Day race.

In 1996 Sri Chinmoy created this event as a 2,700-mile (4,345 km) race. At the award ceremony that year he declared that the 1997 edition would be extended to 3,100 miles (4,989 km). The length of 3,100 is possibly a reference to the birth year of Sri Chinmoy, 1931. The race has been run at this distance every year since.

In 2020, it was held in Salzburg, Austria due to the COVID-19 pandemic, from September 13 to November 3.

In 2021, with the continuing COVID-19 pandemic, organisers decided to move the start date for the race from its usual date, mid-June, to Sunday, September 5, 2021.

11 runners were selected for 2022 and the race took place from Sunday, September 4 to Tuesday, October 25.

== Race ==
The race distance is the distance from the west to the east coast of the US, plus 11 marathons. For their safety, only runners with proven ultra-running experience are encouraged to apply. The race is run daily, changing direction each day, whatever the weather, which has ranged from 38 °C (100 °F) heat to torrential downpour—runners sometimes carry umbrellas. Competitors run among people going about their everyday lives, dodging pedestrians and cyclists, students at Thomas A. Edison High School, and occasionally large crowds during various events or celebrations.

Sri Chinmoy said that the Self-Transcendence challenges runners to "transcend their own previous capacity", "gain spiritual insights" and "overcome the entire world's pre-conceived notions of possibility". Runners have spoken of "the most overwhelming moment", "When you run a marathon, you feel good ... when you run 3,100 miles, you feel even better still".

Vegetarian meals are provided by volunteers from an improvised kitchen; runners need to eat constantly, burning 10,000 kcal a day. Runners have six hours at night for eating, washing, foot care and sleep before returning to the course for the 6:00am start.

The race can be followed on the race website; regular updates for the participants are published there, and a webcam has been operating during recent years. An album of photo images is also published, several days a week, to record race activity.

== Records and winners ==
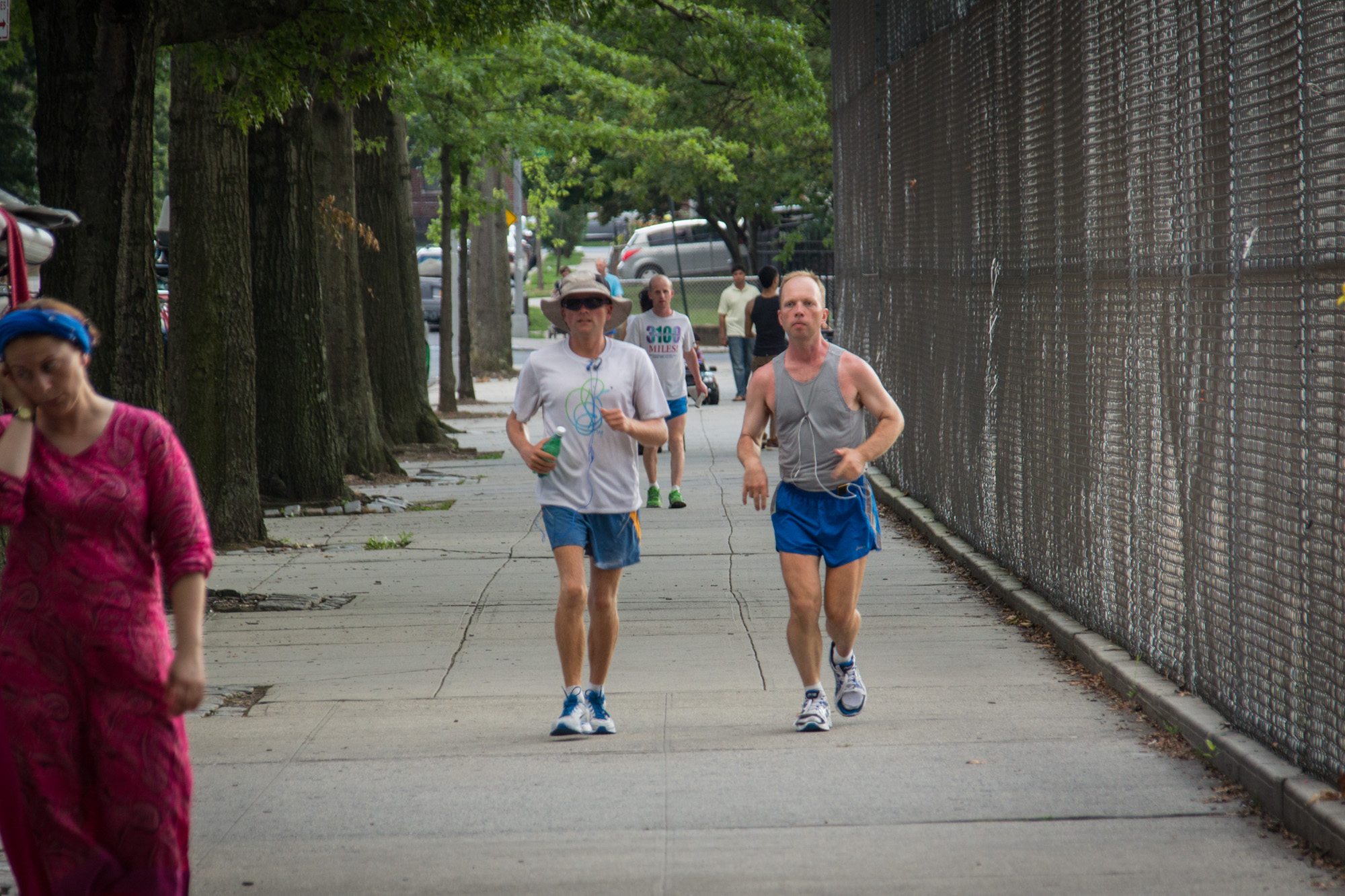
2012

=== Records ===
The world record is held by Ashprihanal Aalto (FIN) who finished with a time of 40 days 09:06:21 in July 2015, breaking the previous record of 41 days 08:16:29 held by Madhupran Wolfgang Schwerk (GER). The women's record is held by Tsai Wen-ya (TWN) who completed 3100 miles in 45 days 12:28:44 in 2023. She broke the 48 days 14:24:10 record set by Kaneenika Janakova (SVK) in 2017. Suprabha Beckjord (USA) is the only person to have completed every edition of the race (until 2009). Ashprihanal Aalto has won the race nine times and participated 15 times.

== List of winners ==
Winners of 700, 1000, 1300, and 2700 mile races (predecessors of 3100-mile Race)

Date	Distance	Men			Women		
Year	Miles	Country	Athlete	Time	Country	Athlete	Time (days, hours, minutes, seconds)
1985	1000						
1986	1000	(United States)	Stu Mittleman	11:20:37:00			
1987	700; 1000; 1300	(Greece) (United States) (United States)	Yiannis Kouros; Tom Grace; Marty Sprengelmeyer	150 miles 567 miles 1250 miles	(Canada) (United States) (Japan)	Antana Locs; Pippa Davis; Izumi Yamamoto	691 miles 832 miles 825 miles
1988	700; 1000; 1300	(United Kingdom) (Greece) (Germany)	Sauriya Clarc; Yiannis Kouros; Stefan Schlett	11:05:42:00; 10:10:30:36; 1172 miles	(United States) (New Zealand) (Japan)	Suprabha Schechter; Sandra Barwick; Izumi Yamamoto	10:13:03:45; 14:20:45:16; 230 miles
1989	700; 1000; 1300	(United States) (United States) (Canada)	Noivedya Brower; John Wallis; Al Howie	11:17:57:00; 14:09:45:04; 17:08:25:34	(United States) (United States) -	Essie Garrett; Suprabha Schechter -	12:19:26:36; 14:20:18:24
1990	700; 1000; 1300	(England) (Canada) (United States)	Peter Hodson Al Howie Ronnie Wong	11:13:38:49 13:09:19:38 1177 miles	(United States) (Germany)	Suprabha Schechter Christel Volmerhausen	13:53:00:00; 1119 miles
1991	700; 1000; 1300	(United States) (Canada)	Thomas Possert; Al Howie	13:14:02:52; 16:19:00:00	(New Zealand)	Sandra Barwick	17:22:46:07
1992	700; 1000; 1300	(Hungary)	István Sipos	09:14:43:30 - -	(United States)	Suprabha Beckjord	
1993	700; 1000; 1300	(United Kingdom) (Moldova) (Hungary)	Jeffrey Covell; Aleksandr Chulakov; István Sipos	11:12:12:13; 14:18:29:45; 16:17:36:14	(Austria) (Australia) (Canada)	Monika Shamita Achenbach-König; Dipali Cunningham; Antana Locs	11:20:42:46; 15:12:52:02; 18:12:34:35
1994	700; 1000; 1300	(Serbia) (United States) -	Aleksandar (Namitabha) Arsic; Marty Sprengelmeyer -	11:14:30:29; 14:08:00:20 -	(Australia) (Romania) (Canada)	Catherine Dipali Cunningham; Silvia Andonie Graziano; Antana Locs	10:05:32:58; 14:18:52:38; 18:18:49:42
1995	700; 1000; 1300	(Serbia) (Latvia)	Sasa Djordjevic Georgs Jermolajevs	12:01:47:46 - 16:14:00:00	(Australia) (Canada)	Catherine Dipali Cunningham; Dhvaja Dorn -	09:15:14:46; 15:22:39:35 -
1996	700; 1000; 1300; 2700	(United States) (Hungary) (Latvia)	John Wallis; István Sipos Georgs Jermolajevs	10:07:25:54; 13:22:27:27 - 40:11:00:00	(Austria) - (United States)	Paula Surasa Mairer - Suprabha Beckjord -	11:09:11:05 - 43:01:00:00 -
1997	700; 1000; 1300; 2700	(Italy) (Latvia) (Latvia)	Nicola Sinisgalli; Georgis Jermolajevs Georgs Jermolajevs	10:18:41:31; 12:01:25:47 - -	(Austria) (Australia) - -	Paula Surasa Mairer; Dipali Cunningham - -	10:20:20:25; 13:20:18:40 - -

Winners of 3100-mile race (best times: colored background)
Date	Distance	Men			Women		
Year	Miles	Country	Athlete	Time (days, hours, minutes, seconds)	Country	Athlete	Time (days, hours, minutes, seconds)
1997	3100	United States	Edward Kelley	47:15:19:56	United States	Suprabha Beckjord	51:02:09:56
1998	3100	Hungary	István Sipos	46:17:02:06	United States	Suprabha Beckjord	49:14:30:54
1999	3100	United States	Edward Kelley	48:12:42:46	United States	Suprabha Beckjord	51:14:16:17
2000	3100	Finland	Ashprihanal Aalto	47:13:29:55	United States	Suprabha Beckjord	54:15:51:34
2001	3100	Finland	Ashprihanal Aalto	48:10:56:12	United States	Suprabha Beckjord	52:10:37:42
2002	3100	Germany	Madhupran Wolfgang Schwerk	42:13:24:03	United States	Suprabha Beckjord	51:12:08:06
2003	3100	Serbia	Namitabha Arsic	49:02:24:45	United States	Suprabha Beckjord	56:03:00:22
2004	3100	Finland	Ashprihanal Aalto	46:06:55:11	United States	Suprabha Beckjord	55:13:13:00
2005	3100	Serbia	Srdjan Stojanovich	46:10:51:16	United States	Suprabha Beckjord	63:04:23:28
2006	3100	Germany	Madhupran Wolfgang Schwerk	41:08:16:29	United States	Suprabha Beckjord	60:04:35:24
2007	3100	Finland	Ashprihanal Aalto	43:04:26:32	United States	Suprabha Beckjord	58:07:54:27
2008	3100	Finland	Ashprihanal Aalto	44:02:42:15	United States	Suprabha Beckjord	56:17:51:22
2009	3100	Finland	Ashprihanal Aalto	43:16:28:06	United States	Suprabha Beckjord	60:08:58:51
2010	3100	Finland	Ashprihanal Aalto	46:07:37:24	No finisher	—	—
2011	3100	Ukraine	Sarvagata Ukrainskyi	44:13:38:52	Austria	Surasa Mairer	53:15:54:25
2012	3100	Australia	Grahak Cunningham	43:10:36:39	No entrants	—	—
2013	3100	Russia	Vasu Duzhiy	47:05:39:00	Austria	Surasa Mairer	50:04:57:24
2014	3100	Ukraine	Sarvagata Ukrainskyi	44:06:58:10	Australia	Sarah Barnett	50:03:55:08
2015	3100	Finland	Ashprihanal Aalto	40:09:06:21	Austria	Surasa Mairer	49:07:52:24
2016	3100	Ukraine	Yuri Trostenyuk	46:01:10:25	Slovakia	Kaneenika Janakova	51:07:31:07
2017	3100	Russia	Vasu Duzhiy	46:17:38:22	Slovakia	Kaneenika Janakova	48:14:24:10
2018	3100	Russia	Vasu Duzhiy	44:16:03:53	Austria	Surasa Mairer	51:12:47:37
2019	3100	Finland	Ashprihanal Aalto	47:01:39:34	New Zealand	Harita Davies	51:09:35:20
2020	3100	Italy	Andrea Marcato	43:12:07:26	No entrants	—	—
2021	3100	Italy	Andrea Marcato	42:17:38:38	New Zealand	Harita Davies	50:13:23:14
2022	3100	Italy	Andrea Marcato	43:03:20:27	New Zealand	Susan Marshall	50:16:23:53
2023	3100	Italy	Andrea Marcato	43:13:33:23	Taiwan	Tsai Wen-ya	45:12:28:44
2024	3100	Italy	Andrea Marcato	43:03:04:06	No finisher	—	—
2025	3100	Italy	Andrea Marcato	46:16:19:10	Italy Romania	Daniela Bojila	51:08:17:28
2026	3100	Italy	Andrea Marcato	45:03:11:28	Australia	Annabel Hepworth	49:09:03:02

== See also ==
- Self-Transcendence 6- & 10-day Race

== Bibliography ==
- Cunningham, Grahak: Running Beyond The Marathon - insights into the longest footrace in the world, eText Press Publishing, 2012, ASIN B00AK1J0WS
- Emmaus, PA: Endurancs Special - An ultramarathon is one thing. But 3,100 miles around a city block is something else entirely. What does it take to endure the world's longest (and strangest) race?, Runner's World, Zürich 2007, OCLC 103305923
- Hoad, Richard: World's Toughest Endurance Challenges, Bloomsbury Publishing, 2012, ISBN 978-1408158852

== Filmography ==
- 2018 - 3100: Run and Become (dir. Sanjay Rawal)
- 2026 - The History of Concrete (dir. John Wilson)
