= George Littlewood =

English professional pedestrian

George Littlewood (1859–1912) was a professional pedestrian (ultradistance walking) known as the Sheffield Flyer who still holds the 6-day world record for walking (achieved in Sheffield, England, between 6 and 11 March 1882, on a 13-lap to the mile track, 531 miles).

Littlewood is also famous for setting the British 6-day race record of 623 miles 1,320 yards. This Multiday race took place at Madison Square Gardens in New York between 26 November and 1 December 1888. That world record wasn't beaten for 96 years.

== Biography ==
Littlewood was born on 20 March 1859, in Rawmarsh, Yorkshire, England.

In November 1879, Littlewood starred in his first race as a budding long-distance athlete in a six-day, 72-hour, 12 hours per day, 'go-as-you-please' event in which he came in fourth of 28 contestants winning a prize of £4 for scoring 275 miles in the allotted time on a 19-lap to the mile track at Wolverhampton.

He then went Nottingham, in February 1880, where, in a 7-day, six hours per night contest, he came in 5th of 19 runners, winning £2.

A couple of months later, he went to Leeds where he won his first race in a field of 13 contestants and created a new 12 hours per day, 72-hour world record of 374 miles on a 38-lap to the mile track in a circus rink. For winning, he secured the £35 first prize — plus an extra prize of £10 for beating the record. Littlewood would later remark that this was the greatest race he ever won.

His next event which was his first venture to London, where in September, of the same year, and competing in field of 29 at the Agricultural Hall, Islington, he won the Sir John Astley, 'Champion Gold Medal' and a prize of £60, which included £10 for beating the then world record of 405 miles.

Established as an up-and-coming figure in his chosen sport, his connections entered the then 21-year-old into the 6th international version of the Astley Belt: the blue riband 142-hour, six days, 'go-as you-please' contest, at the “Aggie”. He would compete against the reigning long-distance champion, Charles Rowell, a man, who only the year before at Madison Square Garden, New York, had secured the prize money of $50,000 in two races. During the race, in which he finished as runner-up with a score of 470 miles, George also took on “Blower” Brown of Fulham, and some American athletes.

Littlewood went over to the USA for the first time to compete in the '2nd O’Leary International Belt' contest at Madison Square Garden, in 1881. Although starting as the favorite, Littlewood only managed to make 480 miles due to a foot injury.

Then, in 1882, between 6 and 11 March, Littlewood achieved the unthinkable; not only did he beat the 142-hour heel-and-toe world walking record of 530 miles, he still holds it! The 531 miles were made on a 13-lap to the mile track at the Norfolk Drill Hall, Sheffield.

== Progress of Six-Day Walking World Record (1881–2018) ==
Name	Miles	KM	Venue	From	To	Year
Ivo Majetic (USA)	488	786	Balaton (HUN)	03-Sep	09-Sep	2018
Dominique Bunel (FRA)	467	752	Privas (FRA)	02-Aug	08-Aug	2015
John Dowling (IRE)	460	741	Nottingham (UK)	31-Jul	05-Aug	1983
George Littlewood (GBR)	531	854	Sheffield (UK)	06-Mar	11-Mar	1882
Charles Harriman (USA)	530	852	Chicago (USA)	09-May	14-May	1881

He competed in the 1st, 2nd, 3rd, 4th and 5th 'Astley Challenge Belt' races. The belt was the prize for winning the 12 hours a day, 72 hours per week version of the 'Long-Distance Astley Belt' and the events took place in Birmingham, Sheffield and London, between April 1882 and November, 1884. Littlewood would eventually win the belt outright.

In 1883, he also raced against a horse called Charlie in a 17-mile race from Doncaster to Sheffield. He lost by three quarters of a mile.

After that, in April 1885, Littlewood took on Rowell again (Rtd) in the 'International Pedestrian Tournament' and then again in February 1887 in the 'International Pedestrian Go-As-You-Please Tournament' (Won); both races being held at the Westminster Aquarium, London.

After those races he went back to America for the second time; firstly to Philadelphia, where he annihilated the opposition in November, 1887, in the 'Championship of the World Sweepstakes' before returning to New York to compete in his last two races at Madison Square Garden in May and December of the following year, 1888.

The May race saw Littlewood breaking the 600-mile barrier despite running on a raw bone in his foot and when he brought the Fox Diamond Belt back from America to England, they called him “Littlewood the Lionheart”.

In 1966, and referring to his 1888 world record, a physiologist, B.B. Lloyd, writing in Advancement of Science, described Littlewood's feat as “probably about the maximum sustained output of which the human frame is capable”.

== Professional Career Statistics (1879–1888) ==
Date Started	Venue	Date Finished	Pos	Miles	Type
10 November 1879	Wolverhampton, England	15 November 1879	4th	275	72-hr 'Go-As-You-Please'
9 February 1880	Nottingham, England	15 February 1880	5th	252	42-hr 'Go-As-You-Please'
29 March 1880	Leeds, England	3 April 1880	1st	374	72-hr 'Go-As-You-Please'
6 September 1880	London, England	11 September 1880	1st	406	72-hr 'Go-As-You-Please'
1 November 1880	London, England	7 November 1880	2nd	470	142-hr 'Go-As-You-Please'
23 May 1881	New York, USA	28 May 1881	10th	480	142-hr 'Go-As-You-Please'
6 March 1882	Sheffield, England	11 March 1882	1st	531	142-hr Walking (World Record)
24 April 1882	Sheffield, England	29 April 1882	Rtd	122	72-hr 'Go-As-You-Please'
25 September 1882	Birmingham, England	30 September 1882	1st	415	72-hr 'Go-As-You-Please'
16 November 1882	Sheffield, England	18 November 1882	1st	40	v A. Hancock
25 December 1882	Sheffield, England	30 December 1882	2nd	370	72-hr 'Go-As-You-Please'
14 May 1883	Sheffield, England	19 May 1883	1st	243	36-hr 'Go-As-You-Please'
24 December 1883	Sheffield, England	29 December 1883	1st	366	72-hr 'Go-As-You-Please'
24 November 1884	London, England	29 November 1884	1st	405	72-hr 'Go-As-You-Please'
27 April 1885	London, England	3 May 1885	Rtd	221	72-hr 'Go-As-You-Please'
21 February 1887	London, England	26 February 1887	1st	403	72-hr 'Go-As-You-Please'
21 November 1887	Philadelphia, USA	26 November 1887	1st	569	142-hr 'Go-As-You-Please'
7 May 1888	New York, USA	12 May 1888	1st	611	142-hr 'Go-As-You-Please'
27 November 1888	New York, USA	2 December 1888	1st	623	142-hr 'Go-As-You-Please'

== Death ==
Littlewood died on 4 December 1912 in Sheffield. His funeral was attended by 3,000 people.

== Bibliography ==
- Marshall, P.S. (2008). King of the Peds. AuthorHouse. ISBN 978-1434334671. 764pp.
