= Megan Eckert =

American ultramarathon runner, record holder

Personal information
- Born: August 11, 1986 (age 40)
- Website: https://meganeckert.com/

Sport
- Sport: Ultramarathon
- Events: Backyard ultra, 6-day race

Megan Eckert (born August 11, 1986) is an American ultramarathon runner and teacher. She is most known for her wins and records in backyard ultra and 6 day race events.

== Running ==
=== Running career ===
After training for her first 5K in 2008 and deciding not to race, Megan returned to running in 2016 when her then-boyfriend, now husband, Joe convinced her to run a half marathon with him. She states that at the end of that half marathon, the thought that "it would be fun to keep going" spurred her to try increasingly long races and events.

Megan ran her first 100 mile race, the Habanero Hundred, in 2018 and finished first overall. Her first backyard ultra was the Saguaro Showdown in 2024, again finishing first overall. Megan's first 6 day race took place later the same year at Six Days in the Dome, once more taking first overall having run just over 526 miles. She has gone on to podium, win outright, and set course and world records at a number of races across the 100 mile, backyard ultra, and 6 day formats.

=== Wins and records ===
==== 6 day races ====
In May 2025, Megan set a new 6 day women's world record running 603.155 miles at the GOMU 6-Day World Championship in Vallon-Pont-d’Arc, France. During this race she also set the women's 500 mile world record and became the first woman to surpass 600 miles in 6 days.

In September 2026, Megan broke her own 6 day women's record by completing 636.482 miles at the GOMU World Championship 6-Day in Balatonfüred, Hungary. During this race, she also surpassed the overall American 6 day record of 606.243 miles set by Joe Fejes in 2015, broke her own record to set a new women's 500 mile world record, and became the first woman to reach 1000 km in a 6 day race.

==== Backyard ultras ====
At the 2024 Big's Backyard Ultra in Bell Buckle, Tennessee, Megan broke the women's backyard ultra record completing 87 loops for a total distance of 362.5 miles. This record stood until the 2025 Big's Backyard Ultra, when Megan beat her own record distance by completing 383.3 miles, but came in second behind Sarah Perry, who completed 395.83 miles to set a new women's backyard ultra record.

== Selected race results ==
Year	Competition	Venue	Position	Distance	Result	Notes
2026	GOMU World Championship 6 day	Balatonfüred, Hungary	1st	636.482 mi		Women's 6 day world record, overall American 6 day record [pending ratification], first woman to reach 1000 km in a 6 day race, women's 500 mile world record, 1st overall
2026	Vermont 100 Endurance Race	West Windsor, VT, USA	1st	100 mi	17:19:56	
2026	Cocodona 250	Black Canyon City, AZ, USA	3rd	250 mi	63:09:07	
2026	Northburn 100	Cromwell, New Zealand	1st	100 mi	24:43:18	2nd overall
2025	Across The Years - 12 hour	Peoria, AZ, USA	1st	81.201 mi		1st overall
2025	Big's Backyard Ultra	Bell Buckle, TN, USA	2nd	383.33 mi		
2025	Habanero Hundred	Cat Spring, TX, USA	1st	100 km	9:43:26	1st overall
2025	Badwater 135	Death Valley, CA, USA	2nd	135 mi	26:24:17	
2025	GOMU World Championship 6 day	Vallon-Pont-d’Arc, France	1st	603.155 mi		Former women's 6 day world record, former women's 500 mile world record, 2nd overall
2025	Antelope Island Buffalo Run	Syracuse, UT, USA	2nd	100 mi	17:35:56	3rd overall
2024	Big's Backyard Ultra	Bell Buckle, TN, USA	1st	362.5 mi		Former women's backyard ultra world record, 2nd overall
2024	Angeles Crest	Altadena, CA, USA	1st	100 mi	22:02:52	
2024	Six Days in the Dome	Milwaukee, WI, USA	1st	523.301 mi		1st overall

== Personal life ==
Megan is married to Joe and lives in Santa Fe, New Mexico, where she works as a middle school math teacher.
