= Frank Hart =

Frank Hart may refer to:

- Frank Hart (politician) (1860–1945), Australian politician
- Frank Hart (athlete) (1857/58–1908), American athlete known for pedestrianism

== See also ==
- Frank Harte (1933–2005), traditional Irish singer, song collector, architect, and lecturer
- Frank Heart (1929–2018), American computer engineer
