= John Bukovsky =

Slovakia-born American prelate

His Excellency John Bukovsky
- Native name: Ján Bukovský / Ján Fukna
- Church: Roman Catholic

Orders
- Ordination: 3 December 1950
- Consecration: 13 October 1990 by Agostino Casaroli

Personal details
- Born: January 18, 1924 Cerová, Czechoslovakia
- Died: December 18, 2010 (aged 86) Techny, Illinois, United States
- Motto: Verbum nuntiare pacis
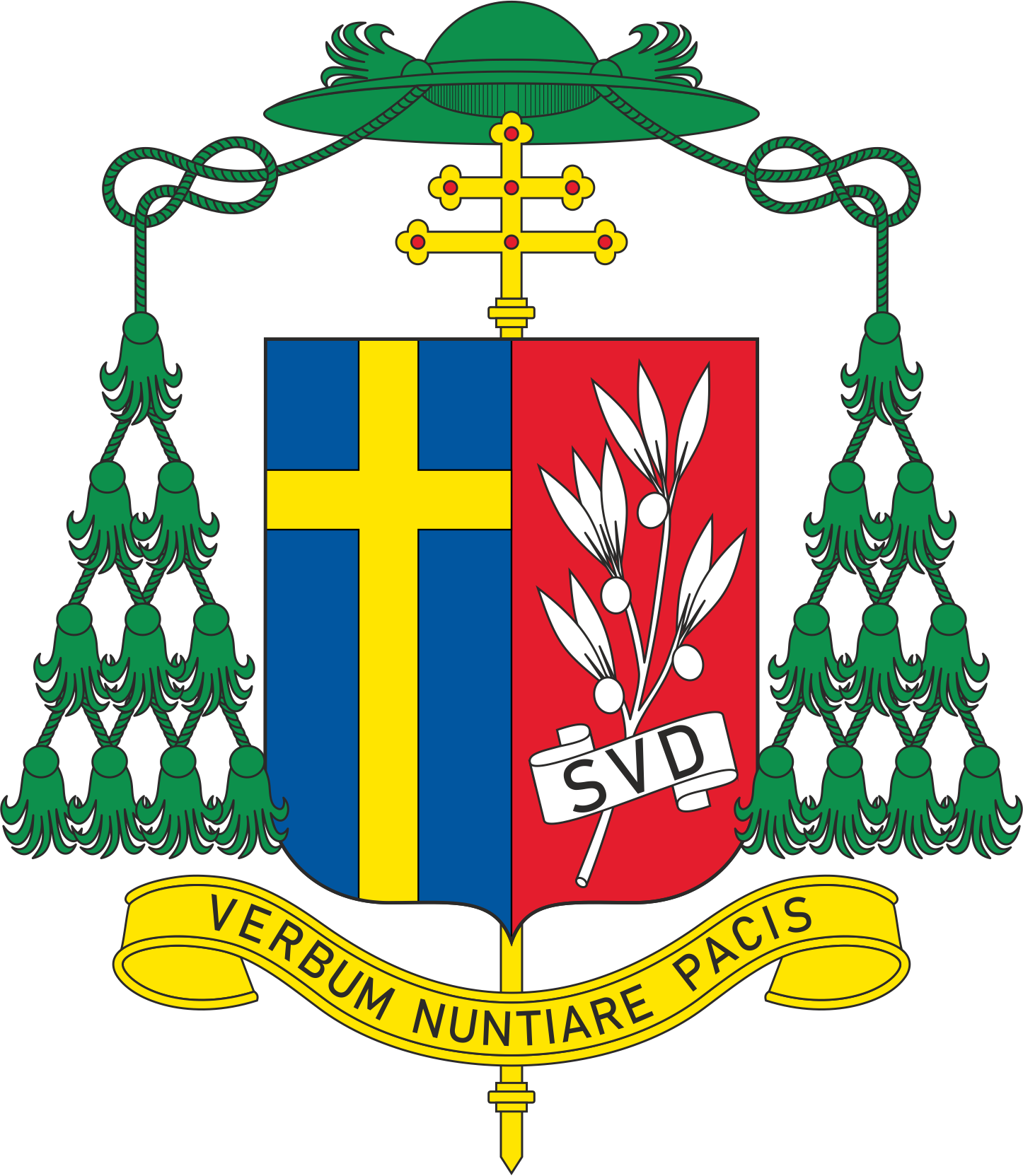
- Coat of arms

John Bukovsky (Slovak: Ján Bukovský), SVD, named Ján Fukna at birth (18 January 1924 – 18 December 2010), was a Slovakia-born American prelate of the Catholic Church who worked in the diplomatic service of the Holy See.

== Biography ==
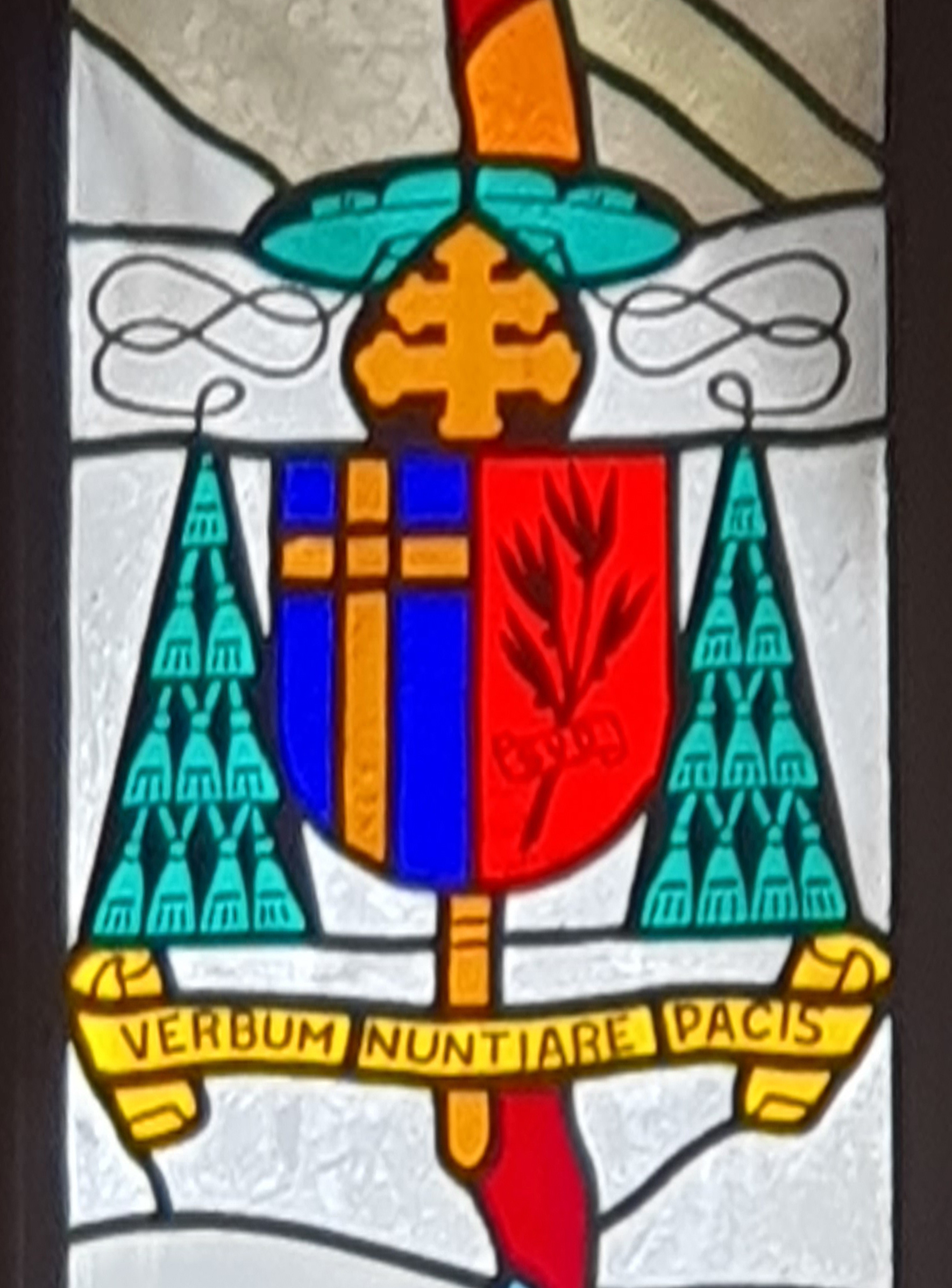
Ecclesiastical coat of arms of John Bukovsky in the stained glass window of the Moscow Cathedral

Bukovsky was born in Cerová, Czechoslovakia, on 18 January 1924, the fourth of six children. He entered the Society of the Divine Word seminary in Nitra, Czechoslovakia, in 1939. The Society sent him to the United States for additional studies in 1947. Ordered to return to Czechoslovakia when the new Communist government revoked his passport, he instead with the help of Chicago Mayor Richard J. Daley reentered the U.S. from Canada as a legal immigrant. He was ordained in December 1950 in Techny, Illinois, as a priest of the Divine Word Missionaries and became a U.S. citizen a few years later. In 1952 he received a degree in sacred theology from Catholic University. He then pursued an academic career, teaching at St. Mary's Seminary in Techny for 14 years and studying at the University of Chicago's Oriental Institute and earning a degree from the Pontifical Biblical Institute in Rome in 1966.

In the 1970s, while Bukovsky served a six-year term in the office of the General Council of the Society of the Divine Word, an elected position, Cardinal Agostino Casaroli recruited him to join the Secretariat of State. While working there Bukovsky frequently lunched with the pope. He was also named to the Curia's Council for Public Affairs and made several trips to explore relations between the Holy See and the countries of Eastern Europe. For 17 years he headed the Secretariat's Eastern Europe desk.

On 18 August 1990, Pope John Paul II named him titular archbishop of Tabalta and Apostolic Nuncio to Romania. He was the first Nuncio to Romania of the post-Communist era.

On 20 December 1994, he was appointed the first papal representative to the Russian Federation. Bukovsky had some significant successes there, regaining partial control of the former seminary in St. Petersburg.

Bukovsky retired upon the appointment of his successor, Giorgio Zur on 29 January 2000. Pope John Paul named him a member of the Pontifical Council for Promoting Christian Unity and a consultor to the Secretariat of State on 6 June 2002.

He died in Techny, Illinois, on 18 December 2010.

== Writings ==
- Spomienky spoločníka. Nitra : Spoločnosť krásneho slova, 2006. ISBN 8085223767. S. 146.
- Chiesa del martirio, chiesa della diplomazia. : Memorie tra Cecoslovacchia e Vaticano. Bologna: EDB, 2009. ISBN 978-8810140499. S. 104.
