= Mittleman =

Mittleman is a surname. Notable people with the surname include:

- Alan Mittleman (born 1953), American theologian
- Harry Mittleman (1900–1985), American building contractor, apartment owner, and real estate developer
- Rick Mittleman (1930–2014), American screenwriter
- Stu Mittleman, ultradistance running champion, fitness/running coach, and author
