= Kaneenika Janakova =

Kaneenika Janakova (born as Tereza Janáková, 1970) is an ultra-distance runner and comes from Cerová near Senica, Slovakia. She has lived in New York for ten years. Janakova is a disciple of Sri Chinmoy. Because of him, she adopted the name Kaneenika which is a Sanskrit word meaning "vision beauty of the inner eye".

== Biography ==
In primary school, she didn't run very well, but when she went to high school during socialism she got a gold badge. Her first marathon in 1996 wasn't her best performance, it took her 4 hours and 45 minutes. At the Košický marathon, she was getting better with a time of 4:05. Then she dared to go for longer runs. Between the years 1998 and 2014 she ran 6, 12, 24 and 48-hour races. In 2001, she tried 6-day races for the first time. Later she added a 700-mile race, a 1000-mile race and 10-day races. In 2015, she entered her first 3100-mile race run which lasted 52 days.

“Many ultra or multiday runners are very humble and simple people. ”

— Kaneenika Janakova

== Races and results ==
- Between 2001 and 2006 she completed four 6-day races. Include 713 km for 6 days, 1,170 km for 10 days, 1,000 miles in 15 days, 19 hours. All three mark Slovak national records.
- Top Ten Ranking List 2010 10 day Race, 1st
- World Ranking 48 h women 2011, ninth
- World Ranking 6 days women 2014, fourth
- 2017 Self-Transcendence 3100 Mile Race, 1st, World Record
