= 3100: Run and Become =

- Film poster
- Directed by: Sanjay Rawal
- Produced by: Tanya Meillier, Alexander Meillier, Sanjay Rawal
- Edited by: Alexander Meillier
- Music by: Michael A. Levine
- Release date: June 1, 2018
- Running time: 79 minutes
- Country: United States
- Language: English

3100: Run and Become is a documentary about why people run, with portraits of runners and what motivates them. It was directed by Sanjay Rawal.

== Synopsis ==
The plot centers on the 3100-mile race in New York City, and also follows Ashprihanal Aalto, a Finnish courier, and Shamita, an Austrian cellist. The film captures the esoteric, spiritual side of running. The film features such diverse locales as New York, to places around the world where ancient cultures have held running sacred, such as the forests of Finland, mountains of Japan, the Kalahari Desert in Africa and the Navajo Nation Reservation in Arizona. It also features the stories of three other runners–Shaun Martin, a Navajo runner and Board Member of Wings of America, Gaolo of the San Bushmen of the Kalahari, and Gyoman-san of the Monks of Mt. Hiei, Japan.

== Awards ==
- Winner, Director’s Choice – Illuminate Film Festival

== Song ==
Roberta Flack and the films composer Michael A. Levine contributed the song Running. The song appears on the soundtrack for the documentary.
