= Vasu Duzhiy =

Russian ultramarathon runner

Vasu Duzhiy (Russian: Васу Дужий, born Nikolai Duzhiy, 1965) is an ultra-distance runner from St. Petersburg, Russia. Duzhiy is a disciple of Sri Chinmoy and adopted the name Vasu from him. He works as a foreman for a lumber company.

== Races and Results ==
- 2018 winner from the Self-Transcendence 3100 Mile Race
- 2017 winner from the Self-Transcendence 3100 Mile Race
- 2013 winner from the Self-Transcendence 3100 Mile Race
- 2012 second on the Self-Transcendence 10 Day Race
