= Louise Armaindo =

Female 19th century athlete

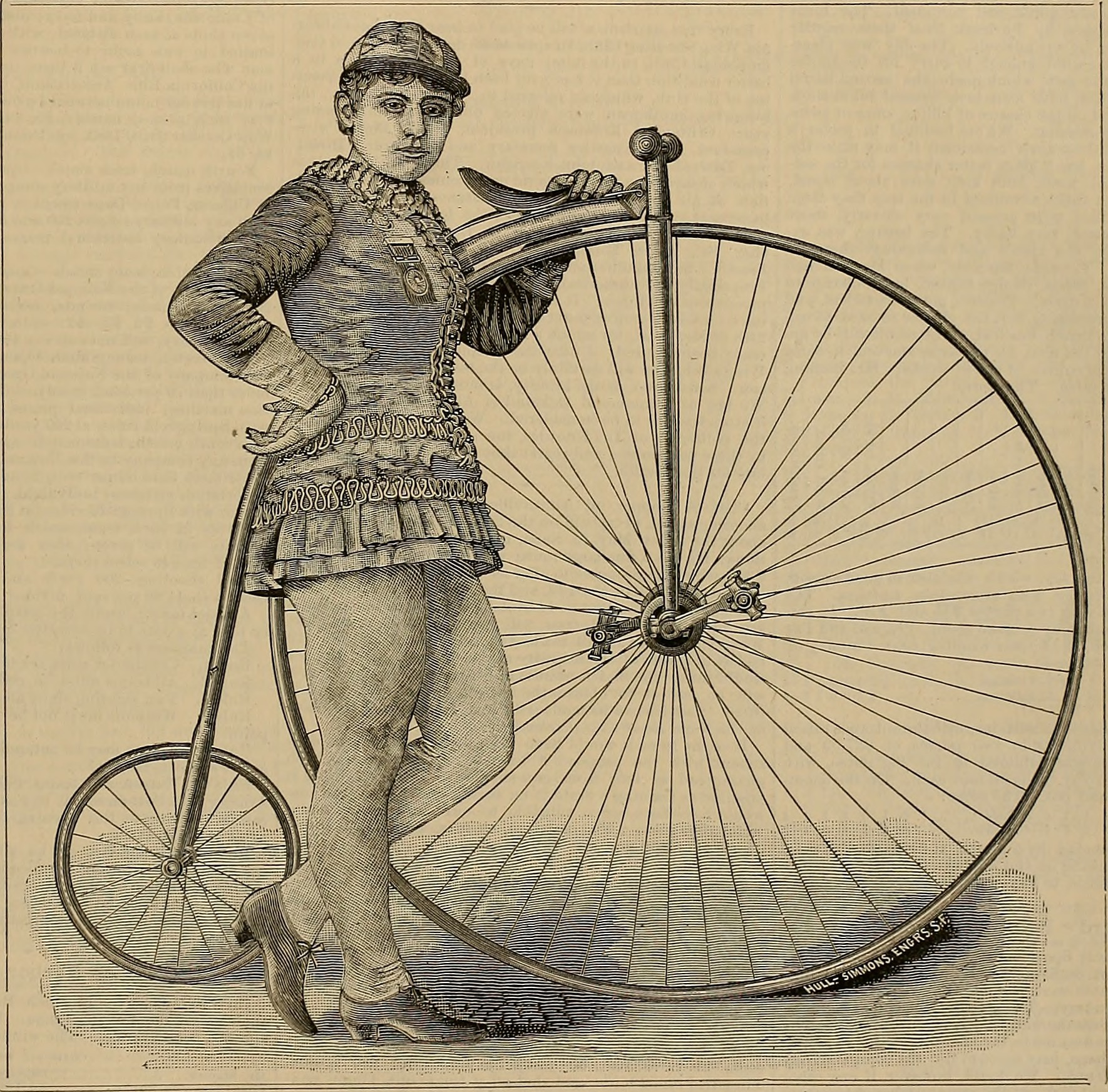
- Born: Louise or Louisa Brisebois or Brisbois; 1861
- Died: 1900 (aged 38–39)
- Occupation(s): strongwoman, trapeze artist, competitive walker, and high-wheel cyclist

Louise Armaindo, born either Louise or Louisa Brisebois or Brisbois (1861–1900), was a Canadian strongwoman, trapeze artist, competitive walker, and high-wheel cyclist. Throughout the last decades of the 19th century, she was known as "the champion female bicycle rider of the world."

== Life and career ==
Louise Armaindo was born Louise or Louisa Brisebois or Brisbois in 1861 in a small community near Montreal, Canada East.

Armaindo was trained by Canadian athlete Tom Eck, who also worked as her manager and promoter and eventually became her husband. The two met in Chicago in the late 1870s, when Armaindo was performing as a strongwoman and becoming interested in pedestrianism, competitive endurance walking.^{: 29-31} With Eck as manager, Armaindo became a pedestrienne, competing and giving exhibitions in small American towns for pay.^{: 15}

Around this time, many pedestriennes began to race high-wheel bicycles, including Armaindo.^{: 15} She soon became a successful bicycle racer, competing against men, women, and horses.

In 1882, Armaindo raced American cyclist John Prince over 50 miles. She was given a five-mile head start, but the two eventually became so close in the race that they traded positions several times. Prince won by about a minute. Armaindo was more successful when she raced Elsa von Blumen that same year. She won their championship race in Ridgeway Park, Philadelphia, becoming the women's champion of cycling.

Armaindo was also known for participating in multi-day indoor cycling races, in which cyclists would ride many hours each day, with the winner determined by who logged the most miles over the entirety of the race. In 1886, she held a record of 843 miles in a race of this kind.

Armaindo died in 1900. By the late 1930s, she was almost entirely forgotten by sports historians.^{: 4}
