= Divine Word College =

Catholic seminary in Epworth, Iowa, US

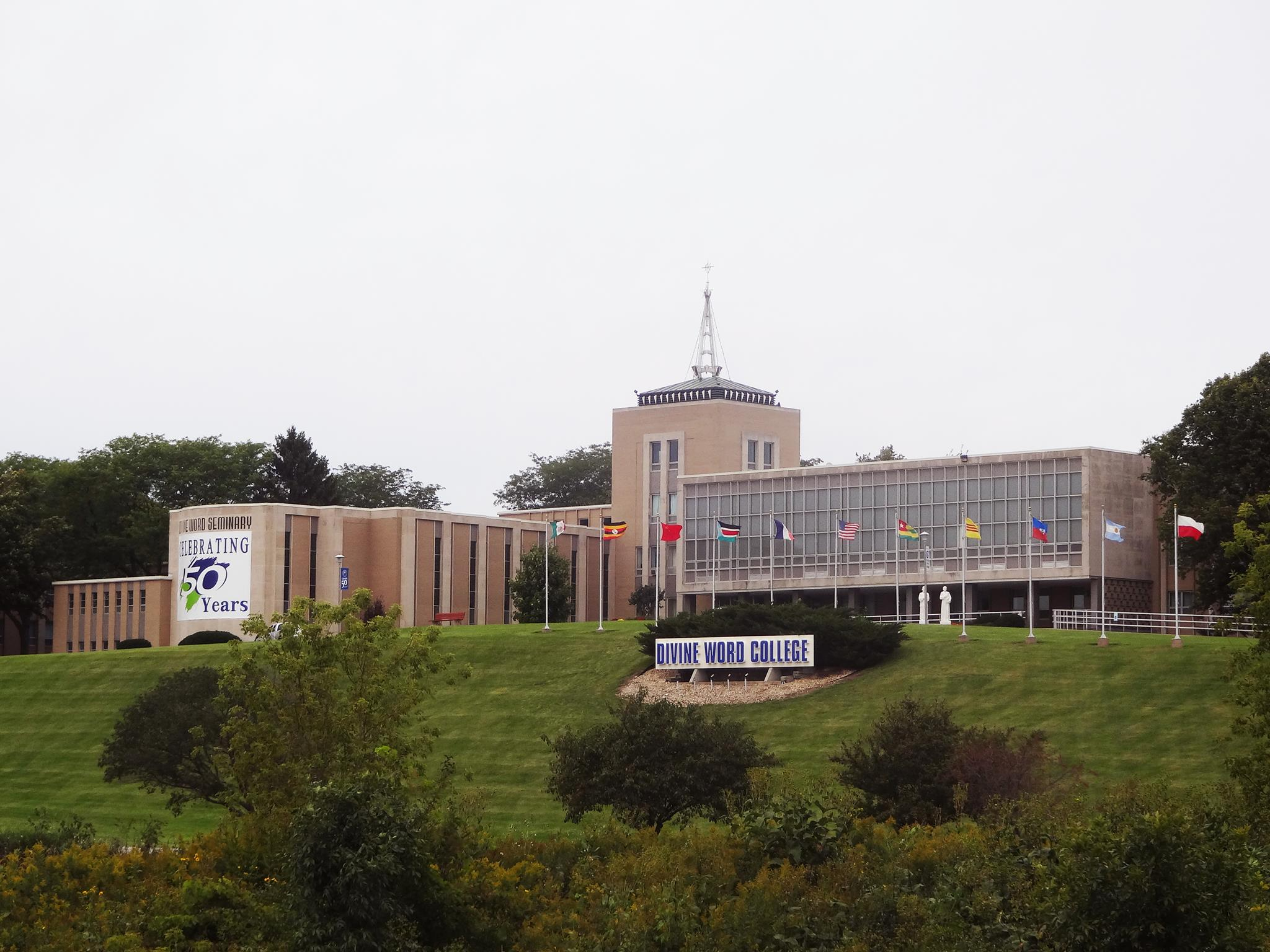
- Former names: St. Mary's Seminary (1909–1932); St. Paul's Mission House (1932–1960)
- Type: Private seminary
- Established: 1964; 62 years ago
- Founder: Society of the Divine Word
- Accreditation: Higher Learning Commission
- Religious affiliation: Catholic Church (Divine Word Missionaries)
- Academic affiliations: AACU; ACE; CIC; NACS; NAICU
- President: Thomas Ascheman
- Location: Epworth, Iowa, United States; 42.44°N 90.93°W
- Website: www.dwci.edu

Divine Word College is a private undergraduate Roman Catholic seminary in Epworth, Iowa, United States. Founded in 1964, It educates students for missionary service in the Catholic Church as priests, brothers, sisters, and laypersons. It is owned and operated by the Society of the Divine Word (SVD).

== History ==
Founded in 1875 in Steyl, the Netherlands, the Society of the Divine Word (SVD) sent the first Divine Word Missionary, Joseph Freinademetz to China by 1879. In 1895, Wendelin Meyer went to America. By 1909, the society had established the first seminary in the United States with the mission of training priest and brother candidates for service in foreign missions. The Society of the Divine Word originally established a Divine Word Seminary in 1912 at Techny, Illinois. In 1931, the society purchased property in Epworth, Iowa, where it established St. Paul's Mission House, an SVD high school seminary. In 1964, Divine Word College replaced the high school seminary and has since served as the principal site of SVD undergraduate seminary education in the United States.

== Student life ==
During their final semester of undergraduate studies at Divine Word College, young men who choose to continue with the SVD may apply for the Society's one-year novitiate program at the Chicago Province Headquarters in Techny, Illinois. These men may then apply to profess first vows as members of the Society near the end of the novitiate program and continue with seminary studies at the Chicago Theologate.
