= Beckjord =

Beckjord is a surname of Scandinavian origins (mostly found in Norway). Notable people with the surname include:

- Jon-Erik Beckjord (1939–2008), American proponent of paranormal beliefs
- Suprabha Beckjord (born 1956), American ultramarathon runner
