= Antibes 6 Day Race =

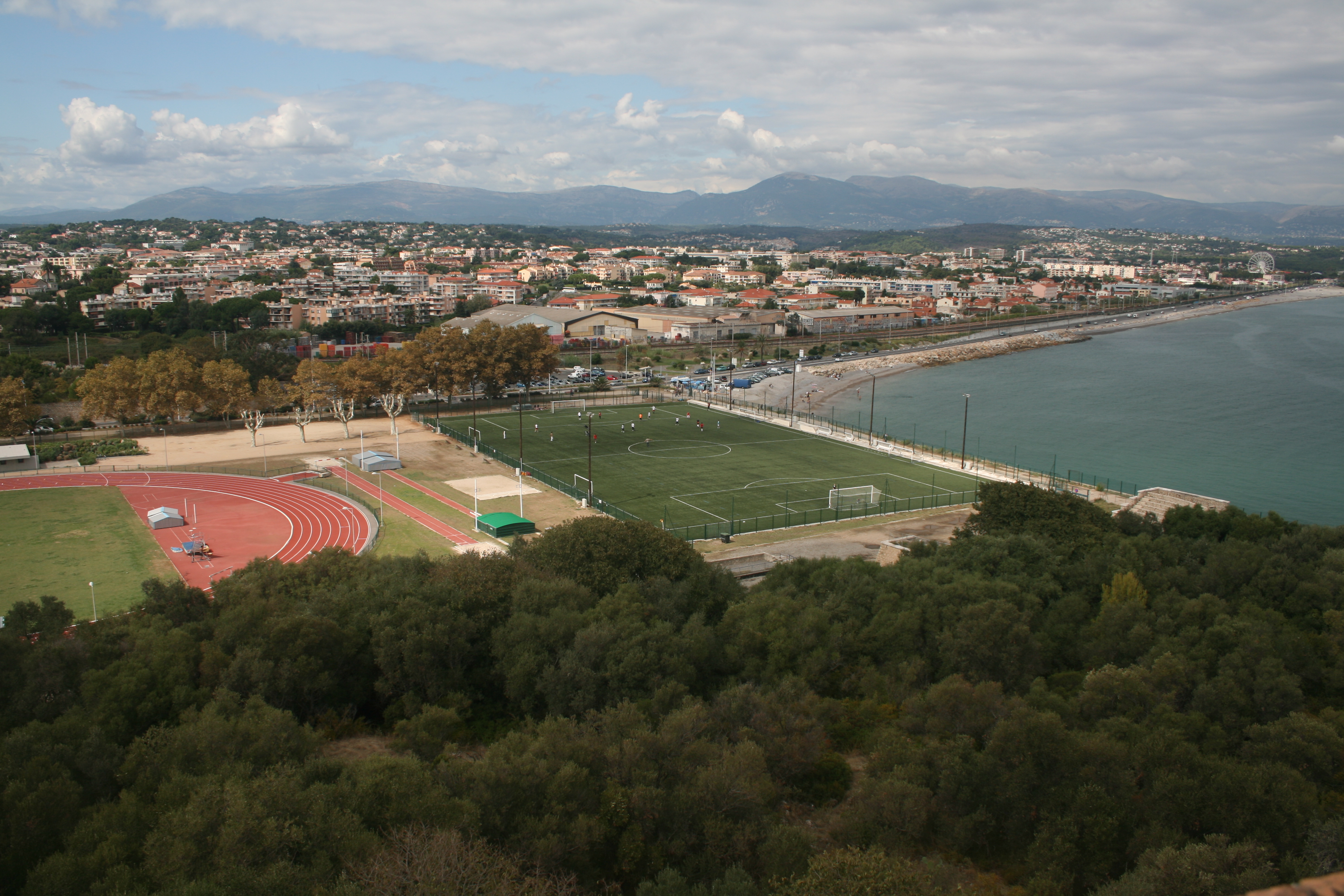

The Antibes 6 day race (6 Jours d'Antibes) was a multiday race that is now called the 6 Jours de France which took place in Antibes starting in 2009 in Juan-les-Pins in the South of France. Consisting of 24h (not done in 2011), 48h and 72h ultramarathon events along with the 6 day, this and the Trans-Gaule are the two most significant multiday races taking place in France today. Currently the event takes place in Vallon-Pont-d'Arc, in Southern France and includes a 48 hour and a 24 hour within the 6 day main event.

== Winners 2011 (walking division) ==
M Dominique Naumowicz France 665,225 km
W Nicoletta Mizera Italy 616,025 km (5–11 June)
