= Athens International Ultramarathon Festival =

The Athens International Ultramarathon Festival is a Multiday race which takes place at the former Ellinikon International Airport in Greece.

== Events ==
The first Athens International Ultramarathon Festival (UF) was organized by Dr Costas Baxevanis in 2005 in Loutraki, located approximately 80 km from Athens. The first event was a 24hr race which took place in the Loutraki Stadium. Edit Berces won that first race with 211 K.

- In 2006 the event also took place in Loutraki, but this time in a sport camp because of damage due to an earthquake. This second event in 2006 could be characterized as an Ultra Festival because besides the 24hr race, there were 6-hour, 12-hour and a 7-day race. The 24hr race was won by Valmir Nunes whereas Vlastimil Dvoracek was the winner of the 7-day race.
- In 2007 the event took place in Athens, in the former Ellinikon International Airport. Wolfgang Schwerk participated for the first time in the UF and set a World Record in the 48hr split (420K) of the 7-day race which he won with 1012K.
- In 2008 Schwerk again won the 7-day race.
- 2009 was when the 48hr and 72hr races were included for the first time followed by the 1000 mile race in 2010 (actually, no such multiday events had taken place in Europe until that time point) which was won again by Wolfgang Schwerk who has set many World Age Records and National Records throughout his participation in the Ultramarathon Festival.
- In the 2010, Ryochi Sekiya won the 24hr race performing 250K.
- In 2011, Dr Baxevanis introduced the 1000K race (also for the first time in Europe) which was won by Trond Sjavic. In that event Mami Kudo set a World Record in the 48hr race with 368.687K and Sumi Inagaki won the 24hr race running 230.4K
- The 7th Athens International Ultramarathon Festival 2012 took place between March 19 and April 4 at the former Ellinikon International Airport. In the 7th Ultramarathon Festival included both the 1000 mile and 1000 km races in addition to the 24hr, 48hr, 72hr, and 7-day events. In the 1000 mile race participated 3 runners (Martina Hausmann, Abichal Sherrington, Nikitas Nomikos). Only one finisher – the Greek multiday specialist Nikitas Nomikos ( 15d 22h 41m 36s) who became the first Greek runner ever to have completed the 1000 mile race in Athens International Ultramarathon Festival within the 16-day time limit.

== Organizers ==
In 2005 the Ultramarathon Festival was supported by the Apollon Athletic Club, and thereafter for the next 3 events by the Athens Alpine Club. In 2009, Dr Baxevanis founded the Association of Greek Dayrunners to act as the main and official organizing club for the Ultramarathon Festivals.

== Resources ==
- William Sichel at the Athens 1000 mile World Cup 2010
- Dream and reality of an epic race Martina Haussman
