= Grahak Cunningham =

Australian runner and motivational speaker

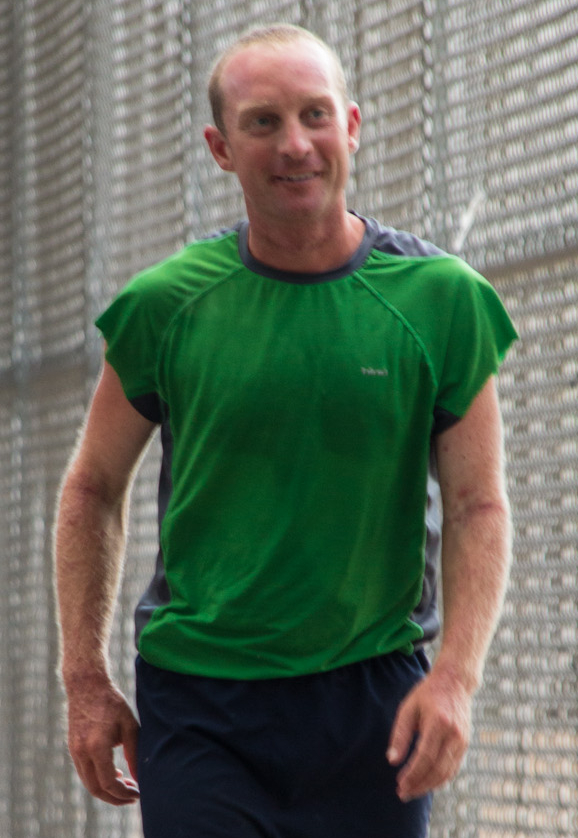
2012

Grahak Cunningham (born Stuart Cunningham, 21 May 1977) is an ultra-distance runner and motivational speaker from Perth, Western Australia.

== Biography ==
Cunningham grew up in Busselton, south of Perth, he did very little running. It was only when he was about 16 and stressed with school exams that his mother took him along to a meditation class. At university, he began attending classes at a Sri Chinmoy center. He adopted the name Grahak from Sri Chinmoy (a Sanskrit word meaning "eagerness"). Already running marathons and longer distances and getting ever more deeply involved in Chinmoy's teachings, Cunningham first witnessed the New York race in 2003.

== Races and results ==
- 2007 Bunbury 50 km Ultramarathon, 5th
- 2008 Bunbury 50 km Ultramarathon, 9th
- 2009 Self-Transcendence 3100-Mile Race, 2nd
- 2012 Bunbury 50 km Ultramarathon, 2nd
- 2012 Self-Transcendence 3100 Mile Race, 1st
