= Surasa Mairer =

Surasa Mairer (born Paula Mairer, March 6, 1959, in St. Justina, Austria) is an ultra-distance runner. She works as a secretary and lives in Vienna. Surasa is a devotee of the spiritual master Sri Chinmoy.

== Biography ==
She started running in 1987 at the age of 28 years. Previously, she had not done any sports. "Since then I try the teaching of integral Yoga. A part of this teaching is sporty fitness." In September 1996, 1997, and 2002, she completed the Sri Chinmoy Ultra Trio 700 mile race (1126 km).

== Wins and records ==
- 1999 and 2000 winner of the 1,000-mile-run (1600 km)
- 2000–2003 winner of the Sri Chinmoy Ultra Trio 1000-Mile Race
- 2007 winner of the 10-day run in New York
- 2011 world records in the reverse running of the distances of 5 km, 10 km, half-marathon and marathon
- 2011, 2013, 2015 and 2018 winner of the Self-Transcendence 3100 Mile Race.

World Records over 1000 km, 700 miles and 1300 miles.
