= Elsa von Blumen =

American cyclist

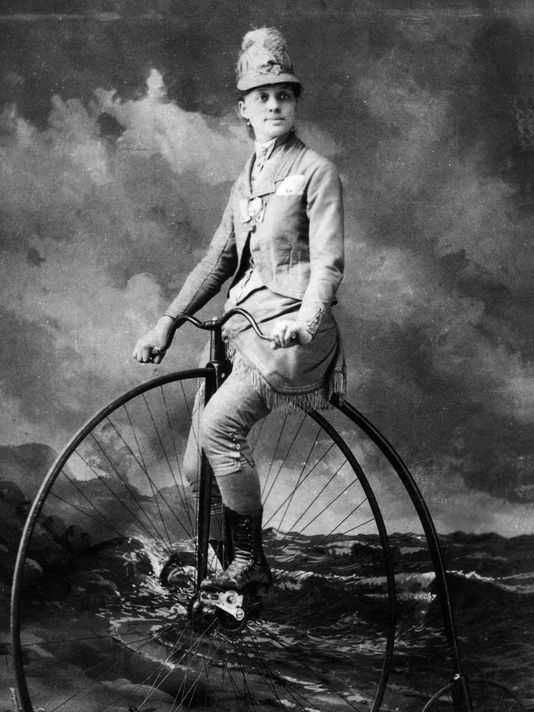

Personal information
- Full name: Caroline Roosevelt
- Citizenship: American
- Born: October 6, 1865 New York state
- Died: June 3, 1935 (aged 69)

Sport
- Sport: Pedestrianism; Cycling

Elsa von Blumen (6 October 1865 – 3 June 1935), real name Caroline Roosevelt, was an early American female cyclist in the late 19th century.

Elsa von Blumen grew up in New York state. She was diagnosed with consumption and started walking for exercise to treat her poor health. After discovering her remarkable endurance she began her athletic career as a pedestrian in 1879, travelling from one pedestrian venue to the next to earn money by walking. She would walk 100 miles in under 27 hours, usually indoors in an opera house or music hall.

She then transitioned into bike races when, in 1881, she raced against a horse in Rochester, New York. In the same year she rode 1000 miles in one 6 day long event in Pittsburgh. In 1882, von Blumen was known as the women's cycling champion. She raced Louise Armaindo in July 1882 in Philadelphia; Armaindo won, taking over the women's championship title.

In 1886, she won a race against two men who were competing together relay style.
