= Cerová =

- Municipality
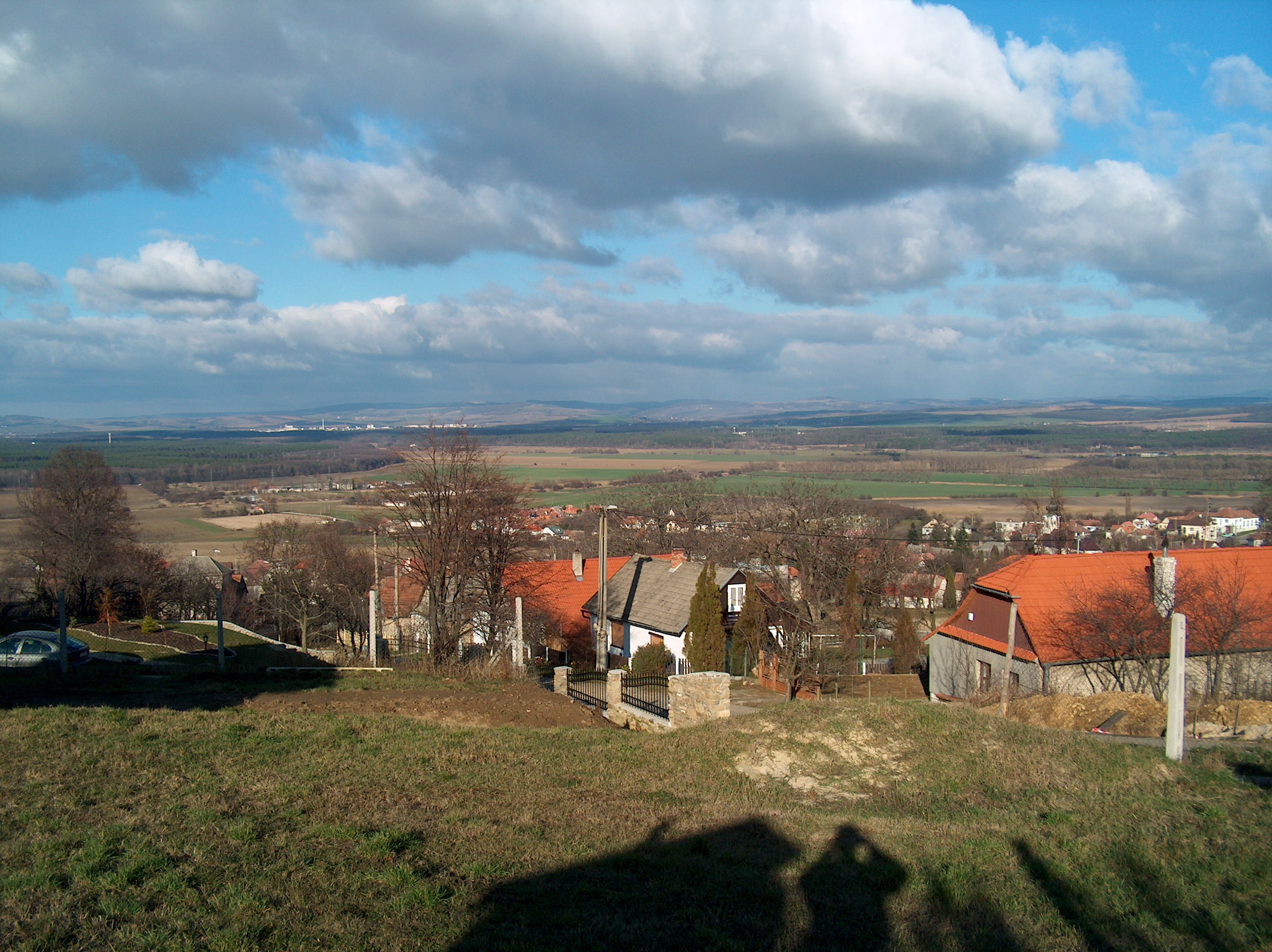

- Flag

- Location of Cerová in the Trnava Region Location of Cerová in Slovakia
- Coordinates: 48.59°N 17.38°E
- Country: Slovakia
- Region: Trnava Region
- District: Senica District
- First mentioned: 1696

Area
  - Total: 21.95 km^{2} (8.47 sq mi)
- Elevation: 303 m (994 ft)

Population (2025)
  - Total: 1,085
- Time zone: UTC+1 (CET)
  - Summer (DST): UTC+2 (CEST)
- Postal code: 906 33
- Area code: +421 34
- Vehicle registration plate (until 2022): SE
- Website: www.obeccerova.sk

Cerová (Hungarian: Korlátkő) is a village and municipality in Senica District in the Trnava Region of western Slovakia. The village is divided into three parts: Cerová (Hungarian: Czerova), Lieskové (Hungarian: Lészkó), and Rozbehy (Hungarian: Korlátfalva).

== History ==
It was first mentioned in 1324 as Korlathkeu.

== Geography ==
The municipality lies at an altitude of 303 metres (994 ft) and covers an area of 21.95 km^{2} (8.47 sq mi) (2025).

== Population ==
Population statistic (10 years)
Year	1995	2005	2015	2025
Count	1362	1241	1176	1085
Difference		−8.88%	−5.23%	−7.73%

Population statistic
Year	2024	2025
Count	1095	1085
Difference		−0.91%

It has a population of 1085 people (31 December 2025).

=== Ethnicity ===
Census 2021 (1+ %)
Ethnicity	Number	Fraction
Slovak	1071	96.92%
Not found out	27	2.44%
Total	1105	

In year 2021 was 1105 people by ethnicity 1071 as Slovak, 27 as Not found out, 7 as Other, 6 as Czech, 2 as Romani, 2 as Polish, 1 as Italian, 1 as Rusyn, 1 as Romanian and 1 as Hungarian.

Note on population: The difference values of population numbers in the table "Population statistic" and in the sections "Ethnicity" & "Religion" is caused by the use of various statistical methods.

=== Religion ===
Census 2021 (1+ %)
Religion	Number	Fraction
Roman Catholic Church	785	71.04%
None	233	21.09%
Evangelical Church	30	2.71%
Not found out	24	2.17%
Total	1105	

In year 2021 was 1105 people by religion 785 from Roman Catholic Church, 233 from None, 30 from Evangelical Church, 24 from Not found out, 7 from Christian Congregations in Slovakia, 6 from Other and not ascertained christian church, 5 from Greek Catholic Church, 5 from Ad hoc movements, 4 from Other, 3 from Calvinist Church, 1 from Jehovah's Witnesses, 1 from Islam and 1 from United Methodist Church.

== Genealogical resources ==
The records for genealogical research are available at the state archive "Statny Archiv in Bratislava, Slovakia"

- Roman Catholic church records (births/marriages/deaths): 1692-1902 (parish A)

== Notable people ==
- Kaneenika Janakova (born 1970), ultra-distance runner
- John Bukovsky (1924–2010), Roman Catholic prelate

== See also ==
- List of municipalities and towns in Slovakia
