= UltraCentric =

The UltraCentric 24-Hour Run in Grapevine, Texas hosted the American Ultrarunning Association's 2006 National 24-Hour Run Championship on a certified, 2.4-mile road loop on November 18, 2006. This annual event offered a $12,000 prize purse in 2006, the largest in ultramarathon national championship history in the United States. The event served as the selection race for the National Team to the 2007 World 24-Hour, which was held in Drummondville, Quebec, Canada in July 2007. The entire $12,000 prize purse was reserved and earmarked only for Americans who qualify for and participate in the 2007 World 24-Hour as a member of the US National Team.

The 24-Hour National Championship was included in a weekend-long "celebration of ultrarunning," including 6-hour, 12-hour, and 48-hour events. [Move www.americanultra.org to an External links section]

This multi-day event comprises ultramarathon, 24-hour race and a 48-hour race.
