= Charles Rowell =

English athlete (1852–1909)

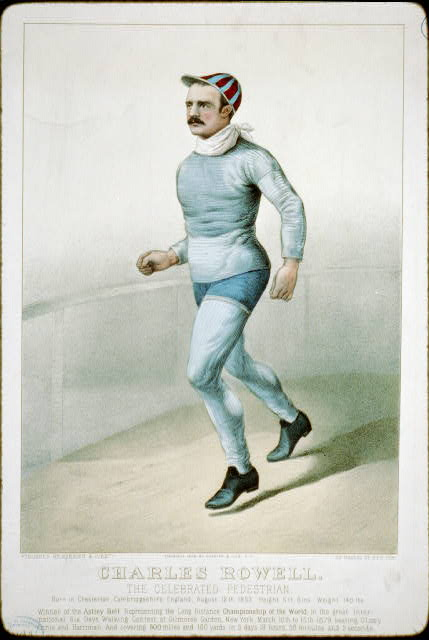
Charles Rowell, 1879

Charles Rowell (1852–1909) was an English athlete: a famous runner and celebrated exponent of the sport of pedestrianism race-walking.

== Life ==
Rowell was born in Chesterton, Cambridge in 1852, and was sometimes known as The Cambridge Wonder. He was initially hired as a pacemaker for champion Edward Payson Weston, but went on to have his own career. He was particularly successful in the 6 Day Race of the "go-as-you-please" style where competitors could walk and/or run as they wished, and which featured as an annual competition between the US and UK from 1874 to 1888. Interesting article, courtesy of The Cambridge Museum, Castle Street, Cambridge. https://capturingcambridge.org/museum-of-cambridge/museum-exhibit-stories/maypole-paul-pry/ He died in August 1909.

== Achievements ==
In 1877 a trophy and substantial prize was created by Sir John Dugdale Astley, the Astley belt, for the greatest distance on an indoor track over 144 hours. Rowell won this twice in 1879, and then retired from the event to concentrate on contests of 12 hours per day for 6 days. The first time he covered 500 miles, the second 530 miles despite illness which meant he had to withdraw for eleven hours, but caught up with and overtook the others. In 1882 he set new world records for 100 miles (13:26), 24 Hours (150 miles) and 48 hours (258 miles/415 km), and 300 miles in 58:17:06 (a record which still stands today).
