= Ashprihanal Pekka Aalto =

Finnish ultramarathon runner

Personal information
- Nationality: Finnish
- Born: Pekka Aalto; 27 August 1970 (age 55)

Sport
- Country: Finland
- Sport: Ultramarathon
- Event: 3100 miles run
- Club: Sri Chinmoy Marathon Team

Achievements and titles
- Personal best: 40 days 09:06:21 (2015)

Ashprihanal Pekka Aalto (born August 27, 1970) is a Finnish ultramarathon runner who began running as a hobby at age 25. He currently works as a courier. Aalto is a member of The Sri Chinmoy Marathon Team. In 2006, Tarja Halonen, the President of Finland, recognized him as an "International Ambassador of Sport".

== History ==
In 1999, he started running multi-day races. He ranked all-time second at the 3100-mile Race in 2006. On October 29, 2006, Aalto finished the San Francisco One Day 24 hour endurance race in first place, logging just over 125 miles (201 km) in a 24-hour period. Aalto is a three-time champion of The Self-Transcendence Six Day Race in New York City. For three straight years he ran all three yearly Self-Transcendence multidays in New York (six days, 3,100 miles (5,000 km), 700 miles).

He won the world's longest certified footrace, the Self-Transcendence 3100 Mile Race nine times, finishing the 2015 race at record time 40 days 09:06:21 for a daily average of 76.776 miles (123.559 km).

== Races ==
Races
Year	Races	Distance (Miles)	Time (days, hours, minutes, seconds)	Placing
1999	Sri Chinmoy Ultra Trio 700-Mile Race	700	09:09:10:40	1.
2000	Sri Chinmoy Ultra Trio 700-Mile Race	700	09:09:44:59	1.
2000	Self-Transcendence 10 Day Race	669	10:00:00:00	2.
2000	Self-Transcendence 3100-Mile Race	3100	47:13:29:55	1.
2001	Self-Transcendence 10 Day Race	349	10:00:00:00	—
2001	Sri Chinmoy Ultra Trio 700-Mile Race	700	09:20:32:29	1.
2001	Self-Transcendence 3100-Mile Race	3100	48:10:56:12	1.
2002	Self-Transcendence 6 Day Race	422	06:00:00:00	1.
2002	Self-Transcendence 3100-Mile Race	3100	46:13:27:51	2.
2003	Self-Transcendence 6 Day Race	457	06:00:00:00	1.
2004	Self-Transcendence 6 Day Race	433	06:00:00:00	1.
2004	Self-Transcendence 3100-Mile Race	3100	46:06:55:11	1.
2005	Self-Transcendence 3100-Mile Race	3100	49:10:28:49	2.
2006	Self-Transcendence 3100-Mile Race	3100	43:15:49:33	2.
2007	Self-Transcendence 3100-Mile Race	3100	43:04:26:32	1.
2008	Self-Transcendence 3100-Mile Race	3100	44:02:42:15	1.
2009	Self-Transcendence 3100-Mile Race	3100	43:16:28:06	1.
2010	Self-Transcendence 3100-Mile Race	3100	46:07:37:24	1.
2011	Self-Transcendence 6 Day Race	467	06:00:00:00	2.
2011	Self-Transcendence 3100-Mile Race	3100	46:07:37:24	3.
2012	Self-Transcendence 6 Day Race	470	06:00:00:00	2.
2013	Self-Transcendence 3100-Mile Race	3100	48:16:14:33	3.
2014	Self-Transcendence 10 Day Race	833	10:00:00:00	1.
2015	Self-Transcendence 3100-Mile Race	3100	40:09:06:21	1.
2016	Self-Transcendence 3100-Mile Race	3100	46:02:54:22	2.
2019	Self-Transcendence 3100-Mile Race	3100	47:01:39:34	1.
