= Dipali Cunningham =

Australian ultramarathon runner

Dipali Cunningham (born August 27, 1958) from Melbourne, Australia now she lives in New York City, USA is an ultramarathon woman runner. Dipali is a Disciple of the spiritual Master Sri Chinmoy over 30 years.

== History ==
She began multiday running in 1991 with the Sri Chinmoy 7 Day race in Flushing Meadow, Queens, New York.

== Records ==
Cunningham won the Self-Transcendence 6 Day Race every year between 1998-2015. In 2001, she set the 6 Day Road World Best of 821.862 km.

- 1993 1000-Mile Race -First Place (Australian record) - 15days+12:52:02
- 1997 1000 Mile Race-First Place (Australian record) - 13days+20:18:40
- 1998 women's world best on the road for six days with 504 miles.
- 2001 women's world record on the road for six days with 510 miles.
- 2004 women's age group 45-49 world best for six days with 479 miles.
- 2009 women's world best on the road for six days with 513 miles.

"I think I am being shown that age is in the mind."

— Dipali Cunningham
