= Trans-Gaule =

The Trans-Gaule is a trans-national ultramarathon the second longest multiday race in France after Le Tour de France Footrace (43days 2776km).It consists of eighteen stages in eighteen consecutive days with a total of 1,150 km, from Roscoff in the English Channel to the Mediterranean. This event is the equivalent to Germany's Deutschlandlauf, the Trans-Europe and the Trans-American Footrace race.

== Requirements ==
- Each stage has to be completed, by foot.
- Time allowed averages 5.5 km/h

== Races ==
- 2001 - Ie édition :1130 km. Winner Maurice Mondon (France) in 96 h 15'46"
- 2002 - IIe édition :1130 km. Winner Rainer Koch (Germany) in 94 h 04'52"
- 2003 - Race not held
- 2004 - IIIe édition :1142 km. Winner Jean-Jacques Moros (France) in 94 h 00'36"
- 2005 - IVe édition :1143 km. Winner Janne Kankaansyrja (Finland) in 98 h 08'52"
- 2006 - Ve édition :1144 km. Winner Werner Selch (Germany) in 109 h 17'41"
- 2007 - VIe édition : 1144 km. Winner Martin Wagen (Swiss) in 103 h 19'42"
- 2008 - VIIe édition : 1146 km. Winner René Strosny (Germany) in 94 h 04'40" (record)
- 2009 - Race not held
- 2010 - VIIIe : Winner Jan Nabuurs (NED)
- 2011 - IXe : 1190 km. Winner Jean-Jacques Moros (FRA); First Woman Carmen Hildebrand (GER) 5th overall.
- 2012 - Race not Held (Trans Europe Race)
- 2013 - Xe: Winner Jean-Jacques Moros (FRA) in 100:42:27; First Woman Carmen Hildebrand (GER) 6th overall.
- 2014 - XIe: Winner Stéphane Pelissier (FRA) 107:19:44; First Woman Carmen Hildebrand (GER) 116:15:15 5th overall.
- 2015 - Race not held (TDF footrace)
- 2016 - XIIe: Winner David Le Broch (FRA) in 105:26:58; First Women Jennifer Bradley (GBR) 8th overall.
- 2017 - Race not held, possibly ended.
