= Wolfgang Schwerk =

German ultramarathon runner

Madhupran Wolfgang Schwerk is an ultra-marathon runner, born 28 July 1955 and now living in Solingen, Germany. He was a trained retail-salesman, baritone opera singer, farmer, carpenter, and poultry breeder before becoming a house-husband in 1984. He has been married to opera singer Cornelia Berger-Schwerk since 1981 and they have one daughter.

He is a highly respected multiday runner and was the 3100 mile World Record holder for nine years until Ashprihanal Aalto broke his record in 2015. Wolfgang also finished the Trans-Australia Race in 2001 (2,900 miles) and placed third in the Lisbon-Moscow race in 2003. In 2002 Schwerk impressed the running world with a tremendous victory in 42 days+13:24:03 (WR).This also established 74 new distance records, from 1400 miles up to 5000 km. His performance was so dominating, averaging 72.8 miles (117.2 km) per day, that he led the world, that year, with the fastest 1000 mile time - a split of 13 days, 5 hours 1.

In the summer of 2006, he broke his own time of 42 days 13:24:03 set in 2002 with a new record of 41 days 08:16:29, averaging 75.111 miles per day.

From 1987 to 2006 Schwerk was also ranked second all time at the 24-hour distance with 171.628 miles.
