= Sandy Barwick =

New Zealand ultramarathon runner

Sandra May Barwick MBE (born 1949) is a New Zealand ultramarathon runner who set a new six-day track world record in Campbelltown, Australia, 18–24 November 1990. Covering 549 miles 110 yards in six days, Barwick set a record that was not broken until Camille Herron covered 560.330 miles in March 2024.

In the 1994 Queen's Birthday Honours, Barwick was appointed a Member of the Order of the British Empire, for services to athletics.

== Career highlights ==
Sandy Barwick set these world records.

- Track: 6 day 883.631 km, Campbelltown, Australia, December 1990
- Road: 1000 km 7 days 16 hour 11 minutes
- 2000 km 17 days 3 hours 1 minute
- 1000 miles 12 days 14 hours 38 minutes 40 sec
- 1300 miles 17 days 22 hours 46 minutes 07 sec
- (All road records were set at the Sri Chinmoy 1300 mile multiday race in New York, 16 September – 3 October 1991.)
