= Frank Hart (athlete) =

African-American athlete (1856–1908)

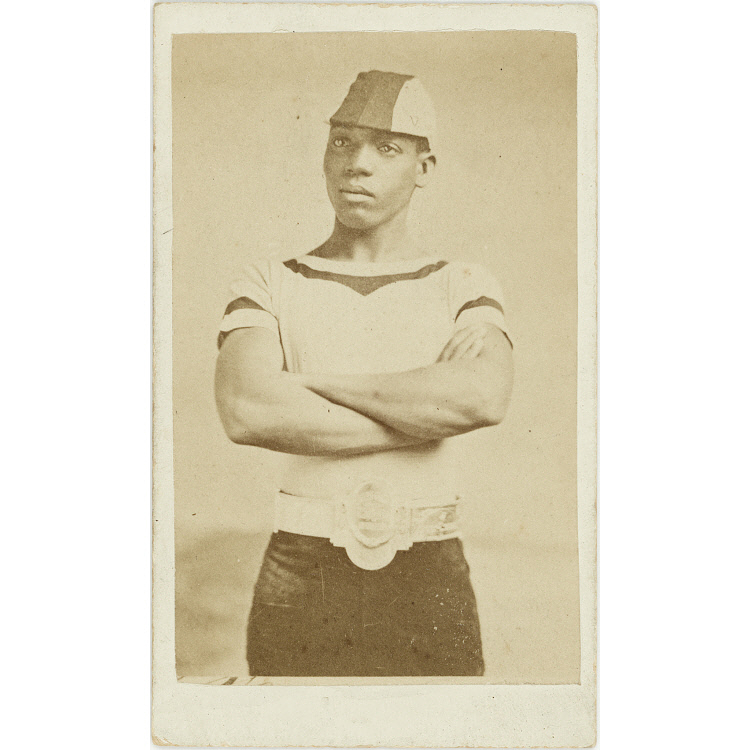
- Hart circa 1880

Personal information
- Nicknames: Black Dan, The Negro Wonder
- Born: Fred Hichborn; 1856 Haiti
- Died: September 1908 (aged 52) Chicago, Illinois, U.S.

Sport
- Country: USA
- Sport: Pedestrianism, Baseball

Frank Hart (1856 – September 1908) was an American athlete famous as the first African-American world record holder in the 19th century sport of pedestrianism. His most noted win was in an 1879 6 Day Race at Madison Square Garden where he covered 565 miles and won $21,567 in prize money (equivalent to $745,217 in 2025). Later in life Hart played briefly on segregated baseball teams. Though his legacy faded with the loss of interest in pedestrianism as a spectator sport, Hart remains one of the first nationally famous Black athletes in America.

== Early life and rise to fame as a pedestrian ==
Born in 1856 as Fred Hichborn, Hart immigrated to Boston from Haiti as a teenager and worked as a grocery store clerk before joining races to earn extra money. Hart was also known as "The Negro Wonder" and "Black Dan", after his mentor and promoter Dan O'Leary. Hart competed in at least 63 six-day pedestrian races from 1879-1902, winning 16 of them. Hart was ultimately one of the first black sports celebrities in America.

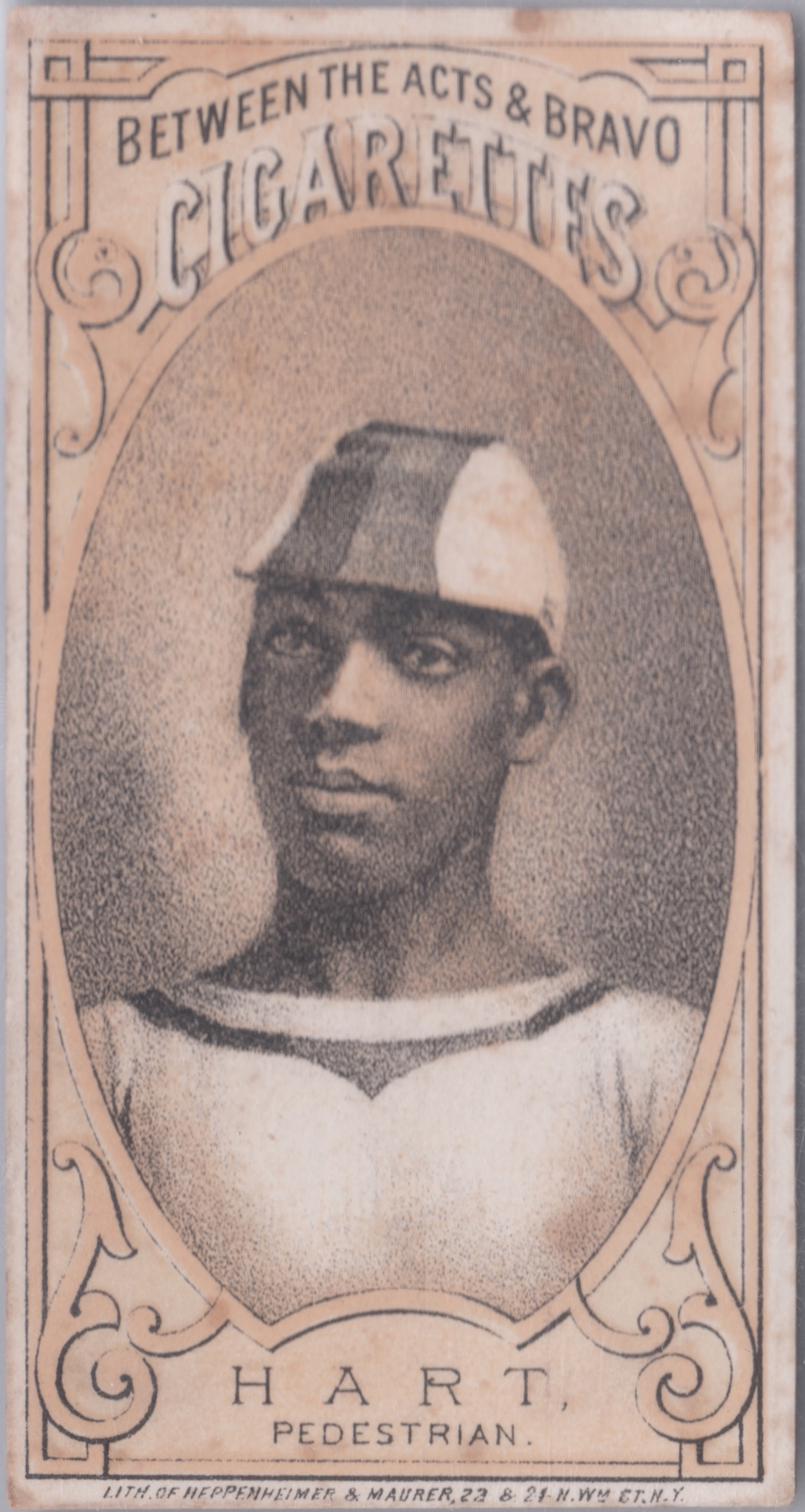
Frank Hart card from Thomas H. Hall’s Between the Acts & Bravo Cigarettes (1880) Athlete Set.

The first black athlete depicted on a sports card, trading card or tobacco card, Hart appears in Thomas H. Hall’s Between the Acts & Bravo Cigarettes set (1880, N344), along with nine other pedestrians and two oarsmen.

Despite not having any practice in roller skating, Hart competed in a six-day roller skating race held at Madison Square Garden from March 2–8, 1885. Hart did not take well to skating, and withdrew from the race on its second day.

== Baseball career and later life ==
Hart later played shortstop and second base on Black baseball teams. In 1883, he was a member of the Boston Vendome Hotel B.B.C. team, and in 1883-1884, Hart played for Saratoga Spring's Leonidas B.B.C. According to The Negro Leagues Were Major Leagues: Historians Reappraise Black Baseball, "Henry Bridgewater recruited Hart for the St. Louis Black Stockings." While no statistics are currently available for his tenure on the team, in May 1884, The Washington Bee reported that the “colored pedestrian plays shortstop for a colored baseball club known as the St. Louis Black Stockings.” Hart eventually signed with Chicago's Illinois Gordon B.B.C.

In Hart’s obituary in 1908, the Cleveland Gazette noted, “Like many other sporting men, he was a big liver and a good spender,’’ reportedly living off “the charity of friends” for his final years.

== See also ==
- List of African-American firsts
