= Edward Payson Weston =

American pedestrian (1839–1929)

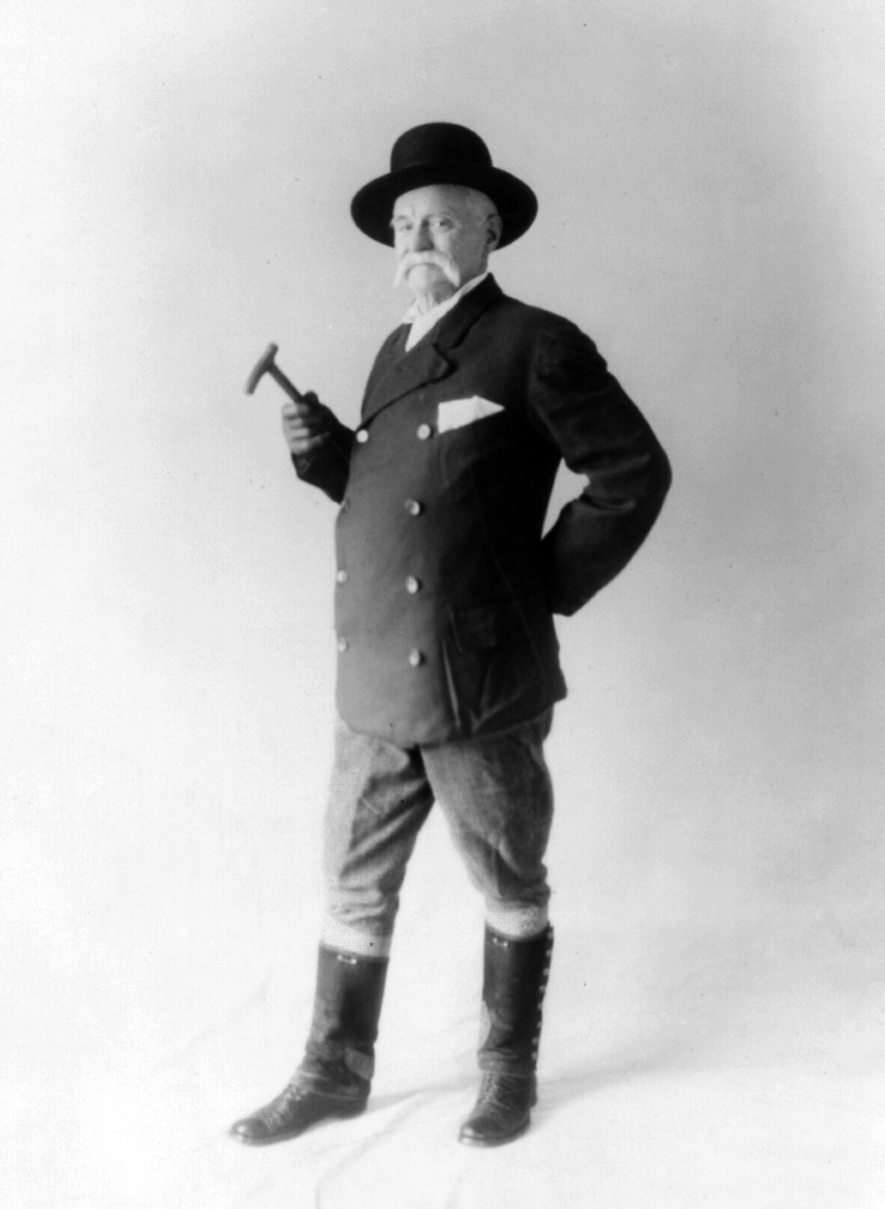
- Weston in 1909
- Born: March 15, 1839; Providence, Rhode Island, U.S.
- Died: May 12, 1929 (aged 90); Brooklyn, New York, U.S.
- Resting place: St. John Cemetery, Queens, New York
- Occupation: Long distance walker
- Years active: 1861-1913
- Known for: Founder of Pedestrianism
- Spouse: Maria Fox
- Children: 3

Edward Payson Weston (March 15, 1839 – May 12, 1929) was a pedestrian, who was largely responsible for the rise in popularity of the sport in the 1860s and 1870s.

== Biography ==
Edward Payson Weston was born on March 15, 1839, in Providence, Rhode Island to Silas Weston, a teacher and publisher, and Maria Gaines, a writer. As a teenager, Weston published books about his father's trips to the California Gold Rush and to the Azores, and he also published a novel written by his mother in 1859. During childhood Weston moved frequently, and by his own account, spent some time travelling with the popular Hutchinson Family Singers.

He first received attention as a notable pedestrian in 1861, when he walked 478 miles (769 km) from Boston, Massachusetts to Washington, D.C. in 10 days and 10 hours, from February 22 to March 4. During the walk, he faced snow, rain, and mud, and he fell several times. His longest period of uninterrupted sleep was 6 hours, and he usually ate while walking. He arrived in Washington at 5:00 pm, and was strong enough to attend Abraham Lincoln's inaugural ball that evening.

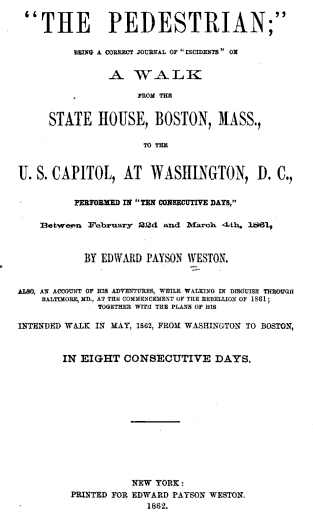
Title page of Weston's account of his Boston-DC walk in 1861

The walk was part of the terms of a bet on the 1860 presidential election. The bettor whose candidate lost was to walk to Washington to see the inauguration of the new president. Weston lost when he bet against Lincoln, and received only a bag of peanuts for his trouble. However, he also received newspaper coverage and a congratulatory handshake from the new president, which inspired him to further pedestrian feats.

In 1867, Weston walked from Portland, Maine to Chicago, Illinois, covering over 1200 miles (1900 km) in 26 days, winning a prize of $10,000. He received several death threats from gamblers who had bet against him, and was attacked once. He gave lectures to crowds of spectators on the health benefits of walking, both during the walk and afterwards.

Over the next few decades, Weston continued his professional walking career. While he was sometimes beaten in indoor multiday races, he held numerous records for long-distance endurance events. In 1869 he walked 1058 miles (1703 km) through snow-covered New England in 30 days. In 1871, he walked backwards for 200 miles around St. Louis, Missouri in 41 hours. In 1874, after several failed attempts, he became the first person in the world to walk 500 miles in six days, accomplished in Newark, New Jersey. He won the first six-day race in history, in 1875 that was held in P.T. Barnum's Hippodrome in New York City.

In 1876, Weston began an 8-year tour of Europe, starting in London, England, where he challenged England's racewalking champion, William Perkins, to a 24-hour, 115 mile ultramarathon, around a track in the Royal Agricultural Hall in Islington, London. The Englishman quit 14 hours and 65.6 miles into the race, but Weston walked the full 24 hours and covered 109.5 miles, 5½ miles less than his goal,. His performance caused a bit of a controversy when he later admitted to having been chewing coca leaf throughout much of the race, popularizing the chewing of coca leaf in Britain.

In 1879, he defeated the British champion "Blower" Brown, in a 550-mile (890 km) match which he walked in 141 hours 44 minutes, winning him the prestigious Astley Belt.

In March 1884 he completed his Temperance walk of 5000 miles in 100 days, excluding Sundays, with a meeting at the Royal Victoria Coffee Hall, Lambeth, chaired by Dr Norman Kerr.

In April 1906, Weston walked from Philadelphia to New York, a distance of over 100 miles, in less than 24 hours.

In 1907, at the age of 68, Weston repeated his Maine-to-Chicago walk of 1867, beating his own time by over 24 hours. In 1909, he walked 4,000 miles, from New York to San Francisco, in 100 days.

His last great journey was in 1913, when he walked 1546 miles (2488 km) from New York to Minneapolis in 51 days.

Weston spent most of the remainder of his life urging others to take up walking for exercise and competition. He warned that automobiles were making people lazy and sedentary.

== Death ==
Weston was severely injured when he was struck by a New York City taxicab in 1927, and never walked again. He died in his sleep at his Brooklyn home on May 12, 1929. Weston was buried at St. John Cemetery in Queens.

== Legacy ==
Weston was the subject of a 2012 biography, A Man in a Hurry, described by U.S. sports writer Brian Phillips as "a spectacularly entertaining book." A career biography, Weston, Weston, Rah-Rah-Rah!, was also published in 2012.
