= Foster Powell =

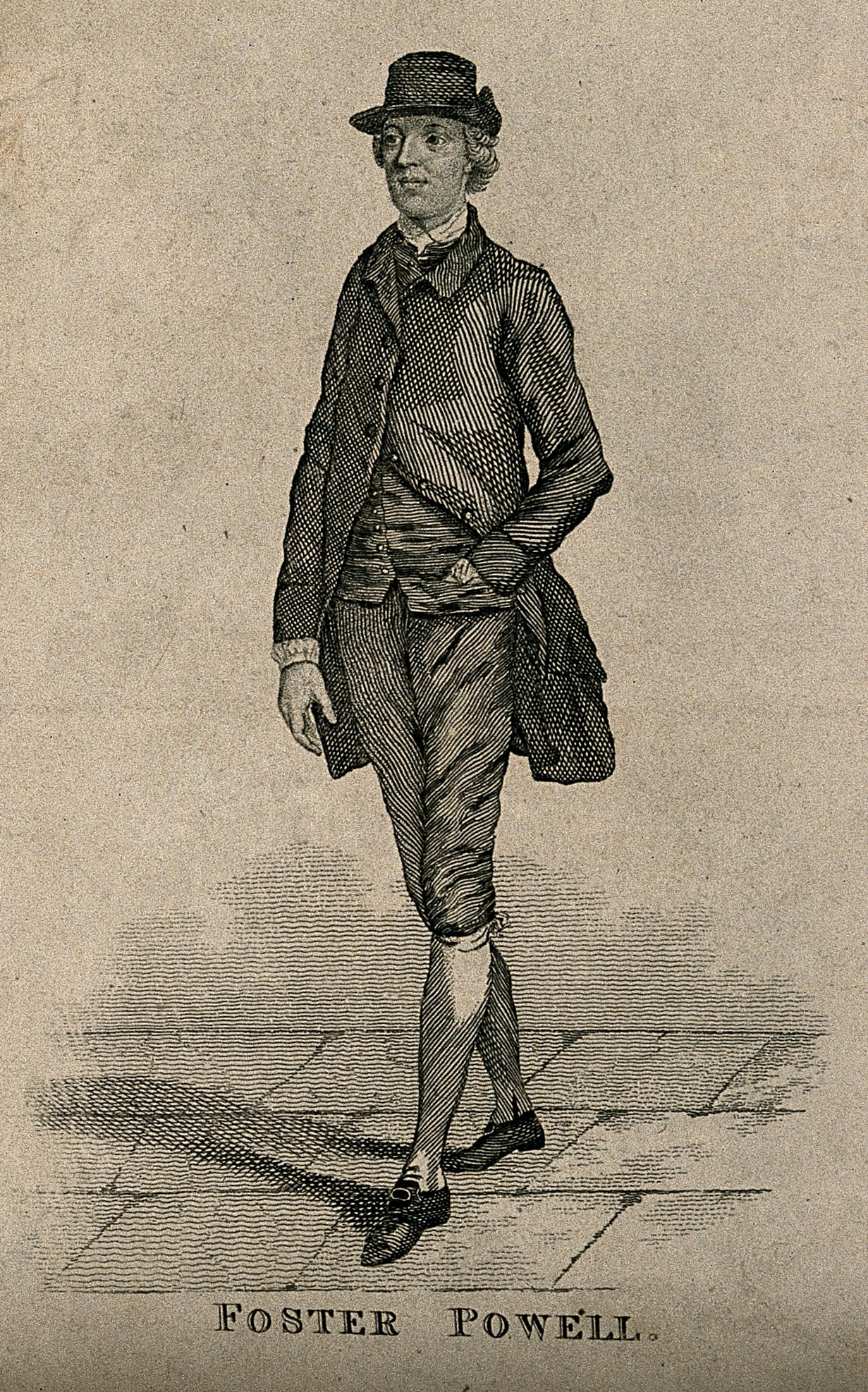
Foster Powell contemporary etching

Foster Powell (1734–15 April 1793) was the first notable exponent of long-distance walking known as pedestrianism and has been called "the first English athlete of whom we have any record". Powell started the focus on walking/running for six days and is considered the "Father of the Six-Day Race".

== Life ==
Powell was baptized in Horsforth in 1734, and moved to London in 1762 where he worked as a lawyer's clerk. In 1764 he began his pedestrian career by wagering that he could walk 50 miles in 7 hours, which he accomplished on the Bath Road. He became a national celebrity, but made very little money from walking, which he treated as a hobby, and died in relative poverty at the age of 59 on 15 April 1793. He was buried at St Faith's Church in St Paul's Cathedral Churchyard, after a walking funeral procession.

== Feats ==
Powell had experience walking long distances as early as circa 1771, when he walked about 400 miles (640 km) from London to York and back to get a lease signed in less than six days.

In 1773, Powell accepted a wager to walk the same route within six days again. He left Hicks Hall at 12:19 PM on 29 November 1773 and reached York at 2:30 AM on 31 November. He arrived back at Hicks Hall at 6:30 PM on 4 December 1773. On his return, about 3,000 people accompanied him from Highgate into London, and he won a bet of approximately £100 (equivalent to £12,644 in 2023).

He committed to repeat the same feat thirteen years later in 1785.

In 1788, Powell walked 100 miles in 21 hours 35 minutes. He also ran 2 miles in 10 minutes.

In November 1789, Powell attempted to run one mile in less than 5 minutes and 20 seconds for a £20 wager.

In 1790 at over 55 years old, Powell walked 394 miles in 136 hours and 13 minutes, just one hour and 47 minutes under the time allotted to him to win a bet.

In September 1790, Powell was crowned at Astley's Amphitheatre to recognize his achievements. The crowning was done to resemble Roman victory celebrations.
