= Across the Years =

Annual ultra-day marathons in Phoenix, Arizona

Across The Years is a series of timed multi-day ultra-marathons by Aravaipa Running, held from December 28 to January 1 each year outside Phoenix, Arizona. It consists of a 24-hour race, a 48-hour race, a 72-hour race and a 6-day race, 200/100 miles and other options. The 6-day race was reintroduced for the 2013–2014 edition.

All races are held on a 1.05 mile loop at Camelback Ranch in Glendale, AZ. The 6-day race begins on December 28 and ends on January 3. The 72-hour race starts at 9 am on December 29 and ends at 9 am on January 1. The 24-hour race is held in three sessions, one each day during the 72-hour race, from 9 am to 9 am. The 48-hour race is likewise held in two sessions, overlapping on the second day.

Until 2010, participants had to be picked in a lottery to have an opportunity to participate. However, due to the increased capacity at Camelback Ranch, in 2011 the lottery was removed and registration was once again offered to all on a first-come, first-served basis.

Founded in 1983 by Harold Sieglaff, the race has changed over the years in location as well as organization. In its first year, 6- and 12-hour races were offered. In the 1999–2000 event, a 6-day race was offered and reintroduced in 2013–2014. Until 1993 the race was held at Washington High School in Phoenix, after which it was moved to different locations, including a 500-meter certified loop at Nardini Manor in Buckeye, AZ from 2003 until 2010. It was held at Camelback Ranch in Glendale, AZ from 2011 until 2023. 2024 and 2025 saw it held at the Peoria Sports Complex, Peoria, AZ.

== Race records ==
Category	Participant	Year	Age	Distance
Six Day Male	Joe Fejes	2013	48	555.361 miles
Six Day Female	Sue Scholl	2014	42	437.769 miles
72 Hour Male	Joe Fejes	2012	47	329.640 miles
72 Hour Female	Marylou Corino	2013	35	265.600 miles
48 Hour Male	John Geesler	2003	44	248.550 miles
48 Hour Female	Fumie Sata	2003	42	215.310 miles
24 Hour Male	Joseph Gaebler	2002	26	145.401 miles
24 Hour Female	Stephanie Ehret	2003	40	130.490 miles
