= Pedestrianism =

19th-century competitive walking contest

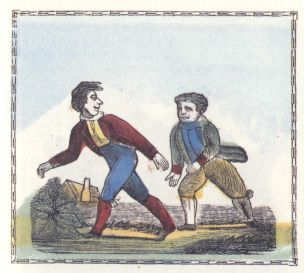
- An 1836 illustration of a "Walking Wager", from Peter Piper's Practical Principles of Plain and Perfect Pronunciation, by Anonymous, Philadelphia

Presence
- Country or region: British Isles
- Olympic: No
- Paralympic: No
- Obsolete: Yes

Pedestrianism was a 19th-century form of competitive walking, often professional and funded by wagering, from which the modern sport of race walking developed.

== 18th- and early 19th-century Britain ==
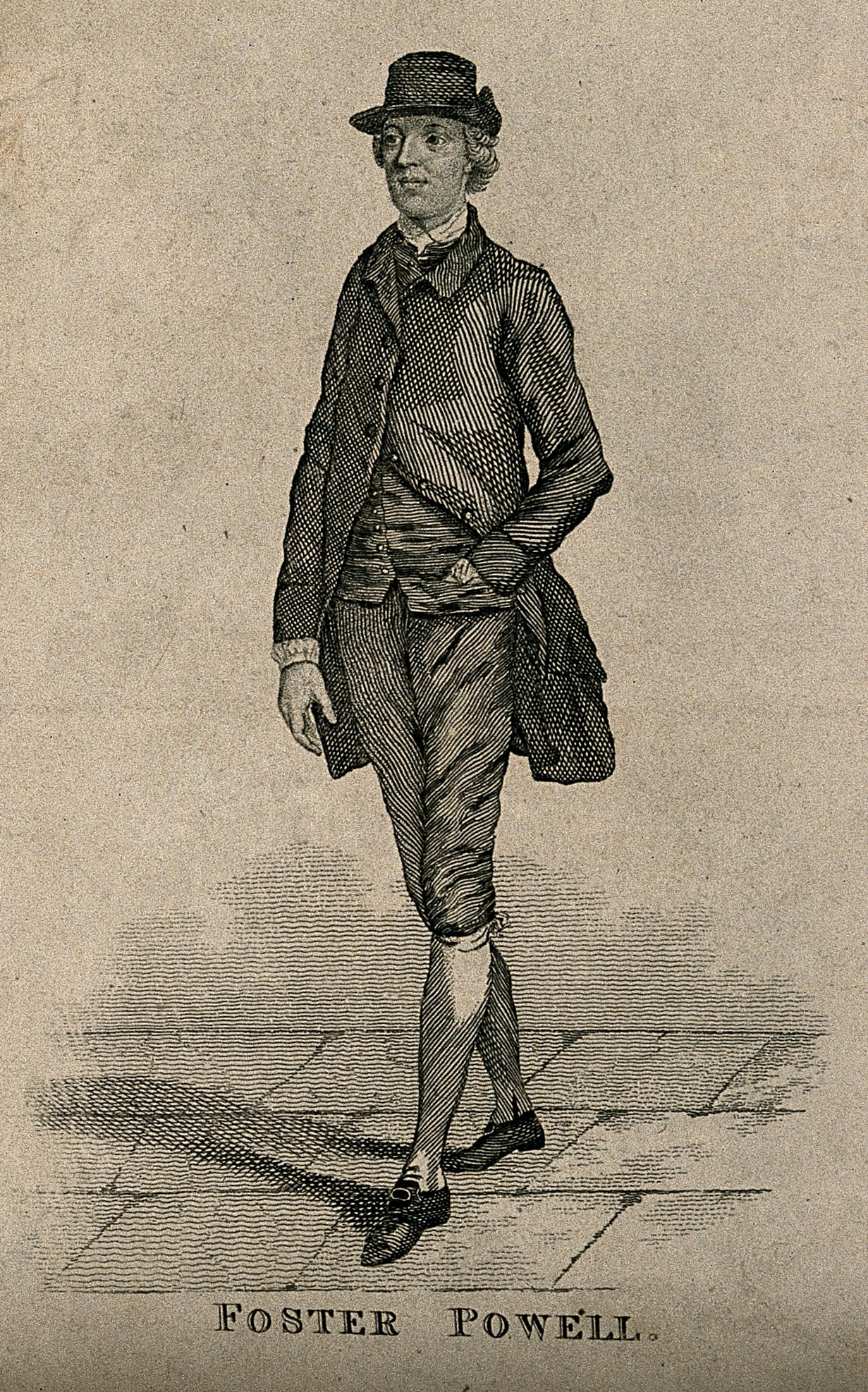
Foster Powell

During the late eighteenth and nineteenth centuries, pedestrianism, like running or horse racing (equestrianism), was a popular spectator sport in Britain and Ireland. Pedestrianism became a fixture at fairs—much like horse racing—developing from wagers on footraces, rambling, and 17th-century footman wagering. Sources from the late 17th and early 18th century in England describe aristocrats pitting their carriage footmen, who were constrained to walk by the speed of their masters' carriages, against one another. One of the earliest examples is of Robert Carey, 1st Earl of Monmouth, who walked from London to Berwick in twelve days for a £2000 wager in the summer of 1589.

The first notable exponent of this long-distance walking is generally considered to be Foster Powell (1734–93), who, in 1773, walked 400 miles (640 km) from London to York and back, and, in 1788, walked 100 miles (160 km) in 21 hours 35 minutes. By the end of the 18th century, and especially with the growth of the popular press, feats of foot travel over great distances (similar to a modern ultramarathon) gained attention and were labelled 'pedestrianism'.

== Distance feats and wagering ==
One of the most famous pedestrians of the day was Captain Robert Barclay Allardice, called 'The Celebrated Pedestrian', of Stonehaven. His most impressive feat was to walk 1 mile (1.6 km) every hour for 1,000 hours, which he achieved between 1 June and 12 July 1809. The feat captured the public's imagination, and around 10,000 people came to watch over the course of the event. During the 19th century, attempts to repeat the athletic challenge were made by many pedestrians, including George Wilson, who attempted to walk 1,000 miles (1,600 km) in 480 hours in 1815 but was arrested after three-quarters of the distance for disturbing the peace. Emma Sharp was thought to be the first woman to complete the challenge of 1,000 miles (1,600 km) in 1,000 hours, on 29 October 1864.

Later race walkers proved to be more successful, especially Ada Anderson, who, after walking 1,500 miles (2,400 km) in 1,000 hours, was labelled by the press the 'Champion Lady Walker of the World'. This feat had been achieved by a man in 1852. Thomas Hicks, from Leeds, walked 1,500 miles in 1,000 hours at the Royal Oak Grounds, on Barking Road, Canning Town. He started on Monday 22 March and finished at 22 minutes past three on the morning of Monday 3 May 1852. Despite the early hour, upwards of 4,000 spectators were there at the finish, and 'the last mile and a half was walked in procession with lighted torches, a band of music, and a large bonfire blazed forth to welcome the accomplishment of this unprecedented feat.' Ada Anderson's trainer, William Gale, is also alleged to have completed the feat. Another popular goal was for competitors in long-distance events to walk 100 miles (160 km) in less than 24 hours, from which they earned the nickname 'centurions'. Enormous cash prizes were offered for the races, and they were a popular activity for the press, crowds of working-class spectators, and the betting public until the 1880s.

== Growth and controversy ==
Interest in the sport, and the wagering that accompanied it, spread to the United States, Canada, and Australia in the 19th century. By the end of the 19th century, pedestrianism had been largely displaced by the rise of modern spectator sports and by controversy over rules, which limited its appeal as a focus for wagering and led to its incorporation into the amateur athletics movement and, eventually, the creation of race walking.

== Heel-to-toe rule ==
Pedestrianism was first codified in the latter half of the 19th century, evolving into what became race walking, while diverging from long-distance cross-country fell running, other track and field athletics, and recreational hiking or hillwalking. By the mid-19th century, competitors were often expected to extend their legs straight at least once in their stride and to obey what was called the 'fair heel and toe' rule. This rule—the source of modern race walking—was a vague commandment that the toe of one foot could not leave the ground before the heel of the next foot touched down; however, rules were customary and changed with competition. Racers were usually allowed to jog in order to fend off cramps, and it was distance, not code, that determined gait for longer races. Newspaper reports suggest that 'trotting' was common in events.

== Heyday ==
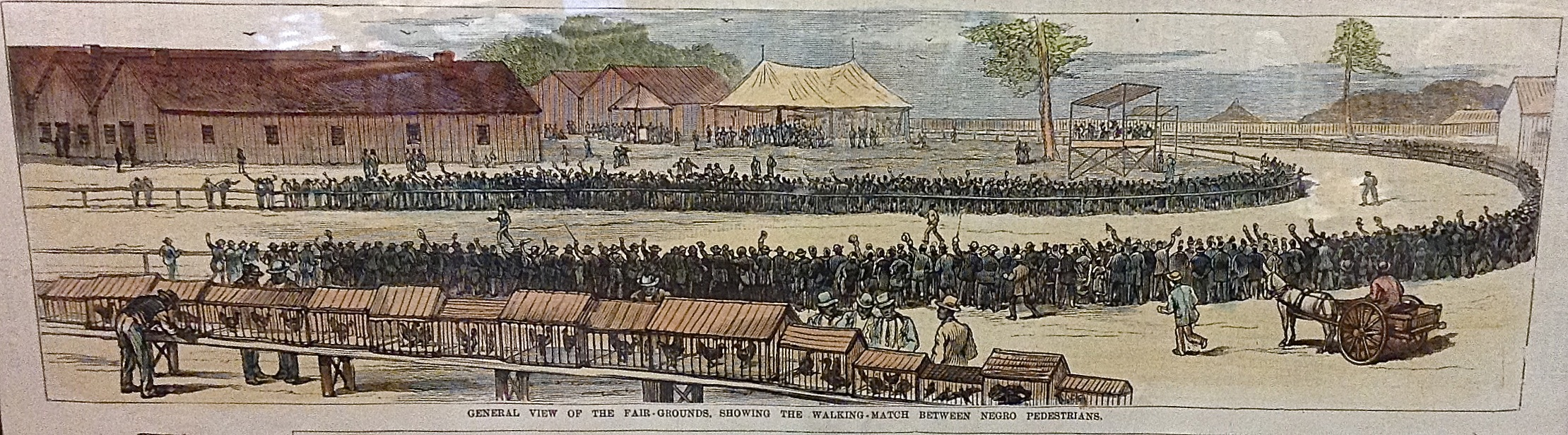
African American walking match at the North Carolina State Fairgrounds in Raleigh, North Carolina, 1879

The longer form of 'ultra marathon' walking featured in the popular press and, in the decade after the American Civil War in the United States, was a source of fascination. In 1867, Edward Payson Weston, a reporter for the New York Herald, won a $10,000 prize by walking 1,136 miles (1,828 km) from Portland, Maine, to Chicago in 30 days. In the United States, a series of women's competitions were staged, special indoor tracks were built in some towns, and intra-community long-distance pedestrianism came into vogue. American Elsa von Blumen competed as a pedestrian in events where she would walk 100 miles. Frank Hart was among the first African-American national sports celebrities for his achievements in the sport, such as setting a new 565-mile record in the 6 Day Race distance. Along with sensational feats of distance, gambling was a central attraction for the large, mostly working-class crowds which came to pedestrian events.

In the United Kingdom, Member of Parliament Sir John Astley founded a 'Long Distance Championship of the World' in 1878, staged over six days, which became known as the 'Astley Belt Races'. While marking a peak in press coverage of such races, the Astley Belt Races allowed a wide interpretation of rules, with trotting, jogging, and even some running allowed. The competition was partly inspired by a desire to clean up the perception of the sport as corrupted by gambling interests and led to a push among some to codify pedestrianism as an amateur sport. The same process was happening to British track and field athletics and gave rise to the modern Olympic Movement.

== Amateur sport and race walking ==
Walkers organised the first English amateur walking championship in 1866, which was won by John Chambers and judged under the 'fair heel and toe' rule. This vague code was the basis for the rules codified at the first championships meeting in 1880 of the Amateur Athletics Association in England, marking the birth of modern track and field. With football, cricket, and other sports being codified in the 19th century, the transition from professional pedestrianism to amateur codified race walking was part of a process of regularisation occurring in most modern sports at the time.

The codified race walk was included when the International Olympic Committee was formed in 1893. In the 1904 Olympic Games, the 'all-rounder' event—the forerunner of the decathlon—included an 880-yard (800 m) walk. It was only in the unofficial 'Interim Olympic Games' of 1906 that race walking became a separate event, and since the 1908 Olympic Games in London, it has been an official event in every Summer Games.

== See also ==
- Bertha von Hillern
- George Littlewood
- Len Hurst
- Multi-day race
- Charles Samuels (athlete)
