= Stu Mittleman =

American ultradistance runner

Stu Mittleman is an ultradistance running champion, as well as a fitness/running coach and author.

Mittleman set three consecutive American 100-Mile Road Race records in the US National Championships 1980–1982. His fastest 100-Mile Run was 12 hours 56 min . In 1986, he won the 1,000 Mile World Championship and set a new world record by running the distance (1 609.344 kilometers) in 11 days, 20 hours, 36 min. 50 sec. Mittleman set three consecutive modern-era American Records in the 6 Day Race, the final one being set in 1985 at the University of Colorado Field House with 577 miles.

In December 2008, Mittleman became the sixth American – the third American male – to be inducted into the American Ultrarunning Hall of Fame.
