= Techny, Illinois =

- Neighborhood
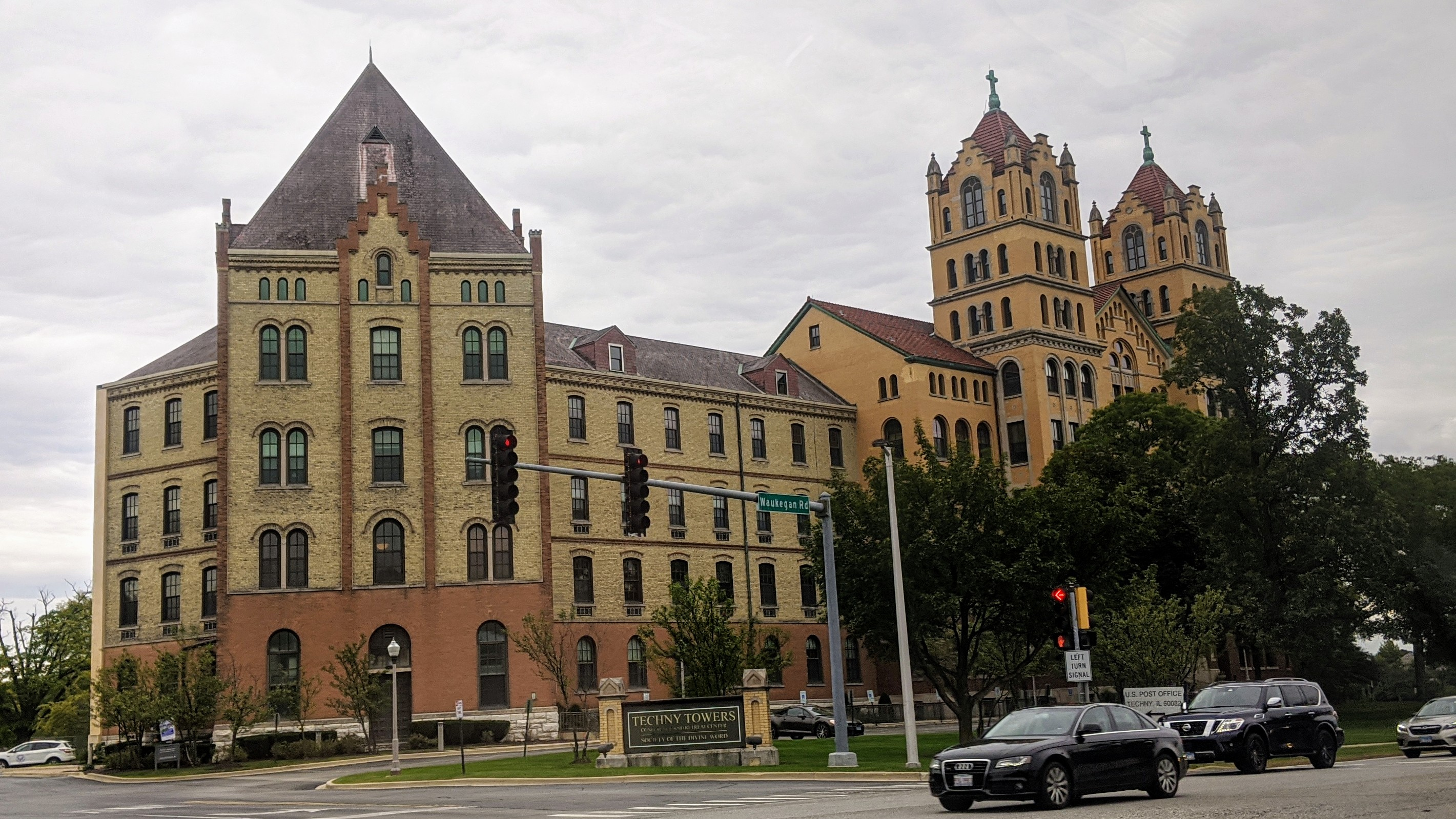
- Techny Towers

- Location within Illinois
- Coordinates: 42°06′58″N 87°49′20″W
- Country: United States
- State: Illinois
- County: Cook
- City: Northbrook
- Elevation: 643 ft (196 m)
- Time zone: UTC-6 (Central (CST))
  - Summer (DST): UTC-5 (CDT)
- ZIP code: 60082
- Area codes: 847 & 224
- GNIS feature ID: 1781997

Techny is a neighborhood of Northbrook, Illinois, United States. Once a separate community, it was annexed by Northbrook in 1989. The North American headquarters of the Divine Word Missionaries has been located in Techny since 1896. The area's name derived from St. Joseph's Technical School, which was a religious congregation established in 1901 that operated for twelve years. St. Mary's Mission Seminary, the first of its kind which prepared priests and Brothers for foreign missions, was opened by the Divine Word Missionaries in 1909. Techny has its own post office with ZIP code 60082.
