= Self-Transcendence 6- & 10-day Race =

Multi-day race

Coordinates: 40.739425°N 73.843132°W

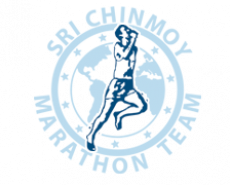
- Logo
- Date: April
- Location: New York City, United States
- Event type: Ultramarathon
- Established: 1977
- Website: srichinmoyraces.org

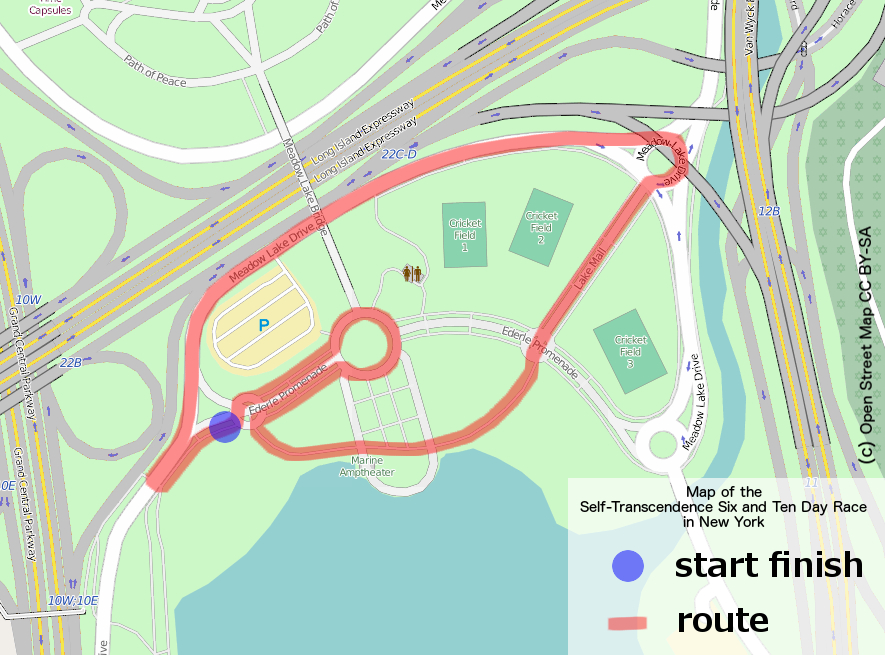
Map

The Self-Transcendence 6- & 10-day Race are two concurrent multiday running events, held in Flushing Meadows–Corona Park, a large public park in the borough of Queens in New York City. The course is one mile (1.6 km) long. They are held annually in April and organized by the Sri Chinmoy Marathon Team.

== History and records ==
The Team held a 1000-mile race in the spring of 1985, and later in the year held the first Sri Chinmoy Five Day Race at Flushing Meadows–Corona Park in Queens, which lasted for three consecutive years and led to the Seven-Day Race, the forerunner of today's Ten Day event. The first Five-Day Race featured 15 competitors, as did the first Seven-Day Race. By 1995 the longer event grew to 34 starters.

In the inaugural Seven-Day Race in 1988, Marty Sprengelmeyer of Davenport, Iowa narrowly beat women's winner Suprabha Beckjord of Washington, DC, 527 miles to 521 miles.

In 1990 ultramarathoner Al Howie set a new record of 530 miles. The following year Charlie Eidel of Gardiner, NY ran 550 miles for a new course record, while Suprabha Beckjord ran 523 to claim the women's record again. Suprabha won the ladies' Seven Day five times. In 1994 Antana Locs of Canada won the Seven-Day overall with 518 miles. Georgs Jermolajevs from Latvia won the Seven-Day Race in 1995, in record-setting fashion, running 578 miles, while England's Pippa Davis won the women's title as she ran 525 miles. In the 1996 inaugural Ten Day Race, Georgs Jermolajevs again fashioned a victory with 725 miles, closely followed by Dipali Cunningham of Australia, who garnered 723 miles for the ladies. In a smaller field in 1997 veteran Donald Winkley of Corpus Christi, Texas prevailed with 530 miles.

1998 the Sri Chinmoy Marathon Team added the 6-day race to their calendar in this year Dipali Cunningham breaking Sandy Barwick's record with 504 miles. In 2000 Ted Corbitt at 81 set a new World age-group best (80-84) with 240 miles and in the following year, 2001 Dipali Cunningham won the 6-day overall and set a new World Record with 510 miles.

In May 2021 6-day Race was held for the first time at another venue in Bulgaria, Sofia. Due to the COVID-19 pandemic situation.

In April 2022 the 6 day race took place without the 10 Day.

== See also ==
- Self-Transcendence 3100 Mile Race
