= Suprabha Beckjord =

American ultramarathon runner

Personal information
- Nationality: American
- Born: 1956 (age 69–70)

Sport
- Country: United States
- Sport: Ultramarathon
- Event: 3100 miles run

Achievements and titles
- Personal best: 49 days+14:30:54 (1998)

Suprabha Beckjord (born 1956) is an ultramarathon runner from Washington, D.C. She is an owner of a gift shop and a disciple of Sri Chinmoy.

== History ==
In 1986, she began with a 7 km run. Her first Marathon was the Inspiration Marathon in Vermont. She progressed to multiday races, including seven-day races, and 1,300 mile races. She was the subject of a short documentary by Jessie Beers-Altman entitled 'The Spirit of a Runner' (2009).

== Records ==
The only woman to have completed every edition of the world's longest certified footrace, the Self-Transcendence 3100 Mile Race as winner until 2009.

“ Anyone can do this, if they set their mind to it. ”

— Suprabha Beckjord

== Racing history ==
Statistic (World Records highlighted)
Year	Name	Length (miles)	Placing	Records
1986	200-Mile Race	200	1	
1987	Five Day Race	347	1	
1988	Seven Day Race	521	1	
1988	700-Mile Race	700	1	US Record
1989	Seven Day Race	470	1	
1989	1000-Mile Race	1000	1	World Record
1990	Seven Day Race	500	1	
1991	Seven Day Race	523	1	
1991	1300-Mile Race	1201	3	
1992	Seven Day Race	484	1	
1992	1300-Mile Race	1300	1	US Record
1993	Seven Day Race	490	2	
1993	1300-Mile Race	1300	2	
1994	Seven Day Race	502	3	
1994	1300-Mile Race	1300	2	
1995	Seven Day Race	508	3	
1996	2700-Mile Race	2700	1	World Record
1997	3100-Mile Race	3100	1	World Record
1998	3100-Mile Race	3100	1	World Record
1999	3100-Mile Race	3100	1	
2000	3100-Mile Race	3100	1	
2001	3100-Mile Race	3100	1	
2002	3100-Mile Race	3100	1	
2003	3100-Mile Race	3100	1	
2004	3100-Mile Race	3100	1	
2005	3100-Mile Race	3100	1	
2006	3100-Mile Race	3100	1	
2007	3100-Mile Race	3100	1	
2008	3100-Mile Race	3100	1	
2009	3100-Mile Race	3100	1	
