= List of European records in athletics =

European records in the sport of athletics are ratified by the European Athletic Association. Records are kept for all events contested at the Olympic Games and some others. Unofficial records for some other events are kept by track and field statisticians. Records are kept for events in track and field, road running, and racewalking.

== Key to tables ==
Key: Pending ratification Record not kept by European Athletics Not ratified or later rescinded by European Athletics

# = not recognised by European Athletics or/and World Athletics
a = aided road course according to World Athletics rule 31.21.3 (separation between start and finish points more than 50% of race distance or the decrease in elevation greater than one in a thousand)
est = estimate
WB = world best

== Outdoor ==
=== Men ===
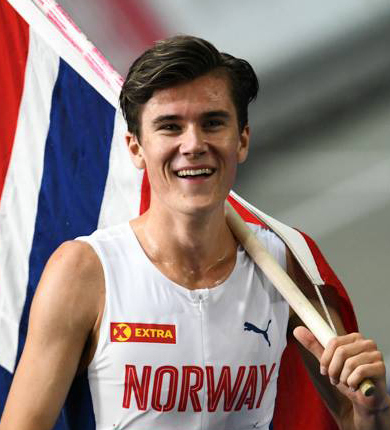
Jakob Ingebrigtsen holds the 2000m and 3000m world record, the two mile world best, along with the 1,500m and mile European records.

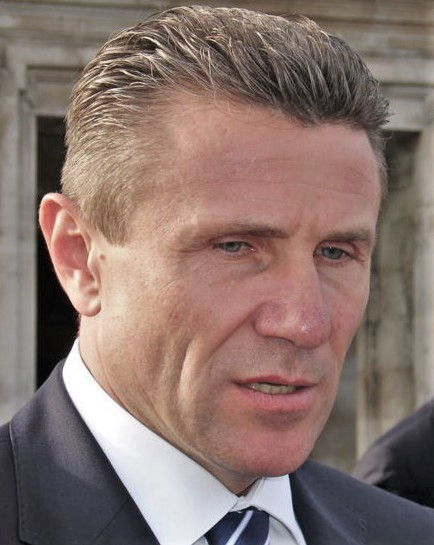
Sergey Bubka's world and European records in pole vault have dominated the sport, marking him as one of the world's best athletes.

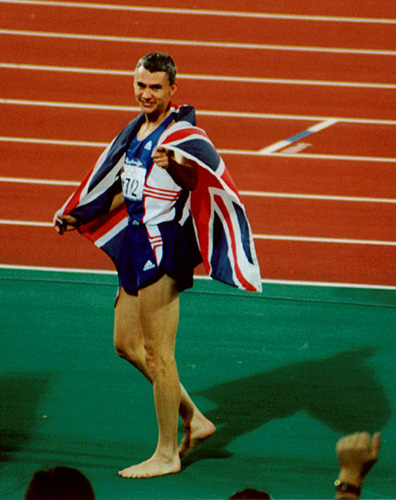
Jonathan Edwards broke the triple jump world record three times.

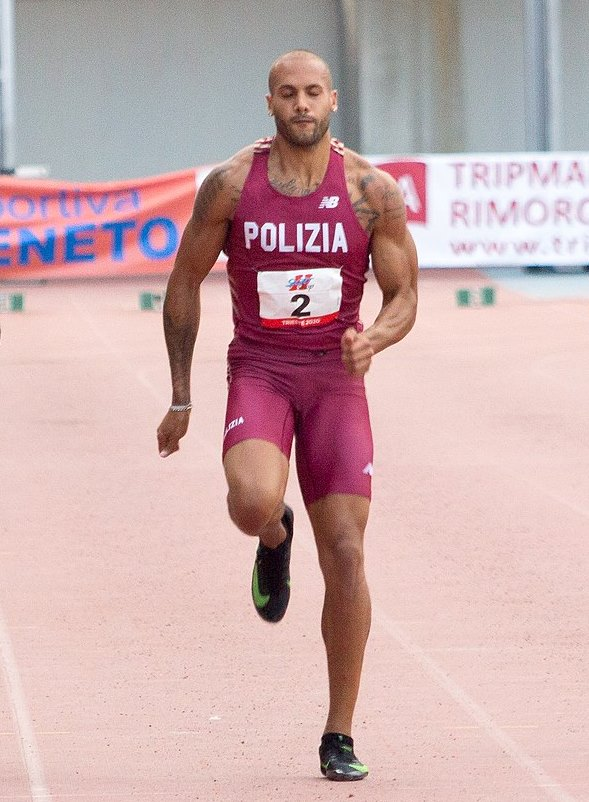
Marcell Jacobs set the European record in the 100 metres winning the gold medal at the 2020 Tokyo Olympics.

Event	Record	Athlete	Nationality	Date	Meet	Place	Ref.	Video
100 m	9.80 (+0.1 m/s)	Marcell Jacobs	Italy	1 August 2021	Olympic Games	Tokyo, Japan		
150 m (straight)	14.66 (+0.3 m/s)	Zharnel Hughes	Great Britain	18 May 2024	Atlanta City Games	Atlanta, United States		
200 m	19.72 A (+1.8 m/s)	Pietro Mennea	Italy	12 September 1979	Universiade	Mexico City, Mexico		
400 m	43.44	Matthew Hudson-Smith	Great Britain	7 August 2024	Olympic Games	Paris, France		
800 m	1:41.11	Wilson Kipketer	Denmark	24 August 1997	Weltklasse in Köln	Cologne, Germany		
1000 m	2:12.18	Sebastian Coe	Great Britain	11 July 1981	Bislett Games	Oslo, Norway		
1500 m	3:26.73	Jakob Ingebrigtsen	Norway	12 July 2024	Herculis	Fontvieille, Monaco		
Mile	3:42.66	Josh Kerr	Great Britain	18 July 2026	London Athletics Meet	London, United Kingdom		
Mile (road)	3:51.3 h	Elliot Giles	Great Britain	1 September 2024	New Balance Kö Meile	Düsseldorf, Germany		
Mile (road)	3:44.3 a	Josh Kerr	Great Britain	8 September 2024	New Balance Fifth Avenue Mile	New York City, United States		
2000 m	4:43.13	Jakob Ingebrigtsen	Norway	8 September 2023	Memorial Van Damme	Brussels, Belgium		
3000 m	7:17.55	Jakob Ingebrigtsen	Norway	25 August 2024	Kamila Skolimoswka Memorial	Chorzów, Poland		
Two miles	7:54.10	Jakob Ingebrigtsen	Norway	9 June 2023	Meeting de Paris	Paris, France		
5000 m	12:44.27	Andreas Almgren	Sweden	15 June 2025	BAUHAUS-galan	Stockholm, Sweden		
5 km (road)	12:51	Jimmy Gressier	France	4 April 2026	Urban Trail de Lille	Lille, France		
10,000 m	26:46.57	Mo Farah	Great Britain	3 June 2011	Prefontaine Classic	Eugene, United States		
10 km (road)	26:45	Andreas Almgren	Sweden	11 January 2026	10K Valencia Ibercaja	Valencia, Spain		
10 km (road)	26:43	Yann Schrub	France	22 February 2026	10K Facsa Castelló	Castellón de la Plana, Spain		
15 km (road)	41:47+	Andreas Almgren	Sweden	20 September 2026	World Road Running Championships	Copenhagen, Denmark		
10 miles	45:14	Charles Hicks	Great Britain	6 April 2025	USA 10 Mile Road Running Championships	Washington, United States		
20,000 m (track)	56:20.02+	Bashir Abdi	Belgium	4 September 2020	Memorial Van Damme	Brussels, Belgium		
20 km (road)	55:20+	Andreas Almgren	Sweden	20 September 2026	World Road Running Championships	Copenhagen, Denmark		
Half marathon	58:06	Andreas Almgren	Sweden	20 September 2026	World Road Running Championships	Copenhagen, Denmark		
One hour	21330 m	Mo Farah	Great Britain	4 September 2020	Memorial van Damme	Brussels, Belgium		
25,000 m (track)	1:12:46.5 h	Sondre Nordstad Moen	Norway	11 June 2020	Bislett Impossible Games	Oslo, Norway		
25 km (road)	1:13:25+	Bashir Abdi	Belgium	1 March 2020	Tokyo Marathon	Tokyo, Japan		
30,000 m (track)	1:31:30.4 h	Jim Alder	Great Britain	5 September 1970		London, United Kingdom		
30 km (road)	1:27:53 +	Bashir Abdi	Belgium	24 October 2021	Rotterdam Marathon	Rotterdam, The Netherlands		
Marathon	2:03:36	Bashir Abdi	Belgium	24 October 2021	Rotterdam Marathon	Rotterdam, The Netherlands		
50 km (track)	3:01:51+	Aleksandr Sorokin	Lithuania	23 April 2022	Centurion RC 100	Bedford, United Kingdom		
50 km (road)
50 km (road)	2:46:09	Alex Milne	Great Britain	14 March 2026	IAU 50 km World Championships	New Delhi, India		
50 miles (track)	4:51:49	Don Ritchie	Great Britain	12 March 1983	Road Runners Club Track 50 Miles	London, United Kingdom		
6 hours (track)	98.496 km+	Aleksandr Sorokin	Lithuania	23 April 2022	Centurion RC 100	Bedford, United Kingdom		
100 km (track)	6:05:41	Aleksandr Sorokin	Lithuania	23 April 2022	Centurion RC 100	Bedford, United Kingdom		
100 km (road)	6:05:35	Aleksandr Sorokin	Lithuania	14 May 2023	Nord Security World's Fastest Run	Vilnius, Lithuania		
100 km (road)	6:04:10# (Note: Non-ratifiable as the athlete ran behind a car, wore unratified prototype shoes, and was paced by rotating pacemakers)	Aleksandr Sorokin	Lithuania	26 August 2025	Chasing 100	Nardò Ring, Italy		
150 km (track)	10:27:48+	Aleksandr Sorokin	Lithuania	24 April 2021	Centurion Running Track 100 Mile	Ashford, United Kingdom		
100 miles (track)	11:14:56+	Aleksandr Sorokin	Lithuania	24 April 2021	Centurion Running Track 100 Mile	Ashford, United Kingdom		
100 miles (road)	10:51:39+	Aleksandr Sorokin	Lithuania	6 January 2022	Spartanion Race	Tel Aviv, Israel		
12 hours (track)	170.309 km	Aleksandr Sorokin	Lithuania	24 April 2021	Centurion Running Track 100 Mile	Ashford, United Kingdom		
12 hours (road)	177.410 km	Aleksandr Sorokin	Lithuania	6 January 2022	Spartanion Race	Tel Aviv, Israel		
24 hours (road)	319.614 km	Aleksandr Sorokin	Lithuania	18 September 2022	IAU 24 Hour European Championships	Verona, Italy		
48 hours (road)	485.099 km	Matthieu Bonne	Belgium	30 May–1 June 2025	UltraPark Weekend 48 Hour	Pabianice, Poland		
6 days (road)	1045.519 km	Matthieu Bonne	Belgium	5–11 September 2024	6 Day World Championships	Balatonfüred, Hungary		
110 m hurdles	12.91 (+0.5 m/s)	Colin Jackson	Great Britain	20 August 1993	World Championships	Stuttgart, Germany		
300 m hurdles	33.05	Karsten Warholm	Norway	26 April 2025	Xiamen Diamond League	Xiamen, China		
400 m hurdles	45.94	Karsten Warholm	Norway	3 August 2021	Olympic Games	Tokyo, Japan		
2000 m steeplechase	5:10.68 WB	Mahiedine Mekhissi-Benabbad	France	30 June 2010	Alma Athlé Tour	Reims, France		
3000 m steeplechase	7:57.80	Frederik Ruppert	Germany	31 May 2026	Meeting International Mohammed VI d'Athlétisme de Rabat	Rabat, Morocco		
High jump	2.42 m	Patrik Sjöberg	Sweden	30 June 1987	BAUHAUS-galan	Stockholm, Sweden		
High jump	2.42 m	Bohdan Bondarenko	Ukraine	14 June 2014	Adidas Grand Prix	New York City, United States		
Pole vault	6.30 m	Armand Duplantis	Sweden	15 September 2025	World Championships	Tokyo, Japan		
Long jump	8.86 m A (+1.9 m/s)	Robert Emmiyan	Soviet Union	22 May 1987		Tsaghkadzor, Soviet Union		
Triple jump	18.29 m (+1.3 m/s)	Jonathan Edwards	Great Britain	7 August 1995	World Championships	Gothenburg, Sweden		
Shot put	23.06 m	Ulf Timmermann	East Germany	22 May 1988		Chania, Greece		
Discus throw	75.56 m	Mykolas Alekna	Lithuania	13 April 2025	Oklahoma Throws Series World Invitational	Ramona, United States		
Hammer throw	86.74 m	Yuriy Sedykh	Soviet Union	30 August 1986	European Championships	Stuttgart, West Germany		
Javelin throw	98.48 m (current design)	Jan Železný	Czech Republic	25 May 1996		Jena, Germany		
Javelin throw	104.80 m (old design)	Uwe Hohn	East Germany	20 July 1984		Berlin, Germany		
Decathlon	9126 pts	Kevin Mayer	France	15–16 September 2018	Décastar	Talence, France		
Decathlon	100m (wind) / Long jump (wind) / Shot put / High jump / 400m / 110m H (wind) / Discus / Pole vault / Javelin / 1500m; 10.55 (+0.3 m/s) / 7.80 m (+1.2 m/s) / 16.00 m / 2.05 m / 48.42 / 13.75 (−1.1 m/s) / 50.54 m / 5.45 m / 71.90 m / 4:36.11							
3000 m walk (track)	10:43.84	Tom Bosworth	Great Britain	21 July 2018	Diamond League	London, United Kingdom		
5000 m walk (track)	18:02.38	Gabriel Bordier	France	10 June 2025	Meeting International de Montreuil	Montreuil, France		
5 km walk (road)	18:21	Robert Korzeniowski	Poland	15 September 1990		Bad Salzdetfurth, Germany		
10,000 m walk (track)	37:23.99	Gabriel Bordier	France	2 August 2025	French Championships	Talence, France		
10 km walk (road)	37:11	Roman Rasskazov	Russia	28 May 2000		Saransk, Russia		
20,000 m walk (track)	1:18:35.2	Stefan Johansson	Sweden	15 May 1992		Bergen, Norway		
20 km walk (road)	1:17:02	Yohann Diniz	France	8 March 2015	French Championships	Arles, France		
20 km walk (road)	1:16:43 (Note: Not ratified because it did not fulfil the criteria of having the required three international judges present.)	Sergey Morozov	Russia	8 June 2008		Saransk, Russia		
Half marathon walk (road)	1:23:00	Francesco Fortunato	Italy	8 May 2026	Poděbrady Walking	Poděbrady, Czech Republic		
2 hours walk (track)	29572 m +	Maurizio Damilano	Italy	3 October 1992		Cuneo, Italy		
30,000 m walk (track)	2:01:44.1	Maurizio Damilano	Italy	3 October 1992		Cuneo, Italy		
35 km walk (road)	2:20:43	Massimo Stano	Italy	18 May 2025	European Race Walking Team Championships	Poděbrady, Czech Republic		
Marathon walk (road)	2:56:49	Massimo Stano	Italy	15 August 2026	European Championships	Birmingham, United Kingdom		
50,000 m walk (track)	3:35:27.20	Yohann Diniz	France	12 March 2011		Reims, France		
50 km walk (road)	3:32:33	Yohann Diniz	France	15 August 2014	European Championships	Zürich, Switzerland		
4 × 100 m relay	37.36	Adam Gemili; Zharnel Hughes; Richard Kilty; Nethaneel Mitchell-Blake	Great Britain	5 October 2019	World Championships	Doha, Qatar		
4 × 200 m relay	1:20.66	Christophe Lemaitre; Yannick Fonsat; Ben Bassaw; Ken Romain	France	24 May 2014	IAAF World Relays	Nassau, Bahamas		
4 × 400 m relay	2:55.83	Alex Haydock-Wilson(44.51); Matthew Hudson-Smith(43.09); Lewis Davey(44.90); Charlie Dobson (43.33)	Great Britain	10 August 2024	Olympic Games	Paris, France		
4 × 800 m relay	7:03.89	Peter Elliott; Garry Cook; Steve Cram; Sebastian Coe	Great Britain	30 August 1982		London, United Kingdom		
Distance medley relay	9:24.07	Mateusz Demczyszak (1200 m); Łukasz Krawczuk (400 m); Adam Kszczot (800 m); Marcin Lewandowski (1600 m)	Poland	3 May 2015	IAAF World Relays	Nassau, Bahamas		
4 × 1500 m relay	14:38.8 h	Thomas Wessinghage; Harald Hudak; Michael Lederer; Karl Fleschen	West Germany	17 August 1977		Cologne, West Germany		
Marathon road relay (Ekiden)	2:02.34	Yuriy Abramov (13:47); Yevgeny Rybakov (28:29); Pavel Naumov (14:19); Dmitry Maksimov (29:47); Sergey Ivanov (14:30); Anatoly Rybakov (21:42)	Russia	23 November 2005	International Chiba Ekiden	Chiba, Japan		

=== Women ===
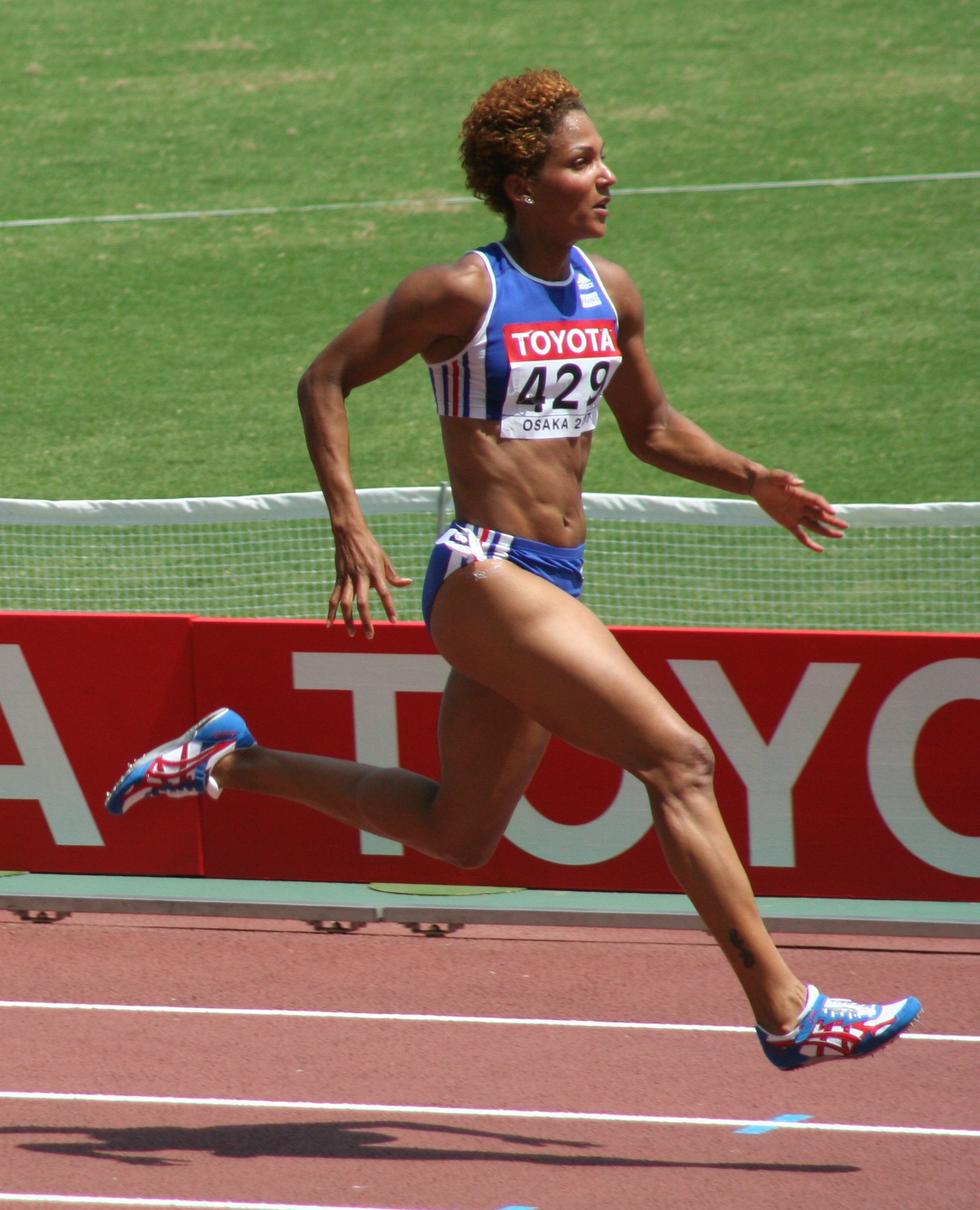
Only American, Ivorian and Jamaican sprinters have run faster than Christine Arron's 100 metres record.

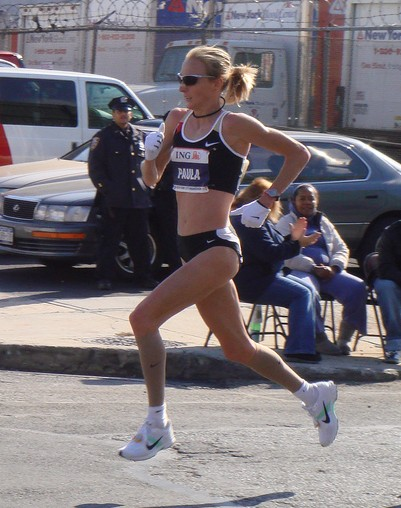
Paula Radcliffe has two world records and three European records to her name in the long distance events.

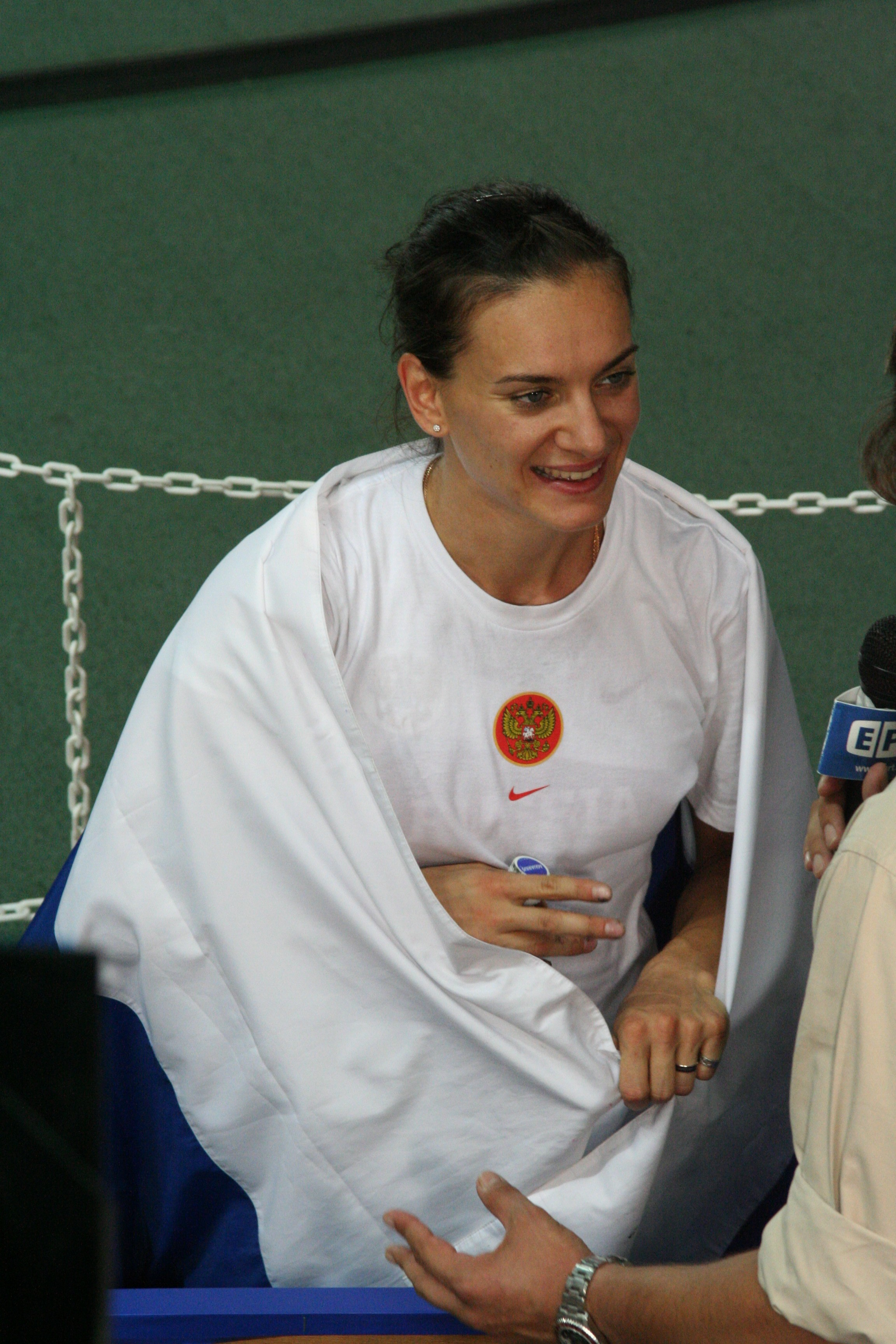
Yelena Isinbayeva has broken her own world and European pole vault record numerous times.

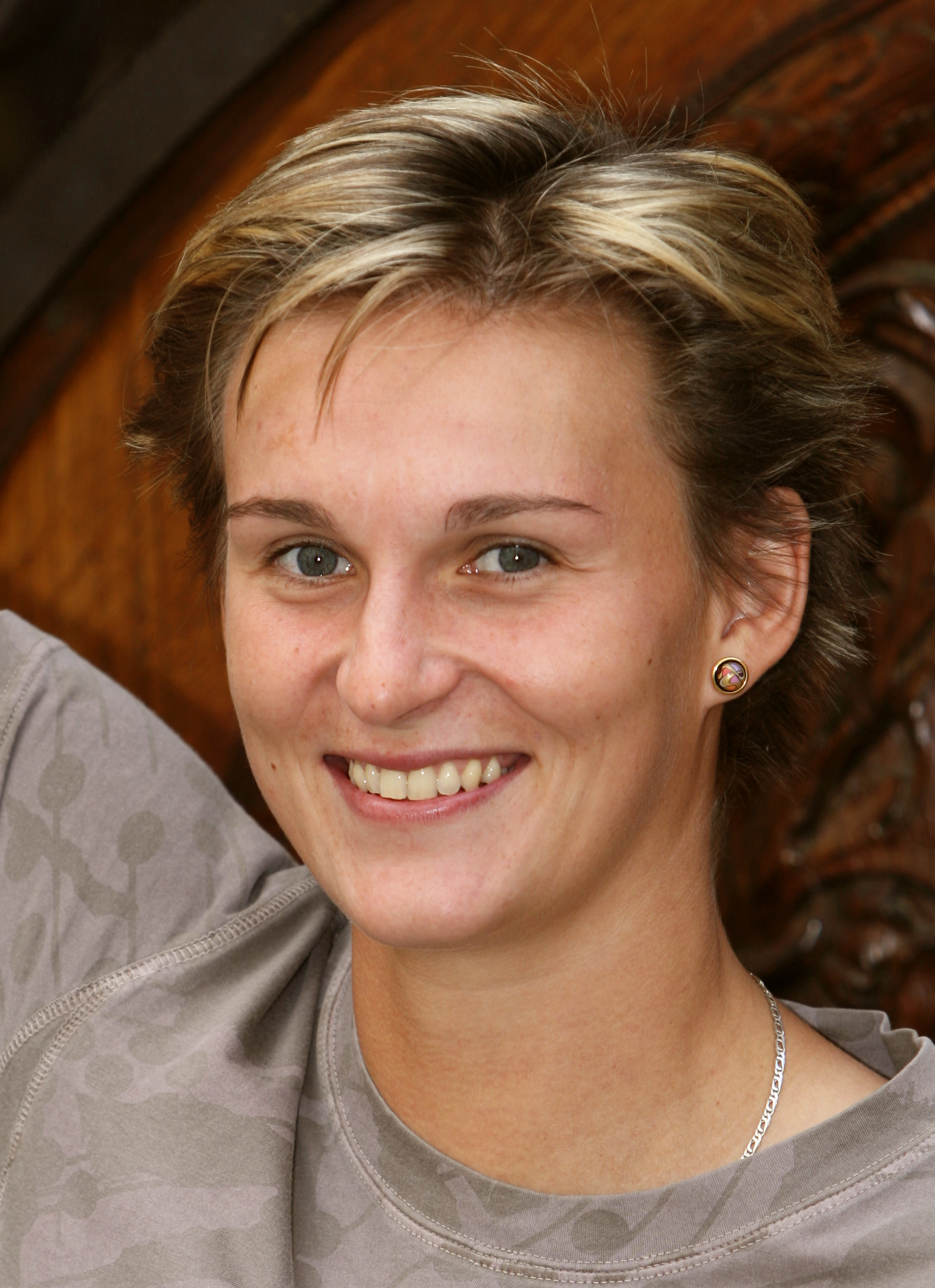
Barbora Špotáková broke her national record, then the European record, then finally the world record in the javelin throw.

Event	Record	Athlete	Nationality	Date	Meet	Place	Ref.	Video
100 m	10.73 (+2.0 m/s)	Christine Arron	France	19 August 1998	European Championships	Budapest, Hungary		
150 m (bend)	16.42+ (−0.4 m/s)	Dina Asher-Smith	Great Britain	28 August 2025	Weltklasse Zürich	Zurich, Switzerland		
200 m	21.63 (+0.2 m/s)	Dafne Schippers	Netherlands	28 August 2015	World Championships	Beijing, China		
300 m	34.14+	Marita Koch	East Germany	6 October 1985	World Cup	Canberra, Australia		
300 m	35.46	Kathy Cook	Great Britain	18 August 1984		London, United Kingdom		
300 m	35.46	Henriette Jæger	Norway	22 May 2024	Trond Mohn Games	Bergen, Norway		
400 m	47.60	Marita Koch	East Germany	6 October 1985	World Cup	Canberra, Australia		
600 m	1:22.85	Audrey Werro	Switzerland	23 June 2026	Biel/Bienne Athletics Abendmeeting	Biel, Switzerland		
800 m	1:53.28	Jarmila Kratochvílová	Czechoslovakia	26 July 1983		Munich, West Germany		
1000 m	2:28.98	Svetlana Masterkova	Russia	23 August 1996	Memorial Van Damme	Brussels, Belgium		
1500 m	3:51.95	Sifan Hassan	Netherlands	5 October 2019	World Championships	Doha, Qatar		
Mile run	4:12.33	Sifan Hassan	Netherlands	12 July 2019	Diamond League	Monaco, Monaco		
Mile (road)	4:22.74 Wo	Agathe Guillemot	France	19 September 2026	World Road Running Championships	Copenhagen, Denmark		
Mile (road)	4:13.8 a	Jemma Reekie	Great Britain	13 September 2026	New Balance Fifth Avenue Mile	New York City, United States		
2000 m	5:25.36	Sonia O'Sullivan	Ireland	8 July 1994		Edinburgh, United Kingdom		
3000 m	8:18.49	Sifan Hassan	Netherlands	30 June 2019	Prefontaine Classic	Stanford, United States		
Two miles	9:16.73	Konstanze Klosterhalfen	Germany	27 May 2022	Prefontaine Classic	Eugene, United States		
5000 m	14:13.42	Sifan Hassan	Netherlands	23 July 2023	Anniversary Games	London, United Kingdom		
5 km (road)	14:44 Wo	Sifan Hassan	Netherlands	17 February 2019	5 km Herculis	Monaco		
5 km (road)	14:33 Mx	Diane van Es	Netherlands	15 February 2026	Monaco Run	Monaco		
5 km (road)	14:32 Mx	Nadia Battocletti	Italy	3 May 2025	Tokyo : Speed : Race	Tokyo, Japan		
10,000 m	29:06.82	Sifan Hassan	Netherlands	6 June 2021	FBK Games	Hengelo, Netherlands		
10 km (road)	30:19 Wo	Eilish McColgan	Great Britain	22 May 2022	Great Manchester Run	Manchester, United Kingdom		
10 km (road)	29:51 Mx	Klara Lukan	Slovenia	18 April 2026	10 km en Ruta Villa de Laredo	Laredo, Spain		
15 km (road)	46:25+ Wo	Melat Yisak Kejeta	Germany	17 October 2020	World Half Marathon Championships	Gdynia, Poland		
15 km (road)	46:09+ Mx	Sifan Hassan	Netherlands	16 September 2018	Copenhagen Half Marathon	Copenhagen, Denmark		
10 miles (road)	50:43	Eilish McColgan	Great Britain	17 October 2021	Great South Run	Portsmouth, United Kingdom		
One hour	18930 m	Sifan Hassan	Netherlands	4 September 2020	Memorial van Damme	Brussels, Belgium		
20,000 m (track)	1:06:55.5	Rosa Mota	Portugal	14 May 1983		Lisbon, Portugal		
20 km (road)	1:02:04+ Wo	Melat Yisak Kejeta	Germany	17 October 2020	World Half Marathon Championships	Gdynia, Poland		
20 km (road)	1:01:56+ Mx	Sifan Hassan	Netherlands	16 September 2018	Copenhagen Half Marathon	Copenhagen, Denmark		
Half marathon	1:05:18 Wo	Melat Yisak Kejeta	Germany	17 October 2020	World Half Marathon Championships	Gdynia, Poland		
Half marathon	1:05:15 Mx	Sifan Hassan	Netherlands	16 September 2018	Copenhagen Half Marathon	Copenhagen, Denmark		
25,000 m (track)	1:28:22.60	Helena Javornik	Slovenia	19 July 2006		Maribor, Slovenia		
25 km (road)	1:18:06+ Mx	Sifan Hassan	Netherlands	8 October 2023	Chicago Marathon	Chicago, United States		
30,000 m (track)	1:47:05.6	Karolina Szabó	Hungary	22 April 1988		Budapest, Hungary		
30 km (road)	1:34:00+ Mx	Sifan Hassan	Netherlands	8 October 2023	Chicago Marathon	Chicago, United States		
Marathon	2:13:44 Mx	Sifan Hassan	Netherlands	8 October 2023	Chicago Marathon	Chicago, United States		
Marathon	2:17:42 Wo	Paula Radcliffe	Great Britain	17 April 2005	London Marathon	London, United Kingdom		
50 km	3:07:20	Alyson Dixon	Great Britain	1 September 2019	50 km World Championships	Brasov, Romania		
50 miles	5:55:41+	Valentina Liakhova	Russia	28 September 1996	100 km Track Trophy	Nantes, France		
100 km (road)	7:04:03 Mx	Floriane Hot	France	27 August 2022	IAU 100 km World Championships	Berlin, Germany		
100 miles (track)	14:25:45+	Edit Bérces	Hungary	21–22 September 2002	Verona 24 Hour	Verona, Italy		
100 miles (road)	12:37:04 Mx	Caitriona Jennings	Ireland	9 November 2025	Tunnel Hill Trail Races	Vienna, United States		
12 hours (road)	153.600 km	Satu Lipiäinen	Finland	20 May 2023	Ultra run	Kokkola, Finland		
24 hours (road)	278.621 km (Note: by IAU source; 278.622 by other sources)	Sarah Webster	Great Britain	19 October 2025	IAU 24 Hour World Championship	Albi, France		
48 hours (road)	436.371 km	Patrycja Bereznowska	Poland	30 May–1 June 2025	UltraPark Weekend 48 Hour	Pabianice, Poland		
100 m hurdles	12.21 (+0.7 m/s)	Yordanka Donkova	Bulgaria	20 August 1988		Stara Zagora, Bulgaria		
200 m hurdles (bend)	24.8 h (+0.4 m/s)	Yadisleidy Pedroso	Italy	6 April 2013		Caserta, Italy		
200 m hurdles (bend)	25.82 (+1.7 m/s)	Patricia Girard	France	22 September 1999		Nantes, France		
200 m hurdles (bend)	25.6 h (−0.7 m/s)	Patricia Girard	France	23 August 2001		Nantes, France		
200 m hurdles (straight)	25.05 (+1.0 m/s)	Meghan Beesley	Great Britain	17 May 2014	Manchester City Games	Manchester, United Kingdom		
300 m hurdles	36.86	Femke Bol	Netherlands	31 May 2022	Golden Spike Ostrava	Ostrava, Czech Republic		
400 m hurdles	50.95	Femke Bol	Netherlands	14 July 2024	Resisprint International	La Chaux-de-Fonds, Switzerland		
Mile steeplechase	4:51.87	Olivia Gürth	Germany	22 August 2025	Memorial Van Damme	Brussels, Belgium		
2000 m steeplechase	5:52.80	Gesa Felicitas Krause	Germany	1 September 2019	ISTAF Berlin	Berlin, Germany		
3000 m steeplechase	8:58.67	Alice Finot	France	6 August 2024	Olympic Games	Saint-Denis, France		
High jump	2.10 m	Yaroslava Mahuchikh	Ukraine	7 July 2024	Meeting de Paris	Paris, France		
Pole vault	5.06 m	Yelena Isinbayeva	Russia	28 August 2009	Weltklasse Zürich	Zürich, Switzerland		
Long jump	7.52 m (+1.4 m/s)	Galina Chistyakova	Soviet Union	11 June 1988		Leningrad, Soviet Union		
Triple jump	15.50 m (+0.9 m/s)	Inessa Kravets	Ukraine	10 August 1995	World Championships	Gothenburg, Sweden		
Shot put	22.63 m	Natalya Lisovskaya	Soviet Union	7 June 1987		Moscow, Soviet Union		
Discus throw	76.80 m	Gabriele Reinsch	East Germany	9 July 1988		Neubrandenburg, East Germany		
Hammer throw	82.98 m	Anita Włodarczyk	Poland	28 August 2016	Skolimowska Memorial	Warsaw, Poland		
Javelin throw	72.28 m (current design)	Barbora Špotáková	Czechoslovakia	13 September 2008	World Athletics Final	Stuttgart, Germany		
Javelin throw	80.00 m (old design)	Petra Felke	East Germany	9 September 1988		Potsdam, East Germany		
Heptathlon	7032 pts	Carolina Klüft	Sweden	25–26 August 2007	World Championships	Osaka, Japan		
Heptathlon	100m H (wind) / High jump / Shot put / 200m (wind) / Long jump (wind) / Javelin / 800m; 13.15 (+0.1 m/s) / 1.95 m / 14.81 m / 23.38 (+0.3 m/s) / 6.85 m (+1.0 m/s) / 47.98 m / 2:12.56							
Mile walk	6:10.09	Lyudmila Olyanovska	Ukraine	1 July 2026	Raiffeisen Austrian Open	Eisenstadt, Austria		
5000 m walk (track)	20:01.80	Eleonora Giorgi	Italy	18 May 2014	Italian Clubs League Meet	Misterbianco, Italy		
5 km walk (road)	19:46	Kjersti Plätzer	Norway	27 August 2006	Internationaler Geher-Cup	Hildesheim, Germany		
10,000 m walk (track)	41:56.23	Nadezhda Ryashkina	Soviet Union	24 July 1990		Seattle, United States		
10 km walk (road)	41:04	Yelena Nikolayeva	Russia	20 April 1996		Sochi, Russia		
20,000 m walk (track)	1:26:52.3	Olimpiada Ivanova	Russia	6 September 2001		Brisbane, Australia		
20 km walk (road)	1:25:02	Elena Lashmanova	Russia	11 August 2012	Olympic Games	London, United Kingdom		
20 km walk (road)	1:23:39	Elena Lashmanova	Russia	9 June 2018	Russian Race Walking Championships	Cheboksary, Russia		
20 km walk (road)	1:24:31	Elena Lashmanova	Russia	18 February 2019	Russian Winter Race Walking Championships	Sochi, Russia		
20 km walk (road)	1:24:47	Elmira Alembekova	Russia	27 February 2015	Russian Race Walking Championships	Sochi, Russia		
20 km walk (road)	1:24:50 X	Olimpiada Ivanova	Russia	4 March 2001		Adler, Russia		
20 km walk (road)	1:24:56	Olga Kaniskina	Russia	28 February 2009		Adler, Russia		
20 km walk (road)	1:24:58	Elena Lashmanova	Russia	25 June 2016	Russian Race Walking Championships	Cheboksary, Russia		
Half marathon walk (road)	1:30:06	María Pérez	Spain	15 August 2026	European Championships	Birmingham, United Kingdom		
35 km walk (road)	2:37:15	María Pérez	Spain	21 May 2023	European Race Walking Team Championships	Poděbrady, Czech Republic		
Marathon walk (road)	3:15:11	Sofia Fiorini	Italy	15 August 2026	European Championships	Birmingham, United Kingdom		
50 km walk (road)	4:04:50	Eleonora Giorgi	Italy	19 May 2019	European Cup	Alytus, Lithuania		
50 km walk (road)	3:57:08 # (Note: Not ratified by World Athletics due to lack of international judges.)	Klavdiya Afanasyeva	Russia	15 June 2019	Russian Race Walking Championships	Cheboksary, Russia		
4 × 100 m relay	41.37	Silke Gladisch; Sabine Rieger; Ingrid Auerswald; Marlies Göhr	East Germany	6 October 1985	World Cup	Canberra, Australia		
4 × 200 m relay	1:28.15	Marlies Göhr; Romy Schneider-Müller; Bärbel Eckert-Wöckel; Marita Koch	East Germany	9 August 1980		Jena, East Germany		
4 × 400 m relay	3:15.17	Tatyana Ledovskaya; Olga Nazarova; Mariya Pinigina; Olga Bryzgina	Soviet Union	1 October 1988	Olympic Games	Seoul, South Korea		
4 × 800 m relay	7:50.17	Nadezhda Olizarenko; Lyubov Gurina; Lyudmila Borisova; Irina Podyalovskaya	Soviet Union	5 August 1984		Moscow, Soviet Union		
Distance medley relay	10:45.32	Katarzyna Broniatowska (1200 m); Monika Szczęsna (400 m); Angelika Cichocka (800 m); Sofia Ennaoui (1600 m)	Poland	2 May 2015	IAAF World Relays	Nassau, Bahamas		
4 × 1500 m relay	17:19.09	Maria Lynch; Elaine Fitzgerald; Pauline Thom; Sonia O'Sullivan	Ireland	24 June 2000		London, United Kingdom		
Marathon road relay (Ekiden)	2:14:51	Liliya Shobukhova; Inga Abitova; Olesya Syreva; Lidiya Grigoryeva; Galina Bogomolova; Mariya Konovalova	Russia	23 November 2006	International Chiba Ekiden	Chiba, Japan		

=== Mixed ===
Event	Record	Athlete	Nationality	Date	Meet	Place	Ref.	Video
4 × 100 m relay	39.97	Jeremiah Azu; Dina Asher-Smith; Zharnel Hughes; Amy Hunt	Great Britain	16 August 2026	European Championships	Birmingham, United Kingdom		
4 × 400 m relay	3:07.43	Eugene Omalla; Lieke Klaver; Isaya Klein Ikkink; Femke Bol	Netherlands	3 August 2024	Olympic Games	Saint-Denis, France		
Shuttle hurdle relay	54.27	AK Sloboda, Varaždin; Roko Farkaš; Klara Koščak; Janko Kišak; Jana Koščak	Croatia	4 May 2024	Croatian Relay Championships	Zagreb, Croatia		

== Indoor ==
=== Men ===
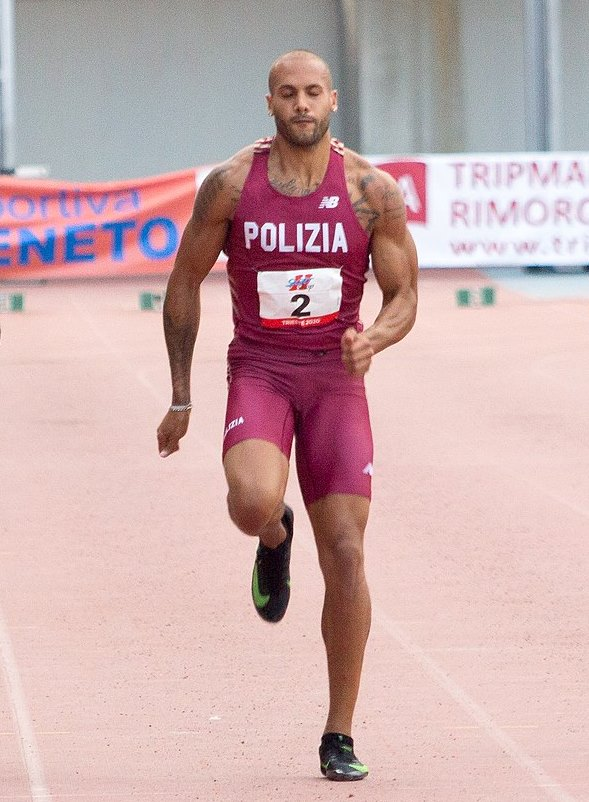
Marcell Jacobs ran 60 metres European record.

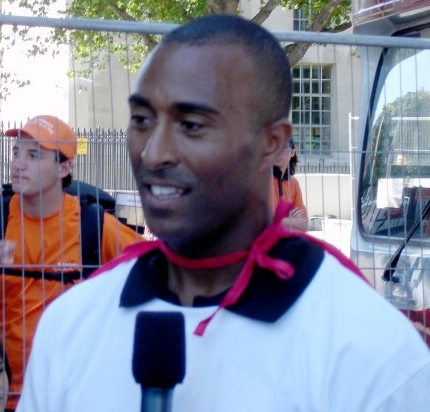
Colin Jackson's European and world record in the 60 metre hurdles remains unbeaten.

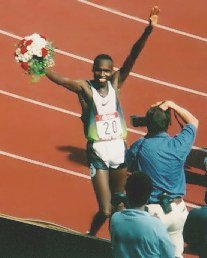
Kenyan-born Wilson Kipketer dominated the 800 metres records indoors and outdoors.

Event	Record	Athlete	Nationality	Date	Meet	Place	Ref.	Video
50 m
50 m	5.61	Manfred Kokot	East Germany	4 February 1973		East Berlin, East Germany		
50 m	5.61+	Jason Gardener	Great Britain	16 February 2000		Madrid, Spain		
50 m	5.59+	Jeremiah Azu	Great Britain	9 March 2025				
60 m	6.41	Marcell Jacobs	Italy	19 March 2022	World Championships	Belgrade, Serbia		
200 m	20.25	Linford Christie	Great Britain	19 February 1995	Meeting Pas de Calais	Liévin, France		
400 m	45.01	Attila Molnár	Hungary	3 February 2026	Czech Indoor Gala	Ostrava, Czech Republic		
600 m	1:14.92	Eliott Crestan	Belgium	25 January 2025	LBFA Allianz Championships	Louvain-la-Neuve, Belgium		
800 m	1:42.67	Wilson Kipketer	Denmark	9 March 1997	World Championships	Paris, France		
1000 m	2:14.52	Mohamed Attaoui	Spain	6 February 2026	Villa de Madrid Indoor Meeting	Madrid, Spain		
1500 m	3:29.63+	Jakob Ingebrigtsen	Norway	13 February 2025	Meeting Hauts-de-France Pas-de-Calais	Liévin, France		
Mile	3:45.14	Jakob Ingebrigtsen	Norway	13 February 2025	Meeting Hauts-de-France Pas-de-Calais	Liévin, France		
2000 m	4:52.41	Pieter Sisk	Belgium	24 January 2026	New Balance Indoor Grand Prix	Boston, United States		
3000 m	7:24.68	Mohamed Katir	Spain	15 February 2023	Meeting Hauts-de-France Pas-de-Calais	Liévin, France		
Two miles	8:00.67	Josh Kerr	Great Britain	11 February 2024	Millrose Games	New York City, United States		
5000 m	12:54.92	Jimmy Gressier	France	14 February 2025	BU David Hemery Valentine International	Boston, United States		
50 m hurdles	6.36+	Ladji Doucouré	France	26 February 2005	Meeting Hauts-de-France Pas-de-Calais	Liévin, France		
60 m hurdles	7.30	Colin Jackson	Great Britain	6 March 1994		Sindelfingen, Germany		
High jump	2.42 m	Carlo Thränhardt	West Germany	26 February 1988		West Berlin, West Germany		
High jump	2.42 m X	Ivan Ukhov	Russia	25 February 2014	Prague Indoor	Prague, Czech Republic		
Pole vault	6.31 m	Mondo Duplantis	Sweden	12 March 2026	Mondo Classic	Uppsala, Sweden		
Long jump	8.71 m	Sebastian Bayer	Germany	8 March 2009	European Championships	Turin, Italy		
Triple jump	17.92 m (2nd jump)	Teddy Tamgho	France	6 March 2011	European Championships	Paris, France		
Triple jump	17.92 m (4th jump)	Teddy Tamgho	France	6 March 2011	European Championships	Paris, France		
Shot put	22.55 m	Ulf Timmermann	East Germany	11 February 1989		Senftenberg, East Germany		
Heptathlon	6670 pts	Simon Ehammer	Switzerland	20–21 March 2026	World Championships	Toruń, Poland		
Heptathlon	60m / Long jump / Shot put / High jump / 60m H / Pole vault / 1000m; 6.69 / 8.15 m / 14.87 m / 2.02 m / 7.52 / 5.30 m / 2:41.04							
Mile walk	5:32.34	Perseus Karlström	Sweden	8 February 2025	USA 1 Mile Race Walking Championships	New York City, United States		
5000 m walk	18:07.08	Mikhail Shchennikov	Russia	14 February 1995	Russian Winter Meeting	Moscow, Russia		
5000 m walk	17:55.65	Francesco Fortunato	Italy	22 February 2025	Italian Championships	Ancona, Italy		
5000 m walk	17:54.48	Francesco Fortunato	Italy	28 February 2026	Italian Championships	Ancona, Italy		
4 × 200 m relay	1:22.11	Linford Christie; Darren Braithwaite; Ade Mafe; John Regis	Great Britain	3 March 1991		Glasgow, United Kingdom		
4 × 400 m relay	3:01.77	Karol Zalewski; Rafał Omelko; Łukasz Krawczuk; Jakub Krzewina	Poland	4 March 2018	World Championships	Birmingham, United Kingdom		
4 × 800 m relay	7:17.8 h	Valeriy Taratynov; Stanislav Meshcherskikh; Aleksey Taranov; Viktor Semyashkin	Soviet Union	14 March 1971		Sofia, Bulgaria		
4 × 800 m relay	7:15.77	Moskovskaya Region; Roman Trubetskoy; Dmitriy Bukreyev; Dmitriy Bogdanov; Yuriy Borzakovskiy	Russia	10 February 2008		Moscow, Russia		

=== Women ===
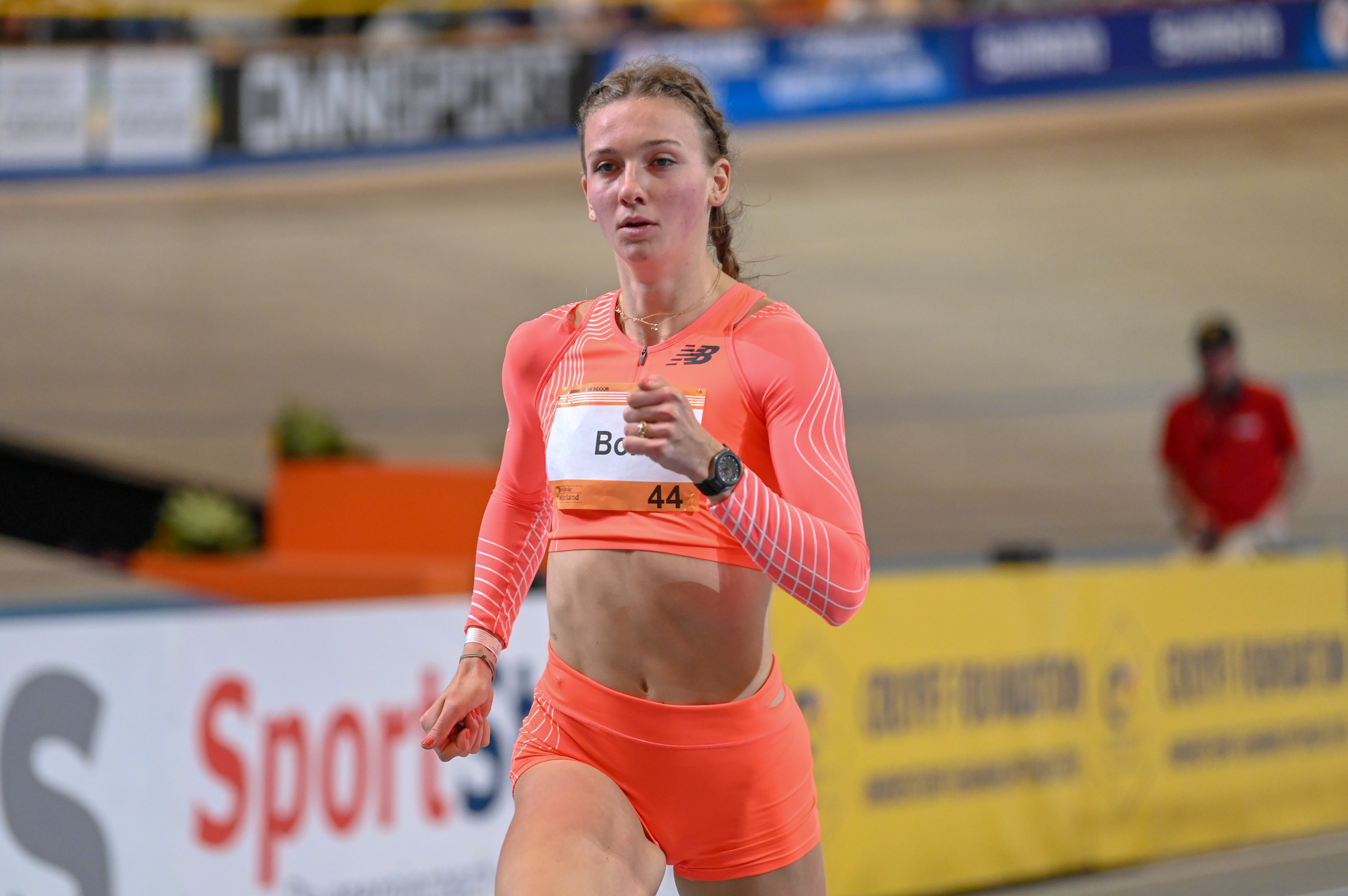
Femke Bol set the 400 metres world record in 2024.

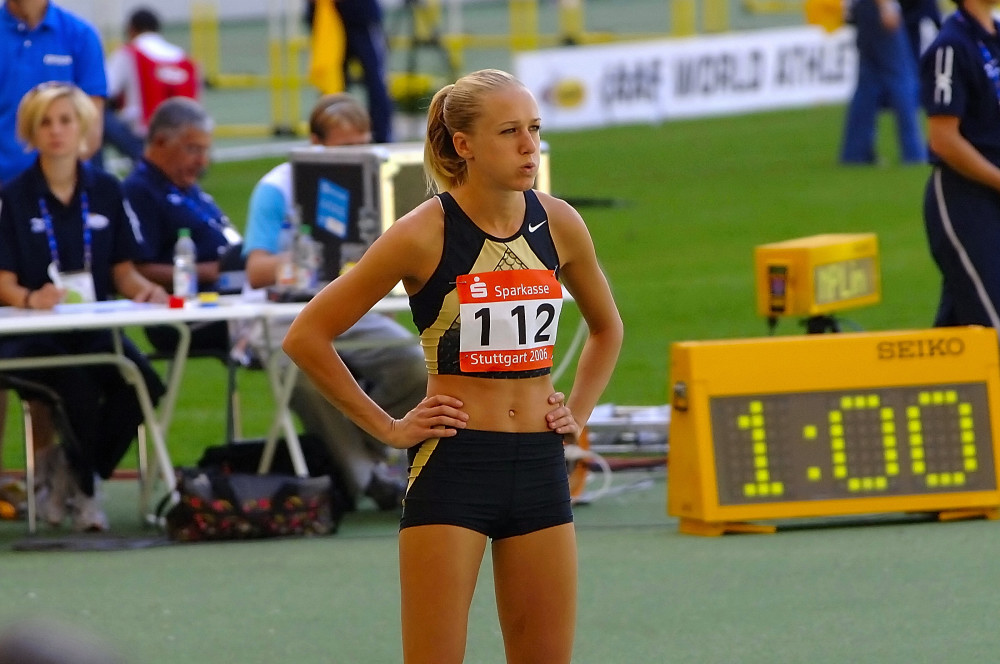
Kajsa Bergqvist broke an indoor high jump world record that had lasted over a decade.

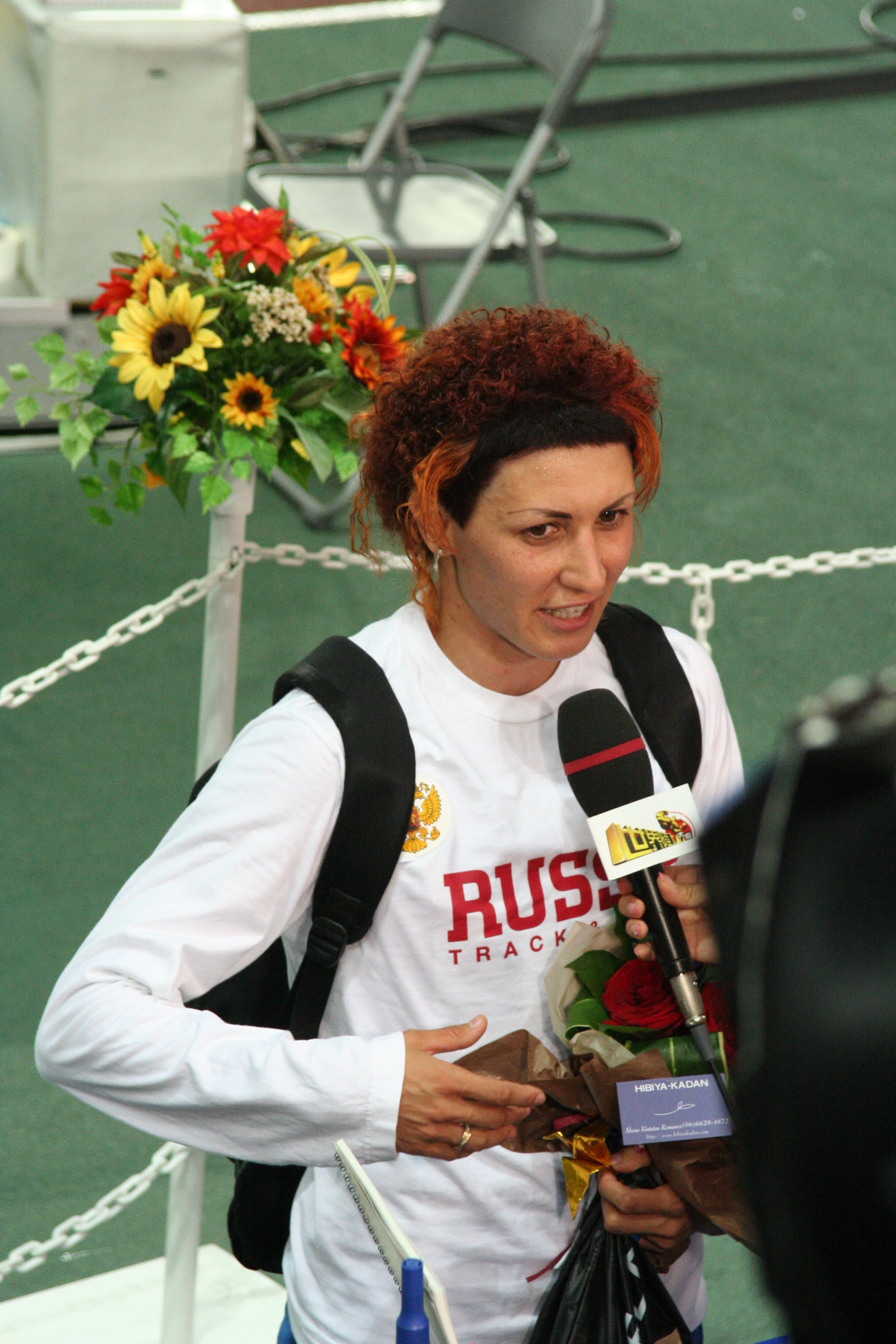
World indoor triple jump record holder Tatyana Lebedeva medalled in 3 Olympics.

Event	Record	Athlete	Nationality	Date	Meet	Place	Ref.	Video
50 m	5.96+	Irina Privalova	Russia	9 February 1995		Madrid, Spain		
60 m	6.92	Irina Privalova	Russia	11 February 1993		Madrid, Spain		
60 m	6.92	Irina Privalova	Russia	9 February 1995		Madrid, Spain		
200 m	22.10	Irina Privalova	Russia	19 February 1995	Meeting Pas de Calais	Liévin, France		
400 m	49.17	Femke Bol	Netherlands	2 March 2024	World Championships	Glasgow, United Kingdom		
800 m	1:55.82	Jolanda Čeplak	Slovenia	3 March 2002	European Championships	Vienna, Austria		
800 m	1:54.87	Keely Hodgkinson	Great Britain	19 February 2026	Meeting Hauts-de-France Pas-de-Calais	Liévin, France		
1000 m	2:31.93	Laura Muir	Great Britain	18 February 2017	Birmingham Indoor Grand Prix	Birmingham, United Kingdom		
1500 m	3:57.91	Abeba Aregawi	Sweden	6 February 2014	XL Galan	Stockholm, Sweden		
1500 m	3:57.71 X	Yelena Soboleva	Russia	9 March 2008	World Championships	Valencia, Spain		
Mile	4:17.14	Doina Melinte	Romania	9 February 1990		East Rutherford, United States		
2000 m	5:30.31	Salomé Afonso	Portugal	19 February 2026	Meeting Hauts-de-France Pas-de-Calais	Liévin, France		
3000 m	8:26.41	Laura Muir	Great Britain	4 February 2017	Weltklasse in Karlsruhe	Karlsruhe, Germany		
Two miles	9:04.84	Laura Muir	Great Britain	11 February 2024	Millrose Games	New York City, United States		
5000 m	14:30.79	Konstanze Klosterhalfen	Germany	27 February 2020	BU Last Chance Invitational	Boston, United States		
50 m hurdles	6.58	Cornelia Oschkenat	East Germany	20 February 1988		Berlin, East Germany		
60 m hurdles	7.67	Ditaji Kambundji	Switzerland	7 March 2025	European Championships	Apeldoorn, Netherlands		
60 m hurdles	7.66 X	Lyudmila Narozhilenko	Russia	4 March 1993		Seville, Spain		
60 m hurdles	7.63 X	Lyudmila Narozhilenko	Russia	4 March 1993		Seville, Spain		
High jump	2.08 m	Kajsa Bergqvist	Sweden	4 February 2006	Hochsprung mit Musik	Arnstadt, Germany		
Pole vault	5.01 m	Yelena Isinbayeva	Russia	23 February 2012	XL Galan	Stockholm, Sweden		
Long jump	7.37 m	Heike Drechsler	East Germany	13 February 1988		Vienna, Austria		
Triple jump	15.36 m	Tatyana Lebedeva	Russia	6 March 2004	World Championships	Budapest, Hungary		
Shot put	22.50 m	Helena Fibingerová	Czechoslovakia	19 February 1977		Jablonec, Czechoslovakia		
Pentathlon	5055 pts	Nafissatou Thiam	Belgium	3 March 2023	European Championships	Istanbul, Turkey		
Pentathlon	60m H / High jump / Shot put / Long jump / 800m; 8.23 / 1.92 m / 15.54 m / 6.59 m / 2:13.60							
Mile walk	6:16.72 WB	Sada Eidikytė	Soviet Union	24 February 1990		Kaunas, Soviet Union		
3000 m walk	11:40.33	Claudia Stef	Romania	30 January 1999		Bucharest, Romania		
3000 m walk	11:35.34 (Note: No international judges.)	Gillian O'Sullivan	Ireland	15 February 2003		Belfast, United Kingdom		
Two miles walk	13:11.88 WB	Ileana Salvador	Italy	14 February 1990		Genoa, Italy		
5000 m walk	19:53.61 WB	Lyudmyla Olyanovska	Ukraine	27 February 2026	Ukrainian Championships	Kyiv, Ukraine		
10,000 m walk	43:13.00 WB	Viktoriya Bartash	Belarus	14 February 2025	Belarusian Championships	Mogilev, Belarus		
4 × 200 m relay	1:32.41	Yekaterina Kondratyeva; Irina Khabarova; Yuliya Pechonkina; Yuliya Gushchina	Russia	29 January 2005	Aviva International Match	Glasgow, United Kingdom		
4 × 400 m relay	3:23.37	Yuliya Gushchina; Olga Kotlyarova; Olga Zaytseva; Olesya Krasnomovets	Russia	28 January 2006	Aviva International Match	Glasgow, United Kingdom		
4 × 800 m relay	8:06.24	Team Moscow; Aleksandra Bulanova; Yekaterina Martynova; Yelena Kofanova; Anna Balakshina	Russia	18 February 2011	Russian Championships	Moscow, Russia		

=== Mixed ===
Event	Record	Athlete	Nationality	Date	Meet	Place	Ref.
4 × 400 m relay	3:15.63	Nick Smidt; Eveline Saalberg; Tony van Diepen; Femke Bol	Netherlands	6 March 2025	European Championships	Apeldoorn, Netherlands	

== European best (outdoor) for non-standard events ==
=== Men ===
Event	Record	Athlete	Nationality	Date	Meet	Place	Ref.
100 y	9.30 (+1.6 m/s)	Linford Christie	Great Britain	8 July 1994		Edinburgh, Great Britain	
150 m (bend)	14.93+ (+0.3 m/s)	John Regis	Great Britain	20 August 1993	World Championships	Stuttgart, Germany	
150 m (bend)	14.8 h	Pietro Mennea	Italy	3 September 1979		Cassino, Italy	
200 m (straight)	20.48 (−0.6 m/s)	Solomon Bockarie	Netherlands	4 September 2016	Urban Memorial Van Damme	Brussels, Belgium	
300 m	31.56	Douglas Walker	Great Britain	19 July 1998		Gateshead, United Kingdom	
500 m (track)	1:00.08	Donato Sabia	Italy	26 May 1984		Busto Arsizio, Italy	
500 m (road)	57.91	Mark English	Ireland	10 September 2016	Great North CityGames	Newcastle, United Kingdom	
600 m	1:13.21	Pierre-Ambroise Bosse	France	5 June 2016	British Grand Prix	Birmingham, United Kingdom	
200 m hurdles (bend)	22.55 WB	Laurent Ottoz	Italy	31 May 1995		Milan, Italy	
200 m hurdles (bend)	22.5 h	Martin Lauer	West Germany	7 July 1959		Zürich, Switzerland	
100,000 m (track)	6:10:20	Don Ritchie	Great Britain	28 October 1978		London, United Kingdom	
200 m hurdles (straight)	22.10 (+2.0 m/s) WB	Andy Turner	Great Britain	15 May 2011	Manchester City Games	Manchester, United Kingdom	
1500 m walk (track)	5:12.0+ WB	Antanas Grigaliūnas	Lithuania	12 May 1990		Vilnius, Lithuania	
Mile walk (track)	5:31.08 WB	Tom Bosworth	Great Britain	9 July 2017	London Grand Prix	London, United Kingdom	
50-mile walk (road)	7:44:47.2 WB	Shaul Ladany	Israel	1972		New Jersey, United States	
4 × mile relay	15:49.08	Eamonn Coghlan; Ray Flynn; Frank O'Mara; Marcus O'Sullivan	Ireland	17 August 1985		Dublin, Ireland	

=== Women ===
Event	Record	Athlete	Nationality	Date	Meet	Place	Ref.	Video
100 y	10.45+ (+1.5 m/s)	Yevgeniya Polyakova	Russia	27 May 2010	Golden Spike Ostrava	Ostrava, Czech Republic		
150 m (straight)	16.57 (+1.1 m/s)	Desiree Henry	Great Britain	10 September 2016	Great North CityGames	Newcastle, United Kingdom		
200 m (straight)	23.29 (+0.2 m/s)	Emily Freeman	Great Britain	16 May 2010	Manchester City Games	Manchester, United Kingdom		
500 m	1:05.9 WB	Tatana Kocembova	Czechoslovakia	2 August 1984		Ostrava, Czechoslovakia		
Decathlon	8358 pts WB	Austra Skujytė	Lithuania	14–15 April 2005		Columbia, United States		
Decathlon	100m (wind) / Discus / Pole vault / Javelin / 400m / 100m H (wind) / Long jump (wind) / Shot put / High jump / 1500m; 12.49 / 46.19 m / 3.10 m / 48.78 m / 57.19 / 14.22 / 6.12 m / 16.42 m / 1.78 m / 5:15.86							
3000 m walk (track)	11:48.24 WB	Ileana Salvador	Italy	29 August 1993		Padua, Italy		

== European best (indoor) for non-standard events ==
=== Men ===
Event	Record	Athlete	Nationality	Date	Meet	Place	Ref.	Video
55 m	6.13 A	Frank Emmelmann	East Germany	3 February 1984		Albuquerque, United States		
150 m	15.53 OT	Rytis Sakalauskas	Lithuania	11 February 2010	Botnia Games	Korsholm, Finland		
300 m	32.15	Pavel Maslák	Czech Republic	9 February 2014	Indoor Flanders Meeting	Ghent, Belgium		
500 m	1:00.36	Pavel Maslák	Czech Republic	25 February 2014	Prague Indoor	Prague, Czech Republic		
2000 m	4:52.90	Sergio Sánchez	Spain	23 January 2010		Oviedo, Spain		
10,000 m	28:12.4 h	Emiel Puttemans	Belgium	22 February 1975		Pantin, France		
55 m hurdles	7.01	Stéphane Caristan	France	27 February 1987	USA Championships	New York City, United States		
300 m hurdles	34.26 OT ^{[WB]}	Karsten Warholm	Norway	10 February 2018	Avoimet Pirkanmaan	Tampere, Finland		
400 m hurdles	50.21	Richard Yates	Great Britain	19 February 2011	Aviva Indoor Grand Prix	Birmingham, United Kingdom		
2000 m steeplechase	5:21.56	Andrei Farnosov	Russia	14 February 2010	Indoor Flanders Meeting	Ghent, Belgium		
3000 m steeplechase	8:17.46 ^{[WB]}	Aleksandr Zagoruyko	Soviet Union	21 February 1982		Moscow, Soviet Union		
Weight throw	25.68 m	Libor Charfreitag	Slovakia	5 March 2005		Sterling, United States		
Discus throw	69.51 m ^{[WB]}	Gerd Kanter	Estonia	22 March 2009	World Record Indoor Challenge	Växjö, Sweden		
Javelin throw	85.78 m (current design)	Matti Närhi	Finland	3 March 1996		Kajaani, Finland		
3000 m walk	10:30.28 ^{[WB]}	Tom Bosworth	Great Britain	25 February 2018	Glasgow Grand Prix	Glasgow, United Kingdom		
Two miles walk	11:54.50 ^{[WB]}	Valdas Kazlauskas	Soviet Union	24 February 1990		Kaunas, Soviet Union		
15,000 m walk	1:00:03.9 ^{[WB]}	Valdas Kazlauskas	Soviet Union	24 January 1987		Kaunas, Soviet Union		
20,000 m walk	1:20:40.0 OT ^{[WB]}	Ronald Weigel	East Germany	27 January 1980		Senftenberg, East Germany		

=== Women ===
Event	Record	Athlete	Nationality	Date	Meet	Place	Ref.	Video
55 m	6.62 (Note: Converted from a time for the slightly shorter 60 yards by adding 0.01)	Marlies Göhr	East Germany	28 February 1986		New York City, United States		
100 y	10.67	Heather Hunte	Great Britain	17 February 1978		Senftenberg, East Germany		
100 m	11.15 WB	Marita Koch	East Germany	12 January 1980		East Berlin, East Germany		
300 m	35.45 WB	Irina Privalova	Russia	17 January 1993		Moscow, Russia		
500 m	1:05.63 WB	Femke Bol	Netherlands	4 February 2023	New Balance Indoor Grand Prix	Boston, United States		
600 m	1:23.41 WB	Keely Hodgkinson	Great Britain	28 January 2023	Manchester World Indoor Tour	Manchester, United Kingdom		
2000 m	5:30.53	Gabriela Szabo	Romania	8 March 1998		Sindelfingen, Germany		
Marathon	2:42:30	Laura Manninen	Finland	25 March 2017	The Armory Indoor Marathon	New York City, United States		
55 m hurdles	7.37	Cornelia Oschkenat	East Germany	27 February 1987	USA Championships	New York City, United States		
300 m hurdles	40.09 OT WB	Stine Tomb	Norway	5 February 2011	Finland-Sweden-Norway Indoor Match	Tampere, Finland		
400 m hurdles	56.66	Sara Slott Petersen	Denmark	18 February 2012	Meeting National	Val-de-Reuil, France		
2000 m steeplechase	5:47.79	Maruša Mišmaš	Slovenia	19 February 2020	Meeting Hauts de France Pas de Calais	Liévin, France		
3000 m steeplechase	9:07.00 WB	Tatyana Petrova	Russia	17 February 2006		Moscow, Russia		
3000 m steeplechase	9:54.2 WB (Note: This is the fastest indoor steeplechase with a water-jump.)	Marcela Lustigova	Czech Republic	11 February 2010	Botnia Games	Korsholm, Finland		
Weight throw	23.73 m	Ida Storm	Sweden	15 February 2017		Malmö, Sweden		
Discus throw	65.23 m Mx WB	Shanice Craft	Germany	10 February 2023	ISTAF Indoor	Berlin, Germany		
Javelin throw	57.75 m (current design)	Anna Wessman	Sweden	10 March 2012	World Indoor Throwing	Växjö, Sweden		
Javelin throw	64.68 m (old design)	Mikaela Ingberg	Finland	5 March 1995		Kajaani, Finland		
4 × 100 m relay	44.39	Anne-Kathrin Elbe; Anne Möllinger; Cathleen Tschirch; Marion Wagner	Germany	31 January 2010	BW-Bank Meeting	Karlsruhe, Germany		
