= IAU European 24 Hour Championships =

- Sport: 24-hour run
- Founded: 1992

The IAU European 24 Hour Championships is a biennial long-distance running competition in the 24-hour run for athletes from Europe. Organised by the International Association of Ultrarunners, it was first held in 1992 as an annual competition known as the IAU European 24 Hours Challenge. The establishment of the IAU 24 Hour World Championship in 2003 saw the European event staged within the global race until the competitions were each recast as separate, biennial championships, with the world event in odd years and the European one in even years. The competition is typically a road running one, though the championships was contested on the track in 1999.

== Editions ==
Edition held within the IAU 24 Hour World Championship

Ed.	Year	City	Country	Dates	No. of nations	No. of athletes
1	1992	Apeldoorn	Netherlands	29–30 May		
2	1993	Basel	Switzerland	1–2 May		
3	1994	Szeged	Hungary	21–22 May		
4	1996	Courçon	France	21–22 September		
5	1997	Basel	Switzerland	3–4 May		
6	1998	Fleurbaix-Marquette	France	29–30 August		
7	1999	San Giovanni Lupatoto	Italy	25–26 September		
8	2000	Uden	Netherlands	20–21 October		
9	2001	Apeldoorn	Netherlands	25–26 May		
10	2002	Gravigny	France	7–8 September		
11	2003	Uden	Netherlands	11–12 October		
12	2004	Brno	Czech Republic	23–24 October		
13	2005	Wörschach	Austria	16–17 July		
14	2006	Verona	Italy	23–24 September		
15	2007	Madrid	Spain	5–6 May		
16	2009	Bergamo	Italy	2–3 May		
17	2010	Brive-la-Gaillarde	France	13–14 May		
18	2012	Katowice	Poland	9–10 September		
19	2013	Steenbergen	Netherlands	11–12 May		
20	2015	Turin	Italy	11–12 April		
21	2016	Albi	France	22–23 October		
22	2018	Timișoara	Romania	26–27 May		
23	2020	Cancelled				
24	2022	Verona	Italy	17–18 September		

== Medallists ==
=== Men's individual ===
Year	Gold		Silver		Bronze	
1992	Helmut Schieke (GER)	250.698	Peter Samulski (GER)	241.583	Valery Klement (GER)	237.326
1993	Helmut Dreyer (GER)	259.265	Milan Tuhovcak (CZE)	257.965	Gennadiy Groshev (RUS)	247.900
1994	Janos Bogar (HUN)	261.122	Jean-Pierre Guyomarch (FRA)	254.018	Valery Klement (GER)	252.110
1996	Ferenc Györi (HUN)	259.922	Michael Maier (GER)	250.999	Jean-Pierre Guyomarch (FRA)	240.614
1997	Vladimir Tivikov (RUS)	249.039	Serge Flohic (FRA)	245.221	Marcel Foucat (FRA)	242.200
1998	Lucien Taelman (BEL)	267.626	Tomas Rusek (CZE)	263.144	Michael Maier (GER)	259.067
1999	Yiannis Kouros (GRE)	262.324	Lubomir Hrmo (SVK)	249.239	Alain Prual (FRA)	234.823
2000	Lubomir Hrmo (SVK)	259.273	Andrey Kazantsev (RUS)	257.760	Alain Prual (FRA)	255.510
2001	Paul Beckers (BEL)	260.559	Jens Lukas (GER)	258.907	Vladimir Kurbatov (RUS)	252.801
2002	Jens Lukas (GER)	267.294	Alain Prual (FRA)	264.796	Jean-Pierre Guyomarch (FRA)	255.726
2003	Paul Beckers (BEL)	270.087	Etienne van Acker (BEL)	264.967	Andrei Kazantsev (RUS)	258.037
2004	Lubomir Hrmo (SVK)	259.064	Mohamed Magroun (FRA)	257.881	Vladimir Bychkov (RUS)	248.595
2005	Anatolii Kruglikov (RUS)	268.065	Ewald Eder (AUT)	263.810	Jens Lukas (GER)	256.369
2006	Vladimir Bychkov (RUS)	254.774	Geert Stynen (BEL)	248.642	Antonio Mammoli (ITA)	248.440
2007	Anatolii Kruglikov (RUS)	257.358	Vladimir Bychkov (RUS)	251.631	Jose Luis Posado Perez (ESP)	247.937
2009	Henrik Olson (SWE)	257.042	Ralf Weis (GER)	244.492	Vladimir Bychkov (RUS)	240.605
2010	Ivan Cudin (ITA)	263.841	Vladimir Bychkov (RUS)	258.534	Fabien Hoblea (FRA)	256.256
2012	Florian Reuss (GER)	261.718	Ludovic Dilmi (FRA)	258.819	Piotr Sawicki (POL)	254.093
2013	Florian Reuss (GER)	259.939	Anatolii Kruglikov (RUS)	257.040	Timur Ponomarev (RUS)	256.666
2015	Florian Reuss (GER)	263.899	Pawel Szynal (POL)	261.181	Robbie Britton (GBR)	261.140
2016	Dan Lawson (GBR)	261.843	Ondrej Velicka (CZE)	258.661	Stephan Ruel (FRA)	257.296
2018	Andrzej Radzikowski (POL)	265.419	Stephane Ruel (FRA)	263.540	Aleksandr Sorokin (LTU)	260.991
2022	Aleksandr Sorokin (LTU)	319.614	Andrzej Piotrowski (POL)	301.859	Marco Visintini (ITA)	288.438

=== Men's team ===
Year	Gold		Silver		Bronze	
1993	Germany	732.560	Russia	699.397	Czech Republic	679.637
1994	France	712.895	Russia	692.754	Germany	691.609
1996	Germany	712.477	France	703.248	Belgium	679.699
1997	France	726.933	Russia	721.747	Slovakia	655.218
1998	France	746.897	Germany	734.429	Czech Republic	714.714
2000	France	752.642	Russia	731.880	United Kingdom	667.688
2001	Russia	730.208	Germany	718.446	France	695.814
2002	France	771.278	Germany	719.796	Russia	662.573
2003	Belgium	791.901	Russia	739.569	France	715.792
2004	France	745.725	Russia	704.876	Slovakia	672.143
2005	Russia	731.229	Italy	725.897	Austria	722.476
2009	Russia	693.445	Germany	689.111	Sweden	684.333
2010	Italy	758.932	France	751.835	United Kingdom	742.777
2012	Germany	759.457	France	756.710	Poland	741.267
2013	Germany	752.007	Russia	748.162	Italy	715.739
2015	United Kingdom	770.777	Germany	745.075	France	736.237
2016	France	763.291	United Kingdom	743.269	Germany	720.006
2018	France	754.625	United Kingdom	735.155	Germany	725.963
2022	Poland	825.526	Lithuania	817.916	Spain	800.017

=== Women's individual ===
Year	Gold		Silver		Bronze	
1992	Sigrid Lomsky (GER)	231.008	Helga Backhaus (GER)	224.164	Anna Dyck (GER)	213.332
1993	Sigrid Lomsky (GER)	243.657	Helga Backhaus (GER)	223.647	Anna Dyck (GER)	214.980
1994	Sigrid Lomsky (GER)	231.482	Rimma Paitseva (RUS)	202.276	Gisela Fricke (GER)	201.850
1996	Marie Bertrand-Mayeras (FRA)	231.049	Elena Sidorenkova (RUS)	227.287	Eleanor Robinson (GBR)	223.129
1997	Irina Reutovich (RUS)	236.284	Elena Sidorenkova (RUS)	230.862	Marie Bertrand-Mayeras (FRA)	223.720
1998	Marie Bertrand-Mayeras (FRA)	226.457	Colette Musy (FRA)	223.378	Christiane Lecerf (FRA)	220.966
1999	Irina Reutovich (RUS)	223.763	Helga Backhaus (GER)	209.678	Rimma Paitseva (RUS)	202.082
2000	Irina Reutovich (RUS)	225.418	Joelle Semur (FRA)	219.260	Rimma Paitseva (RUS)	216.299
2001	Irina Reutovich (RUS)	226.635	Irina Koval (RUS)	222.650	Helga Backhaus (GER)	212.692
2002	Edit Berces (HUN)	232.284	Irina Reutovich (RUS)	226.825	Irina Koval (RUS)	225.036
2003	Irina Reutovich (RUS)	237.052	Galina Eremina (RUS)	232.050	Joelle Semur (FRA)	227.279
2004	Galina Eremina (RUS)	235.013	Edit Berces (HUN)	217.665	Irina Reutovich (RUS)	214.633
2005	Lyudmila Kalinina (RUS)	242.228	Galina Eremina (RUS)	239.874	Irina Koval (RUS)	227.469
2006	Irina Koval (RUS)	229.452	Michaela Dimitriadu (CZE)	225.228	Edit Berces (HUN)	211.218
2007	Lyudmila Kalinina (RUS)	233.307	Monica Casiraghi (ITA)	217.989	Rosario Munoz Olivares (ESP)	210.721
2009	Anne-Cecile Fontaine (FRA)	243.644	Brigitte Bec (FRA)	234.977	Monica Casiraghi (ITA)	223.848
2010	Anne-Cecile Fontaine (FRA)	239.797	Monica Casiraghi (ITA)	231.390	Julia Alter (GER)	230.258
2012	Michaela Dimitriadu (CZE)	244.232	Emily Gelder (GBR)	238.875	Cecile Nisson (FRA)	234.524
2013	Anne-Marie Vernet (FRA)	229.393	Cecile Nisson (FRA)	227.618	Sharon Law (GBR)	226.107
2015	Maria Jannson (SWE)	238.964	Patrycja Bereznowska (POL)	233.395	Annika Nilrud (SWE)	230.054
2016	Maria Jannson (SWE)	250.647	Patrycja Bereznowska (POL)	241.633	Agata Matejczuk (POL)	232.285
2018	Patrycja Bereznowska (POL)	243.355	Stine Rex (DEN)	241.921	Małgorzata Pazda-Pozorska (POL)	240.697
2022	Patrycja Bereznowska (POL)	256.250	Stéphanie Gicquel (FRA)	253.581	Małgorzata Pazda-Pozorska (POL)	251.806

=== Women's team ===
Year	Gold		Silver		Bronze	
1993	Germany	682.284	United Kingdom	518.720	Switzerland	465.755
1994	Germany	609.819	Russia	574.164	United Kingdom	546.978
1996	France	641.802	United Kingdom	627.418	Russia	597.636
1997	Russia	677.640	France	617.499	United Kingdom	574.565
1998	France	670.801	United Kingdom	591.053	Germany	586.886
2000	Russia	647.492	Germany	608.129	France	608.040
2001	Russia	639.317	Germany	616.118	France	569.184
2002	Russia	668.143	France	629.706	Hungary	605.771
2003	Russia	684.858	France	649.303	Germany	594.304
2004	Russia	661.558	France	598.788	Italy	571.513
2005	Russia	709.573	France	577.841	Czech Republic	552.058
2007	Italy	603.192	Spain	557.418	Hungary	505.902
2009	France	684.078	Italy	626.386	Germany	598.365
2010	France	685.800	Italy	658.112	Finland	605.143
2012	France	666.503	United Kingdom	666.461	Germany	651.221
2013	France	670.698	United Kingdom	658.357	Germany	651.117
2015	Sweden	684.981	Poland	678.468	United Kingdom	668.305
2016	Poland	701.429	Sweden	691.656	France	655.332
2018	Poland	720.454	Germany	656.245	United Kingdom	645.069
2022	Poland	754.822	France	731.729	Germany	719.584
