= Al Howie =

Canadian long-distance runner

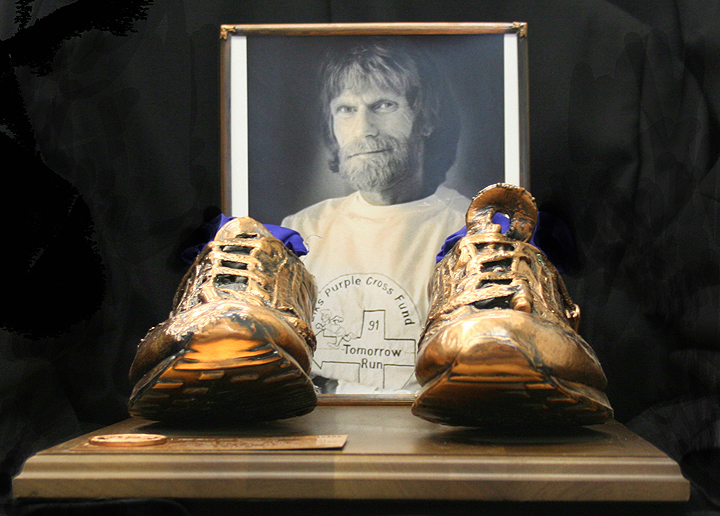
A plaque commemorating Al's run across Canada.

Arthur "Al" Howie (September 16, 1945 – June 21, 2016) was a Canadian long-distance runner who won more than fifty marathons, ultramarathons, and multiday races in over two decades, including the 1991 Trans Canada Highway run (7295 kilometers) in the record time of 72 days and 10 hours. A brass plaque on Victoria's Mile Zero marker commemorates this athletic event for which he raised $750,000 for a fund for children with special needs. Two weeks after running across Canada, he won the Sri Chinmoy 1300 Miler in New York, improving on his own world record time. Both the Trans Canada run and the 1,300-mile (2,100 km) race qualified for the Guinness Book of Records. He lived in Duncan, B.C., from 2005 until his death in 2016, having been receiving treatment for Diabetes I. The City of Duncan awarded him the Perpetual Trophy for Excellence and Sportsmanship in December 2007, and in 2014 he was inducted into The Greater Victoria Sports Hall of Fame.

== Biography ==
=== The early years ===
Arthur "Al" Howie was born in 1945 in Saltcoats, Ayrshire. He attended the local schools and completed his secondary education. He married an American living in Britain, and a son, Gabe was born in 1968. After his divorce, Howie emigrated to Canada with his son and settled in Toronto. A daughter, Dana, was born in 1976. He quit smoking in January 1974 and started running as a hobby "to get rid of the aggravation from quitting a three-pack-a-day smoking habit." Howie moved to Victoria, B. C. in 1978 and began training for the long runs, including training runs between cities. He married Claudia Cole in 1986; they separated in 2000.

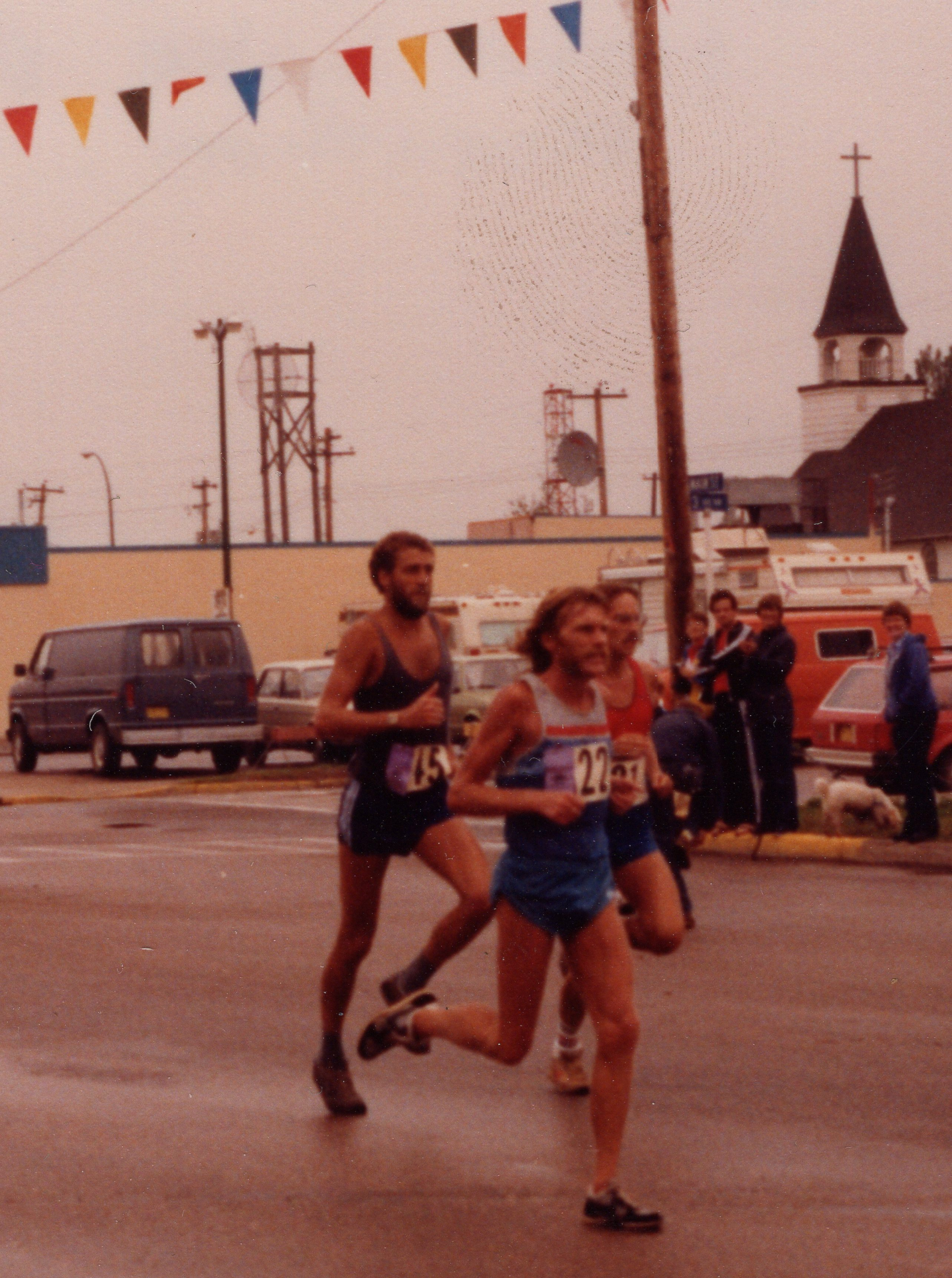
Al Howie (in foreground) taking the lead to win his first marathon. 1982 Slave Lake Marathon, Alberta, Canada.

=== The "Prince George to Boston" Marathon: 1979 ===
The 1979 Prince George marathon, which featured disabled athletes alongside able-bodied competitors, brought together Howie, Rick Hansen and Terry Fox, all making their marathon debuts. All three were little-known competitors at the time. Howie had run from Victoria to Prince George to take part in the race, which promised the winner an all-expense-paid trip to the Boston Marathon. Hansen won, with Howie placing third, and Fox finishing last. Howie was inspired by Fox's 'eagerness to excel' and decided to run across Canada in aid of cancer research.

=== From Marathons to Ultramarathons to Multiday Races: 1980-1988 ===
Howie began to train obsessively for longer and longer runs. He won his age group in his first full-length (42.195 kilometres (26.219 mi)) marathon in 1980 in Edmonton. He then ran 806 miles (1,297 kilometers) from Edmonton to Victoria to enter the first annual Royal Victoria Marathon in which he placed fourteenth overall. Howie had shipped his gear from point to point on buses and run to his destination.

In May, 1981, Howie set the Canadian and North American record for the annual Self-Transcendence 24 Hour Race in Ottawa, and the following year improved on his distance by covering 150 miles and 395 yards in that continuous day and night (no sleeping) race. He won the annual 24-hour race in Ottawa five years in a row, in 1981, 1982, 1983, 1984, and 1985. In 1983, he ran from Winnipeg to Ottawa prior to participating in the 24-hour event. In 1986 while he was recuperating from a bout with cancer, he ran his worst 24-hour ultra in which he covered about 100 kilometers. He was back in top form for the 1987 Canadian 24-hour Championship in Ottawa, winning the event for the sixth time.

A cancerous brain tumour behind his ear appeared in the summer of 1985 forcing temporary withdrawal from all races. Adopting a macrobiotic diet, Howie had recovered sufficiently by spring of the following year to run 1200 kilometers from Victoria to Fernie in southern B.C. where some of his treatment had taken place.

In 1987 he broke the record for the longest, continual run, completing 360 miles (580 kilometers) in 1422 laps around the University of Victoria's Centennial Stadium in 104.5 hours. That's four non-stop days and nights to promote the forthcoming Commonwealth Games. In 1988, he set a record in the 880-mile (1,420 km) Land's End to John o' Groats, running the length of Britain in 11 days. A few months later, he ran from England through France to the island of Sardinia in Italy where he participated in the final running of the Super-Marathon Nuraghe.

=== The Peak Years: 1989 to 1991 ===
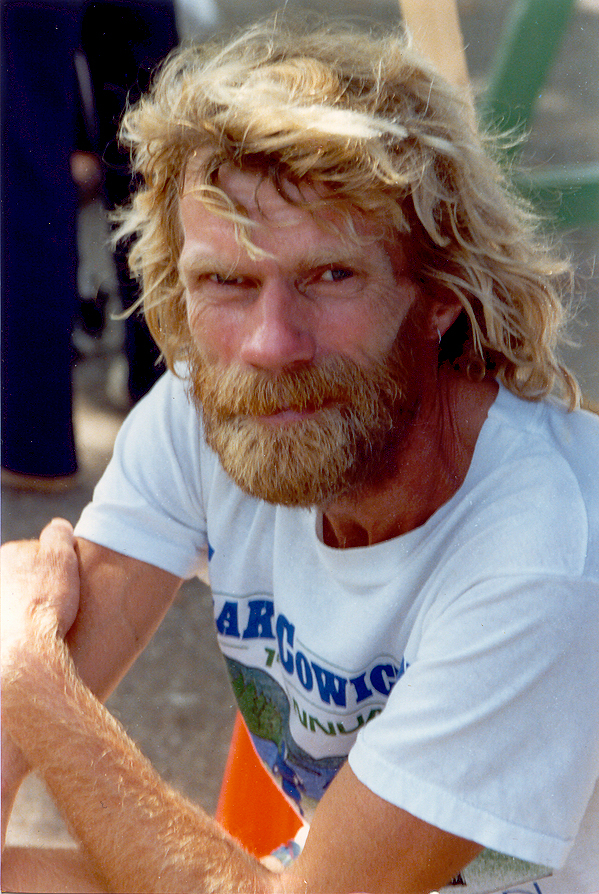
Howie after 1,300-mile race

The 'Ultra Trio' was born in 1987—a set of three ultra races of 700, 1000 and 1,300 miles. (Sri Chinmoy Centre, History). No runners finished the 1300 Miler in New York in 1987 and 1988, but in 1989, Al Howie was the first person to complete the grueling Sri Chinmoy 1,300-mile (2,100 km) distance, setting the world record at 17 days and 9 hours. He also set a world record for 2000 kilometres in the same race.

Later that year, Howie set a record of 255.5 miles (411.2 km) for the 72-hour "Across the Years" race in Phoenix, Arizona, which doubles as the last ultra of one year and the first of the next, running from December 29, 1989, to New Year's Day, 1990. Across the Years Howie's longest and most famous run was in the summer of 1991 when he ran the entire length of the Trans Canada Highway from the Mile Zero sign in St. John's, Nfld, to Mile Zero in Victoria, B.C. covering the 7295.5 km in the record time of 72 days, 10 hours and 23 minutes. A brass plaque at Victoria's Mile Zero commemorates the event, and qualified him for the Guinness Book of Records. He had raised $750,000 for the Elks and Royal Purple Fund for children with special needs.

Two weeks after his Trans Canada run, Howie was back in New York where he improved his own record time for the 1,300 miles (2,100 km), completing the distance in 16 days and 19 hours, and earning him his second entry that summer in the Guinness Book of Records. His Sri Chinmoy running mates called him "the trans Canada crossing god."

=== Battling Injuries and illness: 1985, 1992 – 1999 ===
==== Brain tumour ====
Howie's first solo attempt to cross Canada was in the summer of 1985. The route was from West to East via Prince Rupert and the Yellowhead Highway to Portage la Prairie, to Ottawa. It was part of Howie's North America running tour "to promote world peace and famine relief." The run was halted dramatically in the Ottawa Valley when a malignant brain tumour appeared behind his right ear, triggering thoughts of dying.

"Facing death, I realized the extent of my love for this life; I didn't want to die," he wrote in a medical journal a year later. "Reluctant to submit to prescribed medical treatments of exploratory surgery, excision of the tumour and subsequent chemotherapy," he searched and found alternate treatments, especially "the culinary adventure of macrobiotics," a regimen of wholesome foods free of additives and preservatives, and shiatsu massage. As if miraculously, his illness reversed itself within months and he recommenced his training. In gratitude, he ran the 1200 kilometres from Victoria to the White Spruce Farm in Fernie, in southern B. C., where he had received some of his healing instruction and motivation.

==== Diabetes I ====
In 1992, the year after crossing Canada from east to west, Howie joined 28 other ultra-runners in a run across the United States. Not wearing proper inserts in his shoes while crossing the hot Mojave Desert in Arizona, he developed complications from blisters on his feet, forcing him to withdraw. It was this injury, he believes, that eventually led to the onset of Diabetes I, which, unfortunately, wasn't diagnosed for three years.

He competed in the 1300 Miler in New York in 1993 but an inflamed nerve to his left knee forced him to withdraw after six days of running. By the summer of 1995, he had lost 30 lbs, his health was haywire, and "the pissing evil" had struck. "Type 1 diabetes was, until the discovery of insulin, a death sentence within two years," he wrote later.

"Death penalty commuted to life sentence of insulin injections," Howie wrote after starting treatment. "Fighting back to life and health, this time via the more conventional method, the only way to go for insulin dependent diabetics—insulin therapy." He attempted a running comeback in the 1996 Victoria 24-hour run, but could only muster 100 kilometres in the day and night run. Al made a couple of runs for the Victoria chapter of the Canadian Cancer Society in 1996, running the length of Vancouver Island for them.

However, Howie refused to let his illness thwart his rigorous training regimen.

"I'm back on the multi-day circuit, Novolin pens and a One Touch meter tossed into my sport bag with running shoes, orthotics and petroleum jelly. As with life generally, I am finding diabetes complicates racing yet accentuates the intrinsic adventure. More significantly my potential for success, even for record breaking in the grueling sport of ultra-marathon racing, is not to be compromised by my diabetic condition. Running toward the horizon of human endurance on synthetic insulin is exploring an uncharted universe. Rather than the runner's wall, hypoglycemia becomes the number one threat to be avoided. Once again I'm a pioneer in the aerobic universe, this time in the diabetic galaxy." (Al Howie on the Come Back Trail, December 1997.)

He was back on track again in 1997, winning the Victoria 24-hour race. By 1998 he felt he had regained ultra form and won four out of four ultras entered at distances from 50 miles (80 km) to 72 hours.

His last race was the ultra 72-hour "Across the Years" event in Phoenix, Arizona, which started on December 29, 1998, and finished three days later on New Year's Day, 1999. Howie won the race.

Coping with the disease for a decade and a half proved a formidable challenge. Howie was 46 when he ran across Canada. He resided in a residential and transitional care facility in Duncan, British Columbia, where he underwent treatment for diabetes. He died in June 2016.

== Honours ==
The brass plaque on the post of the Trans Canada Highway Mile 0 marker in Victoria's Beacon Hill Park reads:

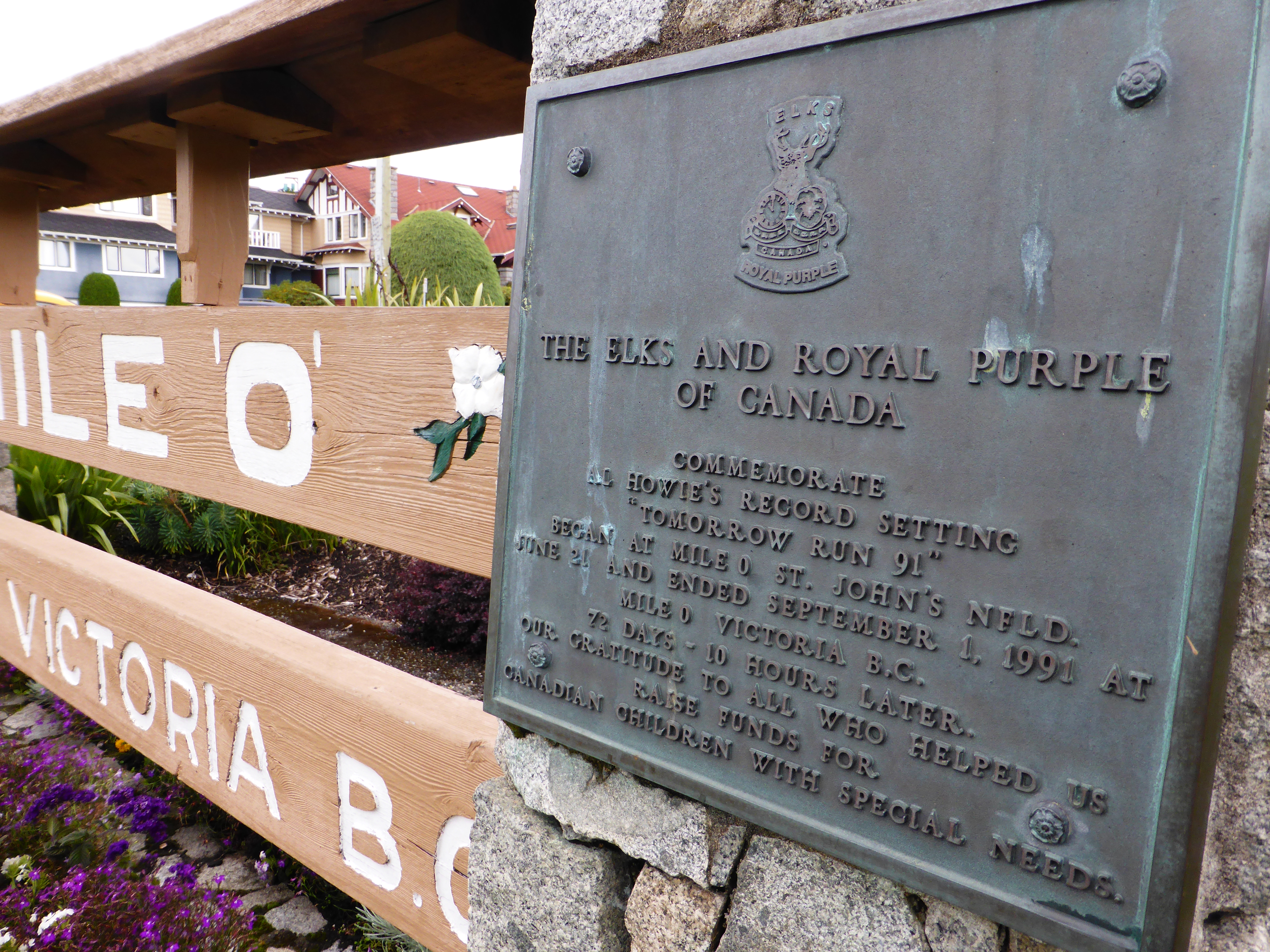
Tomorrow Run 91 Plaque at Mile 0, Victoria B.C.

'The Elks and Royal Purple of Canada commemorate Al Howie's record setting
"Tomorrow Run 91".

Began at Mile 0 St. John's, Nfld June 21 and ended September 1, 1991, at Mile 0 Victoria BC, 72 days – 10 hours later.

Our gratitude to all who helped us raise funds for Canadian children with special needs'.

== Running History ==
Year started: 1974. First "between cities" run: from Victoria to Port Hardy on Vancouver Island, 1978.
First marathon: "Prince George to Boston," 1979.
Best marathon: 2:29:11 Vancouver, May 2, 1982.
Marathons: scores.
First Ultramarathon: Sri Chinmoy International 24-Hour race in Ottawa, 1981. Set North American record of 150 miles, 395 yards in 1982.
Ultras: scores
Average yearly mileage: 10,000 kilometres.
Longest documented solo run: Trans Canada Highway, summer 1991, 7295,5 kilometres, in 72 days, 10 hours and 23 minutes.
Most memorable ultras: Sri Chinmoy 24-Hour race, Ottawa, 1981; Sri Chinmoy 1300 Miler, New York, 1991.
Worst ultra: Sri Chinmoy 24-Hour race, Ottawa, 1986. "Recovering at the time from a bout with The Big C."
Average weekly training mileage: 200K.
Peak week: 595 Miles (first week of a multi-day race).
Favourite shoes: Brooks Kona.
Most common injury: Blisters on feet; Diabetes I since 1995.
Average training pace: 14K/hour.
Favourite race drink/food: Water/Power Bars.
Running idols: "I don't idolize anyone but I admire many."
Greatest influence: Don Ritchie, Emil Zatopek, Yiannis Kouros, Hilary Walker.
Favourite place to run: Sri Chinmoy one mile loop, Flushing Meadow, New York.
Funniest running experience: Learning to tie shoe-laces without stopping during world record non-stop run.
Most memorable discovery: "Even very good runners can have serious health problems."
Last completed race: "Across the Years" in Phoenix, Arizona, between December 29, 1998, and January 1, 1999.

=== Personal Bests ===
Mile 4:44 (1982)
10 Miles 51:52 (1981)
½ Marathon 1:12:28 (1982)
Marathon 2:29:11 (1982)
50K 3:13:49 (1983)
50 Miles 5:35:12 (1983)
100K 7:30:31 (1983)
100 Miles 14:06:18 (1982)
200K 18:51:44 (1982)
24 Hours 150 miles 395 yards (1982)
48 Hours 203 miles (327 km) (1992)
72 Hours 272 miles (1991)
6 Days 514 miles (827 km) (1991)
1000K 7 days, 18 hours, 49 min, 18 sec (1991)
1000 Miles 12 days, 1 hours, 47 min, (1991)
2000K 15 days, 23 hours (world record, 1991)
1300 Miles 16 days, 19 hours (Guinness record, 1991)
Trans Canada Highway 7295.5 kilometres in 72 days, 10 hours and 23 minutes (Guinness record, 1991)

=== Multi-Day, Multi-City Runs ===
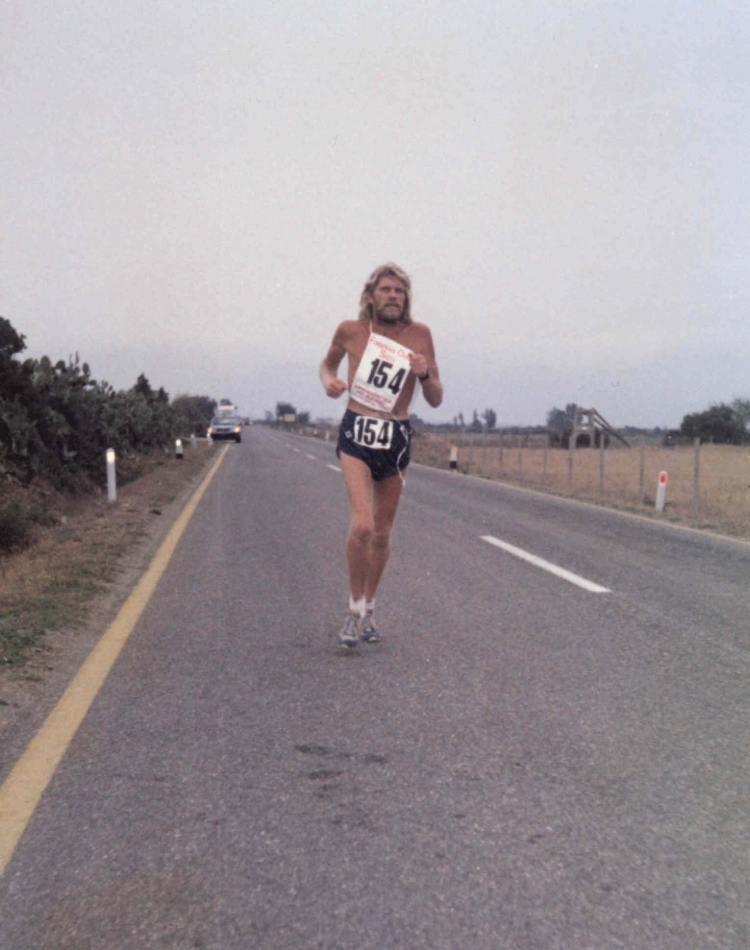
Super Marathon Nuraghi - Sardinia. Circa 1988

Very early in his running career, Howie began running from city to city, partly as long-distance training, partly to save costs (he would put his clothes on the bus, run to the city, change his clothes, put his bags back on the bus, and carry on), often for charities and other purposes. Below is a chronological listing of Howie's multi-day, multi-city runs, with estimated distances (a normal day's run is about 100 km), and supporting charities.

October 1978. Ran the length of Vancouver Island from Victoria to Port Hardy (500 km) in support of United Way.

April 1979. Ran from Port Hardy to Victoria (500 km), with letter from mayor of Port Hardy in support of UNICEF.

August 1979. Training run from Victoria to Prince George (820 km). Placed third in the "Prince George to Boston" marathon.

September 1980. Jogged from Edmonton to Victoria (1350 km in 11 days). Placed in top ten in inaugural Royal Victoria Marathon.

August 1981. Ran from Kelowna to Courtney on Vancouver Island (750 km) to promote the B.C. games. Arrived to great applause during opening ceremonies.

July 1982. Ran from Calgary to Slave Lake, Alberta (470 km); won the Slave Lake Riverboat Daze Marathon; then ran back to Calgary (470 km).

August/September/October 1982. Placed third in the Prince George Classic; then ran from Prince George to Victoria (820 km). Won his age group in Royal Victoria marathon.

May 1983. Solo run from Winnipeg to Ottawa (2225 km). Won 24-hour race.

May 1984. Ran from Toronto to Ottawa (450 km) for the 24-hour Race.

December 1984. Ran from Victoria to Port Hardy (500 km) for Times Colonist 1000 Fund.

February 1985. Ran the Trans Canada Highway, Yellowhead route via Prince Rupert and Edmonton to Ottawa (4740 km). Race interrupted by appearance of brain tumour.

April 1986. Ran from Victoria to White Spruce Farm in Fernie (1000 km).

September 1987. Ran from Victoria to Port Hardy to Massett in the Queen Charlottes (870 km), with letter from Victoria Mayor in support of United Way.

June/July 1988. Ran the length of Britain (1400 km in 11 days).

September 1988. Ran from England through France to Sardinia in Italy (1500 km) to enter an ultramarathon.

1989 & 1990. No between cities runs.

June to September 1991. Ran the Trans Canada Highway from Mile Zero in St. John's, NL, to Victoria, BC (7295.5 km in 72 days and 10 hours). Raised $750,000 for Elks and Royal Purple of Canada for their Purple Cross Fund for children with special needs.

June 1992. Trans-American Footrace from Huntington Beach, CA, to New York, NY. Severe blisters forced Howie to drop out in Las Vegas (370 km).

December 1992. Ran from Victoria to Sacramento (1190 km) for the Helen Klein 6-day race.

1993 & 1994 & 1995. No between cities runs.

October 1996. Ran length of Vancouver Island to Port Hardy (500 km) for Canadian Diabetic Association. Stopped running due to insulin treatments for Type I diabetes.
