= International Association of Ultrarunners =

World governing body of ultra running

- Sport: Ultramarathon and Long distance running
- Abbreviation: IAU
- Founded: 1984
- President: Nadeem Khan (Vice President) (CAN)
- Secretary: Hilary Walker (GBR)

Official website
- www.iau-ultramarathon.org

The International Association of Ultrarunners (IAU) is the world governing body of ultra running, race events longer than the marathon distance of 42.2 km. It regulates and sanctions the World Championships for various ultramarathon distances, and tracks world records in ultra distance races approved by IAU. IAU operates under the patronage of the World Athletics and follows World Athletics rules.

== Events ==
IAU events include:

Event	Frequency	First year
World Events
IAU 50 km World Championships	Annual	2015
IAU 100 km World Championships	Annual	1987
IAU 24 Hour World Championship	Annual	2001 (and 1990)
IAU Trail World Championships	Annual	2007
Regional Events
IAU 50 km European Championships	Annual	2015
IAU 100 km European Championships	Annual	1992
IAU 24 Hour European Championships	Annual	1992
IAU 100 km Asian Championships	Biennial	2010
IAU 100 km Americas Championships	Biennial	2017

== See also ==
- 24-hour run
- Ultramarathon
- International Trail Running Association (ITRA)
- World Mountain Running Association (WMRA)
- International Ski Mountaineering Federation (ISMF)
- Sky Running
