= Aleksandr Sorokin =

Lithuanian long-distance runner

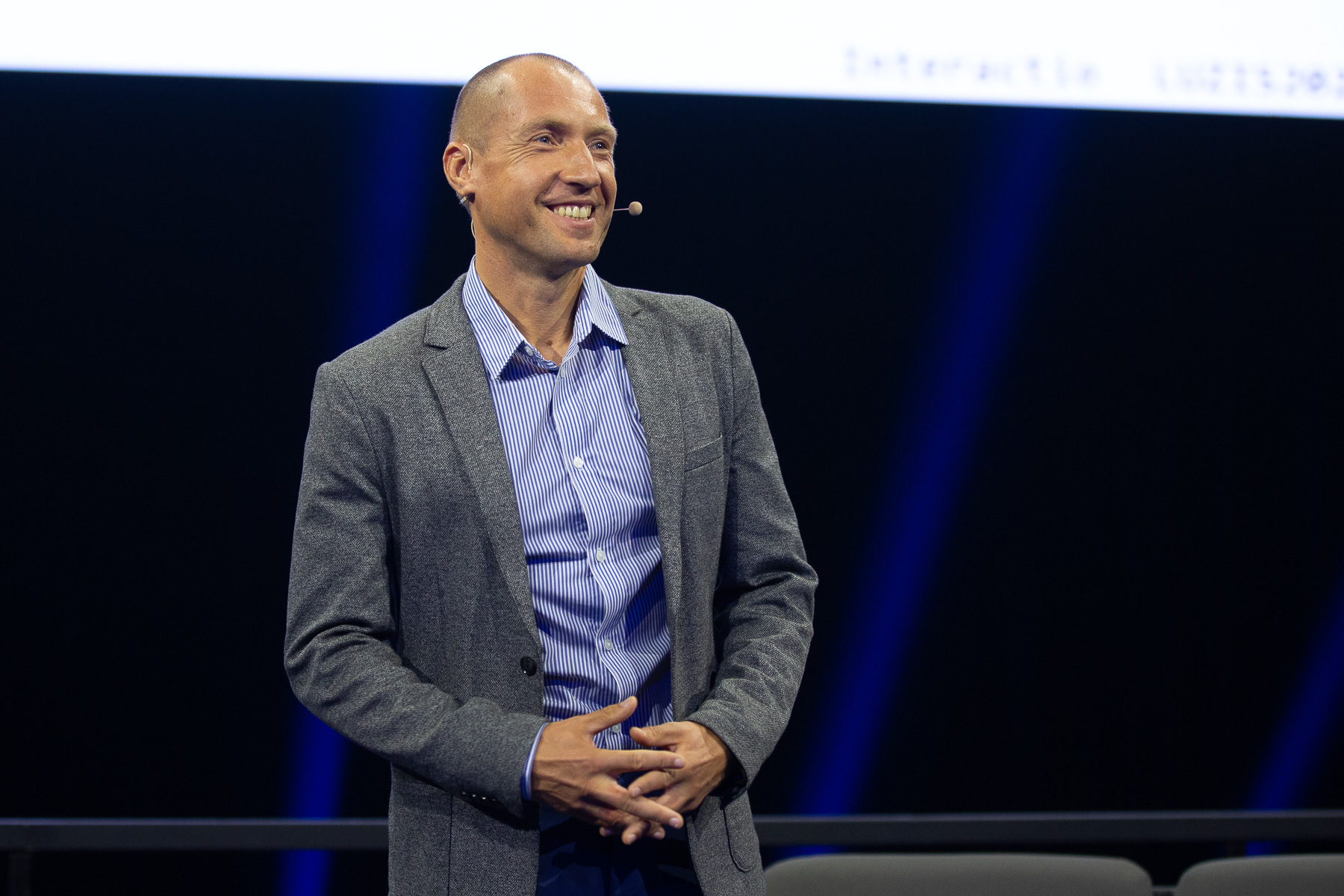

Personal information
- Full name: Aleksandr Sorokin
- Nickname: Sania
- Nationality: Lithuanian
- Born: 30 September 1981 (age 44)
- Years active: 2013–present
- Weight: 72 kg (159 lb) (2021); 100 kg (220 lb) (2012)

Sport
- Sport: Ultramarathon
- Events: 50 and 100 kilometres, 100 miles (161 km), 12 and 24-hour runs
- Club: Cosma (Vilnius, 2022–)
- Coached by: Sebastian Białobrzeski
Medal record
Men's Ultramarathon (partial list)
World Championships
Gold medal – first place	2023 IAU 24 Hour World Championship	Individual
Gold medal – first place	2023 IAU 24 Hour World Championship	Team
Gold medal – first place	2019 IAU 24 Hour World Championship	Individual
European Championships
Gold medal – first place	2022 IAU 24 Hour European Championship	Individual
Bronze medal – third place	2018 IAU 24 Hour European Championship	Individual
Ultramarathons
Gold medal – first place	2017 Spartathlon	246 km

Aleksandr "Sania" Sorokin (Lithuanian: Aleksandras Sorokinas; born 30 September 1981) is a Lithuanian long-distance runner who holds multiple world and European records. As of May 2023, he held seven world records on the track and road: 100 km (road), 100 miles (road), 100 miles (track), 6-hour run (track), 12-hour run (track), 12-hour run (road), 24-hour run (road). Sorokin won the IAU 24 Hour World Championship in 2019, IAU European 24 Hour Championships in 2022 and the Spartathlon in 2017.

He holds the world record for the greatest distances in 24 hours [319.6 kilometres (198.6 miles)], in 12 hours [177.4 kilometres (110.2 miles)], and achieved the fastest time for 100 miles (10 hours, 51 minutes, 39 seconds), in some cases having broken his own earlier records in subsequent runs.

== Career ==
Aleksandr Sorokin kayaked and canoed for Lithuanian teams until a shoulder injury at aged 25. He later began running in 2013, at the age of 31, to lose weight (he was 100 kg). He quickly demonstrated exceptional qualities in ultra distance running and took part in his first 100 kilometres race in 2013.

In 2015, he set the Lithuanian records for 100 km (6:50:34) and 24 hours (242.189 km) at the respective World Championships.

In 2017, Sorokin won the prestigious Spartathlon in Greece, becoming the 35th winner and the third-fastest athlete in this race.

In 2019 at the IAU 24 Hour World Championship held in Albi, France, he had his breakthrough performance, breaking the championship record with a distance of 278.972 kilometres.

On 24 April 2021, he set both the 100-mile and the 12-hour world records during the Centurion Running Track 100 Mile in England (official record ratifiable splits are also taken there at the 50 km, 50-mile, 100 km, 6 hrs and 12 hrs en route). His 100-mile (160.934 kilometers) world record was a time of 11:14:56, and his 12-hour world record was a distance of 105.825 miles/170.309 kilometers. Sorokin kept overall pace for the 12 hours of running at a 6:48 minutes per mile (4:14 per kilometer). Later that year on 29 August, he broke Yiannis Kouros' 24-hour world record of 303.3 km, set in 1997. He covered 309.4 km with an average pace of 4:39 per kilometer in Pabianice, Poland.

At the Spartanion race in Tel Aviv, Israel on 6 January 2022, the 40-year-old bested his own two records in one run and became the first runner to break the 11-hour barrier for 100 miles as he covered the distance (161 km) in 10 hours, 51 minutes and 39 seconds, and then continued on and broke a second record – the furthest distance run in 12 hours, at 111.24 miles. On 23 April at the Centurion Running Track 100 Mile, he set a new world record for the 100 kilometres with a time of 6:05:41. On 18 September, Sorokin bettered his own 24-hour record by more than 10 kilometers at the IAU European 24 Hour Championships staged in Verona, Italy. He achieved a distance of 319.614 kilometres which is only 1.5 miles short of 200 miles, and averaged a 4:30/km (7:15/mile) pace over 24 hours (he began with 3:55–3:58/km pace and managed to finish with a 5:05–5:10/km pace).

== Personal bests ==
Event	Time Result	Place	Meeting	Date	Notes
100 km (road)	6:05:35	Vilnius, Lithuania	World's Fastest Run	14 May 2023	WA World record
100 miles (track)	11:14:56+	Ashford, United Kingdom	Centurion Running Track 100 Mile	24 April 2021	World record
100 miles (road)	10:51:39+	Tel Aviv, Israel	Spartanion Race	6 January 2022	IAU World record Video on YouTube
6-hour run	98.496 km	Ashford, United Kingdom	Centurion Running Track 100 Mile	24 April 2021	IAU World record
12-hour run (track)	170.309 km	Ashford, United Kingdom	Centurion Running Track 100 Mile	24 April 2021	World record
12-hour run (road)	177.410 km	Tel Aviv, Israel	Spartanion Race	7 January 2022	IAU World record Video on YouTube
24-hour run (road)	319.614 km	Verona, Italy	IAU European 24 Hour Championships	18 September 2022	IAU World record
