= Self-Transcendence 24 Hour Race Ottawa =

Coordinates: 45.442100°N 75.572199°W

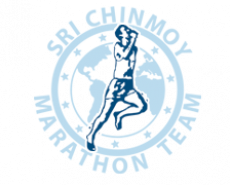
- Logo
- Location: Ottawa, Ontario, Canada
- Event type: Ultramarathon
- Established: 1981
- Website: ca.srichinmoyraces.org

The Ottawa Self-Transcendence 24 Hour Race was part of a triple Ultramarathon race (6h, 12h, and 24h) in the National Capital Region Ottawa, Ontario, Canada. Organized by the Sri Chinmoy Marathon Team the run took place in July. For many years, this race was held on an outdoor track at the Terry Fox Athletic Facility, and then indoors at the Louis Riel dome, on a 400-metre track. Since 2017, the race was held outdoors at the Asticou Training Centrein Gatineau, Quebec (3 km from Ottawa). Runners from Canada and all over the world participated. It was the longest-running 24 hour race and oldest timed ultrarace worldwide. Runners from Canada and all over the world participate.

== History ==
The race first took place in 1981. Since its debut, it hosted the National 24 Hour Championship on several occasions. Since 2009, it also included a 6-hour, a 12-hour and a 6-hour relay race. Over the years, additional distance races were added as well: 50 km, 50 mi, 100 km, 100 mi, and 200 km. The event last took place in 2022 with a 6 hour race.

== Records ==
During the first race in May 1981, Al Howie set the Canadian and North American record, with a final distance of 239.987 km. The following year, he surpassed his record by attaining a distance of 241.726 km. The men's course record is 242.919 km by Peter Holubar in 1990. The women's course record of 214.487 km was set by Jamie Donaldson in 2009. During this race, she also broke the US 200 km record for women. In 2013, Jon Olsen ran 100 miles in 11:59.28, setting a new American 100-mile track record and a new North American record. The race was listed as one of the world's toughest endurance challenges.
