= Patrycja Bereznowska =

Polish long-distance runner (born 1975)

Patrycja Bereznowska (born 17 October 1975) is a Polish long-distance runner who specializes in 24-hour running.

== Competitions ==
As of August 2019, she has completed thirteen 24-hour runs and won the IAU 24 Hour World Championship and IAU 24 Hour European Championship, both individually and in a team. She ran her first half-marathon in 2008 and her first ultramarathon in 2013.

In 2015, in Turin, she won a bronze medal in the team competition as part of the IAU 24 Hour World Championship (together with Aleksandra Niwińska and Agata Matejczuk; she placed fifth individually). She also won silver medals both individually and in the team competition in the European Championship. A year later, in Albi, in the IAU 24 Hour European Championship, she won a silver medal individually and a gold medal in the team competition (together with Agata Matejczuk and Milena Grabska-Grzegorczyk). In 2017, she won a gold medal individually and a silver medal with her team in the IAU 24 Hour World Championship in Belfast. In 2019, she won a bronze medal individually and a silver medal with her team during the World Championship in Albi.

She beat the 24-hour run unofficial world record twice (there are no official world records in this competition): in 2017 in Belfast with a result of 259,991 meters and in the Athens – Sparta ultramarathon Spartathlon (246 km) in 2017 with the time of 24:48:18.

Bereznowska won gold many times in the Polish Championship for the 24 Hour Run – in 2014, 2016, 2017, and 2018. She won silver in the same competition in 2013 and in 2020.

In 2019, she became the first Polish woman to participate in the Badwater Ultramarathon. She won the women's category and came second overall, only behind Yoshihiko Ishikawa of Japan, with a time of 24:13:24.

She also competes in other kinds of runs including marathons, half-marathons, military runs in with all the equipment, uniform, and a 10 kg backpack, and obstacle racing.

== Personal life ==
Patrycja Bereznowska is a graduate of the University of Life Sciences in Lublin, Poland. In 2005, she obtained a doctoral degree in agricultural sciences in the field of animal science with a thesis entitled "Assessment of the Impact of Horse Exploitation and the Conditions of Running Long-Distance Rallies on the Obtained Results."

She worked as a horse-riding instructor and competed professionally before she became an ultramarathon runner. She still trains horses and riders for a living.

Her hobbies outside of horses and running are Tai chi, cooking, and gardening.
