= IAU 100 km Asian Championships =

- Sport: Ultramarathon
- First season: 2010
- Website: iau-ultramarathon.org

The IAU 100 km Asian Championships is an annual, ultrarunning competition over 100 kilometres for athletes from Asia and Oceana. It is organised by the International Association of Ultrarunners (IAU) and was first held in 2010.

== Editions ==
Edition	Year	Location	Country	Date	No. of athletes	No. of nations
1st	2010	Jeju Island	Korea	5 June		
2nd	2011	Jeju Island	Korea	26 March		
3rd	2014	Dongshan River, Yilan County	Taiwan	13 December		

== Medal summary ==
=== Men ===
Year	Gold		Silver		Bronze	
2010	Dong Mun Lee (KOR)	7:23:20	Yasutoshi Oshima (JPN)	7:26:20	Toru Sakuta (JPN)	7:37:36
2011	Yoshikaza Haro (JPN)	6:52:07	Pin Chi Chou (TPE)	8:01:52	Dae Soo Kim (KOR)	9:06:40
2014	Yen-Lung Yu (TPE)	8:10:48	Sungkyun Kim (KOR)	8:12:17	Jonguen Kim (KOR)	8:16:26

=== Women ===
Year	Gold		Silver		Bronze	
2010	Mai Fujisawa (JPN)	8:01:32	Takako Asano (JPN)	8:44:59	Yoko Yamazawa (JPN)	8:53:11
2011	Mai Fujisawa (JPN)	8:28:10	Hee Kyung Joung (KOR)	9:22:15	Narae Park (KOR)	9:40:35
2014	Ming-chu Lu (TPE)	8:55:23	Badamkhatan Dovdon (MGL)	9:04:33	Wei-chen Li (TPE)	9:17:16
