= Maria Jannson =

Dean of Waterford since 2011

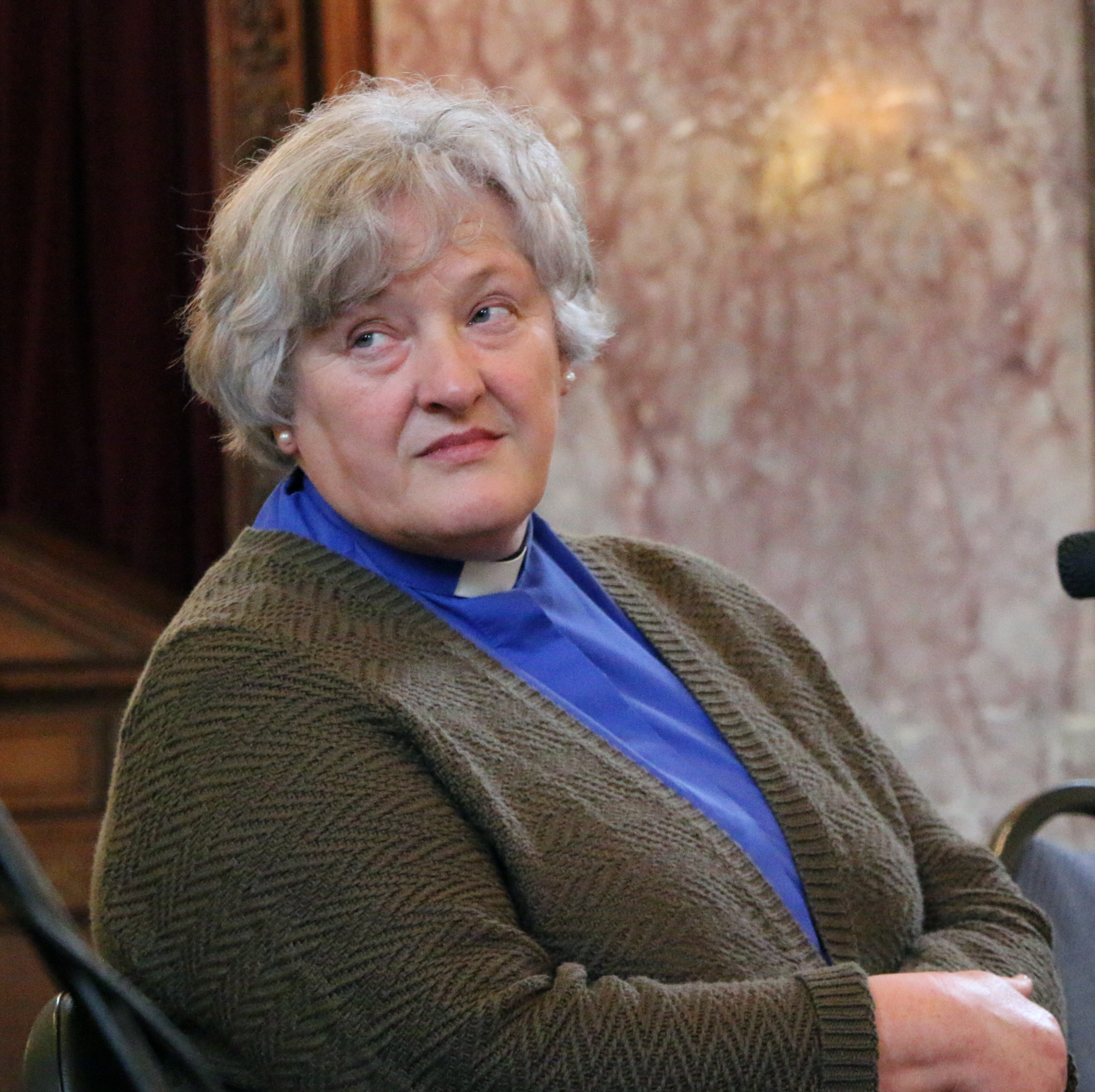
The Very Revd Maria Jansson in 2016

Maria Patricia Jansson has been Dean of Waterford since 2011.

Jansson was born in 1955. Her father was Swedish and her mother Irish. She was educated at the Milltown Institute of Theology and Philosophy and the Church of Ireland Theological Institute. She was a school teacher in Cork and Dublin before her call to ministry. Jannson has lectured in University College Dublin, and the Mater Dei Institute of Education. After curacies in Galway and Kilscoran she was the incumbent at St Iberius', Wexford until her appointment as Dean.
