= Edit Bérces =

Hungarian ultramarathon runner

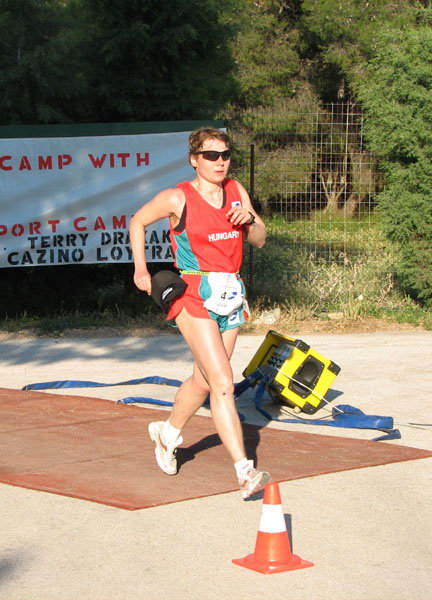
Bérces Edit

Edit Bérces (born May 16, 1964 in Zalaegerszeg, Hungary) is a Hungarian ultramarathon runner, world record holder, former world and European champion.

Berces is Hungary's most successful ultra runner. During her career she set several world records, four of which still stand, and holds virtually all Hungarian records from 100 kilometers to 48 hours.

Top accomplishments include her 2000 world and European 100 kilometer titles and her 24-hour European championship victory in 2002. She has also twice won Hungary's top ultramarathon race, the five-day Vienna–Bratislava–Budapest Supermarathon. She won the IAU 24 Hour World Championship in 2001.

In 2002, just two weeks after winning the European 24-hour Championship, she set a world record over 24 hours on the track as well as a 100-mile world record en route. Based on those accomplishments, Ultramarathon World voted her the top female ultramarathoner of 2002.

In 2004, Berces set a 24-hour world record on the treadmill and set a 100-mile world record as well en route. Both of these records still stand. At the time, Bérces's 24-hour record was better than the men's world record.

== World records ==
Event	Type	Result	Place	Date
100 mile	track	14:25:45	Verona	September 21–22, 2002
100 mile	treadmill	14:15:08	Budapest	March 8–9, 2004
24H	track	250.106K	Verona	September 21–22, 2002
24H	treadmill	247.2K	Budapest	March 8–9, 2004

== Personal bests ==
Event	Type	Result	Place	Date
100 km	road	7:25:21	Winschoten	2000
100 km	track	8:03:52	Camporosso	2002
12H	road	135.344K	Gravigny	2002
12H	track	135.057K	Verona	2002
100 mile	track	14:25:45	Verona	2002
100 mile	road	14:56:09	Cologne	2001
24H	road	237.6454K	Wörschach	2003
24H	track	250.106K	Verona	2002
48H	track	369.7493K	Surgeres	2003
