= 24-hour run =

Form of ultramarathon

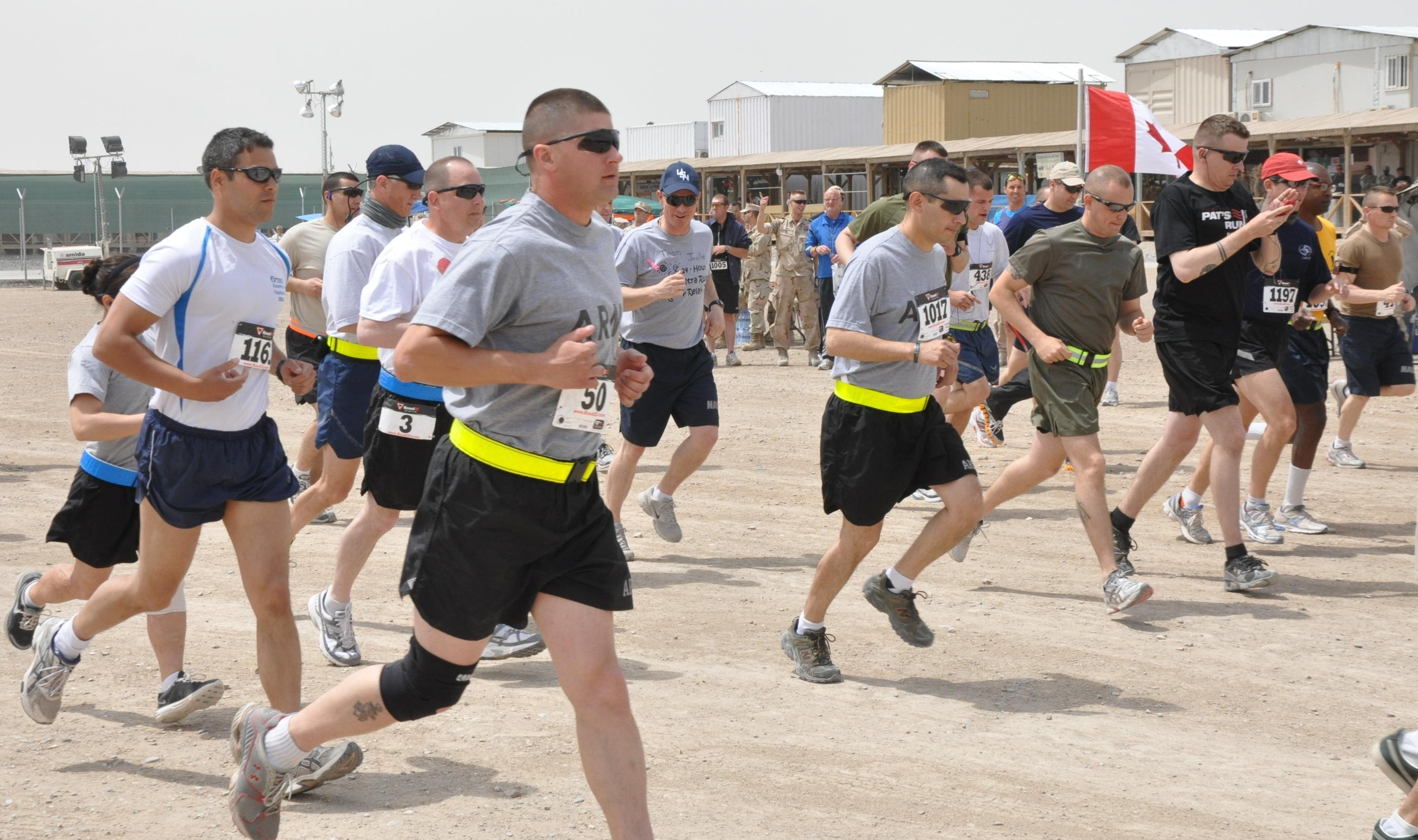
Service members and civilians stationed at Kandahar Airfield, Afghanistan, start the 24-Hour Run for Charity, 16 April 2011.

A 24-hour run is a form of ultramarathon, in which a competitor runs as far as they can in 24 hours. They are typically held on 1- to 2-mile loops or occasionally 400-meter tracks.

Top runners will often run 200 kilometres (124 mi) or more, depending on conditions, and the best can go beyond 270 kilometres (168 mi). Some participants will have a crew to help them, but others just set up a camp with all the gear and supplies they need near the starting area to access each loop. Often 24-hour events are combined with 6-, 12-, and 48-hour events. 24-hour runs have also been held in relay formats, with runners completing a mile each in succession for 24 hours. Often these events are not internationally sanctioned, and are more for charitable purposes.

The world records for the event on all surfaces are 319.614 km (198.598 miles) for men, set by Aleksandr Sorokin of Lithuania in 2022 and 278.622 kilometers (173.127 miles) for women, set by Sarah Webster of Great Britain in 2025.

== Competitions ==
The first international championship was held 3–4 February 1990 in Milton Keynes, England. A full continental championship was formed in 1992 as the IAU 24 Hour European Championships.

The IAU 24 Hour World Championship is the pinnacle of competition in the 24-hour run. The first IAU Individual Track Championships were held in San Giovanni Lupatoto, Verona, Italy on 22–23 September 2001.

The German website DUV lists 160 24-hour races that were scheduled for 2012, a figure that has doubled over the last 10 years. The longest running 24-hour race is the Self-Transcendence 24 Hour Race Ottawa, Canada which began in 1981.

== See also ==
- One hour run
- 12-hour run
- Centurion Walk
- Rogaining
