= Ernő Kis-Király =

Hungarian ultramarathon runner

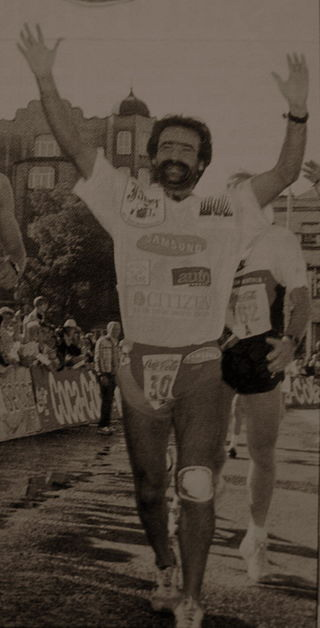

Personal information
- National team: Hungary
- Born: March 26, 1958 (age 68) Komló, Hungary

Sport
- Event: Ultramarathon
Medal record
Representing Hungary
Ultramarathon
12 Hour European Championship
Gold medal – first place	1991 Moreuil
12 Hour European Cup
Gold medal – first place	1985 Hirtenberg
International 12 Hour Run
Gold medal – first place	1987
Cross Austria
Gold medal – first place	1986	749 km in 7 stages
Spartathlon
Silver medal – second place	1986
Vienna–Bratislava–Budapest Supermarathon
Gold medal – first place	1990
Gold medal – first place	1991
Silver medal – second place	1992
Gold medal – first place	1993
Grande Course des Sables
Gold medal – first place	1986

Ernő Kis-Király (born March 26, 1958 in Komló, Hungary), (father: Kálmán Kis-Király miner; mother: Lenke Handó an employee of the Hungarian State Railways) is a Hungarian ultramarathon runner.

Kis-Király is most well known for his three victories at the Vienna to Budapest Supermarathon five-day stage race, the most prestigious road race in Central Europe of the 1990s. At the same time, his sub 6:30 hour mark at the 100 km (De Nacht van Vlaanderen 1989) event and his 12-hour performance exceeding 150 km (1991) are just as remarkable.

== Clubs and coaches ==
Kis-Kiraly's athletic career started in the local miners’ soccer club called Komlói Bányász in 1968 from which, being a promising middle and long distance track runner, he transferred to track and field. During his mandatory army service he trained in Kiskunfélegyháza and Budapest. Between 1992 and 1995 he competed for Pile Sports Club as a semi-professional long-distance runner. He was coached by Sándor Fogarasi (Komlói Bányász) 1973-74; István Dudás (Komlói Bányász) 1975-77; József Babinyecz (Kiskunfélegyházi Honvéd) 1977-79; and István Gonda BVSC 1985-86. From 1987 on he was his own coach.

== Ultramarathon highlights ==
The highlights of his ultramarathon career include his European Cup victory achieved in Hirtenberg, Austria in 1985, his victory earned with a distance of 150,838 km, in the 12-hour event in Szeged, Hungary in 1987, and his European Championship title in the 12-hour event in Moreuil, France in 1991.

Wins in additional ultramarathon events and stage races include feats such as the 61 km run from Zagreb to Cazma, Yugoslavia (1984) or Austria Cross (749 km in 7 days) and the Race Across the Sahara Desert in 13 stages in Algeria in 1986. Also in 1986, Kis-Király was the runner-up behind Yiannis Kouros in the gruelling Spartathlon race from Athens to Sparta.

== Work in the mines ==
Besides representing Hungary as a member of the Hungarian National Track and Field Team and the Association of Hungarian Ultra-runners, Kis-Király worked as locksmith in the mines of Komló between 1979 and 1983 (See Török, 1993). Due to his criticism of the regime he was deprived of his passport in the early 1980s.

The editor of the German professional magazine Condition featured Kis-Király as one of the best prepared and most relaxed runners in the field. In his book on extreme sports, Didier Braun devotes three pages to Kis-Király (Braun 1989).

== Massage therapy and landscape design ==
Besides running, Kis-Király is also an expert in sports massage therapy, gerontological nursing and landscape design. He is not only a mentor for up-and-coming ultra-runners, but is also a chess player.

== Personal best performances ==
Event	Result	Year	Notes
800 m	1:56:06	(1976)	
1500 m	3:48:02	(1982)	
5000 m	14:23:00	(1978)	
10000 m	29:49:09	(1979)	
Marathon	2:18:26	(1986)	
50 km	3:02	(1989)	
100 km	6:24:38	(1989)	
150 km	12:16:01	(1985)	
12 hours	150.838 km	(1987)	
Balaton Supermarathon, 204.7 km in 3 stages	14:23:45	(1983)	course record
Danube Run(Donaulauf), Austria	27:27:50	(1984)	320 km in 3 stages
Zagreb – Cazma Supermarathon 61.3 km	3:40:40	(1984)	course record
Danube Supermarathon, Hungary	12:42:22	(1985)	200 km in 3 stages
Austria Cross 749 km in stages	83:15:00	(1986)	course record
Grande Course Des Sables, Algeria	41:50:00	(1987)	13 marathons in 13 stages
De Nacht van Vlaanderen 100 km	6:56:19	(1989)	
Vienna to Budapest Supermarathon	25:34:44	(1990)	340 km in 5 stages
Pistoia – Abetone 53 km	3:47:15	(1991)	

== Awards ==
Hungarian Ultrarunners' Hall of Fame (2016)

== General references ==
- Condition. Die Zeitschift für Ausdauersport 4, 15. Jahrgang, Juli 1984
- Didier Braun; Agnès Courrault; et al. (1989): Sports extrêmes, AREION Édition, Aulogne Lés Grands Défis de L’Aventure
- Török Ferenc: Bánya - Bécs-Budapest (1993)
- Zsaru Magazin 45. 1993. November 4.
- "Kis-Kiraly, Ernö". statistik.d-u-v.org. Deutsche Ultramarathon-Vereinigung.
