= Eleanor Robinson =

British ultramarathon runner

Personal information
- Nationality: British
- Born: Eleanor Puckrin; 20 November 1947 (age 78)
- Years active: 1982–1998
- Height: 5 ft 8 in (173 cm)
- Weight: 129 lb (59 kg)

Sport
- Sport: Running
- Event: Ultramarathon
- Club: Ripley
Medal record
Ultramarathon
Representing United Kingdom
IAU 100 km World Championships
Gold medal – first place	1990 Duluth	100 km
Gold medal – first place	1991 Faenza	100 km
Bronze medal – third place	1988 Santander	100 km

Eleanor Robinson (formerly Adams, née Puckrin, 20 November 1947) is a British former ultramarathon runner and two-time winner of the IAU 100km World Championships. She was the first woman to run over 150 miles in a 24-hour endurance race. She was the winner of the first Badwater Ultramarathon in 1987. She was twice bronze medallist at the IAU 100 km European Championships (1992, 1993).

== Early life ==
Eleanor Robinson, née Puckrin, was brought up in Middlesbrough, North Yorkshire, England, the sister of Arthur, Richard and Philip. All of them were keen athletes. Arthur, the eldest, at the age of 69 broke the over 50s world record for the Tetra-Ironman in Virginia in October 2007.

== Career ==
Eleanor Robinson's ultramarathon career arguably began when she witnessed Ros Paul, a fellow Briton, set a record of 216.648 kilometres (134.619 mi) for 24 hours on the first day of a 6-day race in 1982. This was the first year that British women had run a track ultra and on that first occasion, Lynn Fitzgerald had beaten Ros Paul, setting world bests at 50 miles, 100 km (60 miles) and for 24 hours. It wasn't until 1985, however, that Robinson took on the 24-hour race at an event in Nottingham, where she broke the record with a distance of 222.8 kilometres (138.4 mi).

In the meantime, Robinson took part in the inaugural Spartathlon in 1983. The race covers the 250 km (150 mile) route that the Athenian messenger Pheidippides took in 490BC running from Athens to Sparta to get help against the Persians at the Battle of Marathon. While Yiannis Kouros won the race, Robinson was the first woman to cross the line, in 32:37:52.

The Road Runners Club of America's 1984 National 50-mile and 100 km championships were held on 14 October at Lincoln Park in Chicago. Robinson took the 50-mile women's title in 6:19:25 and went on to win the 100 km in 8:11:37.

At the 1984 New York 6-Day Race, Robinson was up against Donna Hudson, who had just set a new 100-mile world record. Robinson took the lead from the start but was pursued closely by Hudson, who set a new American 48-hour record of 169 miles. Robinson went on to win, setting a world record of 739.36 kilometres (459.42 mi). For the next five or so years, Hudson and Robinson would proceed to battle it out over many races, mostly in Australia. Robinson won all of these challenges but Hudson frequently came second, breaking several American records along the way.

The first of these challenges was four months later in 1984, at Australia's first international 6-day race, which took place at Colac, Victoria and would become known as the Cliff Young Australian 6-day race. In taking sixth place overall, Robinson broke 11 world records, becoming the first woman to surpass 800 kilometres (500 mi) for the event, exceeding the 760 kilometres (470 mi) world record set only a few weeks earlier in La Rochelle, France, by Edith Couhe. Hudson ran 770.5 kilometres (478.8 mi) to set a new American best. Robinson ran Colac four more times, from 1986 to 1989 (it wasn't held in 1985), winning on each occasion and thereby beating Hudson twice more. The 1987 race was the last of Hudson's career. While she set another American record of 780.6 kilometres (485.0 mi), Robinson ran a fresh world record of 838.8 kilometres (521.2 mi).

Her most notable appearance at Colac was in 1989, when Sandra Barwick of New Zealand set out to beat Robinson's record. Robinson, however, came in third behind the two male athletes Maurice Taylor and Bryan Smith, with a new best of 866.36 kilometres (538.33 mi). Barwick came in 6 km (4 miles) behind to place fourth. Adam's record five wins at Colac was later matched by Elvira Janosi of Serbia and Montenegro. Robinson, however, is the only athlete to have won the event in five consecutive races.

At the 1985 Westfield Ultra Marathon, a 960 km (600 mile) race from Sydney to Melbourne, Eleanor Robinson lined up against Donna Hudson and Margaret Smith of Melbourne. Robinson and Hudson were favourites but after the first day, Smith led the race. Robinson got ahead on the final day to win the race, just ahead of Hudson and Smith.

Meanwhile, in the Sri Chinmoy Adelaide 24 Hour Race, which was first held in 1982, Robinson was the winning woman and the only one of five, along with 16 men, to surpass 160 kilometres (99 mi).

The 1986 24-hour Multiplex Marathon was held at the Multiplex fitness centre in Deerfield, a suburb of Chicago. It was the first time an ultra event had been held in the area. Robinson was one of 16 competitors, four of them women.

The London to Brighton Race, from the 1960s to the 1980s was considered the premier race in the ultramarathon calendar. The first recorded time is of 13:00:45 by John Bell in 1803. The 1986 race was won by Terry Tullett of Brighton. Robinson was the first woman to finish in a time of 6:43:40.

=== Death Valley to Mount Whitney Challenge ===
1987 was the first year that the official Badwater Ultramarathon was run, on a 146-mile course from Death Valley to Mount Whitney. The previous year, Tom Crawford and Mike Witwer had attempted to organise an official race but it was cancelled when the insurance policy was rescinded. So the two of them ran the course, completing it in 70 hours and 27 minutes. After reading about it in the San Francisco Chronicle, Kenneth Crutchlow, a British adventurer and ultra runner, challenged Crawford and Witwer to a team race: Crutchlow and a partner, representing Britain, versus the American pair. Reputedly, he wagered a pint of English ale.

Crutchlow put an ad in Athletics Weekly to find a teammate and Robinson, at the time considered the best female ultra runner in the world, was the only person to respond. Supposedly Witwer pulled out when he discovered with whom Crutchlow was paired, concerned that he'd be beaten by a woman. Crawford found a replacement in Jean Ennis. Robinson, aged 39 at the time, took the lead early on and never relinquished it. After 52 miles, the American pair managed to close the gap to 7.5 minutes. Another 56 miles later, however, Robinson had stretched her lead to 4 hours. She completed the ascent of Mount Whitney after 52 hours and 45 minutes. Crawford and Ennis finished in 58:57. Robinson's teammate, the 45-year-old Crutchlow, finished the race in 126:30, alongside David Bolling, a journalist who decided to run the race to get the inside scoop.

=== From 1990 to retirement ===
The first 24-hour international championship was held at Milton Keynes in 1990, on an indoor loop of 890m around the shopping centre. Robinson reached 200 km (100 miles) in a new all-surface time of 19:00:31. She went on to win, covering a total of 237.861 kilometres (147.800 mi), the second best result after her own track record of 240.169 kilometres (149.234 mi), which she had set the previous year in Melbourne. The women's world record was broken in 2011 by Mami Kudo of Japan but Robinson's record remains the UK all-time best for the event.

The 100 km National Ultramarathon Championships for Great Britain have been held every year since 1989. Robinson won in two successive years, 1996 and 1997, in Edinburgh. Hilary Walker won in 1995 and 1998, having previously won in 1989 and 1990. The championship record is held by Carolyn Hunter-Rowe with a time of 7:34:54 set in 1993.

In 1987, Robinson had set a world record of 16 days, 23 hours and 9 minutes for 1000 miles, at a stage race in England. Now, more than ten years later, at Nanango, Australia, in 1998, Robinson completed the distance in a world best of 13 days, 1 hour 54 minutes.

Robinson's career came to an end in 2001, when a persistent foot injury failed to respond to treatment.

=== Post-retirement ===
Robinson was part of the Team GB crew supporting the competitors at the 2014 IAU 100 km World Championships, which Ellie Greenwood won for the second time. She also supported the England runners at the 2013 Anglo Celtic Plate 100 km race. She was one of the team managers of England Athletics at the Perth 24 Hour race in 2010.

== Achievements ==
Eleanor Robinson has held nearly 40 world records in a range of events from 30 miles to the 6 Day Race and six world titles.

== Personal life ==
Eleanor Robinson has two sons, two daughters and six grandchildren. She lives in Derbyshire.

She is the club secretary of Ripley Running Club. She is also an active member of Belper Ten Twenty Triathlon Club and has qualified and represented Great Britain in Duathlon.
