= János Bogár =

Hungarian ultramarathon runner

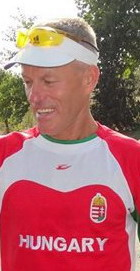

Personal information
- National team: Hungary
- Born: July 26, 1964 (age 61) Miskolc, Hungary

Sport
- Event: Ultramarathon
Medal record
Representing Hungary
Ultramarathon
24 Hour European Championship
Gold medal – first place	1994 Szeged	24-hour run
24-hour run
Gold medal – first place	1993 Szeged	24-hour run
100 km Pedestres Villa de Madrid
Gold medal – first place	2007	100km
Gold medal – first place	2000	100km
Gold medal – first place	1999	100km
Gold medal – first place	1998	100km
Gold medal – first place	1997	100km
Gold medal – first place	1996	100km
Gold medal – first place	1995	100km
Békéscsaba to Arad
Gold medal – first place	2015	197km
Gold medal – first place	2014	197km
Gold medal – first place	2000	197km
Gold medal – first place	1999	197km
Békéscsaba to Nagyvárad
Gold medal – first place	1998	197km
Ultrabalaton
Gold medal – first place	2012	212km
Gold medal – first place	2007	212km
Spartathlon
Gold medal – first place	1991
Vienna to Budapest Supermarathon
Gold medal – first place	1992
Gold medal – first place	1994
Gold medal – first place	1995
Gold medal – first place	1996
Gold medal – first place	1997
Gold medal – first place	1998
Le Défi de Val de Travers
Gold medal – first place	2001
Gold medal – first place	2000
Gold medal – first place	1998
Gold medal – first place	1997

János Bogár (born July 26, 1964, in Miskolc, Hungary) is a Hungarian ultramarathon runner.

== Ultramarathon career highlights ==
Bogár has set and held national records in nearly all Hungarian ultramarathon events in which he has competed. He is the current national record holder in the 100 km and the 24-hour running events.

He is best known for his six victories at the Vienna to Budapest Supermarathon, the most prestigious stage race in Central Europe in the 1990s. The highlights of his ultramarathon career include his European Championship title in the 24-hour event earned in Szeged, Hungary in 1994, his seven victories at the 100 km of Madrid, six victories at the Vienna to Budapest Supermarathon (1992, 1994- 1998) and one at a popular 245 km race between Athens and Sparta (1991).

In 2007 Bogár was the first runner in the history of ultra-running to come close to beat the world's most notable icon of ultramarathon running, Yiannis Kouros in a 212 km race around Lake Balaton, the largest lake in Central Europe.

For his sportsmanship, Bogár was awarded the prestigious Fair Play Award presented by the president of the International Committee for Fair Play Jenő Kamuti in 2009.

== Personal best performances ==
Event	Result	Year	Venue	Notes
6 hours	89.3 km	(2005)	Stein	
50 km	3:07:30	(2002)	Stein	
100 km	6:31:35	(1999)	Encs	national record
12 hours	154.000 km	(1994)	Szeged	national record
24 hours	263.172 km	(1993)	Szeged	national record
Spartathlon	24:15:31	(1991)	Sparta	
UltraBALATON 212 km	18:50:06	(2007)	Tihany	course record
Vienna to Budapest	25:34:44	(1990)	340 km in 5 stages	

== Awards ==
- Hungarian Ultrarunners' Hall of Fame (2016)
- Nominee for Ultramarathon Life Achievement Award (2011)
- Fair Play Award – presented by President of the International Committee for Fair Play

awarded by Jenő Kamuti. (2009)

- Ultra-runner of the Year 2007 – awarded by the Hungarian Ultra-running Association (2007)
