= Dan Lawson =

British ultramarathon runner

- Born: Daniel Lawson; 13 February 1973 (age 53)
- Occupation: Ultra runner
- Website: www.danlawson.life

Dan Lawson (born 13 February 1973) is a British ultra runner and charity worker from Brighton. Lawson also does charity work in India for OSCAR India and Skillshare International. He holds the course record for the Grand Union Canal Race and in 2016, he won the European 24 Hour Championships, and in 2020 set one of the fastest known times for Land's End to John o' Groats (LEJOG).

== Running career ==
In 2009, Lawson entered his first ultramarathon, the London to Brighton run, and placed second. He ran the Brighton Marathon 4 times back-to-back in 2011 and 8 times back-to-back in 2012 to raise money for Albion in the Community's Oscar programme in India. In 2014, Lawson placed first in the Nilgiris Ultra, 100 km, India, the Bangalore Ultra 24 hour, 226 km which created a new Ultra distance record on Indian soil. The same year, he also placed first at the Gloucester 24 hour track race in the UK, covering a distance of 242.88 km.

In 2015, he placed first in the Grand Union Canal Race, beating the previous course record by over three hours. He also placed first and set new course records in the Roseland August trail Black RAT (32 miles); the Ridgeway Challenge Ultra trail, 85 miles; and the Run the Rann 161 km ultra trail, India. Lawson placed second in the Spartathlon, making him the second fastest British runner in the race’s history. He placed 24th in the 2015 IAU 24 Hour World Championship, Turin, receiving a gold team medal as part of Team GB & NI.

Lawson won the IAU 24 Hour European Championships in 2016 with a distance of 261.843 kilometres (162.702 mi).

He holds the record for longest distance run during a 24-hour Ultramarathon in India, and the record for distance run on a treadmill in 7 days, having run 521 miles.

In August 2020, Lawson completed the journey from Land's End to John o' Groats in 9 days, 21 hours, 14 minutes and 2 seconds, setting the fastest known time in the 'GPS era', a time bettered only by the Guinness world record set by Andrew Rivett in 2001.
