= Vienna–Bratislava–Budapest Supermarathon =

The Vienna–Bratislava–Budapest Supermarathon (Vienna–Budapest Supermarathon until 2005) is a 320 kilometer five-day ultramarathon connecting the capitals of Austria, Slovakia and Hungary. It is the largest and most significant ultramarathon race in Hungary and one of the biggest in Central Europe.

Organised since 1990, this multiday race was run for its first fifteen years between Vienna and Budapest but was modified in 2006 to include Bratislava as well.

The change in the route shortened the race to 320 kilometers from 352 kilometers. This reduced the second day to 84 kilometers from 116 kilometers, which according to competitors, significantly changed the dynamics of the event. The shorter second day made completion easier but sped up the event and now favors faster ultra runners over those with more endurance.

The race developed quickly in the early 1990s and there were 65 individual competitors by 1995. However, the race began a slow decline as many individual athletes saw that organizers put more time, money and effort into accommodating the accompanying relay race at the disadvantage of the individual competition. By 2003, the number of competitors had fallen to 30, although the change in route also helped the individual race and the number of runners grew to 42 in 2006.

Meanwhile, the relay race thrived and from an initial 55 teams grew to 167 teams by 2006.

Relay teams consist of five members and during the first four days, four of the five runners compete. On the fifth day, each relay member as well as individual athletes compete in a half marathon.

Prize money awarded in the race is unequalled by any other race in Hungary. Winners receive around $7,800 worth of cash, gifts and other prizes, second place receives $5,800 and third place receives $4,200.

Due in part to the relatively high prize money, the race regularly attracts some of the region's biggest names, including former Comrades Marathon winner Maria Bak of Germany, former Badwater Ultramarathon winner Anatoli Kruglikov of Russia, former Spartathlon winner János Bogár and Polish greats Jaroslaw Janicki and Thomasz Chawawko as well as Brazil's former 100 kilometer world record holder Valmir Nunes.

== Winners ==
=== Women ===
Year	Winner	Country
2011	–	
2010	Event was cancelled	
2009	Irina Vishnevskaya	Russia
2008	Maria Bak	Germany
2007	Maria Bak	Germany
2006	Maria Bak	Germany
2005	Maria Bak	Germany
2004	Maria Bak	Germany
2003	Marina Bytchkova	Russia
2002	Maria Bak	Germany
2001	Maria Bak	Germany
2000	Edit Bérces	Hungary
1999	Martina Bytchkova	Russia
1998	Ágota Farkas	Hungary
1997	Edit Bérces	Hungary
1996	Yelena Sidorenkova	Russia
1995	Maria Alzira da Silva	Portugal
1994	Eleanor Robinson	United Kingdom
1993	Márta Vass	Hungary
1992	Márta Vass	Hungary
1991	Márta Vass	Hungary
1990	Márta Vass	Hungary

=== Men ===
Year	Winner	Country
2011	Csaba Németh	Hungary
2010	Event was cancelled	
2009	Jarosław Janicki	Poland
2008	Jarosław Janicki	Poland
2007	Jarosław Janicki	Poland
2006	Jarosław Janicki	Poland
2005	Jarosław Janicki	Poland
2004	Attila Vozár	Hungary
2003	Thomasz Chawawko	Poland
2002	Anatolij Krouglikov	Russia
2001	Attila Vozár	Hungary
2000	Attila Vozár	Hungary
1999	Konstantin Santalov	Russia
1998	János Bogár	Hungary
1997	János Bogár	Hungary
1996	János Bogár	Hungary
1995	János Bogár	Hungary
1994	János Bogár	Hungary
1993	Ernő Kis-Király	Hungary
1992	János Bogár	Hungary
1991	Ernő Kis-Király	Hungary
1990	Ernő Kis-Király	Hungary

== Route ==
Day	Route	Distance	Cut-off time
Day 1	Vienna - Bratislava	93.6K	11 hours
Day 2	Bratislava – Győr	84K	10:30 hours
Day 3	Győr – Tata	60.8K	7:30 hours
Day 4	Tata – Budakeszi	59.2K	7:30 hours
Day 5	Budakeszi – Budapest	21.1K	2:30 hours
