= Ryōichi Sekiya =

Japanese long-distance runner

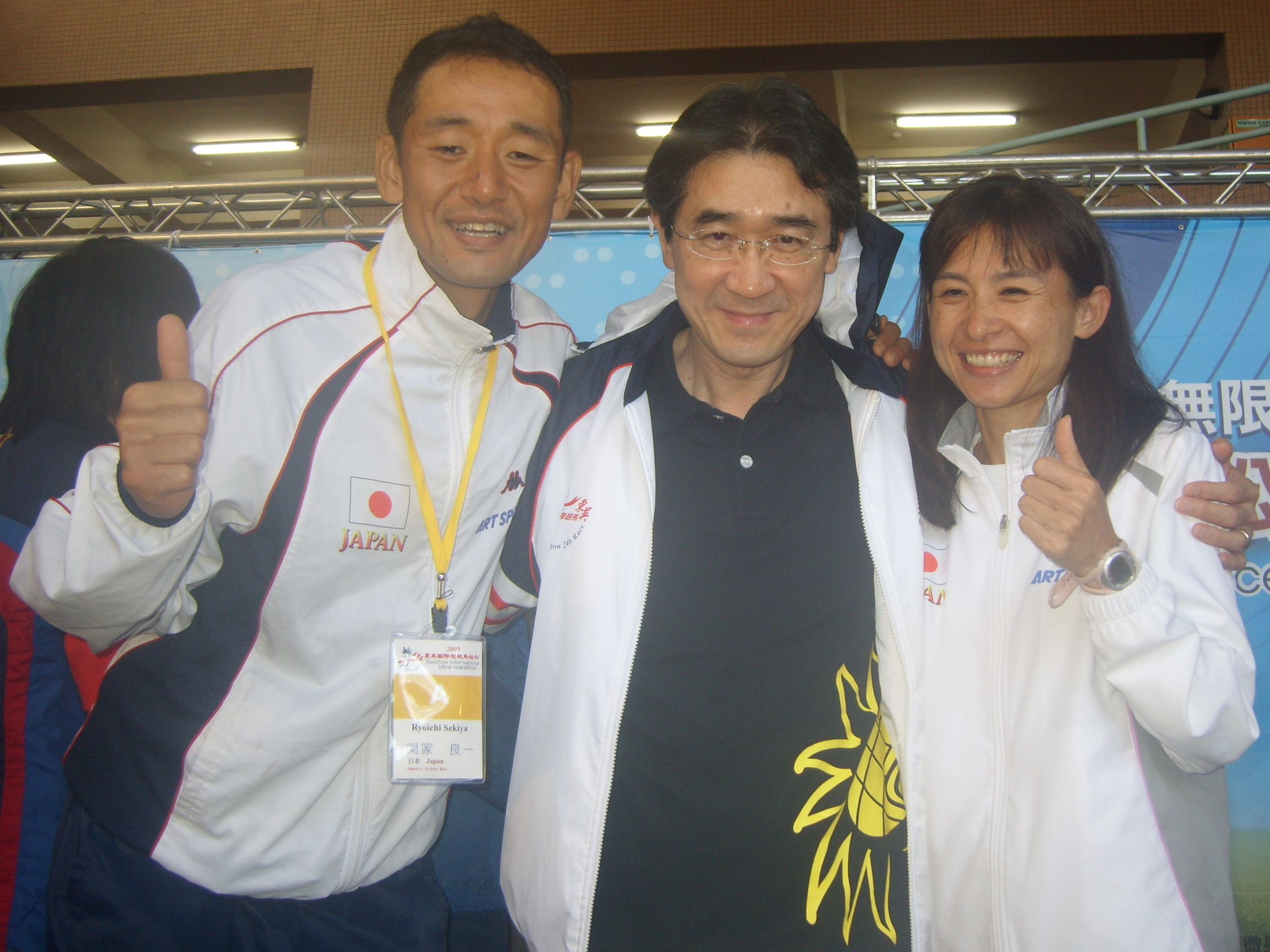
- Ryōichi Sekiya (left) and Mami Kudo (right), winners of the 2009 SCUltraMarathon

Personal information
- Born: 12 February 1967 (age 59) Sagamihara, Japan
- Height: 183 cm (6 ft 0 in)

Sport
- Country: Japan
- Sport: marathon, ultramarathon

Ryōichi Sekiya (關家 良一, Sekiya Ryōichi; born 12 February 1967) is a Japanese ultramarathon and marathon runner. He is the current Asian record holder of the 24-hour run with the distance of 274.884 km (170.805 miles), which he achieved in 2007 at Soochow International Ultra-Marathon. He is a four-time IAU 24 Hour World Championship winner, which makes him the athlete with the most wins in the event.

Other notable wins of Sekiya include eight wins at the IAU-endorsed Soochow International Ultra-Marathon held in Taipei. He first won the event in 2001, and won in seven consecutive years in 2005, 2007, 2008, 2009, 2010, 2011, and 2012 (there was no event in 2006).

Sekiya won the 153 miles (246 km) Spartathlon Ultra Race in Greece in 2002 and 2009.

== International competitions ==
Year	Competition	Venue	Position	Event	Notes
Representing Japan
2008	World Championships	Seoul, South Korea	1st	24-hour run	273.366 kilometres (169.862 miles)
2007	World Championships	Drummondville, Canada	1st	24-hour run	263.562 kilometres (163.770 miles)
2006	World Championships	Taipei, Taiwan	1st	24-hour run	272.936 kilometres (169.595 miles)
2004	World Championships	Brno, Czech Republic	1st	24-hour run	269.085 kilometres (167.202 miles)
2003	World Championships	Uden, Netherlands	2nd	24-hour run	267.223 kilometres (166.045 miles)
