= Camille Herron =

American ultramarathon runner

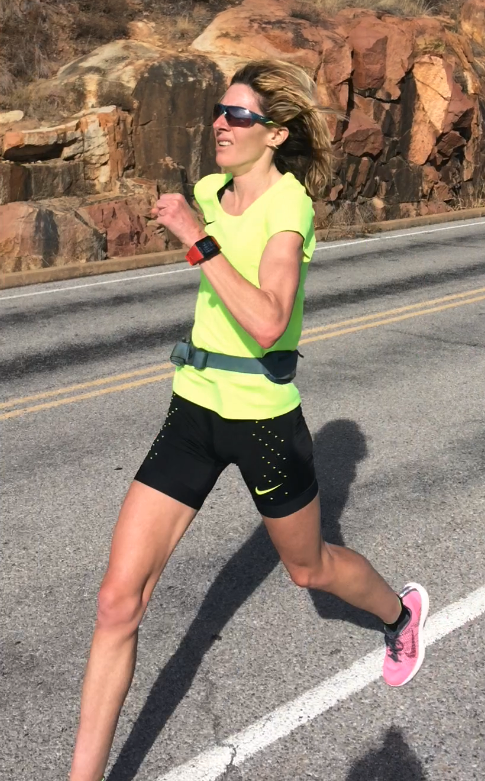
- Herron in 2017

Personal information
- Born: Jacquelyn Camille Herron; December 25, 1981 (age 44) Norman, Oklahoma, U.S.

Sport
- Country: United States
- Sport: Long-distance running
- Events: Marathon and ultramarathon
- Coached by: Conor Holt
Medal record
Women's athletics
Representing the United States
IAU 100 km World Championships
Gold medal – first place	2015 Winschoten	Individual
Gold medal – first place	2015 Winschoten	Team
IAU 50 km World Championships
Gold medal – first place	2015 Doha	Individual
IAU 24 Hour World Championship
Gold medal – first place	2019 Albi	Individual
Gold medal – first place	2019 Albi	Team

Jacquelyn Camille Herron (born December 25, 1981) is an American ultramarathon runner who has won world championships at the 50-kilometer and 100-kilometer distances, and for 24 hour duration. She won the women's race at both the Comrades Marathon in 2017 and the Spartathlon in 2023. She has also set world records and world bests at distances and durations from 50 miles to six days. She was inducted into the RRCA Distance Running Hall of Fame in 2024.

== Early life and education ==
Herron was born in Norman, Oklahoma. She began running in seventh grade, inspired by the 1994 film Forrest Gump. She has said that she related to the main character's ability to hyperfocus on his running. At Westmoore High School in Oklahoma City, she was a three-time all-state cross country runner, a three-time state champion in track and field, and valedictorian.

Herron attended the University of Tulsa, to study biology and compete for its cross country and track and field teams. During her first year, stress fractures disrupted her season. After a redshirt year and transferring to another university, she returned to Tulsa and changed her major to exercise and sports science. As an undergraduate, Herron worked in a lab that focused on bone and exercise research. She was drawn to this line of research due to the stress fractures she had experienced as a young runner. She graduated with a bachelor's degree in exercise and sports science in 2005. Herron obtained a master's degree in exercise and sports science from Oregon State University in 2007, with a thesis on the effects of whole-body vibration on bone recovery in rats.

== Running career ==
=== Marathon ===
Herron returned to competitive running while training with her husband and coach, Conor Holt, after he qualified for the 2004 US Olympic Marathon Trials. She qualified for the Olympic Marathon Trials three times: in 2008, 2012, and 2016. During the 2011 Pan American Games in Guadalajara, she was the highest placed American, finishing 9th. Additionally, she set a Guinness World Record for the fastest marathon by a woman while dressed in a superhero costume.

=== Ultramarathon ===
In 2015, Herron won the US 100 km championship and then both the 50 km and 100 km IAU World Championships. In October 2015, she ran 5:38:41 for 50 miles at the Fall 50 in Sturgeon Bay, Wisconsin, a world best on the road. Herron is the only athlete to win all of the IAU Ultra Road World Championships (50-km, 100-km, and 24hrs), which she accomplished in 2015 and 2019.

In June 2017, Herron won the Comrades Marathon in 6:27:35, becoming the third American to win the race and the first since Ann Trason in 1997. UltraRunning Magazine named her their Female Ultrarunner of the Year for 2017. In November, Herron ran 12:42:40 at the Tunnel Hill 100 in Vienna, Illinois, breaking the 100-mile women's world record by more than an hour.

In February 2019, two weeks after a car accident, Herron won the 100 mile race at the Tarawera Ultramarathon in Rotorua, New Zealand, setting a new course record. In October 2019, she won the IAU 24 Hour World Championship in Albi, France, covering 270.11 km beating her own previous world record of 262.19 km that she set the year before.

In March 2023, Herron competed in the Sri Chinmoy 48 Hour Track Festival in Canberra, Australia. She covered 435.33 kilometers, establishing a women's 48-hour world record. Later that year, she won the women's race for the Spartathlon, a 153-mile race between Athens and Sparta. During this event she set a course record of 22:35:30.

In March 2024 at Lululemon's FURTHER six day race for women in La Quinta, California, Herron ran 901.76 km, exceeding the women's six day record of 883.63 km that was set by Sandy Barwick in 1990. During the race, Herron also set records for numerous intermediate durations and distances from 300 miles to 5 days. Canadian Running counted 12 world records in total from this event.

Herron attributes her success in ultrarunning to her academic training and training approach, which prioritizes short, frequent runs to accumulate a high overall amount of running. Her unusual running gait and arm swing are attributed to an extra bone in her foot and twists in her arm and femur.

=== Awards and honors ===
Herron is a four-time IAU International Ultra Runner of the Year. She is a six-time honoree of the USA Track & Field (USATF) Ruth Anderson Ultrarunner of the Year award. In 2024, she was inducted into the Road Runners Club of America Distance Running Hall of Fame.

=== Sponsorship ===
Between 2016 and 2021 Herron was sponsored by Nike, and from 2021 to 2022 she was sponsored by Hoka. In February 2023, Herron became Lululemon's first ultrarunning ambassador and was officially sponsored by them. She collaborated on product development and initiatives such as the launch of a women's trail shoe and the Lululemon FURTHER program.

On September 23, 2024, Canadian Running reported that two Wikipedia accounts linked to Herron and her husband, Conor Holt, had since 2017 added promotional material into the article about Herron and removed positive information from articles about other ultrarunners, including Kílian Jornet and Courtney Dauwalter. Herron denied the reporting, saying that the allegations were "made up". Holt later issued a statement saying that he alone had created and operated the accounts and that Herron had not been involved or made edits to the articles. On September 26, 2024, Lululemon ended its ambassador partnership with Herron, saying in a statement "We are committed to upholding equitable competition in sport for all and intentionally partner with ambassadors who embody these same values. After careful consideration and conversation, we have decided to end our ambassador partnership with Camille. We want to acknowledge Camille's achievements during our partnership and wish her well in her future endeavours." Outside magazine, Women's Agenda and LetsRun.com reported that the Wikipedia editing was the reason Lululemon ended the partnership. GearJunkie later wrote that Lululemon had acknowledged the termination was "without cause", not because of misconduct.

In September 2026, Herron told GearJunkie that she had been funding her athletic career herself, having been without major corporate sponsors for two years.

== Personal life ==
Herron is married to Conor Holt, who coaches her. She was diagnosed with central auditory processing disorder as a child, and at age 42 she sought out a diagnosis for autism and attention deficit hyperactivity disorder.

In 2026, Herron began publishing paid adult content on OnlyFans. In an interview with GearJunkie, she said the decision was motivated by a longstanding interest in artistic nudity, modeling, and creative expression as well as a means to explore new income sources after losing her major athletic sponsorships.

== Records and best performances ==
Event	Mark	Date	Race and location	Recognition when set	Later developments
50 miles (road)	5:38:41	October 24, 2015	Fall 50, Sturgeon Bay, Wisconsin	World best	Surpassed by Anne Flower in 2025
100 miles	12:42:40	November 11, 2017	Tunnel Hill 100, Vienna, Illinois	World record	Surpassed by Caitriona Jennings in 2025
24 hours	270.11 km	October 26–27, 2019	IAU 24 Hour World Championship, Albi, France	World best	Surpassed by Miho Nakata in 2023
12 hours (track)	150.43 km	February 18, 2023	Raven 24 Hour, Mount Pleasant, South Carolina	Masters world record	
100 miles (track)	12:52:50	February 18, 2023	Raven 24 Hour, Mount Pleasant, South Carolina	Masters world record	
48 hours (track)	435.33 km	March 24–26, 2023	Sri Chinmoy 48-Hour Track Festival, Canberra, Australia	IAU world record	
6 days (road)	901.76 km	March 6–12, 2024	Lululemon FURTHER, La Quinta, California	IAU world best	Surpassed by Stine Rex in 2025
