= Katalin Nagy =

American ultramarathon runner

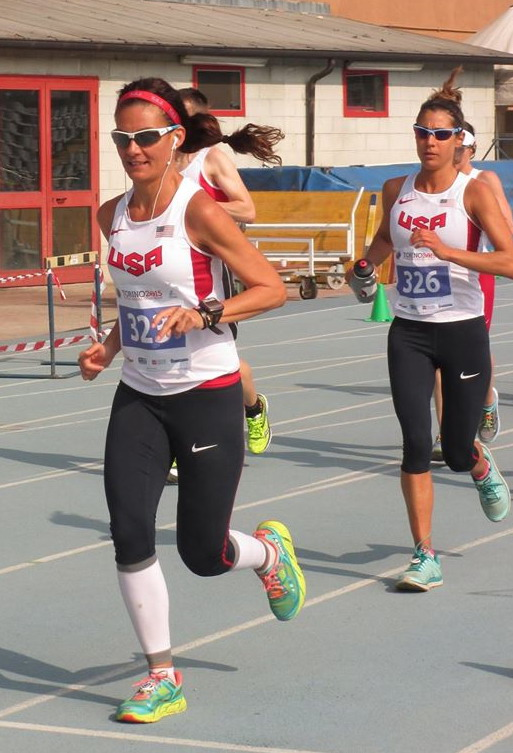
- Katalin Nagy (323) on her way to victory at the IAU 24 Hour World Championships in 2015

Personal information
- Born: May 5, 1979 (age 47)

Sport
- Event: Ultramarathon
Medal record
Representing United States
Ultramarathon
IAU 24 Hour World Championship
Gold medal – first place	2015 Turin
Bronze medal – third place	2017 Belfast

Katalin Nagy (May 5, 1979, in Eger, Hungary) is an ultramarathon runner and member of the USA National 24hr Ultramarathon Team.

== IAU 24 Hour World Champion ==
Nagy first appeared on the ultramarathon scene in 2012 finishing on the podium at the Croom Zoom 50 km Run and winning the 50 mile road run event of the Keys 100 Ultramarathons in Florida. Since then she became the first American female runner to win the IAU 24 Hour World Championship in Turin in April 2015. She also led the US Women's Team to its third consecutive world championship victory with a record breaking team championship performance of 720.046 km with teammates Traci Falbo and Maggie Guterl.

== Ultramarathon career ==
She took her first major international ultramarathon title at Ultrabalaton, a 212 km run around Lake Balaton, Hungary in 2013. Her victory list also includes the South Carolina 24 Hour Race (2014), the Keys 100 Ultramarathons 100 mile event (2014), two wins at the Desert Solstice 24 Hour Track Run (2014, 2015) and a 246 km Athens to Sparta Spartathlon victory with a record time of 25:07:12 ahead of Alyson Venti and former course record holder Szilvia Lubics.

== Personal best performances ==
Event	Result	Year	Notes
50 km	4:10:12	2013	trail
50 mi	6:52:36	2016	trail (course record)
100 km	8:03:58	2017	road
100 mi	14:41:59	2015	road
200 km	19:19:05	2015	track
24 Hour	243.725 km	2014	track
24 Hour	244.495 km	2015	road (world champion)
