= IAU 24 Hour World Championship =

24-hour run competition

The IAU 24 Hour World Championship is an international 24-hour run competition organised by the International Association of Ultrarunners (IAU). Since 2015, the World Championship has alternated annually with the IAU 100 km World Championships.

Preceded in 2001 by the IAU World 24 Hours Track Championships, as a track running event, this competition became the IAU World 24 Hours Challenge in 2003. The road running event was later upgraded to World Championships status after 2006. It is one of the IAU's four main world championship events (alongside the 100 km World Championships, 50 km World Championships, and Trail World Championships) and is the only one with a limited time format, rather than a distance-based one.

The competition has often incorporated the IAU 24 Hour European Championships – a continental event which pre-dates the global competition, having first been held in 1992. The annual schedule has twice been broken: first in 2011, with Brugg, Switzerland failing to proceed as host, and again in 2014, with the agreed host (Plzeň, Czech Republic) being unable to hold the eleventh edition of the competition. The event has mainly been held in Europe: in 2006, Taipei became the first Asian city to hold the races and Drummondville, Quebec followed as the first North American host in 2007.

New Championship records were set at the 2023 Championship, including 301.790 kilometres by Aleksandr Sorokin from Lithuania and 270.363 kilometres by Miho Nakata from Japan.

== Editions ==
Edition in gold was held as the IAU World 24 Hours Track Championships

Ed.	Year	City	Country	Dates	No. of nations	No. of athletes
—	2001	San Giovanni Lupatoto	Italy	22–23 September		
1st	2003	Uden	Netherlands	11–12 October		
2nd	2004	Brno	Czech Republic	23–24 October		
3rd	2005	Wörschach	Austria	16–17 July		
4th	2006	Taipei	Republic of China	25–26 February		
5th	2007	Drummondville, Quebec	Canada	28–29 July		
6th	2008	Seoul	South Korea	18–19 October		
7th	2009	Bergamo	Italy	2–3 May		
8th	2010	Brive-la-Gaillarde	France	13–14 May		
—	~~2011~~	Cancelled				
9th	2012	Katowice	Poland	8–9 September		
10th	2013	Steenbergen	Netherlands	11–12 May	22	261
—	~~2014~~	Cancelled				
11th	2015	Turin	Italy	11–12 April	40	302
12th	2017	Belfast	United Kingdom	1–2 July		
13th	2019	Albi	France	26–27 October		
—	~~2021~~	Cancelled				
14th	2023	Taipei	Taiwan	1–2 December		
15th	2025	Albi	France	25–26 October		

== Medallists ==
=== Men's individual ===
Year	Gold		Silver		Bronze	
2001	Yiannis Kouros (GRE)	275.828	Lubomír Hrmo (SVK)	270.337	Alain Prual (FRA)	259.778
2003	Paul Beckers (BEL)	270.087	Ryōichi Sekiya (JPN)	267.223	Étienne Van Acker (BEL)	264.967
2004	Ryōichi Sekiya (JPN)	269.085	Lubomír Hrmo (SVK)	259.064	Mohamed Magroun (FRA)	257.881
2005	Anatoliy Kruglikov (RUS)	268.065	Ewald Eder (AUT)	263.810	Jens Lukas (GER)	256.368
2006	Ryōichi Sekiya (JPN)	272.936	Mohamed Magroun (FRA)	248.563	Vladimir Bychkov (RUS)	246.098
2007	Ryōichi Sekiya (JPN)	263.562	Mohamed Magroun (FRA)	257.018	Masayuki Otaki (JPN)	253.814
2008	Ryōichi Sekiya (JPN)	273.366	Fabian Hoblea (FRA)	267.174	Yuji Sakai (JPN)	264.389
2009	Henrik Olsson (SWE)	257.042	Ralf Weiss (GER)	244.492	Yuji Sakai (JPN)	242.713
2010	Shingo Inoue (JPN)	273.708	Scott Jurek (USA)	266.577	Ivan Cudin (ITA)	263.841
2012	Michael Morton (USA)	277.543 CR	Florian Reus (GER)	261.718	Ludovic Dilmi (FRA)	257.819
2013	Jon Olsen (USA)	269.675	John Dennis (USA)	262.734	Florian Reus (GER)	259.939
2015	Florian Reus (GER)	263.899	Paweł Szynal (POL)	261.181	Robbie Britton (GBR)	261.140
2017	Yoshihiko Ishikawa (JPN)	270.870	Sebastian Białobrzeski (POL)	267.187	Johan Steene (SWE)	266.515
2019	Aleksandr Sorokin (LTU)	278.972 CR	Tamás Bódis (HUN)	276.222	Olivier Leblond (USA)	275.485
2023	Aleksandr Sorokin (LTU)	301.790	Fotios Zisimopoulos (GRE)	292.254	Andrii Tkachuk (UKR)	284.540
2025	Andrii Tkachuk (UKR)	294.346	Jo Inge Norum (NOR)	285.513	Matti Jonkka (FIN)	283.699

=== Men's team ===
Year	Gold		Silver		Bronze	
2003	Belgium	791.901 CR	Russia	739.569	Japan	729.956
2004	France	745.725	Japan	740.396	Russia	704.876
2005	Japan	734.498	Russia	731.299	Italy	725.897
2006	Japan	755.569	France	724.412	Italy	709.677
2007	Japan	761.842	France	742.206	Germany	673.092
2008	Japan	785.432	France	773.635	Russia	723.287
2009	Japan	706.984	Russia	693.445	Germany	689.111
2010	Japan	778.678	Italy	758.932	United States	757.468
2012	Germany	759.457	France	756.710	United States	754.786
2013	United States	780.552	Japan	752.567	Germany	752.007
2015	United Kingdom	770.777	Australia	752.665	Germany	745.075
2017	Japan	783.159	Poland	763.630	United States	755.458
2019	United States	799.754 CR	Hungary	782.241	France	779.076
2023	Lithuania	813.368	Poland	787.964	United Kingdom	772.127
2025	Finland	797.030	France	791.195	Poland	780.651

=== Women's individual ===
Year	Gold		Silver		Bronze	
2001	Edit Bérces (HUN)	235.029	Irina Reutovich (RUS)	226.781	Irina Koval (RUS)	222.445
2003	Irina Reutovich (RUS)	237.052	Galina Yeremina (RUS)	232.050	Joëlle Semur (FRA)	227.279
2004	Sumie Inagaki (JPN)	237.154	Galina Yeremina (RUS)	235.012	Stephanie Ehret (USA)	225.573
2005	Lyudmila Kalinina (RUS)	242.228	Galina Yeremina (RUS)	239.874	Sumie Inagaki (JPN)	234.803
2006	Sumie Inagaki (JPN)	237.144	Lyudmila Kalinina (RUS)	231.356	Kimie Noto (JPN)	229.146
2007	Lyudmila Kalinina (RUS)	236.848	Brigitte Bec (FRA)	233.137	Galina Yeremina (RUS)	230.288
2008	Anne-Marie Vernet (FRA)	239.685	Anne-Cécile Fontaine (FRA)	239.252	Brigitte Bec (FRA)	229.818
2009	Anne-Cécile Fontaine (FRA)	243.644	Brigitte Bec (FRA)	234.977	Monica Casiraghi (ITA)	223.848
2010	Anne-Cécile Fontaine (FRA)	239.797	Monica Casiraghi (ITA)	231.390	Julia Alter (GER)	230.258
2012	Michaela Dimitriadu (CZE)	244.232	Connie Gardner (USA)	240.385	Emily Gelder (GBR)	238.875
2013	Mami Kudo (JPN)	252.205	Sabrina Little (USA)	244.669	Suzanna Bon (USA)	236.228
2015	Katalin Nagy (USA)	244.495	Traci Falbo (USA)	239.740	Maria Jansson (SWE)	238.964
2017	Patrycja Bereznowska (POL)	259.991 CR WR	Aleksandra Niwińska (POL)	251.078	Katalin Nagy (USA)	248.970
2019	Camille Herron (USA)	270.116 CR WR	Nele Alder-Baerens (GER)	254.288 NR	Patrycja Bereznowska (POL)	247.723
2023	Miho Nakata (JPN)	270.363 CR WR	Olena Shevchenko (UKR)	254.463	Patrycja Bereznowska (POL)	249.541
2025	Sarah Webster (GBR)	278.622 CR WR	Holly Ranson (AUS)	274.172	Miho Nakata (JPN)	271.987

=== Women's team ===
Year	Gold		Silver		Bronze	
2003	Russia	684.858	France	649.303	Japan	628.440
2004	Russia	661.558	Japan	657.610	United States	635.932
2005	Russia	709.573	Japan	654.385	United States	604.514
2006	Russia	671.477	Japan	654.555	France	596.172
2007	Russia	671.329	Japan	641.207	France	614.488
2008	France	708.755	Japan	650.257	Germany	629.868
2009	France	684.078	United States	636.159	Italy	626.386
2010	France	685.800	Italy	658.112	Australia	654.863
2012	United States	694.620	France	666.503	Great Britain	666.461
2013	United States	710.599	Japan	705.582	France	670.698
2015	United States	720.046	Sweden	684.981	Poland	678.468
2017	United States	740.856 CR	Poland	740.234	Germany	689.622
2019	United States	746.132 CR	Poland	721.124	Germany	696.846
2023	Poland	726.552	Japan	702.911	Czech Republic	697.275
2025	Great Britain	768.641	Australia	744.601	Japan	726.983
