= Sydney to Melbourne Ultramarathon =

Australian annual footrace (1983–1991)

The Westfield Sydney to Melbourne Ultramarathon was an annual ultramarathon foot race held between 1983 and 1991. It was sponsored by the Westfield Group, with the start being at Westfield Parramatta shopping centre and the finish at Westfield Doncaster shopping centre (formerly known as "Doncaster Shoppingtown" or "Shoppo"). The event was the brainchild of Martin "Alby" Noonan, a distance runner who at the time was the Marketing and Promotions Manager for the Westfield Doncaster shopping centre.

The five-day event, which ranged in distance from 864 kilometres (537 miles) to 1,060 kilometres (660 miles), was regarded as one of the toughest in the world. It was particularly notable for having been won in 1983 by almost unknown 61-year old potato farmer Cliff Young from Beech Forest, Victoria.

Yiannis Kouros won the men's race five times. In 1988, the race organiser challenged him to start 12 hours behind the rest of the field. Kouros overtook his competitors and won the race with a one-hour lead over New Zealander Dick Tout.

The first woman to compete was Australian Caroline Vaughan who ran in 1984. Vaughan did not finish the race. In 1985, three women competed and finished: British ultramarathon runner Eleanor Robinson (then Eleanor Adams), Donna Hudson of the US and Australian Margaret Smith. Robinson won the women's race three times.

The final running of the event in 1991 included prize money ($60,000 for first place), a handicapping system and a change to the course. Yiannis Kouros did not enter the race as he demanded a large fee to appear, and claimed to plan a competing race with the same course. Due to this, the 1991 edition was a commercial failure, and after Westfield Group withdrew their support the race was ceased.

== Results ==
=== 1983 ===
1. Cliff Young: 5d 15h 04m
2. George Perdon: 6d 01h 00m
3. Siggy Bauer: 6d 05h 00m

6 finishers

=== 1984 ===
1. Geoff Molloy: 6d 04h 02m
2. John Hughes: 6d 06h 00m
3. Wal McCrorie: 6d 16h 21m

9 finishers

=== 1985 ===
Men's race

1. Yiannis Kouros: 5d 05h 07m
2. Siggy Bauer: 6d 05h 46m
3. Brian Bloomer: 6d 17h 20m

Women's race

1. Eleanor Robinson: 8d 00h 30m
2. Donna Hudson: 8d 11h 57m
3. Margaret Smith: 8d 16h 28m

11 finishers

=== 1986 ===
Men's race

1. Dušan Mravlje: 6d 12h 38m
2. Brian Bloomer: 7d 04h 53m
3. Patrick Macke: 7d 13h 02m

Women's race

1. Eleanor Robinson: 7d 17h 58m
2. Donna Hudson: 8d 06h 15m
3. Christine Barrett: 8d 22h 30m

9 finishers

=== 1987 ===
Men's race

1. Yiannis Kouros: 5d 14h 47m
2. Patrick Macke: 6d 17h 21m
3. Dick Tout: 6d 22h 19m

Women's race

1. Cynthia Cameron: 8d 10h 55m
2. Mary Hanudel: 8d 12h 44m

16 finishers

=== 1988 ===
Men's race

1. Yiannis Kouros: 5d 19h 14m
2. Dick Tout: 6d 11h 18m
3. Dusan Mravlje: 6d 14h 10m

Women's race

1. Eleanor Robinson: 7d 10h 5m
2. Sandra Barwick: 8d 04h 10m

23 finishers

=== 1989 ===
1. Yiannis Kouros: 5d 02h 27m
2. David Standeven: 5d 13h 55m
3. Kevin Mansell: 5d 22h 59m

19 finishers

=== 1990 ===
Men's race

1. Yiannis Kouros: 5d 23h 55m
2. Bryan Smith: 6d 09h 45m
3. Peter Quirk: 6d 11h 40m

Women's race

1. Sandra Barwick: 7d 04h 46m

20 finishers

=== 1991 ===
1. Bryan Smith: 6d 12h 50m (24h handicap)
2. Tony Collins: 7d 04h 17m (12h handicap)
3. Andrew Law: 7d 09h 32m (12h handicap)
4. Maurice Taylor: 6d 23h 22m (24h handicap)
5. Kevin Mansell: 7d 02h 26m (24h handicap)

11 finishers
