= Michael Morton (runner) =

American ultramarathon runner

Michael "Mike" Morton (born 1971) is an American ultramarathon runner, former Navy diver (United States Navy) and retired Delta Force operator. He is best known for winning the IAU 24 Hour World Championship in 2012 while setting the American record for distance covered in 24 hours.

== Early life and military career ==
Morton was born in Trenton, Michigan. He began running competitively in high school. After graduating in 1990, he enlisted in the United States Navy and served approximately 12 years as a Navy Diver. In 2001, he transferred to the U.S. Army, completed Special Forces training, and served with 1st Special Forces Operational Detachment – Delta, commonly known as "Delta Force", with multiple deployments to Iraq and Afghanistan.

== Athletic career ==
=== Marathon and ultramarathon running ===
Morton had two highly successful periods in ultrarunning: 1994–1998 and 2010–2013. In 1997, he became the first non-Californian to win the Western States Endurance Run and set a course record. After a hiatus due to injury and military service, he returned strongly. In 2012, he had an undefeated season in major races, setting course records at the Long Haul 100, Umstead 100, and Keys 100, and winning the Badwater Ultramarathon.

He capped the year by winning the IAU 24 Hour World Championship in Katowice, Poland, running 277.543 kilometres (172.457 miles) and breaking the previous American record by nearly seven miles.

For his 2012 achievements, Morton was named Ultrarunner of the Year by both Ultrarunning Magazine and USA Track & Field. In 2024, he was inducted into the American Ultrarunning Hall of Fame.
