= Connie Gardner =

American ultramarathon runner

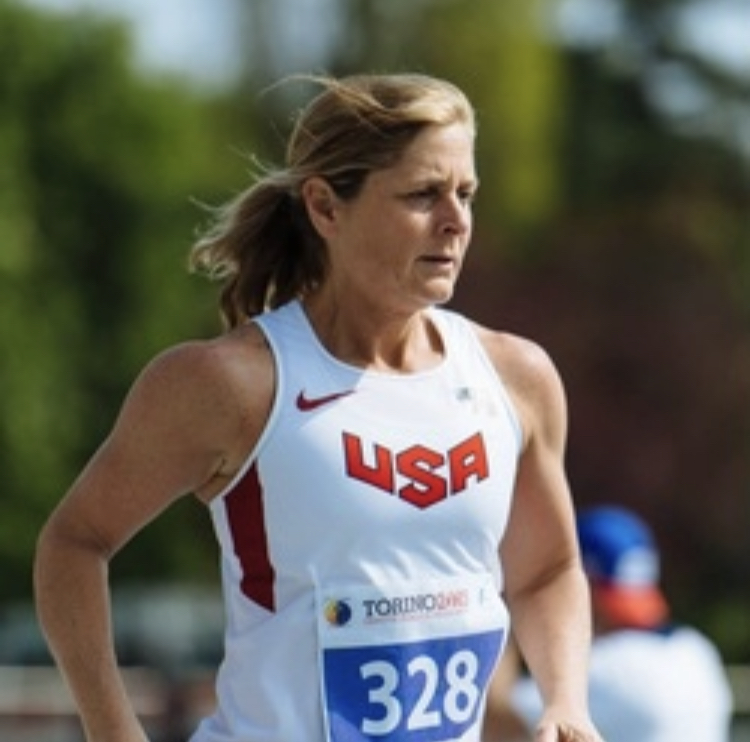
- Gardner runs for the USA in an international race

Personal information
- Born: 6 November 1963 (age 62)
- Height: 5 ft 6 in (1.68 m)
- Weight: 130 lb (59 kg)

Sport
- Country: United States
- Event: Ultramarathon

Connie Gardner (born 1963) is an American ultramarathoner and member of the USATF. She has competed in ultramarathons all over the world, and has won 11 USATF national championships. Her ultramarathon victories include the Burning River 100 Mile Trail Race (2008, 2009, 2011, 2012), the Mohican 100 Mile Trail Race (2001, 2007, 2008, 2012, 2016), the NorthCoast 24-Hour Endurance Run (2010, 2011), the Tussey Mountainback 50 Miler (2011), and the JFK 50 Miler (2002, 2004, 2008).

In September 2012, Gardner set an American record by running 149.368 miles at the IAU 24 Hour World Championship in Katowice, Poland, earning herself the silver medal and leading the women's team to gold.

She was the 2003 USA Track and Field Ultrarunner of the Year and later the 2011 USA Track and Field Masters Ultrarunner of the Year. She won three national titles in three consecutive months in 2011 (100 mile trail championship in August, 24 hour road championship completing 144 miles in September, 50 mile road championship in October).

== Personal life ==
Born Constance Margaret John on November 6, 1963 to Dr. James EA John and Constance Maxwell John, Gardner began running in elementary school in the DC area. She attended Olentangy High School in Columbus, Ohio, where she competed for the school's first girls cross country team. She also ran on their track and field's 4x800 relay team, who finished runners up at the Class AA State of Ohio finals in 1980 and 1981. She then attended the University of Massachusetts and majored in Sports Management, where she was a member of the university's rowing team. While at the University of Massachusetts, Gardner ran her first marathon at the age of 17, finishing in 4:11. Gardner is currently a sales associate at Second Sole Akron, where she has been employed since 2007 and continues to cater to the needs of Northeast Ohio's devoted runners. She coached at Archbishop Hoban High School from 2015-2020, and now coaches at Bryant and Stratton College. Gardner is a lover of animals and frequently homes rescue dogs, housing up to 5 at a time. She currently resides in Akron, Ohio with 1 of her 2 daughters.

== Career highlights ==
- 2011 USA Track and Field Masters Ultrarunner of the Year
- Won 3 national titles in 3 consecutive months, 100 mile trail championship August 2011, 24 hour road championship completing 144 miles in September 2011, 50 mile road championship October 2011
- 2003 USA Track and Field Ultrarunner of the Year
- 9 time USA Track and Field National Champion in distances ranging from 50 miles to 24 hours in less than a decade.
- Ran 145 miles in one day at North Coast 24 Hour National Championship 2007
- Ran 184 miles across New Jersey in 2016 (starring in the documentary Running the 184)

== National titles ==
11-time USA Track and Field National Champion

- Edmund Fitzgerald 100k Road Race 2002
- Olander Park 100M Road Race 2003
- Olander Park 100M Road Race 2004
- Rocky Raccoon 100M Trail Race 2006
- Ultracentric 24 Hour Endurance Run 2007
- North Coast 24 Hour Endurance Run 2010
- Burning River 100M Trail Race 2011
- North Coast 24 Hour Endurance Run 2011
- Burning River 100M Trail Race 2012
- Tussey Mountainback 50M Road Race 2011
- Tussey Mountainback 50M Road Race 2012

== Personal records ==
- 2 Mile - 11:13 (2008)
- 5K - 19:01 (1999)
- 4 Mile - 25:53 (2008)
- 5 Mile - 32:01 (2009)
- 10K - 39:58 (2008)
- 15K - 1:04:26 (2008)
- 10 Mile - 1:06:10 (2003)
- Half Marathon - 1:27:53 (2001)
- Marathon - 3:04:03 (2004)
- 50K - 3:50:17 (2009)
- 50 Miles - 6:56:20 (2009)
- 100k - 8:14 (2007)
- 100 Miles - 15:48:04 (2004)
- 24 Hour - 149.368 miles (2012)
