= Grand Union Canal 145 mile Race =

Ultramarathon race in the United Kingdom

The Grand Union Canal Race (GUCR) is an ultramarathon run from the centre of Birmingham to the centre of London along the Grand Union Canal. Competitors are required to complete the 145-mile (233 km) distance within a time limit of 45 hours. Resting for more than 40 minutes at a time is not permitted. The maximum number of competitors is 100 and is very quickly reached.

The race record is held by Dan Lawson who completed the course in 22 hours 15 minutes in May 2015.

== Results ==
Winners

Year	Winner	Time (Hours:Minutes)	Country
2024	Chris Kelly	24:02	Great Britain
2023	Matthew Ma	27:52	Great Britain
2022	Samantha Amend	24:45	Great Britain
2021	Alexander Whearity	23:25	Great Britain
2020	Cancelled due to the COVID-19 pandemic		
2019	Alexander Whearity	25:08	Great Britain
2018	Paul Maskell	25:35	Great Britain
2017	Sergey Ionov	25:54	Russia
2016	Andy Jordan	25:49	Great Britain
2015	Dan Lawson	22:15	Great Britain
2014	Pat Robbins	26:20	Great Britain
2013	James Elson	29:10	Great Britain
2012	Debbie Martin-Corsani	28:01	Great Britain
2011	Pat Robbins	25:37	Great Britain
2010	Pat Robbins	26:24	Great Britain
2009	Pat Robbins	26:24	Great Britain
2008	Pat Robbins	27:09	Great Britain
2007	Tim Holsgrove	29:39	Great Britain
2006	Matt Giles	29:02	Great Britain
2005	Bob Brown/John Kinder	29:39	Great Britain
2004	Gary Wale	32:36	Great Britain
2003	Claude Hardel	27:35	France
2002	Robert Goodwin	30:11	Great Britain
2001	Chris Fanning	31:05	Ireland
2000	Phil Redden	34:08	Great Britain
1999	Neville Stonehouse	33:16	Great Britain
1998	Rod Palmer	28:58	Great Britain
1997	Rod Palmer	31:11	Great Britain
1993	Dick Kearn	32:50	Great Britain
