= Self-Transcendence 12+24 Hour Race Basel =

Coordinates: 47.536352°N 7.619374°E

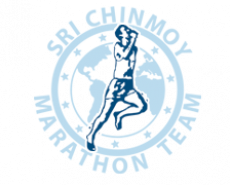
- Logo
- Date: May
- Location: Basel, Switzerland
- Event type: Ultramarathon
- Established: 1988
- Website: ch.srichinmoyraces.org

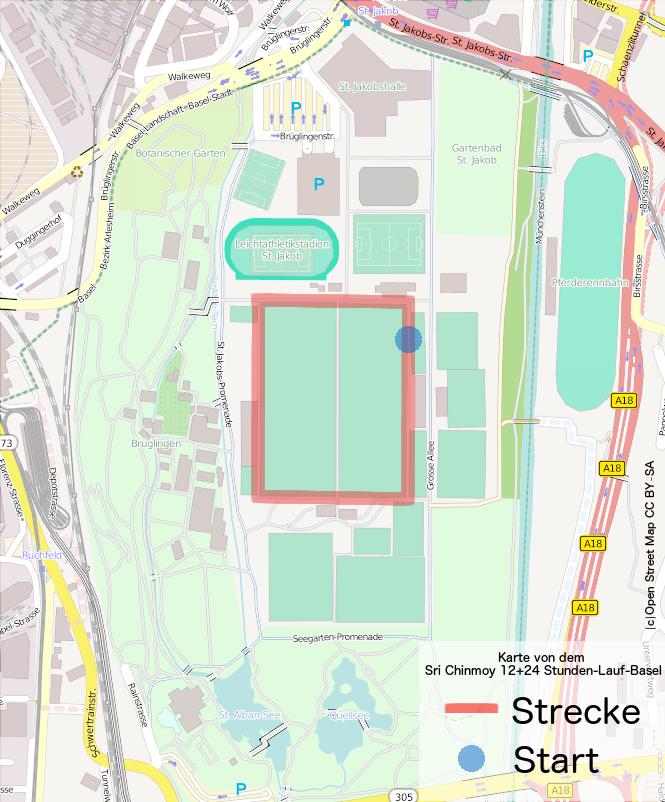
Card

The 12+24 Hour Race Basel is an Ultramarathon race in Basel, Switzerland. The run takes place annually in May, organized by the Sri Chinmoy Marathon Team. It is held on the Sports Facilities St. Jakob on a 1.1 kilometer route (0.68 miles).

== History ==
Since 1988 the race has been held in Basel. It regularly holds the 12 and 24 hour Swiss championships, and has held the European Championships several times.

== Records ==
1998 Yiannis Kouros run 290.22 kilometers. It is the course record and also currently the 24-hour world record on the road. Denise Zimmermann holds the national record in 24-hour running. They improved in twice and bring him back once in Basel.
