= Kimie Noto =

Japanese ultramarathon runner (born 1952)

Kimie Noto (Née Funada)
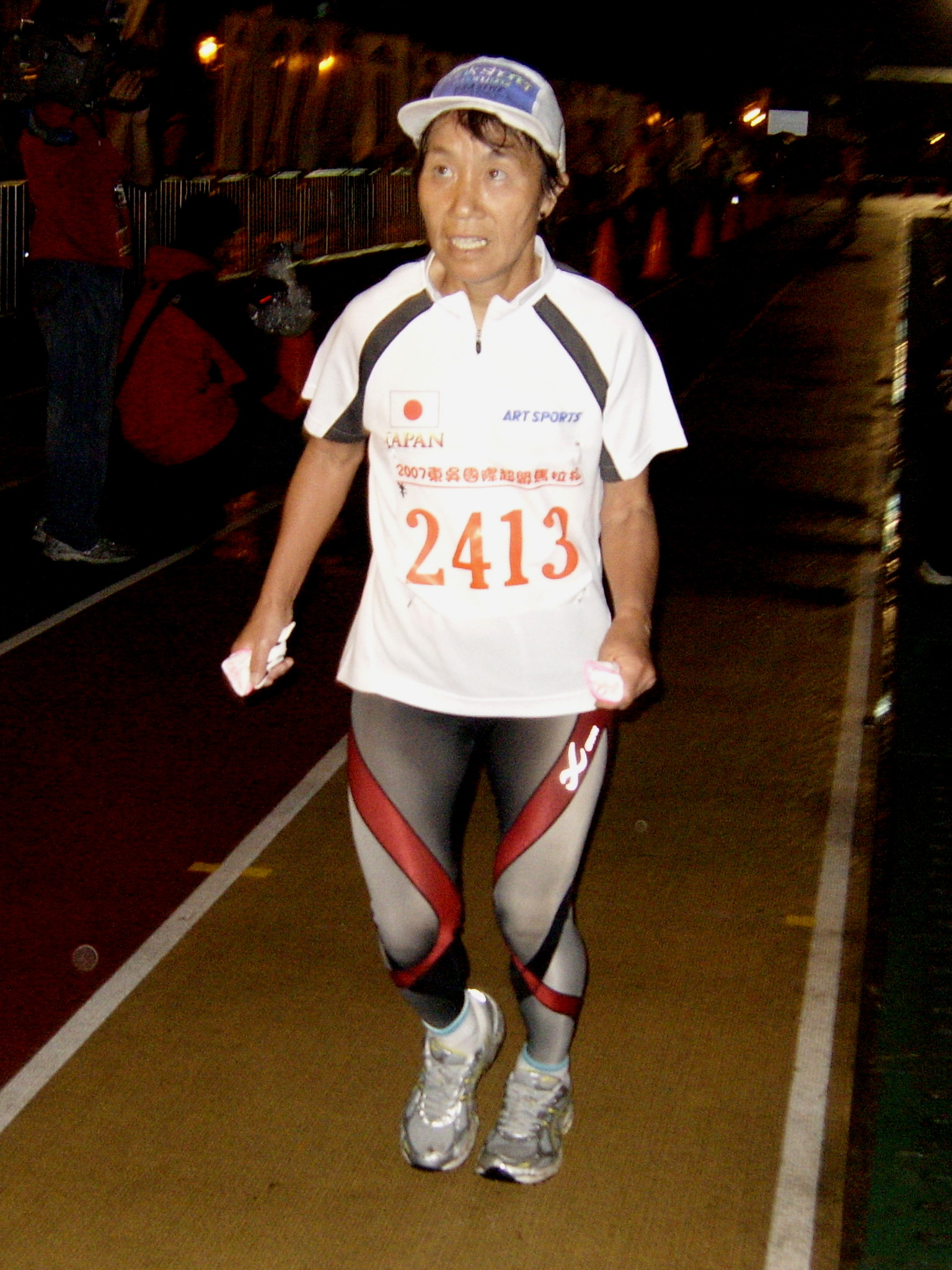

Personal information
- Born: 1952 (age 73–74) Hokkaido
- Height: 149 cm (4 ft 11 in)

Sport
- Country: Japan
- Sport: ultramarathon
Medal record
Ultramarathon
Representing Japan
IAU 24 Hour World Championship
Bronze medal – third place	2006 Taipei	24-hour run Individual
Silver medal – second place	2006 Taipei	24-hour run Team
Silver medal – second place	2005 Wörschach	24-hour run Team

Kimie Noto (能登貴美枝, Noto Kimie; born 1952, née Kimie Funada) is a Japanese ultramarathon runner, bronze medalist at 2006 IAU 24-Hour Run World Championship, and team silver medalist at 2005 IAU 24-Hour Run World Championship.

In the Spartathlon in Greece, she finished 15 times from 1995 to 2011, taking the female 1st place 2 times (2004, 2005), female 2nd place 4 times (1997, 1998, 1999, 2001) and female 3rd place 3 times (1995, 1996, 2007). (Her name appears on the list in her maiden name of Kimie Funada before 2002)

== International competitions ==
Year	Competition	Venue	Position	Event	Notes
Representing Japan
2006	World Championships	Taipei, Republic of China	3rd	24-hour run Road Individual	229.146 km
2006	World Championships	Taipei, Republic of China	2nd	24-hour run Road Team	
2005	World Championships	Wörschach, Austria	2nd	24-hour run Road Team	654.413 km (Noto 234.803 km)
