= Miho Nakata =

Japanese ultramarathon runner (born 1989)

Personal information
- Born: Miho Nakata; 24 April 1989 (age 37) Japan

Sport
- Country: Japan
- Sport: Sport of athletics Ultrarunning
- Event(s): Marathon and Ultramarathon

Achievements and titles
- Personal best(s): Marathon: 2:39:51; 50K: 3:33:47; 50 Miles: 6:02:04; 100K: 7:19:12; 12 hrs: 147.600 km (91.714 miles); 100 miles: 13:09:09; 24 hrs: 270.363 km (167.996 miles)
Medal record
Women's athletics
Representing Japan
IAU 24 Hour World Championship
Gold medal – first place	2023 Taipei	Individual
Silver medal – second place	2023 Taipei	Team

Miho Nakata (born 24 April 1989) is a Japanese ultramarathon and marathon runner. She won the 2023 IAU 24 Hour World Championship and set an IAU 24-hour run world record.

== Career ==
Nakata began running marathons competitively in 2012. She recorded her highest World Marathon Majors placing of 18th at the 2022 Tokyo Marathon.

Nakata struggled with injuries in 2023. In May, she won the 2023 River Road Foot Race 512 km (318 miles) overall by over 5 hours with a time of 3d 4:03:36.

In December 2023, Nakata won the 2023 IAU 24 Hour World Championship in a new world record distance of 270.363 km (167.996 miles). She broke the previous record set by Camille Herron by just 246 metres (807 ft). She beat all but four men in the race.
