= Johan Steene =

Swedish ultramarathon runner

Johan Steene (born 1973) is a Swedish ultramarathon runner, most notable for winning the 2018 Big Dog's Backyard Ultra, at which he completed 68 laps or 283.335 miles of the course in 67 hours 48 minutes and 36 seconds, thus setting a new record on the course and beating notable ultrarunner Courtney Dauwalter. In 2017, Steene took a bronze medal in the IAU 24 Hour World Championship, after completing 266.515 km in 24 hours.
