= Peter Quirk =

Personal information
- Born: 26 January 1961 (age 65)
- Original team: Narrandera
- Height: 183 cm (6 ft 0 in)
- Weight: 82 kg (181 lb)

Playing career^{1}
Years	Club	Games (Goals)
1987	Sydney Swans	7 (1)
- ^{1} Playing statistics correct to the end of 1987.

Peter Quirk (born 26 January 1961) is a former Australian rules footballer who played with the Sydney Swans in the Victorian Football League (VFL).

Quirk came from Riverina Football League club Narrandera. He made seven VFL appearances for the Swans, all in the second half of the 1987 season. This included Sydney's round 17 win over Essendon, when they amassed a club record score of 236 points, just two short of then league record He had also played the previous week, when Sydney scored 201 against the West Coast Eagles.

He finished third in the 1990 Sydney to Melbourne Ultramarathon.
