= Cliff Young Australian 6-day race =

Ultramarathon race in Victoria, Australia

The Cliff Young Australian 6 Day Race was an ultramarathon race that took place in Colac, Victoria. One of a small handful of six-day races around the world, the Cliff Young has had many fine performances, culminating in November 2005 with Yiannis Kouros, arguably the best multiday runner in the world, setting a new six-day record. It started in 1983 and was renamed in 2004 after Cliff Young, a Colac farmer and winner of the inaugural Sydney to Melbourne Westfield's Ultramarathon in May 1983.

== History ==
After Cliff Young (a potato farmer) won the ultramarathon in 1983, the City of Colac was inspired to stage a 1000-mile race in Cliff's honour - the 1983 Cliff Young Colac 1000 which started in Melbourne and ended in the Colac Memorial Square.

In the following year, the City of Colac announced its decision to stage a six-day race. A 400-metre track was created in the Memorial square and named in his honour. Initially named the 1984 Colac Ultra Marathon, it later became known as the Australian Six Day Race - Colac. Fourteen runners entered the inaugural race including the great Yiannis Kouros and British multiday runner Eleanor Adams-Robinson. Kouros easily won, covering over 1022 km, setting a new world record and Adams-Robinson also broke 11 world records.

The race was renamed in early 2004 in honour of Cliff Young, who died on the 2nd of November 2003.

In 2005, at the age of 49, Yiannis Kouros returned to the recently renamed race and again demonstrated his unparalleled capacity by setting a new Six Day World Record by covering just over 1036 km, breaking the course record and set new world record times for covering 500 km and 1000 km in his age group.

The event has not been held since 2005, despite an effort from Australian marathon runner Lee Troop to revive the race in 2008.

== Other 6 Day races ==
- 6jours-antibes.com - Antibes (FRA)
- cosibullig.de - Erkrath GER)
- SriChinmoyRaces.org - Self-Transcendence (USA)
- Ultradistance.za - Toyota (RSA)
- Australian 6 Day Race - (Australia, South Australia)
