= Sumie Inagaki =

Japanese ultramarathon runner (born 1966)

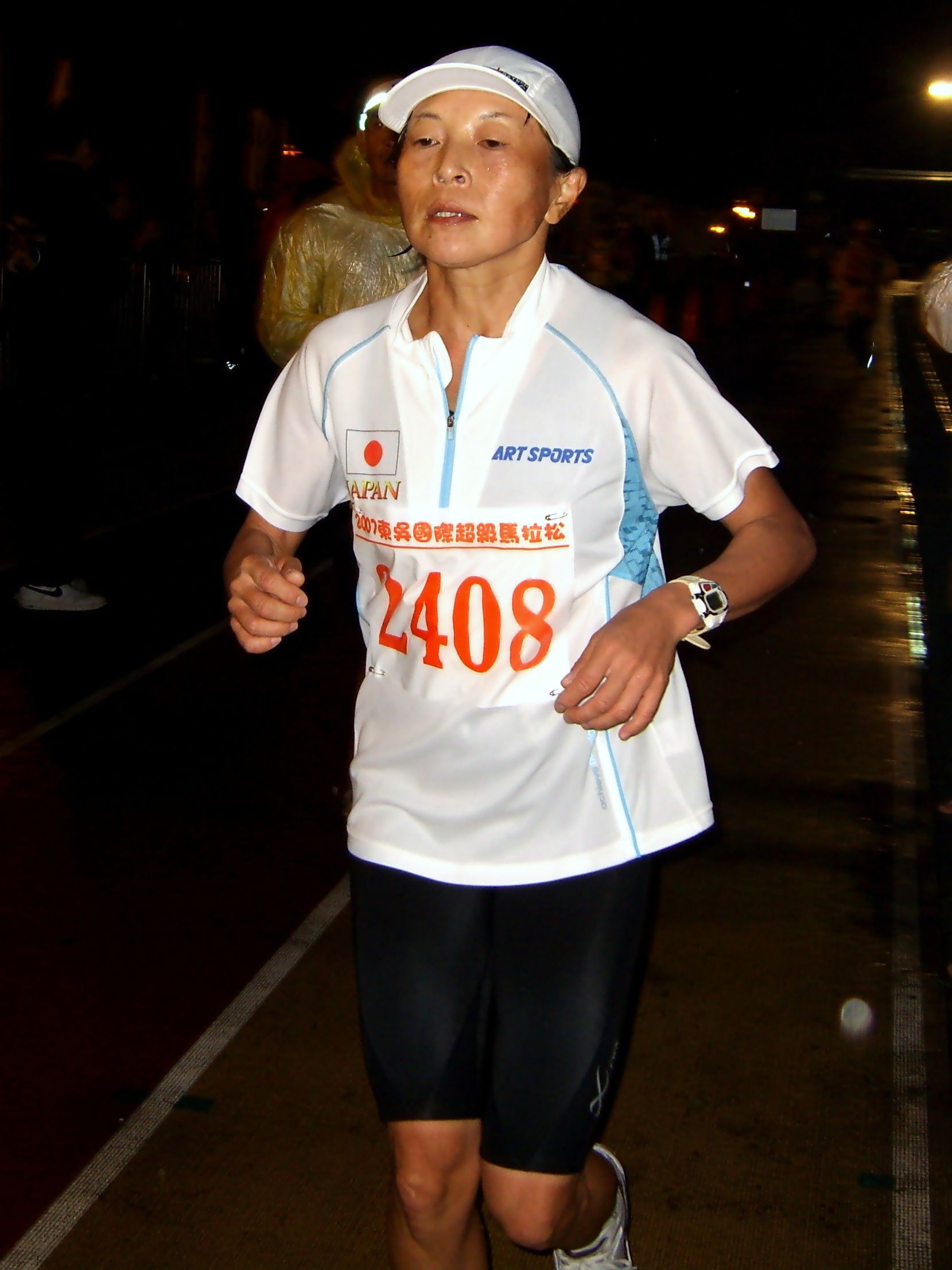
- Inagaki at the 2007 Soochow International 24-Hour Ultra-Marathon

Personal information
- Born: April 6, 1966 (age 60) Hokkaido
- Height: 154 cm (5 ft 1 in)
- Weight: 46 kg (101 lb)

Sport
- Country: Japan
- Sport: ultramarathon
Medal record
Representing Japan
ultramarathon
IAU 24 Hour World Championship
Gold medal – first place	2006 Taipei	24-hour run
Gold medal – first place	2004 Brno	24-hour run

Spartathlon winner 2006 and 2009

Sumie Inagaki (稲垣寿美恵, Inagaki Sumie; born 6 April 1966) is a Japanese ultramarathon runner from Hokkaido. Inagaki holds current women's world record in 24-hour run Indoor (240.631 kilometres (149.521 miles), Espoo FIN, Jan 2011), and in 48-hour run Track (397.103 kilometres (246.748 miles), Surgeres FRA, May 2010). She is a two time female winner of IAU 24-Hour Run World Championship. She was the female winner of 2006 and 2009 Spartathlon, and the female winner of 2011 and 2012 Badwater Ultramarathon.

== Competition record ==
=== International competitions ===
Year	Competition	Venue	Position	Event	Notes
Representing Japan
2006	World Championships	Taipei, Republic of China	1st	24-hour run	237.144 km
2004	World Championships	Brno, Czech Republic	1st	24-hour run	237.154 km

=== Non-championship races ===
2014

- 1st place in 24-hour run Finland (240.6 km)
- 1st place in 48-hour run France (397.1 km)

2013

- 1st place in 24-hour run Finland (220.7 km)
- 1st place in 48-hour run Sweden (331 km)

2012

- 1st place in 24-hour run Finland (228.173 km)
- 1st place among women (11th in general) in Badwater Ultramarathon (29:53:9)
- 3rd place among women in Soochow International Ultramarathon (221.555 km)

2011

- 1st place in 24-hour Indoor run Finland, setting the world record of 240.631 km
- 1st place among women (9th in general) in Badwater Ultramarathon (28:49:27)

2010

- 1st place in 24-hour run Finland
- 1st place in 48-hour Track run World Championship, setting a new world record of 397.103 km

2009

- 1st place in 48-hour run World Championship, setting a new world record of 382.718 km

2006

- 1st place in 24-hour run World Championship
- 1st place in 48-hour run World Championship, setting the world record of 382.418 km

== Personal life ==
After graduating from college, Inagaki worked at a kindergarten. She eventually started taking yoga lessons, and now she is an aerobics and yoga instructor.

Inagaki states that ultramarathon is not her job, but what she loves to do, where she finds the joy of life. "What I do is a fun run. I train as if I were having a picnic."
