= Cliff Young (athlete) =

Australian ultramarathon runner (1922–2003)

Cliff Young OAM
- Born: Albert Ernest Clifford Young; 8 February 1922; Victoria, Australia
- Died: 2 November 2003 (aged 81); Queensland, Australia
- Known for: Winner of the 1983 Sydney to Melbourne Ultramarathon at the age of 61

Albert Ernest Clifford Young OAM (8 February 1922 – 2 November 2003) was an Australian athlete from Beech Forest, Victoria. A farmer, he became notable for his unexpected win of the inaugural Sydney to Melbourne Ultramarathon in 1983 at 61 years of age.

== Early life ==
Young was born the eldest son and the third of seven children of Mary and Albert Ernest Young on 8 February 1922. He grew up on a farm in Beech Forest in southwestern Victoria. The family farm was approximately 2,000 acres (810 ha) with approximately 2,000 sheep. As a child, Young helped to round up the stock on foot, as the family were very poor during the Great Depression and could not afford horses.

== Running and ultramarathons ==
In 1979, at the age of 56, he competed in the Adidas Sun Superun 16 kilometres (9.9 mi) race which crossed the West Gate Bridge in Melbourne. He ran the race at a very respectable 64 minutes and was interviewed by the media.

Cliff then ran the Melbourne Marathon with a time of 3:21:41 in 1979. He went on to compete in the race again in 1980, 1981, and 1982; he set a personal best of 3:02:53 in 1980, aged 58.

In late 1982, after training for months around the Otway Ranges, Young attempted to break New Zealander Siegfried "Ziggy" Bauer's then world record for 1,000 miles (1,600 km) of 11 days and 23 hours. The attempt took place in Colac's Memorial Square. Young had to abandon the world record attempt just after halfway at 805 kilometres (500 mi). Reflecting on the failed attempt, Young wrote that he and his support team were inexperienced and ill-prepared.

In 1983, then aged 61 years old, Young won the inaugural Westfield Sydney to Melbourne Ultramarathon, a distance of 875 kilometres (544 mi). The race was run between what were then Australia's two largest Westfield shopping centres: Westfield Parramatta in Sydney and Westfield Doncaster in Melbourne. Young arrived to compete in overalls and work boots (though he ran the race in a new pair of runners somebody gave him), without his dentures (later saying that they rattled when he ran). He ran at a slow and loping pace and trailed the pack by a large margin at the end of the first day. While the other competitors stopped to sleep for six hours, Young mistakenly woke up at 2 am, several hours earlier than intended, and began running, taking the lead while the other runners slept. Young then decided to avoid sleep as a strategy, and finished the rest of the race without sleeping at all, eventually finishing in 1st place 10 hours faster than the runner who came in second.

Before running the race, he had told the press that he had previously run for two to three days straight rounding up sheep in gumboots. He said afterwards that during the race he imagined he was running after sheep trying to outrun a storm. The Westfield run took him five days, fifteen hours and four minutes, almost two days faster than the previous record for any run between Sydney and Melbourne, at an average speed of 6.5 kilometres per hour (4.0 mph). All six competitors who finished the race broke the old record. Upon being awarded the prize of A$10,000 (equivalent to $36,011 in 2022), Young said that he did not know there was a prize and that he felt bad accepting it, as each of the other five runners who finished had worked as hard as he did—so he gave A$3,000 to 41-year-old Joe Record and A$4,000 to the other runners, keeping only A$3,000 for himself. Despite attempting the event again in later years, Young was unable to repeat this performance or claim victory again.

Young became very popular after this "tortoise and hare" feat, so much so that in Colac, Victoria, the Cliff Young Australian Six-Day Race was established that same year. In 1984, he was awarded the Medal of the Order of Australia "for long distance running".

In 1997, at age 75, he made an attempt to beat Ron Grant's around-Australia record. He completed 6,520 kilometres of the 16,000-kilometre run, but had to pull out because his only crew member became ill.

In 2000, Young achieved a world age record in a six-day race in Victoria.

== Personal life ==
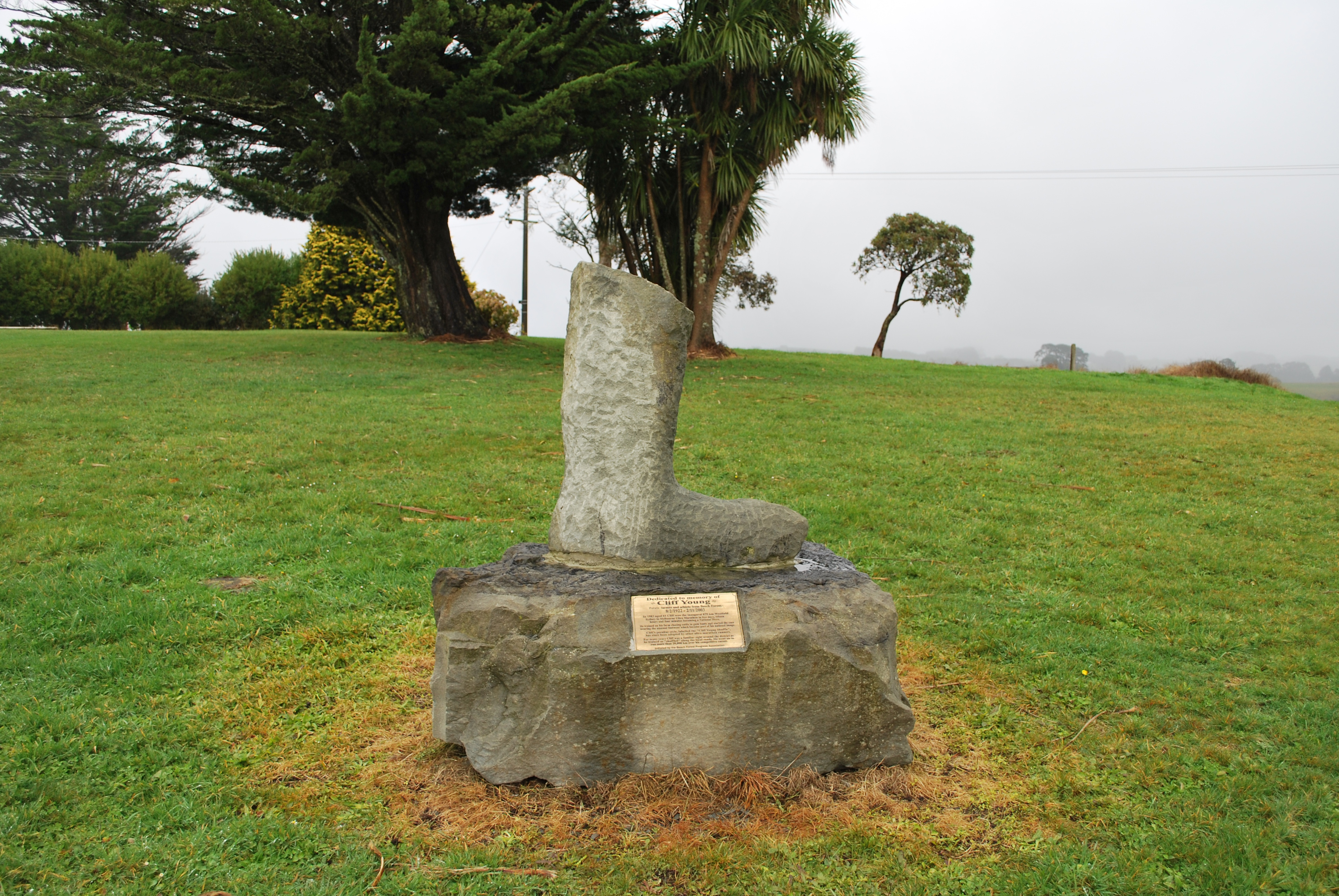
Memorial to Young in the form of a gumboot in Beech Forest, Victoria

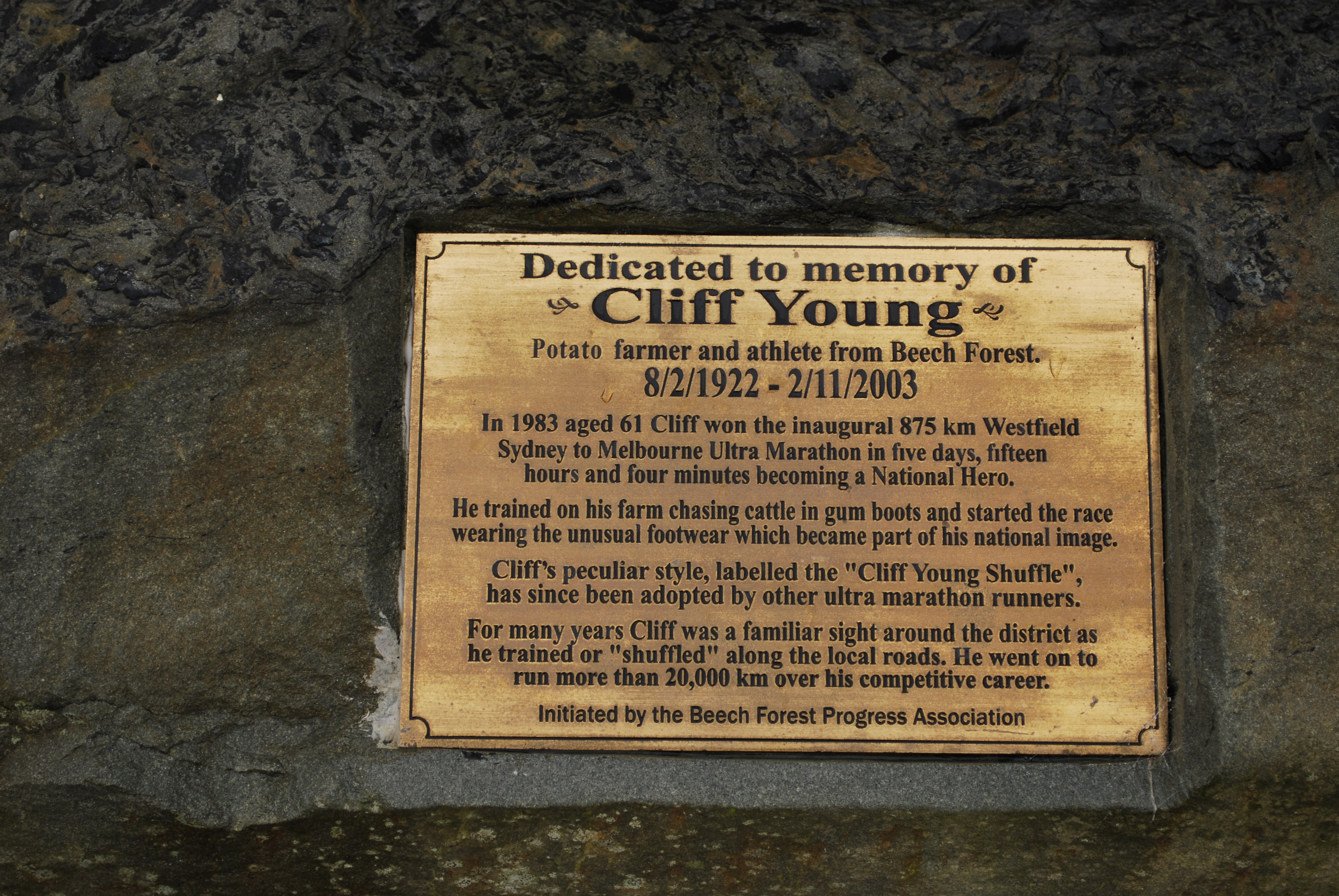
Cliff Young memorial plaque

Young was a vegetarian from 1973 until his death. He lived at the family home with his mother and brother Sid. Cliff had never married, but after the 1983 race, at 62 years of age, he married 23-year-old Mary Howell. The race sponsor, Westfield, hosted the wedding for the entertainment of shoppers. Young and Howell divorced five years later. Renowned for his ungainly running style, Young ran more than 20,000 kilometres during his competitive career. After five years of illness and several strokes, he died of cancer at the age of 81 on 2 November 2003 at his home in Queensland.

A memorial in the shape of a gumboot in Beech Forest is dedicated to Young and the Cliff Young Drive and Cliff Young Park there are named after him.

== "Young Shuffle" ==
The "Young Shuffle" has been adopted by some ultramarathon runners because it expends less energy. At least three winners of the Sydney-to-Melbourne race were known to use the "Young Shuffle" to win the race. In 2010, comedian Hannah Gadsby named their Sydney Comedy Festival show "The Cliff Young Shuffle" in tribute.

== Cliffy (2013 film) ==
ABC1 broadcast Cliffy, a movie about Young's victorious 1983 run. The film starred Kevin Harrington as Young, with his race support team played by Roy Billing as his coach Wally, and Joshua Hine as Paul. Krew Boylan featured as Mary Howell. Young's mother and sister Eunice were played by former A Country Practice stars Joan Sydney and Anne Tenney.

=== Cast ===
- Kevin Harrington as Cliff Young
- Roy Billing as Wally
- Joshua Hine as Paul
- Krew Boylan as Mary Howell
- Joan Sydney as Mum
- Anne Tenney as Eunice
- Martin Sacks as Sid
- Denise Roberts as Molly
- Stephen Curry as Griffin
- Gyton Grantley as Powell
- Marty Fields as Ted
- Spencer McLaren as Race Official
- Peter Cousens as TV host

== Prisoner Cell Block H TV drama ==
Young also appeared briefly as himself in one episode (No. 479) of the television drama Prisoner: Cell Block H. He was there as a special guest to support the prisoners who were completing a dance marathon world record attempt as part of a storyline to raise money for a children's deaf charity.
