= Valmir Nunes =

Brazilian long-distance runner

Valmir Nunes (born January 16, 1964) is a Brazilian runner. A former world record holder, he currently holds South American and Brazilian Ultramarathon records.

== Career ==
Nunes initially found success in the 100-kilometre (62 mi) distance race, winning the world championship in 1991. He also placed first in the U.S.A. National 100 Kilometer Championship, finishing before the first American. In 1995 Nunes set the world record with a time of 6 hours, 18 minutes and 9 seconds in Winschoten, Netherlands. His record was not broken until 1998.

Nunes has also been successful in longer races. In 2001 he won the 246-kilometre (153 mi) Spartathlon in Greece in a time of 23 hours, 18 minutes and 5 seconds. He is a former record holder at the 135-mile (217 km) Badwater Ultramarathon. In 2007 he was the first runner to finish the race in less than 24 hours, setting a course record of 22 hours, 51 minutes and 29 seconds. During the race, temperatures reached 114 °F (46 °C). His record lasted 12 years, and was broken in 2019 by Japanese runner Yoshihiko Ishikawa, who stablished the new record in 21 hours, 33 minutes and 01 second.

In October 2010 Nunes attempted to break the world record for a 24-hour treadmill race. Although he won the race by running 215.60 kilometres (133.97 mi), he was unable to break the world record of 257.8 kilometres (160.2 mi).

=== Coaching ===
Nunes also coaches several runners, who compete in marathons and ultramarathons. In 1998 Nunes encouraged his maid, Sirlene Pinho, to begin running competitively. She has since won a bronze medal in the marathon at the 2007 Pan American Games.

In 2010 he released a book about his experiences in ultrarunning.
