= Mami Kudo =

Japanese ultramarathon runner

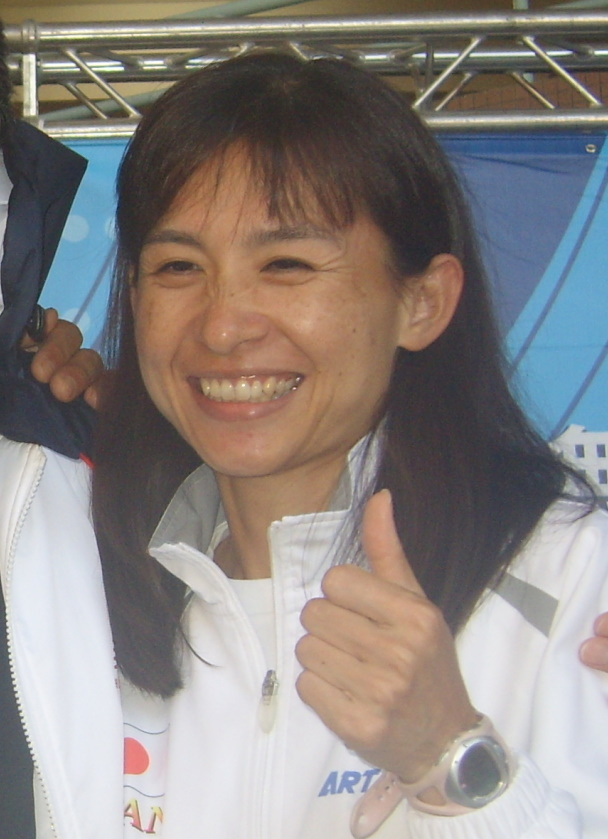
- Mami Kudo after winning the 2009 female SCUltraMarathon

Personal information
- Born: July 17, 1964 (age 61)

Sport
- Country: Japan
- Sport: ultramarathon
Medal record
Representing Japan
Ultramarathon
IAU 24 Hour World Championship
Gold medal – first place	2013 Steenbergen	24-hour run

Mami Kudo (工藤真実, Kudō Mami; born 17 July 1964) is a Japanese ultramarathon runner and women's winner of the 2013 IAU 24 Hour World Championship. Kudo holds the women's world record in the 24-hour run on the track and road, and also the 48-hour run road discipline.

In December 2011 Kudo reset her own 24-hour world record by running 255.303 km at the Soochow International 24 hour race in Taiwan. On 11–12 May 2013, Kudo won the IAU female 24-hour Road World Championship, setting a new world record of 24 hour Road (252,205 kilometres (156,713 miles)).

Kudo was selected as the Athlete of the Year by IAU for the years of 2012 and 2013.

== World records ==
- Women's 24 hour Track, 254.425 km (158.092 mi), Taipei, 12–13 Dec 2009
- Women's 48 hour Road, 368.687 km (229.091 mi), Athens, 8–10 Apr 2011

== International competitions ==
Year	Competition	Venue	Position	Event	Notes
Representing Japan
2013	World Championships	Steenbergen, Netherlands	1st	24-hour run Road	252,205 km (WR)
