= Stine Rex =

Danish ultramarathon runner

Sport
- Country: Danish
- Sport: Athletics
- Event: Ultramarathon
Medal record
Women's athletics
Representing Denmark
IAU 24 Hour European Championship
Silver medal – second place	2018 Timișoara	Individual

Stine Rex is a Danish ultrarunner. She won silver at the 2018 European 24-hour race in Timișoara, Romania, where she set a Danish record with 241.920 km. In 2019, she finished 5th at the World Championships in Albi, France, when she improved her own Danish record with 243.749 km.

In 2023, she set an unofficial world record in a 72-hour race covering over 500 kilometers.

== Personal bests ==
Event	Mark	Date	Venue	Notes
24 hours	245.8km	December 2023	Taipei, Taiwan	5th, IAU World Championship
48 hours	435.564km	May-June 2024	Hungary	Beyond women's world record; not ratified
6 days	928.577km	August-September 2025	Aabybro, Denmark	Guinness World Record
1,000km	6d 13h 35min	September 2025	Aabybro, Denmark	Women's best, by more than a day
10 days	1,301.591km	August 2026	Aabybro, Denmark	Women's world record
