= Jens Lukas =

German distance runner (born 1966)

Jens Lukas (born 13 April 1966) is a German long-distance runner.

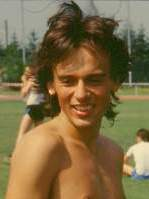
Jens Lukas 1991 - formerly running for the "Flatfeet Karlsruhe" / Germany.

== Achievements ==
- Won the Spartathlon 246 km - race from Athens to Sparta, Greece three times (1999), (2004), (2005) and finished second two times (2000), (2001)
- Won the International Sri Chinmoy 24h Run at Basel/Switzerland two times (1999), (2008)
- Won the International Association of Ultrarunners (IAU) 24h European Championship at Gravigny (2002) with 267 km 294 metres
- Finished third in the International Association of Ultrarunners (IAU) 24h World Championship at Wörschach (2005) with 256 km 368 metres
- Won the 153 km West Highland Way Race (2008) from Milngavie north of Glasgow to Fort William in the Scottish Highlands
- Finished second (2007) in the Ultra-Trail du Mont-Blanc and fourth (2006)

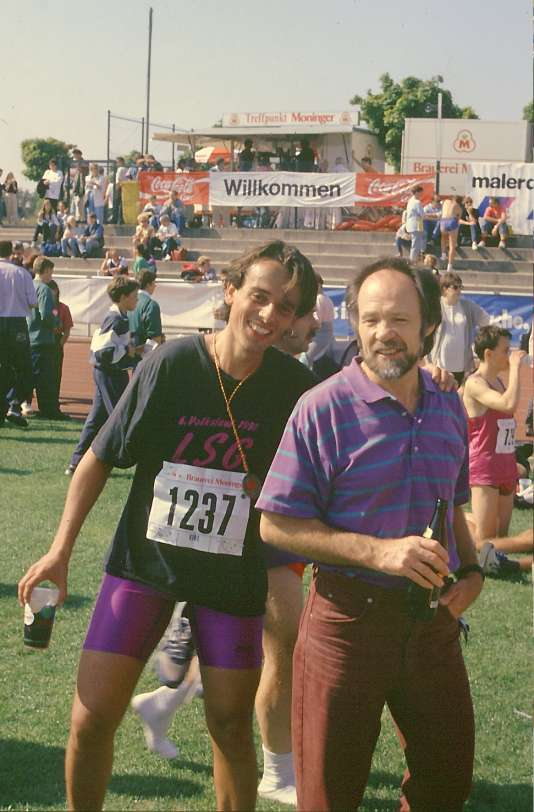
Jens Lukas - since 1993 LSG Karlsruhe / Germany .
