= Spartathlon =

Ultramarathon race from Athens to Sparti in Greece

Spartathlon is a 246-kilometre (153 mi) ultramarathon race held annually in Greece since 1983, between Athens and Sparta, the modern town on the site of ancient Sparta. The Spartathlon is based on the run of Pheidippides, an Athenian messenger who travelled from Athens to Sparta before the Battle of Marathon in a day and a half to seek aid against the Persians. Five Royal Air Force officers attempted the course in 1982 and the competition was started the next year.

Considered one of the most difficult ultramarathons because of its stringent cutoff times, hilly terrain, limited crew support opportunities and hot weather, the race has gained exceptional popularity, attracting runners from each continent. Entry spots are also highly coveted as organizers limit the field to 400, forcing most applicants into a lottery.

Spartathletes must run from Athens along the coast of the Megara Gulf, across the Isthmus of Corinth and over Mount Parthenion before descending into Sparta, passing through 75 check points.

== Origin ==
The Spartathlon aims to trace the footsteps of Pheidippides, an Athenian messenger sent to Sparta in 490 BC to seek help against the Persians in the Battle of Marathon. Pheidippides, according to an account by Greek historian Herodotus, arrived in Sparta the day after he departed. Herodotus wrote: "On the occasion of which we speak when Pheidippides was sent by the Athenian generals, and, according to his own account, saw Pan on his journey, he reached Sparta on the very next day after quitting the city of Athens."

Based on this account, John Foden, an officer of the Royal Air Force and a long distance runner, went to Greece in 1982 with four officers to test whether it was possible to cover the nearly 250 kilometres (155 miles) in a day and a half (36 hours). Three of them were successful in completing the distance: Foden himself in 37 hours and 37 minutes; John Scholtens in 34:30, and John McCarthy in 39:00. The following year a team of enthusiastic supporters (British, Greek and other nationalities) based at the British Hellenic Chamber of Commerce in Athens and led by Philhellene Michael Callaghan organised the running of the first Open International Spartathlon Race. The event was run under the auspices of SEGAS, the Hellenic Amateur Athletics Association. Forty-four men and one woman from twelve countries were entered into the first Spartathlon in 1983.

== Race ==
The Spartathlon is usually held around late September to roughly coincide with the date of the Battle of Marathon. Runners have 36 hours to run 246 kilometres (153 mi), roughly the equivalent of six consecutive marathons, between Athens and Sparti, the site of ancient Sparta. Runners have to deal with the Greek heat in the day, the cold of the night, and the mountainous terrain. There are 75 checkpoints along the way, where runners are disqualified for safety reasons if they fail to meet time cut-offs. Many runners have crews that support them during the race, such as helping them resupply at the checkpoints. Any non-finishers are picked up by a bus and taken to Sparta together.

The race begins at 7:00 am, roughly when dawn breaks, at the foot of the Acropolis of Athens, near the Odeon of Herodes Atticus and the Agora of Athens. The runners head westwards and the first major checkpoint is at 80 kilometres (50 mi), at the Corinth Canal on the Isthmus of Corinth that connects the Peloponnese to mainland Greece. Runners then proceed to the site of ancient Corinth.

Runners ascend the 1,200 metres (3,900 ft) high Sangas mountain pass on Mount Parthenion, and then descend towards Tegea, which is about 200 kilometres (120 mi) from the start of the race. According to Herodotus, Pheidippides had a vision of Pan at Tegea, in what may be the first recorded case of exercise-induced hallucination. The rest of the race is a 50 kilometres (31 mi) downhill segment to the town of Sparta.

The end of the race is a statue of Leonidas I, the Spartan king who died at the Battle of Thermopylae fighting the Persians ten years after Marathon, which is placed at the end of the main street in Sparta. Runners who finish the race receive a laurel wreath and water from schoolgirls dressed in chitons, and have access to medical tents. The national anthem of the winner is also played.

No monetary award is given to any of the finishers, but winning the race is considered prestigious and generates publicity that is helpful in attracting sponsors. Unlike Pheidippides, none of the runners have to make the return run back to Athens.

== Entry requirements ==
In order to run in this race an individual must have recently performed at least one of a number of qualifying feats, such as:

- Finishing a race of at least 100 km (62 mi) in less than 10 hours (male) or 10 hours 30 minutes (female).
- Competing in an event of more than 200 km (120 mi) and completing it in less than 29 hours (male) or 30 hours (female).
- Competing in Spartathlon within the two previous years and overcoming the mountain to reach the Nestani checkpoint at 172 km (107 mi) in less than 24 hours 30 minutes.

The criteria have been tightened at least once in the past and a ballot introduced, since the increasing prestige of the race and the gradual increase in the number of qualifying athletes mean that it is now always oversubscribed; however, elite athletes who can exceed the criteria by a large margin (25%, formerly 20%) are able to avoid the ballot and qualify automatically. Entries are now capped at 400 each year with non-automatic qualifiers chosen through a lottery system.

== Records ==
Tamás Bódis of Hungary holds the course record with a time of 19:40:51 set in 2026. Fotis Zisimopoulos and Yiannis Kouros hold the record for most wins among men, with four each while Sweden's Mary Larsson has the overall record with five wins. Camille Herron holds the women's course record with a time of 22 hours 35 minute and 31 seconds set in 2023. Herron was the first woman to run under 24 hours and placed third overall.

Hubert Karl of Germany holds the record for most finishes with 25. András Lőw of Hungary meanwhile holds the record for most consecutive finishes with 19.

In 2017, the 35th anniversary competition had a record 264 finishers under the 36-hour cut-off time. In 2018, the later stages of the race were substantially disrupted by the Medicane Zorbas, though almost all runners capable of finishing within the cut-off time were eventually able to do so.

Following are the winners of the Spartathlon:

=== Men ===
Year	1st	Nationality	Time	2nd	Nationality	Time	3rd	Nationality	Time
1983	Yiannis Kouros	Greece	21:53:42	Dušan Mravlje	Yugoslavia	24:40:38	Alan Fairbrother	United Kingdom	27:39:14
1984	Yiannis Kouros	Greece	20:25:00	Dušan Mravlje	Yugoslavia	23:44:00	Patrick Macke	United Kingdom	24:32:05
1985	Patrick Macke	United Kingdom	23:18:00	Dušan Mravlje	Yugoslavia	24:39:22	Jean Calbera	France	24:42:00
1986	Yiannis Kouros	Greece	21:57:00	Ernő Kis-Király	Hungary	26:07:00	Peter Mann	Germany	26:41:00
1987	Rune Larsson	Sweden	24:41:46	Patrick Macke	United Kingdom	26:41:51	James Zarei	United Kingdom	27:27:16
1988	Rune Larsson	Sweden	24:42:05	James Zarei	Iran	25:59:42	Georges Makris	Greece	26:47:00
1989	Patrick Macke	United Kingdom	24:32:05	Rune Larsson	Sweden	25:28:48	Seiichi Morikawa	Japan	26:08:18
1990	Yiannis Kouros	Greece	20:29:04	Patrick Macke	United Kingdom	23:08:41	János Bogár	Hungary	24:49:19
1991	János Bogár	Hungary	24:15:31	James Zarei	United Kingdom	26:48:50	George Stoakes	United Kingdom	30:50:35
1992	Rusko Kadiev	Bulgaria	24:08:13	Paul Beckers	Belgium	25:05:48	Roy Pirrung	United States	28:33:02
1993	Rune Larsson	Sweden	25:57:12	Marcel Foucat	France	27:46:37	Milan Furin	Slovakia	28:51:37
1994	James Zarei	United Kingdom	26:15:00	Kenji Okiyama	Japan	25:55:00	Peeter Kirppu	Estonia	26:07:00
1995	James Zarei	United Kingdom	25:59:42	Vasilios Chalkias	Greece	27:49:46	Kazuyoshi Ikeda	Japan	28:12:00
1996	Roland Vuillemenot	France	26:21:00	Dušan Mravlje	Slovenia	27:55:00	Roy Pirrung	United States	27:56:32
1997	Constantinos Reppos	Greece	23:37:00	Kenji Okiyama	Japan	25:55:00	Rune Larsson	Sweden	28:11:00
1998	Constantinos Reppos	Greece	25:11:41	Kenzi (Kenji) Okiyama	Japan	26:13:13	James Zarei	United Kingdom	26:44:04
1999	Jens Lukas	Germany	25:38:03	Jean Pierre Guyomarch	France	27:08:57	Jun Onoki	Japan	27:16:36
2000	Masayuki Ohtaki (Otaki, Ōtaki)	Japan	24:01:10	Jens Lukas	Germany	24:59:54	Cees Verhagen	Netherlands	25:35:50
2001	Valmir Nunes	Brazil	23:18:05	Jens Lukas	Germany	24:46:51	Ryōichi Sekiya	Japan	25:27:30
2002	Ryōichi Sekiya	Japan	23:47:54	Markus Thalmann	Austria	25:16:56	Jeffry Oonk	Netherlands	26:58:55
2003	Markus Thalmann	Austria	23:28:24	Valmir Nunes	Brazil	25:30:35	Jean-Jacques Moros	France	26:26:16
2004	Jens Lukas	Germany	25:49:59	Markus Thalmann	Austria	26:20:02	Martin Juri	Australia	27:19:15
2005	Jens Lukas	Germany	24:20:39	Jean-Jacques Moros	France	25:03:30	Markus Thalmann	Austria	26:34:42
2006	Scott Jurek	United States	22:52:18	Ryōichi Sekiya	Japan	24:14:11	Masayuki Ohtaki (Otaki, Ōtaki)	Japan	25:19:12
2007	Scott Jurek	United States	23:12:14	Piotr Kuryło	Poland	24:29:41	Valmir Nunes	Brazil	25:37:40
2008	Scott Jurek	United States	22:20:01	Markus Thalmann	Austria	24:52:09	Lars Skytte Christoffersen	Denmark	25:29:41
2009	Ryōichi Sekiya	Japan	23:48:24	Lars Skytte Christoffersen	Denmark	24:32:00	Jon Harald Berge	Norway	25:10:00
2010	Ivan Cudin	Italy	23:03:06	Jan Albert Lantink	Netherlands	23:31:00	Jan Prochaska	Germany	24:56:00
2011	Ivan Cudin	Italy	22:57:40	Yuji Sakai	Japan	24:22:24	Michael Vanicek	Germany	24:55:59
2012	Stu Thoms	Germany	26:28:19	Tetsuo Kiso	Japan	26:36:23	Markus Thalmann	Austria	27:14:25
2013	João Oliveira	Portugal	23:28:31	Florian Reus	Germany	25:29:11	Ivan Cudin	Italy	25:53:44
2014	Ivan Cudin	Italy	22:27:57	Florian Reus	Germany	23:56:19	Andrzej Radzikowski	Poland	25:48:25
2015	Florian Reus	Germany	23:16:44	Dan Lawson	United Kingdom	23:53:05	Hansen Kim	Denmark	23:53:52
2016	Andrzej Radzikowski	Poland	23:02:23	Marco Bonfiglio	Italy	23:36:58	Radek Brunner	Czech Republic	24:07:29
2017	Aleksandr Sorokin	Lithuania	22:04:04	Radek Brunner	Czech Republic	22:49:37	Nikolaos Sideridis	Greece	22:58:40
2018	Yoshihiko Ishikawa	Japan	22:55:13	Radek Brunner	Czech Republic	23:37:25	João Oliveira	Portugal	24:34:30
2019	Bódis Tamás	Hungary	23:29:24	Csécsei Zoltán	Hungary	24:16:59	Radek Brunner	Czech Republic	24:26:20
2021	Fotis Zisimopoulos	Greece	21:57:36	Radek Brunner	Czech Republic	23:17:49	Milan Sumny	Czech Republic	23:53:19
2022	Fotis Zisimopoulos	Greece	21:00:48	Toru Somiya	Japan	21:18:04	Yoshihiko Ishikawa	Japan	23:06:45
2023	Fotis Zisimopoulos	Greece	19:55:09 (Course Record)	Simen Holvik	Norway	22:17:23	Fernando Andres Martinez Roman	Uruguay	23:32:59
2024	Fotis Zisimopoulos	Greece	20:18:23	Martínez Roman Fernando Andres	Uruguay	23:28:46	Robin Florian	France	23:51:30
2025	Radek Brunner	Czech Republic	21:24:35	Perini Francesco	Italy	22:05:27	Ishikawa Yoshihiko	Japan	23:54:23
2026	Tamás Bódis	Hungary	19:40:51	Fotis Zisimopoulos	Greece	20:32:40	Ronkainen Tomi	Finland	21:26:36

=== Women ===
Time = hours:minutes:seconds

Year	1st	Nationality	Time	2nd	Nationality	Time	3rd	Nationality	Time
1983	Eleanor Robinson (formerly Adams)	United Kingdom	32:37:52	—	—	—	—	—	—
1984	Mary Hanudel (later Mary Larsson)	United States	30:27:00	Marcy Schwam; Lorna Richey (later Lorna Michael)	United States; United States	34:15:10	—	—	—
1985	Mary Hanudel (later Mary Larsson)	United States	34:10	—	—	—	—	—	—
1986	Mary Hanudel (later Mary Larsson)	United States	31:46:45	Waltraud Reisert	Germany	33:21:00	—	—	—
1987	Hilary Walker	United Kingdom	31:23:30	Waltraud Reisert	Germany	35:31:56	-	-	-
1988	—								
1989	Mary Hanudel (later Mary Larsson)	United States	31:57:23	Monika Kuno	Germany	34:10:00	Eiko Endo	Japan	34:36:49
1990	Anne-Marie Deguilhem	France	34:07:41	Pascale Mahé	France	35:08:03	Mary Hanudel-Larsson	United States	35:31:30
1991	Ursula Blasberg	Germany	34:42:45	—	—	—	—	—	—
1992	Hilary Walker	United Kingdom	31:23:30	Mary Hanudel-Larsson	United States	33:47:00	Miyako Yoshikoshi	Japan	33:47:52
1993	Sigrid Lomsky	Germany	32:46:17	Marie Bertrand	France	33:47:12	Miyako Yoshikoshi	Japan	34:18:00
1994	Helga Backhaus	Germany	30:39:00	Kazuko Kaihata	Japan	34:12:17	Miyako Yoshikoshi	Japan	34:33:21
1995	Helga Backhaus	Germany	29:33:00	Miyako Yoshikoshi	Japan	33:47:52	Kimie Funada (later Kimie Noto)	Japan	34:53:34
1996	Helga Backhaus	Germany	29:50:00	Mary Hanudel	United States	30:27:00	Kimie Funada (later Kimie Noto)	Japan	34:12:00
1997	Helga Backhaus	Germany	30:39:00	Kimie Funada (later Kimie Noto)	Japan	33:36:00	Heike Pawzik	Germany	33:46:00
1998	Mary Larsson	Sweden	28:46.58	Kimie Funada (later Kimie Noto)	Japan	29:32:21	Helga Backhaus	Germany	29:53:49
1999	Anny Monot	France	35:38:08	Kimie Funada (later Kimie Noto)	Japan	35:41:31	—	—	—
2000	Hiroko Okiyama	Japan	29:16:37	Mary Larsson	United States	30:56:16	Helga Backhaus	Germany	31:35:24
2001	Alzira Portela-Lario	Portugal	30:31:41	Kimie Funada (later Kimie Noto)	Japan	33:49:17	Heike Pawzik	Germany	34:41:10
2002	Irina Reutovich	Russia	28:10:48	Hiroko Okiyama	Japan	30:25:49	Mayumi Okabe	Japan	31:33:35
2003	Akiko Sakamoto	Japan	29:07:44	Sumie Inagaki	Japan	29:38:54	Barbara Szlachetka	Germany	31:50:23
2004	Kimie Noto	Japan	29:57:40	Hiroko Okiyama	Japan	31:01:17	Anke Drescher	Germany	32:55:26
2005	Kimie Noto	Japan	30:23:07	Elke Streicher	Germany	32:19:59	Anke Drescher	Germany	32:52:23
2006	Sumie Inagaki	Japan	28:37:20	Takako Furuyama	Japan	31:40:31	Mary Larsson-Hanudel	United States	31:41:56
2007	Akiko Sakamoto	Japan	31:09:24	Brigitte Bec	France	31:56:03	Kimie Noto	Japan	32:11:05
2008	Sook-Hue Hur	South Korea	30:03:22	Stacey Bunton	United States	31:25:59	Heinlein Marika	Germany	31:39:19
2009	Sumie Inagaki	Japan	27:39:49	Yoshiko Matsuda	Japan	31:16:00	Lisa Bliss	United States	32:27:00
2010	Emily Gelder	United Kingdom	30:17:03	Heather Fouwdlink-Hawker	United Kingdom	32:43:00	Yoshiko Matsuda	Japan	33:31:00
2011	Szilvia Lubics	Hungary	29:07:39	Ruth Podgornik Res	Slovenia	32:17:19	Mimi Anderson	United Kingdom	32:33:23
2012	Elizabeth Hawker (also 3rd overall that year)	United Kingdom	27:02:17	Leonie van den Haak	Netherlands	28:42:36	Szilvia Lubics	Hungary	29:45:56
2013	Szilvia Lubics	Hungary	28:03:04	Antje Krause	Germany	30:07:15	Heike Bergmann	Germany	30:22:03
2014	Szilvia Lubics	Hungary	26:53:40	Katalin Nagy	United States	28:55:03	Eva Esnaola	Spain	30:52:41
2015	Katalin Nagy	United States	25:06:05	Alyson Venti	United States	26:50:51	Szilvia Lubics	Hungary	29:18:44
2016	Katalin Nagy	United States	25:22:26	Smith Pam	United States	27:11:53	Zsuzsanna Maraz	Hungary	27:44:01
2017	Patrycja Bereznowska	Poland	24:48:18	Zsuzsanna Maraz	Hungary	25:43:40	Aleksandra Niwińska	Poland	26:28:48
2018	Zsuzsanna Maraz	Hungary	27:05:28	Kateřina Kašparová	Czech Republic	27:47:16	Teija Honkonen	Finland	28:36:08
2019	Zsuzsanna Maraz	Hungary	30:16:18	Irina Masanova	Russia	31:18:08	Natasa Robnik	Slovenia	32:15:31
2021	Diana Dzaviza	Latvia	25:24:25	Zsuzsanna Maraz	Hungary	26:00:14	Noora Honkala	Finland	26:27:14
2022	Diana Dzaviza	Latvia	25:03:07	Marisa Lizak	United States	25:34:00	Mica Morgan	United States	27:23:44
2023	Camille Herron	United States	22:35:31 (Course Record)	Noora Honkala	Finland	23:23:03	Satu Lipiainen	Finland	23:48:34
2024	Noora Honkala	Finland	24:25:08	Perez Serano Carmen Maria	Spain	25:34:13	Caliskaner Line	Norway	26:24:51
2025	Andrea Mórocza	Hungary	25:09:06	Simantrakou Despoina	Greece	25:37:44	Robnik Natasa	Slovenia	26:09:38
2026	Simantrakou Despoina	Greece	24:45:43	Churaňová Radka	Czech Republic	26:05:56	Panagiotou Lemonia	Greece	26:58:04

=== All-Time top 50 Women's performances ===
	Athlete	Time	Country	Year	Place	Age
1	Camille Herron	22:35:31	USA	2023	1	41
2	Noora Honkala	23:23:03	FIN	2023	2	31
3	Satu Lipiainen	23:48:34	FIN	2023	3	27
4	Noora Honkala	24:25:08	FIN	2024	1	32
5	Despoina Simantrakou	24:45:43	GRE	2026	1	34
6	Patrycja Bereznowska	24:48:18	POL	2017	1	41
7	Diana Dzaviza	25:03:41	LAT	2022	1	35
8	Katalin Nagy	25:07:12	USA	2015	1	36
9	Andrea Mórocza	25:09:06	HUN	2025	1	34
10	Katalin Nagy	25:23:52	USA	2016	1	37
11	Diana Dzaviza	25:24:25	LAT	2021	1	34
12	Perez Serano Carmen Maria	25:34:13	ESP	2024	2	42
13	Marisa Lizak	25:34:18	USA	2022	2	43
14	Despoina Simantrakou	25:37:44	GRE	2025	2	33
15	Zsuzsanna Maraz	25:43:40	HUN	2017	2	47
16	Zsuzsanna Maraz	26:00:14	HUN	2021	2	51
17	Radka Churaňová	26:05:56	CZE	2026	2	49
18	Robnik Natasa	26:09:38	SLO	2025	3	50
19	Caliskaner Line	26:24:51	NOR	2024	3	52
20	Noora Honkala	26:27:14	FIN	2021	3	29
21	Aleksandra Niwińska	26:28:48	POL	2017	3	31
22	Manta Georgia	26:42:42	GRE	2024	4	47
23	Alyson Venti	26:50:51	USA	2015	2	33
24	Szilvia Lubics	26:53:40	HUN	2014	1	40
25	Lemonia Panagiotou	26:58:04	GRE	2026	3	32
26	Stine Rex	26:58:16	DEN	2017	4	38
27	Lizzy Hawker	27:02:17	GBR	2012	1	36
28	Marisa Lizak	27:05:08	USA	2021	4	42
29	Zsuzsanna Maraz	27:05:28	HUN	2018	1	48
30	Pam Smith	27:13:31	USA	2016	2	42
31	Zsuzsanna Maraz	27:16:26	HUN	2019	1	49
32	Liouta Lamprini	27:18:43	GRE	2025	4	35
33	Veronika Jurisic	27:19:27	CRO	2017	5	40
34	Micah Morgan	27:24:01	USA	2022	3	39
35	Marisa Lizak	27:27:31	USA	2024	5	45
36	Sumie Inagaki	27:39:49	JPN	2009	1	43
37	Veronia Császár-Szabó	27:44:50	HUN	2026	4	40
38	Zsuzsanna Maraz	27:45:42	HUN	2016	3	46
39	Kateřina Kašparová	27:47:16	CZE	2018	2	32
40	Simantrakou Despoina	27:52:09	GRE	2024	6	32
41	Szvetlana Zétényi	27:57:49	HUN	2023	4	47
42	Szilvia Lubics	28:03:04	HUN	2013	1	39
42	Irina Reutovich	28:10:48	RUS	2002	1	52
43	Antje Krause	28:13:57	GER	2017	6	45
44	Irina Masanova	28:18:16	RUS	2019	2	35
45	Rex Stine	28:18:35	DEN	2023	5	44
46	Szvetlana Zétényi	28:26:25	HUN	2021	5	45
47	Irene Kinnegim	28:31:51	NED	2026	5	51
48	Teija Honkonen	28:36:08	FIN	2018	3	41
49	Georgia Manta	28:36:15	GRE	2018	4	41
50	Sumie Inagaki	28:37:20	JPN	2006	1	40

=== All-time top 50 Men's performances ===
	Athlete	Time	Country	Year	Place	Age
1	Tamás Bódis	19:40:51	HUN	2026	1	38
2	Fotis Zisimopoulos	19:55:09	GRE	2023	1	41
3	Fotis Zisimopoulos	20:18:43	GRE	2024	1	42
4	Yiannis Kouros	20:25:00	GRE	1984	1	28
5	Yiannis Kouros	20:29:04	GRE	1990	1	34
6	Fotis Zisimopoulos	20:32:41	GRE	2026	2	44
7	Fotis Zisimopoulos	21:00:48	GRE	2022	1	39
8	Toru Somiya	21:18:04	JPN	2022	2	42
9	Radek Brunner	21:24:35	CZE	2025	1	50
10	Tomi Ronkainen	21:26:36	FIN	2026	3	41
11	Yiannis Kouros	21:53:42	GRE	1983	1	27
12	Yiannis Kouros	21:57:00	GRE	1986	1	30
13	Fotis Zisimopoulos	21:57:36	GRE	2021	1	38
14	Tielemans Jelle	22:03:31	BEL	2026	4	38
15	Aleksandr Sorokin	22:04:04	LTU	2017	1	36
16	Perini Francesco	22:05:27	ITA	2025	2	39
17	Simen Holvik	22:17:23	NOR	2023	2	46
18	Scott Jurek	22:20:01	USA	2008	1	34
19	Georgios Logothetis	22:24:41	GRE	2026	5	33
20	Ivan Cudin	22:29:29	ITA	2014	1	39
21	Radek Brunner	22:49:37	CZE	2017	2	42
22	Scott Jurek	22:52:18	USA	2006	1	32
23	Yoshihiko Ishikawa	22:55:13	JPN	2018	1	30
24	Ivan Cudin	22:57:40	ITA	2011	1	36
25	Nikolaos Sideridis	22:58:40	GRE	2017	3	36
26	Andrzej Radzikowski	23:02:23	POL	2016	1	35
27	Ivan Cudin	23:03:06	ITA	2010	1	35
28	Yoshihiko Ishikawa	23:06:45	JPN	2022	3	34
29	Patrick Macke	23:08:41	GBR	1990	2	35
30	Martínez Morales Francisco Mariano	23:11:18	ESP	2026	6	47
31	Scott Jurek	23:12:14	USA	2007	1	33
32	Florian Reus	23:17:31	GER	2015	1	31
33	Radek Brunner	23:17:49	CZE	2021	2	48
34	Alexandros Karykas	23:17:55	GRE	2026	7	34
35	Patrick Macke	23:18:00	GBR	1985	1	30
36	Valmir Nunes	23:18:05	BRA	2001	1	37
37	Yoshihiko Ishikawa	23:20:56	JPN	2017	4	29
38	Tibor Eros	23:23:53	HUN	2022	4	46
39	Markus Thalmann	23:28:24	AUT	2003	1	39
40	Martínez Roman Fernando Andres	23:28:46	URU	2024	2	49
41	Joao Oliveira	23:29:08	POR	2013	1	36
42	Tamás Bódis	23:29:24	HUN	2019	1	31
43	Jan Lantink-Albert	23:31:22	HOL	2010	2	52
44	Fernando Andres Martinez Roman	23:32:59	URU	2023	3	48
45	Váradi Bence	23:35:42	HUN	2026	8	32
46	Marco Bonfiglio	23:36:58	ITA	2016	2	39
47	Kostas Reppos	23:37:00	GRE	1997	1	31
48	Jort van Zutphen	23:37:15	NED	2026	9	42
49	Radek Brunner	23:37:25	CZE	2018	2	44
50	Valdenir Jandosa	23:37:33	BRA	2023	4	44
