= Yiannis Kouros =

Greek ultramarathon runner (born 1956)

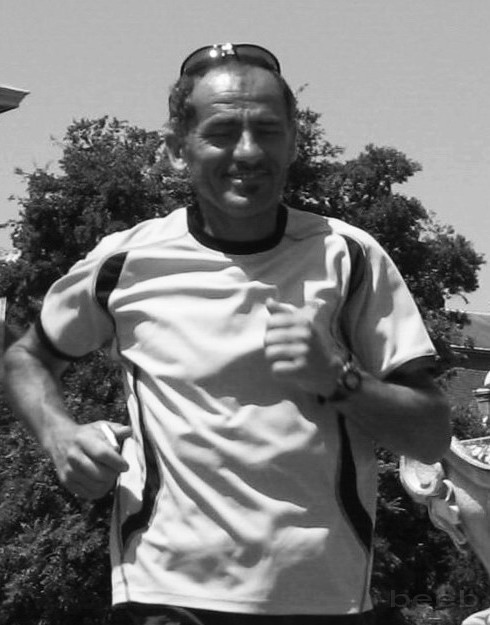
- Yiannis Kouros in 2008

Personal information
- Born: 13 February 1956 (age 70) Tripoli, Kingdom of Greece
- Website: https://www.yianniskouros.com

Sport
- Sport: Track and Field
- Events: 24-hour run, 48-hour run, 6-day race

Achievements and titles
- Personal bests: Marathon: 2:24:00; Spartathlon: 20:25:00
Medal record
Men's Ultramarathon (partial list)
| Gold medal – first place | Adelaide 24-hour run | 1997 |
| Gold medal – first place | Basel 24-hour run | 1998 |
| Gold medal – first place | IAU 24 Hour World Championship | 2001 |
| Gold medal – first place | Soochow University 24-hour run | 2002 |
| Gold medal – first place | 24-hour run San Giovanni Lupatoto | 1999 |
| Gold medal – first place | 24-hour run San Giovanni Lupatoto | 2000 |
| Gold medal – first place | Surgères 48 Hour Race | 1995 |
| Gold medal – first place | Surgères 48 Hour Race | 1996 |
| Gold medal – first place | Surgères 48 Hour Race | 1997 |
| Gold medal – first place | Surgères 48 Hour Race | 2000 |
| Gold medal – first place | Surgères 48 Hour Race | 2002 |
| Gold medal – first place | Surgères 48 Hour Race | 2003 |
| Gold medal – first place | Surgères 48 Hour Race | 2004 |
| Gold medal – first place | Australian Six Day Race – Colac | 1984 |
| Gold medal – first place | Australian Six Day Race – Colac | 2000 |
| Gold medal – first place | Cliff Young Australian 6-day race | 2005 |
| Gold medal – first place | Sydney to Melbourne Ultramarathon | 1985 |
| Gold medal – first place | Sydney to Melbourne Ultramarathon | 1987 |
| Gold medal – first place | Sydney to Melbourne Ultramarathon | 1989 |
| Gold medal – first place | Sydney to Melbourne Ultramarathon | 1990 |
| Gold medal – first place | Athens to Sparta Run | 1983 |
| Gold medal – first place | Athens to Sparta Run | 1984 |
| Gold medal – first place | Athens to Sparta Run | 1986 |
| Gold medal – first place | Athens to Sparta Run | 1990 |

Yiannis Kouros (Greek: Γιάννης Κούρος, pronounced [ʝiˈa.nis ˈku.ros]; born 13 February 1956 in Tripoli, Kingdom of Greece) is a Greek ultramarathon runner based in Greece. Kouros holds or formerly held many world records between 100 miles and 1,000 miles. In 1991, he starred as Pheidippides in the movie The Story Of The Marathon: A Hero's Journey, which chronicles the history of marathon running.

Kouros came to prominence when he won the Spartathlon in 1984 in a record time of 20 hours and 25 minutes. He also won the Sydney to Melbourne Ultramarathon in 1985 in a record time of 5 days, 5 hours, 7 minutes, and 6 seconds, beating the previous record held by Cliff Young. Kouros held Australian citizenship for part of his running career and was inducted into the Australian Ultra Runners Association's Hall of Fame in 2019.

In 1990, following a dispute with his employer in Greece, Kouros emigrated to Australia. He became an Australian citizen in 1994. Twenty years later, in 2014, at the age of 58, Kouros retired from ultrarunning competition.

Concerning the secret of his success, Kouros claims: "When other people get tired, they stop. I don't. I take over my body with my mind. I tell it that it's not tired, and it listens."

Kouros has also written over 1,000 poems, several of which appear in his books, Symblegmata ("Clusters") and The Six-Day Run of the Century.

The first road race event, Yiannis Kouros Tripolis Run, took place on 19 and 20 September 2026 in Tripoli, in honor of Yiannis Kouros.

== World records ==
Kouros has held or currently holds the following world records:

=== Distance ===
| 100 miles [Former world record] | Road | 11h 46min 37s | 13.665 km/h (8.491 mph) |
| 1,000 km | Track | 5d 16h 17min 00s | 7.338 km/h (4.560 mph) |
| 1,000 km | Road | 5d 20h 13min 40s | 7.131 km/h (4.431 mph) |
| 1,000 miles | Road | 10d 10h 30min 36s | 6.424 km/h (3.992 mph) |

=== Time races ===
| 12 h [Former world record, current 45–49 age record] | Road | 162.543 km (101.000 mi) | 13.545 km/h (8.416 mph) |
| 24 h [Former world record] | Road | 290.221 km (180.335 mi) | 12.093 km/h (7.514 mph) |
| 24 h [Former world record] | Track | 303.506 km (188.590 mi) | 12.646 km/h (7.858 mph) |
| 48 h [Former world record, current 40–44 age record] | Road | 433.095 km (269.113 mi) | 9.023 km/h (5.607 mph) |
| 48 h [Former world record] | Track | 473.495 km (294.216 mi) | 9.875 km/h (6.136 mph) |
| 6 days [Former world record] | Road | 1,028.370 km (638.999 mi) | 7.142 km/h (4.438 mph) |
| 6 days [Former world record, current 45–49 age record] | Track | 1,038.851 km (645.512 mi) | 7.214 km/h (4.483 mph) |

== See also ==
- Multiday races
