= Traci Falbo =

Indoor ultramarathon world record holder

Traci Falbo holds the world record for the 48-hour indoor ultramarathon. On August 6, 2014, she completed the 2-day event in Anchorage, Alaska, with a distance of 389.61 km.
