= Jayanti =

Jayanti or Jayanthi, a feminine Sanskrit word meaning "victorious", may refer to:

- Jayanti (Hinduism), a figure in Hindu Religion, a daughter of Indra
- Jayanti (film), a 2021 Indian Marathi-language film

== Places ==
- Jayanti, Alipurduar, a village in Buxa Tiger Reserve, Alipurduar district, West Bengal, India
- Jayanti Devi Temple, Haryana, India
- Jayanti Stadium, Bhilai, India
- Jayanti, Indonesia, a subdistrict of Tangerang Regency, Banten, Indonesia

== People ==
=== Given name ===
- Jayanthi (actress) (1945–2021), South Indian actress
- Princess Jayanti of Nepal (1946–2001), member of the Nepalese royal family
- Jayanthi Ballal (born 1972), Indian fashion entrepreneur and designer
- Jayanti Behera (born 1999), Indian track and field Paralympic athlete
- Jayanti Dalal (1909–1970), Indian author, publisher, film maker and politician
- Jayanthi Kumaresh (active from 1990), Indian veena musician
- Jayanthi Kuru-Utumpala (born 1979), first Sri Lankan to summit Mount Everest
- Jayanthi Kyle (born c. 1979), American gospel and soul singer
- Jayanti Lutchmedial, Trinidad and Tobago politician
- Jayanti Naik (born 1962), Indian writer and folklorist
- Jayanthi Natarajan (born 1954), Indian lawyer and politician
- Jayanti Patel (1924–2019), Indian actor, playwright and yogi
- Jayanti Patnaik (1932–2022), Indian politician
- Jayanthi Rajan Indian politician, Dalit politician and Social worker
- Jayanti Devi Rai (fl. 2020s), deputy chairperson of the Communist Party of Nepal (Unified Socialist)
- Jayanti Tamm, author of the 2009 memoir Cartwheels in a Sari

=== Surname ===
- Aruna Jayanthi (born before 1984), Indian businesswoman
- Dandeniya Gamage Jayanthi (active from 1989), Sri Lankan political activist
- Kimmy Jayanti (born 1991), Indonesian model and actress
- Vikram Jayanti (born 1955), American documentary filmmaker

== See also ==
- Jayant (disambiguation), masculine version of the word
