= Spanier =

Spanier means "man from Spain" in German and, as a surname, may refer to:

- Edwin Henry Spanier (1921–1996), American mathematician known for the Alexander-Spanier cohomology theory
- Graham Spanier (born 1948), former president of Penn State University
- Muggsy Spanier (1906–1967), American jazz musician
- Sam Spanier (1925–2008), American artist
- Wolfgang Spanier (1943–2018), German politician, member of the Bundestag
- Nicolina Dijjers Spanier (born 1909), real name of screen actress Lien Deyers
- Ian Spanier (born 1974), American Photographer
