= Impossibility Challenger =

- Logo

Impossibility Challenger is an event in which amateurs and professionals meet, and try to excel, with records and world records set up. The event takes place in different locations each year, mostly in Europe, and is organized by the Sri Chinmoy Centers.

== History ==
The event was created in 1982 by Sri Chinmoy. The first events were held in Zurich, Switzerland from 1982 to 1991. From 2002 to 2010 it took place close to Munich, later two times in New Zealand and one time in Hungary. In 2014, it was in Leiria, Portugal and in November 2015 and 2016 it was held in Berlin, Germany, 2017 in the Czech Republic, 2018 in Leiria, Portugal and the next holding is planned in the Netherlands in November 2019. In 2020, the event was canceled due to the COVID-19 pandemic.

== Extract of world records ==
- 2002 Agim Agushi (Kosovo) is heading a football continuously for 15 km in 3:12:29 hours
- 2005 Shamita Achenbach-König sets a world record by playing Cello for 24 hours (she played over 4,000 pieces)
- 2006 Vaibhava Jewgenij Kuschnow (Austria) sets a world record by holding a headstand on a driving car for 21:20 min
- 2006 Milan Roskopf (Slovakia) juggles three 10 kg shots for 15.8 seconds
- 2008 Ashrita Furman (US) sets a world record by run the fastest mile on stilts in 7:13 min
- 2008 Rainer Schröder (Germany) pulled a small truck of 7t for 28.15 meters in 1 minute with his teeth
- 2008 Ralf Laue (Germany) blew a regular golf ball over a distance of 3.284 meters with one breath
- 2009 Ramón Campayo (Spain) correctly memorized a 34-digit binary number in only 0.5 seconds
- 2010 Ranjit Pal (India) 255 rope skips in one minute
- 2010 Anavi Jenniver Davies (Canada) sets a world record by whistling 24 hours
- 2014 Charuhasi Eckhard Schröder (Germany) recited 3148 poems by heart in a period of 34 hours
- 2014 Albert Walter tore a Phonebook with 1551 pages in 9.38 seconds
- 2015 Belachew Girma (Ethiopia) set a world record laughing non-stop for 3 hours, 35 min and 30 seconds
- 2015 Samalya Arthur Schäfer (Germany) runs the fastest mile in swim fins in 5 minutes, 33 seconds
- 2015 Karteek Clark (Scotland) told the most jokes in an hour: 587
- 2016 Abhinabha Tangermann (Netherlands) did the most one-hand-claps with one hand in a minute: 427
- 2016 Radek Rosa (Czech Republic) pulled a tractor with a weight of 10'075.8 tons for 20 meters in 2.025 minutes
