= Peace Run =

Global relay

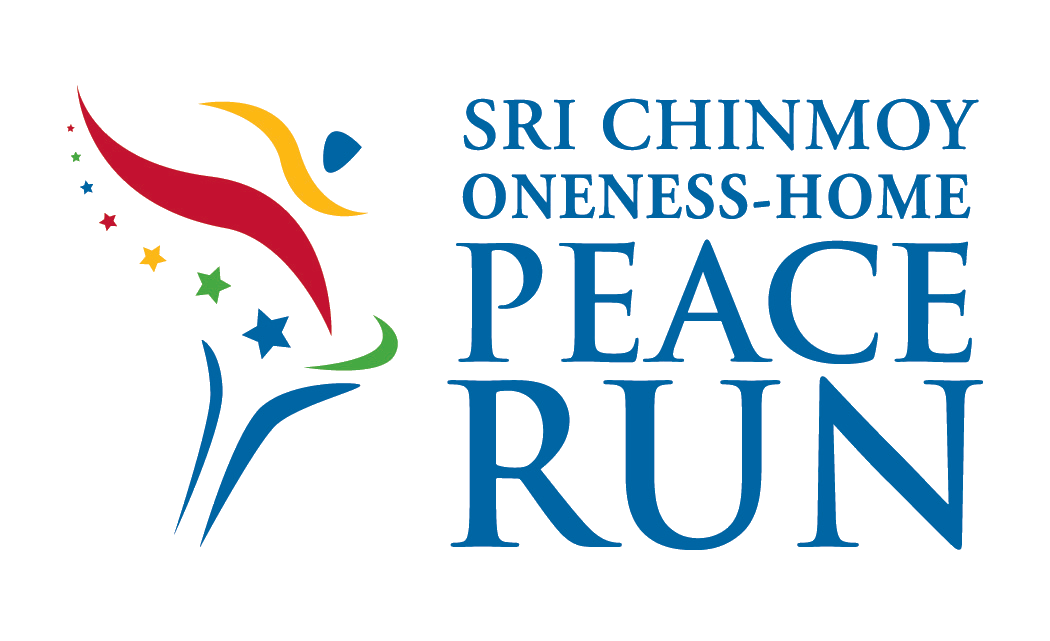
- Logo
- Date: Annually
- Location: Worldwide
- Established: 1987
- Website: Peace Run

The Peace Run is a global relay which promotes international friendship and understanding, founded by Sri Chinmoy.

== History ==
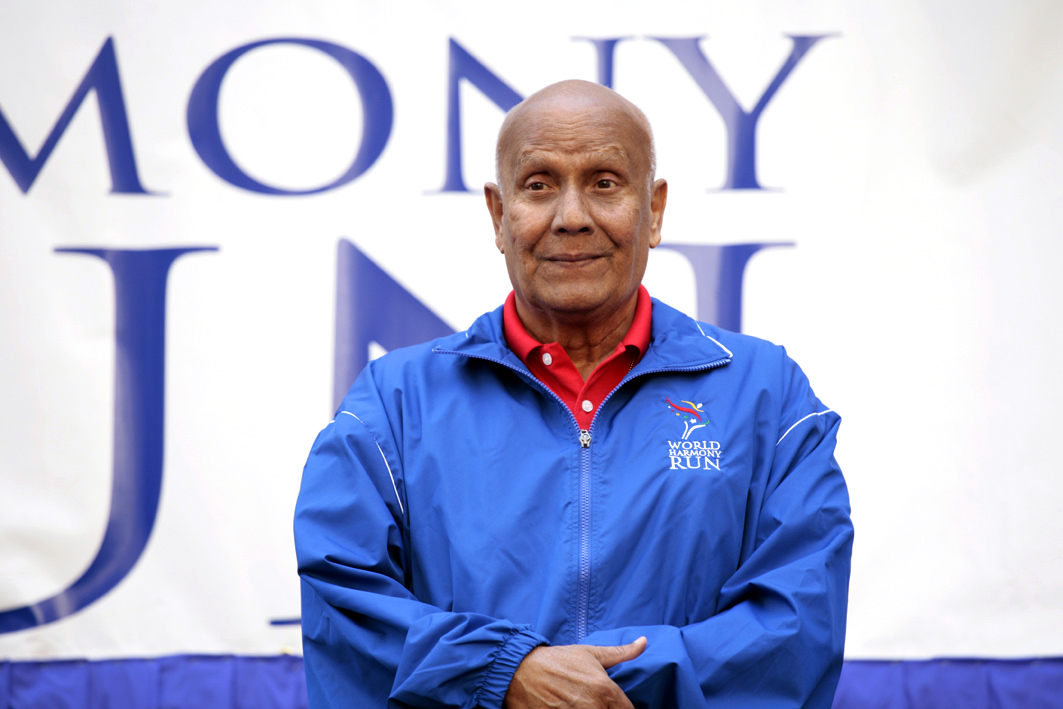
Sri Chinmoy at WHR

In 1987, Sri Chinmoy, founded a run for international friendship, the Peace Run. The Liberty Torch Run, a relay to mark America's bicentennial in 1976, was the forerunner to this race. The Peace Run was initially held every two years and then annually. From 2005 to 2013 it was known under the name World Harmony Run. In June 2013 it returned to its previous name Peace Run. The team of international runners carry a torch as a symbol of friendship. The Peace Run has taken place in more than 100 countries. The aim of the torch run is to promote understanding and the harmonious relationship between the peoples of all nations, faiths and cultures. The Peace Run is a grassroots event and the international team meet with dignitaries, mayors, community groups and schools inviting them to participate by holding the peace torch and by making a step towards a more harmonious world. Past participants include Mother Teresa, Nelson Mandela and Mikhail Gorbachev who supported the run and held the peace torch. Nine time Olympic Carl Lewis is a spokesman for the Peace Run.

== Song ==
An official theme song "Oneness-Home" was composed by Narada Michael Walden and recorded by Whitney Houston.

== Routes ==
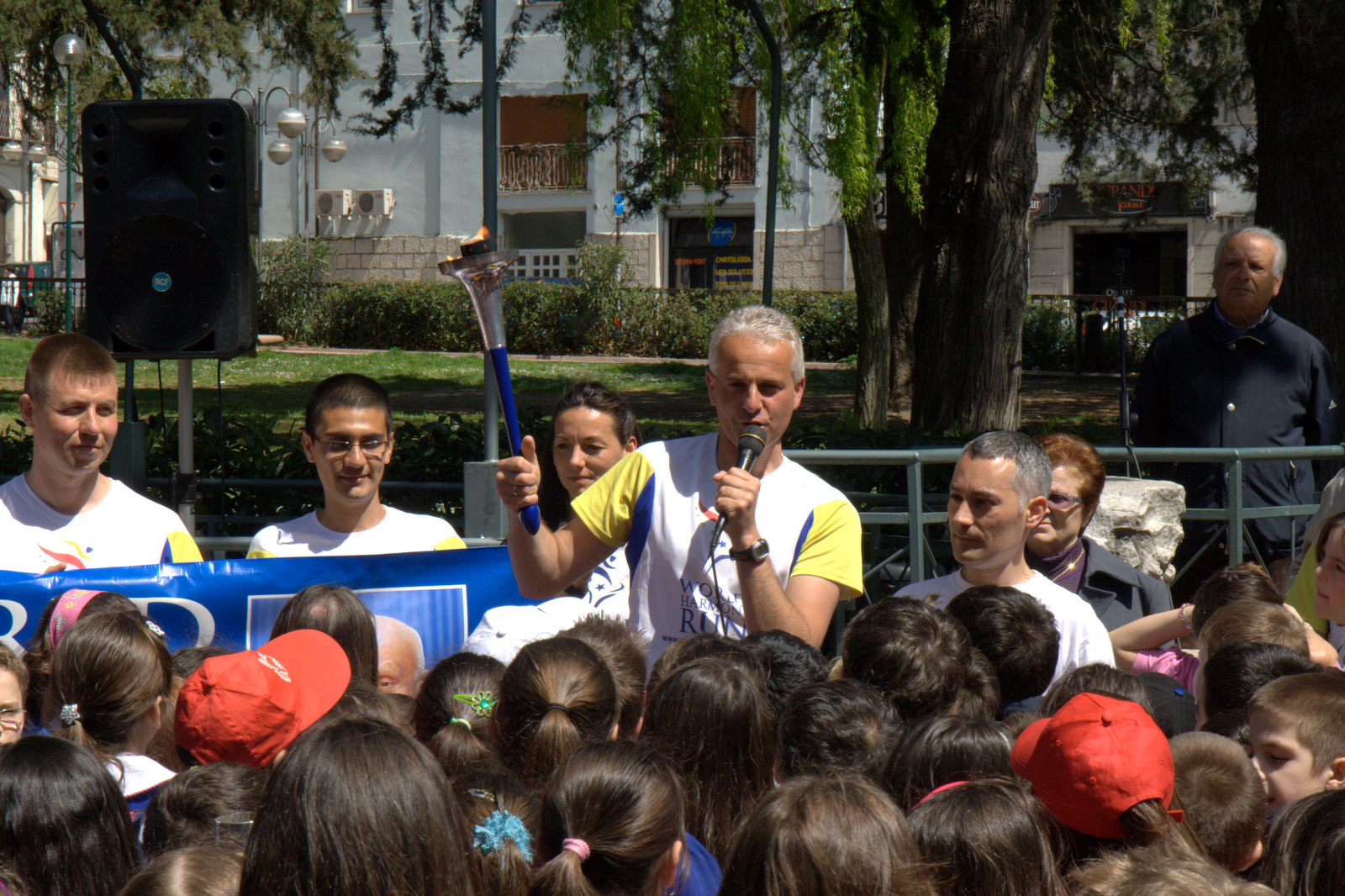
Isernia, Italy (2010)

Some examples of routes or its parts:

- 2006 Uganda: Kampala - Jinja, Uganda
- 2007 Bulgaria, : Sofia - Montana, Bulgaria
- 2008 Indonesia, : Jakarta
- 2008 United States, : Mancos - Bluff, Utah and Pagosa Springs, Colorado - Hesperus, Colorado
- 2008 Poland, : Szczecin - Stargard Szczeciński - Koszalin - Słupsk - Kościerzyna - Wejherowo - Gdańsk
