= Jayanth =

Jayanth is an Indian masculine given name and may refer to:

- Jayanth C. Paranjee, Tollywood film director
- Chinni Jayanth, Tamil actor
- Meg Jayanth, video game creator

== See also ==
- Jayant (disambiguation)
