= Ashrita Furman =

American Guinness World Records record-breaker

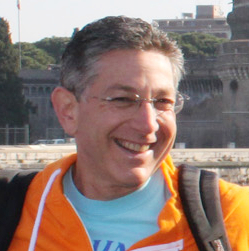
- Furman in Rome, Italy 2011
- Born: Keith Furman; September 16, 1954 (age 72); Brooklyn, New York, U.S.
- Occupation: Health food store manager
- Years active: 1979–present

Ashrita Furman (born Keith Furman, September 16, 1954) is an American Guinness World Records record-breaker. As of 2023, Furman has set more than 700 official Guinness Records and currently holds over 200 records, thus holding the Guinness world record for the most Guinness world records. He has been breaking records since 1979.

== Life and records ==
=== Early life ===
Furman, who is of Jewish heritage, was born in 1954 in Brooklyn, New York. He was fascinated with the Guinness Book of World Records as a child but never thought he could ever break a record since he was very unathletic.

As a teenager, he became interested in spirituality and in 1970 became a devout follower of the spiritual leader Sri Chinmoy.

Sri Chinmoy inspired Furman to participate in a 24-hour bicycle race in New York City's Central Park in 1978. With only two weeks' training, Furman tied for third place, cycling 405 miles (652 km). Around this time, he changed his first name to Ashrita ('protected by God' in Sanskrit).

=== First record ===
In 1979, Furman set his first official record by doing 27,000 jumping jacks. In 1986, Furman invented and set the record for underwater pogo stick jumping and introduced it on Good Morning America on April Fools' Day.

=== Records around the world ===
Furman has managed a health food store in Jamaica, Queens, New York, since 1982. He is also a tour manager for his meditation group and is therefore able to travel extensively. As of 2014, Furman has set records in 40 countries. He completed his goal of breaking a record on all seven continents when he set the mile hula hoop record at Uluru (also known as Ayers Rock) in the Australian desert in 2003. Furman has also set records at famous landmarks such as Egyptian pyramids (distance pool cue balancing), Stonehenge (standing on a Swiss ball), the Eiffel Tower (most sit-ups in an hour), the Great Wall of China (hopping on a kangaroo ball), Borobudur (fastest time running a mile while balancing a milk jug on your head) and Angkor Wat (jumping rope on a pogo stick). While in China, Furman broke the record for running 8 km (4.97 mi) on stilts in the fastest time (39 min 56 sec), a record which had stood since 1982.

=== Creating new records ===
Furman has also been a pioneer in setting records in several new activities including landrowing. Using a converted indoor rower with wheels and brakes, Furman rowed 1,500 miles (2,400 km) in 16 days in Bali in 1991. Furman also developed the sport of gluggling, underwater juggling, which he did for 48 minutes at Kelly Tarlton's Antarctic Encounter and Underwater World in Auckland, New Zealand, in 2002, and distance sack racing, which Furman did for a mile while racing against a yak in Mongolia in 2007. On January 30, 2008, Furman unveiled his giant pencil – 76 feet (23 m) long, 22,000 pounds (with 4,000 solid pounds of Pennsylvania graphite). The pencil was built in three weeks as a birthday gift for teacher Sri Chinmoy on 27 August 2007. Longer than the 65-foot (20 m) pencil outside the Malaysia HQ of stationers Faber-Castell, it was transported from Queens, New York, to the City Museum in St. Louis. In April 2009 Furman became the first person to hold 100 Guinness world records at once.

== See also ==
- Impossibility Challenger
