= Cartwheels in a Sari =

2009 book by Jayanti Tamm

Cartwheels in a Sari: A Memoir of Growing Up Cult
- Author: Jayanti Tamm
- Genre: Religion & Spirituality
- Publisher: Harmony Books
- Publication date: April 14, 2009
- Publication place: United States
- Media type: Hardcover
- Pages: 304
- ISBN: 0-307-39392-5

Cartwheels in a Sari: A Memoir of Growing Up Cult is a memoir written by Jayanti Tamm, published in 2009, describing her life as a disciple of Indian-American spiritual leader Sri Chinmoy.

Tamm, who was born into Chinmoy's organization, claims in the book that Chinmoy predicted she would become his perfect disciple. She was banished from the group when she was 25. Cartwheels in a Sari describes her life in the guru's inner circle and her efforts to break free from his influence.

According to the book, Chinmoy banned sex, and most disciples were directed to remain single. The book also states that the guru disparaged secular education, and his prohibitions included the consumption of alcohol, caffeine, and meat; dancing; dating; socializing with outsiders; and owning pets, although he kept a collection of exotic pets in his Queens basement.

In her introduction to the book, Tamm notes that the 7,000 other Chinmoy followers around the world, and others who encountered Chinmoy, are likely to have had different experiences and perceptions.

An audio version of the book was released on April 1, 2010.

== Gallery ==
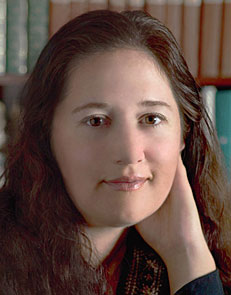
Jayanti Tamm

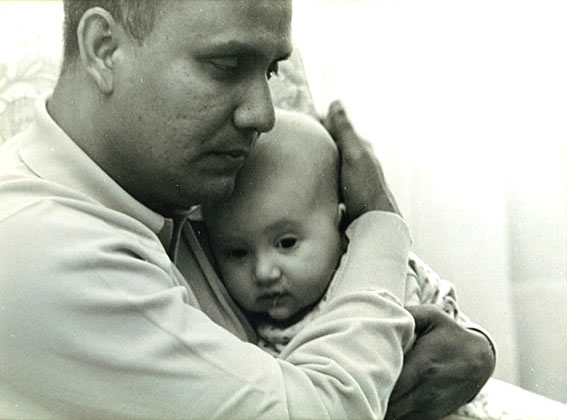
Sri Chinmoy holding Jayanti Tamm in his arms in 1970, when she was four months old. Tamm left the group decades later.
