= Jayant (disambiguation) =

Jayant may also refer to:

- Jayanta, also spelled as Jayant, the son of Indra, the king of gods in Hinduism
- Jayanta Bhatta, 9th-century Indian logician and author
- Jayanta Bose, a Hindustani classical musician
- Jayant (actor), Bollywood actor
- Jayant Salgaonkar, Indian businessman, historian, scholar, and writer
- Jayant Narlikar, Indian astrophysicist
- Jayant Kaikini or Jayanta Kāykiṇi, poet
- Jayant Patel, Indian-American former surgeon and convicted fraudster
- Jayant Patil, Indian politician from the state of Maharashtra
- Jayant Chaudhary, Indian politician
- Jayant Kripalani, Indian actor, director, and trainer
- Jayant Prasad, Indian diplomat
- B. Jayant Baliga, Indian electrical engineer
- Jayant Parmer, Indian Urdu language poet
- Jayant Gadit, Gujarati novelist and literary critic
- Jayant Haritsa, a faculty of SERC and CSA departments at Indian Institute of Science, Bangalore
- Jayant Pandurang Naik (often called J. P. Naik), Indian educator
- Jayant Ganpat Nadkarni (1931–2018), Indian Navy admiral
- Jayant Shridhar Tilak, politician
- Jayanta Mahapatra, Indian English poet
- Jayanth C. Paranjee, Tollywood film director
- Jayant Sinha, Indian politician

== See also ==
- Jayanth (disambiguation)
