= Jayanti Patel =

Indian actor, playwright, and yogi (1925–2019)

Jayanti Kalidas Patel (24 May 1924 – 26 May 2019) was an Indian actor, playwright and yogi.

== Early life and education ==
Patel was born 24 May 1924 in Ahmedabad, India. He completed a BA at the University of Mumbai in 1947, and completed a PhD at the Bharatiya Vidya Bhavan at the Mungalal Goenka Institute in Mumbai for his work in Natya Yoga.

== Quit India Movement ==
As a young man, Patel joined Mahatma Gandhi and the Quit India Movement in protest of the British rule of India. Patel was shot in the leg during a march resulting in an injury that produced a lifelong indentation and limp.

== All India Radio and "Ranglo" ==
In the 1940s and 1950s, Patel portrayed the comic character "Ranglo" on All-India Radio and in subsequent stage and television productions. He took this name also for his cartooning persona, and continued to explore this character throughout his life.

== Travels and work in the West ==
In 1967, Patel was awarded a John F. Kennedy Scholarship and traveled to the US to continue his work in Natya Yoga. While there, he began a long association with the Ananda Ashrama in Monroe, New York and in San Francisco.

=== "Inner Broadway" ===
Traveling throughout the U.S., France, England and Germany, Patel continued to develop his work in theater as a form of yoga.

"He feels that both natya and yoga have a common purpose – to shatter the ego, to experience bliss and thereby universalize the individual person and transcending the limitations of time and space. Natya like any other form of an art is Yoga in Indian thought. It is a transpersonal art according to Jayanti. Instead of Ego, it takes you beyond Ego."

His works included those exploring the modern experiences of time, technology, and alienation, as well as the tools to transcend these challenges and find inner peace.

=== "Transplanation, not Translation" ===
Patel adapted several Western plays and novels for Indian audiences—including a "transplantation" of George Washington Slept Here into "Gandhi Slept Here", a Gujuarati-language Of Mice and Men, Death of a Salesman (especially poignant as India modernized and new ways of doing business emerged), and Harvey.

== "Chaplin, Gandhi and Me" ==
In 2015, at age 91, Patel published the book Chaplin, Gandhi and Me2, exploring the correlation between the teachings of Mahatma Gandhi and Charlie Chaplin.

== Personal life and death ==
In 1944, Patel married Smt. Sharda, and together they had three children: Nivedita, Warsha, and Nilesh. Patel latterly resided in Pune with his daughter Warsha and son Nilesh. He died in Ahmedabad on 26 May 2019, two days after his 95th birthday.
