= Sri Chinmoy =

Indian writer and spiritual teacher (1931–2007)

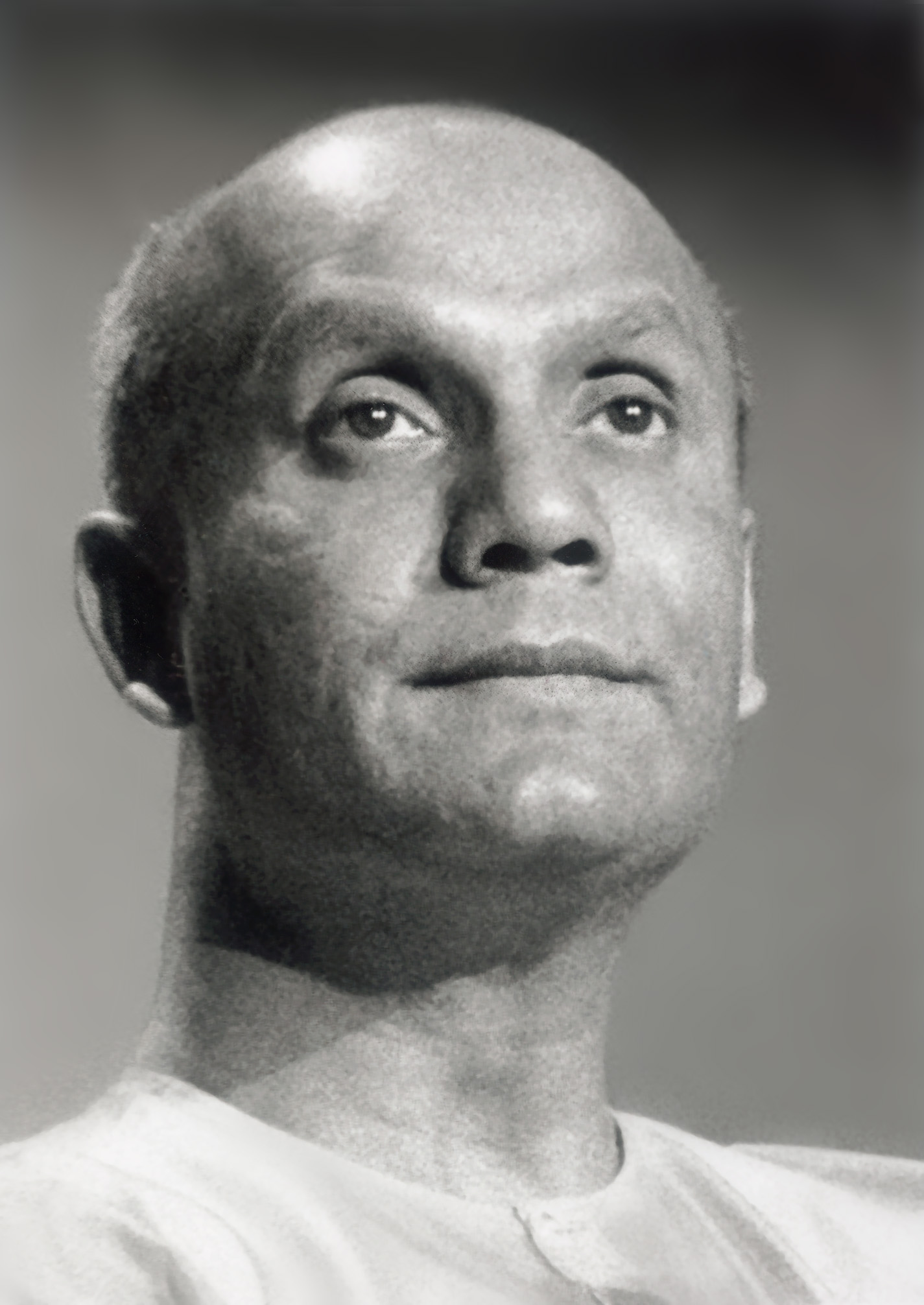
- Born: Chinmoy Kumar Ghose; 27 August 1931; Boalkhali, Chittagong District, Bengal Presidency, British India (now in Bangladesh)
- Died: 11 October 2007 (aged 76); New York City, U.S.
- Occupation: Spiritual teacher

Chinmoy Kumar Ghose (27 August 1931 – 11 October 2007), better known as Sri Chinmoy, was an Indian spiritual leader who taught meditation in the United States after moving to New York City in 1964. Chinmoy established his first meditation center in Queens, New York, and eventually had seven thousand students in 60 countries. He was an author, artist, poet, and musician; he also held public events such as concerts and meditations on the theme of inner peace. Chinmoy advocated a spiritual path to God through prayer and meditation. He advocated athleticism including distance running, swimming, and weightlifting. He organized marathons and other races, and was an active runner and, following a knee injury, weightlifter. Some ex-members have accused Chinmoy of running a cult.

== Biography ==
=== Early years in India ===
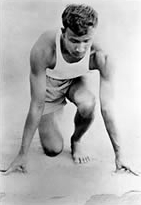
Chinmoy in his youth at the start of a sprint.

Chinmoy was the youngest of seven children, born in Shakpura, Boalkhali Upazila, in the Chittagong District of East Bengal, British India (now in Bangladesh). He lost his father to illness in 1943, and his mother a few months later. Chinmoy began his practice of meditation at the age of 11. In 1944, the 12-year-old Chinmoy joined his brothers and sisters at the Sri Aurobindo Ashram in Pondicherry, where his elder brothers Hriday and Chitta had already established a presence. It was Chitta that gave Chinmoy his name which means "full of divine consciousness".

In the ashram he spent the next 20 years in spiritual practice, including meditation, study in Bengali and English literature, athletics, and work in the ashram's cottage industries. Chinmoy claimed that for about eight years, he was the personal secretary to the General Secretary of the ashram, Nolini Kanta Gupta. Chinmoy translated his writings from Bengali into English.

=== Move to the United States ===
According to Sri Chinmoy, in 1964 he was prompted to move to the United States in response to a "message from within" to be of service to people in the West searching for spiritual fulfillment. With the help of Sam Spanier, Eric Hughes, and other American sponsors connected with the Sri Aurobindo Ashram, he emigrated to New York City.

He applied for a job as junior clerk at the Indian consulate, despite his lack of formal education. He received support and encouragement from his colleagues and bosses and was invited to give talks on Hinduism. He started to give talks at universities and later, at the United Nations.

In the late 1960s and early 1970s, Sri Chinmoy continued giving lectures and talks at universities around the U.S. on spiritual topics. In 1974, he gave lectures in 50 states at 50 universities, and these lectures were published as a six-part book series entitled 50 Freedom-Boats to One Golden Shore (1974). In the 1970s and 1980s he traveled around Europe, Asia, and Australia lecturing at universities, resulting in the publication of The Oneness of the Eastern Heart and the Western Mind. Chinmoy has also published books, essays, spiritual poetry, plays, and commentaries on the Vedas.

In 1966 Chinmoy opened a Sri Chinmoy Center in San Juan, Puerto Rico. Up until the late 1970s the main Sri Chinmoy study centers were in New York, Florida and the West Indies. Over the next few decades Sri Chinmoy Centers were opened and established in multiple cities in the US, Europe, Australasia, South Africa and South America totaling 350 centers worldwide. In 1973, the New York Times wrote that Sri Chinmoy was "revered in India as one of the few holy men to have reached Nirvikalpa Samadhi, the absolute highest level of consciousness".

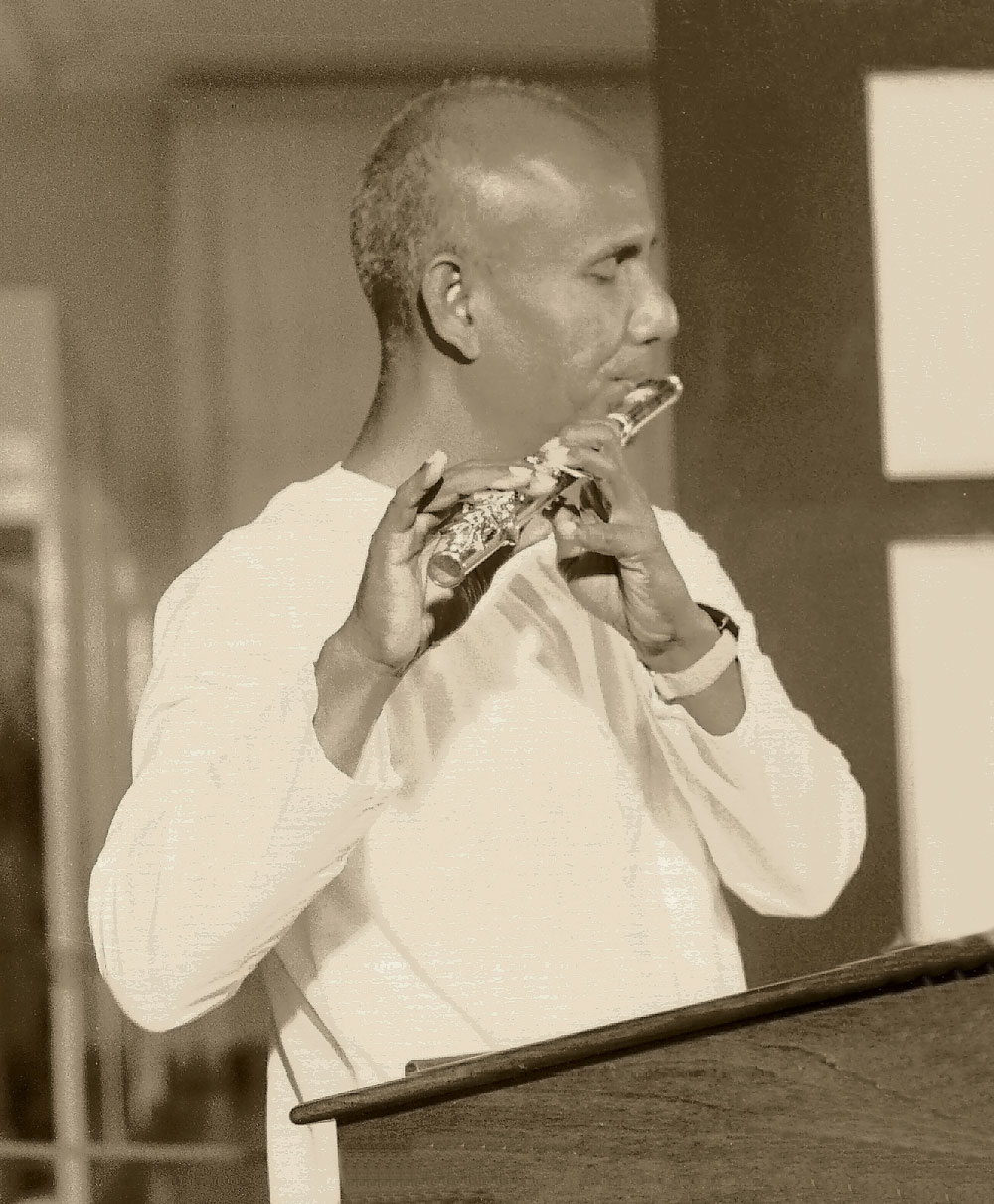
Sri Chinmoy playing flute

During the 1970s Chinmoy began playing and composing on the flute and esraj. In 1984, he started giving free 'Peace Concerts' around the world. The largest concert was in Montreal, for 19,000 people.

While in America in the 1970s, Sri Chinmoy attracted followers such as musicians Carlos Santana, John McLaughlin, Narada Michael Walden, Roberta Flack, Clarence Clemons, Premik Russell Tubbs and Boris Grebenshchikov. Sri Chinmoy offered the musicians a disciplined spiritual path that forbade the use of recreational drugs including alcohol and encouraged music and poetry as expressions of thankfulness to the Divine.

Santana and McLaughlin stayed with Sri Chinmoy for a number of years before leaving. In 1973 they released an album based on Sri Chinmoy's teachings, titled Love Devotion Surrender. McLaughlin was a Sri Chinmoy follower from 1970 to 1975. In 1971 he formed the Mahavishnu Orchestra, named for the spiritual name Sri Chinmoy had given him. McLaughlin introduced Santana to the guru, and Santana and his wife Deborah were subsequently Chinmoy followers from 1972 to 1981. Santana said, "Without a guru I serve only my own vanity, but with him I can be of service to you and everybody. I am the strings, but he is the musician. Guru has graduated from the Harvards of consciousness and sits at the feet of God." Under the spiritual name Devadip – meaning "Lamp of God", "Eye of God", and "Light of God" – that Chinmoy gave him, Santana released three albums: Illuminations (1974), Oneness (1979), and The Swing of Delight (1980). In 2000, he told Rolling Stone that things soured between him and Chinmoy in the 1980s. Santana emphasized that he took much that was good from his years with the guru, even though when he left, Sri Chinmoy "was vindictive for a while. He told all my friends not to call me ever again, because I was to drown in the dark sea of ignorance for leaving him." In 2017 Santana told Rolling Stone, "I'm really grateful for those 10 years I spent with that spiritual master."

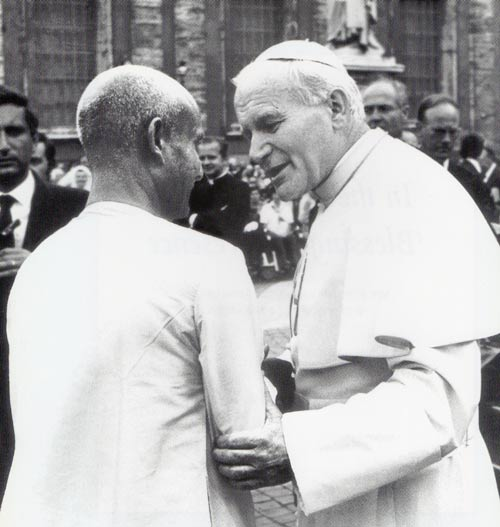
Sri Chinmoy and John Paul II in Vatican, 1980

Spiritual teacher Frederick Lenz became a follower around 1972, but in 1981 he broke with Sri Chinmoy and became a guru on his own. Spiritual author Lex Hixon was a member of the Sri Chinmoy Centre in the 1970s.

Sri Chinmoy advocated "self-transcendence" by expanding one's consciousness to conquer the mind's perceived limitations, and this was applied to athletics. Olympic gold-medalist runner Carl Lewis was advised by Sri Chinmoy. He learned to meditate from Sri Chinmoy, and practices the techniques regularly. A devoted Christian, Lewis stated that his involvement with Sri Chinmoy was a step forward to spiritual fulfillment which strengthened his Christian beliefs. In 2011 Lewis appeared in the short documentary Challenging Impossibility, which features the feats of strength demonstrated by Chinmoy.

According to the team's website, members of the Sri Chinmoy Marathon Team have swum the English Channel over 40 times. Other Chinmoy-sponsored athletic events include ultra-distance running, including the Self-Transcendence 3100 Mile Race; mountain climbing; and long-distance cycling. In 2010 Ashrita Furman, who holds over 150 Guinness World Records, stated that "the meditation he learned from Sri Chinmoy helps him to perform beyond his expectations."

In 1987 Sri Chinmoy inaugurated the Sri Chinmoy Oneness Home Peace Run, a relay style run for peace through many countries of the world where runners carry a flaming torch representing harmony. Sri Chinmoy described his concept as a "grassroots effort for peace". The 'Oneness Home' theme of the Peace Run, is that people are all peace-longing citizens on one single planet.

In 1991 Sri Chinmoy initiated the 'Oneness Heart Tears and Smiles' humanitarian service which sends food and medicine to those in need. The organisation, which as of 2007 served 136 countries, began with members of the Sri Chinmoy Centre distributing humanitarian aid to needy children and adults worldwide. It works with NGOs or governments, and provides health, medical, and educational supplies to recipient nations. It is served by health professionals and private volunteers on five continents, in programs which provide disaster relief, regional development, and health and medical supplies. The 'Kids to kids' program sponsored by the Oneness Heart Tears and Smiles encourages school children to prepare packs of school supplies and toys for disadvantaged children in other communities.

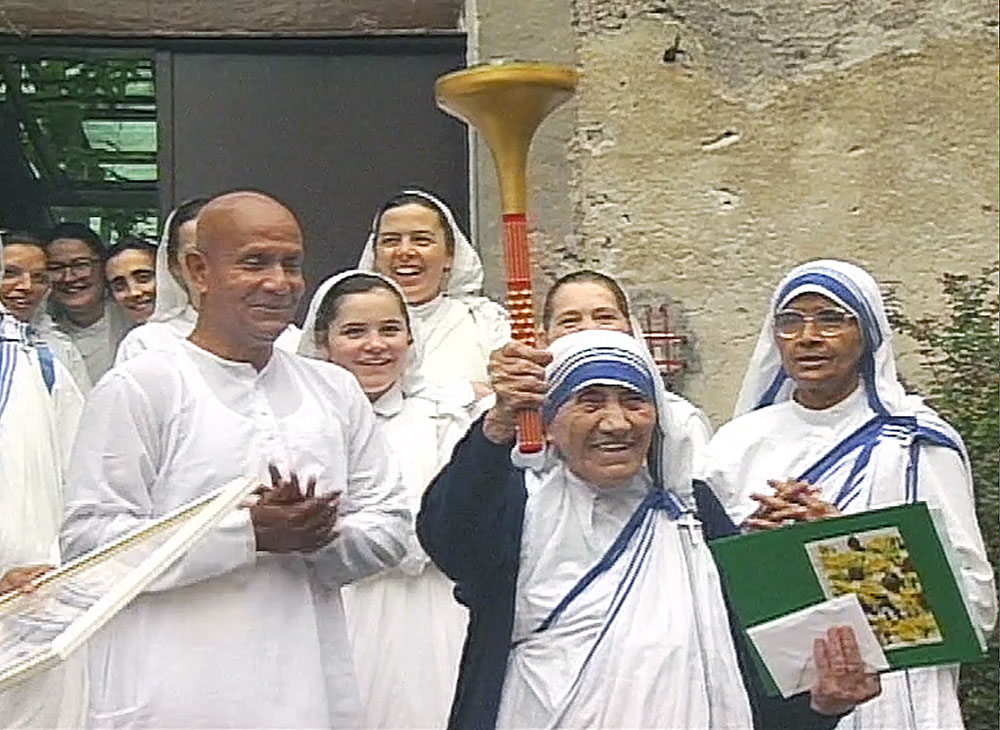
Sri Chinmoy and Mother Teresa

Chinmoy travelled and dedicated his many activities and the events he founded to peace. He met with world figures, and was described as an ambassador of peace. Chinmoy met Mother Teresa on five separate occasions. On their second meeting in Rome, Italy during October 1994, Sri Chinmoy presented her with an award. During the ceremony, Mother Teresa said to Sri Chinmoy: "I am so pleased with all the good work you are doing for world peace and for people in so many countries. May we continue to work together and to share together all for the glory of God and for the good of man." Chinmoy met with Diana, Princess of Wales, at Kensington Palace on 21 May 1997.

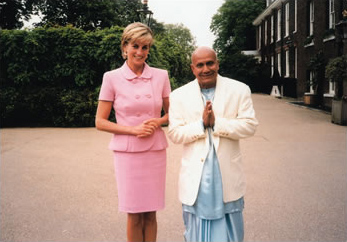
Diana, Princess of Wales, meeting Sri Chinmoy

He did not charge fees for his spiritual guidance or music performances. He was respectful towards all religions and religious figures of the world. He attracted an estimated 7,000 students in his lifetime. His path was a contemporary spiritual system of yoga, practised under the guidance of a guru, or spiritual teacher. Chinmoy advocated brahmacharya – celibacy – for both married and unmarried devotees, and focusing on experiencing inner spiritual joy rather than pleasure. According to a 1987 article in Hinduism Today, Chinmoy as a yoga spiritual master was an unmarried celibate. Unlike in some other older traditions, Chinmoy taught that a complete withdrawal from the world was not necessary for spiritual progress, but rather "a gradual and total Illumination of life".

=== Death ===
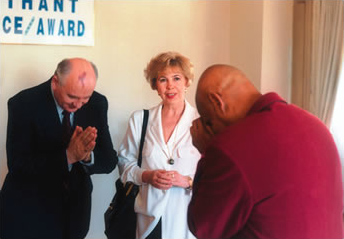
Sri Chinmoy with Mikhail Gorbachev

Chinmoy died from a heart attack while at his home in Jamaica, Queens, New York on 11 October 2007. Mikhail Gorbachev wrote that his death was a loss for the whole world and that he will remain a man who dedicated his whole life to peace.

== Controversy ==
The Chinmoy group has been described as a cult by some former members.

=== Sexual abuse of female disciples ===
The 1994 book The Joy of Sects stated that "some of his followers left, however, amid accusations that Chinmoy was making sexual advances towards the wives of his disciples", and in 2005 and 2014 San Diego CityBeat and Salon.com each posted a profile of a different female former disciple who alleged inappropriate sexual conduct.

Multiple former members of Sri Chinmoy's group have come forward to The New York Post stating Chinmoy summoned them to have sex with him and others. Anne Carlton says she was summoned to have sex with him for periods in 1991 and 1996, and in 2000 Chinmoy ordered her to have sex with another female disciple while he watched. An anonymous female disciple has stated that, in the 1980s, she was impregnated by Chinmoy, who paid her to get an abortion. A lawyer working for Chinmoy called these former disciples sexually troubled. Celia Corona-Doran has likewise stated that Chinmoy asked her to undress and have sex with another female disciple while he watched. Because of this, she left the religion. The disciples subjected to this sexual abuse were sworn to secrecy.

In February 2016 PIX 11 News in New York did two segments on Chinmoy, in which one former follower alleged sexual impropriety, while others praised Chinmoy. Sri Chinmoy was never sued or charged with any crime, and his lawyer denied the 2004 allegations at the time.

Some journalists and former followers have criticized what they view as Sri Chinmoy's obsessive or aggressive self-promotion.

In 2009, Jayanti Tamm published an account of life as a Chinmoy disciple, Cartwheels in a Sari: A Memoir of Growing Up Cult. Tamm, who was born into Chinmoy's organisation, claimed that Chinmoy predicted she would become his perfect disciple. She was banished from the group when she was 25. The book describes her life in the guru's inner circle and her efforts to break free from his influence. According to the book, Chinmoy banned sex, and most disciples were directed to remain single. The book also states that the guru disparaged secular education, and his prohibitions included the consumption of alcohol, caffeine, and meat; dancing; dating; socializing with outsiders; and owning pets, although he kept a collection of exotic pets in his Queens basement. Tamm notes however that the 7,000 other followers around the world, and others who encountered Chinmoy, are likely to have had different experiences and perceptions.

== Teachings ==
Sri Chinmoy taught that spiritual progress could be made by following a path of love, devotion, and surrender. He described divine love as self-offering and self-expansion. This practice of love and devotion to God is known as Bhakti Yoga. His path was not one of earthly renunciation or asceticism, but a middle path where the seeker has the opportunity to renounce or transform, the negative qualities which stand in the way of union with the Divine. Chinmoy taught that meditation on the heart brings the light of the soul forward to reach the highest reality as soon as possible. Chinmoy stated: "We are all seekers, and our goal is the same: to achieve inner peace, light and joy, to become inseparably one with our Source, and to lead lives full of true satisfaction." An integral element of Sri Chinmoy's teachings is the understanding of 'self-transcendence'. Self-transcendence is the practice of having a new goal and going beyond our previous capacities and limits which inevitably gives us joy. Self-transcendence is the goal of making progress in life by becoming a better human being rather than competing with the rest of the world. Chinmoy believed that we are unlimited in spirit.

Sri Chinmoy's philosophy he explains is the acceptance of life. By sharing goodwill and inspiration to others and serving mankind the world can be transformed and peace can be achieved.

He asked his disciples to adopt a vegetarian diet, abstain from recreational drugs including alcohol, and lead a pure and celibate lifestyle. Although influenced by Hinduism, his path catered to an international community of seekers from diverse backgrounds.

=== Meditation ===
Sri Chinmoy taught a range of techniques for meditation, those for calming and bringing silence to the mind, purifying the thoughts of the mind and meditating on the spiritual heart. Chinmoy explains that by keeping your mind calm and quiet for ten or fifteen minutes, a new experience can begin to dawn within you and this practice of stilling the mind is the root of all spiritual progress.

Sri Chinmoy recommended meditation during the quiet atmosphere of the early morning, before starting daily activities. As the traditional hour of God, between three and four a.m., known as the Brahma Muhurta, may not suit the western lifestyle of keeping late hours, Sri Chinmoy recommended for those newer to meditation to ideally meditate before seven a.m. Sri Chinmoy taught that both prayer and meditation are important, but there is a difference in the result. Prayer is a process of rising up to God and speaking to Him, and meditation is a practice of stilling the mind so that the God-presence can envelop us and commune with us. He also taught that reading spiritual writings or singing profound songs was useful to prepare for meditation or to remain in a meditative mood after practicing meditation. Chinmoy believed that running and physical fitness were a help to the inner spiritual life as well as to the outer life of activity, and encouraged his followers to run daily. Sri Chinmoy regarded the benefits of running as keeping the body fit and clearing the mind; he felt it can also be a form of external meditation.

==== United Nations ====
In 1970, Sri Chinmoy began giving twice-weekly non-denominational peace meditations at the United Nations for UN delegates, staff, and NGO representatives. In 1976, he stated, "The ideas of the United Nations are universal peace and universal brotherhood, and the ideals of the United Nations are a oneness-world-family and a oneness-heart."

After directing the peace meditations, which had been attended by many UN employees and diplomats, for 37 years, more than 700 UN officials, ambassadors, members of the U.S. Congress, and representatives of various religions, paid tributes to Chinmoy following his death during a posthumous celebration at the UN headquarters in New York. During the ceremony at the UN, Daw Aye Aye Thant, the daughter of former UN Secretary-General U Thant, said in her speech:

In a letter to Sri Chinmoy in April 1972, my father wrote, 'You have indeed instilled in the minds of hundreds of people here the moral and spiritual values which both of us cherish very dearly. I shall always cherish the memorable occasion of our meetings at the United Nations." ... I feel fortunate to have known Sri Chinmoy and to have been in his presence many times, and to have known many members of the Group.

=== Interfaith ===
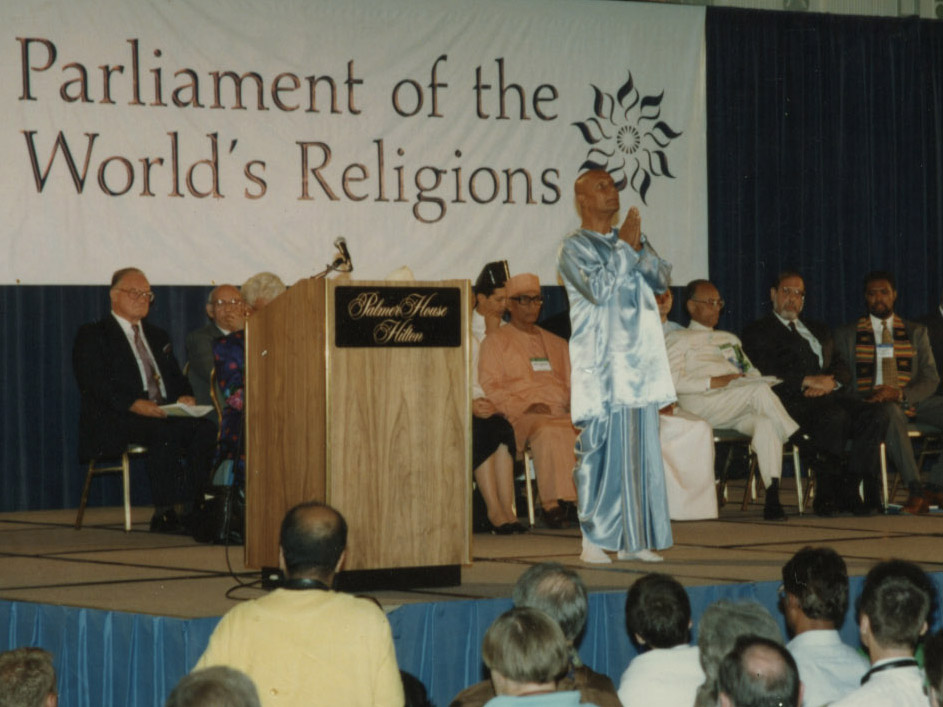
Sri Chinmoy giving opening meditation at the Parliament of World Religions, Chicago, 1993

An integral part of Sri Chinmoy's teaching is the respect for other paths and religions. Sri Chinmoy wrote:

True religion has a universal quality. It does not find fault with other religions. ... Forgiveness, compassion, tolerance, brotherhood and the feeling of oneness are the signs of a true religion.

Sri Chinmoy's efforts to promote inter-faith harmony resulted in him being invited to open the Parliament of the World's Religions in Chicago (1993) and Barcelona (2004) with a silent meditation. During the 2004 Opening Meditation, he said: "During my opening meditation I am praying for the oneness of all religions."

Sri Chinmoy said that although he was brought up in the Hindu tradition, he felt that his religion was the "Love of God".

== The arts ==
=== Artwork ===
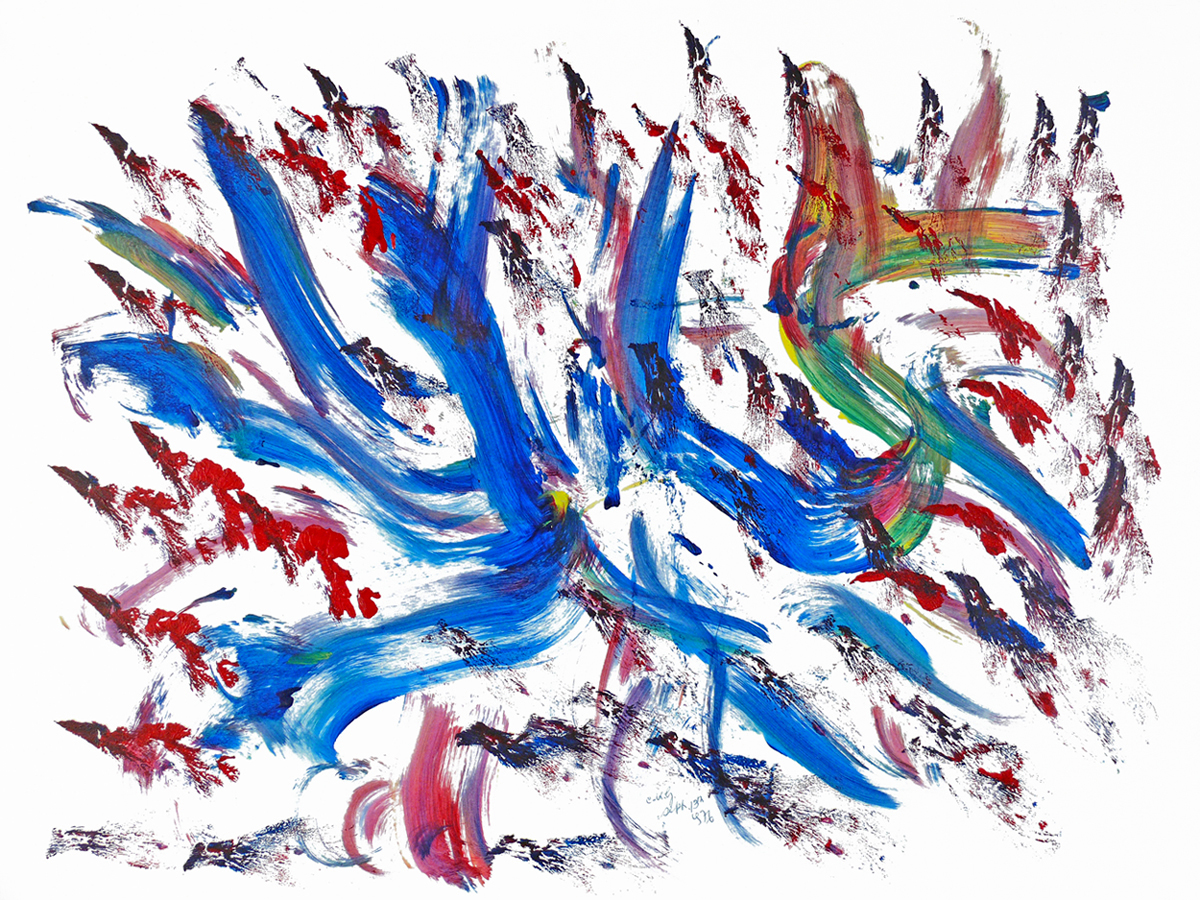
Jharna Kala painting by Chinmoy

Sri Chinmoy began painting in 1974 during a visit to Ottawa, Canada. He called his artwork "Jharna Kala", which in Bengali means "Fountain Art". Chinmoy's artwork is inspired by the themes of universal oneness and universal peace.

His abstract paintings are a mixture of acrylics and pen drawings. Sri Chinmoy used variety of sponges, brushes and colors to paint in a mystical style with vigour, strong movement and rhythm. Sri Chinmoy has said that when he paints he finds flow of creativity from the stillness of his meditation that allows him to follow an inner inspiration or 'streak of light' to follow. In December 1991 Chinmoy started a new series of art-work entitled "Dream-Freedom-Peace-Birds" or 'Soul Birds'. The bird drawings are often simple zen like sketches that have either one bird or in some paintings hundreds of birds in one large drawing. The soul bird drawings, Sri Chinmoy stated, symbolize humanity's heart cry for freedom.

His art has been displayed in the UNESCO offices in Paris, London's Victoria and Albert Museum, the Mall Gallery in London, the Museum of Modern Art in St. Petersburg, John F. Kennedy International Airport in New York, and the United Nations Headquarters.

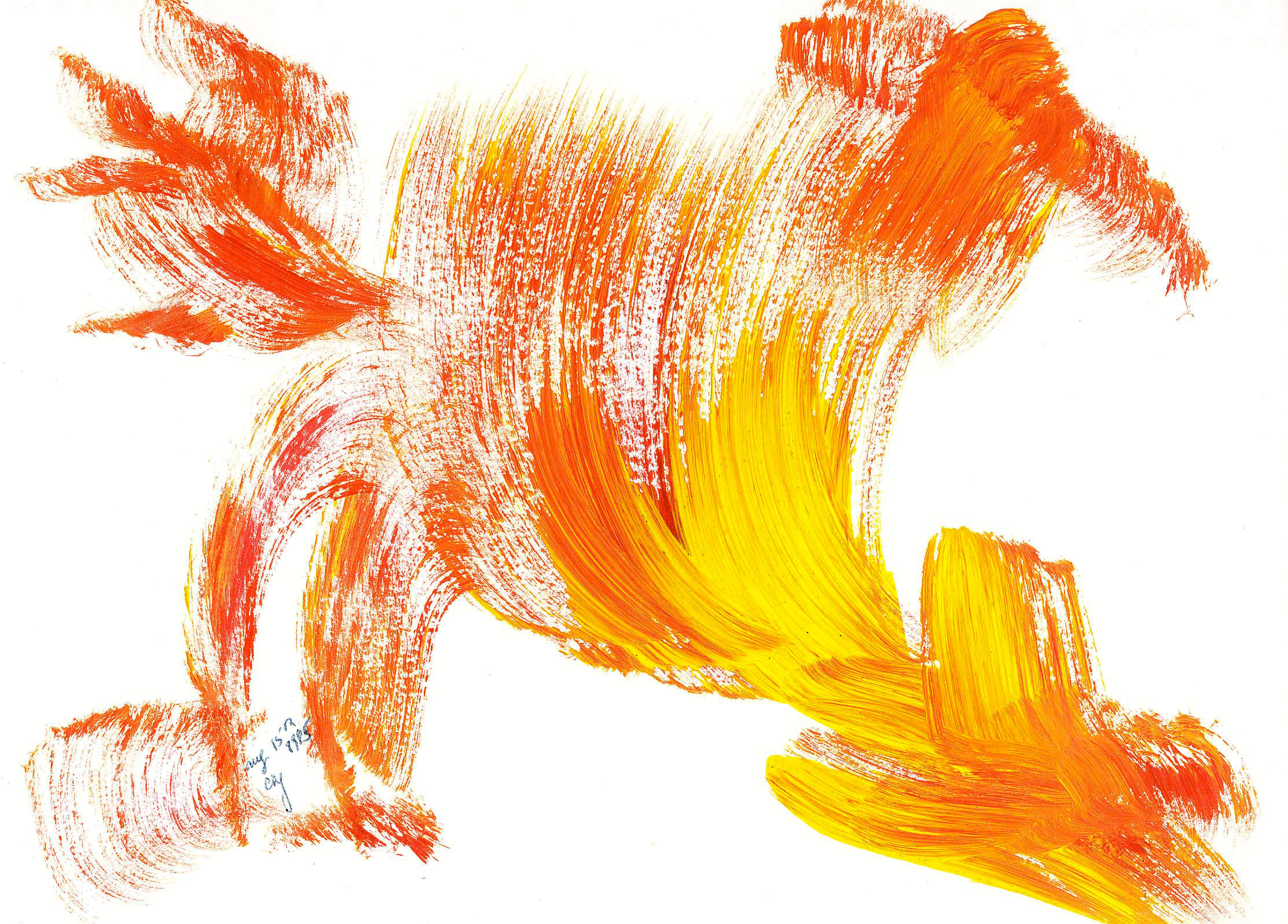
Acrylic by Sri Chinmoy

=== Music ===
According to his followers, Sri Chinmoy composed thousands of short musical compositions, written with lyrics primarily in Bengali and English. Many of these have been published online under a Creative Commons license at Sri Chinmoy Songs (lyrics and sheet music) and Radio Sri Chinmoy (audio). He released two albums in Jamaica on the Studio One subsidiary label Port-O-Jam. In 1976, Sri Chinmoy released a meditative album on Folkways Records entitled Music for Meditation.

Sri Chinmoy also gave hundreds of peace concerts, many of them free. He gave concerts in venues around the world, including London's Royal Albert Hall, New York's Lincoln Center and Carnegie Hall, Tokyo's Nippon Budokan, the Eiffel Tower in Paris, and the Sydney Opera House. Sri Chinmoy played a number of different instruments at his concerts including the flute, esraj, piano, cello and other Eastern and Western instruments.

=== Poetry ===
According to the Sri Chinmoy Centre, Sri Chinmoy published over 1,300 books including 120,000 poems. Many of these poems are aphorisms – a short but complete spiritual poem or verse, such as "We are all truly unlimited, if we only dare to try and have faith." Chinmoy also published some volumes of longer more classical style poetry. In 2001, Chinmoy recited his poetry at the United Nations, as part of a UN sponsored event of promoting "Dialogue Among Civilizations Through Poetry".

Sri Chinmoy's writing has been praised by many, including Archbishop Desmond Tutu, who wrote: "These sweet gems of wisdom written by my dear friend Sri Chinmoy are timeless truths full of encouragement, love and goodness. These chapters fill us with indomitable hope and enthusiasm for life."

== Athleticism ==
=== Running ===
In 1977 the Sri Chinmoy Marathon Team was founded; it holds running, swimming, and cycling events worldwide, from fun runs to ultramarathons. Its precursor was the 1976 Liberty Torch Run, a relay in which 33 runners marked America's bicentennial by covering 8,800 miles in 7 weeks through 50 states. This concept was expanded in 1987 to become the Sri Chinmoy Oneness-Home Peace Run. The Peace Run is generally held every two years, and the first was launched in April 1987 at the World Trade Center in New York City.

In 1985 Sri Chinmoy, with the then Mayor of Oxford, inaugurated the first "Sri Chinmoy Peace Mile", which is a measured mile in Cutteslowe Park, Oxford giving joggers something against which to measure their progress. There are now numerous "Peace Miles" around the world.

Many of Sri Chinmoy's followers run daily for health and physical fitness. Sri Chinmoy himself continued to enter races until his 60s when a knee injury hampered his ability to run; afterwards he turned his attention to tennis and weightlifting.

Sri Chinmoy also founded the Self-Transcendence 6- & 10-day Races, which run concurrently in Queens each April, and the Self-Transcendence 3100 Mile Race, described by The New York Times as the "Mount Everest of ultramarathons".

The Self-Transcendence Marathon is a marathon around the shores of Rockland Lake State Park, located in Congers, New York, north of New York City. Inaugurated in 2002, the event attracts around 900 international runners. The Marathon takes place in the last week of August.

=== Weightlifting ===
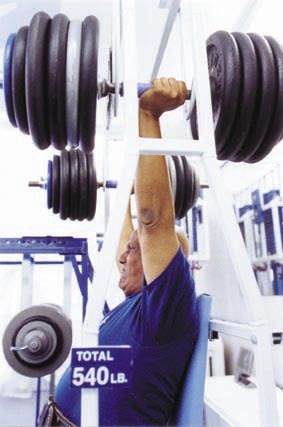
Sri Chinmoy weightlifting

Sri Chinmoy began weightlifting in 1985, at the age of 54. His weightlifting included an array of objects and machinery designed to challenge his strength and ability. His message to the public in his weightlifting endeavours was that anything is possible if one is able to put aside the limitations of the mind. Bill Pearl, former Mr. Universe, acted as Master of Ceremonies at many of Chinmoy's strength exhibitions. Introducing one of Chinmoy's weightlifting exhibitions in 1999, Bill Pearl wrote: "Today you are going to see some amazing feats of strength that I myself – and I have been in the industry for fifty-five years – would not even attempt to perform." Chinmoy said his motivation for lifting was to inspire others, especially those of an older generation.

In a program created in 1998 known as 'Lifting up the world with a Oneness Heart', Sri Chinmoy lifted well- known people while they stood on a platform overhead. Sri Chinmoy stated: 'I lift them up to show my appreciation for their achievements,' Among some of the 7000 people he lifted include: Nelson Mandela, Desmond Tutu, Muhammad Ali, Sting, Eddie Murphy, Susan Sarandon, Roberta Flack, Yoko Ono, Jeff Goldblum, Richard Gere, and Helen Hunt. Twenty Nobel laureates and a team of sumo wrestlers were also lifted.

In April 2011, a documentary film about Sri Chinmoy's weightlifting titled Challenging Impossibility was featured at the Tribeca Film Festival.

Terry Todd, a former powerlifter and latterly professor of kinesiology at the University of Texas, concluded that Sri Chinmoy misrepresented the type and weight of some of the lifts he claimed to have completed.

== Awards ==
A summary of award highlights includes:

- Visva Sama Duta, meaning "Ambassador of Universal Peace", title conferred by the Asgiriya Order of Buddhist Monks in 1990. The first non-Buddhist in Sri Lankan history to receive such an honorary degree.
- Mahatma Gandhi Universal Harmony Award received jointly with Coretta Scott King, widow of Martin Luther King Jr., from the American branch of the Indian cultural institute Bharatiya Vidya Bhavan in 1994.
- Fred Lebow Award, in the name of the founder of the New York City Marathon, presented by NYC Marathon Director Allan Steinfeld and Umberto Silvestri, President of the Rome Marathon in 1996.
- Hindu of the Year (1997) and Hindu Renaissance Award presented by the international magazine Hinduism Today in 1997, honouring him for teaching a yoga which combines aspects of ancient Hinduism in a modern setting.
- Pilgrim of Peace prize from the 'International Center of Assisi for Peace among Peoples' in 1998.
- Mother Teresa Award presented by President of the Republic of Macedonia Boris Trajkovski in 2001.
- Medal of Honor For the Cause of Peace and Friendship Among Nations presented by Vietnamese Ambassador to the United Nations Le Luong Minh in 2004.
- Honorary Doctorate of Humanities in Peace Studies presented by the Science Council committee of Cambodia's International University in a unanimous decision in 2005.
- 2012 Class of Honorees, International Marathon Swimming Hall of Fame, including honouring the Sri Chinmoy Marathon Team with swimming the English Channel 38 times.

== Bibliography ==
- (1972) Arise! Awake! Thoughts of a Yogi – Frederick Fell Inc
- (1974) Yoga and the Spiritual Life – Aum Publications
- (1974) The Inner Promise: Paths to Self Perfection – Wildwood House
- (1974) Samadhi and Siddhi – The Summits of God Life – Aum Publications
- (1974) The Dance of Life – Volume 1 -20 – Agni Press
- (1975) Astrology, the Supernatural and the Beyond – Aum Publications
- (1977) Everest Aspiration – Aum Publications
- (1977) The Soul's Evolution – Agni Press (ISBN 0-88497-396-4)
- (1984) Inner and Outer Peace – Peace Publishing (ISBN 0-88497-769-2)
- (1985) The Master and the Disciple – Insights into the Guru-Disciple Relationship – Agni Press (ISBN 978-0884978848)
- (1986) A Child's Heart and a Child's Dreams – Aum Publications
- (1988) Beyond Within – Agni Press
- (1989) Meditation: Man-Perfection in God-Satisfaction – Aum Publications
- (1990) On Wings of Silver Dreams – Aum Publications
- (1992) Kundalini: The Mother-Power – Aum Publications
- (1994) Garden of the Soul – Health Communications Inc.
- (1994) My Life's Soul-Journey – Aum Publications
- (1997) God Is... – Aum Publications
- (1997) The Wings of Joy: Finding Your Path to Inner Peace – Simon and Schuster
- (1998) Blessingful invitations from the university-world - Agni Press
- (2000) Wisdom of Sri Chinmoy – Motilal Banarsidass Publ.
- (2007) Power Within: Secrets of Spirituality and Ocultism – Guru Noka Publications
- (2007) Heart-Garden – New Holland Publishing
- (2009) A Selection of Songs composed by Sri Chinmoy, Vol. 1 – Sri Chinmoy Center
- (2010) The Jewels of Happiness – Watkins Publishing
- (2013) Sport and Meditation – The Golden Shore (ISBN 978-3-89532-213-6)

=== Poetry ===
- (1979–1983) Ten Thousand Flower-Flames – Agni Press (100 volumes)
- (1983–1998) Twenty-Seven Thousand Aspiration-Plants – Agni Press (270 volumes)
- (1998–2007) Seventy-Seven Thousand Service-Trees – Agni Press (50 volumes... unfinished)
- (1973) The Dance of Life
- (1974) The Wings of Light
- (2000–2007) My Christmas-New Year-Vacation-Aspiration-Prayers (51 volumes)

=== Plays ===
- (1973) Sri Ramachandra – My Rama is My All – A play on the life of Sri Ramachandra
- (1973) The Singer of the Eternal Beyond – A play on the life of Sri Krishna
- (1973) Siddhartha Becomes The Buddha – A Play on the life of Lord Buddha
- (1973) The Son – A play on the life of Jesus Christ
- (1973) Lord Gauranga: Love Incarnate – A Play on the life of Sri Chaitanya
- (1973) Drink, Drink, My Mother's Nectar – A play on the life of Sri Ramakrishna
- (1973) The Heart of a Holy Man – various plays on spiritual figures
- (1973) Supreme Sacrifice – a book of spiritual plays
- (1974) The Descent of the Blue – A play about the life of Sri Aurobindo
