= Sam Spanier =

American artist from New York City, who helped to develop the Integral Yoga movement

Samuel Louis Spanier (1925–2008) was an American artist from New York City, who worked in painting, theater, and film, and also helped to develop the Integral Yoga movement in the United States.

== Early life ==
Sam Spanier was born in New York City on May 6, 1925, the child of Isadore Spanier, a jeweler and diamond merchant, and his wife, Rose Brecher Spanier. The family moved to Brooklyn in 1927, where his sister, Bernice (later known as Leslie Spanier Linchuk), was born in 1929.

As a boy, Spanier attended P.S. 99 in Brooklyn, and also spent two years as a student at the Talmud Torah Yeshiva, after which he returned again to P.S. 99. He had his bar mitzvah in 1938. That year he also had his first experience as an actor, and was drawn to make that his career. Following grammar school, he was sent to a vocational high school, where he studied jewelry design, and, in 1941, received the Macy’s Scholastic Award for Achievement in Creative Art, for two of his jewelry designs. He had also begun painting by 1940.

== Early career ==
Spanier left school at fifteen and traveled to Los Angeles, where he lived for part of a year with relatives. Upon his return to New York, he worked as a jeweler and then as a diamond cutter in Manhattan’s diamond district. During that time, he also spent two years on scholarship, at the Neighborhood Playhouse Theatre School, where he studied acting with Sanford Meisner and movement and dance with Martha Graham. His first professional acting job was in a Summer Stock company in Bridgeton, Maine, where his colleagues included Julie Harris and Anne Meacham. He became a member of Actor's Equity in 1945 (first enrolled under his middle name, Louis Spanier) and went on to have minor roles on stage and in film, including A Flag is Born (1946) and The Ambassador’s Daughter (1956). In 1943, Spanier enlisted in the Air Force, but was honorably discharged the same year. He continued working as a diamond cutter through the remaining years of the war.

In 1949, Spanier traveled to Taos, New Mexico, where he studied for several months with the artist Louis Ribak (1902-1979), founder of the Taos Valley Art School (in 1947). Ribak and his wife, Beatrice Mandelman, were members of the “Taos Moderns” group, and introduced Spanier to both Mabel Dodge Luhan and Freida Lawrence.

Following his return to New York from Taos, Spanier continued to take evening drawing classes at NYU with Samuel Adler (1898-1979). He spent part of the summer of 1949 in Provincetown, Massachusetts, where he modeled at the Hans Hofmann School. Also in 1949, Spanier made his first trip to Paris, where he became friends with the Canadian painter Stephen Andrews (1922-1995), who introduced Spanier to the spiritual teachings of G.I. Gurdjieff and P.D. Ouspensky, and the circle of Gurdjieff’s disciple Mme. Jeanne Matignon de Salzmann (1889-1990). In 1949-50, following his return to New York, Spanier became a student at the Hans Hofmann School in New York City.

== Spiritual studies ==
Spanier returned to Paris in 1950-51, and many times in subsequent years. His Paris acquaintances included James Baldwin, Beauford Delaney, Lutka Pink, and Paul Jenkins. By 1952, Spanier had become more deeply involved with Mme. De Salzmann’s work, later continuing under the guidance of Ilonka Karasz Nyland (1896-1981) for a period of six years. Spanier eventually left the Gurdjieff work, and in 1960 became immersed in the teachings of Sri Aurobindo (Aurobindo Ghose, 1872-1950) and Mirra Alfassa (known as The Mother, 1878-1973), through a New York center founded by Eleanor Moore Montgomery. Spanier became a disciple of the Integral Yoga philosophy, which led him travel twice to the Sri Aurobindo Ashram in Pondicherry, India, where he received darshan from The Mother in 1962 and 1964. Spanier’s second trip to India was made with his lifelong partner, Eric Hughes, whom he had met in 1959. It was during the first trip that Spanier received inspiration to found a spiritual center in the United States, based on Sri Aurobindo’s teachings, and, in August 1968, he and Eric Hughes founded Matagiri, in Woodstock, New York. The two also sponsored the emigration of Sri Chinmoy to the United States at this time, and he lived for a while at their Greenwich Village apartment and regularly visited Matagiri.

== Artistic career ==
Sam Spanier’s artwork received early critical recognition. He had his first solo New York exhibition in 1953, with six solo shows between 1953 and 59—at Urban Gallery, Gallery Mayer, and Wittenborn Gallery. His work was represented in the 1955 Carnegie International, and he was selected by Gordon Bailey Washburn for inclusion in the 1954 Exhibition of Oil Paintings, at New York City Center Gallery. In 1953, he was chosen by Hans Hofmann and Milton Avery to receive the (Dolia) Lorian Fund Award. In France, he was included in exhibitions at the Musée d’Art Moderne, Paris (1952, 1954) and the Musée des Beaux-Arts, Paris (1956). And he was included in the 1962 exhibition, Recent Paintings USA: The Figure, at the Museum of Modern Art.

Following Spanier’s self-imposed separation from the mainstream New York art world in the early 1960s, and his final move to Woodstock in 1968, he continued to make art, up until his death in 2008. Late in life, he began exhibiting again, also making annual trips to Paris to work on his art. Several surveys of his work were presented between 1986 and his death in 2008. These included a solo exhibition in New York City at the Limner Gallery (1988) and a Retrospective exhibition at the Fletcher Gallery in Woodstock (1999).

In 1985 Sam Spanier was elected to the Board of Directors of the Woodstock Artists Association. He received the Association’s Lucile Blanch Award in 1988, and in 2007 was honored by the Woodstock Artists Association with a Lifetime Achievement Award.

== Death ==
Samuel Spanier died in Woodstock, New York, January 30, 2008.
