= Italy at the World Mountain Running Championships =

ITA at the World Mountain Running Championships
- National federation: FIDAL
- Website: www.fidal.it
- Medals: Gold 0 Silver 0 Bronze 0 Total 0

World Mountain Running Championships appearances
- auto

Italy has participated in all editions of the World Mountain Running Championships, since the first edition of 1985 World Mountain Running Championships.

== Men ==
=== Individual ===
Year	Rank and runner	Team
Edition 1 (Italy); 1985 San Vigilio di Marebbe	1. Alfonso Valicella (gold); 3. Fausto Bonzi (bronze); 4. Claudio Simi; 7. Privato Pezzoli	1. (Italy) ITA (gold)
Edition 2 (Italy); 1986 Morbegno	1. Alfonso Valicella (gold); 6. Costantino Bertolla; 7.Privato Pezzoli: 8. Luigi Bortoluzzi; 11. Claudio Galeazzi; 16. Davide Pozzi; 20. Ivo Rovelli; 24. Claudio Bonzi	1. (Italy) ITA (gold)
Edition 3 (Switzerland); 1987 Lenzerheide	5. Pio Tomaselli; 6. Privato Pezzoli; 13. Alfonso Valicella; 19. Claudio Galeazzi	1. (Italy) ITA (gold)
Edition 4 (England); 1988 Keswick	1. Dino Tadello (gold); 2. Davide Milesi (silver); 4. Luigi Bortoluzzi; 10. Privato Pezzoli	1. (Italy) ITA (gold)
Edition 5 (France); 1989 Die e Chatillon-en-Diois	2. Costantino Bertolla (silver); 3. Luigi Bortoluzzi (bronze); 7. Fabio Ciaponi	1. (Italy) ITA (gold)
Edition 6 (Austria); 1990 Telfes	1. Costantino Bertolla (gold); 3. Luigi Bortoluzzi (bronze); 7. Fabio Ciaponi; 17. Privato Pezzoli	1. (Italy) ITA (gold)
Edition 7 (Switzerland); 1991 Zermatt	5. Costantino Bertolla; 6. Davide Milesi; 9. Marco Toini; 12. Bortolo Saio	1. (Italy) ITA (gold)
Edition 8 (Italy); 1992 Val di Susa	3. Costantino Bertolla (bronze); 8. Marco Toini; 13. Claudio Amati; 21. Fabio Ciaponi; 48. Andrea Agostini	2. (Italy) ITA (silver)
Edition 9 (France); 1993 Gap	6. Costantino Bertolla; 11. Adriano Pezzoli; 12. Antonio Molinari; 14. Fabio Ciaponi; 17. Battista Lizzoli; 19. Lucio Fregona	1. (Italy) ITA (gold)
Edition 10 (Germany); 1994 Berchtesgaden	5. Galdino Pilot; 12. Costantino Bertolla; 18. Claudio Amati; 27. Andrea Agostini; 37. Roberto Barbi	1. (Italy) ITA (gold)
Year	Rank and runner	Team
Edition 11 (Scotland); 1995 Edimburgo	1. Lucio Fregona (gold); 3. Marco Toini (bronze); 4. Antonio Molinari; 5. Andrea Agostini; 6. Roberto Barbi; 16. Gino Caneva	1. (Italy) ITA (gold)
Edition 12 (Austria); 1996 Telfes	1. Antonio Molinari (gold); 2. Severino Bernardini (silver); 6. Lucio Fregona; 15. Massimo Galliano; 18. Costantino Bertolla; 21. Claudio Amati	1. (Italy) ITA (gold)
Edition 13 (Czech Republic); 1997 Malé Svatonovice	1. Marco De Gasperi (gold); 2. Davide Milesi (silver); 7. Lucio Fregona; 8. Antonio Molinari; 14. Carmelo Traini; 36. Danilo Bosio	1. (Italy) ITA (gold)
Edition 14 (France); 1998 Dimitile La Reunion	2. Antonio Molinari (silver); 7. Davide Milesi; 12. Massimo Galliano; 20. Lucio Fregona; 35. Marco De Gasperi	1. (Italy) ITA (gold)
Edition 15 (Malaysia); 1999 Mount Kinabalu Park	1. Marco De Gasperi (gold); 3. Gino Caneva (bronze); 6. Lucio Fregona; 13. Antonio Molinari; 51. Simone Lenzi	1. (Italy) ITA (gold)
Edition 16 (Germany); 2000 Bergen	5. Sergio Chiesa; 10. Massimo Galliano; 15. Antonio Molinari; 16. Roberto Calandro; 17. Marco De Gasperi; 47. Davide Milesi	1. (Italy) ITA (gold)
Edition 17 (Italy); 2001 Arta Terme	1. Marco De Gasperi (gold); 2. Emanuele Manzi (silver); 5. Lucio Fregona; 11. Alessio Rinaldi; 16. Antonio Molinari; 18. Andrea Agostini	1. (Italy) ITA (gold)
Edition 18 (Austria); 2002 Innsbruck	5. Marco Gaiardo; 8. Antonio Molinari; 9. Marco De Gasperi; 15. Emanuele Manzi; 36. Davide Milesi; 43. Alessio Rinaldi	1. (Italy) ITA (gold)
Edition 19 (United States); 2003 Girdwood (Alaska)	1. Marco De Gasperi (gold); 3. Marco Gaiardo (bronze); 7. Emanuele Manzi; 13. Claudio Cassi; 17. Alessio Rinaldi; 37. Marco Agostini	1. (Italy) ITA (gold)
Edition 20 (Italy); 2004 Sauze d`Oulx	6. Marco Gaiardo; 9. Marco De Gasperi; 11. Davide Chicco; 18. Gabriele Abate; 21. Roberto Porro; 25. Antonio Molinari	1. (Italy) ITA (gold)
Year	Rank and runner	Team
Edition 21 (New Zealand); 2005 Wellington	2. Gabriele Abate (silver); 3. Davide Chicco (bronze); 4. Marco Gaiardo; 8. Emanuele Manzi; 11. Alessio Rinaldi; 44. Antonio Molinari	1. (Italy) ITA (gold)
Edition 22 (Turkey); 2006 Bursa-Uludag	5. Marco De Gasperi; 6. Marco Gaiardo; 15. Gabriele Abate; 18. Davide Chicco; 26. Emanuele Manzi; 36. Diego Filippi	2. (Italy) ITA (silver)
Edition 23 (Switzerland); 2007 Ovronnaz	1. Marco De Gasperi (gold); 6. Marco Gaiardo; 11. Gabriele Abate; 12. Andrea Regazzoni; 19. Marco Rinaldi; 23. Davide Chicco	1. (Italy) ITA (gold)
Edition 24 (Switzerland); 2008 Crans-Montana	4. Bernard Dematteis; 8. Marco De Gasperi; 11. Marco Gaiardo; 20. Gabriele Abate; 22. Hannes Rungger; 37. Emanuele Manzi	1. (Italy) ITA (gold)
Edition 25 (Italy); 2009 Campodolcino	4. Bernard Dematteis; 8. Marco De Gasperi; 9. Martin Dematteis; 18. Emanuele Manzi; 22. Gabriele Abate; 29. Marco Gaiardo	2. (Italy) ITA (silver)
Edition 26 (Slovenia); 2010 Kamnik	11. Gabriele Abate; 17. Marco De Gasperi; 24. Bernard Dematteis; 25. Antonio Toninelli; 35. Gerd Frick; 37. Tommaso Vaccina	3. (Italy) ITA (bronze)
Edition 27 (Albania); 2011 Tirana	3. Martin Dematteis (bronze); 4. Bernard Dematteis; 5. Marco De Gasperi; 14. Gabriele Abate; 16. Emanuele Manzi; 24. Alex Baldaccini	1. (Italy) ITA (gold)
Edition 28 (Italy); 2012 Temu-Ponte di Legno	5. Gabriele Abate; 6. Alex Baldaccini; 7. Marco De Gasperi; 13. Xavier Chevrier; 19. Bernard Dematteis; 49. Antonio Toninelli	2. (Italy) ITA (silver)
Edition 29 (Poland); 2013 Krynica-Zdroj	5. Bernard Dematteis; 10. Martin Dematteis; 11. Alex Baldaccini; 14. Gabriele Abate; 17. Luca Cagnati; 22. Xavier Chevrier	2. (Italy) ITA (silver)
Edition 30 (Italy); 2014 Cassette di Massa	4. Bernard Dematteis; 13. Martin Dematteis; 14. Xavier Chevrier; 24. Luca Cagnati; 35. Alex Baldaccini; 42. Tommaso Vaccina	3. (Italy) ITA (bronze)
Year	Rank and runner	Team
Edition 31 (United Kingdom); 2015 Betws-y-Coed	2. Bernard Dematteis (silver); 4. Martin Dematteis; 7. Xavier Chevrier; 12. Alex Baldaccini; 16. Luca Cagnati; 18. Alessandro Rambaldini	1. (Italy) ITA (gold)
Edition 32 (Bulgaria); 2016 Sapareva-Banja	6. Bernard Dematteis; 8. Martin Dematteis; 9. Alex Baldaccini; 10. Xavier Chevrier; 18. Francesco Puppi; 48. Nicola Spada	2. (Italy) ITA (silver)
Edition 33 (Italy); 2017 Premana	5. Xavier Chevrier; 6. Bernard Dematteis; 11. Martin Dematteis; 12. Cesare Maestri	2. (Italy) ITA (silver)
Edition 24 (Andorra); 2018 Canillo	7. Francesco Puppi; 8. Martin Dematteis; 9. Bernard Dematteis; 12. Nadir Cavagna	Silver
Edition 25 (Argentina); 2019 Villa la Angostura	2. Cesare Maestri (silver); 9. Xavier Chevrier; 24. Alex Baldaccini; 30. Nadir Cavagna	Bronze

=== Medal table individual ===
Runner	Individual				Team				Total			
Runner	1st place, gold medalist(s)	2nd place, silver medalist(s)	3rd place, bronze medalist(s)	Tot	1st place, gold medalist(s)	2nd place, silver medalist(s)	3rd place, bronze medalist(s)	Tot	1st place, gold medalist(s)	2nd place, silver medalist(s)	3rd place, bronze medalist(s)	Tot
Marco De Gasperi	5	0	0	5	11	3	1	14	16	3	1	19
Alfonso Valicella	2	0	0	2	3	0	0	3	5	0	0	5
Costantino Bertolla	1	1	1	3	7	1	0	8	8	2	1	11
Antonio Molinari	1	1	0	2	11	0	0	11	12	1	0	13
Lucio Fregona	1	0	0	1	7	0	0	7	8	0	0	8
Dino Tadello	1	0	0	1	1	0	0	1	2	0	0	2
Davide Milesi	0	2	0	2	6	0	0	6	6	2	0	8
Emanuele Manzi	0	1	0	1	6	2	0	8	6	3	0	9
Gabriele Abate	0	1	0	1	5	4	1	10	5	5	1	11
Bernard Dematteis	0	1	0	1	3	6	2	11	3	7	2	12
Fausto Bonzi	0	1	0	1	2	0	0	2	2	1	0	3
Severino Bernardini	0	1	0	1	1	0	0	1	1	0	1	2
Luigi Bortoluzzi	0	0	2	2	4	0	0	4	4	0	2	6
Marco Gaiardo	0	0	1	1	6	2	0	8	6	2	1	9
Davide Chicco	0	0	1	1	3	1	0	4	3	1	1	5
Martin Dematteis	0	0	1	1	2	5	1	8	2	5	2	9
Marco Toini	0	0	1	1	2	1	0	3	2	1	1	4
Gino Caneva	0	0	1	1	2	0	0	2	2	0	1	3

=== Medal table team ===
Team	Gold	Silver	Bronze	Total
(Italy) Italia	24	7	2	33

== Women ==
=== Individual ===
Year	Rank and runner	Team
Edition 1 (Italy); 1985 San Vigilio di Marebbe	2. Chiara Saporetti (silver); 3. Guidina Dal Sasso (bronze); 4. Valentina Bottarelli; 7. Sonia Basso	1. (Italy) ITA (gold)
Edition 2 (Italy); 1986 Morbegno	2. Valentina Bottarelli (gold); 6. Lucia Soranzo; 9. Sonia Basso; 10. Gemma Gaddo; 13. Maria Cocchetti; 19. Cristina Porta; 21. Tiziana Pasini; 23. Claudia Priotti	2. (Italy) ITA (silver)
Edition 3 (Switzerland); 1987 Lenzerheide	3. Giuliana Savaris (bronze); 6. Maria Cocchetti; 7. Lucia Soranzo; 19. Cristina Porta	1. (Italy) ITA (gold)
Edition 4 (England); 1988 Keswick	4. Giuliana Savaris; 5. Grazia Magili; 10. Maria Cocchetti; 16. Valentina Bottarelli	2. (Italy) ITA (silver)
Edition 5 (France); 1989 Die e Chatillon-en-Diois	3. Manuela Di Centa (bronze); 7. Maria Cocchetti; 11. Giuliana Savaris; 16. Maria Grazia Roberti	1. (Italy) ITA (gold)
Edition 6 (Austria); 1990 Telfes	2. Maria Cocchetti (silver); 8. Antonella Molinari; 15. Guidina Dal Sasso; 20. Giuliana Savaris	2. (Italy) ITA (silver)
Edition 7 (Switzerland); 1991 Zermatt	2. Manuela Di Centa (silver); 7. Maria Cocchetti; 13. Maria Grazia Roberti; 16. Pina Deiana	3. (Italy) ITA (bronze)
Edition 8 (Italy); 1992 Val di Susa	10. Antonella Molinari; 11. Maria Grazia Roberti; 28. Giuliana Savaris; 32. Ornella Cadamuro	4. (Italy) ITA
Edition 9 (France); 1993 Gap	4. Nives Curti; 5. Maria Grazia Roberti; 8. Valeria Colpo; 9. Antonella Molinari	1. (Italy) ITA (gold)
Edition 10 (Germany); 1994 Berchtesgaden	4. Nives Curti; 14. Maria Grazia Roberti; 17. Antonella Molinari; 36. Mirela Cabodi	3. (Italy) ITA (bronze)
Year	Rank and runner	Team
Edition 11 (Scotland); 1995 Edimburgo	3. Nives Curti (bronze); 8. Mirella Cabodi; 9. Maria Grazia Roberti; 25. Valeria Colpo	2. (Italy) ITA (silver)
Edition 12 (Austria); 1996 Telfes	5. Flavia Gaviglio; 7. Rosita Rota Gelpi; 11. Maria Grazia Roberti; 14. Matilde Ravizza	2. (Italy) ITA (silver)
Edition 13 (Czech Republic); 1997 Malé Svatonovice	6. Rosita Rota Gelpi; 8. Flavia Gaviglio; 10. Maria Grazia Roberti; 21. Mirela Cabodi	2. (Italy) ITA (silver)
Edition 14 (France); 1998 Dimitile La Reunion	2. Matilde Ravizza (silver); 5. Maria Grazia Roberti; 11. Rosita Rota Gelpi; 14. Pierangela Baronchelli	1. (Italy) ITA (gold)
Edition 15 (Malaysia); 1999 Mount Kinabalu Park	1. Rosita Rota Gelpi (gold); 4. Flavia Gaviglio; 5. Pierangela Baronchelli; 12. Maria Grazia Roberti	1. (Italy) ITA (gold)
Edition 16 (Germany); 2000 Bergen	5. Matilde Ravizza; 10. Pierangela Baronchelli; 12. Flavia Gaviglio; 25. Rosita Rota Gelpi	2. (Italy) ITA (silver)
Edition 17 (Italy); 2001 Arta Terme	10. Rosita Rota Gelpi; 12. Pierangela Baronchelli; 16. Flavia Gaviglio; 20. Daniela Spilotti	1. (Italy) ITA (gold)
Edition 18 (Austria); 2002 Innsbruck	2. Antonella Confortola (silver); 7. Pierangela Baronchelli; 13. Rosita Rota Gelpi; 16. Vittoria Salvini	1. (Italy) ITA (gold)
Edition 19 (United States); 2003 Girdwood (Alaska)	4. Antonella Confortola; 17. Angela Serena; 20. Vittoria Salvini; 29. Flavia Gaviglio	5. (Italy) ITA
Edition 20 (Italy); 2004 Sauze d`Oulx	1. Rosita Rota Gelpi (gold); 4. Antonella Confortola; 9. Flavia Gaviglio; 23. Matilde Ravizza	1. (Italy) ITA (gold)
Year	Rank and runner	Team
Edition 21 (New Zealand); 2005 Wellington	6. Vittoria Salvini; 9. Maria Grazia Roberti; 10. Pierangela Baronchelli; 25. Elisa Desco	1. (Italy) ITA (gold)
Edition 22 (Turkey); 2006 Bursa-Uludag	5. Vittoria Salvini; 12. Maria Grazia Roberti; 22. Monica Morstofolini; 35. Elisa Desco	3. (Italy) ITA (bronze)
Edition 23 (Switzerland); 2007 Ovronnaz	4. Elisa Desco; 11. Maria Grazia Roberti; 14. Monica Morstofolini; 16. Vittoria Salvini	3. (Italy) ITA (bronze)
Edition 24 (Switzerland); 2008 Crans-Montana	2. Renate Rungger (silver); 3. Elisa Desco (bronze); 28. Maria Grazia Roberti; 42. Vittoria Salvini	3. (Italy) ITA (bronze)
Edition 25 (Italy); 2009 Campodolcino	1. Valentina Belotti (gold); 2. Maria Grazia Roberti (silver); 21. Cristina Scolari; Elisa Desco (squalificata per doping)	2. (Italy) ITA (silver)
Edition 26 (Slovenia); 2010 Kamnik	2. Valentina Belotti (silver); 6. Antonella Confortola; 9. Maria Grazia Roberti; 30. Alice Gaggi	1. (Italy) ITA (gold)
Edition 27 (Albania); 2011 Tirana	7. Ornella Ferrara; 8. Antonella Confortola; 9. Alice Gaggi; 14. Valentina Belotti	1. (Italy) ITA (gold)
Edition 28 (Italy); 2012 Temu-Ponte di Legno	2. Valentina Belotti (silver); 13. Renate Rungger; 14. Alice Gaggi; 17. Antonella Confortola	2. (Italy) ITA (silver)
Edition 29 (Poland); 2013 Krynica-Zdroj	1. Alice Gaggi (gold); 3. Elisa Desco (bronze); 7. Antonella Confortola; 15. Samanta Galassi	1. (Italy) ITA (gold)
Edition 30 (Italy); 2014 Cassette di Massa	8. Alice Gaggi; 11. Elisa Desco; 13. Antonella Confortola; 53. Renate Rungger	3. (Italy) ITA (bronze)
Year	Rank and runner	Team
Edition 31 (United Kingdom); 2015 Betws-y-Coed	5. Alice Gaggi; 12. Samanta Galassi; 16. Ivana Iozzia; 17. Sara Bottarelli	4. (Italy) ITA
Edition 32 (Bulgaria); 2016 Sapareva-Banja	2. Valentina Belotti (silver); 7. Alice Gaggi; 8. Sara Bottarelli; 22. Antonella Confortola	1. (Italy) ITA (gold)
Edition 33 (Italy); 2017 Premana	7. Alice Gaggi; 11. Ivana Iozzia; 14. Sara Bottarelli; Roberta Ciappini (ritired)	2. (Italy) ITA (silver)

=== Medal table individual ===
Runner	Individual				Team				Total			
Runner	1st place, gold medalist(s)	2nd place, silver medalist(s)	3rd place, bronze medalist(s)	Tot	1st place, gold medalist(s)	2nd place, silver medalist(s)	3rd place, bronze medalist(s)	Tot	1st place, gold medalist(s)	2nd place, silver medalist(s)	3rd place, bronze medalist(s)	Tot
Rosita Rota Gelpi	2	0	0	2	4	4	0	8	6	4	0	10
Valentina Belotti	1	3	0	4	3	2	0	5	4	5	0	9
Alice Gaggi	1	0	0	1	4	2	1	6	5	2	1	7
Manuela Di Centa	0	1	1	2	1	0	1	2	1	1	2	4
Antonella Confortola	0	1	0	1	6	1	1	8	6	1	2	9
Chiara Saporetti	0	1	0	1	1	0	0	1	1	0	1	2
Maria Cocchetti	0	1	0	1	2	3	1	6	2	3	2	7
Maria Grazia Roberti	0	1	0	1	6	4	5	15	6	4	6	16
Matilde Ravizza	0	1	0	1	2	2	0	4	2	2	1	5
Elisa Desco	0	0	2	2	2	0	4	6	2	0	6	8
Giuliana Savaris	0	0	1	1	1	2	1	4	1	2	2	5
Guidina Dal Sasso	0	0	1	1	1	1	0	2	1	1	1	3
Nives Curti	0	0	1	1	1	1	1	3	1	1	2	4
Renate Rungger	0	1	0	1	1	1	2	4	1	1	3	5
Valentina Bottarelli	0	1	0	1	1	2	0	3	1	2	1	4

=== Medal table team ===
Team	Gold	Silver	Bronze	Total
(Italy) Italia	14	10	6	30

== See also ==
- Italy at the European Mountain Running Championships
