= 2006 World Mountain Running Trophy =

- Organisers: WMRA
- Edition: 22nd
- Dates: 10 September
- Host city: Uludağ, Turkey
- Level: Senior and Junior
- Events: 8

The 2006 World Mountain Running Championships was the 22nd edition of the global mountain running competition, World Mountain Running Championships, organised by the World Mountain Running Association.

== Results ==
=== Men Senior ===
Distance 12.0 km, difference in height 1275 m, participants 151.

Individual

Rank	Runner	Country	Time
1st place, gold medalist(s)	Rolando Ortiz	Colombia	56:16
2nd place, silver medalist(s)	Jonathan Wyatt	New Zealand	56:22
3rd place, bronze medalist(s)	Tesfay Felfele	Eritrea	56:39
4	Selahattin Selcuk	Turkey	57:11
5	Marco De Gasperi	Italy	58:20
6	Marco Gaiardo	Italy	58:35
7	Ahmet Arslan	Turkey	58:46
8	Maekele Tedese	Eritrea	58:54
9	Fkre Andebrhan	Eritrea	59:13
10	Simon Gutierrez	United States	59:21

Team

Rank	Team	Athletes	Points
1st place, gold medalist(s)	Eritrea	Tesfay Felfele, Maekele Tadese, Fkre Andebrhan, Mehari Ahferom, Berhe Asgedom	37
2nd place, silver medalist(s)	Italy	Marco De Gasperi, Marco Gaiardo, Gabriele Abate, Davide Chicco, Emanuele Manzi, Diego Filippi	44
3rd place, bronze medalist(s)	Turkey	Selahattin Selcuk, Ahmet Arslan, Munir Cura, Nihat Kaya, Sedat Yilmaz, Serdar Durer	62

=== Women Senior ===
Distance 8.4 km, difference in height 895 m, participants 84.

Individual

Rank	Runner	Country	Time
1st place, gold medalist(s)	Andrea Mayr	Austria	47:11
2nd place, silver medalist(s)	Martina Strähl	Switzerland	47:29
3rd place, bronze medalist(s)	Isabelle Guillot	France	47:43
4	Anita Evertsen-H.	Norway	48:47
5	Vittoria Salvini	Italy	49:19
6	Yolanda Fernández	Colombia	49:29
7	Anna Pichrotva	Czech Republic	49:37
8	Kirsten Melkevik	Norway	49:47
9	Nicole Hunt	United States	50:13
10	Rachael Dobbs	United States	50:24

Team

Rank	Team	Athletes	Points
1st place, gold medalist(s)	United States	Nicole Hunt, Rachael Dobbs, Christine Lundy, Lisa Goldsmith	35
2nd place, silver medalist(s)	Czech Republic	Anna Pichrtova, Irena Sadkova, Iva Milesova, Pavla Matyasova	37
3rd place, bronze medalist(s)	Italy	Vittoria Salvini, Maria Grazia Roberti, Monica Morstofolini, Elisa Desco	39

=== Junior Men ===
Distance 8.4 km, difference in height 895 m, participants 76.

Individual

Rank	Runner	Country	Time
1st place, gold medalist(s)	Ermias Mehrteab	Eritrea	41:20
2nd place, silver medalist(s)	Kiflom Sium	Eritrea	41:54
3rd place, bronze medalist(s)	Juan Carlos Carera	Mexico	43:13
4	Ercan Muslu	Turkey	43:38
5	Selmani Abis	Turkey	43:40
6	Debesay Tsiege	Eritrea	43:48
7	Mahmut Oruclu	Turkey	45:24
8	Andrei Sergeev	Russia	46:14
9	Maxime Fico	France	46:18
10	Alessandro Martino	Italy	46:23

Team

Rank	Team	Athletes	Points
1st place, gold medalist(s)	Eritrea	Ermias Mehrteab, Kiflom Sium, Debesay Tsiege	9
2nd place, silver medalist(s)	Turkey	Ercan Muslu, Selmani Abis, Mahmut Oruclu, Fatih Demirtas	16
3rd place, bronze medalist(s)	Italy	Alessandro Martino, Mattia Scimaglia, Nicolo Roppolo, Vincenzo Scuro	40

=== Junior Women ===
Distance 3.4 km, difference in height 395 m, participants 48.

Individual

Rank	Runner	Country	Time
1st place, gold medalist(s)	Katarina Beresova	Slovakia	21:08
2nd place, silver medalist(s)	Natalia Leontyeva	Russia	22:45
3rd place, bronze medalist(s)	Janna Vokueva	Russia	22:50
4	Alice Gaggi	Italy	23:07
5	Natalia Nemkina	Russia	23:31
6	Esra Gullu	Turkey	23:37
7	Barbara Suchankova	Slovakia	23:45
8	Nicole Rogal	New Zealand	24:02
9	Dilek Cimenkaya	Turkey	24:08
10	Anita Baierl	Austria	24:15

Team

Rank	Team	Athletes	Points
1st place, gold medalist(s)	Russia	Natalia Leontyeva, Janna Vokueva, Natalia Nemkina	5
2nd place, silver medalist(s)	Slovakia	Katarina Beresova, Barbara Suchankova	8
3rd place, bronze medalist(s)	Turkey	Esra Gullu, Dilek Cimenkaya, Hulya Ongun	15

== Medal table (junior events included) ==
Rank	Country	1st place, gold medalist(s)	2nd place, silver medalist(s)	3rd place, bronze medalist(s)	Tot.
1	Italy	3	1	0	4
2	New Zealand	2	1	1	4
3	Eritrea	1	1	0	2
3	France	1	1	0	2
5	Scotland	1	0	0	1
6	Austria	0	3	0	3
7	Germany	0	1	2	3
8	Poland	0	0	2	2
8	Switzerland	0	0	2	2
10	Czech Republic	0	0	1	1
