= 2007 World Mountain Running Trophy =

- Organisers: WMRA
- Edition: 23rd
- Dates: 15 September
- Host city: Ovronnaz, Switzerland
- Level: Senior and Junior
- Events: 8

The 2007 World Mountain Running Championships was the 23rd edition of the global mountain running competition, World Mountain Running Championships, organised by the World Mountain Running Association.

== Results ==
=== Men Senior ===
Distance 12.3 km, difference in height 780 m, participants 152.

Individual

Rank	Runner	Country	Time
1st place, gold medalist(s)	Marco De Gasperi	Italy	51:49
2nd place, silver medalist(s)	Yohannes Tesfay	Eritrea	52:19
3rd place, bronze medalist(s)	Ermias Tesfazghi	Eritrea	53:02
4	Joe Symonds	Scotland	53:02
5	Adam Grice	England	53:10
6	Marco Gaiardo	Italy	53:31
7	Alexis Gex-Fabry	Switzerland	53:38
8	Sebastien Epiney	Switzerland	53:40
9	Raymond Fontaine	France	54:23
10	Tewoldeberhan Kokob	Eritrea	54:27

Team

Rank	Team	Athletes	Points
1st place, gold medalist(s)	Italy	Marco De Gasperi, Marco Gaiardo, Gabriele Abate, Andrea Regazzoni, Marco Rinaldi, Davide Chicco	30
2nd place, silver medalist(s)	Eritrea	Yohannes Tesfay, Ermias Tesfazghi, Tewoldeberhan Kokob, Kessete Ghebrezghiabiher, Mohamed Edris Adem	30
3rd place, bronze medalist(s)	Switzerland	Alexis Gex-Fabry, Sabastien Epiney, David Schneider, Andy Sutz, Georges Volery, Andre Marti	61

=== Women Senior ===
Distance 8.3 km, difference in height 520 m, participants 87.

Individual

Rank	Runner	Country	Time
1st place, gold medalist(s)	Anna Pichrtova	Czech Republic	39:40
2nd place, silver medalist(s)	Andrea Mayr	Austria	41:42
3rd place, bronze medalist(s)	Laura Haefeli	United States	41:59
4	Elisa Desco	Italy	42:39
5	Maria Rodriguez	Colombia	42:47
6	Daneja Grandovec	Slovenia	42:56
7	Bernadette Meier	Switzerland	43:21
8	Christine Lundy	United States	43:38
9	Isabelle Guillot	France	43:46
10	Iva Milesova	Czech Republic	44:10

Team

Rank	Team	Athletes	Points
1st place, gold medalist(s)	United States	Laura Haefeli, Christine Lundy, Rachael Cuellar, Anita Ortiz	23
2nd place, silver medalist(s)	Czech Republic	Anna Pichrtova, Iva Milesova, Tatiana Metelkova, Pavla Havlova	24
3rd place, bronze medalist(s)	Italy	Elisa Desco, Maria Grazia Roberti, Monica Morstofolini, Vittoria Salvini	29

=== Junior Men ===
Distance 8.3 km, difference in height 520 m, participants 78.

Individual

Rank	Runner	Country	Time
1st place, gold medalist(s)	Geoffrey Kusuro	Uganda	34:27
2nd place, silver medalist(s)	Moussie Semere	Eritrea	34:32
3rd place, bronze medalist(s)	Ouqbit Tseggay	Eritrea	34:34
4	Michael Hiyabu	Eritrea	34:53
5	Hasan Pak	Turkey	35:44
6	Juan Carlos Carera	Mexico	36:27
7	Zer'emariam Tseggay	Eritrea	36:51
8	Matthew Bayley	Australia	37:00
9	Ercan Muslu	Turkey	37:11
10	Manuel Stoeckert	Germany	37:15

Team

Rank	Team	Athletes	Points
1st place, gold medalist(s)	Eritrea	Moussie Semere, Ouqbit Tseggay, Michael Hiyabu, Zer'emariam Tseggay	9
2nd place, silver medalist(s)	Turkey	Hasan Pak, Ercan Muslu, Erkan Kus, Mahmut Oruclu	25
3rd place, bronze medalist(s)	Italy	Alex Baldaccini, Andrea Tabacchi, Richard Tiraboschi, Valerio Bendotti	70

=== Junior Women ===
Distance 4.3 km, difference in height 260 m, participants 55.

Individual

Rank	Runner	Country	Time
1st place, gold medalist(s)	Lara Tamsett	Australia	20:48
2nd place, silver medalist(s)	Hulya Bastug	Turkey	20:01
3rd place, bronze medalist(s)	Veronica Wallington	Australia	21:06
4	Anna Lieb	United States	21:23
5	Ruth Croft	New Zealand	21:34
6	Mhairi Inglis	Scotland	21:36
7	Anna Anderson	England	21:45
8	Maria Dalzot	United States	21:48
9	Anita Baierl	Austria	21:58
10	Hannah Bateson	England	22:14

Team

Rank	Team	Athletes	Points
1st place, gold medalist(s)	Australia	Lara Tamsett, Veronica Wallington, Lauren Mc Killop	4
2nd place, silver medalist(s)	United States	Anna Lieb, Maria Dalzot, Kathryn Helmerick	12
3rd place, bronze medalist(s)	Turkey	Hulya Bastug, Fatma Bati, Fatma Bastug	13
