= WMRA World Cup =

Annual mountain running competition

Tournament information
- Sport: Mountain running
- Location: Varies
- Dates: May or June–Early October
- Established: 1999
- Format: Race series

Current champion
- Men: Patrick Kipngeno; Women: Joyce Njeru

The WMRA World Cup is an annual series of mountain running competitions organised by the World Mountain Running Association (WMRA) that runs from around May to October. Athletes are awarded points for each performance on the tour. Its predecessor was the Alpine Grand Prix, a 1997 formation including four European races in the Alps region. It formally became the WMRA Grand Prix in 1999 and subsequently expanded to six races in 2001. It reverted to four races in 2007 and from 2008 onwards began to vary between five and seven races. The competition took its current title World Cup in 2014.

== History ==
The series originally was held mid-year around July to August, fitting mostly between the European Mountain Running Championships (held in early July) and the World Mountain Running Championships (held in mid-September). From 2001 onwards, the expansion of the series meant the inclusion of the World Championships as a leg of the series (if held in Europe) and the Grand Prix Final event coming after the championships as a season-closer for mountain running. The races in the middle period of the series are usually held relatively close together to allow top level athletes from across the world to compete in many races without excessive travel. From 2006 onwards the International Association of Athletics Federations (IAAF) began sanctioning the meetings on the annual circuit.

The points scoring format is cumulative. Finishing positions in a WMRA Grand Prix race range from 100 points for first to 1 point for 30th. Additional points may be awarded for performances achieved at the World Championships, if that event is included in the tour that year, and the Grand Prix Final race. An athlete's four best performances across the series are totalled and the athlete with the highest overall score wins the series. The series has a men's division and a women's division, with both a men's and women's series winner being declared. Athletes must compete in at least two races in order to be considered in the final rankings.

Jonathan Wyatt of New Zealand is the most successful athlete of the series history, accumulating eight wins from 1999 to 2009. He is also the only male athlete to achieve a perfect score (winning all his races), having done so five times consecutively from 2002 to 2006. Angela Mudge of Great Britain and Poland's Izabela Zatorska are the joint most successful female runners across the series, each with three victories to their name. Zatorska became the first person to achieve a perfect score in the series in 2001. Anna Pichrtová (2006) and Andrea Mayr (2014) are the only other women to match that feat. Eritrean Azeria Teklay became the first winner from Africa in 2012, marking increased participation from outside the Western world.

The World Cup was cancelled in 2020. From 2022 World Cup Gold Label and Silver Label events are held.

== Editions ==
- ^{nb1} Held as the Alpine Grand Prix
- ^{PS} Perfect score achieved

Ed.	Year	Dates	Races	Men's winner	Points	Women's winner	Points
—	1997^{[nb1]}	–	4	Helmut Schmuck (AUT)	260	Janina Saxer-Juszko (SUI)	300
—	1998^{[nb1]}	–	4	Antonio Molinari (ITA)	?	Janina Saxer-Juszko (SUI)	?
1st	1999	11 July–3 October	4	Jonathan Wyatt (NZL)	280	Angela Mudge (GBR)	320
2nd	2000	11 June–20 August	4	Antonio Molinari (ITA)	340	Angela Mudge (GBR)	285
3rd	2001	17 June–6 October	6	Marco De Gasperi (ITA)	290	Izabela Zatorska (POL)	300^{[PS]}
4th	2002	26 May–6 October	6	Jonathan Wyatt (NZL)	300^{[PS]}	Angela Mudge (GBR)	290
5th	2003	11 June–5 October	6	Jonathan Wyatt (NZL)	400^{[PS]}	Antonella Confortola (ITA)	380
6th	2004	16 May–9 October	6	Jonathan Wyatt (NZL)	400^{[PS]}	Izabela Zatorska (POL)	340
7th	2005	8 May–8 October	6	Jonathan Wyatt (NZL)	300^{[PS]}	Izabela Zatorska (POL)	325
8th	2006	23 July–28 October	6	Jonathan Wyatt (NZL)	430^{[PS]}	Anna Pichrtová (CZE)	430^{[PS]}
8th	2007	10 June–6 October	4	Marco Gaiardo (ITA)	300	Anna Pichrtová (CZE)	308
9th	2008	1 May–4 October	7	Jonathan Wyatt (NZL)	394	Anna Frost (NZL)	315
10th	2009	21 May–3 October	7	Jonathan Wyatt (NZL)	352	Iva Milesova (CZE)	327
11th	2010	13 May–2 October	5	Ahmet Arslan (TUR)	386	Andrea Mayr (AUT)	340
12th	2011	22 May–1 October	6	Ahmet Arslan (TUR)	407	Lucija Krkoč (SLO)	405
13th	2012	17 May–6 October	5	Azeria Teklay (ERI)	404	Valentina Belotti (ITA)	357
14th	2013	2 June–5 October	6	Azeria Teklay (ERI)	377	Mateja Kosovelj (SLO)	375
15th	2014	8 June–4 October	6	Petro Mamu (ERI)	386	Andrea Mayr (AUT)	440^{[PS]}
16th	2015	7 June–3 October	6	Andrew Douglas (GBR)	275	Sarah Tunstall (GBR)	375
17th	2016	12 June–1 October	6	Petro Mamu (ERI)	450	Andrea Mayr (AUT)	425
18th	2017	28 May–7 October	7	Alex Baldaccini (ITA)	440	Alice Gaggi (ITA)	470
19th	2018	15 July–6 October	5	Geoffrey Gikuni Ndungu (KEN)	410	Andrea Mayr (AUT)	435
20th	2019	24 May–12 October	7	Andrew Douglas (GBR)	525	Sarah McCormack (IRL)	495
21st	2020	Cancelled	0	{none}	0	{none}	0

== Races ==
Numerous races have featured over the history of the competition, most of them being held in the Alps. Exceptions to this include the Gibraltar Rock Race in Gibraltar, the Snowdon Race in Wales, Skaala Uphill in Norway, and Alyeska Mountain Run in Alaska. The Šmarna Gora Mountain Race in Slovenia has served the honour of being the Grand Prix Final race on several occasions.

== 2024 World Cup Participating Races ==
Race	Location	Country	Dates
Broken Arrow Skyrace	Tahoe, California	USA	20-23 June 2024
Grossglockner Mountain Run	Heiligenblut	Austria	7 July 2024
Montemuro Vertical	Parada de Ester	Portugal	14 July 2024
Montee du Nid d'Aigle	Saint-Gervais	France	20 July 2024
Giir di Mont	Premana	Italy	28 July 2024
Sierre Zinal	Sierre	Switzerland	10 August 2024
Trofeo Nasego	Nasego	Italy	31 August-1 September 2024
Smarna Gora	Ljubljana	Slovenia	6 October 2024
Val Bregaglia	Chiavenna	Italy	12-13 October 2024

== Notable Races ==
Race	Location	Country	Inclusion
World Mountain Running Championships	Varies	Varies	When held in Europe (post-2001)
La Montée du Grand Ballon	Willer-sur-Thur	France	Frequent
Gorski tek na Grintovec^{[nb2]}	Kamnik	Slovenia	Frequent
Mayrhofen Harakiri Run	Mayrhofen	Austria	Frequent
Šmarna Gora Mountain Race	Ljubljana	Slovenia	Frequent
Feuerkogel Berglauf	Ebensee	Austria	Occasional
Skaala Uphill	Loen	Norway	Occasional
Asitzgipfel Mountain Race	Leogang	Austria	Occasional
Castle Mountain Running	Arco	Italy	Occasional
Challenge Stellina	Susa	Italy	Occasional
Schlickeralm Berglauf	Telfes	Austria	Occasional
Grossglockner Berglauf	Heiligenblut	Austria	Infrequent
Gibraltar Rock Race	Rock of Gibraltar	Gibraltar	Infrequent
Berglauf Terlan	Mölten	Italy	Infrequent
Montagne Olimpiche	Sauze d'Oulx	Italy	Infrequent
Brandenkopf-Berglauf	Zell am Harmersbach	Germany	Infrequent
Borno Berglauf	Borno	Italy	Infrequent
Matterhornlauf	Zermatt	Switzerland	Infrequent
Hochfellnberglauf	Bergen	Germany	Infrequent
Gamperney-Berglauf	Grabs	Switzerland	Infrequent
Berglauf Seegrube	Innsbruck	Austria	Infrequent
Snowdon Race	Llanberis	United Kingdom	Infrequent
Kitzbüheler Hornlauf	Kitzbühel	Austria	Infrequent
Tek na smučeh Krvavec	Cerklje	Switzerland	Infrequent
Danis-Berglauf/Rothorn-Run	Lenzerheide	Switzerland	Infrequent
Tek na Ratitovec	Železniki	Slovenia	2015
Muttersberglauf	Bludenz	Austria	2014
Course des 2 Bains	Ovronnaz	Switzerland	2008
Berglauf Meran	Merano	Italy	2008
Raiffeisen Schneeberglauf	Puchberg am Schneeberg	Austria	2008
Crans-Montana Mountain Race	Chermignon	Switzerland	2007
Alyeska Mountain Run	Girdwood	United States	2002

- ^{nb2} Translates as Grintovec Mountain Race
