= 2009 European Mountain Running Championships =

- Organisers: EAA
- Edition: 8th
- Date: 12 July
- Host city: Telfes im Stubai, Austria
- Events: 4
- Distances: 11 km – Men; 9.5 km – Women; 9.5 km – U20 men 4 km – U20 women
- Participation: 241 athletes from 25 nations

The 2009 European Mountain Running Championships were held on 12 July in Telfes im Stubai, Austria. They were that year's area championships for mountain running, held by the European Athletic Association. The 2009 edition saw the introduction of two under-20s competitions into the championships programme, complementing the usual men's and women's senior races. The men's race was 11 km long and featured a total climb of 1300 m in altitude, while the women's and under-20s men's competitions were over 9.5 km and scaled a height of 950 m. The women's junior competition was held over 4 km with a total climb of 400 m.

Turkish runner Ahmet Arslan retained his European title for a second time in the men's senior race, following wins in 2007 and 2008. In the women's senior race, Martina Strähl took the honours over home favourite Andrea Mayr. Italian athletes dominated the team competitions at the championships, taking the gold medals in the senior men's and women's races, as well as the men's under-20s event. Turkish runners topped the podium in both the under-20s contests; Yusuf Alici and Derya Altintas won the boys and girls titles respectively.

== Results ==
=== Men ===
Rank	Runner	Country	Time (m:s)
Gold medal	Ahmet Arslan	Turkey	58:26
Silver medal	Marco De Gasperi	Italy	59:09
Bronze medal	Sébastien Epiney	Switzerland	59:19
4	Timo Zeiler	Germany	59:31
5	Raymond Fontaine	France	59:37
6	Martin Dematteis	Italy	60:04
7	Said Jandari	France	60:29
8	Emmanuel Meyssat	France	60:58
9	Riccardo Sterni	Italy	61:05
10	Javier Crespo	Spain	61:09

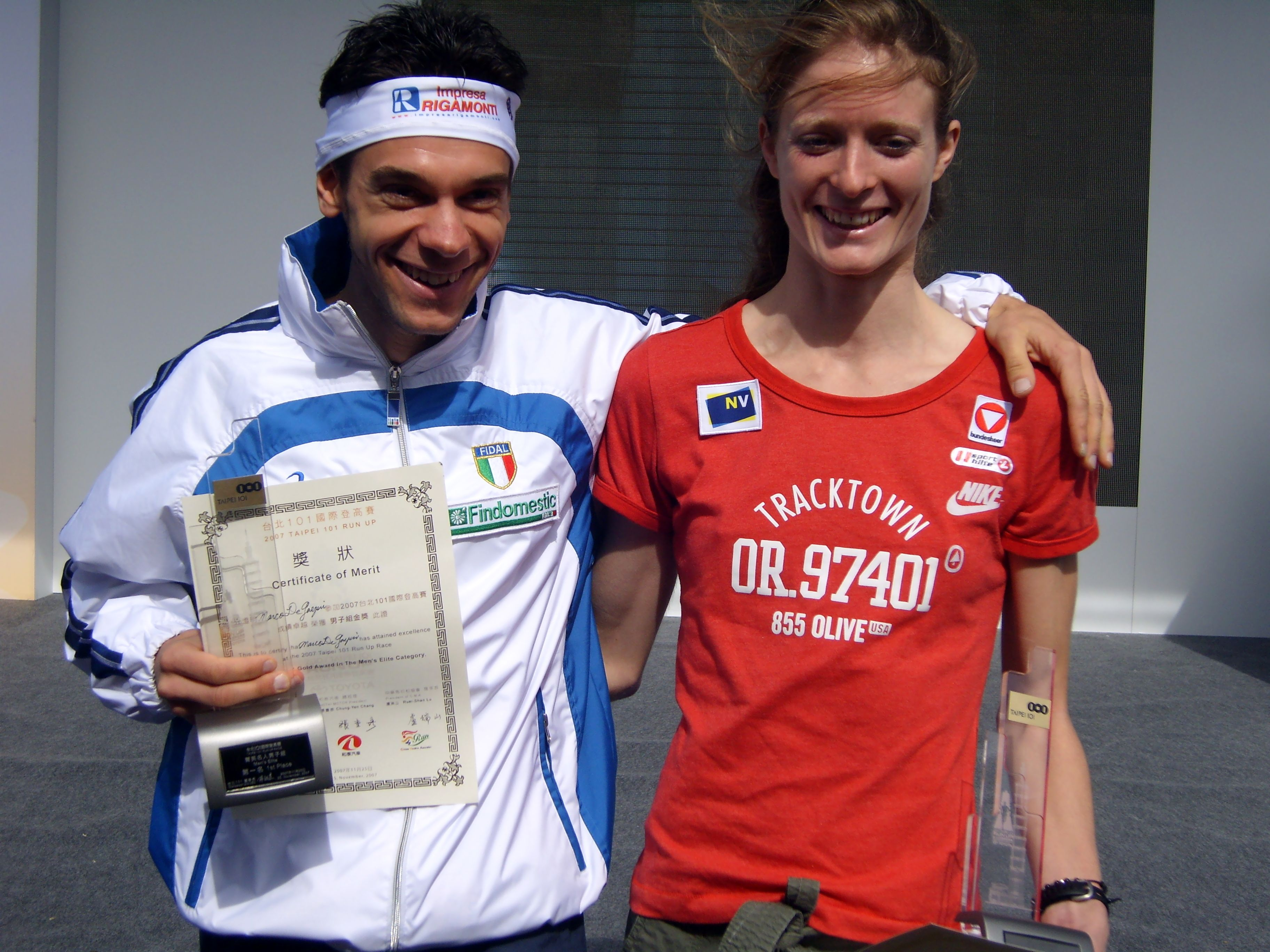
Marco De Gasperi (left) won the men's silver and Andrea Mayr took the women's bronze.

Teams
Rank	Team	Points
Gold medal	Italy	17
Silver medal	France	20
Bronze medal	Turkey	32
4	Switzerland	45
5	Czech Republic	48

- Total participants: 80 runners and 19 teams.

=== Women ===
Rank	Runner	Country	Time (m:s)
Gold medal	Martina Strähl	Switzerland	54:39
Silver medal	Valentina Belotti	Italy	55:28
Bronze medal	Andrea Mayr	Austria	56:55
4	Renate Rungger	Italy	57:17
5	Natalya Leontyeva	Russia	57:29
6	Bernadette Meier-Brändle	Switzerland	57:36
7	Zhanna Vokuyeva	Russia	58:01
8	Kate Goodhead	United Kingdom	58:34
9	Katie Ingram	United Kingdom	58:37
10	Maria Grazia Roberti	Italy	58:40

Teams
Rank	Team	Points
Gold medal	Italy; Valentina Belotti; Renate Rungger; Maria Grazia Roberti	16
Silver medal	Switzerland	19
Bronze medal	United Kingdom	34
4	Russia	54
5	Czech Republic	57

- Total participants: 64 runners and 16 teams.

=== Under-20s men ===
Rank	Runner	Country	Time (m:s)
Gold medal	Yusuf Alici	Turkey	50:29
Silver medal	Xavier Chevrier	Italy	50:44
Bronze medal	Candide Pralong	Switzerland	51:39
4	Jakub Bajza	Czech Republic	52:58
5	Scott McDonald	United Kingdom	53:06
6	Didrik Tønseth	Norway	53:13
7	Michael Gras	France	53:28
8	Luca Cagnati	Italy	53:37
9	Jørgen Bye Brevik	Norway	53:51
10	Kelemu Crippa	Italy	53:54

Teams
Rank	Team	Points
Gold medal	Italy	20
Silver medal	Norway	26
Bronze medal	United Kingdom	32
4	Switzerland	39
5	Turkey	58

- Total participants: 59 runners and 14 teams.

=== Under-20s women ===
Rank	Runner	Country	Time (m:s)
Gold medal	Derya Altintas	Turkey	23:15
Silver medal	Elif Karabulut	Turkey	23:20
Bronze medal	Yasemin Can	Turkey	23:29
4	Andra Ologu	Romania	23:39
5	Tatyana Prorokova	Russia	23:43
6	Gina Paletta	United Kingdom	23:45
7	Ludmila Horká	Czech Republic	23:51
8	Raluca Morjan	Romania	23:59
9	Victoria Graves	United Kingdom	24:03
10	Kaja Obidic	Slovenia	24:15

Teams
Rank	Team	Points
Gold medal	Turkey	3
Silver medal	Romania	12
Bronze medal	United Kingdom	15
4	Czech Republic	18
5	Russia	26

- Total participants: 38 runners and 14 teams.
- NB: The women's under-20s team competition was decided by the performances of each country's top two performers.
