= 1995 World Mountain Running Trophy =

1995 World Mountain Running Championships
- Organisers: WMRA
- Edition: 11th
- Date: 10 September
- Host city: Edinburgh, Scotland
- Events: 6

The 1995 World Mountain Running Championships was the 11th edition of the global mountain running competition, World Mountain Running Championships, organised by the World Mountain Running Association and was held in Edinburgh, Scotland on 10 September 1995.

== Results ==
=== Men ===
Distance 12.2 km, difference in height 820 m, participants 104.

Rank	Athlete	Country	Time
1st place, gold medalist(s)	Lucio Fregona	Italy	51:17
2nd place, silver medalist(s)	Tommy Murray	Scotland	51:46
3rd place, bronze medalist(s)	Marco Toini	Italy	52:01
4	Antonio Molinari	Italy	52:55
5	Andrea Agostini	Italy	52:57
6	Roberto Barbi	Italy	53:04
7	Robert Quinn	Scotland	53:20
8	Vaclav Ozana	Czech Republic	53:59
9	German Fernandez	Colombia	54:03
10	John Taylor	England	54:06

=== Men team ===
Rank	Country	Athletes	Points
1st place, gold medalist(s)	Italy	Lucio Fregona, Marco Toini, Antonio Molinari, Andrea Agostini, Roberto Barbi, Gino Caneva	13
2nd place, silver medalist(s)	Scotland	Tommy Murray, Robert Quinn, Colin Donnelly, Graeme Bartlett, Peter Dymoke, John Hepburn	47
3rd place, bronze medalist(s)	England	John Taylor, Craig Roberts, Mark Kinch, Greg Hull, Keith Anderson	62

=== Men junior ===
Distance 7.85 km, difference in height 450 m, participants 46.

Rank	Athlete	Country	Time
1st place, gold medalist(s)	Maurizio Bonetti	Italy	33:21
2nd place, silver medalist(s)	Mathew Moorehouse	England	33:42
3rd place, bronze medalist(s)	Martin Brusak	Czech Republic	33:47
4	Emanuele Manzi	Italy	34:03
5	Marco Denigris	Italy	34:13
6	Miloslav Suchy	Czech Republic	34:16
7	Marco De Gasperi	Italy	34:32
8	Lubomir Dryjak	Czech Republic	34:34
9	Tim Davies	Wales	34:38
10	Alix Tavriac	France	34:38

=== Men junior team ===
Rank	Country	Athletes	Points
1st place, gold medalist(s)	Italy	Maurizio Bonetti, Emanuele Manzi, Marco Denigris, Marco De Gasperi	10
2nd place, silver medalist(s)	Czech Republic	Martin Brusak, Miloslav Suchy, Lubomir Dryjak, Ludek Sir	17
3rd place, bronze medalist(s)	France	Alix Tavriac, Cyril Merle, Cedric Bailly, Eric Tournier	41

=== Women ===
Distance 7.85 km, difference in height 450 m, participants 70.

Rank	Athlete	Country	Time
1st place, gold medalist(s)	Gudrun Pflüger	Austria	37:00
2nd place, silver medalist(s)	Isabelle Guillot	France	37:32
3rd place, bronze medalist(s)	Nives Curti	Italy	37:43
4	Catherine Lallemand	Belgium	38:14
5	Stephanie Manel	France	38:25
6	Sarah Young	England	39:12
7	Isabella Moretti	Switzerland	39:27
8	Mirella Cabodi	Italy	39:31
9	Maria Grazia Roberti	Italy	39:49
10	Evelyne Mura H.	France	40:02

=== Women team ===
Rank	Country	Athletes	Points
1st place, gold medalist(s)	France	Isabelle Guillot, Stephanie Manel, H. Evelyne Mura, Odile Leveque	17
2nd place, silver medalist(s)	Italy	Nives Curti, Mirella Cabodi, Maria Grazia Roberti, Valeria Colpo	20
3rd place, bronze medalist(s)	England	Sarah Young, Sarah Rowell, Ann Buckley, Lucy Wrihgt	41
