= Maria Grazia Roberti =

Italian mountain runner and snowshoe runner

Personal information
- Full name: Maria Grazia Cathelijne Roberti
- Nationality: Italian
- Born: 10 December 1966 (age 59) Puegnago del Garda

Sport
- Country: Italy (26 caps)
- Sport: Athletics; Snowshoe running Mountain running Skyrunning
- Club: Attletica Gavardo; G.S. Forestale

Achievements and titles
- Personal best: Marathon: 2:41:46 (195)
Medal record
Mountain running
Event	1st	2nd	3rd
World Championships Individual	0	1	0
World Championships Team	6	4	5
European Championships Individual	0	1	0
European Championships Team	6	1	2
Total	12	7	7
World Championships
Silver medal – second place	2009 Campodolcino	Individual
European Championships
Silver medal – second place	1996 Llanberis	Individual
Snowshoe running
World Championships
Gold medal – first place	2006 Schladming	Overall
Gold medal – first place	2010 Vancouver	Overall
Gold medal – first place	2012 Quebec City	Overall
Bronze medal – third place	2013 Fondo	Overall

Maria Grazia Roberti (born 10 December 1966) is an Italian female mountain runner and snowshoe runner, who won three World Snowshoe Championships.

== Biography ==
Maria Grazia Roberti won several mountain running medals at the world and European championships throughout her career, including two individual silver medals. At 40 years old, she took up snowshoe running and won three gold and one bronze medals at the world championships.

== Achievements ==
In mountain running she has participated in 16 World Championships (from 1989 to 2010) and 10 of the European Championships (1996 to 2012), winning 26 medals of which 2 at the individual level and 24 with the national team.

Year	Competition	Venue	Position	Event	Time	Notes
Mountain running (Individual)
1989	World Championships	(France) Chatillon-en-Diois	16th	7.7 km/460 m	42:06	
1991	World Championships	(Switzerland) Zermatt	13th	8.3 km/570 m	46:49	
1992	World Championships	(Italy) Susa Valley	11th	7.44 km/625 m	43:31	
1993	World Championships	(France) Gap	5th	7.94 km/395 m	38:28	
1994	World Championships	(Germany) Berchtesgaden	14th	7.34 km/695 m	43:22	
1995	World Championships	(United Kingdom) Edinburgh	9th	7.85 km/450 m	39:49	
1996	European Championships	(United Kingdom) Llanberis	2nd	Women's race	53:22	
1996	World Championships	(Austria) Telfes	11th	7.25 km/785 m	44:06	
1997	European Championships	(Austria) Ebensee	12th	Women's race	52:40	
1997	World Championships	(Czech Republic) Malé Svatoňovice	10th	7.8 km/600 m	43:24	
1998	European Championships	(Italy) Sestriere	4th	Women's race	36:22	
1998	World Championships	(France) Dimitile	5th	8.27 km/750 m	48:12	
1999	European Championships	(Austria) Bad Kleinkirchheim	8th	Women's race	59:02	
1999	World Championships	(Malaysia) Kota Kinabalu	12th	7.8 km/510 m	41:38	
2005	World Championships	(New Zealand) Wellington	9th	9.1 km/620 m	43:46	
2006	European Championships	(Czech Republic) Malé Svatoňovice	7th	Women's race	42:42	
2006	World Championships	(Turkey) Bursa	12th	8.4 km/895 m	50:49	
2007	European Championships	(France) Cauterets	10th	Women's race	56:05	
2007	World Championships	(Switzerland) Ovronnaz	11th	8.3 km/520 m	42:39	
2008	European Championships	(Germany) Zell am Harmersbach	8th	Women's race	41:54	
2008	World Championships	(Switzerland) Crans Montana	28th	8.3 km/690 m	49:21	
2009	European Championships	(Austria) Telfes	10th	Women's race	58:40	
2009	World Championships	(Italy) Campodolcino	2nd	8.6 km/550 m	44:03	
2010	European Championships	(Bulgaria) Sapareva Banya	11th	Women's race	41:18	
2010	World Championships	(Slovenia) Kamnik	9th	8.5 km/960 m	52:42	
2012	European Championships	(Turkey) Pamukkale	18th	8.3 km/470 m	41:18	

=== Team results ===
- World Mountain Running Championships (15 medals)
  - (gold) 1989, 1993, 1998, 1999, 2005, 2010 (6)
  - (silver) 1995, 1996, 1997, 2009 (4)
  - (bronze) 1991, 1994, 2006, 2007, 2008 (5)
  - 4th: 1992
- European Mountain Running Championships (9 medals)
  - (gold) 1996, 1998, 2006, 2007, 2009, 2010 (6)
  - (silver) 2012 (1)
  - (bronze) 1999, 2008 (2)
  - 5th: 1997

== National titles ==
- Italian Mountain Running Championships
  - Mountain running: 1997, 2006 (2)
- Italian Long Distance Mountain Running Championships
  - Long-distance mountain running: 2008, 2010, 2012 (3)

== See also ==
- Italy at the European Mountain Running Championships
- Italy at the World Mountain Running Championships
