= 2004 World Mountain Running Trophy =

- Organisers: WMRA
- Edition: 20th
- Dates: 5 September
- Host city: Sauze d'Oulx, Italy
- Level: Senior and Junior
- Events: 8

The 2004 World Mountain Running Championships was the 20th edition of the global mountain running competition, World Mountain Running Championships, organised by the World Mountain Running Association.

== Results ==
=== Men Senior ===
Distance 10.14 km, difference in height 1017 m, participants 157.

Individual

Rank	Runner	Country	Time
1st place, gold medalist(s)	Jonathan Wyatt	New Zealand	48:47
2nd place, silver medalist(s)	Yohannes Tesfay	Eritrea	50:04
3rd place, bronze medalist(s)	Raymond Fontaine	France	50:26
4	Helmut Schiessl	Germany	50:50
5	Billy Burns	England	51:19
6	Marco Gaiardo	Italy	51:27
7	Merid Teklemariam	Eritrea	51:31
8	John Brown	England	51:39
9	Marco De Gasperi	Italy	51:42
10	Ricardo Mejía	Mexico	51:48

Team

Rank	Team	Points
1st place, gold medalist(s)	Italy	24
2nd place, silver medalist(s)	England	48
3rd place, bronze medalist(s)	Germany	67

=== Women Senior ===
Distance 8.46 km, difference in height 862 m, participants 82.

Individual

Rank	Runner	Country	Time
1st place, gold medalist(s)	Rosita Rota Gelpi	Italy	50:27
2nd place, silver medalist(s)	Anna Pichrtova	Czech Republic	50:37
3rd place, bronze medalist(s)	Andrea Mayr	Austria	50:52
4	Antonella Confortola	Italy	51:04
5	Tracey Brindley	Scotland	51:16
6	Svetlana Demidenko	Russia	51:43
7	Izabela Zatorska	Poland	51:57
8	Shireen Crumpton	New Zealand	51:59
9	Flavia Gaviglio	Italy	52:18
10	Petra Summer	Austria	52:51

Team

Rank	Team	Points
1st place, gold medalist(s)	Italy	14
2nd place, silver medalist(s)	Austria	49
3rd place, bronze medalist(s)	United States	50

=== Junior Men ===
Distance 8.46 km, difference in height 862 m, participants 77.

Individual

Rank	Runner	Country	Time
1st place, gold medalist(s)	Mohamed Haben	Eritrea	45:16
2nd place, silver medalist(s)	Kiflom Weldemichael	Eritrea	45:42
3rd place, bronze medalist(s)	Juan Carlos Carera	Mexico	46:07
4	Biniam Tewelde	Eritrea	46:21
5	Bernard Dematteis	Italy	46:54
6	Iain Donnan	Scotland	47:03
7	Martin Urbanovsky	Slovakia	47:24
8	Nihat Kaya	Turkey	47:35
9	Sedat Gonen	Turkey	48:14
10	Andrew Ellis	England	48:17

Team

Rank	Team	Athletes	Points
1st place, gold medalist(s)	Eritrea	Mohamed Haben, Kiflom Weldemichael, Biniam Tewelde, Kidane Gebreselasi	7
2nd place, silver medalist(s)	Turkey	Nihat Kaya, Sedat Gonen, Mugdat Ozturk	29
3rd place, bronze medalist(s)	Italy	Bernard Dematteis, Mattia Roppolo, Martin Dematteis, Ruggero Ghezzi	30

=== Junior Women ===
Distance 3.57 km, difference in height 447 m, participants 38.

Individual

Rank	Runner	Country	Time
1st place, gold medalist(s)	Yulia Mochalova	Russia	26:40
2nd place, silver medalist(s)	Lucija Krkoc	Slovenia	28:11
3rd place, bronze medalist(s)	Mateja Kosovelj	Slovenia	29:48
4	Dominika Wisniewska	Poland	29:54
5	Serena Pollazzon	Italy	30:14
6	Tatiana Makarova	Russia	30:14
7	Fatma Bati	Turkey	30:27
8	Sarah Tunstall	England	30:45
9	Natalia Nemkina	Russia	30:56
10	Ana Markovic	Serbia and Montenegro	31:05

Team

Rank	Team	Athletes	Points
1st place, gold medalist(s)	Slovenia	Lucija Krkoc, Mateja Kosovelj, Suza Mladenovic	5
2nd place, silver medalist(s)	Russia	Yulia Mochalova, Tatiana Makarova, Natalia Nemkina	7
3rd place, bronze medalist(s)	Poland	Dominika Wisniewska, Dagmara Handzlik, Iwona Bota	17

== Medal table (junior events included) ==
Rank	Country	1st place, gold medalist(s)	2nd place, silver medalist(s)	3rd place, bronze medalist(s)	Tot.
1	Italy	3	1	0	4
2	New Zealand	2	1	1	4
3	Eritrea	1	1	0	2
3	France	1	1	0	2
5	Scotland	1	0	0	1
6	Austria	0	3	0	3
7	Germany	0	1	2	3
8	Poland	0	0	2	2
8	Switzerland	0	0	2	2
10	Czech Republic	0	0	1	1
