= 1998 World Mountain Running Trophy =

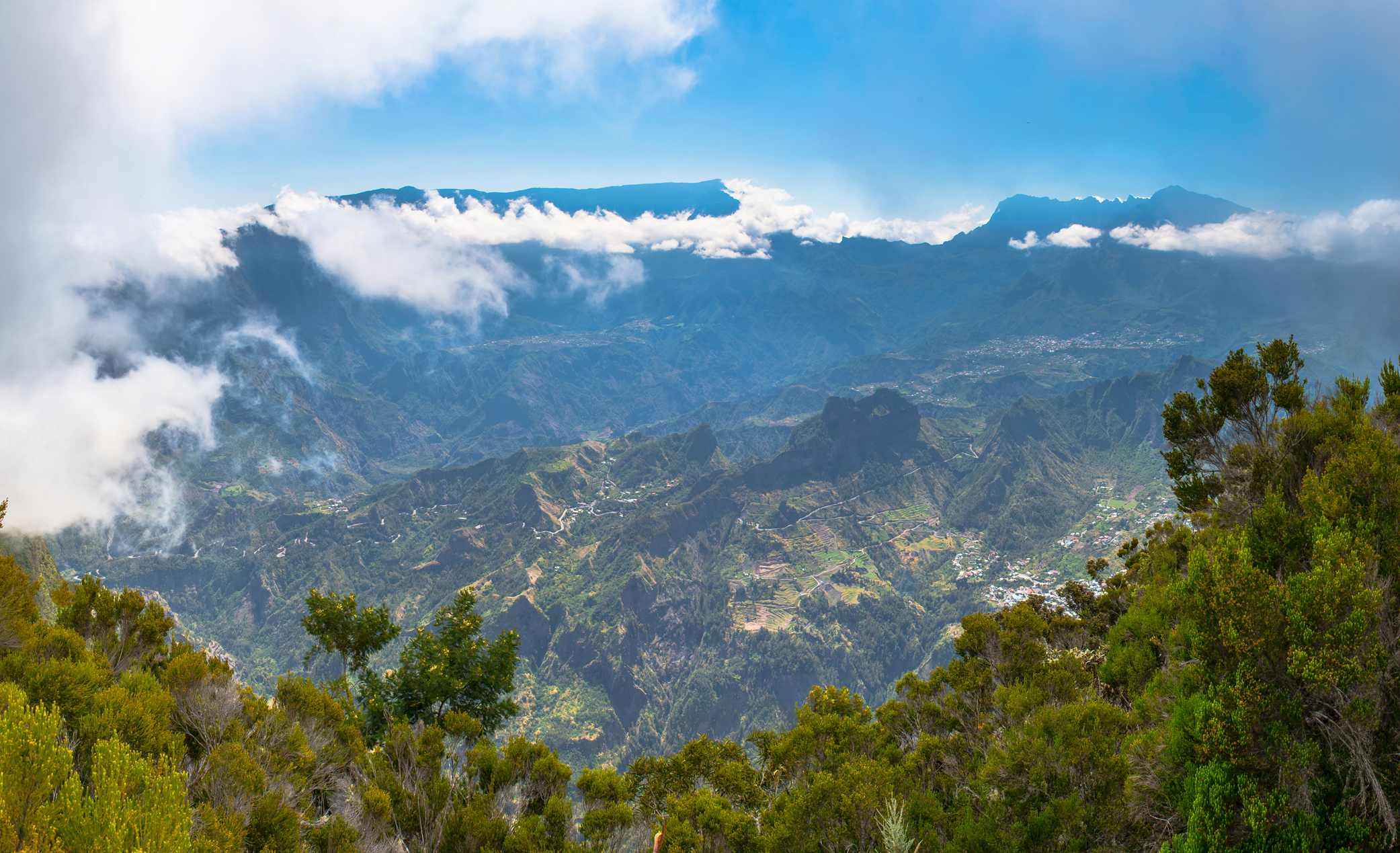
- Dimitile landscape.
- Organisers: WMRA
- Edition: 14th
- Dates: 20 September
- Host city: Dimitile, France
- Level: Senior and Junior
- Events: 8

The 1998 World Mountain Running Championships was the 14th edition of the global mountain running competition, World Mountain Running Championships, organised by the World Mountain Running Association.

== Results ==
=== Individual ===
==== Men individual ====
Distance 15.16 km, difference in height 1520 m, participants 124.

Rank	Athlete	Country	Time
1st place, gold medalist(s)	Jonathan Wyatt	New Zealand	1:25:19
2nd place, silver medalist(s)	Antonio Molinari	Italy	1:26:47
3rd place, bronze medalist(s)	Guido Dold	Germany	1:28:26
4	Robert Quinn	Scotland	1:28:44
5	Stephane Maheo	France	1:28:48
6	Helmut Schmuck	Austria	1:28:58
7	Davide Milesi	Italy	1:29:16
8	Richard Findlow	England	1:29:32
9	Eckart Wagner	Germany	1:29:43
10	Iouri Oussatchev	Russia	1:30:07

==== Women individual ====
Distance 8.27 km, difference in height 750 m, participants 69.

Rank	Athlete	Country	Time
1st place, gold medalist(s)	Dita Hebelkova	Czech Republic	46:00
2nd place, silver medalist(s)	Matilde Ravizza	Italy	46:59
3rd place, bronze medalist(s)	Melissa Moon	New Zealand	47:43
4	Maree Bunce	New Zealand	47:59
5	Maria Grazia Roberti	Italy	48:12
6	Izabela Zatorska	Poland	48:13
7	Jaroslava Bukvajova	Slovakia	48:16
8	Ludmila Melicherova	Slovakia	48:24
9	Heater Heasman	England	48:32
10	Carol Greenwood	England	48:52

==== Junior Men individual ====
Participants 49.

Rank	Athlete	Country	Time
1st place, gold medalist(s)	Raymond Fontaine	France	42:00
2nd place, silver medalist(s)	Adam Crossland	England	42:25
3rd place, bronze medalist(s)	Petr Losman	Czech Republic	43:00
4	Roberto Del Soglio	Italy	44:14
5	Gabriele Abate	Italy	44:53
6	Matthew Collins	Wales	45:11
7	Matteo Bagiotti	Italy	45:22
8	Marcin Tarchala	Poland	45:30
9	Tomasz Klisz	Poland	45:51
10	Joze Mehle	Slovenia	45:59

==== Junior Women individual ====
Participants 30.

Rank	Athlete	Country	Time
1st place, gold medalist(s)	Cornelia Heinzle	Austria	26:21
2nd place, silver medalist(s)	Ines Hizar	Slovenia	27:05
3rd place, bronze medalist(s)	Anna Pastrnakova	Slovakia	27:23
4	Lucie Navratilova	Czech Republic	27:44
5	Charlotte Sandersen	England	27:53
6	Tina Hizar	Slovenia	28:07
7	Laura Grossman	Scotland	28:32
8	Alexandra Bott	Germany	28:49
9	Asha Tonolini	Italy	29:10
10	Valentina Belotti	Italy	29:01

=== Team ===
==== Men ====
Rank	Country	Points
Gold medal	Italy; Antonio Molinari; Davide Milesi; Massimo Galliano; Lucio Fregona; Marco De Gasperi	41 pts
Silver medal	France; Stephane Maheo; Regis Roux; Sylvain Richard; Thierry Icart; Nicolas Pasquion; Jean Paul Payet	63 pts
Bronze medal	Austria; Helmut Schmuck; Rudolf Reitberger; Sepp Tschurtschentaler; Peter Schatz; Hubert Resch	69 pts

==== Women ====
Rank	Country	Points
Gold medal	Italy; Matilde Ravizza; Maria Grazia Roberti; Rosita Rota Gelpi; Pierangela Baronchelli	18 pts
Silver medal	New Zealand; Melissa Moon; Maree Bunce; Karen Murphy; Shirren Crompton	25 pts
Bronze medal	Slovakia; Jaroslava Bukvajova; Ludmila Melicherova; Alena Briedova	46 pts

==== Junior Men ====
Rank	Country	Points
Gold medal	Italy; Roberto Del Soglio; Gabriele Abate; Matteo Bagiotti; Gianluca Pelusi	16 pts
Silver medal	France; Raymond Fontaine; Edouard Burrier; Georges Burrier; Patrik Godin	25 pts
Bronze medal	Czech Republic; Petr Losman; Pavel Dobsicek; Lukas Razym; Daniel Sir	36 pts

==== Junior Women ====
Rank	Country	Points
Gold medal	Slovenia; Ines Hizar; Tina Hizar	8 pts
Silver medal	Austria; Cornelia Heinzle; Maria Koch; Ingeborg Pfluegel	15 pts
Bronze medal	England; Charlotte Sandersen; Kate Bailey; Rhiannon Matthews	18 pts
