= 1991 World Mountain Running Trophy =

1991 World Mountain Running Championships
- Organisers: WMRA
- Edition: 7th
- Date: 8 September
- Host city: Zermatt, Switzerland
- Events: 4

The 1991 World Mountain Running Championships was the 7th edition of the global mountain running competition, World Mountain Running Championships, organised by the World Mountain Running Association and was held in Zermatt, Switzerland on 8 September 1991.

== Results ==
=== Men ===
Distance 17.3 km, difference in height 1500 m, participants 88.

Rank	Athlete	Country	Time
1st place, gold medalist(s)	Jairo Correa	Colombia	1:24:28
2nd place, silver medalist(s)	Jean Paul Payet	France	1:26:20
3rd place, bronze medalist(s)	Francisco Sánchez	Colombia	1:27:08
4	Helmut Schmuck	Austria	1:28:24
5	Costantino Bertolla	Italy	1:28:34
6	Davide Milesi	Italy	1:28:52
7	Peter Schatz	Austria	1:28:54
8	Christian Aebersold	Switzerland	1:28:55
9	Marco Toini	Italy	1:29:02
10	Peter Gschwend	Switzerland	1:29:08

=== Men team ===
Rank	Country	Athletes	Points
1st place, gold medalist(s)	Italy	Constantino Bertolla, Davide Milesi, Marco Toini, Bortolo Saio	20
2nd place, silver medalist(s)	Austria	Helmut Schmuck, Peter Schatz, Florian Stern, Karl Zisser	22
3rd place, bronze medalist(s)	Colombia	Jairo Correa, Francisco Sanchez, Jose Riveros, Fabio Vilafrade	25

=== Men short distance ===
Distance 11.3 km, difference in height 805 m, participants 59.

Rank	Athlete	Country	Time
1st place, gold medalist(s)	John Lenihan	Ireland	54:12
2nd place, silver medalist(s)	Marius Hasler	Switzerland	54:45
3rd place, bronze medalist(s)	Woody Schoch	Switzerland	55:02
4	Robin Bryson	Ireland	55:07
5	Renatus Birrer	Switzerland	55:11
6	Fabio Ciaponi	Italy	55:17
7	Andrea Agostini	Italy	55:25
8	Paolo Agostini	Italy	55:39
9	Dieter Ranftl	Germany	55:50
10	Thierry Icart	France	55:59

=== Men short distance team ===
Rank	Country	Athletes	Points
1st place, gold medalist(s)	Switzerland	Marius Hasler, Woody Schoch, Renatus Birrer, Guido Beilmann	10
2nd place, silver medalist(s)	Italy	Fabio Ciaponi, Andrea Agostini, Paolo Agostini, Fausto Bonzi	21
3rd place, bronze medalist(s)	Ireland	John Lenihan, Robin Bryson, Tommy Payne, Eamonn Mc Mahon	31

=== Men junior ===
Distance 8.3 km, difference in height 570 m, participants 57.

Rank	Athlete	Country	Time
1st place, gold medalist(s)	Ulrich Steidl	Germany	39:25
2nd place, silver medalist(s)	Markus Kröll	Austria	39:45
3rd place, bronze medalist(s)	Dario Fracassi	Italy	40:18
4	Turati Silvano	Switzerland	40:33
5	Ondrej Valenta	Czechoslovakia	40:46
6	Raphael Neyret	France	40:51
7	Oliver Michels	France	41:14
8	Elmar Hugo	Switzerland	41:21
9	Simone Lenzi	Italy	41:29
10	Simone Pagani	Italy	41:38

=== Men junior team ===
Rank	Country	Athletes	Points
1st place, gold medalist(s)	Italy	Dario Fracassi, Simone Lenzi, Simone Pagani, Martin Mayerhofer	22
2nd place, silver medalist(s)	Germany	Ulrich Steidl, Andre Nuebauer, Felix Sippli, Patrick Heinlein	38
3rd place, bronze medalist(s)	Switzerland	Silvano Turati, Elmar Hugo, Roman Wenk	38

=== Women ===
Distance 8.3 km, difference in height 570 m, participants 59.

Rank	Athlete	Country	Time
1st place, gold medalist(s)	Isabelle Guillot	France	41:00
2nd place, silver medalist(s)	Manuela Di Centa	Italy	43:02
3rd place, bronze medalist(s)	Annie Mougl	France	43:09
4	Eroica Spiess	Switzerland	44:20
5	Monika Graf	Switzerland	44:24
6	Mariko Ducret	Switzerland	45:09
7	Maria Cocchetti	Italy	45:29
8	Elisabeth Rust	Austria	46:03
9	Gaby Schütz	Switzerland	46:04
10	Barbara Guerike	Germany	46:25

=== Women team ===
Rank	Country	Athletes	Points
1st place, gold medalist(s)	France	Isabelle Guillot, Annie Mougl, H. Evelyne Mura, Simone Bois	14
2nd place, silver medalist(s)	Switzerland	Eroica Spiess, Monika Graf, Maria Ducret, Gaby Schuetz	15
3rd place, bronze medalist(s)	Italy	Manuela Di Centa, Maria Cocchetti, Maria Grazia Roberti, Pina Deiana	22
