= Andrea Mayr =

Austrian long-distance runner

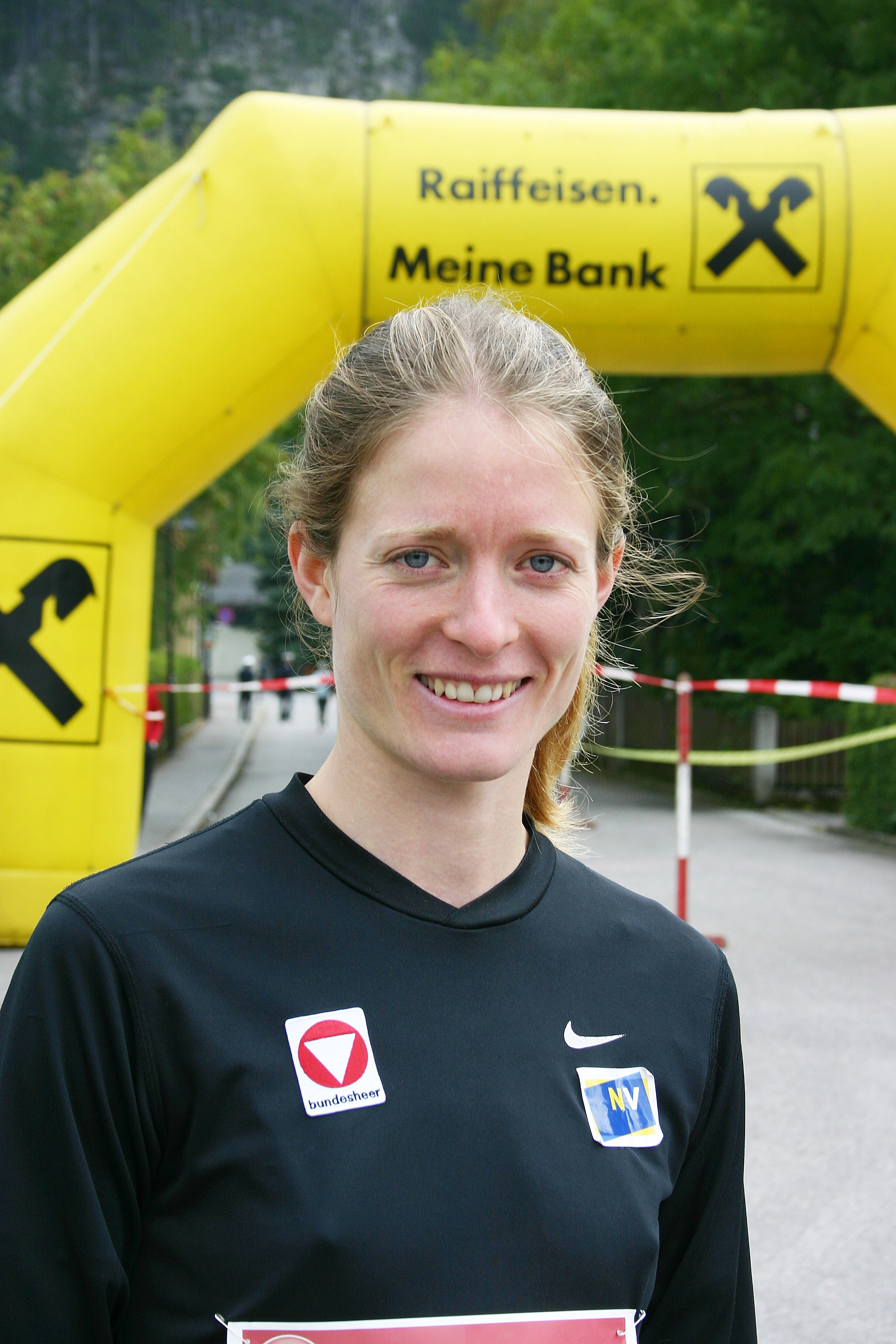
- Andrea Mayr.

Personal information
- Born: 15 October 1979 (age 46) Eisenstadt, Austria
- Height: 1.75 m (5 ft 9 in)
- Weight: 54 kg (119 lb)

Sport
- Country: Austria
- Sport: Athletics
- Event: Marathon
Medal record
Mountain running
World Championships
| Bronze medal – third place | 2004 Sauze d'Ouix | Long race |
| Winner | 2006 Bursa | Long race |
| Runner-up | 2007 Ovronnaz | Long race |
| Winner | 2008 Crans-Montana | Long race |
| Winner | 2010 Kamnik | Long race |
| Winner | 2012 Ponte di Legno | Long race |
| Winner | 2014 Casete di Massa | Long race |
| Winner | 2016 Sapareva Banya | Long race |
| Runner-up | 2017 Premana | Long race |
| Runner-up | 2022 Chiang Mai | Uphill |
| Winner | 2023 Innsbruck | Uphill |
Ski mountaineering
World Championships
| Gold medal – first place | 2017 Alpago/Piancavallo | Vertical race |
| Gold medal – first place | 2019 Villars-sur-Ollon | Vertical race |

Andrea Mayr (born 15 October 1979) is a female long-distance runner from Austria. She also competes in mountain running, cycling and ski mountaineering. She set her personal best (2:30:43) in the women's marathon on 19 April 2009, winning the Vienna City Marathon. She holds the Austrian records over the half marathon and marathon distances. She is the most accomplished athlete in World Mountain Running Championships history with seven titles and has also won world championships in ski mountaineering

== Biography ==
She represented Austria in the 3000 metres steeplechase at both the 2005 and 2007 World Championships in Athletics, although she did not make it past the heats. She won the event in the Second League section of the 2008 European Cup and managed a silver for Austria in the Second League of the 2010 European Team Championships.

Mayr set a course record at the 2008 Obudu Ranch International Mountain Race in Nigeria. She won the World Mountain Running Championships in 2010, beating runner-up Valentina Belotti by over half a minute in the 8.5 km race. She also won the WMRA Grand Prix series that year: she had already secured the title before the final by merit of having an unassailable lead in the points table, yet she went on to win the Smarna Gora race finale and further cement her position as the world's top female mountain runner. She is the record holder of the Empire State Building Run-Up (11:23, 2006). She has seven World Mountain Running titles.

Mayr competed in the 2012 London Olympics for Austria. She finished 54th in the women's marathon.

== Achievements ==
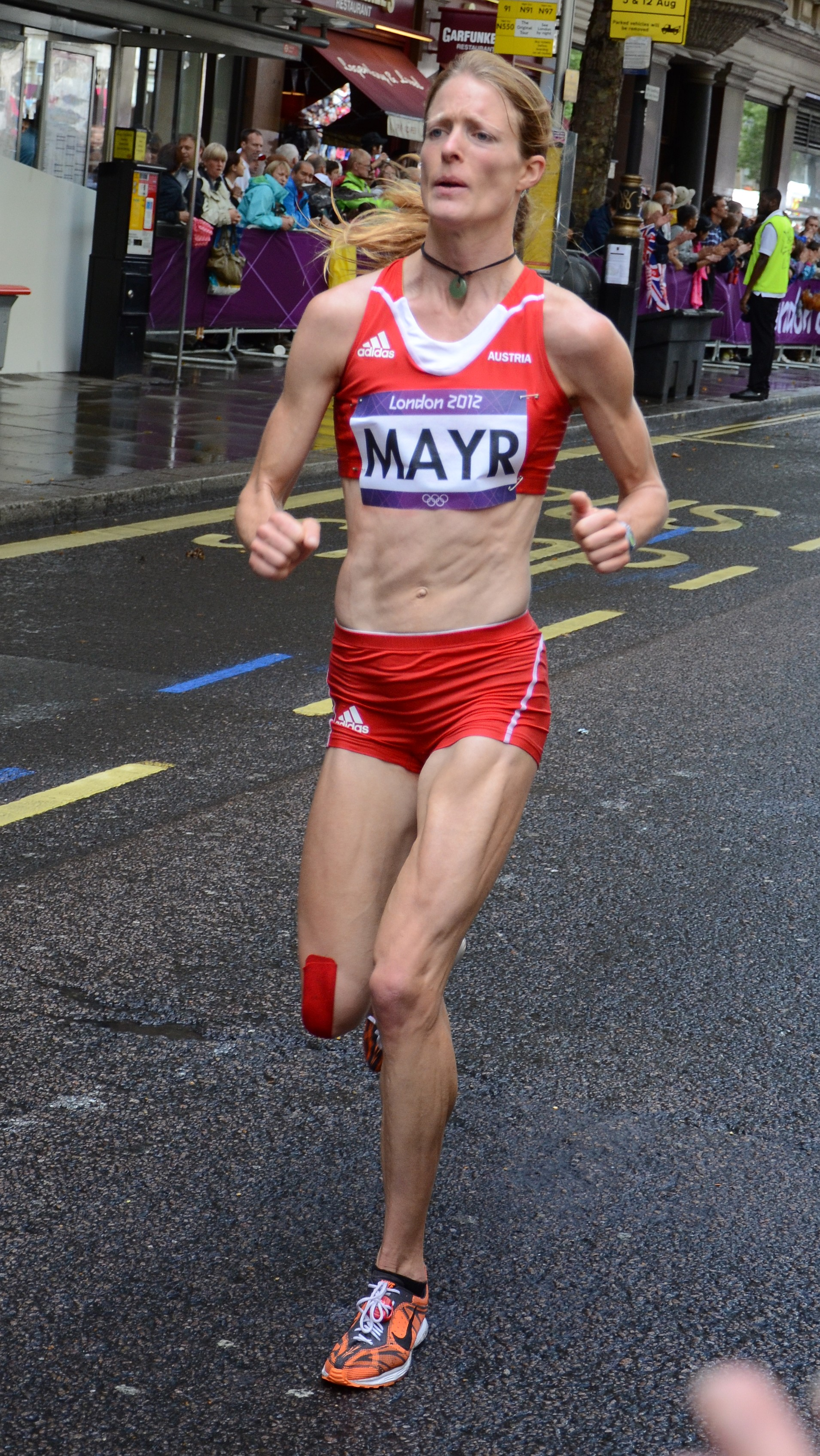
Mayr in the 2012 Summer Olympics marathon

| Year | Competition | Venue | Position | Event | Notes |
|---|---|---|---|---|---|
| 2009 | Vienna City Marathon | Vienna, Austria | 1st | Marathon | 2:30:43 |
| 2009 | European Mountain Running Championships | Telfes im Stubai, Austria | 3rd | 9.5 km | 56:55 |
| 2010 | Vienna City Marathon | Vienna, Austria | 5th | Marathon | 2:34:09 |
