= 2005 World Mountain Running Trophy =

- Organisers: WMRA
- Edition: 21st
- Dates: 25 September
- Host city: Wellington, New Zealand
- Level: Senior and Junior
- Events: 8

The 2005 World Mountain Running Championships was the 21st edition of the global mountain running competition, World Mountain Running Championships, organised by the World Mountain Running Association.

== Results ==
=== Men Senior ===
Distance 13.5 km, difference in height 930 m, participants 111.

Individual

Rank	Runner	Country	Time
1st place, gold medalist(s)	Jonathan Wyatt	New Zealand	53:23
2nd place, silver medalist(s)	Gabriele Abate	Italy	55:35
3rd place, bronze medalist(s)	Davide Chicco	Italy	55:41
4	Marco Gaiardo	Italy	56:08
5	Helmut Schiessl	Germany	56:22
6	Dale Warrander	New Zealand	56:24
7	Ricardo Mejía	Mexico	56:28
8	Emanuele Manzi	Italy	56:47
9	Sebastien Epiney	Switzerland	57:13
10	Simon Gutierrez	United States	57:20

Team

Rank	Team	Athletes	Points
1st place, gold medalist(s)	Italy	Gabriele Abate, Davide Chicco, Marco Gaiardo, Emanuele Manzi, Alessio Rinaldi, Antonio Molinari	17
2nd place, silver medalist(s)	New Zealand	Jonathan Wyatt, Dale Warrander, Benjamin Revell, Michael Wakelin, Callum Harland, Phil Costley	75
3rd place, bronze medalist(s)	France	Julien Rancon, Jean-Christophe Dupont, Thierry Breuil, Arnaud Fourdin, Thierry Icart, Benjamin Dubois	101

=== Women Senior ===
Distance 9.1 km, difference in height 620 m, participants 65.

Individual

Rank	Runner	Country	Time
1st place, gold medalist(s)	Kate McIlroy	New Zealand	39:40
2nd place, silver medalist(s)	Tracey Brindley	Scotland	41:42
3rd place, bronze medalist(s)	Anna Pichrtova	Czech Republic	41:59
4	Mary Wilkinson	England	42:39
5	Isabelle Guillot	France	42:47
6	Vittoria Salvini	Italy	42:56
7	Melissa Moon	New Zealand	43:21
8	Laura Haefeli	United States	43:38
9	Maria Grazia Roberti	Italy	43:46
10	Pierangela Baronchelli	Italy	44:10

Team

Rank	Team	Athletes	Points
1st place, gold medalist(s)	Italy	Vittoria Salvini, Maria Grazia Roberti, Pierangela Baronchelli, Elisa Desco	25
2nd place, silver medalist(s)	Scotland	Tracey Brindley, Sula Young, Angela Mudge, Jill Mykura	38
3rd place, bronze medalist(s)	Czech Republic	Anna Pichrtova, Pavla Matyasova, Iva Milesova, Martina Cermankova	48

=== Junior Men ===
Distance 9.1 km, difference in height 620 m, participants 50.

Individual

Rank	Runner	Country	Time
1st place, gold medalist(s)	Vedat Gunen	Turkey	36:48
2nd place, silver medalist(s)	Juan Carlos Carera	Mexico	37:20
3rd place, bronze medalist(s)	Martin Dematteis	Italy	37:28
4	Ahmet Arslan	Turkey	37:46
5	Bernard Dematteis	Italy	38:34
6	Jan Hamr	Czech Republic	38:57
7	Fahri Tunctan	Turkey	38:59
8	Ingiona Scaffidi	Italy	39:02
9	Benjamin Choquert	France	39:38
10	Bernd Weberhofer	Austria	40:00

Team

Rank	Team	Athletes	Points
1st place, gold medalist(s)	Turkey	Vedat Gunen, Ahmet Arslan, Fahri Tunctan	12
2nd place, silver medalist(s)	Italy	Martin Dematteis, Bernard Dematteis, Ingiona Scaffidi, Andrea Rizzardini	16
3rd place, bronze medalist(s)	Czech Republic	Jan Hamr, David Rosenberg, Martin Zapalac, Lukas Pazdera	41

=== Junior Women ===
Distance 4.7 km, difference in height 310 m, participants 30.

Individual

Rank	Runner	Country	Time
1st place, gold medalist(s)	Yulia Mochalova	Russia	21:50
2nd place, silver medalist(s)	Mateja Kosovelj	Slovenia	22:00
3rd place, bronze medalist(s)	Hulya Ongun	Turkey	22:46
4	Lucija Krkoc	Slovenia	22:54
5	Suza Mladenovic	Slovenia	23:31
6	Ruth Croft	New Zealand	23:45
7	Rachael Thompson	England	23:46
8	Katarina Beresova	Slovakia	23:46
9	Valentina Ghiazza	Italy	23:48
10	Narin Saglan	Turkey	23:50

Team

Rank	Team	Athletes	Points
1st place, gold medalist(s)	Slovenia	Mateja Kosovelj, Lucija Krkoc, Suza Mladenovic	6
2nd place, silver medalist(s)	Russia	Yulia Mochalova, Natalia Nemkina	12
3rd place, bronze medalist(s)	Turkey	Hulya Ongun, Narin Saglan, Melike Ucar	13

== Medal table (junior events included) ==
Rank	Country	1st place, gold medalist(s)	2nd place, silver medalist(s)	3rd place, bronze medalist(s)	Tot.
1	Italy	3	1	0	4
2	New Zealand	2	1	1	4
3	Eritrea	1	1	0	2
3	France	1	1	0	2
5	Scotland	1	0	0	1
6	Austria	0	3	0	3
7	Germany	0	1	2	3
8	Poland	0	0	2	2
8	Switzerland	0	0	2	2
10	Czech Republic	0	0	1	1
