= Giuliana Savaris =

Italian mountain runner

Personal information
- National team: Italy (5 cap in 1987-1992)
- Born: 22 January 1959 (age 67) Lentiai, Italy

Sport
- Country: Italy
- Sport: Mountain running
Medal record
Mountain running
World Championships
Bronze medal – third place	1987 Lenzerheide-Valbella	Individual

Giuliana Savaris (born 22 January 1959) is a former Italian female mountain runner who won a medal at individual senior level at the World Mountain Running Championships.

== See also ==
- Italy at the World Mountain Running Championships
