= Chiara Saporetti =

Italian mountain runner

Personal information
- National team: Italy (1 cap in 1985)
- Born: 18 August 1969 (age 56) Ivrea, Italy

Sport
- Country: Italy
- Sport: Mountain running
Medal record
Mountain running
World Championships
Silver medal – second place	1985 San Vigilio di Marebbe	Individual

Chiara Saporetti (born 18 August 1969) is a former Italian female mountain runner who won a medal at individual senior level at the World Mountain Running Championships.

== See also ==
- Italy at the World Mountain Running Championships
