= Mark Kinch =

English runner

Mark Kinch (born 11 April 1963) is an English former runner who was a national fell running champion and represented his country at the World Mountain Running Trophy in the mid-1990s.

As a youth, Kinch competed in the 3000m steeplechase but spent time away from the sport in his early twenties. On his return, he had some good but not outstanding results in cross country and road races. After being introduced to fell running and changing coaches to Tony Hulme, he began to have greater success.

Kinch won both the British and English Fell Running Championships in 1994 and retained the titles the next year. In 1996, he lost them to Ian Holmes, with Holmes noting some years later that the rivalry with Kinch had helped him to reach the best form of his life.

In 1995, Kinch won the Snowdon Race in a time of 1:02:58, the second fastest time in the history of the race.

He represented England at the World Mountain Running Trophy in 1994, 1995, when he finished thirteenth, and 1996. He also ran at the European Trophy, finishing sixth in 1996.

Kinch was the winner of the British Open Fell Runners Association Championships in 1997 and 1998. This is a different series from the main British Fell Running Championships and consists of relatively short races typically derived from or similar to professional guides races. He was also the British Trail Running Champion at the marathon distance in 1998 and retained that title in 1999. He later acted as a fell and mountain running team manager for England.

Kinch still holds the course records for the fell races at Dale Head and Kinder Downfall.
