= Dolomitenmann =

Extreme sports relay race held in Austria

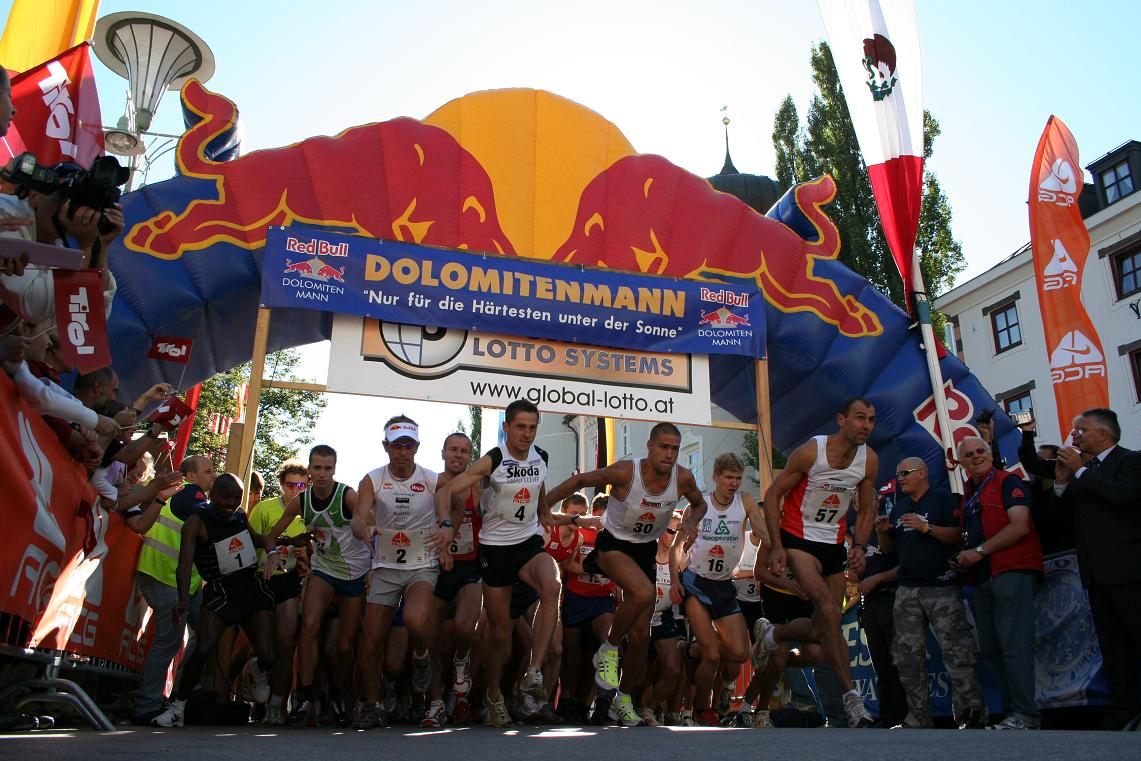
Start of the 19th Dolomitenmann in 2006

The Dolomitenmann is an extreme sports relay race held in September in the East Tyrolean, or so-called Dolomite Mountains of Austria, near the city of Lienz. The founder and organiser is Werner Grissmann, a former World Cup skier.

The Dolomitenmann relay race has been run annually since 1988. In recent years the race has been sponsored by the manufacturers of Red Bull energy drink and is now known as Red Bull Dolomitenmann. The race is billed by its organizers as "the world's toughest team relay race".

The competition is only open to male athletes. Race organizer Werner Grissmann justifies this with the statement that he wishes to protect women, since the competition is only meant for the "hardest athletes", he does not want "to see women suffer" and that it would be "incompatible with their aesthetics". In 2017 for the first time there was a side competition that was also open to female athletes.

== Disciplines ==
- mountain running
- paragliding
- mountainbiking
- whitewater kayaking

== Course ==
The race is started by the mountain runner on the town square of Lienz at 674 metres (2,211 ft) above sea level. who then runs a distance of around 12 kilometres (7.5 mi) up to Kühbodentörl at 2,441 metres (8,009 ft).

When the runner makes the hand-off to the team's paraglider, he must also run, this time with his whole equipment to the first take-off point. After descending by air to Moosalm, the paraglider runs to a second take-off point, descending to Leisach where the mountain biker is ready and waiting.

The mountain biker typically climbs 1,600 metres (5,200 ft) or more, over a distance of about 27 kilometres (17 mi). After the climb, the mountain biker must ride a downhill track to the finish.

The teams kayaker swims across the river Drau where his boat is stationed. His first maneuver is an "alpine-start", or a drop off a 7 metres (23 ft) ramp into the river. After the jump the kayaker must navigate a difficult white water track on the river Isel before a last sprint back to the main square of Lienz.

== Winning teams and tracks ==
#	Year	Teams	Track	Winners	Time	Comment
1	1988-09-11	51	Goisele	Schlickermandln Nordtirol (AUT) Florian Stern (AUT) André Bucher (AUT) Markus Dobesch (AUT) Ernst Denifl (AUT)	3:25:47,6	
2	1989-09-10	57	Steiner Mandl	Schlickermandln Nordtirol (AUT) Florian Stern (AUT) André Bucher (AUT) Markus Dobesch (AUT) Ernst Denifl (AUT)	3:48:14,5	
3	1990-09-09	54	Steiner Mandl	Hypobank Figaro Lienz (AUT) Hansjörg Randl (AUT) Walter Holzmüller (AUT) Holger Kerbl (AUT) Uli Mattersberger (AUT)	3:58:06,6	First participation of a Red Bull Team. Team finished in 2nd place.
4	1991-09-01	71	Steiner Mandl	Red Bull (AUT) Alois Stadlober (AUT) Hansjörg Bachmayr (AUT) Peter Winkler (AUT) Manfred Kornelson (AUT)	4:13:39,2	
5	1992-09-13	100	Laserzwand	Profi-Team (AUT) Florian Stern (AUT) André Bucher (AUT) Alex Schimanofsky (AUT) Jürgen Juen (AUT)	4:05:03,3	
6	1993-09-12	125	Karlsbader Törl	Warsteiner Team (INT) Helmut Schmuck (AUT) David Perathoner (AUT) Markus Gickler (GER) Gerhard Zadrobilek (AUT)	3:55:54,0	
7	1994-09-10	79	Kühboden Törl	Red Bull Körper (AUT) Florian Stern (AUT) André Bucher (AUT) Markus Dobesch (AUT) Ernst Denifl (AUT)	3:52:55,2	
8	1995-09-09	58	Steinermandl	Red Bull 1 (AUT) Peter Schatz (AUT) Wendelin Ortner (AUT) Kurt Pock (AUT) Eckehard Dörschlag (AUT)	3:33:05,9	
9	1996-09-07	36	Steinermandl	Warsteiner Team (INT) Helmut Schmuck (AUT) Mario Insam (ITA) Thomas Becker (GER) Sigi Hochenwarter (AUT)	3:04:59,2	25 cm snow at Zettersfeld; -5 °C at finish line Paragliding contest had to be cancelled
10	1997-09-06	46	Hochstadl	Red Bull Körper (INT) Markus Kröll (AUT) Alfons Hörhagel (AUT) Thomas Hilger (GER) Roland Stauder (AUT)	3:35:09,1	
11	1998-09-12	65	Steiner Mandl	Red Bull Geist (INT) Markus Kröll (AUT) Thomas Hilger (AUT) Roland Stauder (ITA)	3:00:28,7	Paragliding contest had to be cancelled due to gusty conditions.
12	1999-09-11	84	Steiner Mandl	Red Bull Geist (INT) Markus Kröll (AUT) Alfons Hörhagel (AUT) Thomas Hilger (GER) Alessandro Fontana (ITA)	3:35:46,2	
13	2000-09-09	94	Steiner Mandl	Red Bull Geist (INT) Markus Kröll (AUT) Alfons Hörhagel (AUT) Thomas Hilger (GER) Roland Stauder (ITA)	3:36:04,1	
14	2001-09-08	102	Steiner Mandl	Red Bull Geist (INT) Markus Kröll (AUT) Alfons Hörhagel (AUT) Thomas Hilger (GER) Roland Stauder (ITA)	3:24:26,0	
15	2002-09-07	111	Kühboden Törl	Red Bull (INT) Markus Kröll (AUT) Wendelin Ortner (AUT) Stefan Steinhöfer (GER) Roland Stauder (ITA)	3:55:17,3	22 teams on waitlist
16	2003-09-06	110	Kühboden Törl	Skoda Auto (INT) Robert Krupicka (CZE) Tomas Lednik (CZE) Kamil Mruzek (CZE) Jure Golcer (SLO)	3:45:11,7	46 teams on waitlist
17	2004-09-11	110	Kühboden Törl	Leingruber Fighter (INT) Jonathan Wyatt (NZL) Chrisian Amon (AUT) Harald Hudetz (AUT) Hanspeter Obwaller (AUT)	3:50:53,4	184 teams on waitlist
18	2005-09-10	110	Kühboden Törl	Leingruber Fighter (INT) Jonathan Wyatt (NZL) Chrisian Amon (AUT) Herwig Natmessnig (AUT) Alban Lakata (AUT)	3:53:36,3	208 teams on waitlist
19	2006-09-09	110	Kühboden Törl	Red Bull (INT) Markus Kröll (AUT) Wendelin Ortner (AUT) Harald Hudetz (AUT) Roland Stauder (ITA)	3:55:41,6	260 teams on waitlist
20	2007-09-08	110	Kühboden Törl	Kolland Top Sport - Kleine Zeitung (INT) Helmut Schiessl (AUT) Chrisian Amon (AUT) Herwig Natmessnig (AUT) Alban Lakata (AUT)	3:26:14,0	263 teams on waitlist Paragliding contest had to be cancelled due to gusty conditions.
21	2008-09-06	110	Kühboden Törl	Kolland Top Sport (INT) Jonathan Wyatt (NZL) Chrisian Amon (AUT) Herwig Natmessnig (AUT) Alban Lakata (AUT)	3:00:17,2	272 teams on waitlist Paragliding contest had to be started from Moosalm due to gusty conditions.
22	2009-09-12	111	Kühboden Törl	Kolland Top Sport - Kleine Zeitung (INT) Jonathan Wyatt (NZL) Chrisian Amon (AUT) Herwig Natmessnig (AUT) Alban Lakata (AUT)	3:54:46,1	
23	2010-09-11	115	Kühboden Törl	Kolland Top Sport - Kleine Zeitung (INT) Jonathan Wyatt (NZL) Chrisian Amon (AUT) Marcel Potocny (SVK) Christoph Soukup (AUT)	3:50:39,5	
24	2011-09-10	115	Kühboden Törl	Robotunits (INT) Azarya Weldemariam (ERI) Markus Prantl (ITA) Gerhard Schmid (AUT) Hannes Pallhuber (ITA)	3:55:01,7	
25	2012-09-08	125	Kühboden Törl	Pure Encapsulations Team (INT) Azarya Weldemariam (ERI) Markus Prantl (ITA) Gerhard Schmid (AUT) Hannes Pallhuber (ITA)	3:57:15,5	
26	2013-09-07	121	Kühboden Törl	Kleine Zeitung (INT) Petro Mamu (ERI) Jakob Herrmann (AUT) Manuel Filzwieser (AUT) Urs Huber (SUI)	3:52:23,7	
27	2014-09-06	124	Kühboden Törl	Adidas Outdoor (INT) Abraham Kidane-Habtom (ERI) Jakob Herrmann (AUT) Lukas Buchli (SUI) Stephan Brodicky (AUT)	4:07:57,8	Racing order has been changed to mountain running, paragliding, mountain biking and whitewater kayaking.
28	2015-09-12	116	Kühboden Törl	Kleine Zeitung - Panaceo - Martini Sportswear (INT) Petro Mamu (ERI) Lorenz Peer (AUT) Kristian Hynek (CZE) Manuel Filzwieser (AUT)	4:07:57,7	Hand over from paragliding pilot to mountainbiker was moved to Lienz
29	2016-09-11	116	Kühboden Törl	Red Bull (INT) Anton Palzer (GER) Paul Guschlbauer (AUT) Alban Lakata (AUT) Harald Hudetz (AUT)	4:07:25	
30	2017-09-09	128	Kühboden Törl	Pure Encapsulations (INT) Philip Götsch (ITA) Markus Prantl (ITA) Tony Longo (ITA) Gerhard Schmid (AUT)	4:07:25	Paragliding contest had to be started from Moosalm
31	2018-09-08	124	Kühboden Törl	Kolland Topsport Professional (INT) Joseph Gray (USA) Christian Maurer (SUI) Daniel Geismayr (AUT) Lukáš Kubričan (CZE)	4:06:46	
32	2019-09-07	123	~~Kühboden Törl~~; Hochstein	Kolland Topsport Professional Joseph Gray (USA) Christian Maurer (SUI) Juri Ragnoli (ITA) Lukáš Kubričan (CZE)	3:47:02	Due to bad weather the track had to be changed.
33	2020-09-12	96	Kühboden Törl	Kolland Topsport Professional (INT) Remi Bonnet (SUI) Christian Maurer (SUI) Juri Ragnoli (ITA) Lukáš Kubričan (CZE)	4:21:27	Due to the COVID-19 pandemic the route had to be modified.
34	2021-09-11	97	Kühboden Törl	Kolland Topsport Professional (INT) Joseph Gray (USA) Christian Maurer (SUI) Hector-Leonardo Paez-Leon (COL) Lukáš Kubričan (CZE)	04:08:16	

Key
hosted in Zettersfeld region (not in Lienzer Dolomiten)
paragliding contest cancelled
paragliding contest on shortened track

The fastest athlete of each discipline receives a trophy and the title Dolomitenmann. Until 2019 the trophies were designed by Jos Pirkner.

== Dolomitenmen ==
Winners so far
Year	Mountain running	Paragliding	Mountainbike	Whitewater kayak
1988	Florian Stern (AUT)	André Bucher (AUT)	Ernst Denifl (AUT)	Alexander Schimansky (AUT)
1989	Peter Pfitscher (AUT)	Peter Geg (AUT)	Dörschlag Ekkehard (AUT)	Kurt Pock (AUT)
1990	Hansjörg Randl (AUT)	Walter Holzmüller (AUT)	Uli Mattersberger (AUT)	Kurt Pock (AUT)
1991	Peter Schatz (AUT)	Hansjörg Bachmayr (AUT)	Manfred Kornelson (AUT)	Kurt Pock (AUT)
1992	Helmut Schmuck (AUT)	Andre Pucher (AUT)	Hubert Pallhuber (ITA)	Alexander Kirn (AUT)
1993	Peter Schatz (AUT)	David Perathoner (ITA)	Gerhard Zadrobilek (AUT)	Kurt Pock (AUT)
1994	Helmut Schmuck (AUT)	Wendelin Ortner (AUT)	Dörschlag Ekkehard (AUT)	Markus Gickler (GER)
1995	Pio Tomasselli (ITA)	Alfons Hörhager (AUT)	Thomas Ilg (AUT)	Thomas Becker (GER)
1996	Helmut Schmuck (AUT)	– (cancelled)	Roland Stauder (ITA)	Thomas Hilger (GER)
1997	Helmut Schmuck (AUT)	Wendelin Ortner (AUT)	Roland Stauder (ITA)	Thomas Hilger (GER)
1998	Helmut Schmuck (AUT)	– (cancelled)	Roland Stauder (ITA)	Thomas Hilger (GER)
1999	Peter Schatz (AUT)	Alfons Hörhager (AUT)	Roland Stauder (ITA)	Thomas Hilger (GER)
2000	Robert Krupicka (CZE)	Alfons Hörhager (AUT)	Hannes Pallhuber (ITA)	Thomas Hilger (GER)
2001	Roman Skalsky (CZE)	Wendelin Ortner (AUT)	Roland Stauder (ITA)	Thomas Hilger (GER)
2002	Markus Kröll (AUT)	Christian Amon (AUT)	Roland Stauder (ITA)	Gerhard Schmid (AUT)
2003	John Maluni (KEN)	Wendelin Ortner (AUT)	Juri Golcer (SLO)	Gerhard Schmid (AUT)
2004	Jonathan Wyatt (NZL)	Wendelin Ortner (AUT)	Hannes Pallhuber (ITA)	Harald Hudetz (AUT)
2005	Jonathan Wyatt (NZL)	Christian Amon (AUT)	Roland Stauder (ITA)	Gerhard Schmid (AUT)
2006	Jiri Magal (CZE)	Wendelin Ortner (AUT)	Hannes Pallhuber (ITA)	Harald Hudetz (AUT)
2007	Jiri Magal (CZE)	– (cancelled)	Alban Lakata (AUT)	Kamil Mruzek (CZE)
2008	Jonathan Wyatt (NZL)	Markus Prantl (ITA) (short track)	Hannes Pallhuber (ITA)	Harald Hudetz (AUT)
2009	Jonathan Wyatt (NZL)	Markus Prantl (ITA)	Alban Lakata (AUT)	Harald Hudetz (AUT)
2010	Jonathan Wyatt (NZL)	Paul Guschlbauer (AUT)	Tony Longo (ITA)	Harald Hudetz (AUT)
2011	Azarya Weldemariam (ERI)	Markus Prantl (ITA)	Hynek Kristian (CZE)	Harald Hudetz (AUT)
2012	Azarya Weldemariam (ERI)	Markus Prantl (ITA)	Hynek Kristian (CZE)	Harald Hudetz (AUT)
2013	Petro Mamu (ERI)	Paul Guschlbauer (AUT)	Hynek Kristian (CZE)	Herwig Natmessnig (AUT)
2014	Petro Mamu (ERI)	Paul Guschlbauer (AUT)	Lukas Buchli (SUI)	Herwig Natmessnig (AUT)
2015	Petro Mamu (ERI)	Markus Prantl (ITA)	Hynek Kristian (CZE)	Gerhard Schmid (AUT)
2016	Petro Mamu (ERI)	Christian Maurer (SUI)	Hynek Kristian (CZE)	Lukáš Kubričan (CZE)
2017	Philip Götsch (ITA)	Aaron Durogati (ITA) (short track)	Hynek Kristian (CZE)	Lukáš Kubričan (CZE)
2018	Joseph Gray (USA)	Aaron Durogati (ITA)	Daniel Geismayr (AUT)	Lukáš Kubričan (CZE)
2019	Joseph Gray (USA)	Lukas Rifesser (ITA) (alternate track)	Daniel Geismayr (AUT)	Lukáš Kubričan (CZE)
2020	Francesco Puppi (ITA)	Christian Maurer (SUI)	Andreas Seewald (GER)	Lukáš Kubričan (CZE)
2021	Joseph Gray (USA)	Christian Maurer (SUI)	Hector-Leonardo Paez-Leon (COL)	Lukáš Kubričan (CZE)

As of September 2020, there are 58 Dolomitenmen from 10 nations.

== Top 10 Dolomitenmen (as of September 2021) ==
#	Name	# of wins
1	Roland Stauder (ITA)	7
1	Harald Hudetz (AUT)	7
3	Thomas Hilger (GER)	6
3	Wendelin Ortner (AUT)	6
3	Kristian Hynek (CZE)	6
6	Helmut Schmuck (AUT)	5
6	Jonathan Wyatt (NZL)	5
6	Markus Prantl (ITA)	5
6	Lukáš Kubričan (CZE)	5
10	Christian Maurer (SUI)	4
10	Kurt Pock (AUT)	4
10	Hannes Pallhuber (ITA)	4
10	Gerhard Schmid (AUT)	4
10	Petro Mamu (ERI)	4
14	Peter Schatz (AUT)	3
14	Alfons Hörhager (AUT)	3
14	Paul Guschlbauer (AUT)	3
