= Dita Hebelková =

Czech mountain runner

Personal information
- Nationality: Czech
- Born: 4 April 1976 (age 50)

Sport
- Country: Czech Republic
- Sport: Mountain running
Medal record
Event	1st	2nd	3rd
World Championships Individual	1	0	1
Total	1	0	1

Dita Hebelková (born 4 April 1976) is a former Czech mountain runner who won 1998 World Mountain Running Championships.
