= 1985 World Mountain Running Trophy =

1985 World Mountain Running Championships
- Organisers: WMRA
- Edition: 1st
- Date: 23 September
- Host city: San Vigilio di Marebbe, Italy
- Events: 4

The 1985 World Mountain Running Championships was the 1st edition of the global mountain running competition, World Mountain Running Championships, organised by the World Mountain Running Association and was held in San Vigilio di Marebbe, Italy on 23 September 1985.

== Results ==
=== Men individual ===
Distance 14.6 km, difference in height 1082 m, participants 38.

Rank	Athlete	Country	Time
1st place, gold medalist(s)	Alfonso Vallicella	Italy	1:06:54
2nd place, silver medalist(s)	Helmut Stuhlpfarrer	Austria	1:07:03
3rd place, bronze medalist(s)	Fausto Bonzi	Italy	1:09:41
4	Claudio Simi	Italy	1:09:58
5	Kenny Stuart	England	1:10:38
6	Beat Imhof	Switzerland	1:10:51
7	Privato Pezzoli	Italy	1:11:01
8	Hans-Peter Näpflin	Switzerland	1:11:41
9	Fritz Häni	Switzerland	1:12:02
10	Reinhold Mayer	West Germany	1:12:14

=== Team men ===
Rank	Country	Athletes	Points
1st place, gold medalist(s)	Italy	Alfonso Vallicella, Fausto Bonzi, Claudio Simi, Privato Pezzoli	8
2nd place, silver medalist(s)	Switzerland	Beat Imhof, Hans-Peter Näpflin, Fritz Häni, Daniel Schaefer	23
3rd place, bronze medalist(s)	West Germany	Rainhold Mayer, Herbert Frenke, Siegfried Blum, Gustav Friscmann	34

=== Men short distance ===
Distance 8.5 km, difference in height 400 m, participants 32.

Rank	Athlete	Country	Time
1st place, gold medalist(s)	Kenny Stuart	England	32:58
2nd place, silver medalist(s)	Maurizio Simonetti	Italy	33:28
3rd place, bronze medalist(s)	Luigi Bortoluzzi	Italy	33:29
4	Battista Scanzi	Italy	34:11
5	Stefano Visini	Italy	34:50
6	Fritz Aebi	Switzerland	34:54
7	Toni Held	Switzerland	35:02
8	Ray Owen	England	35:09
9	Shaun Livesey	England	35:20
10	Dieter Notz	West Germany	35:02

=== Men short distance team ===
Rank	Country	Athletes	Points
1st place, gold medalist(s)	Italy	Maurizio Simonetti, Luigi Bortoluzzi, Battista Scanzi	9
2nd place, silver medalist(s)	England	Kenny Stuart, Ray Owen, Shaun Livesey	18
3rd place, bronze medalist(s)	Switzerland	Fritz Aebi, Toni Held, Andreas Dahinden	26

=== Men junior individual ===
Distance 6.0 km, difference in height 336 m, participants 23.

Rank	Athlete	Country	Time
1st place, gold medalist(s)	Batista Lizzoli	Italy	22:56
2nd place, silver medalist(s)	Robin Bergstrand	England	23:42
3rd place, bronze medalist(s)	Mich Wilson	England	23:53
4	Dominik Humbel	Switzerland	23:53
5	Emiliano Milesi	Italy	24:05
6	Franco Naitza	Italy	24:31
7	Elmar Ellgass	West Germany	24:42
8	Isidoro Cavagna	Italy	24:52
9	Didier Fatton	Switzerland	24:59
10	Markus Kögel	West Germany	25:02

=== Men junior team ===
Rank	Country	Athletes	Points
1st place, gold medalist(s)	Italy	Batista Lizzoli, Emiliano Milesi, Franco Naitza, Isidoro Cavagna	12
2nd place, silver medalist(s)	England	Robin Bergstrand, Mich Wilson, Sean Willis	20
3rd place, bronze medalist(s)	Switzerland	Dominik Humbel, Didier Fatton, Michael Stainer, Oliver Martinez	26

=== Women individual ===
Distance 6.0 km, difference in height 336 m, participants 26.

Rank	Athlete	Country	Time
1st place, gold medalist(s)	Olivia Grüner	West Germany	26:20
2nd place, silver medalist(s)	Chiara Saporetti	Italy	26:36
3rd place, bronze medalist(s)	Guidina Dal Sasso	Italy	26:42
4	Valentina Bottarelli	Italy	27:50
5	Christine Fladt	West Germany	27:55
6	Eroica Staudenmann	Switzerland	28:34
7	Sonia Basso	Italy	28:36
8	Andrea Zirknitzer	Austria	29:12
9	Pauline Haworth	England	29:24
10	Gaby Schütz	Switzerland	29:30

=== Women team ===
Rank	Country	Athletes	Points
1st place, gold medalist(s)	Italy	Chiara Saporetti, Guidina Dal Sasso, Valentina Bottarelli, Sonia Basso	9
2nd place, silver medalist(s)	West Germany	Olivia Gruener, Christine Fladt, Anemarie Gruenner, Ursula Urban	18
3rd place, bronze medalist(s)	Switzerland	Eroica Staudenmann, Gaby Schuetz, Margrit Wyss, Katrin Mueller	27
