= Matilde Ravizza =

Italian mountain runner

Personal information
- National team: Italy (12 cap in 1996-2004)
- Born: 27 December 1971 (age 54) Moncalieri, Italy

Sport
- Country: Italy
- Sport: Sport of athletics; Mountain running
- Events: Long-distance running; Cross-country running

Achievements and titles
- Personal best: Marathon: 2:38:14 (1997)
Medal record
Mountain running
Event	1st	2nd	3rd
World Championships (individual)	0	1	0
World Championships (team)	2	2	0
Total	2	3	0
World Championships
Silver medal – second place	1998 Dimitile La Reunion	Individual

Matilde Ravizza (born 27 December 1971) is a former Italian female mountain runner and long-distance runner who won a medal at individual senior level at the World Mountain Running Championships.

Ravizza won Florence Marathon in 1997.

== Biography ==
She also participated at the 1999 IAAF World Cross Country Championships – Senior women's race and was 4th in the marathon race at the 1997 Mediterranean Games

== See also ==
- Italy at the World Mountain Running Championships
