= Olivia Grüner =

German mountain runner

Personal information
- Nationality: German
- Born: 4 March 1969 (age 57)

Sport
- Country: Germany
- Sport: Mountain running
Medal record
| Event | 1st | 2nd | 3rd |
|---|---|---|---|
| World Championships Individual | 1 | 0 | 0 |
| Total | 1 | 0 | 0 |

Olivia Grüner (born 4 March 1969) is a former German mountain runner who won 1985 World Mountain Running Championships.
