= Jonathan Wyatt =

New Zealand long-distance runner

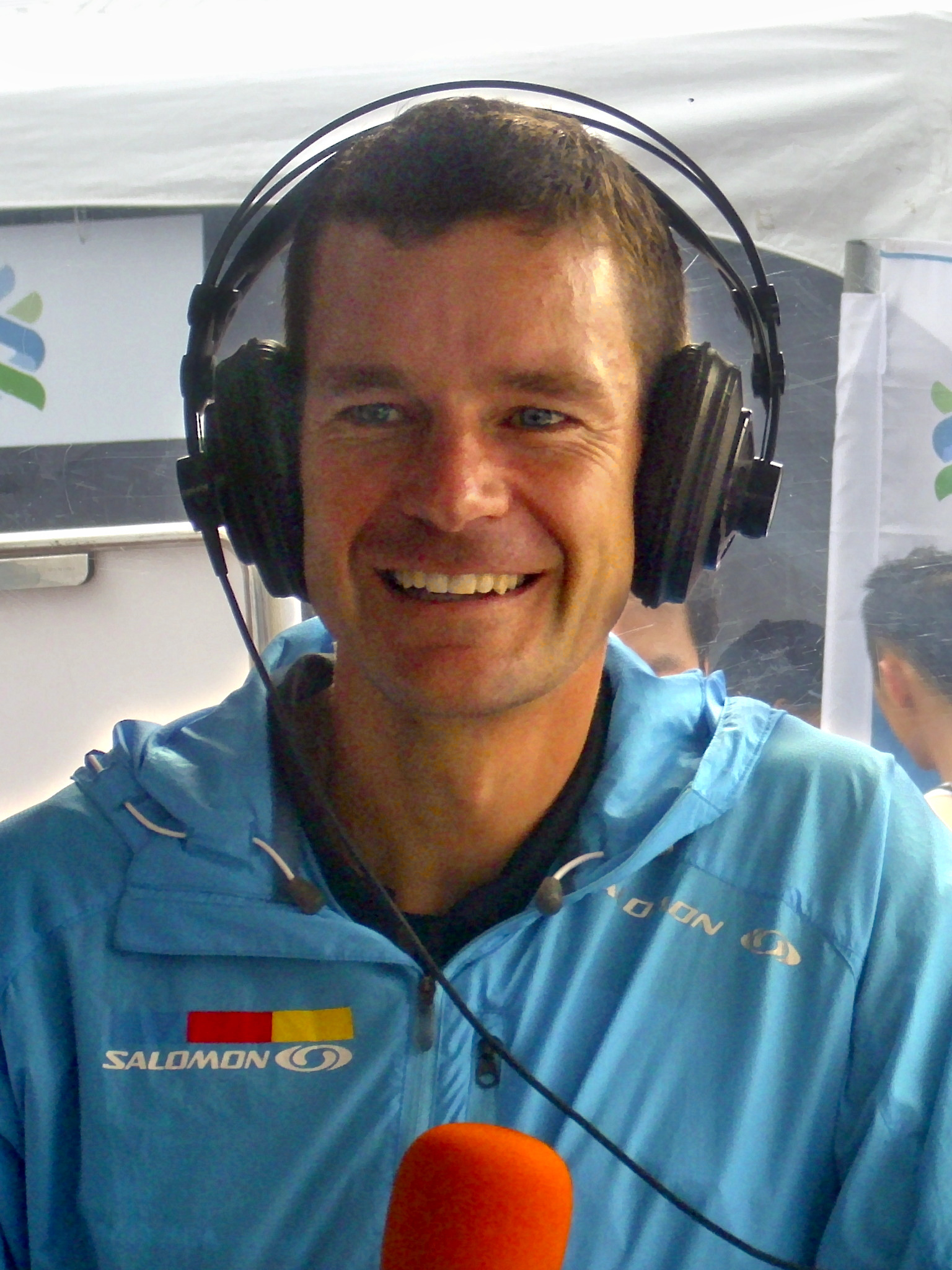
- Jonathan Wyatt was interviewed by ICRT at 2010 Taipei 101 Run Up.

Personal information
- Full name: Jonathan Craig Wyatt
- Born: 20 December 1972 (age 53) Lower Hutt, New Zealand
- Spouse: (Italy) Antonella Confortola

Sport
- Country: New Zealand
- Sport: Athletics; Mountain running Trail running Skyrunning; Snowshoe running

Achievements and titles
- World finals: 7 Mountain Running World Cup: 1999; 2002; 2003; 2004; 2005; 2006; 2008
Medal record
Mountain running
World Championships
Winner	1998 Dimitile	Long race
Winner	2000 Bergen	Long race
Winner	2002 Innsbruck	Long race
Winner	2004 Sauze d'Ouix	Long race
Winner	2005 Wellington	Long race
Runner-up	2006 Bursa	Long race
Winner	2008 Crans-Montana	Long race
Snowshoe running
World Championships
Bronze medal – third place	2010 Vancouver	Overall

Jonathan Craig Wyatt (born 20 December 1972) is a New Zealand runner. He is a six-time world mountain running champion and an eight-time winner of the world mountain running grand prix series.

== Running career ==
Wyatt competed in the men's 5,000 metres at the 1994 Commonwealth Games, reaching the final, and finished sixth in the men's marathon race at the 2002 Commonwealth Games. He is a two-time Olympian, competing at the 1996 Summer Olympics in the 5,000 metres and at the 2004 Summer Olympics in the marathon. He holds the New Zealand national record in the 5K at 13:46, and is the former national record holder for the 10K and half marathon.

Wyatt is a five-time winner of the Red Bull Dolomitenmann race.

== Post-running ==
Wyatt works for athletic brand La Sportiva. He became president of the World Mountain Running Association council in 2017.

== Personal life ==
Wyatt is married to Italian sky runner and cross-country skier Antonella Confortola. They live in northern Italy with their daughter.

== Achievements ==
Year	Competition	Venue	Position	Event	Notes
Representing New Zealand
1994	Athletics at the Commonwealth Games	Victoria, Canada	6th	Men's 5000m final	13:35:46
1998	World Mountain Running Trophy	Réunion, France	1st	Men's Individual	1:25:19
2000	World Mountain Running Trophy	Bergen, Germany	1st	Men's Individual	47:29
2001	Rotorua Marathon	Rotorua, New Zealand	1st	Marathon	2:20:50
2002	Athletics at the Commonwealth Games	Manchester, United Kingdom	6th	Men's Marathon	2:14:20
2002	World Mountain Running Trophy	Innsbruck, Austria	1st	Men's Individual	56:31
2003	Jungfrau Marathon	Interlaken, Switzerland	1st	Marathon	2:49:01
2004	Olympic Games	Athens, Greece	21st	Marathon	2:17:45
2004	World Mountain Running Trophy	Sauze d'Oulx, Italy	1st	Men's Individual	48:47
2005	World Mountain Running Trophy	Wellington, New Zealand	1st	Men's Individual	53:23
2006	World Mountain Running Trophy	Bursa, Turkey	2nd	Men's Individual	56:22
2007	Jungfrau Marathon	Interlaken, Switzerland	1st	Marathon	2:55:33
2008	World Mountain Running Trophy	Sierre-Crans Montana, Switzerland	1st	Men's Individual	55:04
2009	Jungfrau Marathon	Interlaken, Switzerland	1st	Marathon	2:58:33

== Other results ==
Nuten Opp

- (gold) 2007, 2008, 2009, 2010, 2011
