= Francisco Sánchez Martínez =

Colombian long-distance runner (1967–2022)

- Born: 5 August 1967; Bogotá, Colombia
- Died: 13 February 2022 (aged 54)
- Occupation: Long-distance runner

Francisco Sánchez Martínez (5 August 1967 – 13 February 2022) was a Colombian long-distance runner who specialized in mountain running. He won the bronze medal at the 1991 World Mountain Running Trophy and won the Sierre-Zinal the same year.

== Biography ==
Born in Bogotá, Sánchez practiced football and cycling in his youth. Due to his lack of professional skill in the sports, he took up running at the age of 20. He emerged as an elite runner in 1991, winning the Colombian Mountain Running Championship organized by Jairo Correa. The Colombian Athletics Federation sent him to Switzerland to take part in the Sierre-Zinal the same year, in which he emerged victorious and set a new course record. He outraced Correa at the Thyon-Dixence in Colombia. At the World Mountain Running Trophy in 1991, he led for much of the race, but was overtaken by Jean-Paul Payet late and eventually finished third.

In 1992, Sánchez again attempted to break the record at the Sierre-Zinal and started strong, but faltered in the second half of the race and finished 26th. In 1993, he set a new record at Le Bélier. On 11 February 1996, he won the Colombian Mountain Running Championship despite strong competition from the likes of Jacinto López. On 25 August of that year, he was victorious in the Matterhorn run. He retired from the World Championships and instead finished seventh in the Jungfrau Marathon.

Sánchez was nicknamed the "trucha" (trout) from a young age because his mother said he could not stand still as a child. He died on 13 February 2022, at the age of 54. According to his family, he had just received his third dose of the COVID-19 vaccine.
