= Dino Tadello =

Italian runner

Personal information
- Nationality: Italian
- Born: 27 December 1954 (age 71) Belluno

Sport
- Country: Italy
- Sport: Mountain running Masters athletics
- Club: Atletica Edilmarket Sandrin
Medal record
Event	1st	2nd	3rd
World Championships Individual	1	0	0
World Championships Team	1	0	0
Total	2	0	0

Dino Tadello (born 27 December 1954) is a former Italian male mountain runner and after masters athlete, who won 1987 World Mountain Running Championships.

== Biography ==
He won also one national championships at individual senior level.

== Achievements ==
Year	Competition	Venue	Position	Event	Time	Notes
1988	World championships	(United Kingdom) Keswick	1st	Individual race (14 km)	1:08:53	
1988	World championships	(United Kingdom) Keswick	1st	Team	7 points	

== National titles ==
- Italian Mountain Running Championships
  - Mountain running: 1988
