= David Schneider (orienteer) =

Swiss orienteering competitor

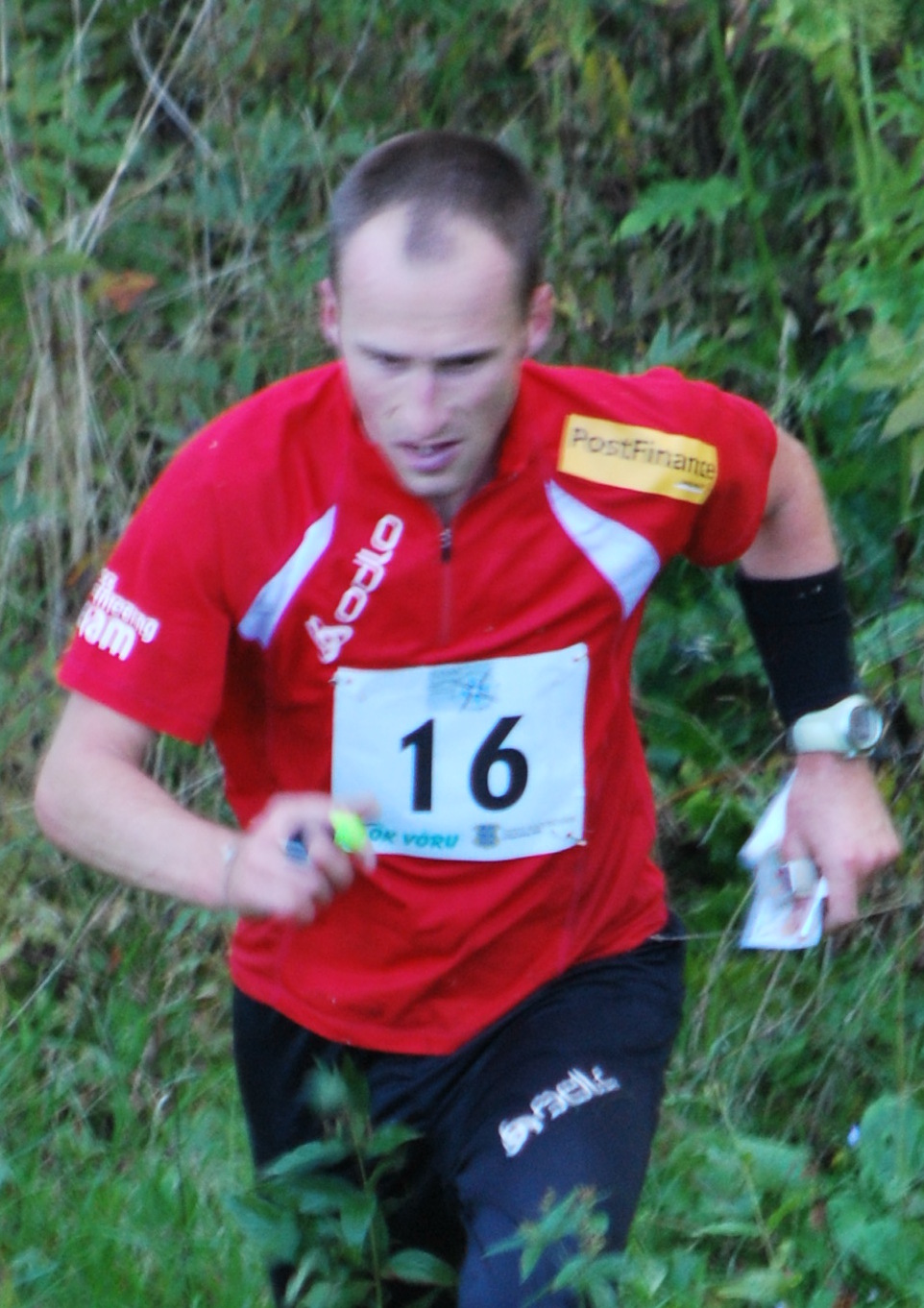
- Schneider in 2009

Medal record

Men's orienteering

Representing Switzerland

Junior World Championships
Bronze medal – third place	1996 Govora	Relay

David Schneider (born 27 April 1981) is a Swiss orienteering competitor. He received a bronze medal in the relay event at the 1996 Junior World Orienteering Championships in Govora.

He finished 4th in the relay with the Swiss team at the 2003 World Orienteering Championships in Rapperswil/Jona (with Thomas Bührer and Marc Lauenstein), and sixth in the sprint distance the same year. He finished 4th in the long distance at the 2005 World Orienteering Championships in Aichi.
