= Valentina Bottarelli =

Italian long-distance runner

Personal information
- National team: Italy (4 caps in 1985-1988)
- Born: 12 November 1948 (age 77) Sarezzo, Italy

Sport
- Country: Italy
- Sport: Athletics; Mountain running
- Event: Long-distance running

Achievements and titles
- Personal best: Marathon: 2:35:57 (1987)
Medal record
Mountain running
Event	1st	2nd	3rd
World Championships Individual	0	1	0
World Championships Team	1	2	0
Total	1	3	0
World Mountain Running Championships
Silver medal – second place	1986 Morbegno	Individual

Valentina Bottarelli (born 12 November 1948) is a former Italian female long-distance runner and mountain runner who won at individual senior level a silver medal at the World Mountain Running Championships.

== Biography ==
Valentina Bottarelli is the aunt of another Italian mountain runner, Sara Bottarelli.

== National titles ==
She won a national championship at individual senior level.

- Italian Mountain Running Championships
  - Individual: 1986

== See also ==
- Italy at the World Mountain Running Championships
