= Maria Cocchetti =

Italian athletics competitor

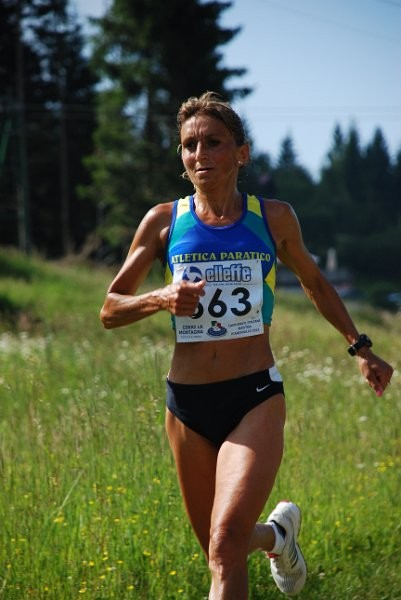
- Maria Cocchetti in 2012

Personal information
- Nationality: Italian
- Born: 19 June 1966 (age 60) Lovere

Sport
- Country: Italy
- Sport: Athletics; Mountain running
- Event: Marathon

Achievements and titles
- Personal bests: Half marathon: 1:13:53 (2003); Marathon: 2:33:06 (2002)
Medal record
Mountain running
Event	1st	2nd	3rd
World Championships Individual	0	1	0
World Championships Team	2	2	1
European Championships Individual	0	0	0
European Championships Team
Total	2	3	1
World Championships
Silver medal – second place	1990 Telfes	Individual

Maria Cocchetti (born 19 June 1966) is an Italian female mountain runner, silver medal at the 1990 World Mountain Running Championships.

== Biography ==
At individual senior level she won 6 medals (1 silver individual in 1990 and 5 with the national team) at the World Mountain Running Championships.

== Team results ==
- World Mountain Running Championships (5 medals)
  - (gold) 1987, 1989 (2)
  - (silver) 1988, 1990 (2)
  - (bronze) 1991 (1)

== National titles ==
- Italian Mountain Running Championships
  - 1987, 1988, 1990 (3)
