= Davide Chicco =

Italian mountain runner

Personal information
- National team: Italy (6 caps in 2004-2007)
- Born: 11 July 1973 (age 52) Como, Italy

Sport
- Country: Italy
- Sport: Mountain running
- Club: G.S. Bernatese

Achievements and titles
- Personal best: Half marathon: 1:08:51 (2003)
Medal record
Mountain running
Event	1st	2nd	3rd
World Championships (individual)	0	0	1
World Championships (team)	3	1	0
European Championships (team)	2	0	0
Total	5	1	1
World Championships
Bronze medal – third place	2005 Wellington	Individual

Davide Chicco (born 11 July 1973) is an Italian male mountain runner, who won a medal at individual senior level at the World Mountain Running Championships.

== See also ==
- Italy at the World Mountain Running Championships
- Italy at the European Mountain Running Championships
