= Dimitile =

Coordinates: 21°11′S 55°30′E

Dimitile is a mountainous area on the island of Réunion, located towards its southern end. The area rises to an altitude of 1,850 m (6,070 ft) above sea level and takes its name from Dimitile, a slave who escaped his masters and sought asylum in the mountains along with a small group who joined his rebellion in the 18th Century.

== See also ==
- Isle de la Reunion
