= Roberto Barbi =

Banned Italian long-distance runner

Personal information
- National team: Italy: 5 caps (1994-1999)
- Born: 25 March 1965 (age 61) Switzerland
- Height: 1.74 m (5 ft 9 in)
- Weight: 56 kg (123 lb)

Sport
- Sport: Athletics
- Event: Marathon
- Club: Cover Avo
- Retired: 2009

Achievements and titles
- Personal bests: Half marathon: 1:01:49 (2000); Marathon: 2:10:12 (2000)

Roberto Barbi (born 25 March 1965), born in Switzerland but Tuscan of Bagni di Lucca, is a former Italian long-distance runner who specialized in the marathon.

He is currently serving a 38 year competition ban for repeated violations of anti-doping regulations. The ban will expire in 2047 when Barbi will be 82 years old.

== Biography ==
He finished twentieth in the marathon event at the 1999 World Championships, and 37th at the 1999 World Half Marathon Championships. He also competed at the 2001 World Championships, but was disqualified.

His personal best marathon time was 2:10:12 hours, achieved in October 2000 in Venice. He had 1:02:09 hours in the half marathon, achieved in April 1999 in Milan.

== Doping ==
In 1996 Barbi tested positive for Ephedrine and was subsequently handed a three-month ban from sports.

In 2001 he tested positive for EPO in a sample collected 30 July, the day he'd arrived in Edmonton for the 2001 World Athletics Championships. His result from the marathon was disqualified, and he received a four-year ban from sports. The ban was later reduced to 25 months, after he cooperated with the Italian anti-doping authorities and police, giving detailed information about his doping. He admitted to have used EPO since 1998.

In 2008 he tested positive for both EPO and Ephedrine. The sample was delivered on 20 July 2008 in an in-competition test in Mende, Lozère. This time he received a suspension for life.

== History of disqualifications ==
Barbi, despite having been repeatedly disqualified, has repeatedly violated the terms of his disqualification by participating in running competitions.

- 1998: 4 mouths for ephedrine
- 2001: 4 years until 31 August 2005 (he will be 40 years old)
- 2009: disqualification for life
- 2009: reduced disqualification until 9 March 2024 (he will be 59 years old)
- 2018: 8 years until 29 July 2032 (he will be 67 years old)
- 2020: 15 years until 28 July 2047 (he will be 82 years old)

== Achievements ==
- All results regarding marathon, unless stated otherwise

Year	Competition	Venue	Position	Notes
Representing Italy
1999	World Championships	Seville, Spain	20th	2:18:13
2001	World Championships	Edmonton, Canada	DSQ (60th)	DSQ
