= Anna Pichrtová =

Czech long-distance runner

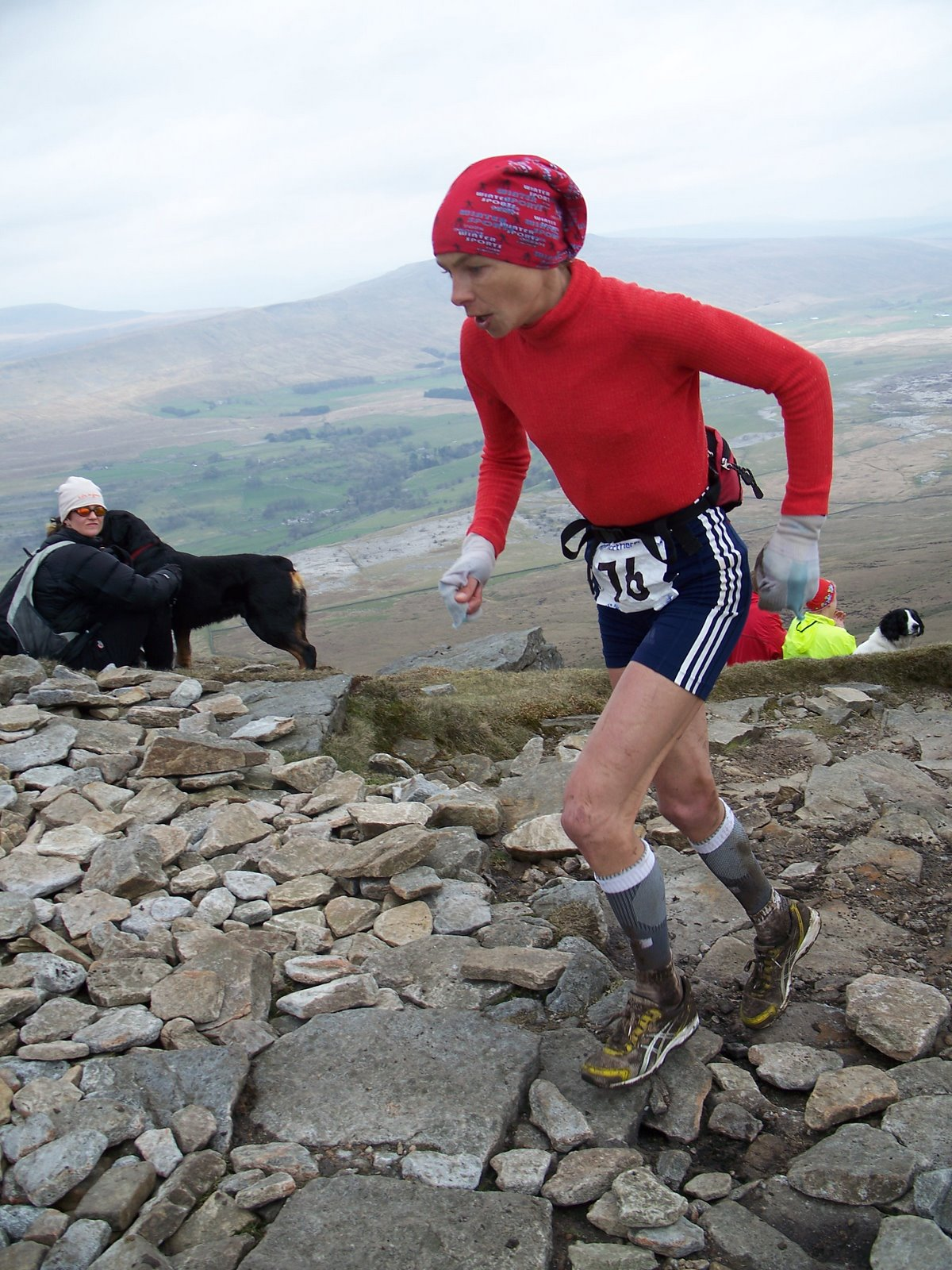

Personal information
- Full name: Anna Pichrtová
- Nationality: Czech
- Born: 19 May 1973 (age 53) Trenčín, Czechoslovakia

Anna Straková, earlier Pichrtová, née Baloghová (born 19 May 1973) is a Czech professional long distance runner. She is a former winner of the World Mountain Running Trophy, as well as a two-time winner of the European Mountain Running Championships.

== Career ==
Pichrtová was one of 41 athletes representing the Czech Republic at the 2002 European Athletics Championships in Munich, Germany. There she finished 11th in the women's marathon with a time of 2:37:39.

In 2004, Pichrtová finished 28th in the women's marathon at the Athens Olympics, with a time of 2:40:58. The same year she won the European Mountain Running Championships for the first time.

The following year she placed 27th at the World Championships in Helsinki, as well as winning the inaugural edition of the Obudu Ranch International Mountain Race in Nigeria. She has also won the Mount Washington Road Race in New Hampshire six times, the Mount Kinabalu Climbathon in Malaysia five times, and in 2006 was victorious at the European Mountain Running Championships in Malé Svatoňovice, the Grand Prix, and the Cinq 4000s at Sierre-Zinal in Switzerland (four times 2006-2009).

In 2007, Pichrtová won the 23rd World Mountain Running Trophy. She twice won the World Long Distance Mountain Running Challenge, in 2008 (Three Peaks Race) and 2009 (Soll-Kaisermarathon).

In late 2006 Pichrtová was injured in a van accident in Nigeria while returning to the Obudu Ranch, and suffered fractures to one arm and both clavicles. After months of physiotherapy she returned to racing in June 2007.

== Personal life ==
She was born Anna Baloghová and was later known by the surname Pichrtová, before changing her name to Anna Straková. She has a daughter named Leila.

== Achievements ==
Year	Competition	Venue	Position	Event	Notes
Representing the Czech Republic
2002	European Championships	Munich, Germany	11th	Marathon	2:37:39
2004	Olympics	Athens, Greece	28th	Marathon	2:40:58
