= Marco De Gasperi =

Italian sportsperson

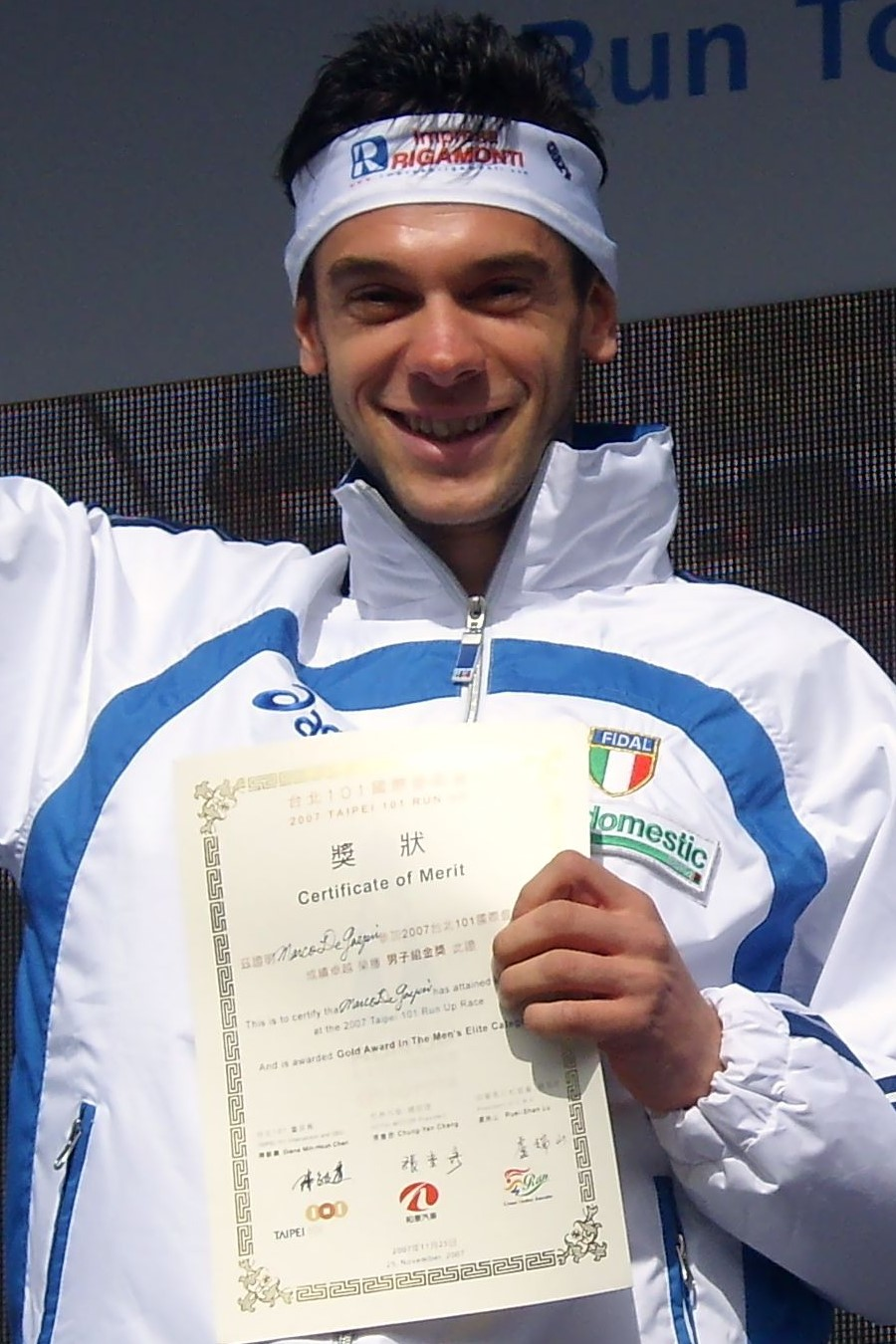

Personal information
- Nationality: Italian
- Born: 5 April 1977 (age 49) Bormio
- Height: 1.71 m (5 ft 7 in)
- Weight: 55 kg (121 lb)

Sport
- Country: Italy
- Sport: Athletics; Mountain running Sky running
- Event(s): Long-distance running Vertical kilometer
- Club: G.S. Forestale

Achievements and titles
- Personal best: Half marathon: 1.05:53 (2012)
Medal record
Mountain running
Event	1st	2nd	3rd
World Championships (individual)	5	0	0
World Championships (team)	11	3	1
World LD Championships (individual)	0	1	0
World LD Championships (team)	1	0	0
European Championships (individual)	1	3	4
European Championships (team)	13	0	0
Total	31	7	5
World Long Distance MR C'hips
Gold medal – first place	2016 Podbrdo	Team
Silver medal – second place	2016 Podbrdo	Individual
Skyrunning
World Championships
Silver medal – second place	2010 Premana	SkyMarathon
European Championships
Gold medal – first place	2007 Poschiavo	SkyRace
Silver medal – second place	2013 Canazei	SkyRace
Bronze medal – third place	2011 Valencia	Vertical Kilometer

Marco De Gasperi (born 5 April 1977) is an Italian male mountain runner, sky runner and long-distance runner.

== Biography ==
He won five gold medals at senior level (from 1997 to 2007) and one at junior level (1996), at the World Mountain Running Championships. At European level he won 5 medals individual (1 gold, 2 silver, 2 bronze) and 6 gold medal with the national team at the European Mountain Running Championships from 2002 to 2008.

His partner is the Italian mountain running champion Elisa Desco. They have two daughters, Lidia (2011) and Cecilia (2017).

== Achievements ==
Year	Competition	Venue	Position	Event	Time	Notes
Mountain running
1997	World championships	(Czech Republic) Malé Svatoňovice	1st	Men's race	54:11	
1999	World championships	(Malaysia) Kinabalu Park	1st	Men's race	54:56	
2001	World championships	(Italy) Arta Terme	1st	Men's race	1:01:05	
2003	World championships	(United States) Girdwood	1st	Men's race	50:29	
2007	World championships	(Switzerland) Ovronnaz	1st	Men's race	51:49	

== World Cup wins ==
Sky running

#	Season	Date	Race	Discipline
1	2002	1 September	Val d'Isère Vertical Kilometer	Vertical
2	2003	12 July	Val d'Isère Vertical Kilometer	Vertical
3	2003	4 October	Mount Kinabalu Climbathon	SkyRace
4	2008	10 August	Course de Sierre-Zinal	SkyRace
5	2010	20 September	Mount Kinabalu Climbathon	SkyRace
6	2011	8 May	Kilomètre Vertical Arles/Tech	Vertical
7	2011	14 August	Sierre-Zinal	SkyRace
8	2012	7 May	Elbrus Vertical Kilometer	Vertical
9	2017	26 August	Matterhorn Ultraks	SkyRace
10	2017	14 October	Limone SkyRace	SkyRace

== National titles ==
- Italian Mountain Running Championships
  - Mountain running: 2002, 2003, 2004 (3)
- Italian Long Distance Mountain Running Championships
  - Long-distance mountain running: 2014
- Italian Vertical Kilometer Championships (FISKY version)
  - Vertical kilometer: 2012

== See also ==
- Italy at the European Mountain Running Championships
- Italy at the World Mountain Running Championships
