= 2015 World Long Distance Mountain Running Championships =

- Host city: Zermatt
- Country: Switzerland
- Events: Individual (men & women); Team (men & women)
- Opening: July 4, 2015
- Closing: July 4, 2015
- Website: wmra.ch

The 2015 World Long Distance Mountain Running Championships (or 2015 World Long Distance MR Championships), was the 12th edition of the global Mountain running competition, World Long Distance Mountain Running Championships, organised by the World Mountain Running Association and was held in Zermatt, Switzerland on 4 July 2015.

== Results ==
=== Men individual (42.2 km/+ 1900 m) ===
Rank	Athlete	Country	Time
1st place, gold medalist(s)	Tommaso Vaccina	Italy	3:01:51.5
2nd place, silver medalist(s)	Andrew Wacker	United States	3:03:51.2
3rd place, bronze medalist(s)	Francesco Puppi	Italy	3:04:14.8
4	Shaban Mustafa	Bulgaria	3:07:12.0
5	Massimo Mei	Italy	3:07:55.4
6	Mitja Kosovelj	Slovenia	3:08:54.6
7	Paul Maticha Michieka	Kenya	3:10:36.1
8	Gerd Frick	Italy	3:11:04.8
9	Thomas Kühlmann	Germany	3:11:25.8
10	Francis Maina Ngare	Kenya	3:12:20.8

=== Women individual ===
Rank	Athlete	Country	Time
1st place, gold medalist(s)	Martina Strähl	SUI	3:21:38.4
2nd place, silver medalist(s)	Aline Camboulives LaVergne	France	3:29:45.8
3rd place, bronze medalist(s)	Catherine Bertone	Italy	3:33:56.6
4	Stevie Kremer	United States	3:35:38.3
5	Daniela Gassmann Bahr	Switzerland	3:36:59.0
6	Jasmin Nunige	SUI	3:38:52.0
7	Ivana Iozzia	Italy	3:39:05.7
8	Julia Bleasdale	United Kingdom	3:40:00.7
9	Conny Berchtold	SUI	3:43:42.1
10	Francesca Iachemet	Italy	3:43:56.4

=== Team ===
==== Men ====
Rank	Country	Time
1st place, gold medalist(s)	Italy; Tommaso Vaccina; Francesco Puppi; Massimo Mei	9h 14' 02"
2nd place, silver medalist(s)	United States; Andrew Wacker; Peter Maksimow; Mario Mendoza	09h 45' 22"
3rd place, bronze medalist(s)	Kenya; Paul Maticha Michieka; Francis Maina Ngare; Isaac Kosgei	9h 53' 30"

==== Women ====
Rank	Country	Time
1st place, gold medalist(s)	Switzerland; Martina Strähl; Daniela Gassmann Bahr; Jasmin Nunige	10h 37' 29"
2nd place, silver medalist(s)	Italy; Catherine Bertone; Ivana Iozzia; Francesca Iachemet	10h 56' 58"
3rd place, bronze medalist(s)	United States; Stevie Kremer; Brandy Erholtz; Megan Kimmel	11h 13' 23"
