= 2008 World Long Distance Mountain Running Challenge =

2008 World Long Distance Mountain Running Championships
- Dates: 24 April
- Host city: Horton in Ribblesdale, United Kingdom
- Level: Senior
- Events: 2

The 2008 World Long Distance Mountain Running Challenge was the fifth edition of the global Mountain running competition, World Long Distance Mountain Running Championships, organised by the World Mountain Running Association.

== Results ==
=== Men individual ===
Rank	Athlete	Country	Time
1st place, gold medalist(s)	Jethro Lennox	Scotland	2h 53' 39"
2nd place, silver medalist(s)	Thomas Owens	England	2h 54' 16"
3rd place, bronze medalist(s)	Mitja Kosovelj	Slovenia	2h 57' 36"
4	Rob Jebb	England	2h 59' 13"
5	Rob Hope	England	2h 59' 51"
6	Ricky Lightfoot	England	3h 00' 25"
7	Karl Gray	England	3h 01' 24"
8	Billy Burns	England	3h 02' 44"
9	Joe Symonds	Scotland	3h 03' 38"
10	Andy Peace	England	3h 04' 47"

=== Women individual ===
Rank	Athlete	Country	Time
1st place, gold medalist(s)	Anna Pichrtová	Czech Republic	3h 14' 43"
2nd place, silver medalist(s)	Angela Mudge	Scotland	3h 20' 53"
3rd place, bronze medalist(s)	Angela Bateup	Australia	3h 25' 33"
4	Anna Frost	New Zealand	3h 26' 13"
5	Sharon Taylor	England	3h 34' 15"
6	Elena Rukhliada	Russia	3h 34' 35"
7	Evgeniya Danilova	Russia	3h 35' 36"
8	Helen Fines	England	3h 38' 42"
9	Fiona Maxwell	Northern Ireland	3h 39' 52"
10	Ekaterina Nechunaeva	Russia	3h 43' 52"
