= 2009 World Long Distance Mountain Running Challenge =

2009 World Long Distance Mountain Running Championships
- Dates: 10 October
- Host city: Söll, Austria
- Level: Senior
- Events: 4

The 2009 World Long Distance Mountain Running Challenge was the sixth edition of the global Mountain running competition, World Long Distance Mountain Running Championships, organised by the World Mountain Running Association.

== Results ==
=== Individual ===
==== Men ====
Rank	Athlete	Country	Time
1st place, gold medalist(s)	Marc Lauenstein	Switzerland	3h 06' 20"
2nd place, silver medalist(s)	Jonathan Wyatt	New Zealand	3h 12' 05"
3rd place, bronze medalist(s)	Ricky Lightfoot	England	3h 14' 05"
4	Raymond Kemboi	Kenya	3h 14' 51"
5	Marco Sturm	Germany	3h 18' 23"
6	Daniel Bett	Kenya	3h 19' 02"
7	Robert Kipkemoi Yegon	Kenya	3h 12' 21"
8	Andy Peace	England	3h 21' 44"
9	Christian Bründlinger	Austria	3h 22' 06"
10	Jethro Lennox	Scotland	3h 22' 14"

==== Women ====
Rank	Athlete	Country	Time
1st place, gold medalist(s)	Anna Pichrtová	Czech Republic	3h 28' 57"
2nd place, silver medalist(s)	Evgeniya Danilova	Russia	3h 29' 23"
3rd place, bronze medalist(s)	Anna Frost	New Zealand	3h 33' 20"
4	Elena Rukhliada	Russia	3h 38' 19"
5	Angela Bateup	Australia	3h 48' 35"
6	Irina Pankovskaya	Russia	3h 48' 55"
7	Vanessa Haverd	Australia	3h 49' 27"
8	Colleen Middleton	Australia	3h 50' 08"
9	Anna Lupton	England	3h 52' 36"
10	Michaela Mertová	Czech Republic	3h 53' 32"

=== Team ===
==== Men ====
Rank	Country	Time
1st place, gold medalist(s)	Kenya; Raymond Kemboi; Daniel Bett; Robert Kipkemoi Yegon	9h 55' 05"
2nd place, silver medalist(s)	England; Ricky Lightfoot; Andy Peace; Morgan Donnelly	9h 58' 16"
3rd place, bronze medalist(s)	Scotland; Jethro Lennox; Alasdair Anthony; Kenneth Richmond	10h 13' 58"

==== Women ====
Rank	Country	Time
1st place, gold medalist(s)	Russia; Evgeniya Danilova; Elena Rukhliada; Irina Pankovskaya	10h 56' 37"
2nd place, silver medalist(s)	Australia; Angela Bateup; Vanessa Haverd; Colleen Middleton	11h 28' 11"
3rd place, bronze medalist(s)	Germany; Alexandra Bott; Britta Müller; Veronika Ulrich	12h 03' 20"
