= 2012 World Long Distance Mountain Running Challenge =

2012 World Long Distance Mountain Running Championships
- Dates: 5 September
- Host city: Interlaken, Switzerland
- Level: Senior
- Events: 4

The 2012 World Long Distance Mountain Running Challenge was the ninth edition of the global Mountain running competition, World Long Distance Mountain Running Championships, organised by the World Mountain Running Association.

== Results ==
=== Individual ===
==== Men ====
Rank	Athlete	Country	Time
1st place, gold medalist(s)	Markus Hohenwarter	Austria	2h 59' 42"
2nd place, silver medalist(s)	Mitja Kosovelj	Slovenia	3h 00' 47"
3rd place, bronze medalist(s)	Hosea Tuei	Kenya	3h 01' 24"
4	Patrick Wieser	Switzerland	3h 03' 11"
5	Sage Canaday	United States	3h 06' 47"
6	Brian MacMahon	Ireland	3h 07' 44"
7	Gerd Frick	Italy	3h 08' 17"
8	Paul Maticha Michieka	Kenya	3h 08' 41"
9	Robbie Simpson	Scotland	3h 21' 10"
10	Marco Sturm	Germany	3h 10' 52"

==== Women ====
Rank	Athlete	Country	Time
1st place, gold medalist(s)	Stevie Kremer	United States	3h 22' 42"
2nd place, silver medalist(s)	Sabine Reiner	Austria	3h 24' 10"
3rd place, bronze medalist(s)	Kim Dobson	United States	3h 26' 58"
4	Aline Camboulives	France	3h 27' 28"
5	Maude Mathys	Switzerland	3h 35' 40"
6	Jasmin Nunige	Switzerland	3h 36' 13"
7	Angela Mudge	Scotland	3h 39' 15"
8	Anita Håkenstad Evertsen	Norway	3h 41' 55"
9	Melody Fairchild	United States	3h 44' 22"
10	Angela Haldimann-Riedo	Switzerland	3h 46' 11"

=== Team ===
==== Men ====
Rank	Country	Time
1st place, gold medalist(s)	Switzerland; Patrick Wieser; Marc Lauenstein; Christian Mathys	9h 32' 11"
2nd place, silver medalist(s)	United States; Sage Canaday; Galen Burrell; Zac Freudenburg	9h 38' 20"
3rd place, bronze medalist(s)	Germany; Marco Sturm; Ulrich Benz; Stefan Hubert	9h 42' 22"

==== Women ====
Rank	Country	Time
1st place, gold medalist(s)	United States; Kim Dobson; Melody Fairchild; Brandy Erholtz	11h 00' 50"
2nd place, silver medalist(s)	Switzerland; Jasmin Nunige; Angela Haldimann-Riedo; Daniela Aeschbacher	11h 09' 53"
3rd place, bronze medalist(s)	Austria; Sabine Reiner; Karin Freitag; Carina Lilge-Leutner	11h 35' 29"
