= 2014 World Long Distance Mountain Running Challenge =

2014 World Long Distance Mountain Running Championships
- Dates: 16 August
- Host city: Manitou Springs, United States
- Level: Senior
- Events: 4

The 2014 World Long Distance Mountain Running Challenge was the 11th edition of the global Mountain running competition, World Long Distance Mountain Running Championships, organised by the World Mountain Running Association.

== Results ==
=== Individual ===
==== Men ====
Rank	Athlete	Country	Time
1st place, gold medalist(s)	Sage Canaday	United States	2h 10' 03"
2nd place, silver medalist(s)	Azerya Teklay	Eritrea	2h 10' 47"
3rd place, bronze medalist(s)	Andy Wacker	United States	2h 11' 39"
4	Eric Blake	United States	2h 12' 15"
5	Joseph Gray	United States	2h 13' 02"
6	Tommaso Vaccina	Italy	2h 13' 59"
7	Jason Delaney	United States	2h 16' 17"
8	Xavier Chevrier	Italy	2h 17' 08"
9	Peter Maksimow	United States	2h 21' 11"
10	Ionut Zinca	Romania	2h 21' 19"

==== Women ====
Rank	Athlete	Country	Time
1st place, gold medalist(s)	Allie McLaughlin	United States	2h 33' 42"
2nd place, silver medalist(s)	Morgan Arritola	United States	2h 35' 39"
3rd place, bronze medalist(s)	Shannon Payne	United States	2h 40' 28"
4	Mateja Kosovelj	Slovenia	2h 42' 41"
5	Stevie Kremer	United States	2h 43' 16"
6	Brandy Erholtz	United States	2h 47' 46"
7	Anna Celińska	Poland	2h 48' 03"
8	Anna Frost	New Zealand	2h 49' 40"
9	Catherine Bertone	Italy	2h 49' 54"
10	Antonella Confortola	Italy	2h 52' 28"

=== Team ===
==== Men ====
Rank	Country	Time
1st place, gold medalist(s)	United States; Sage Canaday; Andy Wacker; Eric Blake	6h 33' 58"
2nd place, silver medalist(s)	Italy; Tommaso Vaccina; Xavier Chevrier; Massimo Mei	6h 55' 36"
3rd place, bronze medalist(s)	Germany; Stefan Hubert; Marco Sturm; Christian Seiler	7h 13' 11"

==== Women ====
Rank	Country	Time
1st place, gold medalist(s)	United States; Allie McLaughlin; Morgan Arritola; Shannon Payne	7h 49' 49"
2nd place, silver medalist(s)	Italy; Catherine Bertone; Antonella Confortola; Ivana Iozzia	8h 36' 48"
3rd place, bronze medalist(s)	Slovenia; Mateja Kosovelj; Maja Peperko; Urša Trobec	8h 54' 35"
