= 2017 World Long Distance Mountain Running Championships =

- Host city: Premana
- Country: Italy
- Events: Individual (men & women); Team (men & women)
- Opening: August 6, 2017
- Closing: August 6, 2017
- Website: wmra.ch

The 2017 World Long Distance Mountain Running Championships (or 2017 World Long Distance MR Championships), was the 14th edition of the global Mountain running competition, World Long Distance Mountain Running Championships, organised by the World Mountain Running Association and was held in Premana, Italy on 6 August 2017.

== Results ==
=== Men individual (32 km/+ 2900 m) ===
Puppi was elected world champion after the doping disqualification imposed on Eritrean Petro Mamu.

Rank	Athlete	Time
1st place, gold medalist(s)	(Italy) Francesco Puppi	03:14:37
2nd place, silver medalist(s)	(Switzerland) Pascal Egli	03:18:13
3rd place, bronze medalist(s)	(United States) Tayte Pollman	03:24:46
4	(Italy) Alessandro Rambaldini	03:24:51
5	(Czech Republic) Robert Krupicka	03:25:40
6	(Italy) Luca Cagnati	03:26:41
7	(Italy) Gil Pintarelli	03:28:45
8	(Poland) Marcin Swierc	03:29:11
9	(France) Didier Zago	03:33:14
10	(Switzerland) Christian Mathys	03:34:34
11	(United States) Mario Mendoza	03:34:34
12	(Czech Republic) Ondřej Fejfar	03:35:12
13	(Romania) Bogdan Damian	03:35:26
14	(Italy) Nicola Spada	03:35:50
15	(United Kingdom) Tom Owens	03:36:23
16	(Romania) Gyorgy Szabolcz	03:37:04
17	(Slovenia) Rok Bratina	03:37:13
18	(Slovenia) Luka Mihelič	03:37:53
19	(Germany) Florian Reichert	03:37:57
20	(Slovenia) Luka Kovačič	03:38:41

=== Women individual (32 km) ===
Rank	Athlete	Country	Time
1st place, gold medalist(s)	Silvia Rampazzo	Italy	3:56:45
2nd place, silver medalist(s)	Kasie Enman	United States	3:57:30
3rd place, bronze medalist(s)	Denisa Dragomir	Romania	3:59:34
4	Petra Tratnik	Slovenia	4:01:15
5	Victoria Wilkinson	United Kingdom	4:01:28
6	Addie Bracy	United States	4:07:20
7	Charlotte Morgan	United Kingdom	4:08:06
8	Ingrid Mutter	Romania	4:09:10
9	Shelley Doucet	Canada	4:11:10
10	Antonella Confortola	Italy	4:11:43
11	Stephanie Christel Jimenez	Italy	4:12:18
12	Katharina Zipser	Austria	4:17:03
13	Lisa Buzzoni	Italy	4:19:00
14	Barbara Bani	Italy	4:19:00
15	Michaela Mertová	Czech Republic	4:20:05
16	Katrine Villumsen	Denmark	4:21:08
17	Anna Straková	Czech Republic	4:23:37
18	Marianne Hogan	Canada	4:24:48
19	Mojca Koligar	Slovenia	4:25:55
20	Kristi Spravzoff	United States	4:28:11

=== Team men ===
Place	Country	Performers	Points
1st place, gold medalist(s)	Italy	Francesco Puppi, Alessandro Rambaldini, Luca Cagnati	2+5+7=14
2nd place, silver medalist(s)	United States	Tayte Pollman, Mario Mendoza, Cole Watson	4+12+23=39
3rd place, bronze medalist(s)	Czech Republic	Robert Krupička, Ondřej Fejfar, Jan Janů	6+13+34=53
4	Romania	Bogdan Damian, Szabolcz Gyorgy, Viorel Palici	14+17+25=56

=== Team women ===
Place	Country	Performers	Points
1st place, gold medalist(s)	Italy	Silvia Rampazzo, Antonella Confortola, Stephanie Christel Jimenez	1+10+11=22
2nd place, silver medalist(s)	United States	Kasie Enman, Addie Bracy, Kristi Spravzoff	2+6+20=28
3rd place, bronze medalist(s)	Romania	Denisa Dragomir, Ingrid Mutter, Iulia Gainariu	3+8+28=39
4	United Kingdom	Victoria Wilkinson, Charlotte Morgan, Annie Conway	5+7+31=43
