= 2016 World Long Distance Mountain Running Championships =

- Host city: Podbrdo
- Country: Slovenia
- Events: Individual (men & women); Team (men & women)
- Opening: June 18, 2016
- Closing: June 18, 2016
- Website: wmra.ch

The 2016 World Long Distance Mountain Running Championships (or 2016 World Long Distance MR Championships), was the 13th edition of the global Mountain running competition, World Long Distance Mountain Running Championships, organised by the World Mountain Running Association and was held in Podbrdo, Slovenia on 18 June 2016.

== Results ==
=== Men individual ===
Rank	Athlete	Country	Time
1st place, gold medalist(s)	Alessandro Rambaldini	Italy	3:44:52
2nd place, silver medalist(s)	Marco de Gasperi	Italy	3:46:12
3rd place, bronze medalist(s)	Mitja Kosovelj	Slovenia	3:46:33
4.	Tom Owens	United Kingdom	3:49:34
5.	Benedikt Hoffmann	Germany	3:50:42
6.	Ricky Lightfoot	United Kingdom	3:53:30
7.	Marcin Swierc	Poland	3:53:32
8.	Lukas Naegele	Germany	3:53:48
9.	Andrew Davies	United Kingdom	3:54:39
10.	Milan Janata	Czech Republic	3:54:43
11.	Mario Mendoza	United States	3:59:58
12.	Karl Gray	United Kingdom	4:00:19
13.	Viorel Palici	Romania	4:00:29
14.	Fabio Ruga	Italy	4:01:15
15.	Matt Shryock	United States	4:01:28
16.	Robert Hope	United Kingdom	4:01:59
17.	Robert Gruber	Austria	4:05:12
18.	Bartosz Gorczyca	Poland	4:11:08
19.	Gasper Bregar	Slovenia	4:11:28
20.	Marco Zanoni	Italy	4:12:24

=== Men team ===
Rank	Country	Athletes	Time
1st place, gold medalist(s)	Italy	Alessandro Rambaldini, Marco de Gasperi, Fabio Ruga	11:32:19
2nd place, silver medalist(s)	United Kingdom	Tom Owens, Ricky Lightfoot, Andrew Davies	11:37:43
3rd place, bronze medalist(s)	Germany	Benedikt Hoffmann, Lukas Naegele, Thomas Kühlmann	11:56:57
4.	United States	Mario Mendoza, Matt Shryock, Peter Maksimow	12:11:11

=== Women individual ===
Rank	Athlete	Country	Time
1st place, gold medalist(s)	Annie Conway	United Kingdom	4:29:01
2nd place, silver medalist(s)	Antonella Confortola	Italy	4:29:58
3rd place, bronze medalist(s)	Lucija Krkoc	Slovenia	4:30:43
4.	Francesca Iachemet	Italy	4:37:37
5.	Nicolette Griffionen	South Africa	4:39:16
6.	Karin Freitag	Austria	4:39:54
7.	Katharina Zipser	Austria	4:40:09
8.	Megan Kimmel	United States	4:40:28
9.	Debora Cardone	Italy	4:40:43
10.	Jana Bratina	Slovenia	4:40:47
11.	Katerina Matrasova	Czech Republic	4:43:27
12.	Annie Jean	Canada	4:44:48
13.	Anita Ortiz	United States	4:44:57
14.	Victoria Wilkinson	United Kingdom	4:45:33
15.	Tina Fischl	Germany	4:47:26
16.	Ajda Radinja	Slovenia	4:48:21
17.	Ana Cufer	Slovenia	4:48:38
18.	Helen Berry	United Kingdom	4:49:28
19.	Barbara Bani	Italy	4:51:30
20.	Marianne Hogan	Canada	4:52:08

=== Women team ===
Rank	Country	Athletes	Time
1st place, gold medalist(s)	Italy	Antonella Confortola, Francesca Iachemet, Debora Cardone	13:48:18
2nd place, silver medalist(s)	Slovenia	Lucija Krkoc, Jana Bratina, Ajda Radinja	13:59:51
3rd place, bronze medalist(s)	United Kingdom	Annie Conway, Victoria Wilkinson, Helen Berry	14:04:02
4.	United States	Megan Kimmel, Anita Ortiz, Kristina Pattison	14:24:59
