= 2005 World Long Distance Mountain Running Challenge =

2005 World Long Distance Mountain Running Championships
- Dates: 27 July
- Host city: Cauterets, France
- Level: Senior
- Events: 2

The 2005 World Long Distance Mountain Running Challenge was the second edition of the global Mountain running competition, World Long Distance Mountain Running Championships, organised by the World Mountain Running Association.

== Results ==
=== Men individual ===
Rank	Athlete	Country	Time
1st place, gold medalist(s)	Helmut Schiessl	Germany	3h 59' 47"
2nd place, silver medalist(s)	Anton Vencelj	Slovenia	4h 00' 24"
3rd place, bronze medalist(s)	Daniel Bolt	Switzerland	4h 05' 20"
4	Frédéric Frezoul	France	4h 06' 12"
5	Christophe Cazau	France	4h 11' 21"
6	Wolfgang Zingl	Austria	4h 13' 34"
7	Samuel Bonaudo	France	4h 14' 42"
8	Paul Sichermann	Germany	4h 16' 12"
9	Claude Escots	France	4h 22' 23"
10	Christophe Le Saux	France	4h 26' 16"

=== Women individual ===
Rank	Athlete	Country	Time
1st place, gold medalist(s)	Emma Murray	Australia	4h 37' 29"
2nd place, silver medalist(s)	Marion Kapuscinski	Austria	4h 55' 52"
3rd place, bronze medalist(s)	Isabelle Guillot	France	5h 08' 41"
4	Danielle Capro	France	5h 18' 14"
5	Mateja Šušteršič	Slovenia	5h 25' 39"
6	Yvonne Radondy	France	5h 29' 30"
7	Pascale Fouques	France	5h 31' 57"
8	Myriam Tonon-Domecq	France	5h 39' 11"
9	Lara Klaassen	Belgium	5h 49' 12"
10	Françoise Bersans	France	6h 04' 16"
