= 2004 World Long Distance Mountain Running Challenge =

2004 World Long Distance Mountain Running Championships
- Dates: 3 August
- Host city: Zinal, Switzerland
- Level: Senior
- Events: 2

The 2004 World Long Distance Mountain Running Challenge was the first edition of the global Mountain running competition, World Long Distance Mountain Running Championships, organised by the World Mountain Running Association.

== Results ==
=== Men individual ===
Rank	Athlete	Country	Time
1st place, gold medalist(s)	Ricardo Mejía	Mexico	2h 34' 35"
2nd place, silver medalist(s)	Helmut Schiessl	Germany	2h 36' 06"
3rd place, bronze medalist(s)	Billy Burns	England	2h 39' 03"
4	Tarcis Ançay	Switzerland	2h 39' 05"
5	Sébastien Epiney	Switzerland	2h 40' 07"
6	Paul Low	United States	2h 40' 55"
7	Jean-Yves Rey	Switzerland	2h 41' 39"
8	John Brown	England	2h 42' 42"
9	Tim Short	England	2h 43' 37"
10	Saúl Padua	Colombia	2h 45' 29"

=== Women individual ===
Rank	Athlete	Country	Time
1st place, gold medalist(s)	Angéline Joly	Switzerland	3h 09' 22"
2nd place, silver medalist(s)	Maria Eugenia Rodriguez	Colombia	3h 10' 53"
3rd place, bronze medalist(s)	Isabelle Guillot	France	3h 12' 18"
4	Nathalie Etzensperger	Switzerland	3h 14' 28"
5	Claudia Riem	Switzerland	3h 14' 55"
6	Vera Soukhova	Russia	3h 16' 30"
7	Kelli Lusk	United States	3h 30' 43"
8	Catherine Mabillard	Switzerland	3h 32' 22"
9	Sandra Held	Switzerland	3h 36' 54"
10	Birgit Lennartz	Germany	3h 38' 10"
