= 2010 World Long Distance Mountain Running Challenge =

2010 World Long Distance Mountain Running Championships
- Dates: 21 August
- Host city: Manitou Springs, United States
- Level: Senior
- Events: 4

The 2010 World Long Distance Mountain Running Challenge was the seventh edition of the global Mountain running competition, World Long Distance Mountain Running Championships, organised by the World Mountain Running Association.

== Results ==
=== Individual ===
==== Men ====
Rank	Athlete	Country	Time
1st place, gold medalist(s)	Glenn Randall	United States	2h 09' 28"
2nd place, silver medalist(s)	Marc Lauenstein	Switzerland	2h 12' 19"
3rd place, bronze medalist(s)	Rickey Gates	United States	2h 16' 44"
4	Ryan Hafer	United States	2h 20' 04"
5	Alex Nichols	United States	2h 20' 57"
6	Andy Peace	England	2h 22' 25"
7	Morgan Donnelly	England	2h 23' 05"
8	Peter Maksimow	United States	2h 26' 39"
9	Galen Burrell	United States	2h 26' 55"
10	Miguel Ángel López	Mexico	2h 27' 52"

==== Women ====
Rank	Athlete	Country	Time
1st place, gold medalist(s)	Brandy Erholtz	United States	2h 41' 38"
2nd place, silver medalist(s)	Kim Dobson	United States	2h 41' 51"
3rd place, bronze medalist(s)	Anna Frost	New Zealand	2h 42' 46"
4	Keri Nelson	United States	2h 46' 19"
5	Anna Lupton	England	2h 46' 36"
6	Katherine Koski	United States	2h 46' 53"
7	Victoria Wilkinson	England	2h 48' 46"
8	Ashlee Nelson	United States	4h 26' 49"
9	Claire Gordon	Scotland	2h 53' 50"
10	Anja Carlsohn	Germany	2h 54' 33"

=== Team ===
==== Men ====
Rank	Country	Time
1st place, gold medalist(s)	United States; Rickey Gates; Ryan Hafer; Tommy Manning	7h 08' 18"
2nd place, silver medalist(s)	England; Andy Peace; Morgan Donnelly; John Brown	7h 18' 02"
3rd place, bronze medalist(s)	Germany; Timo Zeiler; Marco Sturm; Ulrich Benz	7h 39' 57"

==== Women ====
Rank	Country	Time
1st place, gold medalist(s)	United States; Brandy Erholtz; Megan Kimmel; Lisa Goldsmith	8h 41' 15"
2nd place, silver medalist(s)	Germany; Anja Carlsohn; Diane Lehmann; Kerstin Straub	9h 02' 43"
3rd place, bronze medalist(s)	Scotland; Claire Gordon; Fiona Maxwell; Iona Robertson	9h 31' 06"
