= 2019 World Long Distance Mountain Running Championships =

- Dates: 16 November
- Host city: Villa La Angostura, Argentina
- Level: Senior
- Events: 4

The 2019 World Long Distance Mountain Running Challenge was the 16th edition of the global Mountain running competition, World Long Distance Mountain Running Championships, organised by the World Mountain Running Association.

The 2019 World Mountain Running Championships was disputed in the same place the day before.

== Results ==
=== Individual ===
==== Men ====
Rank	Athlete	Country	Time
1st place, gold medalist(s)	Jim Walmsley	United States	3h 12' 16"
2nd place, silver medalist(s)	Francesco Puppi	Italy	3h 13' 04"
3rd place, bronze medalist(s)	Oriol Cardona Coll	Spain	3h 20' 24"
4	Jonathan Albon	United Kingdom	3h 22' 10"
5	Andreu Simon	Spain	3h 25' 00"
6	Hayden Hawks	United States	3h 26' 05"
7	Antonio Martínez Pérez	Spain	3h 27' 32"
8	Gabriele Bacchion	Italy	3h 28' 18"
9	Nicolas Martin	France	3h 28' 38"
10	David Sinclair	United States	3h 29' 14"

==== Women ====
Rank	Athlete	Country	Time
1st place, gold medalist(s)	Cristina Simion	Romania	3h 49' 57"
2nd place, silver medalist(s)	Adeline Roche	France	3h 51' 56"
3rd place, bronze medalist(s)	Blandine L'Hirondel	France	3h 52' 07"
4	Silvia Rampazzo	Italy	3h 56' 02"
5	Sheila Avilés	Spain	3h 56' 19"
6	Ainhoa Sanz	Spain	3h 57' 04"
7	Charlotte Morgan	United Kingdom	3h 58' 54"
8	Denisa Dragomir	Romania	3h 59' 27"
9	Elisabet Gordon	Spain	4h 01' 05"
10	Emily Schmitz	United States	4h 01' 30"

=== Team ===
==== Men ====
Rank	Country	Points
1st place, gold medalist(s)	Spain; Oriol Cardona Coll; Andreu Simon; Antonio Martínez Pérez	15
2nd place, silver medalist(s)	United States; Jim Walmsley; Hayden Hawks; David Sinclair	17
3rd place, bronze medalist(s)	Italy; Francesco Puppi; Gabriele Bacchion; Luca Cagnati	27

==== Women ====
Rank	Country	Points
1st place, gold medalist(s)	France; Adeline Roche; Blandine L'Hirondel; Sarah Vieuille	17
2nd place, silver medalist(s)	Spain; Sheila Avilés; Ainhoa Sanz; Elisabet Gordon	20
3rd place, bronze medalist(s)	Romania; Cristina Simion; Denisa Dragomir; Monica Madalina Florea	27

== See also ==
- 2019 World Mountain Running Championships
