= 2011 World Long Distance Mountain Running Challenge =

2011 World Long Distance Mountain Running Championships
- Dates: 8 June
- Host city: Podbrdo, Slovenia
- Level: Senior
- Events: 4

The 2011 World Long Distance Mountain Running Challenge was the eighth edition of the global Mountain running competition, World Long Distance Mountain Running Championships, organised by the World Mountain Running Association.

== Results ==
=== Individual ===
==== Men ====
Rank	Athlete	Country	Time
1st place, gold medalist(s)	Mitja Kosovelj	Slovenia	3h 22' 32"
2nd place, silver medalist(s)	Thomas Owens	Scotland	3h 26' 59"
3rd place, bronze medalist(s)	Robbie Simpson	Scotland	3h 29' 05"
4	Jethro Lennox	Scotland	3h 33' 21"
5	Ralf Birchmeier	Switzerland	3h 35' 12"
6	Petr Pechek	Czech Republic	3h 35' 51"
7	Oliver Johnson	England	3h 38' 16"
8	Andrew Davies	Wales	3h 38' 30"
9	Graham Pearce	England	3h 38' 37"
10	Yuriy Chechun	Russia	3h 40' 32"

==== Women ====
Rank	Athlete	Country	Time
1st place, gold medalist(s)	Philippa Maddams	England	4h 08' 46"
2nd place, silver medalist(s)	Karen Alexander	Ireland	4h 16' 21"
3rd place, bronze medalist(s)	Helen Fines	England	4h 19' 14"
4	Irina Pankovskaya	Russia	4h 21' 25"
5	Andrea Rowlands	Wales	4h 24' 08"
6	Anna Celińska	Poland	4h 24' 40"
7	Nigina Khaitova	Russia	4h 26' 25"
8	Anna Lupton	England	4h 26' 49"
9	Adéla Esentierová	Czech Republic	4h 27' 45"
10	Fiona Maxwell	Scotland	4h 29' 46"

=== Team ===
==== Men ====
Rank	Country	Time
1st place, gold medalist(s)	Scotland; Thomas Owens; Robbie Simpson; Jethro Lennox	10h 29' 25"
2nd place, silver medalist(s)	Slovenia; Mitja Kosovelj; Peter Lamovec; Marjan Zupančič	10h 57' 20"
3rd place, bronze medalist(s)	England; Oliver Johnson; Graham Pearce; Benjamin Abdelnoor	10h 58' 46"

==== Women ====
Rank	Country	Time
1st place, gold medalist(s)	England; Philippa Maddams; Helen Fines; Anna Lupton	12h 54' 49"
2nd place, silver medalist(s)	Russia; Irina Pankovskaya; Nigina Khaitova; Yulia Khazova	13h 24' 37"
3rd place, bronze medalist(s)	Scotland; Fiona Maxwell; Andrea Priestley; Claire Gordon	13h 41' 07"
