= 2018 World Long Distance Mountain Running Championships =

- Dates: 24 June
- Host city: Karpacz, Poland
- Level: Senior
- Events: 4

The 2018 World Long Distance Mountain Running Challenge was the 15th edition of the global Mountain running competition, World Long Distance Mountain Running Championships, organised by the World Mountain Running Association.

== Results ==
=== Individual ===
==== Men ====
Rank	Athlete	Country	Time
1st place, gold medalist(s)	Alessandro Rambaldini	Italy	2h 39' 18"
2nd place, silver medalist(s)	Robert Krupička	Czech Republic	2h 40' 55"
3rd place, bronze medalist(s)	Joseph Gray	United States	2h 41' 02"
4	Jiří Čípa	Czech Republic	2h 44' 27"
5	Andy Wacker	United States	2h 45' 21"
6	Jonathan Schmid	Switzerland	2h 45' 34"
7	Ionut Zinca	Romania	2h 46' 06"
8	Murray Strain	United Kingdom	2h 46' 29"
9	Ondřej Fejfar	Czech Republic	2h 46' 50"
10	Anthony Costales	United States	2h 47' 17"

==== Women ====
Rank	Athlete	Country	Time
1st place, gold medalist(s)	Charlotte Morgan	United Kingdom	3h 08' 24"
2nd place, silver medalist(s)	Dominika Stelmach	Poland	3h 08' 46"
3rd place, bronze medalist(s)	Silvia Rampazzo	Italy	3h 10' 32"
4	Denisa Ionela Dragomir	Romania	3h 12' 11"
5	Victoria Wilkinson	United Kingdom	3h 12' 11"
6	Sandra Koblmüller	Austria	3h 19' 23"
7	Addie Bracy	United States	3h 19' 44"
8	Ashley Brasovan	United States	3h 19' 44"
9	Zuzana Krchová	Czech Republic	3h 20' 58"
10	Katharina Zipser	Austria	3h 21' 44"

=== Team ===
==== Men ====
Rank	Country	Points
1st place, gold medalist(s)	Czech Republic; Robert Krupička; Jiří Čípa; Ondřej Fejfar	15
2nd place, silver medalist(s)	United States; Joseph Gray; Andy Wacker; Anthony Costales	18
3rd place, bronze medalist(s)	Italy; Alessandro Rambaldini; Daniele De Colo; Emanuele Manzi	40

==== Women ====
Rank	Country	Points
1st place, gold medalist(s)	Austria; Sandra Koblmüller; Katharina Zipser; Karin Freitag	28
2nd place, silver medalist(s)	United Kingdom; Charlotte Morgan; Victoria Wilkinson; Nichola Jackson	30
3rd place, bronze medalist(s)	Romania; Denisa Ionela Dragomir; Andreea Piscu; Ingrid Mutter	31
