= 2013 World Long Distance Mountain Running Challenge =

Mountain running competition in Poland

2013 World Long Distance Mountain Running Championships
- Host city: Szklarska Poreba
- Country: Poland
- Events: Individual (men & women); Team (men & women)
- Opening: August 3, 2013
- Closing: August 3, 2013
- Website: wmra.ch

The 2013 World Long Distance Mountain Running Championships (or 2013 World Long Distance MR Championships), was the tenth edition of the global Mountain running competition, World Long Distance Mountain Running Championships, organised by the World Mountain Running Association and was held in Szklarska Poreba, Poland on 3 August 2013.

== Results ==
=== Men individual ===
Rank	Athlete	Country	Time
1st place, gold medalist(s)	Mitja Kosovelj	Slovenia	3:07:36
2nd place, silver medalist(s)	Andrew Davies	Wales	3:13:39
3rd place, bronze medalist(s)	Ionut Zinca	Romania	3:14:00
4	Emanuele Manzi	Italy	3:16:01
5	Zac Freudenburg	United States	3:16:06
6	Vladimir Kalinin	Russia	3:18:34
7	Petr Pechek	Czech Republic	3:19:20
8	Tomasso Vaccina	Italy	3:20:33
9	Marcin Świerc	Poland	3:21:10
10	Robert Gruber	Austria	3:23:02

=== Women individual ===
Rank	Athlete	Country	Time
1st place, gold medalist(s)	Antonella Confortola	Italy	3:44:51
2nd place, silver medalist(s)	Ornella Ferrara	Italy	3:48:41
3rd place, bronze medalist(s)	Anna Celińska	Poland	3:51:21
4	Claire Gordon	Scotland	3:56:34
5	Anna Lupton	England	3:57:53
6	Helen Fines	England	3:58:33
7	Helen Bonsor	Scotland	4:01:32
8	Ivana Iozzia	Italy	4:01:58
9	Yulia Smirnova	Russia	4:04:29
10	Katerina Matrasova	Czech Republic	4:04:47

=== Team ===
==== Men ====
Rank	Country	Time
1st place, gold medalist(s)	Italy; Emanuele Manzi; Tomasso Vaccina; Massimiliano Zanaboni	10h 06' 47"
2nd place, silver medalist(s)	Czech Republic; Petr Pechek; Tom Ondracek; Jan Mrazek	10h 15' 12"
3rd place, bronze medalist(s)	Wales; Andrew Davies; Tim Davies; Richard Roberts	10h 31' 08"

==== Women ====
Rank	Country	Time
1st place, gold medalist(s)	Italy; Antonella Confortola; Ornella Ferrara; Ivana Iozzia	11h 35' 29"
2nd place, silver medalist(s)	Scotland; Claire Gordon; Helen Bonsor; Jasmin Paris	12h 03' 38"
3rd place, bronze medalist(s)	England; Anna Lupton; Helen Fines; Holly Rush	12h 07' 01"
