= 2006 World Long Distance Mountain Running Challenge =

2006 World Long Distance Mountain Running Championships
- Dates: 20 August
- Host city: Manitou Springs, United States
- Level: Senior
- Events: 2

The 2006 World Long Distance Mountain Running Challenge was the third edition of the global Mountain running competition, World Long Distance Mountain Running Championships, organised by the World Mountain Running Association.

== Results ==
=== Men individual ===
Rank	Athlete	Country	Time
1st place, gold medalist(s)	Matt Carpenter	United States	3h 33' 07"
2nd place, silver medalist(s)	Galen Burrell	United States	3h 45' 41"
3rd place, bronze medalist(s)	Zac Freudenburg	United States	3h 54' 01"
4	Ulrich Steidl	Germany	3h 56' 37"
5	Miguel Ángel López	Mexico	4h 00' 13"
6	Anton Vencelj	Slovenia	4h 06' 59"
7	Bernie Boettcher	United States	4h 08' 09"
8	Daniel Bolt	Switzerland	4h 12' 18"
9	Paul Koch	United States	4h 14' 13"
10	Erin Hutchinson	United States	4h 14' 51"

=== Women individual ===
Rank	Athlete	Country	Time
1st place, gold medalist(s)	Emma Murray	Australia	4h 21' 09"
2nd place, silver medalist(s)	Danelle Ballengee	United States	4h 25' 44"
3rd place, bronze medalist(s)	Keri Nelson	United States	4h 51' 53"
4	Cheryl Stephenson	United States	4h 57' 54"
5	Sara Evans	United States	4h 58' 22"
6	Lisa Ledet	England	4h 58' 43"
7	Salynda Fleury	United States	5h 03' 14"
8	Jennifer Leppert	United States	5h 03' 30"
9	Jane Tunnadine	United States	5h 04' 15"
10	Karen Brennan	United States	5h 14' 37"
