= 2007 World Long Distance Mountain Running Challenge =

2007 World Long Distance Mountain Running Championships
- Dates: 7 September
- Host city: Interlaken, Switzerland
- Level: Senior
- Events: 2

The 2007 World Long Distance Mountain Running Challenge was the fourth edition of the global Mountain running competition, World Long Distance Mountain Running Championships, organised by the World Mountain Running Association.

== Results ==
=== Men individual ===
Rank	Athlete	Country	Time
1st place, gold medalist(s)	Jonathan Wyatt	New Zealand	2h 55' 32"
2nd place, silver medalist(s)	Hermann Achmüller	Italy	2h 58' 35"
3rd place, bronze medalist(s)	Gerd Frick	Italy	3h 02' 41"
4	Ranulfo Sánchez	Mexico	3h 05' 56"
5	Galen Burrell	United States	3h 11' 05"
6	Serguej Kaledine	Russia	3h 11' 28"
7	Marc Lauenstein	Switzerland	3h 13' 41"
8	Zac Freudenburg	United States	3h 14' 58"
9	Sergiy Oksenyuk	Ukraine	3h 15' 28"
10	Urs Jenzer	Switzerland	3h 15' 47"

=== Women individual ===
Rank	Athlete	Country	Time
1st place, gold medalist(s)	Anita Håkenstad Evertsen	Norway	3h 23' 05"
2nd place, silver medalist(s)	Elina Kaledina	Russia	3h 31' 16"
3rd place, bronze medalist(s)	Jeanna Malkova	Russia	3h 36' 43"
4	Anja Carlsohn	Germany	3h 36' 59"
5	Claudia Landolt	Switzerland	3h 37' 58"
6	Elizabeth Hawker	England	3h 40' 00"
7	Corinne Zeller	Switzerland	3h 41' 12"
8	Marie-Luce Romanens	Switzerland	3h 42' 51"
9	Britta Müller	Germany	3h 45' 22"
10	Daniela Wyss	Switzerland	3h 46' 27"
