= 2019 World Mountain Running Championships =

- Dates: 15 November
- Host city: Villa La Angostura, Argentina
- Level: Senior and Junior
- Events: 8

The 2019 World Mountain Running Challenge was the 35th edition of the global Mountain running competition, World Mountain Running Championships, organised by the World Mountain Running Association.

The 2019 World Long Distance Mountain Running Championships was disputed in the same place the day after.

== Senior ==
=== Individual ===
==== Men ====
Distance 14.7 km, difference in height 750m, participants 77.

Rank	Athlete	Country	Time
1st place, gold medalist(s)	Joseph Gray	United States	1:05:13
Silver medal	Cesare Maestri	Italy	1:05:21
Bronze medal	Marek Chrascina	Czech Republic	1:05:57
4	Jan Janu	Czech Republic	1:06:00
5	Alexandre Fine	France	1:06:07
6	Manuel Innerhofer	Austria	1:06:15
7	Andrew Douglas	United Kingdom	1:06:22
8	Jacob Adkin	United Kingdom	1:06:33
9	Xavier Chevrier	Italy	1:07:21
10	Jachym Kovar	Czech Republic	1:07:27
11	Maykol Velasque Chiclla	Peru	1:07:31
12	David Sinclair	United States	1:07:38
13	Maximilien Drion du Chapois	Belgium	1:07:43
14	Julien Rancon	France	1:07:43
15	Timotej Becan	Slovenia	1:08:26
16	Misael Suazo Cuba	Peru	1:08:37
17	Jeffrey Archer	Canada	1:08:43
18	Richard Sosa	Uruguay	1:08:53
19	Hans-Peter Innerhofer	Austria	1:08:55
20	Karl Augsten	Canada	1:08:59

==== Women ====
Distance 14.7 km, difference in height 750m, participants 61.

Rank	Athlete	Country	Time
1st place, gold medalist(s)	Grayson Murphy	United States	1:15:20
Silver medal	Élise Poncet	France	1:15:41
Bronze medal	Phillipa Williams	United Kingdom	1:16:45
4	Adela Stranska	Czech Republic	1:17:53
5	Lizaida Thalia Valdivia Magarino	Peru	1:18:10
6	Christel Dewalle	France	1:18:16
7	Anaïs Sabrié	France	1:18:30
8	Elisa Sortini	Italy	1:18:57
9	Emily Collinge	United Kingdom	1:19:03
10	Tereza Hrochová	Czech Republic	1:19:39
11	Pavla Schorná Matyasová	Czech Republic	1:19:39
12	Sarah McCormack	Ireland	1:20:43
13	Chiara Mainetti	Argentina	1:21:02
14	Gaia Colling	Italy	1:21:27
15	Alice Gaggi	Italy	1:21:37
16	Rina Ruth Cjuro Merma	Peru	1:21:39
17	Kimber Mattox	United States	1:21:40
18	Ana Cufer	Slovenia	1:21:47
19	Sarah Tunstall	United Kingdom	1:21:48
20	Lucy Basilio Perez	Peru	1:21:51

=== Team ===
==== Men ====
Rank	Country	Points
1st place, gold medalist(s)	Czech Republic; Marek Chrascina; Jan Janu; Jachym Kovar; Tomas Lichy	3+4+1ּ0=17
2nd place, silver medalist(s)	United States; Joseph Gray; David Sinclair; Andy Wacker; Seth Demoor	1+12+21=34
3rd place, bronze medalist(s)	Italy; Cesare Maestri; Xavier Chevrier; Alex Baldaccini; Nadir Cavagna	2+9+24=35
4	France; Alexandre Fine; Julien Rancon; Fabien Demure; Didier Zago	5+14+22=41

==== Women ====
Rank	Country	Points
1st place, gold medalist(s)	France; Élise Poncet; Christel Dewalle; Anaïs Sabrié; Mathilde Sagnes	2+6+7=15
2nd place, silver medalist(s)	Czech Republic; Adela Stranska; Tereza Hrochova; Pavla Schorna Matyasova; Hana Svestkova Struzkova	4+10+11=25
3rd place, bronze medalist(s)	United Kingdom; Philippa Williams; Emily Collinge; Sarah Tunstall; Heidi Davies	3+9+19=31
4	Italy; Elisa Sortini; Gaia Colling; Alice Gaggi; Alessa Scaini	8+14+15=37

== Junior ==
=== Individual ===
==== Men ====
Distance 7.6km, total ascent of 395 m total descent of 475 m, participants 43.

Rank	Athlete	Country	Time
1st place, gold medalist(s)	Joseph Dugdale	United Kingdom	32:44
Silver medal	Sebih Bahar	Turkey	32:50
Bronze medal	Yael Paniagua Morales	Mexico	32:52
4	Matthew Mackay	United Kingdom	32:58
5	Matthew Knowles	United Kingdom	33:01
6	Tyman Smart	United States	33:09
7	Toby Gualter	New Zealand	33:10
8	Cesar Daniel Gomez Ponce	Mexico	33:13
9	Remi Lonchampt	France	33:22
10	Marco Zoldan	Italy	33:25
11	Sinan Aksoy	Turkey	33:26
12	Joe Hudson	United Kingdom	33:29
13	Luca Merli	Italy	33:35
14	Theo Dancer	France	33:42
15	Massimiliano Berti	Italy	33:44
16	Samet Demir	Turkey	33:47
17	Benjamin Vrbovsky	Czech Republic	34:10
18	Robin Veyre	France	34:15
19	Borek Pozar	Czech Republic	34:22
20	David Cardenas	United States	34:38

==== Women ====
Distance 7.6km, total ascent of 395 m total descent of 475 m, participants 33.

Rank	Athlete	Country	Time
1st place, gold medalist(s)	Angela Mattevi	Italy	37:12
Silver medal	Barbora Havlíčková	Czech Republic	37:56
Bronze medal	Jade Rodriguez	France	38:48
4	Alena Matejakova	Czech Republic	38:53
5	Ruken Tek	Turkey	39:04
6	Nusa Mali	Slovenia	39:35
7	Giovanna Selva	Italy	39:42
8	Samantha Blair	United States	39:49
9	Anna Arnaudo	Italy	39:52
10	Dilek Ozturk	Turkey	39:58
11	Ezgi Kaya	Turkey	40:02
12	Emma Berti	France	40:06
13	Hortense Grillier	France	40:11
14	Eden O'Dea	United Kingdom	40:12
15	Joslin Blair	United States	40:30
16	Eve Pannone	United Kingdom	40:58
17	Spela Gonza	Slovenia	41:02
18	Cecile Calandry	France	41:18
19	Elisa Pastorelli	Italy	41:25
20	Shelly Schenk	Switzerland	41:38

=== Team ===
==== Men ====
Rank	Country	Points
1st place, gold medalist(s)	United Kingdom; Joseph Dugdale; Matthew Mackay; Matthew Knowles; Joe Hudson	1+4+5=10
2nd place, silver medalist(s)	Turkey; Sebih Bahar; Sinan Aksoy; Samet Demir; Mahsum Deger	2+11+16=29
3rd place, bronze medalist(s)	Italy; Marco Zoldan; Luca Merli; Massimiliano Berti; Giacomo Bruno	10+13+15=38
4	Mexico; Yael Paniagua Morales; Cesar Daniel Gomez Ponce; Alexis Omar Garcia Ortega	3+8+28=39

==== Women ====
Rank	Country	Points
1st place, gold medalist(s)	Italy; Angela Mattevi; Giovanna Selva; Anna Arnaudo; Elisa Pastorelli	1+7+9=17
2nd place, silver medalist(s)	Turkey; Ruken Tek; Dilek Ozturk; Ezgi Kaya; Semanur Kanat	5+10+11=26
3rd place, bronze medalist(s)	Czech Republic; Barbora Havlíčková; Alena Matejakova; Anezka Sevcikova; Gabriela Veigertova	2+4+21=27
4	France; Jade Rodriguez; Emma Berti; Hortense Grillier; Cecile Calandry	3+12+13=28

== See also ==
- 2019 World Long Distance Mountain Running Championships
