= Francesco Puppi =

Italian runner

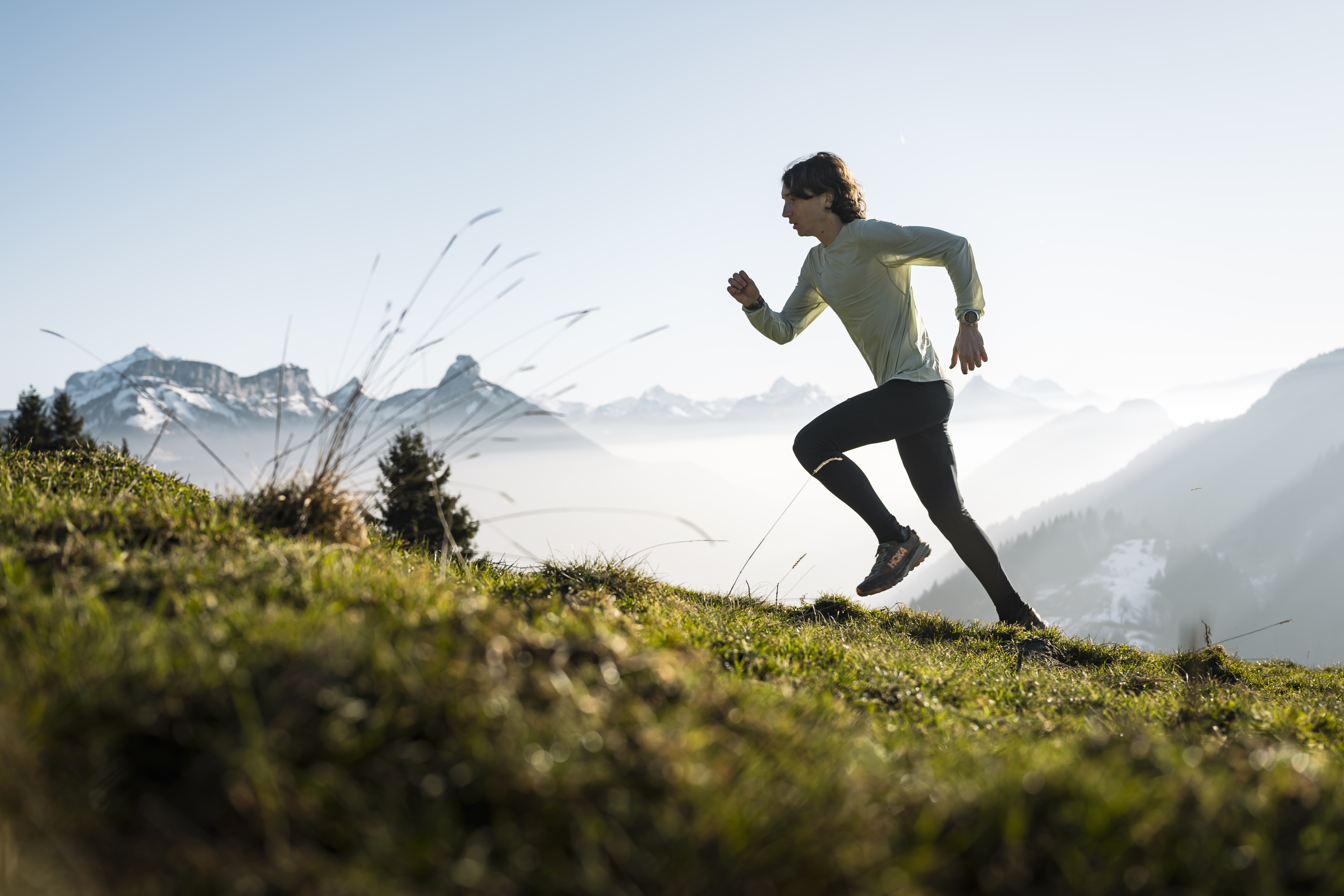

Personal information
- Nationality: Italian
- Born: 26 January 1992 (age 34) Como

Sport
- Country: Italy
- Sport: Trail running Mountain running Ultra running
- Event(s): ultramarathon trail running
- Club: Hoka
- Coached by: Tito Tiberti
Medal record
Mountain running
Event	1st	2nd	3rd
World Championships (individual)	0	0	0
World Championships (team)	0	2	0
World LD Championships (individual)	1	1	1
World LD Championships (team)	2	0	1
European Championships (individual)	0	0	1
European Championships (team)	1	1	0
Total	4	4	3
World Mountain Running Championships
Silver medal – second place	2016 Sapareva-Banja	Team
Silver medal – second place	2018 Canillo	Team
World Long Distance MR C'hips
Gold medal – first place	2017 Premana	Individual
Gold medal – first place	2015 Zermatt	Team
Gold medal – first place	2017 Premana	Team
Silver medal – second place	2019 Villa La Angostura	Individual
Bronze medal – third place	2015 Zermatt	Individual
Bronze medal – third place	2019 Villa La Angostura	Team

Francesco Puppi (born 26 January 1992) is an Italian male trail runner and ultra runner, world champion at 2017 World Long Distance Mountain Running Championships.

== Biography ==
The 2017 World Long Distance Mountain Running Championships was rewritten and the gold medal was dropped by Eritrean Petro Mamu, disqualified for doping, and was assigned to the Italian Francesco Puppi.

== Achievements ==
Year	Competition	Venue	Position	Event	Time	Notes
2015	World Long Distance MR Championships	(Switzerland) Zermatt	3rd	Men's race (42.2 km/+ 1900 m)	3:01:51	
2015	World Long Distance MR Championships	(Switzerland) Zermatt	1st	Team race	9:14:02	
2017	World Long Distance MR Championships	(Italy) Premana	1st	Men's race (32 km/+ 2900 m)	3:14:37	
2017	World Long Distance MR Championships	(Italy) Premana	1st	Team race	14 pts	

== National titles ==
- Italian Vertical Kilometer Championships
  - Vertical kilometer: 2015

== See also ==
- Italy at the European Mountain Running Championships
- Italy at the World Mountain Running Championships
