= Oliver Johnson =

Oliver Johnson may refer to:

- Oliver Johnston (actor) (1888-1966), British actor
- Oliver Johnson (writer) (1809–1889)
- Oliver Johnson (drummer), jazz drummer, frequent collaborator of Takashi Kako
- Oliver Johnson (runner), British runner; see 2011 World Long Distance Mountain Running Challenge

== See also ==
- Oliver Johnson's Woods Historic District, Indianapolis, Indiana, U.S.
- Olive M. Johnson (1872–1952), American socialist, newspaper editor and political activist
- Ollie Johnson (disambiguation)
- Oliver Johnston (disambiguation)
