= Ornella Ferrara =

Italian long-distance runner

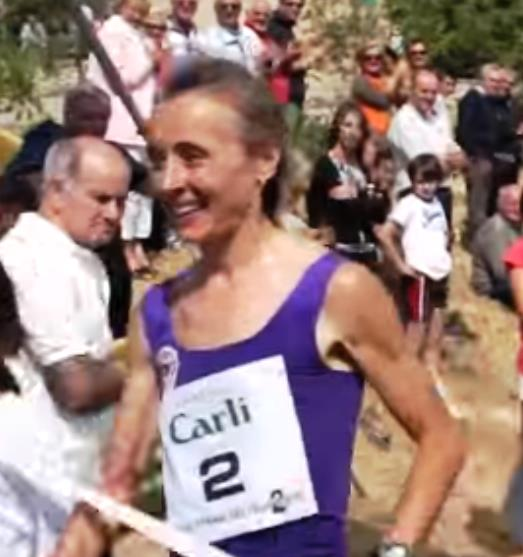
- Ferrara in 2011 at 43.

Personal information
- National team: Italy
- Born: 17 April 1968 (age 58) Limbiate, Italy
- Height: 1.55 m (5 ft 1 in)
- Weight: 42 kg (93 lb)

Sport
- Sport: Athletics
- Event: Long-distance running
- Club: PBM Bovisio Masciago

Achievements and titles
- Personal bests: Half marathon: 1:11:46 (2000); Marathon: 2:27:49 (2004)
Medal record
World Championships
Bronze medal – third place	1995 Gothenburg	Marathon
European Marathon Cup
Gold medal – first place	1994 Helsinki	Team marathon
Women's mountain running
WMRA Challenge
Gold medal – first place	2013 Szklarska	Team
Silver medal – second place	2013 Szklarska	Individual

Ornella Ferrara (born 17 April 1968) is an Italian long-distance runner who specialized in the marathon race. She represented her country twice at the Summer Olympics (1996 and 2000) and was the bronze medalist in the marathon at the 1995 World Championships in Athletics. She has won marathon races in her home country, including the Rome City Marathon, Carpi Marathon and Venice Marathon.

== Biography ==
She narrowly missed out on a medal at the 1994 European Athletics Championships, coming fourth. After that she won the Venice Marathon, followed by the Ferrara Marathon. A run at the 1995 World Championships in Athletics brought her the marathon bronze medal. She represented Italy in the marathon at the Summer Olympics in both 1996 and 2000, but did not reach the top twelve on either occasion.

In 1997 she came fifth at the World Championships Marathon, claimed the title at the Italian Marathon and closed her year with a third place at the New York City Marathon. She did not compete again until 2000, where she returned to the distance with a seventh-place finish at the Boston Marathon. Ferrara returned to full competition in 2001, reach the podium at the San Diego Marathon and Milan Marathon then running for Italy at the 2001 World Championships in Athletics (where she came 14th).

A third place at the Berlin Marathon highlighted her 2003. She won the 2004 Rome City Marathon with a personal best time of 2:27:49 hours, and was runner-up at the Palermo Marathon later that year. Her next marathon win came at the Brescia Marathon in 2008.

She won the inaugural edition of the Monaco Run in March 2011. A ninth-place finish at the Turin Marathon later that year saw her come second in the Italian championship race behind Martina Celi.

== Achievements ==
Year	Competition	Venue	Position	Event	Notes
Representing Italy
1994	European Championships	Helsinki, Finland	4th	Marathon	2:31.57
1994	Venice Marathon	Venice, Italy	1st	Marathon	2:32:16
1995	Ferrara Marathon	Ferrara, Italy	1st	Marathon	2:39:34
1995	World Championships	Gothenburg, Sweden	3rd	Marathon	2:30:11
1996	Olympic Games	Atlanta, United States	13th	Marathon	2:33:09
1996	Rome City Marathon	Rome, Italy	2nd	Marathon	2:31:30
1997	World Championships	Athens, Greece	5th	Marathon	2:33:10
1997	Italian Marathon	Carpi, Emilia-Romagna	1st	Marathon	2:28:43
1997	New York City Marathon	New York, United States	5th	Marathon	2:31:44
2000	Boston Marathon	Boston, United States	7th	Marathon	2:30:20
2000	Olympic Games	Sydney, Australia	18th	Marathon	2:31:32
2001	World Championships	Edmonton, Canada	14th	Marathon	2:32:45
2004	Rome City Marathon	Rome, Italy	1st	Marathon	2:27:49
2007	Italian Marathon	Carpi, Italy	2nd	Marathon	2:30:18

== Personal bests ==
- Half marathon - 1:11:46 hrs (2000)
- Marathon - 2:27:49 hrs (2004)

== National titles ==
- Italian Long Distance Mountain Running Championships
  - Long-distance mountain running: 2011
