= Charlotte Morgan =

Charlotte Morgan may refer to:

- Charlotte Morgan (The O.C.), a character on the American TV series The O.C.
- Charlotte Morgan (softball) (born 1988), American softball player
- Charlotte Morgan (runner) (born 1976), Scottish mountain runner
