= World Long Distance Mountain Running Championships =

Annual mountain running competition

The World Long Distance Mountain Running Championships (from 2004 up to 2014 the name was World Long Distance Mountain Running Challenge), is an annual international mountain running competition organised by the World Mountain Running Association (WMRA).

The race is a one-day long-distance running contest for both sexes which has individual and national team aspects. The host for the event changes on an annual basis, with the minimum requirements for the challenge being that the course is no longer than 45 kilometres (28 mi) in distance, includes an uphill ascent of at least 1.6 km (1 mile), and has a rough duration of between one hour and forty-five minutes and four hours for the elite men. The challenge does not take place on specially-made courses, but rather it is incorporated into pre-existing, traditional races.

The competition was first held in 2004 on a course from Sierre to Zinal. Since its inception, the challenge has been hosted at competitions including the Three Peaks Race in the United Kingdom, Switzerland's Jungfrau Marathon, and the Pikes Peak Marathon in the United States. The event has significant variance in its level of participation: the 2007 race at the Jungfrau Marathon attracted over 4200 runners of fifty nationalities, while at the 2011 of the competition there were 405 runners representing a total of 18 countries.

The 2020 edition was canceled. Beginning in 2021, the event was merged into the 2021 World Mountain and Trail Running Championships.

== Editions ==
Edition	Year	Race	Location	Country	Date	Male Winner	Female Winner
1st	2004	Sierre-Zinal	Valais	Switzerland	8 August	(Mexico) Ricardo Mejía	(Switzerland) Angeline Joly
2nd	2005	Marathon du Vignemale	Cauterets	France	24 July	(Germany) Helmut Schiessl	(Australia) Emma Murray
3rd	2006	Pikes Peak Ascent	Manitou Springs, Colorado	United States	20 August	(United States) Matt Carpenter	(Australia) Emma Murray
4th	2007	Jungfrau Marathon	Bernese Oberland	Switzerland	7 September	(New Zealand) Jonathan Wyatt	(Norway) Anita Haakenstad-Evertsen
5th	2008	Three Peaks Race	Yorkshire	United Kingdom	26 April	(United Kingdom) Jethro Lennox	(Czech Republic) Anna Pichrtová
6th	2009	Kaisermarathon	Söll	Austria	10 October	(Switzerland) Marc Lauenstein	(Czech Republic) Anna Pichrtová
7th	2010	Pikes Peak Ascent	Manitou Springs, Colorado	United States	21 September	(United States) Glenn Randall	(United States) Brandy Erholtz
8th	2011	Gorski Maraton	Podbrdo	Slovenia	18 June	(Slovenia) Mitja Kosovelj	(United Kingdom) Philippa Maddams
9th	2012	Jungfrau Marathon	Bernese Oberland	Switzerland	8 September	(Austria) Markus Hohenwarter	(United States) Stevie Kremer
10th	2013	Maraton Karkonoski	Szklarska Poreba	Poland	3 August	(Slovenia) Mitja Kosovelj	(Italy) Antonella Confortola
11th	2014	Pikes Peak Ascent	Manitou Springs, Colorado	United States	16 August	(United States) Sage Canaday	(United States) Allie McLaughlin
12th	2015	Zermatt Marathon	Zermatt	Switzerland	4 July	(Italy) Tommaso Vaccina	(Switzerland) Martina Strahl
13th	2016	Gorski Maraton	Podbrdo	Slovenia	18 June	(Italy) Alessandro Rambaldini	(United Kingdom) Annie Conway
14th	2017	Giir di Mont	Premana	Italy	6 August	(Italy) Francesco Puppi	(Italy) Silvia Rampazzo
15th	2018	Ultramarathon Gorski	Karpacz	Poland	24 June	(Italy) Alessandro Rambaldini	(United Kingdom) Charlotte Morgan
16th	2019	K42 Adventure Marathon	Villa La Angostura	Argentina	16 November	(United States) Jim Walmsley	(Romania) Cristina Simion
17th	2020	Haría Extreme Lanzarote	Haria	Spain	14 November		

== Winners ==
=== Individual ===
==== Men ====
Year	1st place, gold medalist(s)	2nd place, silver medalist(s)	3rd place, bronze medalist(s)	
2004	(Mexico) Ricardo Mejía	(Germany) Helmut Schiessl	(United Kingdom) Billy Burns	
2005	(Germany) Helmut Schiessl	(Slovenia) Anton Vencelj	(Switzerland) Daniel Bolt	
2006	(United States) Matt Carpenter	(United States) Galen Burrell	(United States) Zac Freudenburg	
2007	(New Zealand) Jonathan Wyatt	(Italy) Hermann Achmüller	(Italy) Gerd Frick	
2008	(United Kingdom) Jethro Lennox	(United Kingdom) Tom Owens	(Slovenia) Mitja Kosovelj	
2009	(Switzerland) Marc Lauenstein	(New Zealand) Jonathan Wyatt	(United Kingdom) Ricky Lightfoot	
2010	(United States) Glenn Randall	(Switzerland) Marc Lauenstein	(United States) Rickey Gates	
2011	(Slovenia) Mitja Kosovelj	(United Kingdom) Tom Owens	(United Kingdom) Robbie Simpson	
2012	(Austria) Markus Hohenwarter	(Slovenia) Mitja Kosovelj	(Kenya) Hosea Tuei	
2013	(Slovenia) Mitja Kosovelj	(United Kingdom) Andrew Davies	(Romania) Ionut Zinca	
2014	(United States) Sage Canaday	(Eritrea) Azerya Teklay	(United States) Andy Wacker	
2015	(Italy) Tommaso Vaccina	(United States) Andy Wacker	(Italy) Francesco Puppi	
2016	(Italy) Alessandro Rambaldini	(Italy) Marco De Gasperi	(Slovenia) Mitja Kosovelj	
2017	(Italy) Francesco Puppi	(Switzerland) Pascal Egli	(United States) Tayte Pollman	
2018	(Italy) Alessandro Rambaldini	(Czech Republic) Robert Krupička	(United States) Joseph Gray	
2019	(United States) Jim Walmsley	(Italy) Francesco Puppi	(Spain) Oriol Cardona Coll	
2020	None	None	None	Cancelled due to COVID-19
2021	(Norway) Stian Angermund	(Italy) Francesco Puppi	(United Kingdom) Jonathan Albon	
2022	(Norway) Stian Angermund	(United Kingdom) Thomas Roach	(Italy) Luca Del Pero	

==== Women ====
Year	1st place, gold medalist(s)	2nd place, silver medalist(s)	3rd place, bronze medalist(s)	
2004	(Switzerland) Angéline Joly	(Colombia) Maria Rodriguez	(France) Isabelle Guillot	
2005	(Australia) Emma Murray	(Austria) Marion Kapuscinski	(France) Isabelle Guillot	
2006	(Australia) Emma Murray	(United States) Danielle Ballengee	(United States) Keri Nelson	
2007	(Norway) Anita Håkenstad Evertsen	(Russia) Yelena Kaledina	(Russia) Zhanna Malkova	
2008	(Czech Republic) Anna Pichrtová	(United Kingdom) Angela Mudge	(Australia) Angela Bateup	
2009	(Czech Republic) Anna Pichrtová	(Russia) Evgeniya Danilova	(New Zealand) Anna Frost	
2010	(United States) Brandy Erholtz	(United States) Kim Dobson	(New Zealand) Anna Frost	
2011	(United Kingdom) Philippa Maddams	(Republic of Ireland) Karen Alexander	(United Kingdom) Helen Fines	
2012	(United States) Stevie Kremer	(Austria) Sabine Reiner	(United States) Kim Dobson	
2013	(Italy) Antonella Confortola	(Italy) Ornella Ferrara	(Poland) Anna Celińska	
2014	(United States) Allie McLaughlin	(United States) Morgan Arritola	(United States) Shannon Payne	
2015	(Switzerland) Martina Strähl	(France) Aline Camboulives	(Italy) Catherine Bertone	
2016	(United Kingdom) Annie Conway	(Italy) Antonella Confortola	(Slovenia) Lucija Krkoč	
2017	(Italy) Silvia Rampazzo	(United States) Kasie Enman	(Romania) Denisa Dragomir	
2018	(United Kingdom) Charlotte Morgan	(Poland) Dominika Stelmach	(Italy) Silvia Rampazzo	
2019	(Romania) Cristina Simion	(France) Adeline Roche	(France) Blandine L'Hirondel	
2020	None	None	None	Cancelled due to COVID-19

=== Team ===
==== Men ====
Year	1st place, gold medalist(s)	2nd place, silver medalist(s)	3rd place, bronze medalist(s)	
2009	Kenya	England	Scotland	
2010	United States	England	Germany	
2011	Scotland	Slovenia	England	
2012	Switzerland	United States	Germany	
2013	Italy; Emanuele Manzi; Tommaso Vaccina; Massimiliano Zanaboni	Czech Republic	Wales	
2014	United States	Italy; Tommaso Vaccina; Xavier Chevrier; Massimo Mei	Germany	
2015	Italy; Tommaso Vaccina; Francesco Puppi; Massimo Mei	United States	Kenya	
2016	Italy; Alessandro Rambaldini; Marco De Gasperi; Fabio Ruga	United Kingdom	Germany	
2017	Italy; Francesco Puppi; Alessandro Rambaldini; Luca Cagnati	United States	Czech Republic	
2018	Czech Republic	United States	Italy; Alessandro Rambaldini; Daniele De Colo; Emanuele Manzi	
2019	Spain	United States	Italy; Francesco Puppi; Gabriele Bacchion; Luca Cagnati	
2020	None	None	None	Cancelled due to COVID-19

==== Women ====
Year	1st place, gold medalist(s)	2nd place, silver medalist(s)	3rd place, bronze medalist(s)	
2009	Russia	Austria	Germany	
2010	United States	Germany	Scotland	
2011	England	Russia	Scotland	
2012	United States	Switzerland	Austria	
2013	Italy; Antonella Confortola; Ornella Ferrara; Ivana Iozzia	Scotland	England	
2014	United States	Italy; Catherine Bertone; Antonella Confortola; Ivana Iozzia	Slovenia	
2015	Switzerland	Italy; Catherine Bertone; Ivana Iozzia; Francesca Iachemet	United States	
2016	Italy; Antonella Confortola; Francesca Iachemet; Debora Cardone	Slovenia	United Kingdom	
2017	Italy; Silvia Rampazzo; Antonella Confortola; Stéphanie Jiménez	United States	Romania	
2018	Austria	United Kingdom	Romania	
2019	France	Spain	Romania	
2020	None	None	None	Cancelled due to COVID-19

== See also ==
- World Mountain Running Championships
- European Mountain Running Championships
- Commonwealth Mountain and Ultradistance Running Championships
- NACAC Mountain Running Championships
- South American Mountain Running Championships
