= Petro Mamu =

Eritrean mountain runner

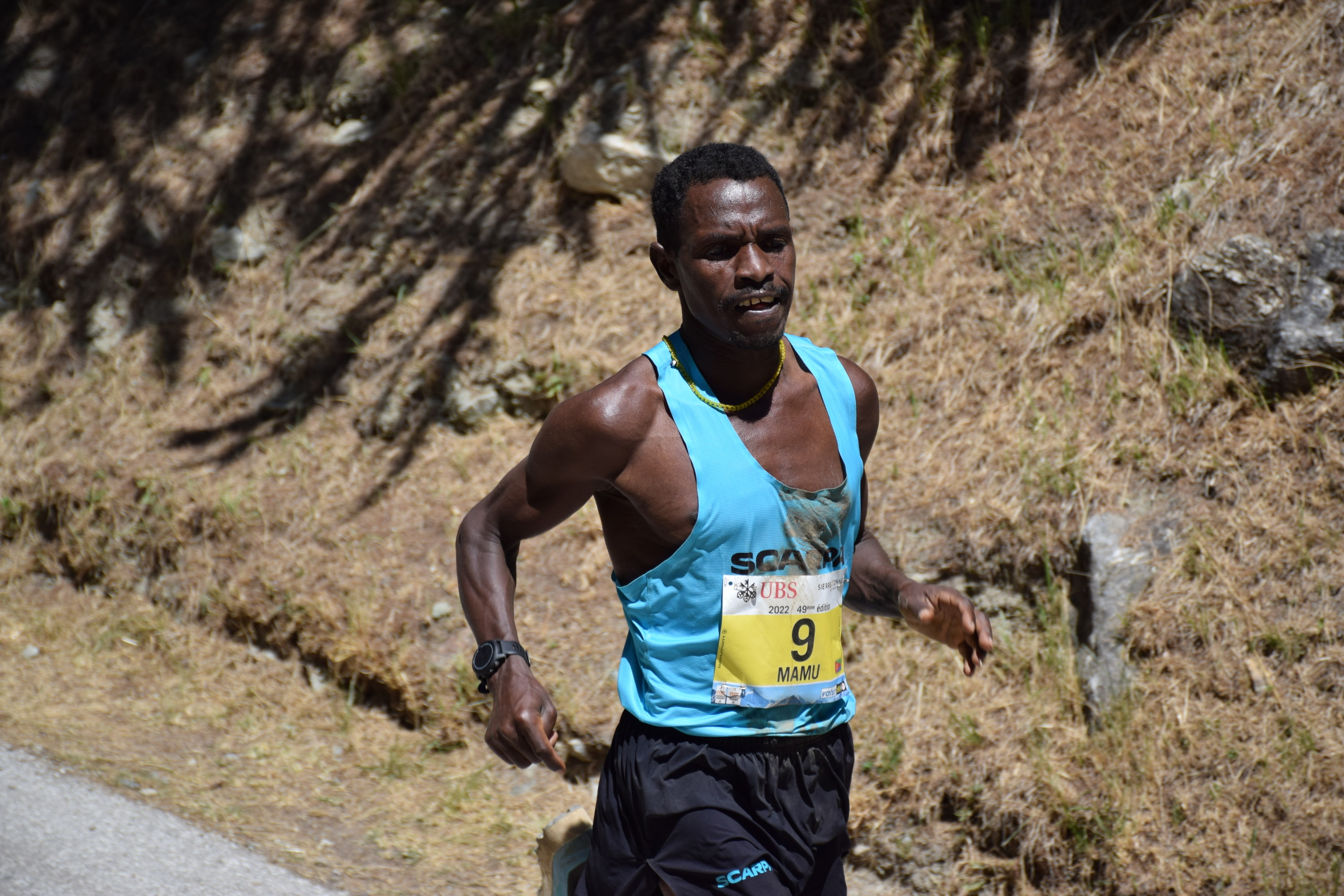
- Petro Mamu at Sierre-Zinal 2022

Personal information
- Full name: Petro Mamu Shaku
- Nationality: Eritrean
- Born: 16 September 1984 (age 41)

Sport
- Country: Eritrea
- Sport: Mountain running

Achievements and titles
- World finals: 1 Mountain Running World Cup: 2014
- Personal best: Marathon: 2:14:50 (2017)

Petro Mamu (born 16 September 1984) is an Eritrean mountain runner who won one World Mountain Running Championships (2012).

== Biography ==
The 2017 World Long Distance Mountain Running Championships was rewritten and the gold medal was dropped by Eritrean Petro Mamu, disqualified for doping, and was assigned to the Italian Francesco Puppi.
