= Catherine Bertone =

Italian athlete

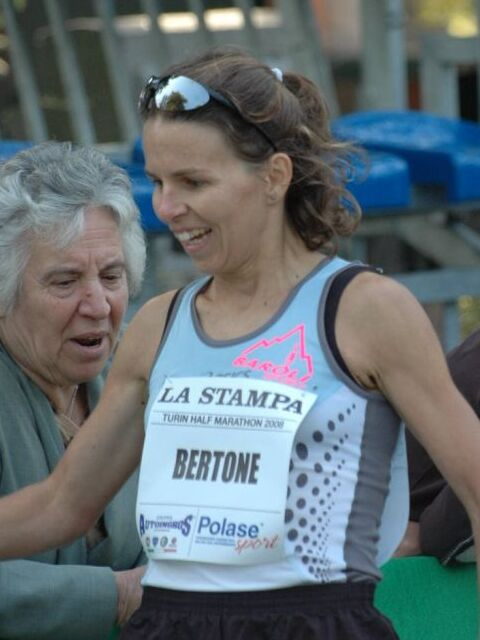
- Bertone at the 2008 Turin Half Marathon

Personal information
- Born: 6 May 1972 (age 54) Bursa, Turkey
- Education: University of Turin
- Height: 160 cm (5 ft 3 in)
- Weight: 45 kg (99 lb)

Sport
- Sport: Athletics; Mountain running
- Event: Long-distance running
- Club: Atletica ASD Sandro Calvesi
- Coached by: Roberto Rastello

Achievements and titles
- Personal best: 2:28:32 (2017)
Medal record
Athletics
European Championships
| Silver medal – second place | 2016 Amsterdam | Half marathon team |
Mountain running
World Long Distance MR C'hips
| Silver medal – second place | 2015 Zermatt | Team |
| Bronze medal – third place | 2015 Zermatt | Individual |

Catherine Bertone (born 6 May 1972) is a Turkish-born Italian marathon runner. She placed 25th at the 2016 Olympics.

== Biography ==
Bertone's father is Italian and her mother is French. She was born in Turkey, where her father worked for Fiat at the time. The family later moved to Belo Horizonte in Brazil before returning to Italy, where Catherine received a medical degree from the University of Turin. She works as a doctor specializing in infectious diseases. She is married to Gabriele Beltrami and has daughters Corinne and Emilie. Her husband and her elder brother Silvio are also elite runners.

== World records ==
Masters athletics

- Marathon W45: 2:28:34, Berlin Germany, 23 September 2017 at the Berlin Marathon.

== See also ==
- List of world records in masters athletics - Marathon Women
- Masters W45 marathon world record progression
- Naturalized athletes of Italy
