= Ollie Johnson =

Ollie Johnson may refer to:

- Ollie Johnson (basketball, born 1942), American basketball player, AAU All-American; University of San Francisco graduate
- Ollie Johnson (basketball, born 1949), American basketball player, for NBA teams; Temple University graduate
- Dink Johnson (1892–1954), American jazz musician
- Oli Johnson (born 1987), English footballer
- the maternal grandfather of Dennis the Menace

== See also ==
- Ollie Johnston (1912–2008), American Disney animator
- Oliver Johnson (disambiguation)
