= Alessandro Rambaldini =

Italian mountain runner

Personal information
- Nationality: Italian
- Born: 12 October 1980 (age 45) Gavardo

Sport
- Country: Italy
- Sport: Mountain running
- Club: Atletica Valli Bergamasche Leffe
- Coached by: Claudio Amati
Medal record
Mountain running
World Long Distance MR Championships
Gold medal – first place	2016 Podbrdo	Individual
Gold medal – first place	2018 Karpacz	Individual

Alessandro Rambaldini (born 12 October 1980) is an Italian male mountain runner, world champion at the 2016 World Long Distance Mountain Running Championships and 2018 World Long Distance Mountain Running Championships.

== National titles ==
- Italian Long Distance Mountain Running Championships
  - Long distance mountain running: 2018 (1)
