= Oliver Johnston =

Oliver Johnston may refer to:

- Ollie Johnston (1912–2008), American film animator
- Oliver Johnston (actor) (1888–1966), English actor

== See also ==
- Oliver Johnson (disambiguation)
