= Martina Strähl =

Swiss mountain runner

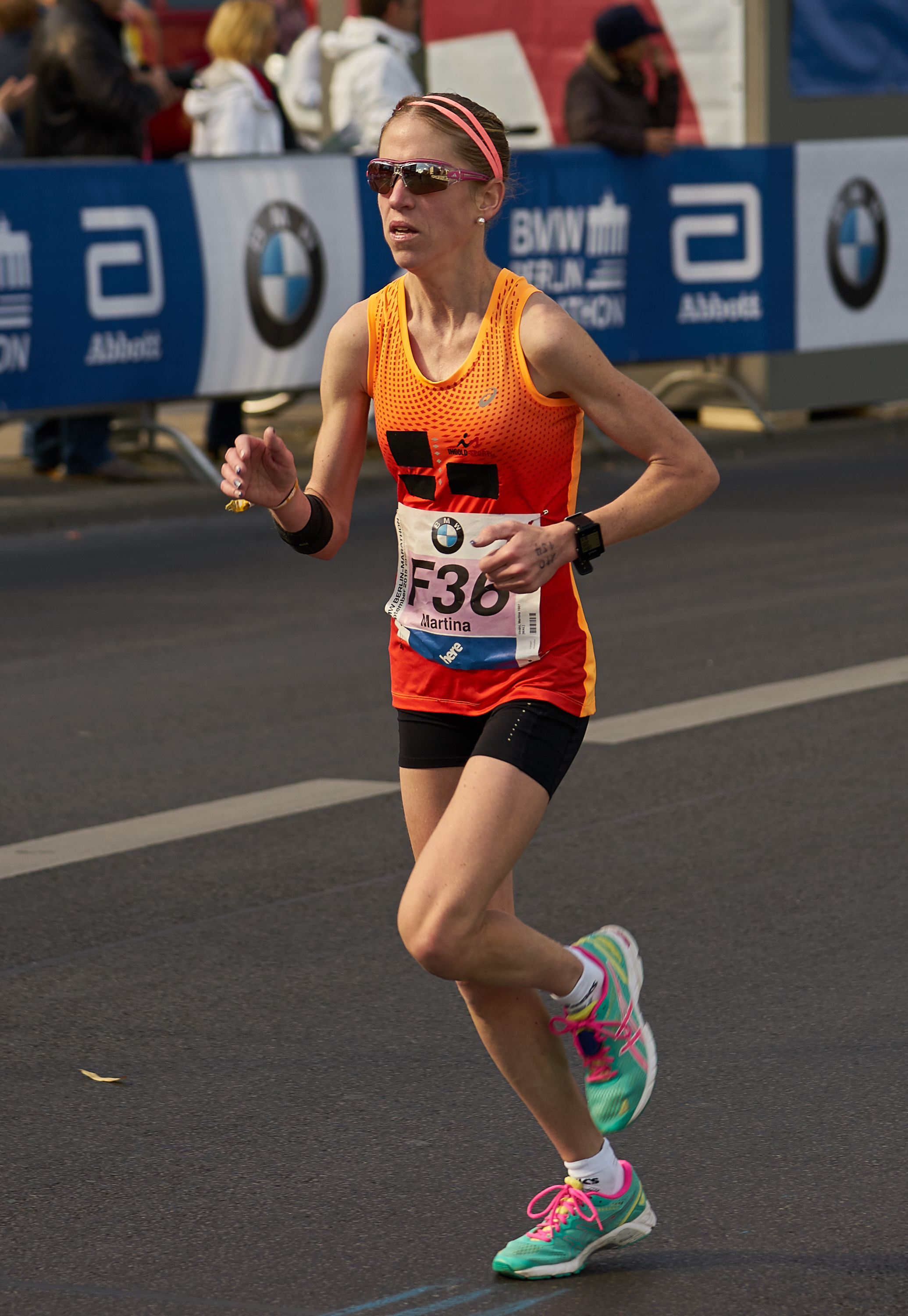

Personal information
- Nationality: Swiss
- Born: 7 May 1987 (age 39) Solothurn, Switzerland
- Height: 1.67 m (5 ft 6 in)
- Weight: 48 kg (106 lb)

Sport
- Country: Switzerland
- Sport: Sport of athletics; Mountain running
- Event: Long-distance running
- Club: Strähl
- Coached by: Fritz Häni

Achievements and titles
- Personal bests: Half marathon: 1:09:29 (2018); Marathon: 2:28:07 (2018)
Medal record
Mountain running
Event	1st	2nd	3rd
World Championships (individual)	0	1	1
World Championships (team)	0	2	1
World LD Championships (individual)	1	0	0
World LD Championships (team)	1	0	0
European Championships (individual)	2	0	0
European Championships (tema)	1	2	1
Total	5	5	3

Martina Strähl (born 7 May 1987) is a Swiss female long-distance runner and mountain runner, world champion at the World Long Distance Mountain Running Championships (2015) and twice at the European Mountain Running Championships (2009, 2011).

== Biography ==
Strähl won a silver (2006) and a bronze medal (2010) at individual senior level at the World Mountain Running Championships and others three medals with the national team. In 2015 at the World Long Distance Mountain Running Championships won also the gold medal at senior level with the national team and four others medals with the national team at the European Mountain Running Championships.

She won Zermatt marathon in 2015 (marathon distance) and 2019 (half marathon distance).

== National records ==
- 15K run: 48:54 ( (Germany) Berlin, 8 April 2018) - current holder
- Half marathon: 1:09:29 ( (Germany) Berlin, 8 April 2018) - current holder

== Achievements ==
Year	Competition	Venue	Position	Event	Time	Notes
Athletics
2016	European Championships	(Netherlands) Amsterdam	15th	Half marathon	1:12:55	
2018	European Championships	(Germany) Berlin	7th	Marathon	2:28:07	PB

== National titles ==
Strähl won three national championships at individual senior level.

- Swiss Athletics Championships
  - 5000 metres: 2010, 2011
  - Marathon: 2018

== See also ==
- List of Swiss records in athletics
