= Markus Hohenwarter =

Austrian mountain runner

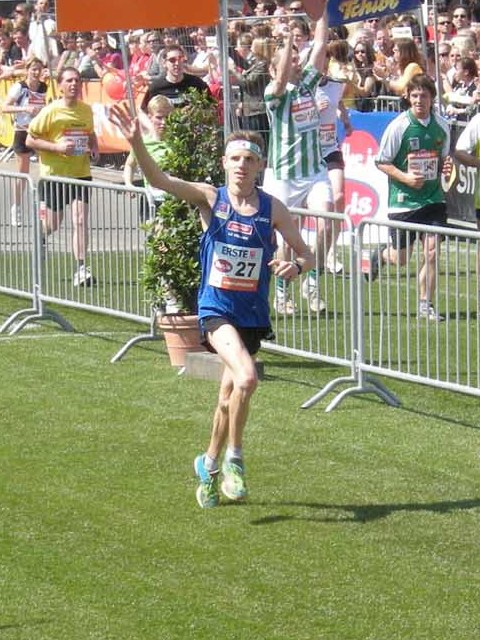

Personal information
- Nationality: Austrian
- Born: 29 January 1980 (age 46) Carinthia, Austria

Sport
- Country: Austria
- Sport: Sport of athletics; Mountain running
- Event: Long-distance running

Achievements and titles
- Personal bests: Half marathon: 1:04:26 (2008); Marathon: 2:15.34 (2012)

Markus Hohenwarter (born 29 January 1980) is an Austrian male mountain runner, world champion at the World Long Distance Mountain Running Championships (2012).
