= Silvia Rampazzo =

Italian mountain runner

Personal information
- National team: Italy (4 caps)
- Born: 19 January 1980 (age 46) Mestre, Italy

Sport
- Country: Italy
- Sport: Sport of Athletics; Mountain running; Trail running; Sky running
- Event: Long-distance running
- Club: Tornado

Achievements and titles
- Personal best: Half marathon: 1:20:43 (2018)
Medal record
Mountain running
| Event | 1st | 2nd | 3rd |
|---|---|---|---|
| World LD Championships (individual) | 1 | 0 | 1 |
| World LD Championships (team) | 1 | 0 | 0 |
| Total | 2 | 0 | 1 |
World Long Distance Championships
| Gold medal – first place | 2017 Premana | Individual |
| Bronze medal – third place | 2018 Karpacz | Individual |
Trail running
World Championships
| Bronze medal – third place | 2017 Badia Prataglia | Individual |

Silvia Rampazzo (born 19 January 1980) is an Italian female long-distance runner and mountain runner who won the gold medal at individual senior level at the 2017 World Long Distance Mountain Running Championships.

== Biography ==
She finished 3rd at the 2019 Sierre-Zinal.

== National titles ==
She won four national championships at individual senior level.

- Italian Skyrunning Championships
  - SkyRace: 2016, 2019
  - SkyMarathon: 2016
  - UltraMarathon: 2014
