= Glenn Randall =

American mountain runner

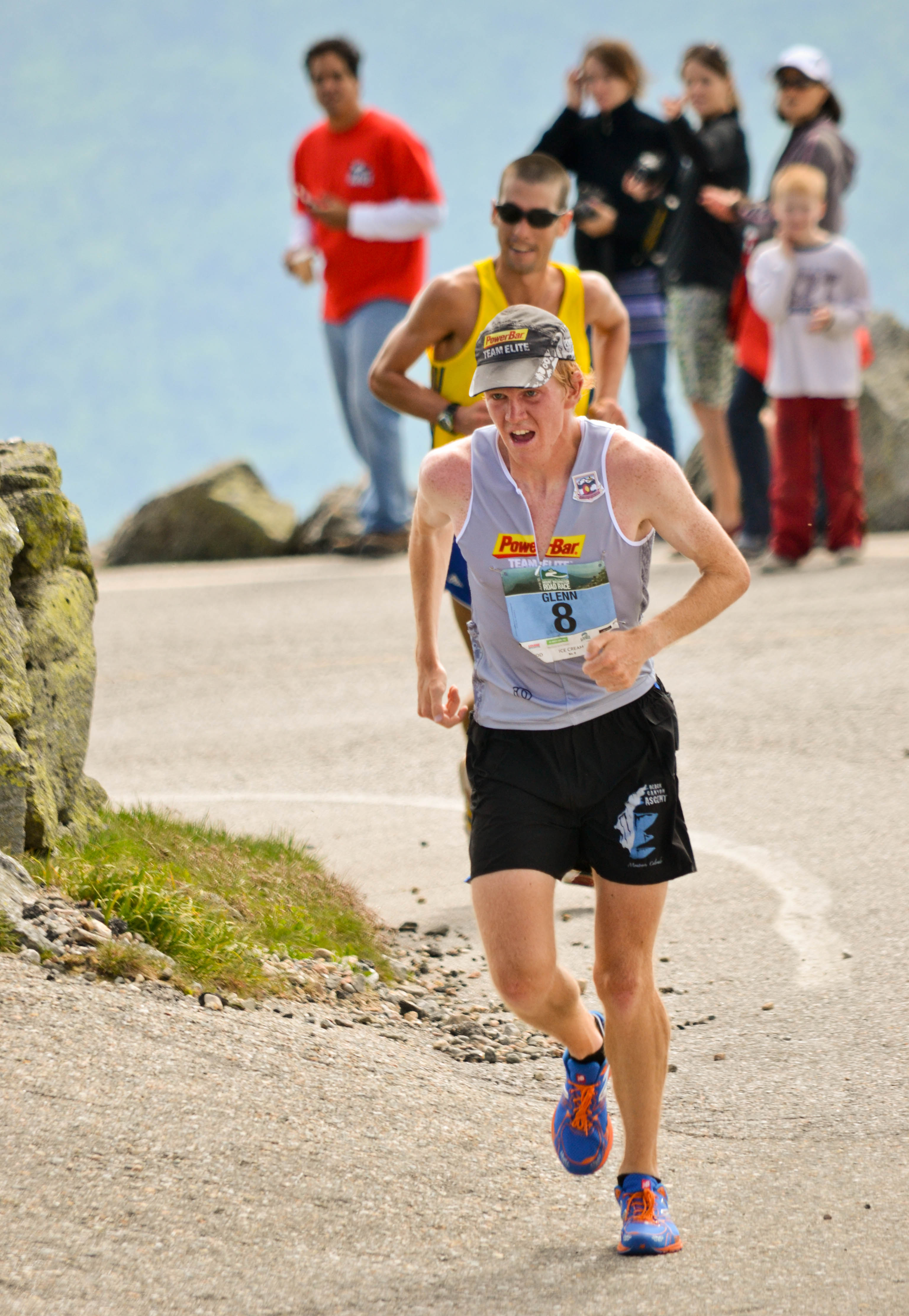

Personal information
- Born: 3 September 1986 (age 39) Mesa, Colorado, United States

Sport
- Country: United States
- Sport: Sport of athletics; Mountain running; Cross-country skiing
- Event: Long-distance running

Achievements and titles
- Personal best: Half marathon: 1:06:09 (2013)

Glenn Randall (born 3 September 1986) is an American male cross-country skier and mountain runner, twice world champion at the World Long Distance Mountain Running Championships (2010).
