= Angéline Joly =

Swiss mountain runner

Personal information
- Full name: Angéline Flückiger-Joly
- Nationality: Swiss
- Born: 28 February 1974 (age 52) Le Locle, Switzerland

Sport
- Country: Switzerland
- Sport: Sport of athletics; Mountain running
- Event: Long-distance running

Achievements and titles
- Personal best: Half marathon: 1:19:53 (2003)
Medal record
Mountain running
Event	1st	2nd	3rd
World Championships (team)	0	1	0
World LD Championships (individual)	1	0	0
European Championships (individual)	0	0	1
European Championships (team)	1	0	0
Total	2	1	1

Angéline Joly (born 28 February 1974) is a former Swiss female mountain runner, world champion at the World Long Distance Mountain Running Championships (2004).

== Biography ==
Joly was bronze medal at individual senior level at the European Mountain Running Championships (2005) and one time gold medal with the national team (2007). And silver medal with the national team at the World Mountain Running Championships (2009).

She also won Matterhorn Ultraks in 2005.
