= Tommaso Vaccina =

Italian mountain runner (born 1980)

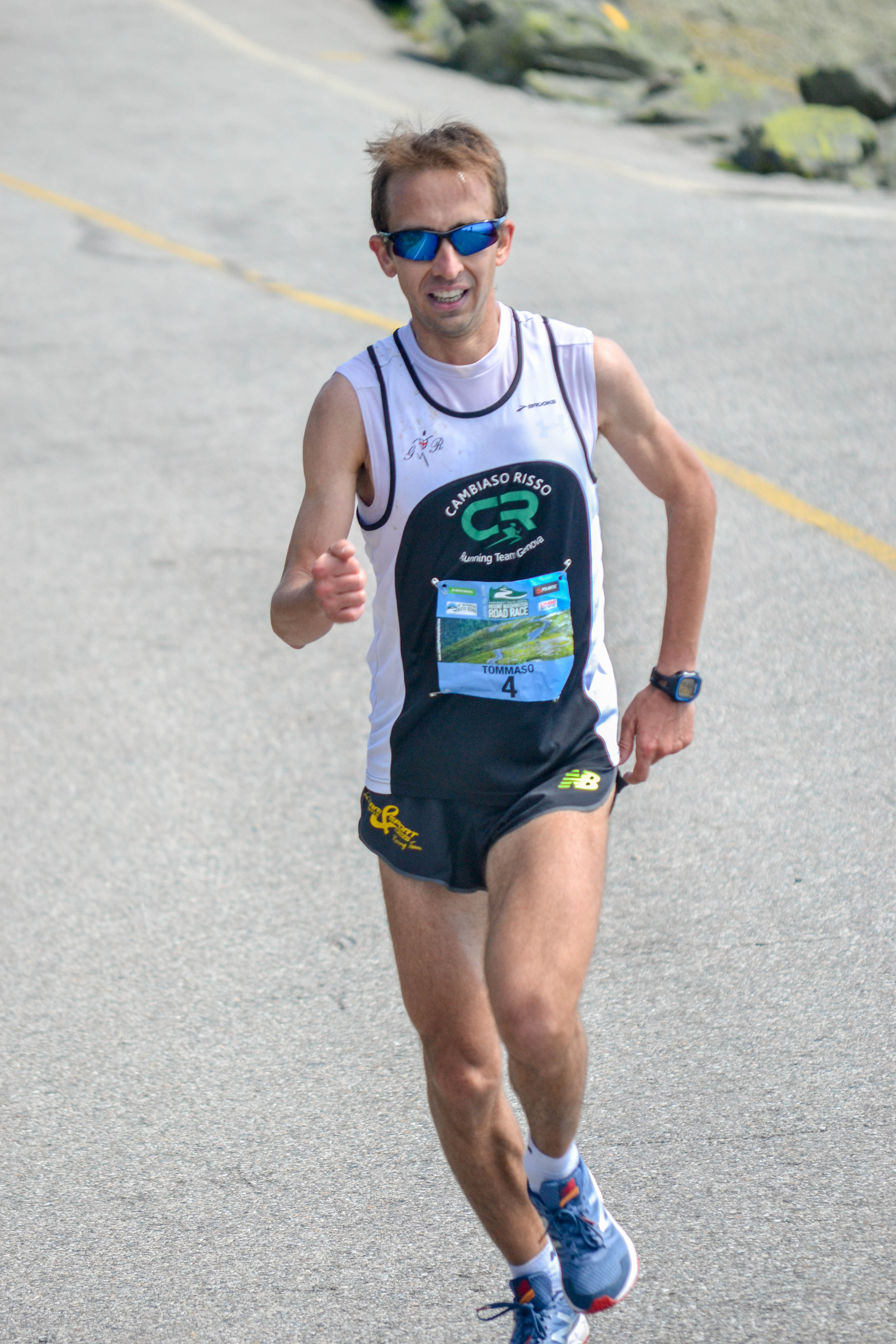

Personal information
- Nationality: Italian
- Born: 5 April 1980 (age 46) Pavia, Italy

Sport
- Country: Italy
- Sport: Mountain running
- Club: Cambiaso Risso Running

Achievements and titles
- Personal bests: Half marathon: 1:06:16 (2007); Marathon: 2:19:48 (2011)
Medal record
Mountain running
Event	1st	2nd	3rd
World Championships (team)	0	0	2
World LD Championships (individual)	1	0	0
World LD Championships (team)	2	1	0
Total	3	1	2

Tommaso Vaccina (born 5 April 1980) is an Italian male mountain runner, world champion at the World Long Distance Mountain Running Championships (2015).

== Biography ==
Vaccina also won three medals at senior level with the national team at the World Mountain Running Championships.

He won Zermatt marathon in 2015.

== National titles ==
He won a national championship at individual senior level.

- Italian Vertical Kilometer Championships
  - Vertical kilometer: 2014

== See also ==
- Italy at the World Mountain Running Championships
