= Emanuele Manzi =

Italian mountain runner

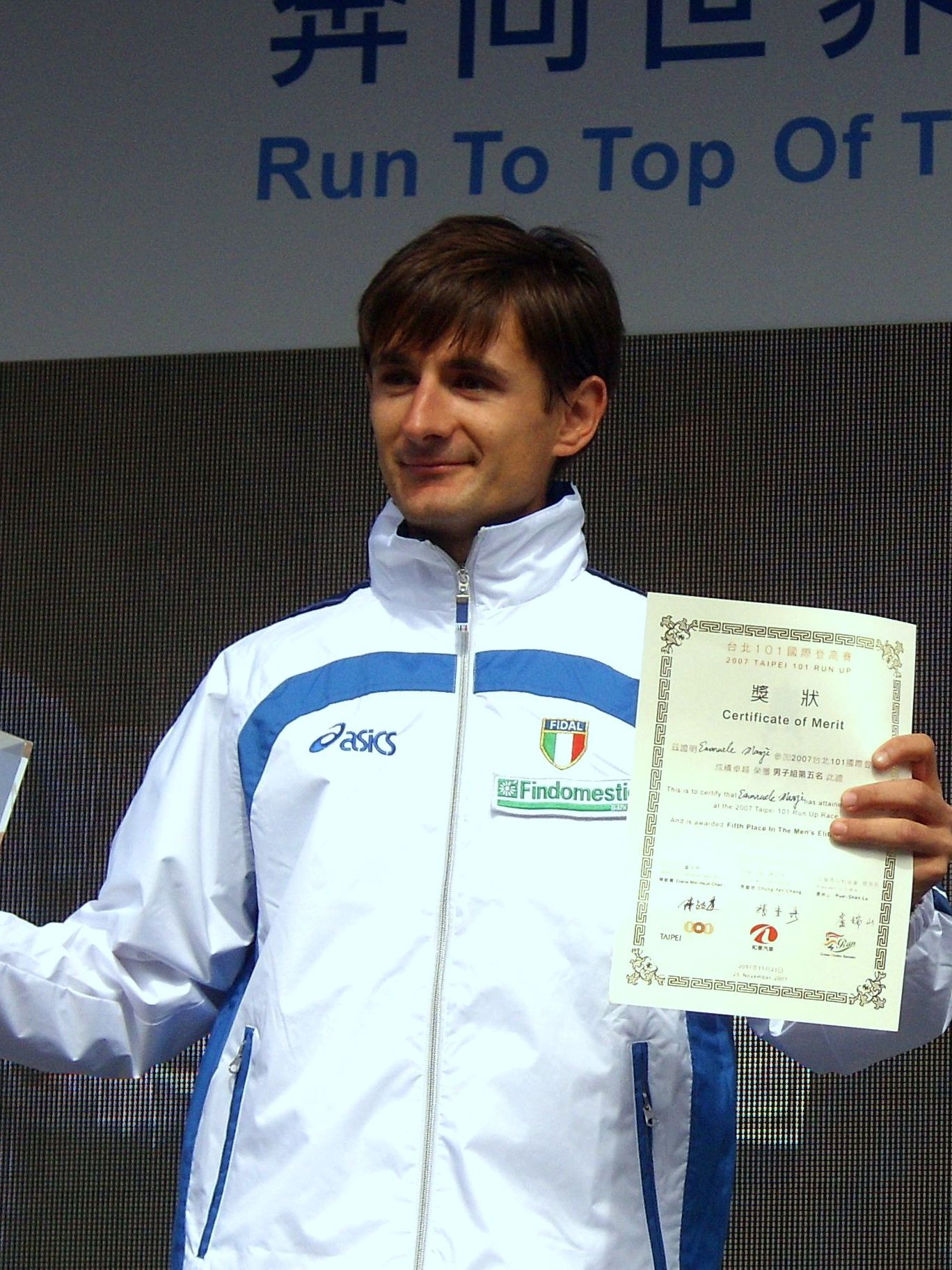

Personal information
- Nationality: Italian
- Born: 25 October 1977 (age 48) Italy

Sport
- Country: Italy
- Sport: Mountain running
- Club: US Malonno

Achievements and titles
- Personal best: Half marathon: 1:06:47 (2004)
Medal record
Mountain running
Event	1st	2nd	3rd
World Championships (individual)	0	1	0
World Championships (team)	6	2	0
World LD Championships (team)	1	0	0
European Championships (team)	3	0	0
Total	10	3	0
World Championships
Silver medal – second place	2001 Arta Terme	Individual

Emanuele Manzi (born 25 October 1977) is an Italian male mountain runner, who won a medal at individual senior level at the World Mountain Running Championships.

== See also ==
- Italy at the World Mountain Running Championships
- Italy at the European Mountain Running Championships
