= Ivana Iozzia =

Italian marathon runner

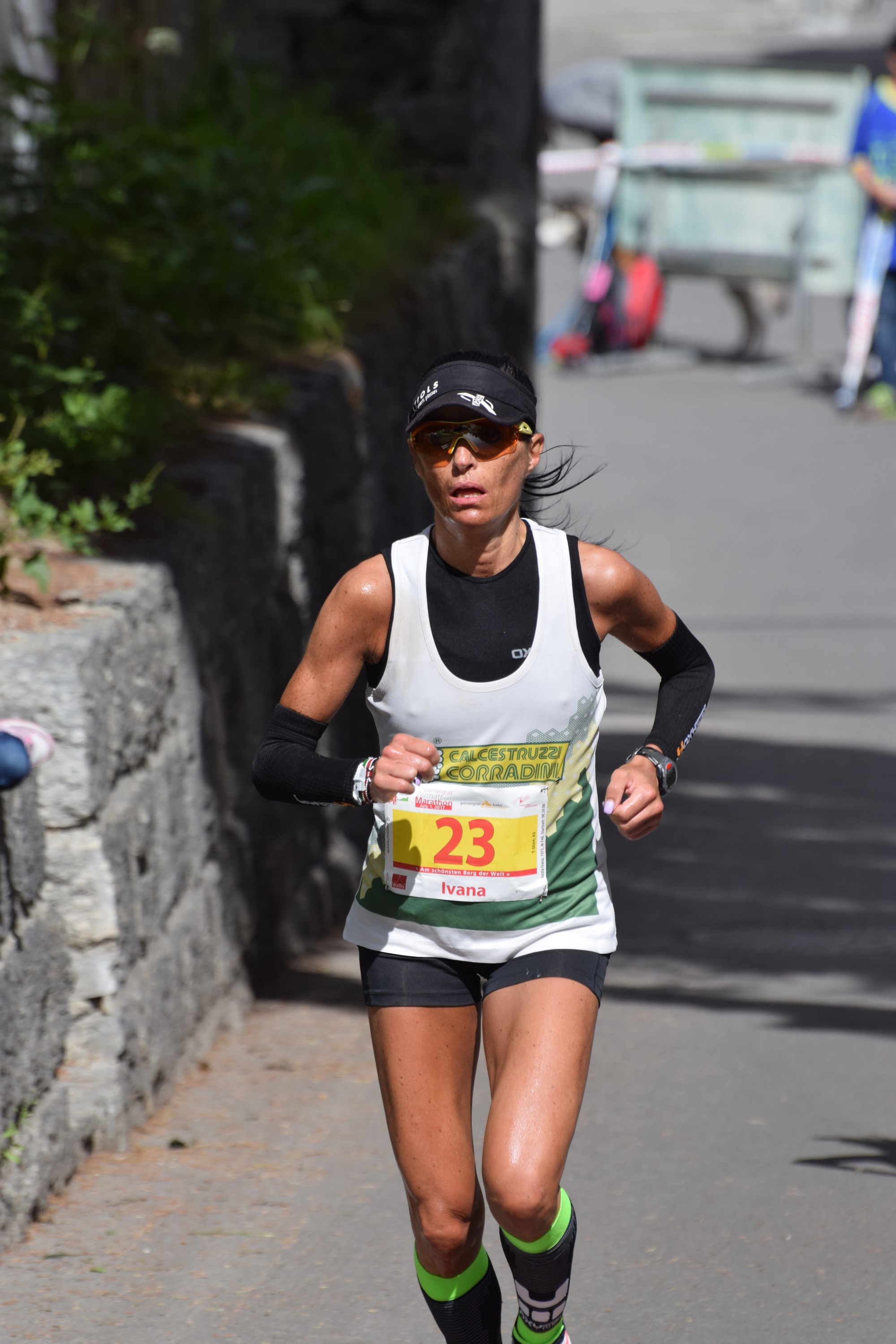

Personal information
- Nickname: Insubrica volante
- Nationality: Italian
- Born: 18 February 1973 (age 53) Como, Italy
- Height: 1.63 m (5 ft 4 in)
- Weight: 48 kg (106 lb)

Sport
- Country: Italy
- Sport: Athletics
- Event: Marathon
- Club: Calcestruzzi Corradini Excels

Achievements and titles
- Personal bests: Half marathon: 1:12.55 (2009); Marathon: 2:34.07 (2007)
Medal record
International Marathons
Event	1st	2nd	3rd
Italian Marathon	1	0	0
Maratona di Sant'Antonio	1	0	0
Women's mountain running
WMRA Challenge
Gold medal – first place	2013 Szklarska	Team

Ivana Iozzia (born 18 February 1973 in Como) is an Italian female marathon runner.

== Biography ==
She won the Maratona di Sant'Antonio in 2005 and won the Italian Marathon in 2012 at age 39. She underwent a liver operation in 2011 and was pleased to return to good form with her run of 2:35:08 hours. She is a three-time national champion in the event.

She won Zermatt marathon in 2017 and 2018.

== National records ==
- 30 km (road): 1:47:50 ( (Switzerland) Lugano, 20 September 2009) - Current holder

== Achievements ==
Year	Competition	Venue	Position	Event	Performance	Note
2004	World Half Marathon Championships	(India) New Delhi	30th	Half marathon	1:15:59	
2004	World Half Marathon Championships	(India) New Delhi	5th	Team	64 pt	
2005	World Half Marathon Championships	(Canada) Edmonton	37th	Half marathon	1:15:46	
2009	World Half Marathon Championships	(United Kingdom) Birmingham	42nd	Half marathon	1:14:52	
2013	Turin Marathon	(Italy) Turin	1st	Marathon	2:34:12	

== National titles ==
She has won 3 times the individual national championship.

- 3 wins in the marathon (2005, 2007, 2012)

== See also ==
- Italian records in athletics
