= Helmut Schiessl =

German mountain runner (born 1972)

Personal information
- Nickname: Fuzzy
- Nationality: German
- Born: 25 February 1972 (age 54) Buchenberg, Germany

Sport
- Country: Germany
- Sport: Sport of athletics; Mountain running; Sky running
- Event: Long-distance running
- Club: TSV Buchenberg

Achievements and titles
- Personal best: Half marathon: 1:08:38 (2007)
Medal record
Mountain running
Event	1st	2nd	3rd
World LD Championships (individual)	1	1	0
European Championships (individual)	0	1	0
Total	1	2	0
Sky running
Event	1st	2nd	3rd
Skyrunning European Championships	0	1	1
Total	0	1	1

Helmut Schiessl (born 25 February 1972) is a German male mountain runner, twice world champion at the World Long Distance Mountain Running Championships (2004).
