= Annie Conway =

British mountain runner

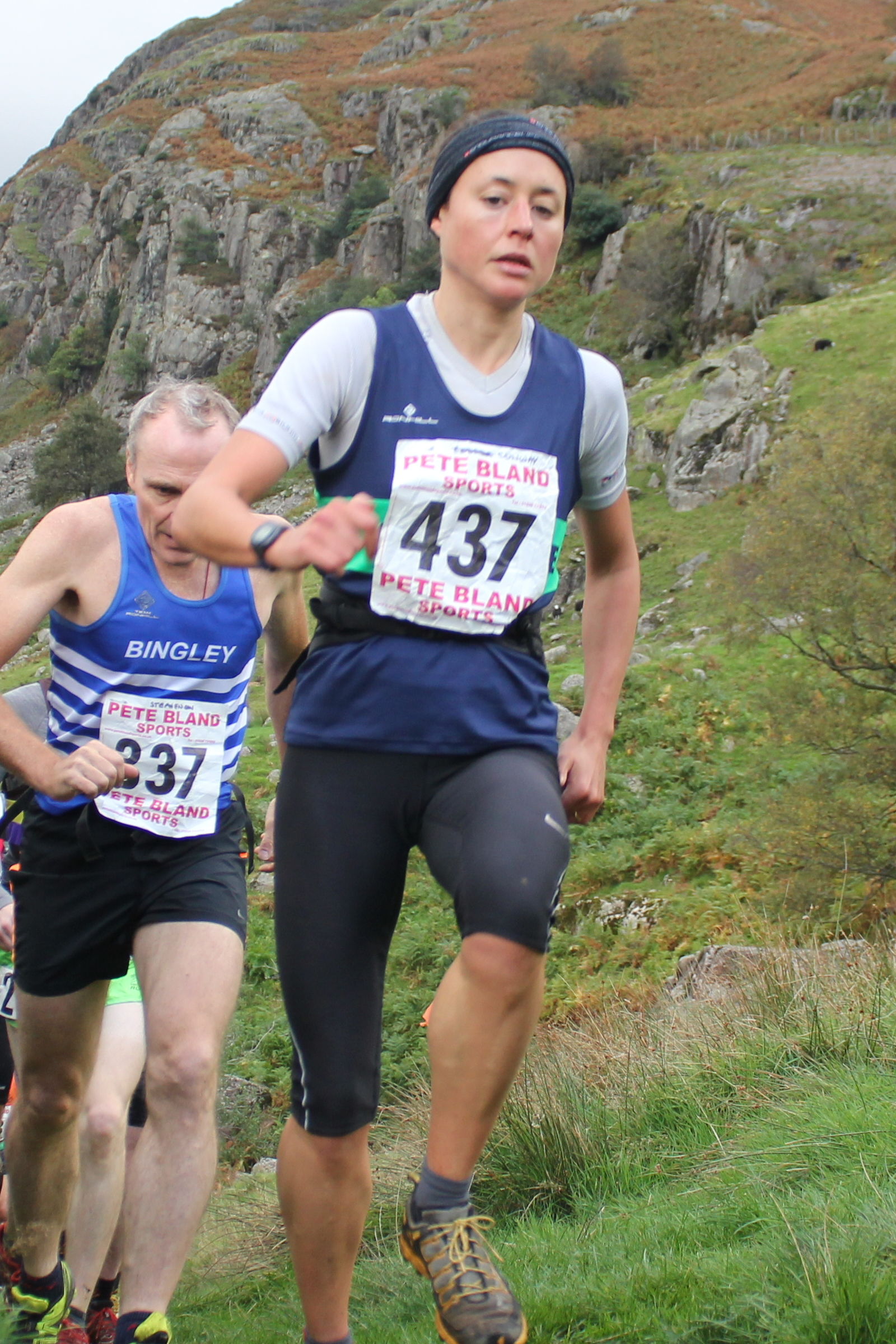
- Annie Conway at 2013 Langdale Horseshoe

Personal information
- Nationality: British
- Born: 21 June 1981 (age 44) Ambleside, United Kingdom

Sport
- Country: United Kingdom
- Sport: Mountain running
- Club: Ambleside Athletic Club

Annie Conway (born 21 June 1981) is a British female mountain runner who won the World Long Distance Mountain Running Championships in 2016.

She also won the Snowdon Race in 2017.
