= Emma Murray =

Australian mountain runner

Personal information
- Nationality: Australian
- Born: 23 February 1978 (age 48) Hornsby, Australia

Sport
- Country: Australia
- Sport: Sport of athletics; Mountain running
- Event: Long-distance running

Achievements and titles
- Personal best: Marathon: 2:45:42 (2006)

Emma Murray (born 23 February 1978) is a former Australian female mountain runner, twice world champion at the World Long Distance Mountain Running Championships (2005, 2006).
