= Andrew Davies (British runner) =

British athlete

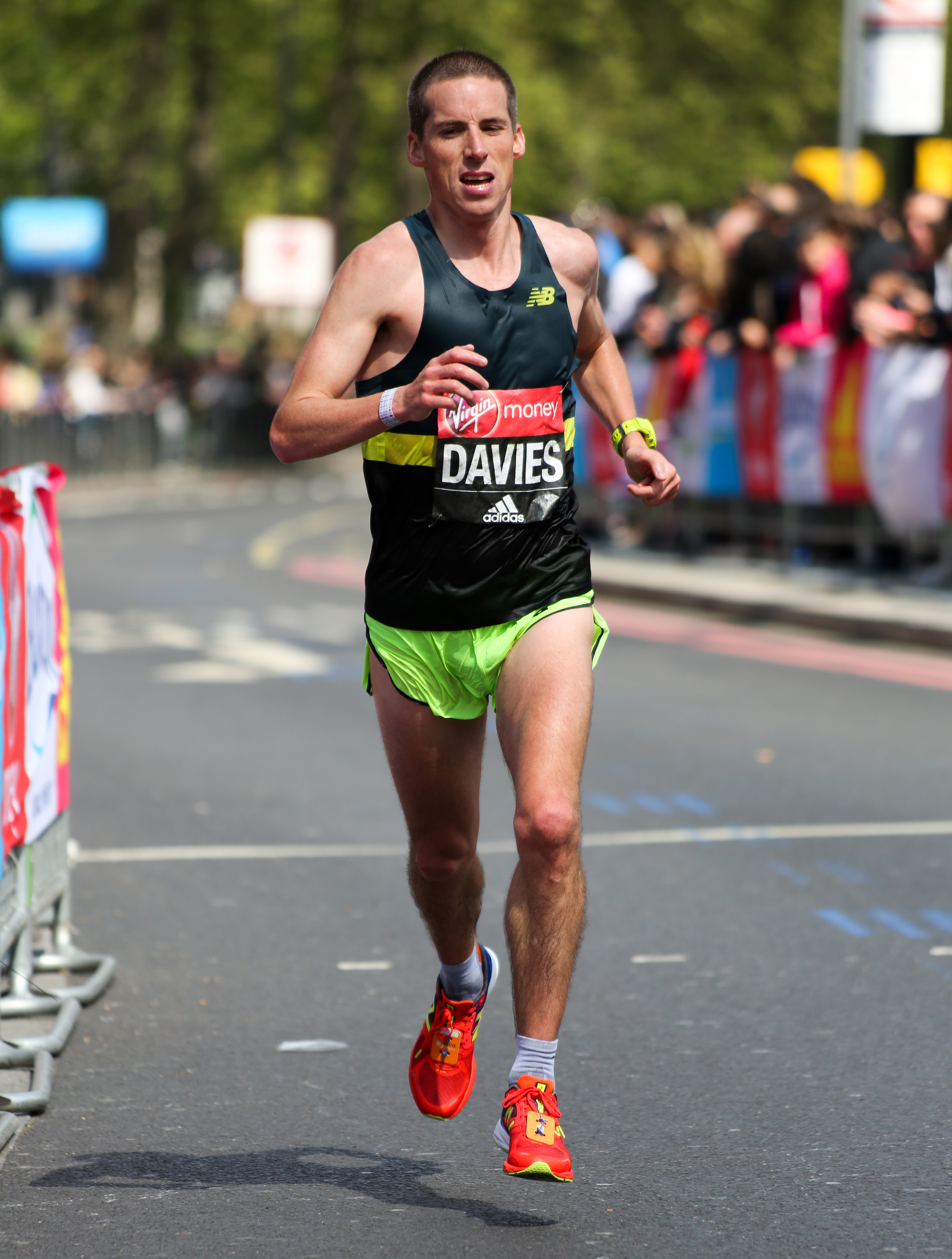
- Davies at the 2017 London Marathon

Personal information
- Nationality: Welsh, British
- Born: 30 October 1979 (age 45)

Sport
- Sport: Long-distance running
- Event: Marathon
- Club: Stockport / Mercia Fell

Andrew Davies (born 30 October 1979) is a Welsh, British long-distance runner and mountain runner. He competed in the men's marathon at the 2017 World Championships in Athletics, placing 31st in 2:17:59.

Davies participated in the 2016 World Long Distance Mountain Running Championships held in Podbrdo, Slovenia. He placed 9th in the men's event, and second in the team event as part of the United Kingdom team.

He represented Wales in the marathon at the Commonwealth Games in 2014 and 2018, finishing 17th and 11th respectively. He was fifth in the 2016 IAU 50 km World Championships, and ran a time of 2:15:11 at the 2017 London Marathon.

In 2018, Davies won the 35-39 age category at the World Masters Mountain Running Championships.

In 2019, he set a personal best of 2:14:36 at the Valencia Marathon. His time there was a new British over-40 record for the marathon.
