= Jethro Lennox =

British mountain runner

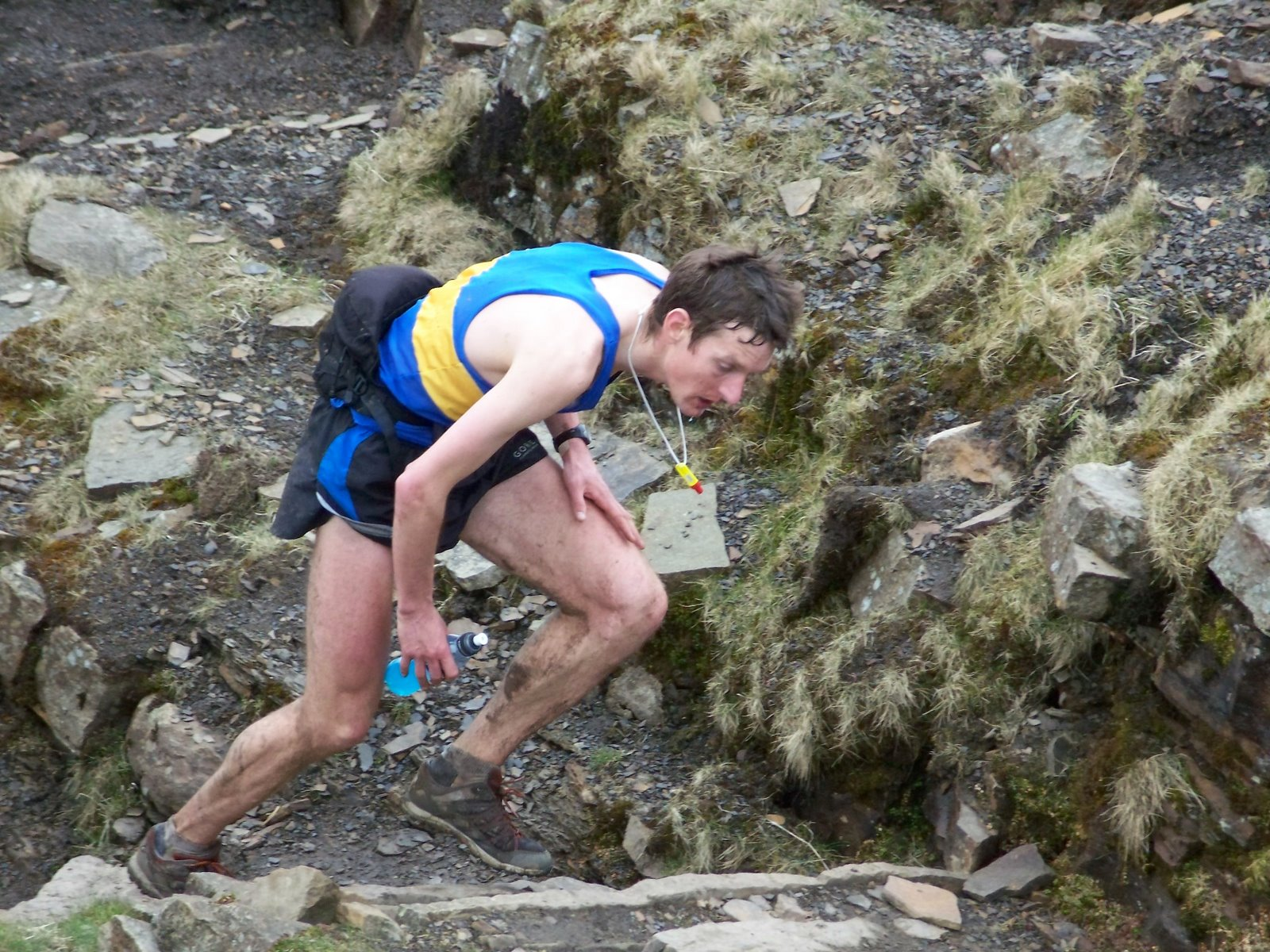

Personal information
- Nationality: British
- Born: 6 December 1976 (age 49) Scotland, United Kingdom

Sport
- Country: United Kingdom
- Sport: Sport of athletics; Mountain running
- Event: Long-distance running

Achievements and titles
- Personal best: Half marathon: 1:07:04 (2010)

Jethro Lennox (born 6 December 1976) is a Scottish male mountain runner who won the World Long Distance Mountain Running Challenge at the Three Peaks Race in 2008.

He was the Scottish hill running champion in 2004, 2006, 2008 and 2011.
