= Ricky Lightfoot =

British runner (born 1985)

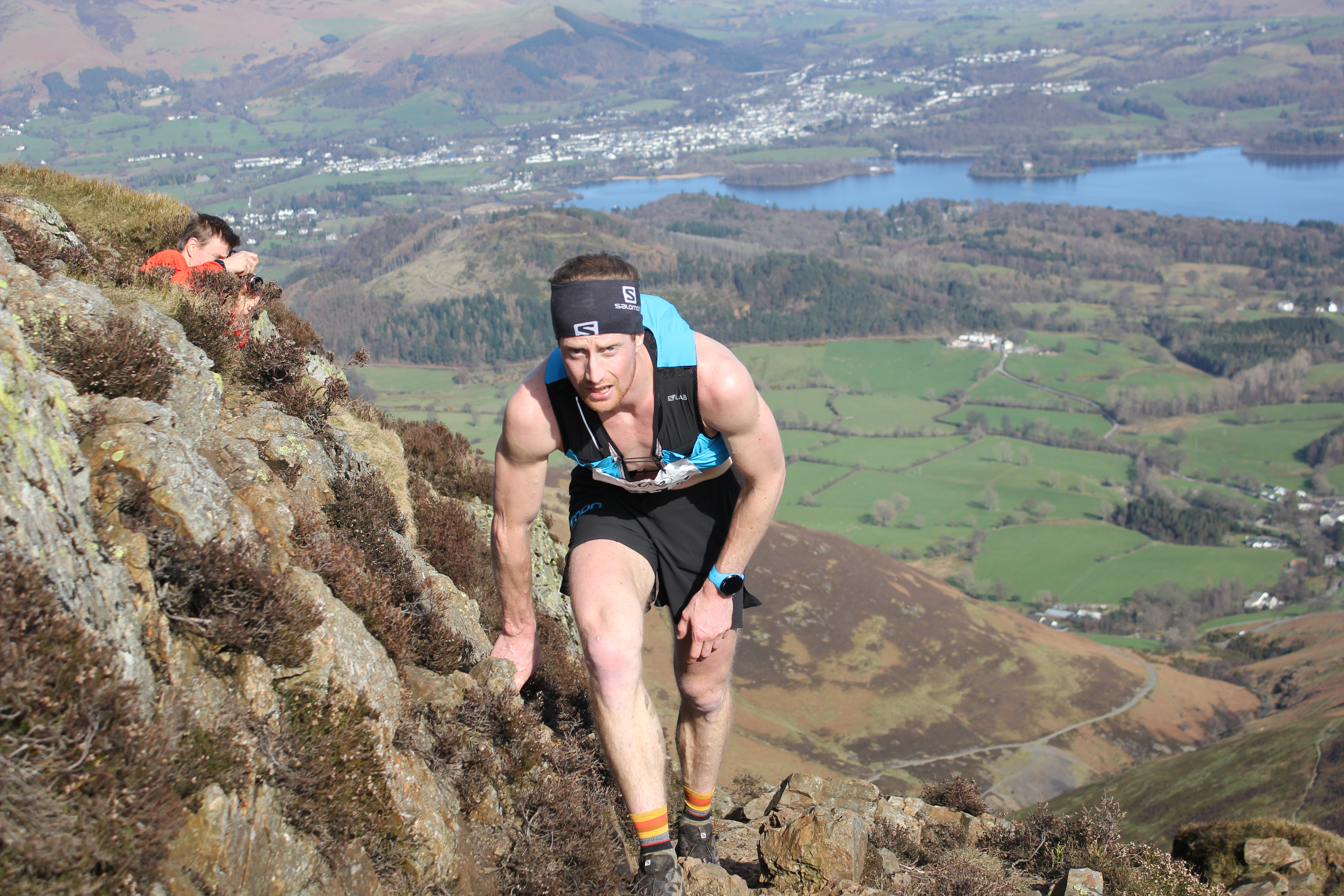

Personal information
- Full name: Ricky Lightfoot
- Nationality: British
- Born: 31 March 1985 (age 41) Workington, Cumbria, England

Sport
- Sport: Athletics
- Event(s): Fell running, trail running, ultramarathon
- Club: Ellenborough Athletic Club

Ricky William Lightfoot (born 31 March 1985) is a British runner who has been a world champion in trail running and a medallist in the World Long Distance Mountain Running Challenge.

== Biography ==
Lightfoot began competing in fell races at the age of fourteen after being inspired by his school caretaker Brian Taylor and was encouraged by his parents Robert and Kathleen. He has been sponsored by Salomon since 2008. Lightfoot is a member of Ellenborough AC.

He has won several of the most prestigious fell races, including the Three Peaks Race, Wasdale, Borrowdale, Ennerdale, the Three Shires and Skiddaw. He won the Lakeland Classics Trophy series in 2007 and 2015.

He has also competed domestically on other surfaces, winning the Brampton to Carlisle and Derwentwater 10 road races and the Cumbria Cross Country Championships.

Internationally, Lightfoot won the Zegama-Aizkorri race in 2009 and finished third in that season’s Skyrunner World Series. He was also third in the World Long Distance Mountain Running Challenge that year when the event was incorporated into the Kaisermarathon in Söll.

He won the Hammer Trail in Denmark, his first ultramarathon, in 2012. In 2013, he won the IAU Trail World Championships when the competition was held in Llanrwst. Also that year, he won the Trail du Colorado in Réunion and the Otter Trail Run in South Africa.

In 2014, he was victorious at the Dodo Trail in Mauritius and the following year he won the Ultra SkyMarathon Madeira.

In 2022, he won the Man versus Horse Marathon.

Lightfoot works as a firefighter, based at Workington Fire Station and is managed by Iconic Agency.
