= Charlotte Morgan (runner) =

British mountain runner

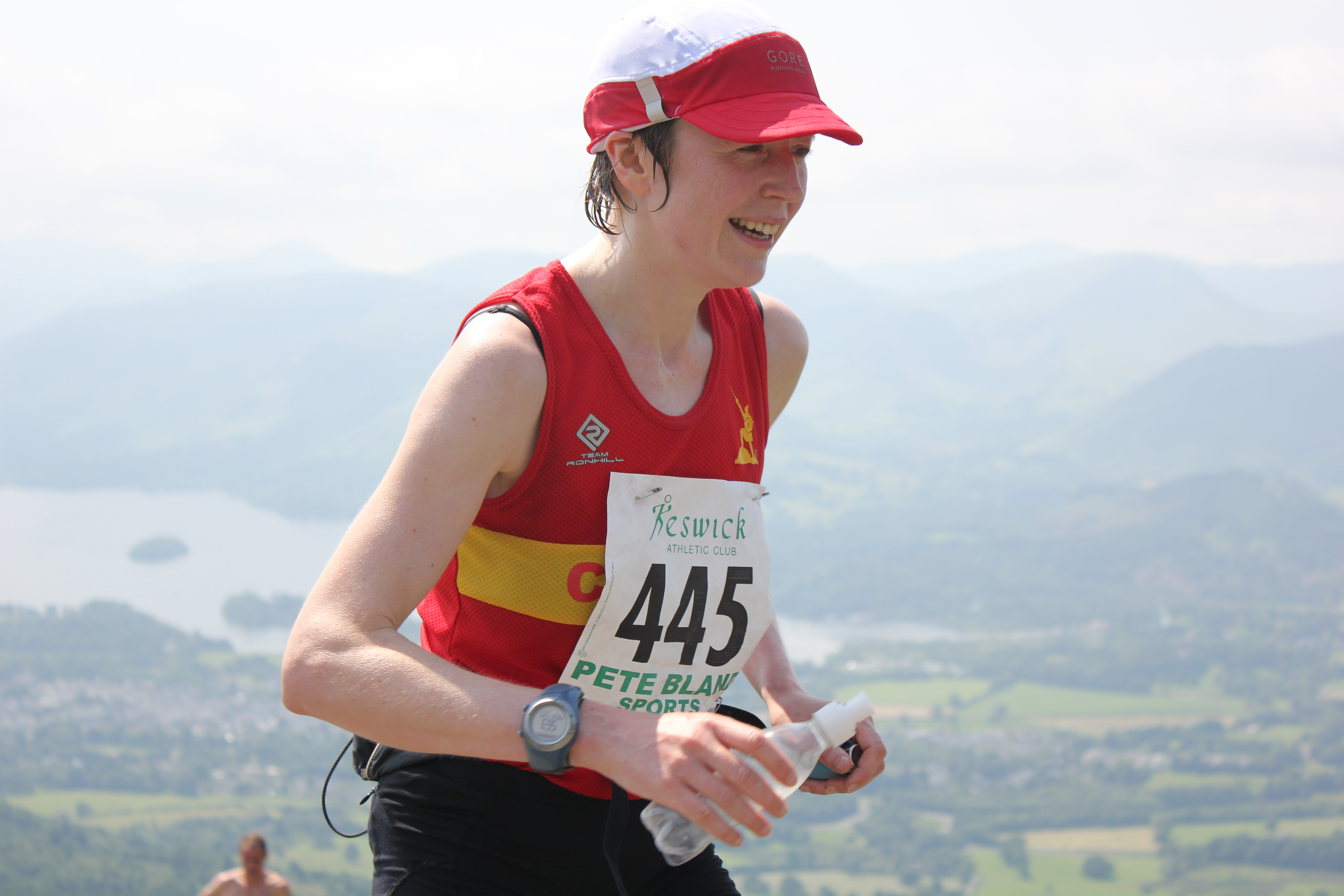

Personal information
- Nationality: British
- Born: 1976 (age 48–49) Scotland, United Kingdom

Sport
- Country: United Kingdom
- Sport: Mountain running
- Club: Carnethy

Charlotte Morgan (born 1976) is a British female mountain runner, world champion at the World Long Distance Mountain Running Championships (2018) and she was also silver medal with the national team.
