= Marc Lauenstein =

Swiss orienteering competitor

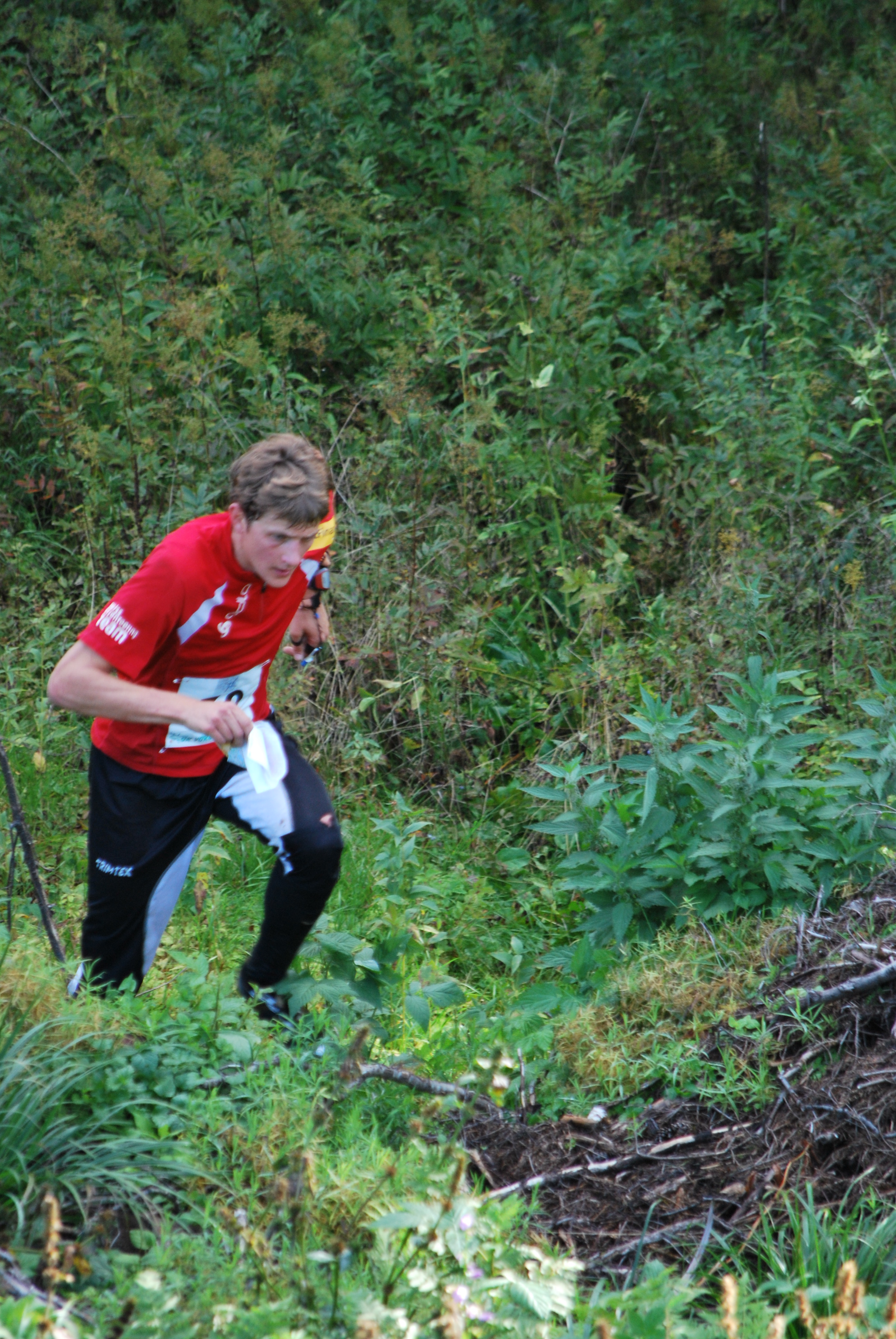
- Lauenstein in 2009

Medal record

Men's orienteering

Representing Switzerland

World Championships
Silver medal – second place	2005 Aichi	Long
Silver medal – second place	2006 Aarhus	Long
Bronze medal – third place	2005 Aichi	Relay

Marc Lauenstein (born September 15, 1980 in Cormondréche, Neuchâtel) is a Swiss orienteering competitor and runner. He received a silver medal on the long distance at the 2005 World Orienteering Championships in Aichi, and again in Aarhus in 2006. He earned a bronze medal in 2005 as a member of the Swiss relay team.

Lauenstein won the World Long Distance Mountain Running Challenge in 2009 at the Kaisermarathon. He won the Sierre-Zinal race in 2013, the Pikes Peak Marathon in 2014 and the Marathon du Mont Blanc in 2015.

In 2015, Lauenstein became the first runner to complete the Otter Run on South Africa's Otter Trail in under four hours.

He won the Three Peaks Race in 2016 in a time not far outside the long-standing course record, despite snowy conditions on the peaks. Later the same year, he won Giir di Mont from Premana on a route altered by bad weather and followed this with a victory at the Matterhorn Ultraks race in the Skyrunner World Series.
