= Mitja Kosovelj =

Slovenian mountain runner

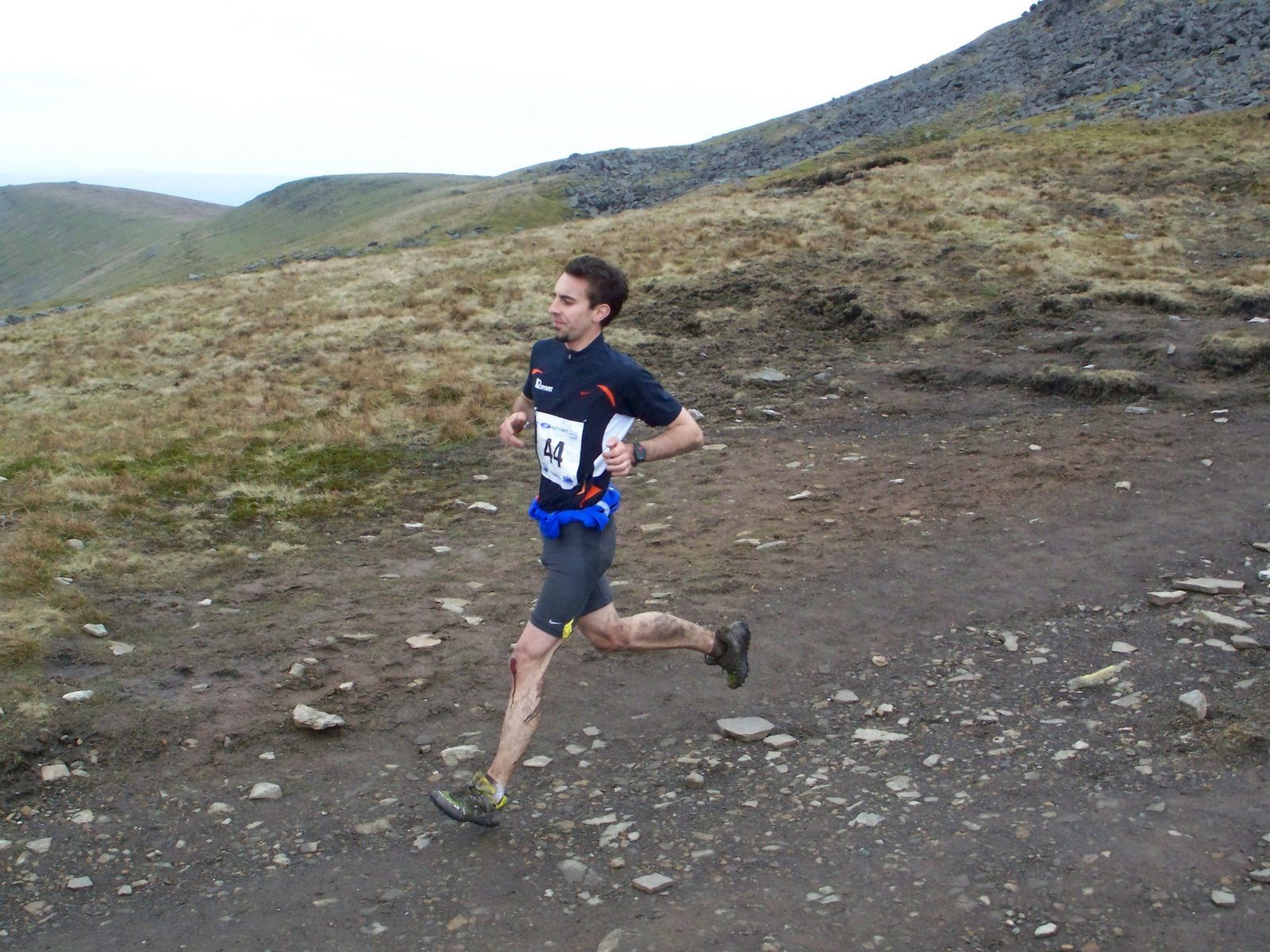

Personal information
- Nationality: Slovenian
- Born: 16 August 1984 (age 41) Slovenia

Sport
- Country: Slovenia
- Sport: Sport of athletics; Mountain running
- Event: Long-distance running

Achievements and titles
- Personal best: Half marathon: 1:04:04 (2014)
Medal record
Mountain running
Event	1st	2nd	3rd
World LD Championships (individual)	2	1	2
World LD Championships (team)	0	1	0
Total	2	2	2

Mitja Kosovelj (born 16 August 1984) is a Slovenian male mountain runner, twice world champion at the World Long Distance Mountain Running Championships (2011, 2013).

== Biography ==
Mitja Kosovelj won Dolomites SkyRace in 2016.
