= World Mountain Running Association =

International governing body for the sport of mountain running

Logo of the World Mountain Running Association

The World Mountain Running Association (WMRA), formerly the International Committee for Mountain Running, is the global governing body of mountain running.

For World Athletics purposes, mountain running takes place on terrain that is mainly off-road, but if there is significant elevation gain on the route, surfaced roads may be used. Courses involve considerable amounts of ascent (for mainly uphill races), or both ascent and descent (for up and down races with the start and finish at similar heights). The average incline is normally between five and twenty percent. Courses are clearly marked and should avoid dangerous sections.

== History ==
The WMRA was founded in 1984 as the International Committee for Mountain Running. In 1985, the organization staged the first annual World Mountain Running Trophy. In 1998, the name was changed to the World Mountain Running Association. In 2002, World Athletics (then the IAAF) officially recognised the World Trophy as an international competition. In 2009, the name was changed to the World Mountain Running Championships.

The WMRA also stages the annual World Long Distance Mountain Running Challenge and a World Cup series of races. Competitions are also held for Masters (veteran) and under 18 year old runners.

Starting from 2021 (the event postponed to 2022), a joint World Mountain and Trail Running Championships are held.

== Competitions ==
- World Mountain Running Championships
- World Long Distance Mountain Running Championships
- European Mountain Running Championships
- WMRA World Cup

== See also ==
- Fell running
- World Mountain Running Championships
- World Long Distance Mountain Running Championships
