= Mountain running =

Sports discipline

Mountain Running
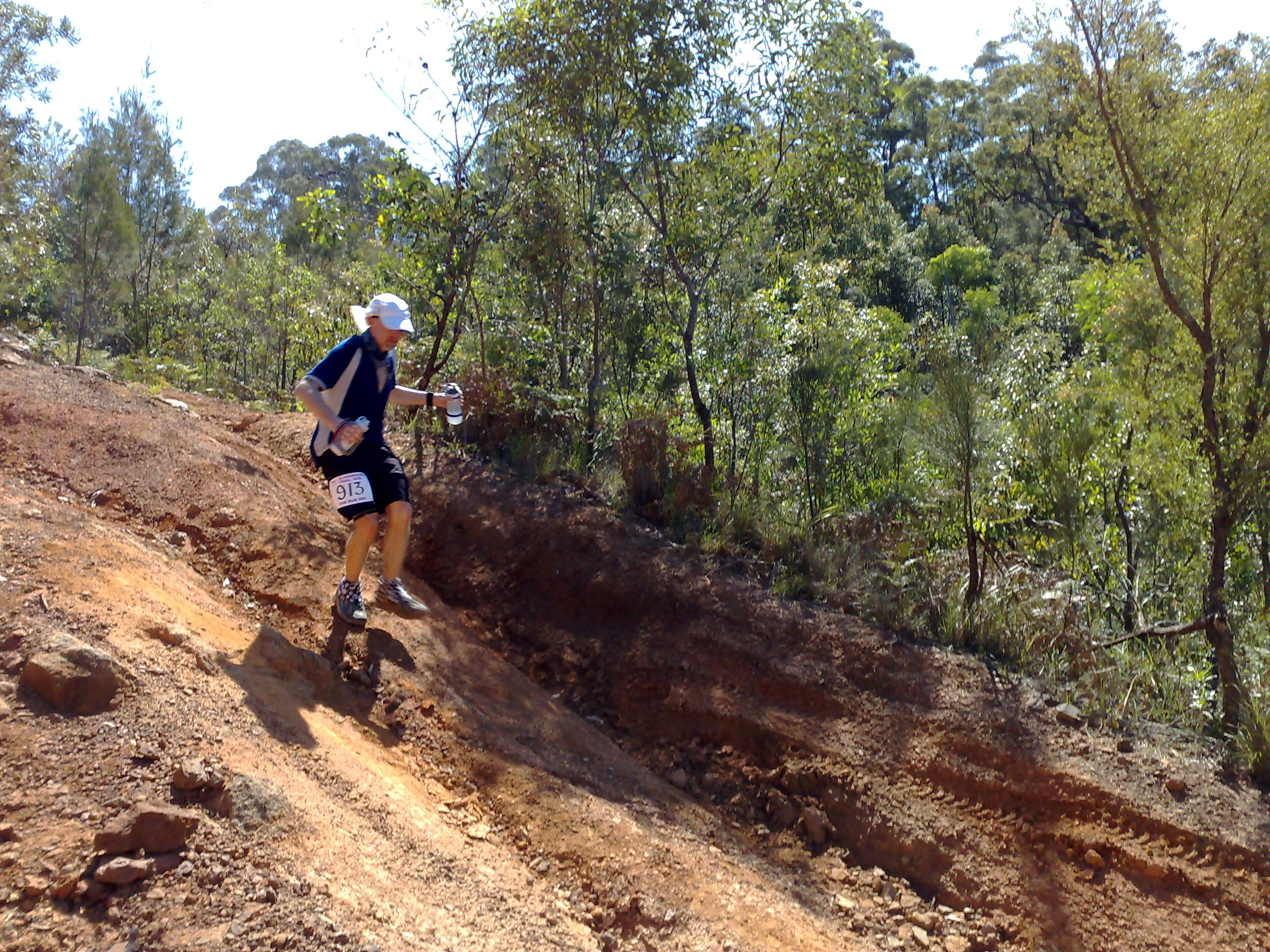
- A phase of a mountain running race in 2008.
- Highest governing body: World Athletics

Presence
- World Championships: 1985–

Mountain running is a sports discipline which takes place mainly off-road in mountainous terrain, but if there is significant elevation gain on the route, surfaced roads may be used. In this it differs from fell running; its courses are more clearly marked and avoid dangerous sections. It is a form of trail running if it is run on unpaved surfaces. Mountain running is a combination of running, jogging, and walking, depending on how steep the trail is.

It is recognized by World Athletics and governed by the World Mountain Running Association, which has been organising world championships since 1985.

== What is Mountain Running? ==
The World Mountain Running Association (WMRA) is the global governing body of mountain running. For World Athletics purposes, mountain running takes place on terrain that is mainly off-road, but if there is significant elevation gain on the route, surfaced roads may be used. Courses involve considerable amounts of ascent (for mainly uphill races), or both ascent and descent (for up and down races with the start and finish at similar heights). The average incline is normally between five and twenty percent. Courses are clearly marked and should avoid dangerous sections.

== World Championships ==
The WMRA co-organises a bi-annual world championships called the World Mountain and Trail Running Championships and was first held in Chiang Mai, Thailand in 2022. Until 2019, there was a standalone World Mountain Running Championships, also known for a time as the World Mountain Running Trophy; the World Long Distance Mountain Running Championships was discontinued in 2019 after the adoption of the new combined event.

== Mountain Running World Cup ==
The World Mountain Running Association runs an annual World Cup competition, which pulls together the best athletes in a series of the biggest and most prominent races in the sport. The Valsir Mountain Running World Cup usually takes place between July and October predominantly in Continental Europe. The series encompasses a variety of races in categories including; Classic (Up & Down), Vertical (Steep Uphill > 20%) and Long Distance Mountain Running with there usually being at least 3 races making up each category.

== See also ==
- Cross country running
- Fastpacking
- Mountain biking
- Skyrunning
