= 1992 World Mountain Running Trophy =

1992 World Mountain Running Championships
- Organisers: WMRA
- Edition: 8th
- Date: 30 August
- Host city: Val di Susa, Italy
- Events: 4

The 1992 World Mountain Running Championships was the 8th edition of the global mountain running competition, World Mountain Running Championships, organised by the World Mountain Running Association and was held in Val di Susa, Italy on 30 August 1992.

== Results ==
=== Men ===
Distance 14.67 km, difference in height 1394 m (climb), participants 93.

Rank	Athlete	Country	Time
1st place, gold medalist(s)	Helmut Schmuck	Austria	1:11:00
2nd place, silver medalist(s)	Jean Paul Payet	France	1:11:26
3rd place, bronze medalist(s)	Costantino Bertolla	Italy	1:11:47
4	Ladislav Raim	Czech Republic	1:12:00
5	Guido Dold	Germany	1:12:12
6	Robin Bryson	Ireland	1:12:40
7	Sylvain Richard	France	1:12:46
8	Marco Toini	Italy	1:12:54
9	Dave Dunham	United States	1:13:08
10	Florian Stern	Austria	1:13:25

=== Men team ===
Rank	Country	Athletes	Points
1st place, gold medalist(s)	France	Jean Paul Payet, Sylvain Richard, Jaime Mendes, Thierry Icart	21
2nd place, silver medalist(s)	Italy	Constantino Bertolla, Marco Toini, Claudio Amati, Fabio Ciaponi, Andrea Agostini	24
3rd place, bronze medalist(s)	Austria	Helmut Schmuck, Florian Stern, Rudolf Reitberger, Herbert Benedik, Andreas Stern	42

=== Men short distance ===
Distance 10.07 km, difference in height 810 m, participants 74.

Rank	Athlete	Country	Time
1st place, gold medalist(s)	Martin Jones	England	49:05
2nd place, silver medalist(s)	Renatus Birrer	Switzerland	49:48
3rd place, bronze medalist(s)	Robin Bergstrand	England	50:01
4	Colin Donnelly	Scotland	50:16
5	Davide Milesi	Italy	50:30
6	John Lenihan	Ireland	50:33
7	Neil Wilkinson	Scotland	50:56
8	Fausto Bonzi	Italy	51:09
9	Mark Croasdale	England	51:17
10	Michel Humbert	France	51:32

=== Men short distance team ===
Rank	Country	Athletes	Points
1st place, gold medalist(s)	England	Martin Jones, Robin Bergstrand, Mark Crosdale, Craig Roberts	13
2nd place, silver medalist(s)	Italy	Davide Milesi, Fausto Bonzi, Lucio Fregona, Giovanni Rossi, Batista Lizzoli	24
3rd place, bronze medalist(s)	Scotland	Colin Donnelly, Neil Wilkinson, Dermot Mc Gonigle, John Wilkinson	32

=== Men junior ===
Distance 7.44 km, difference in height 625 m, participants 57.

Rank	Athlete	Country	Time
1st place, gold medalist(s)	Maurizio Gemetto	Italy	35:30
2nd place, silver medalist(s)	Massimo Galliano	Italy	35:38
3rd place, bronze medalist(s)	Stephen Griffiths	Wales	36:54
4	William Styan	England	37:06
5	Roman Skalsky	Czech Republic	37:14
6	Patrick Heinlein	Germany	37:18
7	Dario Fracassi	Italy	37:19
8	John Books	Scotland	37:23
9	Philip Mowbray	Scotland	37:41
10	Craig Watson	England	38:07

=== Men junior team ===
Rank	Country	Athletes	Points
1st place, gold medalist(s)	Italy	Maurizio Gemetto, Massimo Galliano, Dario Fracassi, Gabriele De Nard	10
2nd place, silver medalist(s)	England	William Styan, Craig Watson, Mathew Whitfield, Nathan Mathews	25
3rd place, bronze medalist(s)	Scotland	John Books, Philip Mowbray, Hamish Hutchinson, Steven Cameron	34

=== Women ===
Distance 7.44 km, difference in height 625 m, participants 75.

Rank	Athlete	Country	Time
1st place, gold medalist(s)	Gudrun Pflüger	Austria	39:16
2nd place, silver medalist(s)	Sarah Rowell	England	40:37
3rd place, bronze medalist(s)	Sabine Stelzmüller	Austria	40:44
4	Louise Fairfax	Australia	41:09
5	Janet Kenyon	England	41:48
6	Patricia Calder	Scotland	41:15
7	Mariko Ducret	Switzerland	41:28
8	Annemarie Zingg	Switzerland	42:39
9	Elisabeth Rust	Austria	43:17
10	Antonella Molinari	Italy	43:28

=== Women team ===
Rank	Country	Athletes	Points
1st place, gold medalist(s)	Austria	Gudrun Pfluger, Sabine Stelzmueller, Elisabeth Rust, Anni Oberhofer, Ulrike Puchner	13
2nd place, silver medalist(s)	England	Sarah Rowell, Janet Kenyon, Clare Crofts, Caroline Hughes	23
3rd place, bronze medalist(s)	France	Odile Poirot, Odile Leveque, Martine Barra-Jarverzac, H. Evelyne Mura	44

=== Women junior ===
Junior women individual

Pos.	Atleta	Nazione	Tempo
1st place, gold medalist(s)	Rosita Rota Gelpi	Italy	20:49
2nd place, silver medalist(s)	Anna Baloghova	Czech Republic	21:21
3rd place, bronze medalist(s)	Mari Todd	Wales	22:25
4	Szofia Czene	Hungary	22:34
5	Stefania Cagnoli	Italy	22:55
6	Tamara Dalla Rosa	Italy	23:05
7	Simona Bonaiti	Italy	23:24
8	Szofia Szabo	Hungary	23:40
9	Cornelia Heinzle	Austria	23:43
10	Ann Hobenstein	Germany	23:47

=== Women junior team ===
Pos.	Squadra	Punti
1st place, gold medalist(s)	Italy	12
2nd place, silver medalist(s)	Hungary	23
3rd place, bronze medalist(s)	Czech Republic	33
