= 1990 World Mountain Running Trophy =

1990 World Mountain Running Championships
- Organisers: WMRA
- Edition: 6th
- Date: 15 September
- Host city: Telfes, Austria
- Events: 4

The 1990 World Mountain Running Championships was the 6th edition of the global mountain running competition, World Mountain Running Championships, organised by the World Mountain Running Association and was held in Telfes, Austria on 15 September 1990.

== Results ==
=== Men ===
Distance 14.3 km, difference in height 1550 m, participants 82.

Rank	Athlete	Country	Time
1st place, gold medalist(s)	Costantino Bertolla	Italy	1:15:27
2nd place, silver medalist(s)	Florian Stern	Austria	1:16:20
3rd place, bronze medalist(s)	Luigi Bortoluzzi	Italy	1:16:27
4	Peter Schatz	Austria	1:16:33
5	Jairo Correa	Colombia	1:16:55
6	Hans Jörg Randl	Austria	1:17:26
7	Fabio Ciaponi	Italy	1:18:12
8	Jean Paul Payet	France	1:18:15
9	Jay Johnson	United States	1:18:33
10	Wolfgang Münzel	West Germany	1:18:45

=== Men team ===
Rank	Team	Athletes	Points
1st place, gold medalist(s)	Italy	Constantino Bertolla, Luigi Bortoluzzi, Fabio Ciaponi, Privato Pezzoli	11
2nd place, silver medalist(s)	Austria	Florian Stern, Peter Schatz, Hans Jorg Randl, Karl Zisser	12
3rd place, bronze medalist(s)	West Germany	Wolfgang Munzel, Charly Doll, Dirk Debertin, Helmut Strobl	39

=== Men short distance ===
Distance 9.63 km, difference in height 765 m, participants 67.

Rank	Athlete	Country	Time
1st place, gold medalist(s)	Severino Bernardini	Italy	41:56
2nd place, silver medalist(s)	Fausto Bonzi	Italy	42:10
3rd place, bronze medalist(s)	Lucio Fregona	Italy	42:26
4	Dieter Ranftl	West Germany	43:12
5	Bashir Hussain	England	43:14
6	Robin Bergstrand	England	43:45
7	Giovanni Rossi	Italy	43:54
8	Michael Chramov	Russia	44:33
9	Colin Donnelly	Scotland	44:34
10	Renatus Birrer	Switzerland	44:40

=== Men short distance team ===
Rank	Country	Athletes	Points
1st place, gold medalist(s)	Italy	Severino Bernardini, Fausto Bonzi, Lucio Fregona, Giovanni Rossi	6
2nd place, silver medalist(s)	England	Bashir Hussain, Robin Bergstrand, Andy Peace, Gary Devine	23
3rd place, bronze medalist(s)	West Germany	Dieter Ranftl, Heiko Schinkitz, Manfred Dusold, Robert Manz	32

=== Men junior ===
Distance 7.88 km, difference in height 530 m, participants 52.

Rank	Athlete	Country	Time
1st place, gold medalist(s)	Markus Kröll	Austria	33:40
2nd place, silver medalist(s)	Gavin Bland	England	33:49
3rd place, bronze medalist(s)	Ulrich Steidl	West Germany	33:55
4	Yuri Tschurakow	Russia	34:08
5	Danilo Bosio	Italy	34:22
6	Mark Rice	England	34:25
7	Christian Nemeth	Belgium	34:28
8	Wladimir Golias	Russia	34:30
9	Simone Pagani	Italy	34:34
10	Colin De Burca	Ireland	34:42

=== Men junior team ===
Rank	Team	Athletes	Points
1st place, gold medalist(s)	Russia	Yurij Tschurakow, Wladimir Golias, Sergei Bondarenko, Vladimir Soludchik	24
2nd place, silver medalist(s)	Italy	Danilo Bosio, Simone Pagani, Alfio Rovelli, Filippo Marchessi	27
3rd place, bronze medalist(s)	England	Gavin Bland, Mark Rice, Gerard Cudahy, William Styan	29

=== Women ===
Distance 7.88 km, difference in height 530 m, participants 67.

Rank	Athlete	Country	Time
1st place, gold medalist(s)	Beverley Redfern	Scotland	36:36
2nd place, silver medalist(s)	Maria Cocchetti	Italy	37:35
3rd place, bronze medalist(s)	Eroica Spiess	Switzerland	37:54
4	Rumyana Panovska	Bulgaria	38:04
5	Sarah Rowell	England	38:15
6	Isabelle Guillot	France	38:24
7	Elisabeth Rust	Austria	38:38
8	Antonella Molinari	Italy	38:46
9	Mariko Ducret	Switzerland	39:01
10	Gaby Schütz	Switzerland	39:28

=== Women team ===
Rank	Country	Athletes	Points
1st place, gold medalist(s)	Switzerland	Eroica Spiess, Maria Ducret, Gaby Schuetz, Helen Eschler	22
2nd place, silver medalist(s)	Italy	Maria Cocchetti, Antonella Molinari, Guidina Dal Sasso, Giuliana Savaris	25
3rd place, bronze medalist(s)	Scotland	Beverly Redfern, Patricia Caldef, Joyce Salvona, Jane Robertson	30
