= 1996 World Mountain Running Trophy =

1996 World Mountain Running Championships
- Organisers: WMRA
- Edition: 12th
- Date: 1 September
- Host city: Telfes, Austria
- Events: 6

The 1996 World Mountain Running Championships was the 12th edition of the global mountain running competition, World Mountain Running Championships, organised by the World Mountain Running Association and was held in Telfes, Austria on 1 September 1996.

== Results ==
=== Men ===
Distance 11.0 km, difference in height 1310 m, participants 134.

Rank	Athlete	Country	Time
1st place, gold medalist(s)	Antonio Molinari	Italy	56:21
2nd place, silver medalist(s)	Severino Bernardini	Italy	58:42
3rd place, bronze medalist(s)	Helmut Schmuck	Austria	59:25
4	Peter Schatz	Austria	59:27
5	Aaron Strong	New Zealand	59:28
6	Lucio Fregona	Italy	59:33
7	Jean Paul Payet	France	59:36
8	Ladislav Raim	Czech Republic	59:42
9	Andy Peace	England	59:45
10	Tommy Murray	Scotland	1:00:14

=== Men team ===
Rank	Country	Athletes	Points
1st place, gold medalist(s)	Italy	Antonio Molinari, Severino Bernardini, Lucio Fregona, Massimo Galliano, Constantino Bertolla, Claudio Amati	24
2nd place, silver medalist(s)	Austria	Helmut Schmuck, Peter Schatz, Markus Kroll, Juergen Plechinger, Alexander Rieder, Hubert Resch	57
3rd place, bronze medalist(s)	France	Jean Paul Payet, Jaime De Jesus Mendes, Thierry Icart, Dominique Chauvelier, Thierry Breuil, Thierry Faveaux, Philippe Sirieix	65

=== Men junior ===
Distance 7.25 km, difference in height 785 m, participants 63.

Rank	Athlete	Country	Time
1st place, gold medalist(s)	Marco De Gasperi	Italy	37:31
2nd place, silver medalist(s)	Alberto Mosca	Italy	38:27
3rd place, bronze medalist(s)	Jerome Van de Meersche	Belgium	38:47
4	Lukas Eberle	Switzerland	38:52
5	Martin Bialek	Slovakia	38:54
6	Petr Losman	Czech Republic	38:59
7	Tim Davies	Wales	39:17
8	Emanuele Manzi	Italy	39:27
9	Manuel Desch	Austria	39:40
10	Keiran Lynch	Ireland	39:42

=== Men junior team ===
Rank	Country	Athletes	Point
1st place, gold medalist(s)	Italy	Marco De Gasperi, Alberto Mosca, Emanuele Manzi, Paolo Germanetto	11
2nd place, silver medalist(s)	Wales	Tim Davies, Andrew Davies, Alun Vaughan, Matthew Collins	35
3rd place, bronze medalist(s)	Switzerland	Lukas Eberle, Dominic Hasler, Christof Hefti, Patrick Lanz	38

=== Women ===
Distance 7.25 km, difference in height 785 m (climb), participants 75.

Rank	Athlete	Country	Time
1st place, gold medalist(s)	Gudrun Pflüger	Austria	40:56
2nd place, silver medalist(s)	Isabelle Guillot	France	41:09
3rd place, bronze medalist(s)	Catherine Lallemand	Belgium	41:18
4	Izabela Zatorska	Poland	41:39
5	Flavia Gaviglio	Italy	41:52
6	Heather Heasman	England	42:21
7	Rosita Rota Gelpi	Italy	42:38
8	Martine Javerzac P.	France	42:53
9	Evelyne Mura H.	France	43:22
10	Angie Hulley	England	43:27

=== Women team ===
Rank	Country	Athletes	Points
1st place, gold medalist(s)	France	Isabelle Guillot, Martine Javerzac, Evelyne Mura, Stephanie Manel	19
2nd place, silver medalist(s)	Italy	Flavia Gaviglio, Rosita Rota Gelpi, Maria Grazia Roberti, Matilde Ravizza	23
3rd place, bronze medalist(s)	England	Haether Heasman, Angie Hulley, Ann Buckley, Jo Dunstan	29
