= 1988 World Mountain Running Trophy =

International competition in England

- Organisers: WMRA
- Edition: 4th
- Date: 15 October
- Host city: Keswick, Cumbria, England
- Events: 4

The 1988 World Mountain Running Trophy was the 4th edition of the global mountain running competition, World Mountain Running Championships, organised by the World Mountain Running Association and was held in Keswick, Cumbria, England on 15 October 1988.

== Results ==
=== Men ===
Distance 14 km (8.7 mi). Difference in height 1,185 m (3,888 ft). Participants 49.

Rank	Athlete	Country	Time
1st place, gold medalist(s)	Dino Tadello	Italy	1:08:53
2nd place, silver medalist(s)	Davide Milesi	Italy	1:09:32
3rd place, bronze medalist(s)	Rod Pilbeam	England	1:09:39
4	Luigi Bortoluzzi	Italy	1:10:12
5	Colin Donnelly	Scotland	1:10:25
6	Georges Lischer	Switzerland	1:10:44
7	Marc Bovier	Switzerland	1:11:16
8	Malcom Petterson	England	1:11:40
9	Franci Teraz	Yugoslavia	1:11:55
10	Privato Pezzoli	Italy	1:12:19

=== Men team ===
Rank	Country	Athletes	Points
1st place, gold medalist(s)	Italy	Dino Tadello, Davide Milesi, Luigi Bortoluzzi, Privato Pezzoli	7
2nd place, silver medalist(s)	England	Rod Pilbeam, Malcom Petterson, Shaun Livesey, Gary Devine	25
3rd place, bronze medalist(s)	Switzerland	Georges Lischer, Marc Bovier, Gdy Fassler, Ruedi Bucher	28

=== Men short distance ===
Distance 10.0 km, difference in height 595 m, participants 50.

Rank	Athlete	Country	Time
1st place, gold medalist(s)	Alfonso Vallicella	Italy	44:25
2nd place, silver medalist(s)	Hanspeter Näpflin	Switzerland	45:00
3rd place, bronze medalist(s)	Wolfgang Münzel	West Germany	45:07
4	Lucio Fregona	Italy	45:15
5	Robin Bergstrand	England	45:20
6	Claudio Galeazzi	Italy	45:24
7	Fausto Bonzi	Italy	45:36
8	Franci Teraz	Yugoslavia	45:39
9	Ray Owen	England	45:49
10	Florian Stern	Austria	46:06

=== Men short distance team ===
Rank	Country	Athletes	Points
1st place, gold medalist(s)	Italy	Alfonso Vallicella, Lucio Fregona, Claudio Galeazzi, Fausto Bonzi	11
2nd place, silver medalist(s)	Switzerland	Peter Naepflin, Renatus Birrer, Franz Naepflin, Daniel Oppliger	25
3rd place, bronze medalist(s)	England	Robin Bergstrand, Ray Owen, Dave Cartridge, Paul Dugdale	27

=== Men junior ===
Distance 7.5 km, difference in height 420 m, participants 35.

Rank	Athlete	Country	Time
1st place, gold medalist(s)	Woody Schoch	Switzerland	34:22
2nd place, silver medalist(s)	Mark Rice	England	34:34
3rd place, bronze medalist(s)	John Taylor	England	34:41
4	Fausto Lizzoli	Italy	35:21
5	Martin Schöpfer	Switzerland	35:35
6	Reto Sutter	Switzerland	35:40
7	Mario Poletti	Italy	35:46
8	Marzell Parpan	Switzerland	36:07
9	Andrea Agostini	Italy	36:18
10	Geoff Hall	England	36:38

=== Men junior team ===
Rank	Country	Athletes	Points
1st place, gold medalist(s)	Switzerland	Woody Schoch, Martin Schofer, Retto Sutter, Marzel Parpan	12
2nd place, silver medalist(s)	England	Mark Rice, John Taylor, Geoff Hall	15
3rd place, bronze medalist(s)	Italy	Fausto Lizzoli, Mario Poletti, Andrea Agostini, Roberto Bonacorsi	20

=== Women ===
Distance 7.5 km, difference in height 420 m, participants 34.

Rank	Athlete	Country	Time
1st place, gold medalist(s)	Fabiola Rueda	Colombia	38:11
2nd place, silver medalist(s)	Gaby Schütz	Switzerland	39:24
3rd place, bronze medalist(s)	Isabelle Guillot	France	39:30
4	Giuliana Savaris	Italy	39:36
5	Grazia Magili	Italy	39:39
6	Angela Carson	Wales	40:02
7	Patricia Calder	Scotland	40:34
8	Christine Tischhauser	Switzerland	40:42
9	Irmgard Steiner	Switzerland	40:43
10	Maria Cocchetti	Italy	40:48

=== Women team ===
Rank	Country	Athletes	Points
1st place, gold medalist(s)	Switzerland	Gaby Schütz, Christine Tischhauser, Irmgard Steiner, Helen Eschler	19
2nd place, silver medalist(s)	Italy	Giuliana Savaris, Grazia Magili, Maria Cocchetti, Valentina Bottarelli	19
3rd place, bronze medalist(s)	Scotland	Patricia Calder, Penny Rother, Joyce Salvona, Barbara Murra	31
