= 1986 World Mountain Running Trophy =

1986 World Mountain Running Championships
- Organisers: WMRA
- Edition: 2nd
- Date: 5 October
- Host city: Morbegno, Italy
- Events: 4

The 1986 World Mountain Running Championships was the 2nd edition of the global mountain running competition, World Mountain Running Championships, organised by the World Mountain Running Association and was held in Morbegno, Italy on 5 October 1986.

== Results ==
=== Men individual ===
Distance 15.05 km, difference in height 1127 m, participants 53.

Rank	Athlete	Country	Time
1st place, gold medalist(s)	Alfonso Valicella	Italy	1:00:36
2nd place, silver medalist(s)	Helmut Stuhlpfarrer	Austria	1:01:07
3rd place, bronze medalist(s)	Charly Doll	West Germany	1:02:25
4	Beat Imhof	Switzerland	1:03:11
5	John Lenihan	Ireland	1:03:16
6	Costantino Bertolla	Italy	1:03:31
7	Privato Pezzoli	Italy	1:03:46
8	Luigi Bortoluzzi	Italy	1:03:49
9	Ruedi Bucher	Switzerland	1:04:01
10	Wolfgang Münzel	West Germany	1:04:47

=== Men team ===
Rank	Country	Athletes	Points
1st place, gold medalist(s)	Italy	Alfonso Valicella, Costantino Bertolla, Privato Pezzoli, Luigi Bortoluzzi	16
2nd place, silver medalist(s)	Switzerland	Beat Imhof, Ruedi Bucher, Peter Naepflin, Colombo Tramonti	28
3rd place, bronze medalist(s)	West Germany	Charly Doll, Wolfgang Munzel, Peter Zipfel, Rainhold Mayer, Siegfried Blum	30

=== Men short distance ===
Distance 10.95 km, difference in height 480 m, participants 44.

Rank	Athlete	Country	Time
1st place, gold medalist(s)	Maurizio Simonetti	Italy	45:37
2nd place, silver medalist(s)	Fausto Bonzi	Italy	45:57
3rd place, bronze medalist(s)	Renato Gotti	Italy	46:40
4	Pier Alberto Tassi	Italy	47:04
5	Vito Cornolti	Italy	47:23
6	Davide Milesi	Italy	47:35
7	Rob Pilbeam	England	47:40
8	Lucio Fregona	Italy	47:49
9	Daniel Oppliger	Switzerland	47:59
10	Dave Cartridge	England	48:02

=== Men short distance team ===
Rank	Country	Athletes	Points
1st place, gold medalist(s)	Italy	Maurizio Simonetti, Fausto Bonzi, Pier Alberto Tassi, Vito Carnoltti	7
2nd place, silver medalist(s)	Italy 2	Renato Gotti, Davide Milesi, Lucio Fregona, Batista Lizzoli	17
3rd place, bronze medalist(s)	England	Rod Pilbeam, Dave Cartridge, Shaun Livesey, Ray Rawlinson	35

=== Men junior individual ===
Distance 7.35 km, difference in height 260 m, participants 29.

Rank	Athlete	Country	Time
1st place, gold medalist(s)	Franco Naitza	Italy	29:55
2nd place, silver medalist(s)	Robin Bergstrand	England	30:12
3rd place, bronze medalist(s)	Ezio Chappoz	Italy	30:36
4	Emiliano Milesi	Italy	30:38
5	Michael Steiner	Switzerland	31:13
6	Davide Zubiani	Italy	31:14
7	Antonio Molinari	Italy	31:15
8	Giacomino Lizzoli	Italy	31:16
9	Martial Cuendet	Switzerland	31:45
10	Heinz Fellner	Austria	31:55

=== Men junior team ===
Rank	Country	Athletes	Points
1st place, gold medalist(s)	Italy	Franco Naitza, Ezio Chappoz, Emiliano Milesi, Antonio Molinari	8
2nd place, silver medalist(s)	England	Robin Bergstrand, Ian Dermott, Gary Devine, Andrew Jones	27
3rd place, bronze medalist(s)	Italy 2	Davide Zubiani, Giacomino Lizzoli, Ivo Locatelli, Mario Creazzi	28

=== Women individual ===
Distance 7.35 km, difference in height 260 m, participants 30.

Rank	Athlete	Country	Time
1st place, gold medalist(s)	Carol Haigh	England	34:14
2nd place, silver medalist(s)	Valentina Bottarelli	Italy	34:59
3rd place, bronze medalist(s)	Gaby Schütz	Switzerland	35:22
4	Helene Eschler	Switzerland	36:05
5	Anelise Weber	West Germany	36:07
6	Lucia Soranzo	Italy	36:22
7	Karin Möbes	Switzerland	36:22
8	Tatjana Smolnikar	Yugoslavia	36:33
9	Sonia Basso	Italy	36:33
10	Gemma Gaddo	Italy	37:27

=== Women team ===
Rank	Country	Athletes	Points
1st place, gold medalist(s)	Switzerland	Gaby Schütz, Helene Eschler, Karin Möbes, Daniela Salvi	14
2nd place, silver medalist(s)	Italy	Valentina Bottarelli, Lucia Soranzo, Sonia Basso, Gemma Gaddo	17
3rd place, bronze medalist(s)	West Germany	Annelise Weber, Susanne Bitzer, Paula Mangold, Christine Fladt	21
