= 1989 World Mountain Running Trophy =

1989 World Mountain Running Championships
- Organisers: WMRA
- Edition: 5th
- Date: 16 September
- Host city: Châtillon-en-Diois, France
- Events: 4

The 1989 World Mountain Running Championships was the 5th edition of the global mountain running competition, World Mountain Running Championships, organised by the World Mountain Running Association and was held in Châtillon-en-Diois, France on 16 September 1989.

== Results ==
=== Men ===
Distance 16.38 km, difference in height 1130 m, participants 61.

Rank	Athlete	Country	Time
1st place, gold medalist(s)	Jairo Correa	Colombia	1:11:37
2nd place, silver medalist(s)	Costantino Bertolla	Italy	1:13:17
3rd place, bronze medalist(s)	Luigi Bortoluzzi	Italy	1:14:06
4	Mohamed Youkmane	Algeria	1:14:35
5	Urs Hanhart	Switzerland	1:15:10
6	Jean Paul Payet	France	1:16:10
7	Fabio Ciaponi	Italy	1:16:17
8	Florian Stern	Austria	1:16:21
9	Marc Bovier	Switzerland	1:16:41
10	Jack Maitland	Scotland	1:16:44

=== Men team ===
Rank	Team	Athletes	Points
1st place, gold medalist(s)	Italy	Constantino Bertolla, Luigi Bortoluzzi, Fabio Ciaponi	12
2nd place, silver medalist(s)	Switzerland	Urs Hanhart, Marc Bovier, Georg Uscher	33
3rd place, bronze medalist(s)	France	Jean Paul Payet, Aziz Nih, Aime Arnaud, Abdel Guerranselgoum	35

=== Men short distance ===
Distance 10.04 km, difference in height 695 m, participants 53.

Rank	Athlete	Country	Time
1st place, gold medalist(s)	Fausto Bonzi	Italy	46:00
2nd place, silver medalist(s)	Colin Donnelly	Scotland	47:20
3rd place, bronze medalist(s)	Martin May	Switzerland	47:59
4	Claudio Galeazzi	Italy	48:07
5	Lucio Fregona	Italy	48:38
6	John Leniham	Northern Ireland	48:53
7	Jeff Hornby	England	49:30
8	Wolfgang Münzel	West Germany	47:49
9	Hefin Griffiths	Wales	49:55
10	Ruedi Bucher	Switzerland	50:04

=== Men short distance team ===
Rank	Country	Athletes	Points
1st place, gold medalist(s)	Italy	Fausto Bonzi, Claudio Galeazzi, Lucio Fregona, Gianni Vello	10
2nd place, silver medalist(s)	Switzerland	Martin May, Ruedi Bucher, Franz Naepflin	27
3rd place, bronze medalist(s)	Scotland	Colin Donnelly, Brian Potts, John Wilkinson, Ian Davidson	29

=== Men junior ===
Distance 7.7 km, difference in height 460 m, participants 43.

Rank	Athlete	Country	Time
1st place, gold medalist(s)	Andrea Agostini	Italy	34:25
2nd place, silver medalist(s)	Martin Schöpfer	Switzerland	35:39
3rd place, bronze medalist(s)	Ivan Paragoni	Italy	35:56
4	Giovanni Gallo	Switzerland	36:12
5	Urs Wenk	Switzerland	36:26
6	Gerard Cudahy	England	36:58
7	Gavin Bland	England	37:03
8	Alfio Rovelli	Italy	37:15
9	Orlando Zappella	Italy	37:12
10	Reto Sutter	Switzerland	37:32

=== Men junior team ===
Rank	Team	Athletes	Points
1st place, gold medalist(s)	Switzerland	Martin Schofer, Giovanni Gallo, Urs Venk, Retto Sutter	11
2nd place, silver medalist(s)	Italy	Andrea Agostini, Ivani Paragoni, Alfio Rovelli, Orlando Zappella	12
3rd place, bronze medalist(s)	England	Gerard Cudahy, Gavin Bland, Steven Brooks	25

=== Women ===
Distance 7.7 km, difference in height 460 m, participants 53.

Rank	Athlete	Country	Time
1st place, gold medalist(s)	Isabelle Guillot	France	38:24
2nd place, silver medalist(s)	Fabiola Rueda	Colombia	38:55
3rd place, bronze medalist(s)	Manuela Di Centa	Italy	39:04
4	Sarah Rowell	England	39:21
5	Christine Faure	France	39:26
6	Patricia Calder	Scotland	39:33
7	Maria Cocchetti	Italy	39:51
8	Yvonne Mc Gregor	England	40:16
9	Else Pairen	Belgium	40:49
10	Janet Darby	England	40:54

=== Women team ===
Rank	Team	Athletes	Points
1st place, gold medalist(s)	Italy	Manuella Di Centa, Maria Cochetti, Giuliana Savaris, Maria Grazia Roberti	21
2nd place, silver medalist(s)	England	Sarah Rowell, Yvonne Mc Gregor, Janet Darby, Clare Crofts	22
3rd place, bronze medalist(s)	France	Isabelle Guillot, Christine Faure, Patricia Romany, Dominique Duchene	25
