= World Mountain Running Championships =

- Sport: Mountain Running
- Founded: World Mountain Running Association (WMRA)
- First season: 1985
- Most recent champions: Joseph Gray (men); Grayson Murphy (women)
- Most titles: 6 Jonathan Wyatt (men); 6 Andrea Mayr (women)
- Website: wmra.ch

The World Mountain Running Championships (World Mountain Running Trophy until 2008), is an international mountain running competition contested by athletes of the members of WMRA, World Mountain Running Association, the sport's global governing body.

The championships include a senior men, senior women, junior men and women events and the team events of these races.

It was first held in 1985 as the World Mountain Running Trophy before obtaining its current moniker in 2009.

The 2020 championships, which were scheduled for 13–14 November in Haria, Lanzarote, Spain, were cancelled due to the COVID-19 pandemic.

The 2021 World Mountain and Trail Running Championships (abbreviated WMTRC 2021), held in Chiang Mai, Thailand, from November 4–6, 2022, combined the World Mountain Running Championships and IAU Trail World Championships into a new event, the World Mountain and Trail Running Championships.

== Editions ==
Edition	Year	City	Country	Date
1st	1985	San Vigilio di Marebbe, Südtirol	Italy	23 September
2nd	1986	Morbegno - Sondrio - Albosaggia, Lombardia	Italy	5 October
3rd	1987	Lenzerheide - Valbella, Graubünden	Switzerland	23 August
4th	1988	Keswick, Cumbria	England	15 October
5th	1989	Die - Châtillon-en-Diois, Drôme	France	16 September
6th	1990	Telfes, Tirol	Austria	15 September
7th	1991	Zermatt, Valais	Switzerland	8 September
8th	1992	Valle di Susa, Piemonte	Italy	30 August
9th	1993	Gap, Hautes-Alpes	France	5 September
10th	1994	Berchtesgaden, Bayern	Germany	4 September
11th	1995	Edinburgh	Scotland	10 September
12th	1996	Telfes, Tirol	Austria	1 September
13th	1997	Úpice - Malé Svatoňovice, Hradec Králové	Czech Republic	7 September
14th	1998	Dimitile, Réunion	France	20 September
15th	1999	Mount Kinabalu Park, Sabah	Malaysia	19 September
16th	2000	Bergen, Bayern	Germany	10 September
17th	2001	Arta Terme, Friuli-Venezia Giulia	Italy	16 September
18th	2002	Innsbruck, Tirol	Austria	15 September
19th	2003	Girdwood, Alaska	United States	20 September
20th	2004	Sauze d'Oulx, Piemonte	Italy	4 September
21st	2005	Wellington	New Zealand	25 September
22nd	2006	Bursa	Turkey	10 September
23rd	2007	Ovronnaz, Valais	Switzerland	15 September
24th	2008	Sierre - Crans Montana, Valais	Switzerland	14 September
25th	2009	Madesimo - Campodolcino, Lombardia	Italy	6 September
26th	2010	Kamnik - Velika Planina, Gorenjska	Slovenia	5 September
27th	2011	Tirana	Albania	11 September
28th	2012	Temù - Ponte di Legno, Lombardia	Italy	2 September
29th	2013	Krynica-Zdrój, Małopolska	Poland	8 September
30th	2014	Casette di Massa, Tuscany	Italy	14 September
31st	2015	Betws-y-Coed	Wales	19 September
32nd	2016	Sapareva Banya, Kyustendil	Bulgaria	11 September
33rd	2017	Premana, Lombardy	Italy	30 July
34th	2018	Canillo	Andorra	16 September
35th	2019	Villa La Angostura, Los Lagos	Argentina	15 November
36th & 1st (incl. Trail)	2021 (hosted in 2022)	Chiang Mai, Chiang Mai province	Thailand	4-6 November
37th & 2nd (incl. Trail)	2023	Innsbruck-Stubai Alps, Tyrol	Austria	7-10 June
38th & 3rd (incl. Trail)	2025	Canfranc, Aragon	Spain	25-28 September

== Medals ==
=== Men ===
Year	Gold	Silver	Bronze
1985	(Italy) Alfonso Vallicella	(Austria) Helmut Stuhlpfarrer	(Italy) Fausto Bonzi
1986	(Italy) Alfonso Vallicella	(Austria) Helmut Stuhlpfarrer	(West Germany) Karl-Heinz Doll
1987	(United States) Jay Johnson	(Austria) Helmut Stuhlpfarrer	(West Germany) Guido Dold
1988	(Italy) Dino Tadello	(Italy) Davide Milesi	(England) Rod Pilbeam
1989	(Colombia) Jairo Correa	(Italy) Costantino Bertolla	(Italy) Luigi Bortoluzzi
1990	(Italy) Costantino Bertolla	(Austria) Florian Stern	(Italy) Luigi Bortoluzzi
1991	(Colombia) Jairo Correa	(France) Jean-Paul Payet	(Colombia) Francisco Sánchez
1992	(Austria) Helmut Schmuck	(France) Jean-Paul Payet	(Italy) Costantino Bertolla
1993	(England) Martin Jones	(United States) Dave Dunham	(France) Michel Humbert
1994	(Austria) Helmut Schmuck	(Italy) Antonio Molinari	(Czech Republic) Ladislav Raim
1995	(Italy) Lucio Fregona	(Scotland) Tommy Murray	(Italy) Marco Toini
1996	(Italy) Antonio Molinari	(Italy) Severino Bernardini	(Austria) Helmut Schmuck
1997	(Italy) Marco De Gasperi	(Italy) Davide Milesi	(France) Thierry Breuil
1998	(New Zealand) Jonathan Wyatt	(Italy) Antonio Molinari	(Germany) Guido Dold
1999	(Italy) Marco De Gasperi	(England) Richard Findlow	(Italy) Gino Caneva
2000	(New Zealand) Jonathan Wyatt	(Austria) Hans Kogler	(Switzerland) Alexis Gex-Fabry
2001	(Italy) Marco De Gasperi	(Italy) Emanuele Manzi	(England) Billy Burns
2002	(New Zealand) Jonathan Wyatt	(France) Raymond Fontaine	(Mexico) Ranulfo Sánchez
2003	(Italy) Marco De Gasperi	(Austria) Florian Heinzle	(Italy) Marco Gaiardo
2004	(New Zealand) Jonathan Wyatt	(Eritrea) Tesfayouhanis Mesfin	(France) Raymond Fontaine
2005	(New Zealand) Jonathan Wyatt	(Italy) Gabriele Abate	(Italy) Davide Chicco
2006	(Colombia) Rolando Ortiz	(New Zealand) Jonathan Wyatt	(Eritrea) Tesfay Felfele
2007	(Italy) Marco De Gasperi	(Eritrea) Yohannes Tesfay	(Eritrea) Ermias Tesfazghi
2008	(New Zealand) Jonathan Wyatt	(Uganda) Martin Toroitich	(Turkey) Ahmet Arslan
2009	(Uganda) Geofrey Kusuro	(Eritrea) Azeria Teklay	(Uganda) James Kibet
2010	(Eritrea) Samson Gashazghi	(Eritrea) Azeria Teklay	(Uganda) Geoffrey Kusuro
2011	(United States) Max King	(Turkey) Ahmet Arslan	(Italy) Martin Dematteis
2012	(Eritrea) Petro Mamu	(Eritrea) Azeria Teklay	(Russia) Andrey Safronov
2013	(Uganda) Phillip Kiplimo	(Uganda) Geffrey Kusuro	(Uganda) Nathan Ayeko
2014	(Uganda) Isaac Kiprop	(Uganda) Daniel Rotich	(Uganda) Kibet Soyekwo
2015	(Uganda) Fred Musobo	(Italy) Bernard Dematteis	(United Kingdom) Robbie Simpson
2016	(United States) Joseph Gray	(Mexico) Israel Morales	(Turkey) Ahmet Arslan
2017	(Uganda) Victor Kiplangat	(Uganda) Joel Ayeko	(Uganda) Fred Musobo
2018	(Uganda) Robert Chemonges	(Uganda) Joel Ayeko	(Uganda) Victor Kiplangat
2019	(United States) Joseph Gray	(Italy) Cesare Maestri	(Czech Republic) Marek Chrascina

=== Women ===
Year	Gold	Silver	Bronze
1985	(West Germany) Olivia Grüner	(Italy) Chiara Saporetti	(Italy) Guidina Dal Sasso
1986	(England) Carol Haigh	(Italy) Valentina Bottarelli	(Switzerland) Gaby Schütz
1987	(Colombia) Fabiola Rueda	(West Germany) Christiane Fladt	(Italy) Guiliana Savaris
1988	(Colombia) Fabiola Rueda	(Switzerland) Gaby Schütz	(France) Isabelle Guillot
1989	(France) Isabelle Guillot	(Colombia) Fabiola Rueda	(Italy) Manuela Di Centa
1990	(Scotland) Beverley Redfern	(Italy) Maria Cocchetti	(Switzerland) Eroica Spiess
1991	(France) Isabelle Guillot	(Italy) Manuela Di Centa	(France) Annie Mougel
1992	(Austria) Gudrun Pflüger	(England) Sarah Rowell	(Austria) Sabine Stelzmüller
1993	(France) Isabelle Guillot	(Austria) Gudrun Pflüger	(England) Carol Greenwood
1994	(Austria) Gudrun Pflüger	(France) Isabelle Guillot	(Czech Republic) Dita Hebelková
1995	(Austria) Gudrun Pflüger	(France) Isabelle Guillot	(Italy) Nives Curti
1996	(Austria) Gudrun Pflüger	(France) Isabelle Guillot	(Belgium) Catherine Lallemand
1997	(France) Isabelle Guillot	(Slovakia) Jaroslava Bukvajová	(New Zealand) Melissa Moon
1998	(Czech Republic) Dita Hebelková	(Italy) Matilda Ravizza	(New Zealand) Melissa Moon
1999	(Italy) Rosita Rota Gelpi	(Poland) Izabela Zatorska	(New Zealand) Maree Bunce
2000	(Scotland) Angela Mudge	(Germany) Birgit Sonntag	(Poland) Izabela Zatorska
2001	(New Zealand) Melissa Moon	(Czech Republic) Anna Pichrtová	(Poland) Izabela Zatorska
2002	(Russia) Svetlana Demidenko	(Italy) Antonella Confortola	(Poland) Izabela Zatorska
2003	(New Zealand) Melissa Moon	(Scotland) Angela Mudge	(Scotland) Tracey Brindley
2004	(Italy) Rosita Rota Gelpi	(Czech Republic) Anna Pichrtová	(Austria) Andrea Mayr
2005	(New Zealand) Kate McIlroy	(Scotland) Tracey Brindley	(Czech Republic) Anna Pichrtová
2006	(Austria) Andrea Mayr	(Switzerland) Martina Strähl	(France) Isabelle Guillot
2007	(Czech Republic) Anna Pichrtová	(Austria) Andrea Mayr	(United States) Laura Haefeli
2008	(Austria) Andrea Mayr	(Italy) Renate Rungger	(Italy) Elisa Desco
2009	(Italy) Valentina Belotti	(Italy) Maria Grazia Roberti	(United Kingdom) Sarah Tunstall
2010	(Austria) Andrea Mayr	(Italy) Valentina Belotti	(Switzerland) Martina Strähl
2011	(United States) Kasie Enman	(Russia) Elena Rukhlyada	(France) Marie Dumergues
2012	(Austria) Andrea Mayr	(Italy) Valentina Belotti	(United States) Morgan Arritola
2013	(Italy) Alice Gaggi	(United Kingdom) Emma Clayton	(Italy) Elisa Desco
2014	(Austria) Andrea Mayr	(Kenya) Lucy Murigi	(United States) Allison McLaughlin
2015	(Uganda) Stella Chesang	(United Kingdom) Emily Collinge	(United Kingdom) Emma Clayton
2016	(Austria) Andrea Mayr	(Italy) Valentina Belotti	(France) Christel Dewalle
2017	(Kenya) Lucy Murigi	(Austria) Andrea Mayr	(United Kingdom) Sarah Tunstall
2018	(Kenya) Lucy Murigi	(Switzerland) Maude Mathys	(Kenya) Viola Jelagat
2019	(United States) Grayson Murphy	(France) Élise Poncet	(United Kingdom) Phillipa Williams

- ^{nb} Italy's Elisa Desco was the original winner of the 2009 women's race but was later disqualified for erythropoietin (EPO).

=== Men's short race (defunct) ===
Year	Gold	Silver	Bronze
1985	(England) Kenny Stuart	(Italy) Maurizio Simonetti	(Italy) Luigi Bortoluzzi
1986	(Italy) Maurizio Simonetti	(Italy) Fausto Bonzi	(Italy) Renato Gotti
1987	(Italy) Fausto Bonzi	(Italy) Luigi Bortoluzzi	(Italy) Renato Gotti
1988	(Italy) Alfonso Vallicella	(Switzerland) Hanspeter Näpflin	(West Germany) Wolfgang Münzel
1989	(Italy) Fausto Bonzi	(Scotland) Colin Donnelly	(Switzerland) Martin May
1990	(Italy) Severino Bernardini	(Italy) Fausto Bonzi	(Italy) Lucio Fregona
1991	(Republic of Ireland) John Lenihan	(Switzerland) Marius Hasler	(Switzerland) Woody Schoch
1992	(England) Martin Jones	(Switzerland) Renatus Birrer	(England) Robin Bergstrand

Team winner

Year	Nation	Athletes
1985	Italy	Maurizio Simonetti, Luigi Bortoluzzi, Battista Scanzi, Stefano Visini
1986	Italy	Maurizio Simonetti, Fausto Bonzi, Renato Gotti, Pier Alberto Tassi
1987	Italy	Fausto Bonzi, Luigi Bortoluzzi, Renato Gotti, Alberto Tassi
1988	Italy	Alfonso Vallicella, Lucio Fregona, Claudio Galeazzi, Fausto Bonzi
1989	Italy	Fausto Bonzi, Claudio Galeazzi, Lucio Fregona
1990	Italy	Severino Bernardini, Fausto Bonzi, Lucio Fregona, Giovanni Rossi
1991	Switzerland	Marius Hasler, Woody Schoch, Renatus Birrer
1992	England	Martin Jones, Robin Bergstrand, Neil Wilkinson

=== Teams ===
In the team rankings, the score is scored considering the top three ranked for each nation (win the team with score fewer points, giving the score for the place scored). But medals are also assigned to the 4th eventual ranking of each country.

==== Men ====
Edition	Country	Athletes
1985	Italy	Alfonso Vallicella, Fausto Bonzi, Claudio Simi, Privato Pezzoli
1986	Italy	Alfonso Valicella, Costantino Bertolla, Privato Pezzoli. Luigi Bortoluzzi
1987	Italy	Pio Tomaselli, Privato Pezzoli, Alfonso Vallicella, Claudio Galeazzi
1988	Italy	Dino Tadello, Davide Milesi, Luigi Bortoluzzi, Privato Pezzoli
1989	Italy	Costantino Bertolla, Luigi Bortoluzzi, Fabio Ciaponi
1990	Italy	Costantino Bertolla, Luigi Bortoluzzi, Fabio Ciaponi, Privato Pezzoli
1991	Italy	Costantino Bertolla, Davide Milesi, Marco Toini, Bortolo Saio
1992	France	
1993	Italy	Costantino Bertolla, Adriano Pezzoli, Antonio Molinari, Fabio Ciaponi, Battista Lizzoli, Lucio Fregona
1994	Italy	Galdino Pilot, Costantino Bertolla, Claudio Amati, Andrea Agostini, Roberto Barbi
1995	Italy	Lucio Fregona, Marco Toin, Antonio Molinari, Andrea Agostini, Roberto Barbi, Gino Caneva
1996	Italy	Antonio Molinari, Severino Bernardini, Lucio Fregona, Massimo Galliano, Costantino Bertolla, Claudio Amati
1997	Italy	Marco De Gasperi, Davide Milesi, Lucio Fregona, Antonio Molinari, Carmelo Traini, Danilo Bosio
1998	Italy	Antonio Molinari, Davide Milesi, Massimo Galliano, Lucio Fregona, Marco De Gasperi
1999	Italy	Marco De Gasperi, Gino Caneva, Lucio Fregona, Antonio Molinari, Simone Lenzi
2000	Italy	Sergio Chiesa, Massimo Galliano, Antonio Molinari, Roberto Calandro, Marco De Gasperi, Davide Milesi
2001	Italy	Marco De Gasper, Emanuele Manzi, Lucio Fregona, Alessio Rinaldi, Antonio Molinari, Andrea Agostini
2002	Italy	Marco Gaiardo, Antonio Molinari, Marco De Gasperi, Emanuele Manzi, Davide Milesi, Alessio Rinaldi
2003	Italy	Marco De Gasperi, Marco Gaiardo, Emanuele Manzi, Claudio Cassi, Alessio Rinaldi, Marco Agostini
2004	Italy	Marco Gaiardo, Marco De Gasperi, Davide Chicco, Gabriele Abate, Roberto Porro, Antonio Molinari
2005	Italy	Gabriele Abate, Davide Chicco, Marco Gaiardo, Emanuele Manzi, Alessio Rinaldi, Antonio Molinari
2006	Eritrea	
2007	Italy	Marco De Gasperi, Marco GaiardovGabriele Abate, Andrea Regazzoni, Marco Rinaldi, Davide Chicco
2008	Italy	Bernard Dematteis, Marco De Gasperi, Marco GaiardovGabriele Abatev Hannes Rungger, Emanuele Manzi
2009	Eritrea	
2010	Eritrea	
2011	Italy	Martin Dematteis, Bernard Dematteis, Marco De Gasperi, Gabriele Abate, Emanuele Manzi, Alex Baldaccini
2012	Eritrea	
2013	Uganda	
2014	Uganda	
2015	Italy	Bernard Dematteis, Martin Dematteis, Xavier Chevrier, Alex Baldaccini, Luca Cagnati, Alessandro Rambaldini
2016	United States	
2017	Uganda	
2018	Uganda	Robert Chemonges, Joel Ayeko, Victor Kiplangat
2019	Czech Republic	Marek Chrascina, Jan Janů, Jáchym Kovář

==== Women ====
Edition	Country	Athletes
1985	Italy	Chiara Saporetti, Guidina Dal Sasso, Valentina Bottarelli, Sonia Basso
1986	Switzerland	Gaby Schütz, Helene Eschler, Karin Möbes, Daniela Salvi
1987	Italy	Giuliana Savaris, Maria Cocchetti, Lucia Soranzo. Cristina Porta
1988	Switzerland	Gaby Schütz, Christine Tischhauser, Irmgard Steiner, Helen Eschler
1989	Italy	Manuela Di Centa, Maria Cocchetti, Giuliana Savaris, Maria Grazia Roberti
1990	Switzerland	
1991	Switzerland	
1992	Austria	
1993	Italy	Nives Curti, Maria Grazia Roberti, Valeria Colpo, Antonella Molinari
1994	France	
1995	France	
1996	France	
1997	France	
1998	Italy	Matilde Ravizza, Maria Grazia Roberti, Rosita Rota Gelpi, Pierangela Baronchelli
1999	Italy	Rosita Rota Gelpi, Flavia Gaviglio, Pierangela Baronchelli, Maria Grazia Roberti
2000	New Zealand	Melissa Moon, Megan Edhouse, Karen Murphy & Carlene McDonald
2001	Italy	Rosita Rota Gelpi, Pierangela Baronchelli, Flavia Gaviglio, Daniela Spilotti
2002	Italy	Antonella Confortola, Pierangela Baronchelli, Rosita Rota Gelpi, Vittoria Salvini
2003	Scotland	
2004	Italy	Rosita Rota Gelpi, Antonella Confortola, Flavia Gaviglio, Matilde Ravizza
2005	Italy	Vittoria Salvini, Maria Grazia Roberti, Pierangela Baronchelli, Elisa Desco
2006	United States	
2007	United States	
2008	Norway	
2009	Great Britain	
2010	Italy	Valentina Belotti, Antonella Confortola, Maria Grazia Roberti, Alice Gaggi
2011	Italy	Ornella Ferrara, Antonella Confortola, Alice Gaggi, Valentina Belotti
2012	United States	
2013	Italy	Alice Gaggi, Elisa Desco, Antonella Confortola, Samantha Galassi
2014	Italy	Alice Gaggi, Elisa Desco, Antonella Confortola, Renate Rungger
2015	Great Britain	
2016	Italy	Valentina Belotti, Alice Gaggi, Sara Bottarelli, Antonella Confortola
2017	United States	
2018	Kenya	Lucy Murigi, Viola Jelagat, Joyce Njeru, Purity Gitonga
2019	France	Élise Poncet, Christel Dewalle, Anaïs Sabrié, Mathilde Sagnes

== See also ==
- World Long Distance Mountain Running Championships
- Commonwealth Mountain and Ultradistance Running Championships
- NACAC Mountain Running Championships
- European Mountain Running Championships
- South American Mountain Running Championships
