= 1994 World Mountain Running Trophy =

1994 World Mountain Running Championships
- Organisers: WMRA
- Edition: 10th
- Date: 4 September
- Host city: Berchtesgaden, Germany
- Events: 3

The 1994 World Mountain Running Championships was the 10th edition of the global mountain running competition, World Mountain Running Championships. This annual event is organised by the World Mountain Running Association and was held in Berchtesgaden, Germany on 4 September 1994.

== Results ==
=== Men ===
Distance 13.07 km, difference in height 1200 m, participants 115.

Rank	Athlete	Country	Time
1st place, gold medalist(s)	Helmut Schmuck	Austria	1:01:02
2nd place, silver medalist(s)	Antonio Molinari	Italy	1:01:36
3rd place, bronze medalist(s)	Ladislav Raim	Czech Republic	1:01:40
4	Jaime Mendes	France	1:02:15
5	Galdino Pilot	Italy	1:02:20
6	Robert Petro	Slovakia	1:02:22
7	Michael Scheytt	Germany	1:02:31
8	Robert Quinn	Scotland	1:02:33
9	Robin Bryson	Ireland	1:02:46
10	Peter Schatz	Austria	1:02:52

=== Men team ===
Rank	Country	Athletes	Points
1st place, gold medalist(s)	Italy	Antonio Molinari, Galdino Pilot, Costantino Bertolla, Claudio Amati, Andrea Agostini, Roberto Barbi	37
2nd place, silver medalist(s)	France	Jaime Mendes, Aziz Nih, Jean Paul Payet, Sylvain Richard, Eric Lacroix, Jean-Marie Gehin	53
3rd place, bronze medalist(s)	Germany	Michael Scheytt, Joerg Leipner, Dieter Ranftl, Martin Sambale, Kurt Koenig, Philipp Kehl	59

=== Men junior ===
Distance 7.34 km, difference in height 685 m, participants 57.

Rank	Athlete	Country	Time
1st place, gold medalist(s)	Martin Bajcicak	Slovakia	35:59
2nd place, silver medalist(s)	Lubomir Pokorny	Czech Republic	36:34
3rd place, bronze medalist(s)	Roman Skalsky	Czech Republic	36:58
4	Patrick Hartmann	Switzerland	36:58
5	John Brooks	Scotland	37:36
6	Benoit Delalex	France	37:44
7	Maurizio Bonetti	Italy	37:51
8	Erik Mikus	Slovakia	38:00
9	Charles Sykes	England	38:12
10	Rudy Golino	Italy	38:18

=== Men junior team ===
Rank	Country	Athletes	Points
1st place, gold medalist(s)	Czech Republic	Lubomir Pokorny, Roman Skalsky, Lubomir Dryjak, Petr Vymazal	18
2nd place, silver medalist(s)	Italy	Maurizio Bonetti, Rudy Golino, Alessio Rinaldi, Fabrizio Triulzi	31
3rd place, bronze medalist(s)	Switzerland	Patric Hartmann, Daniel Rohr, Beat Blaettler, Stefan Meister	36

=== Women ===
Distance 7.34 km, difference in height 685 m, participants 66.

Rank	Athlete	Country	Time
1st place, gold medalist(s)	Gudrun Pflüger	Austria	39:31
2nd place, silver medalist(s)	Isabelle Guillot	France	40:12
3rd place, bronze medalist(s)	Dita Hebelkova	Czech Republic	41:18
4	Nives Curti	Italy	41:28
5	Evelyne Mura H.	France	41:32
6	Els Peiren	Belgium	41:56
7	Carolina Reiber	Switzerland	42:16
8	Odile Leveque	France	42:20
9	Isabella Moretti	Switzerland	42:30
10	Elisabeth Rust	Austria	42:33

=== Women team ===
Rank	Country	Athletes	Points
1st place, gold medalist(s)	France	Isabelle Guillot, H. Evelyne Mura, Odile Leveque, Stephanie Manel	15
2nd place, silver medalist(s)	Austria	Gudrun Pfluger, Elisabeth Rust, Elisabeth Singer	31
3rd place, bronze medalist(s)	Italy	Nives Curti, Maria Grazia Roberti, Antonella Molinari, Mirella Cabodi	35
