= 2002 World Mountain Running Trophy =

- Organisers: WMRA
- Edition: 18th
- Dates: 15 September
- Host city: Innsbruck, Italy
- Level: Senior and Junior
- Events: 8

The 2002 World Mountain Running Championships was the 18th edition of the global mountain running competition, World Mountain Running Championships, organised by the World Mountain Running Association.

== Results ==
=== Men Senior ===
Participants 149.

Individual

Rank	Runner	Country	Time
1st place, gold medalist(s)	Jonathan Wyatt	New Zealand	56:31
2nd place, silver medalist(s)	Raymond Fontaine	France	1:00:05
3rd place, bronze medalist(s)	Ranulfo Sanchez	Mexico	1:00:12
4	Martin Cox	England	1:00:14
5	Marco Gaiardo	Italy	1:00:18
6	Miroslav Vanko	Slovakia	1:00:34
7	Marcel Matanin	Slovakia	1:00:35
8	Antonio Molinari	Italy	1:00:55
9	Marco De Gasperi	Italy	1:01:03
10	Sylvain Richard	France	1:01:07

Team

Rank	Team	Athletes	Points
1st place, gold medalist(s)	Italy	Marco Gaiardo, Antonio Molinari, Marco De Gasperi, Emanuele Manzi, Davide Milesi, Alessio Rinaldi	37
2nd place, silver medalist(s)	Slovakia	Miroslav Vanko, Marcel Matanin, Róbert Štefko, Ivan Bátory, Martin Bajčičák	55
3rd place, bronze medalist(s)	France	Raymond Fontaine, Sylvain Richard, Jean-Christophe Dupont, Edouard Burrier, Guillaume Fontaine, Gilles Segris	61

=== Women Senior ===
Participants 88.

Individual

Rank	Runner	Country	Time
1st place, gold medalist(s)	Svetlana Demidenko	Russia	53:16
2nd place, silver medalist(s)	Antonella Confortola	Italy	54:15
3rd place, bronze medalist(s)	Izabela Zatorska	Poland	54:44
4	Mona Burt	New Zealand	55:12
5	Isabelle Guillot	France	55:43
6	Shireen Crumpton	New Zealand	56:09
7	Pierangela Baronchelli	Italy	56:22
8	Angela Mudge	Scotland	56:35
9	Liliam Guerra	Ecuador	56:42
10	Daniela Gassmann	Switzerland	56:49

Team

Rank	Team	Athletes	Points
1st place, gold medalist(s)	Italy	Antonella Confortola, Pierangela Baronchelli, Rosita Rota Gelpi, Vittoria Salvini	22
2nd place, silver medalist(s)	New Zealand	Mona Burt, Shireen Crumpton, Melissa Moon, Carline Mc Donald	32
3rd place, bronze medalist(s)	France	Isabelle Guillot, Corinne Raux, Nathalie Chabran, Anne Docouto	37

=== Junior Men ===
Participants 64.

Individual

Rank	Runner	Country	Time
1st place, gold medalist(s)	Stefano Scaini	Italy	50:45
2nd place, silver medalist(s)	Jan Kreisinger	Czech Republic	51:18
3rd place, bronze medalist(s)	Grzegorz Dorszynski	Poland	51:32
4	Antonio Toninelli	Italy	51:44
5	Libor Erben	Czech Republic	52:07
6	Michael Galler	Germany	52:31
7	Mitja Kosovelj	Slovenia	52:52
8	Luca Orlandi	Italy	53:02
9	Joe Symonds	England	53:03
10	Peter Kastelic	Slovenia	53:03

Team

Rank	Team	Athletes	Points
1st place, gold medalist(s)	Italy	Stefano Scaini, Antonio Toninelli, Luca Orlandi, Marco Rinaldi	13
2nd place, silver medalist(s)	Slovenia	Mitja Kosovelj, Peter Kastelic, Peter Lamovec, Marko Tratnik	28
3rd place, bronze medalist(s)	Germany	Michael Galler, Matthias Jahn, Heiko Baier, Thomas Dold	36

=== Junior Women ===
Participants 46.

Individual

Rank	Runner	Country	Time
1st place, gold medalist(s)	Victoria Ivanova	Russia	21:00
2nd place, silver medalist(s)	Lea Vetsch	Switzerland	21:10
3rd place, bronze medalist(s)	Lisa Reisinger	Germany	21:18
4	Maria Sandbichler	Austria	21:29
5	Turkan Erismis	Turkey	21:45
6	Yeter Karakoc	Turkey	22:00
7	Mateja Kosovelj	Slovenia	22:13
8	Michela Beltrando	Italy	22:14
9	Juliane Doll	Germany	22:16
10	Agnieszka Stafa	Poland	22:19

Team

Rank	Team	Athletes	Points
1st place, gold medalist(s)	Turkey	Turkan Erismis, Yeter Karakoc, Saire Dogru	11
2nd place, silver medalist(s)	Germany	Lisa Reisinger, Juliane Doll, Christin Spindler	12
3rd place, bronze medalist(s)	Austria	Maria Sandbichler, Frederike Heinzle, Carina Wasle	17

== Medal table (junior events included) ==
Rank	Country	1st place, gold medalist(s)	2nd place, silver medalist(s)	3rd place, bronze medalist(s)	Tot.
1	Italy	3	1	0	4
2	New Zealand	2	1	1	4
3	Eritrea	1	1	0	2
3	France	1	1	0	2
5	Scotland	1	0	0	1
6	Austria	0	3	0	3
7	Germany	0	1	2	3
8	Poland	0	0	2	2
8	Switzerland	0	0	2	2
10	Czech Republic	0	0	1	1
