= 1993 World Mountain Running Trophy =

1993 World Mountain Running Championships
- Organisers: WMRA
- Edition: 9th
- Date: 5 September
- Host city: Gap, Hautes-Alpes, France
- Events: 3

The 1993 World Mountain Running Championships was the 9th edition of the global mountain running competition, World Mountain Running Championships, organised by the World Mountain Running Association and was held in Gap, Hautes-Alpes, France on 5 September 1993.

== Results ==
=== Men ===
Distance 10.942 km, difference in height 790 m, participants 99.

Rank	Athlete	Country	Time
1st place, gold medalist(s)	Martin Jones	England	51:43
2nd place, silver medalist(s)	Dave Dunham	United States	51:48
3rd place, bronze medalist(s)	Michel Humbert	France	51:54
4	Robin Bryson	Ireland	51:57
5	Michael Mc Dermott	South Africa	52:09
6	Costantino Bertolla	Italy	52:12
7	Renatus Birrer	Switzerland	52:19
8	Ueli Horisberger	Switzerland	52:31
9	Sylvain Richard	France	52:43
10	Dieter Ranftl	Germany	52:50

=== Men team ===
Rank	Country	Athletes	Points
1st place, gold medalist(s)	Italy	Costantino Bertolla, Adriano Pezzoli, Antonio Molinari, Fabio Ciaponi, Batista Lizzoli, Lucio Fregona	43
2nd place, silver medalist(s)	France	Michel Humbert, Sylvain Richard, Eddy Vandevyvere, Eric Lacroix, Jean Paul Payet, Henri Rivaud	54
3rd place, bronze medalist(s)	England	Martin Jones, Craig Roberts, Ian Holmes, Mark Crosdale, Mark Roberts, Robin Bergstrand	59

=== Men junior ===
Distance 7.94 km, difference in height 395 m, participants 54.

Rank	Athlete	Country	Time
1st place, gold medalist(s)	Gabriele De Nard	Italy	32:26
2nd place, silver medalist(s)	Maurizio Gemetto	Italy	33:03
3rd place, bronze medalist(s)	Roman Skalsky	Czech Republic	33:14
4	Martin Florek	Slovakia	33:29
5	Colin Jones	Wales	34:17
6	John Brooks	Scotland	34:37
7	William Styan	England	34:47
8	Ondrej Beren	Czech Republic	34:57
9	William Depoi	Ireland	35:00
10	Patrick Heinlein	Germany	35:21

=== Men junior team ===
Rank	Country	Athletes	Points
1st place, gold medalist(s)	Italy	Gabrielle Denard, Maurizio Gemetto, William Depoi, Moreno Nucera	12
2nd place, silver medalist(s)	Czech Republic	Roman Skalsky, Ondrej Beren, Danijel Krejcar, Petr Vymazal	33
3rd place, bronze medalist(s)	Wales	Colin Jones, Tim Davies, Ian Pierce, Craig Stepherd	36

=== Women ===
Distance 7.94 km, difference in height 395 m, participants 55.

Rank	Athlete	Country	Time
1st place, gold medalist(s)	Isabelle Guillot	France	36:11
2nd place, silver medalist(s)	Gudrun Pflüger	Austria	36:45
3rd place, bronze medalist(s)	Carol Greenwood	England	37:27
4	Nives Curti	Italy	38:05
5	Maria Grazia Roberti	Italy	38:20
6	Sarah Rowell	England	38:32
7	Silke Welt	Germany	38:39
8	Valeria Colpo	Italy	38:47
9	Antonella Molinari	Italy	38:48
10	Anna Baloghova	Slovakia	38:52

=== Women team ===
Rank	Country	Athletes	Points
1st place, gold medalist(s)	Italy	Nives Curti, Maria Grazia Roberti, Valeria Colpo, Antonella Molinari	17
2nd place, silver medalist(s)	England	Carol Greenwood, Sarah Rowell, Janet Kenyon, Kath Drake	26
3rd place, bronze medalist(s)	France	Isabelle Guillot, Karine Baratou, H. Evelyne Mura, Martine Barra-Jarverzac	27
