= 1987 World Mountain Running Trophy =

1987 World Mountain Running Championships
- Organisers: WMRA
- Edition: 3rd
- Date: 23 August
- Host city: Lenzerheide, Switzerland
- Events: 3

The 1987 World Mountain Running Championships was the 3rd edition of the global Mountain running competition, World Mountain Running Championships, organised by the World Mountain Running Association and was held in Lenzerheide, Switzerland on 23 August 1987.

== Results ==
=== Men individual ===
Distance 14.7 km, difference in height 1480 m, participants 47.

Rank	Athlete	Country	Time
1st place, gold medalist(s)	Jay Johnson	United States	1:11:43
2nd place, silver medalist(s)	Helmut Stuhlpfarrer	Austria	1:12:07
3rd place, bronze medalist(s)	Guido Dold	West Germany	1:12:56
4	Mohamed Youkmane	Algeria	1:13:19
5	Pio Tomaselli	Italy	1:14:23
6	Privato Pezzoli	Italy	1:15:28
7	Mike Short	England	1:15:43
8	Pierre Andre	France	1:15:49
9	Pablo Vigil	United States	1:16:16
10	Charly Doll	West Germany	1:16:24

=== Men team ===
Rank	Country	Athletes	Points
1st place, gold medalist(s)	Italy	Pio Tomaselli, Privato Pezzoli, Alfonso Vallicella, Claudio Galeazzi	24
2nd place, silver medalist(s)	West Germany	Guido Dold, Charly Doll, Georg Preuss, Gebhard Raedler	31
3rd place, bronze medalist(s)	Austria	Helmut Stuhlpfarer, Karl Zisser, Florian Stern, Hannes Mayer	36

=== Men short distance ===
Distance 8.9 km, difference in height 689 m, participants 44.

Rank	Athlete	Country	Time
1st place, gold medalist(s)	Fausto Bonzi	Italy	42:32
2nd place, silver medalist(s)	Luigi Bortoluzzi	Italy	42:46
3rd place, bronze medalist(s)	Renato Gotti	Italy	43:49
4	Wolfgang Münzel	West Germany	43:57
5	Georges Lischer	Switzerland	44:05
6	Ruedi Bucher	Switzerland	44:45
7	Franci Teraz	Yugoslavia	44:52
8	Malcom Paterson	England	45:00
9	Florent Michalon	France	45:18
10	Alberto Tassi	Italy	45:30

=== Men short distance team ===
Rank	Country	Athletes	Points
1st place, gold medalist(s)	Italy	Fausto Bonzi, Luigi Bortoluzzi, Renato Gotti, Alberto Tassi	6
2nd place, silver medalist(s)	Switzerland	Georges Liescher, Ruedi Bucher, Daniel Oppliger, Colombo Tramonti	24
3rd place, bronze medalist(s)	West Germany	Wolfgang Munzel, Kurt Koenig, Axel Huebenthal, Helmut Strobl	40

=== Men junior ===
Distance 7.6 km, difference in height 371 m, participants 29.

Individual

Rank	Athlete	Country	Time
1st place, gold medalist(s)	Fausto Lizzoli	Italy	32:23
2nd place, silver medalist(s)	Steven Hawkins	England	32:37
3rd place, bronze medalist(s)	Daniele Milanni	Italy	33:19
4	Rolf Keller	West Germany	33:21
5	Martin Schmid	Switzerland	33:22
6	Mario Poletti	Italy	33:27
7	Ivo Locatelli	Italy	33:45
8	Andy Peace	England	34:27
9	Oliver Findling	West Germany	34:31
10	Geoff Hall	England	34:37

=== Men junior team ===
Rank	Team	Athletes	Points
1st place, gold medalist(s)	Italy	Fausto Lizzoli, Danielle Milanni, Mario Poletti, Ivo Locatelli	10
2nd place, silver medalist(s)	England	Steven Hawkins, Andy Peace, Geoff Hall, Ian Dermott	20
3rd place, bronze medalist(s)	West Germany	Rolf Keller, Oliver Findling, Paul Wallner, Armin Ruinat	27

=== Women individual ===
Distance 7.6 km, difference in height 371 m, participants 27.

Rank	Athlete	Country	Time
1st place, gold medalist(s)	Fabiola Rueda	Colombia	35:47
2nd place, silver medalist(s)	Christine Fladt	West Germany	36:56
3rd place, bronze medalist(s)	Giuliana Savaris	Italy	37:08
4	Daniela Salvi	Switzerland	37:14
5	Karin Möbes	Switzerland	37:29
6	Maria Cocchetti	Italy	37:46
7	Lucia Soranzo	Italy	38:02
8	Eva Suler	Switzerland	38:21
9	Christine Haigh	England	38:32
10	Anni Oberhofer	Austria	38:43

=== Women team ===
Rank	Country	Athletes	Points
1st place, gold medalist(s)	Italy	Giuliana Savaris, Maria Cocchetti, Lucia Soranzo, Cristina Porta	16
2nd place, silver medalist(s)	Switzerland	Daniela Salvi, Karin Moebes, Eva Suler, Mariane Guhuenin	17
3rd place, bronze medalist(s)	West Germany	Christine Fladt, Susanne Bitzer, Gudrun Pomrehn	30
