= 2001 World Mountain Running Trophy =

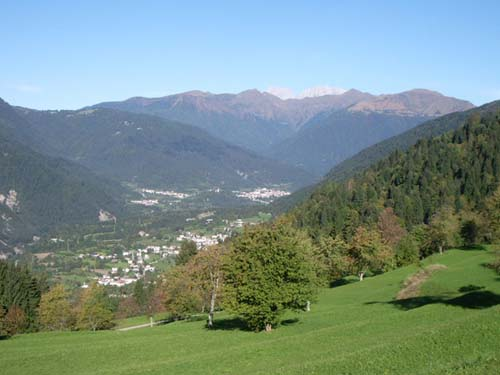
- Arta Terme landscape
- Organisers: WMRA
- Edition: 17th
- Dates: 16 September
- Host city: Arta Terme, italy
- Level: Senior and Junior
- Events: 8

The 2001 World Mountain Running Championships was the 17th edition of the global mountain running competition, World Mountain Running Championships, organised by the World Mountain Running Association.

== Results ==
=== Men Senior ===
Distance 12.96 km, difference in height 949 m, participants 143.

Individual

Rank	Runner	Country	Time
1st place, gold medalist(s)	Marco De Gasperi	Italy	1:01:05
2nd place, silver medalist(s)	Emanuele Manzi	Italy	1:01:08
3rd place, bronze medalist(s)	Billy Burns	England	1:01:21
4	Alexis Gex-Fabry	Switzerland	1:01:54
5	Lucio Fregona	Italy	1:02:04
6	Phil Costley	New Zealand	1:02:29
7	Thierry Breuil	France	1:02:54
8	Paulo Goncalves	Portugal	1:03:23
9	Gil Besseyre	France	1:03:40
10	Jean-Christophe Dupont	France	1:04:05

Team

Rank	Team	Athletes	Points
1st place, gold medalist(s)	Italy	Marco De Gasperi, Emanuele Manzi, Lucio Fregona, Alessio Rinaldi, Antonio Molinari, Andrea Agostini	19
2nd place, silver medalist(s)	France	Thierry Breuil, Gil Besseyre, Jean-Christophe Dupont, Sylvian Richard, Raymond Fontaine, Guillaume Fontaine	39
3rd place, bronze medalist(s)	England	Billy Burns, John Brown, John Taylor, Martin Cox, Rob Hope	104

=== Junior Men ===
Distance 8.55 km, difference in height 590 m, participants 71.

Individual

Rank	Runner	Country	Time
1st place, gold medalist(s)	Stefano Scaini	Italy	34:21
2nd place, silver medalist(s)	Florian Heinzle	Austria	34:52
3rd place, bronze medalist(s)	Davide Spini	Italy	35:58
4	Henryk Szost	Poland	36:08
5	Petr Hudek	Czech Republic	36:26
6	Marco Rinaldi	Italy	36:28
7	Tomasz Brzeski	Poland	36:54
8	Andrew Lemoncello	Scotland	36:55
9	Mitja Kosovelj	Slovenia	37:00
10	Eugeni Vassiliev	Russia	37:14

Team

Rank	Team	Athletes	Points
1st place, gold medalist(s)	Italy	Stefano Scaini, Davide Spini, Marco Rinaldi, Mirko Risina	10
2nd place, silver medalist(s)	Poland	Henryk Szost, Tomasz Brzeski, Andrzej Lachowski, Bartiomiej Kus	39
3rd place, bronze medalist(s)	Slovenia	Mitja Kosovelj, Peter Lamovec, Peter Kastelic, Matic Mlinar	45

=== Women Senior ===
Distance 8.55 km, difference in height 590 m, participants 86.

Individual

Rank	Runner	Country	Time
1st place, gold medalist(s)	Melissa Moon	New Zealand	38:02
2nd place, silver medalist(s)	Anna Pichrtova	Czech Republic	38:17
3rd place, bronze medalist(s)	Izabela Zatorska	Poland	38:50
4	Svetlana Demidenko	Russia	38:57
5	Angela Mudge	Scotland	39:28
6	Andrea Mayr	Austria	39:22
7	Ludmilla Melicherova	Slovakia	40:07
8	Cornelia Heinzla	Austria	40:07
9	Valerie Chowaniec	Canada	40:23
10	Rosita Rota Gelpi	Italy	40:48

Team

Rank	Team	Athletes	Points
1st place, gold medalist(s)	Italy	Rosita Rota Gelpi, Pierangela Baronchelli, Flavia Gaviglio, Daniela Spilotti	38
2nd place, silver medalist(s)	Poland	Izabela Zatorska, Irena Czuta-Pakosz, Alicja Jez, Barbara Twardochleb	41
3rd place, bronze medalist(s)	Austria	Andrea Mayr, Cornelia Heinzle, Elisabeth Singer, Karoline Kaefer	50

=== Junior Women ===
Distance 5.41 km, difference in height 325 m, participants 46.

Individual

Rank	Runner	Country	Time
1st place, gold medalist(s)	Lea Vetsch	Switzerland	27:25
2nd place, silver medalist(s)	Sarah Devoy	New Zealand	27:36
3rd place, bronze medalist(s)	Agnieszka Stafa	Poland	27:37
4	Elisa Desco	Italy	27:41
5	Małgorzata Górska	Poland	27:42
6	Frederike Heinzle	Austria	28:00
7	Valeria Marinoni	Italy	28:25
8	Karrissa Hawitt	England	29:04
9	Melissa Rodriguez	France	29:08
10	Michela Beltrando	Italy	29:12

Team

Rank	Team	Athletes	Points
1st place, gold medalist(s)	Poland	Agnieszka Stafa, Małgorzata Górska, Anna Wojtowicz	8
2nd place, silver medalist(s)	Italy	Elisa Desco, Valeria Marinoni, Michela Beltrando	11
3rd place, bronze medalist(s)	New Zealand	Sarah Devoy, Jane Nalder, Lucy Cant	18

=== Medal table (junior events included) ===
Rank	Country	1st place, gold medalist(s)	2nd place, silver medalist(s)	3rd place, bronze medalist(s)	Tot.
1	Italy	3	1	0	4
2	New Zealand	2	1	1	4
3	Eritrea	1	1	0	2
3	France	1	1	0	2
5	Scotland	1	0	0	1
6	Austria	0	3	0	3
7	Germany	0	1	2	3
8	Poland	0	0	2	2
8	Switzerland	0	0	2	2
10	Czech Republic	0	0	1	1
