= World Masters Mountain Running Championships =

The World Masters Mountain Running Championships is an international mountain running competition contested by athletes of the members of WMRA, World Mountain Running Association, the sport's global governing body.

The first edition was held in 2001 with female competitors in six age-groups from 35 and male competitors in seven age-groups from 40.

== Editions ==
Edition	Year	City	Country	Date
1st	2001	Ustron	Poland	22 September 2001
2nd	2002	Innsbruck	Austria	21 September 2002
3rd	2003	Zell am Harmersbach	Germany	19 September 2003
4th	2004	Sauze d'Oulx	Italy	28 August 2004
5th	2005	Keswick	United Kingdom	10 September 2005
6th	2006	Saillon	Switzerland	24 September 2006
7th	2007	Bludenz	Austria	23 September 2007
8th	2008	Dolni Morava	Czech Republic	6 September 2008
9th	2009	Zagreb	Croatia	12 September 2009
10th	2010	Korbielow	Poland	28 August 2010
11th	2011	Paluzza	Italy	17 September 2011
12th	2012	Buhlertal	Germany	19 May 2012
13th	2013	Janské_Lázně	Czech Republic	31 August 2013
14th	2014	Telfes	Austria	6 September 2014
15th	2015	Betws-y-Coed	United Kingdom	12 September 2015
16th	2016	Susa	Italy	27-28 August 2016
17th	2017	Dubnica nad Vahom	Slovakia	2 September 2017
18th	2018	Železniki	Slovenia	2 June 2018
19th	2019	Gagliano del Capo	Italy	28-29 September 2019
20th	2021	Telfes	Austria	3 September 2021
21st	2022	Clonmel	Ireland	3 September 2022
22nd	2023	Madeira	Portugal	16 September 2023
23rd	2024	Canfranc	Spain	12 September 2024
24th	2025	Meduno	Italy	27 August 2025
25th	2026	Janske Lazne	Czech Republic	26 June 2026
26th	2027	Klosters	Switzerland	10 June 2027

== Winners ==
=== Multiple Edition Winners ===
This table shows athletes that have won the most races, from 2001 until the 2016 edition.

Number of Wins	Men		Women	
Number of Wins	Athlete	Age-group: Years	Athlete	Age-group: Years
8			Maria Marcibalova (SVK)	70: 2006, 2007, 2008; 75: 2010, 2011, 2012, 2013, 2014
8			Marianne Spronk (GER)	55: 2003, 2004, 2006; 60: 2008, 2009, 2010, 2011; 65: 2013
7			Marie-Luise Heilig-Duventäster (GER)	40: 2003; 45: 2006, 2007, 2009; 50: 2011, 2012; 55: 2016
7			Blanka Paulu (CZE)	50: 2006, 2007; 55: 2009, 2010, 2011, 2012, 2013
5	Kaspar Scheiber (SUI)	60: 2001, 2002; 65: 2004, 2006; 70: 2009	Bärbel Berghaus (GER)	65: 2006, 2007, 2008, 2009; 70: 2011
4	Albert Anderegg (SUI)	60: 2006, 2007; 65: 2012, 2013	Ann-Marie Jones (GBR)	60: 2013, 2014, 2015, 2016
4	Bruno Baggia (ITA)	70: 2004, 2005; 75: 2010, 2011	Ivana Sekyrova (CZE)	35: 2010, 2011; 40: 2012, 2013
4	Craig Roberts (GBR)	45: 2009, 2011; 50: 2013, 2015		
4	Franco Torresani (ITA)	40: 2005; 45: 2007; 50: 2014, 2016		

=== Winners 2001 ===
Age-group	Men's individual	Women's individual
35		Ludmila Melicherova (SVK)
40	Colin Donnelly (SCO)	Sonia Armitage (SCO)
45	Sam Anning (ENG)	Danila Moras (ITA)
50	Frantisek Mach (CZE)	Louise Fairfax (AUS)
55	Goetz Biemann (CZE)	Erika Regitz (GER)
60	Kaspar Scheiber (SUI)	Irma Tomczak (POL)
65	Bill Gauld (SCO)	
70	Bolesław Mrozinski (POL)	

=== Winners 2002 ===
Age-group	Men's individual	Women's individual
35		C. Macdonald (NZL)
40	Robin Bryson (IRE)	Gudrun De Pay (GER)
45	Hugo Senoner (ITA)	Anni Frotschnig (AUT)
50	Giani Vello (ITA)	Louise Fairfax (AUS)
55	Helmut Reitmeir (GER)	Erika Dwereasa (AUT)
60	Kaspar Scheiber (SUI)	Barbara Wolf (GER)
65	Jiri Libra (CZE)	
70	Bolesław Mrozinski (POL)	

=== Winners 2003 ===
Age-group	Men's individual	Women's individual
35		Daniela Gassmann (SUI)
40	Helmut Schmuck (AUT)	Marie-Luise Heilig-Duventäster (GER)
45	Charly Doll (GER)	Odile Brakebusch-Leveque (FRA)
50	Albert Rungger (ITA)	Liane Muschler (GER)
55	Omer Van Noten (BEL)	Marianne Spronk (GER)
60	Peter Lessing (GER)	Emmi Schneider (GER)
65	Hans Weber (AUT)	Annemarie Stiegmann (GER)
70	Bill Gauld (SCO)	

=== Winners 2004 ===
Age-group	Men's individual	Women's individual
35		Anita Ortiz (USA)
40	Ricardo Mejía (MEX)	Isabelle Guillot (FRA)
45	Thomas Borschel (USA)	Chantal Baillon (FRA)
50	Meinrad Beha (GER)	Maureen Laney (ENG)
55	Bernard Grant (ENG)	Marianne Spronk (GER)
60	Helmut Reitmeir (GER)	Severina Pesando (ITA)
65	Kaspar Scheiber (SUI)	Lojzka Bratusa (SLO)
70	Bruno Baggia (ITA)	

=== Winners 2005 ===
Age-group	Men's individual	Women's individual
35		Angela Mudge (SCO)
40	Franco Torresani (ITA)	Sally Newman (ENG)
45	Dave Neill (ENG)	Cecilia Greasley (ENG)
50	Nigel Gates (ENG)	Maureen Laney (ENG)
55	Reinhart Vogler (GER)	Alison Brentnall (ENG)
60	Raymond Wilby (SCO)	Gerlinde Schmittner (GER)
65	Peter Covey (ENG)	Heather Goodman (ENG)
70	Bruno Baggia (ITA)	

=== Winners 2006 ===
Age-group	Men's individual	Women's individual
35	Sebastien Epiney (SUI)	Irena Pakosz (POL)
40	Simon Gutierrez (USA)	Michelle Leservoisier (FRA)
45	Andy Wilton (ENG)	Marie-Luise Heilig-Duventäster (GER)
50	Colin Earwaker (NZL)	Blanka Paulu (CZE)
55	Mike Short (ENG)	Marianne Spronk (GER)
60	Albert Anderegg (SUI)	Gerlinde Schmittner (GER)
65	Kaspar Scheber (SUI)	Bärbel Berghaus (GER)
70	Werner Schanné (GER)	Maria Marcibalova (SVK)
75	Eugen Schabel (AUT)	

=== Winners 2007 ===
Age-group	Men's individual	Women's individual
35	Robert Stark (AUT)	Tracey Brindley (SCO)
40	Simon Gutierrez (USA)	Claudia Helfenberger (SUI)
45	Franco Torresani (ITA)	Marie-Luise Heilig-Duventäster (GER)
50	Nigel Gates (ENG)	Blanka Paulu (CZE)
55	Trevor Jacobs (AUS)	Rosy Pattis (ITA)
60	Albert Anderegg (SUI)	Lilo Plener (GER)
65	Peter Lessing (GER)	Bärbel Berghaus (GER)
70	Jiri Libra (CZE)	Maria Marcibalova (SVK)

=== Winners 2008 ===
Age-group	Men's individual	Women's individual
35	Marjan Zupancic (SLO)	Anna Pichrtova (CZE)
40	Simon Gutierrez (USA)	Irena Pakosz (POL)
45	Gilles Convert (FRA)	Irmgard Kubicka (AUT)
50	Colin Earwaker (NZL)	Mags Greenan (IRL)
55	Alois Puchner (AUT)	Rosy Pattis (ITA)
60	Oldřich Šmida (CZE)	Marianne Spronk (GER)
65	Vincent Basista (SVK)	Bärbel Berghaus (GER)
70	Jiri Libra (CZE)	Maria Marcibalova (SVK)
75	Alexander Menarry (ENG)	
80	František Bem (CZE)	Xenia Nicolaev (MDA)

=== Winners 2009 ===
Age-group	Men's individual	Women's individual
35	Marcel Matanin (SVK)	Laura Ursella (ITA)
40	Davide Milesi (ITA)	Irena Pakosz (POL)
45	Craig Roberts (ENG)	Marie-Luise Heilig-Duventäster (GER)
50	Helmut Strobl (GER)	Mags Greenan (IRL)
55	Miloš Smrcka (CZE)	Blanka Paulu (CZE)
60	Oldřich Šmida (CZE)	Marianne Spronk (GER)
65	Bruno Innocente (ITA)	Bärbel Berghaus (GER)
70	Kaspar Scheiber (SUI)	Lojzka Bratusa (SLO)
75	Cerello Angelo (ITA)	
80	Rino Lavelli (ITA)	

=== Winners 2010 ===
Age-group	Men's individual	Women's individual
35	Marcel Matanin (SVK)	Ivana Sekyrova (CZE)
40	Tamás Gerlei (HUN)	Angela Mudge (SCO)
45	Paul Sichermann (GER)	Izabela Zatorska (POL)
50	Aleš Stransky (CZE)	Mags Greenan (IRL)
55	Miloš Smrcka (CZE)	Blanka Paulu (CZE)
60	Oldřich Šmida (CZE)	Marianne Spronk (GER)
65	Bruno Innocente (ITA)	Gerlinde Schmittner (GER)
70	Georg Gross (GER)	Lojzka Bratusa (SLO)
75	Bruno Baggia (ITA)	Mária Marcibalova (SVK)
80	Jiří Soukup (CZE)	Xenia Nicolaev (MDA)

=== Winners 2011 ===
Age-group	Men's individual	Women's individual
35	Massimo Galliano (ITA)	Ivana Sekyrova (CZE)
40	Antonio Molinari (ITA)	Maria Pia Chemello (ITA)
45	Craig Roberts (GBR)	Tracey Jayne Greenway (GBR)
50	Claudio Amati (ITA)	Marie-Luise Heilig-Duventäster (GER)
55	Leonid Tikhonov (RUS)	Blanka Paulu (CZE)
60	Aurelio Moscato (ITA)	Marianne Spronk (GER)
65	Alfred Fruet (ITA)	Lilo Plener (GER)
70	Georg Gross (GER)	Bärbel Berghaus (GER)
75	Bruno Baggia (ITA)	Mária Marcibalova (SVK)

=== Winners 2012 ===
Age-group	Men's individual	Women's individual
35	Matthias Hecktor (GER)	Jutta Brod (GER)
40	Carsten Brod (GER)	Ivana Sekyrova (CZE)
45	Stefan Hinze (GER)	Josefa Matheis (GER)
50	Claudio Amati (ITA)	Marie-Luise Heilig-Duventäster (GER)
55	Leonid Tikhonov (RUS)	Blanka Paulu (CZE)
60	Aurelio Moscato (ITA)	Annamaria Galbani (ITA)
65	Albert Anderegg (SUI)	Lilo Plener (GER)
70	Peter Lessing (GER)	Ingrid Hoffmann (GER)
75	Ambros Unterkircher (AUT)	Mária Marcibalova (SVK)

=== Winners 2013 ===
Age-group	Men's individual	Women's individual
35	Tommy Manning (USA)	Birgit Unterberger (GER)
40	Giuseppe Antonini (ITA)	Ivana Sekyrova (CZE)
45	Paul Sichermann (GER)	Tanja Nehme (GER)
50	Craig Roberts (GBR)	Irmi Kubicka (AUT)
55	Wilhelm Dengler (GER)	Blanka Paulu (CZE)
60	Tadeusz Jasek (POL)	Ann-Marie Jones (GBR)
65	Albert Anderegg (SUI)	Marianne Spronk (GER)
70	Martin Ford (GBR)	Ruth Schlager (GER)
75	Johann Weber (AUT)	Mária Marcibalova (SVK)

=== Winners 2014 ===
Age-group	Men's individual	Women's individual
35	Eric Blake (USA)	Petra Summer (AUT)
40	Daniele De Colo' (ITA)	Jutta Brod (GER)
45	Robert Stark (AUT)	Simonetta Menestrina (ITA)
50	Franco Torresani (ITA)	Irmi Kubicka (AUT)
55	Wilhelm Dengler (GER)	Karoline Dohr (AUT)
60	Miloš Smrcka (CZE)	Ann-Marie Jones (SWE)
65	Ivo Andrich (ITA)	Susan Archer (AUS)
70	Helmut Reitmeir (GER)	Helga Pongratz (AUT)
75	Georg Gross (GER)	Mária Marcibalova (SVK)

=== Winners 2015 ===
Age-group	Men's individual	Women's individual
35	Zac Freudenburg (USA)	Anna Lupton (GBR)
40	Morgan Donnelly (GBR)	Helen Berry (GBR)
45	Karl Gray (GBR)	Lucy Elliott (GBR)
50	Craig Roberts (GBR)	Sally Gibbs (NZL)
55	Franz Prager (GER)	Ali Keates (GBR)
60	Marino Portigliotti (ITA)	Ann-Marie Jones (GBR)
65	Bernard Grant (GBR)	Lou Lyness (GBR)
70	Geoffrey Howard (GBR)	Brenda Jones (GBR)
75	Norman Bush (GBR)	

=== Winners 2016 ===
Age-group	Men's individual	Women's individual
35	Ian Conroy (IRL)	Flavia Boglione (ITA)
40	Cesar Costa (POR)	Lou Roberts (GBR)
45	Daniele De Colo (ITA)	Simonetta Menestrina (ITA)
50	Franco Torresani (ITA)	Maria Castro Solino (ESP)
55	Claudio Amati (ITA)	Marie-Luise Heilig-Duventäster (GER)
60	Gianpaolo Englaro (ITA)	Ann-Marie Jones (GBR)
65	Pierino Barbonetti (ITA)	Anamaria Vaghi (ITA)
70	Vincenzo Imbrosci (ITA)	Barbara Prymakowska (POL)
75	Giuseppe Monini (ITA)	Eva Carlsen (NOR)

== See also ==
- World Long Distance Mountain Running Challenge
- Commonwealth Mountain and Ultradistance Running Championships
