= Rosita Rota Gelpi =

Italian mountain runner

Personal information
- Nationality: Italian
- Born: 6 November 1973 (age 52) Lecco

Sport
- Country: Italy
- Sport: Mountain running
- Club: G.S. Forestale
Medal record
Event	1st	2nd	3rd
World Championships Individual	2	0	0
World Championships Team	4	3	0
European Championships Individual	1	0	2
European Championships Team	3	0	0
Total	10	3	2

Rosita Rota Gelpi (born 6 November 1973) is a former Italian female mountain runner who won two World Mountain Running Championships (1999, 2004).

== Biography ==
She won also two national championships at individual senior level. She competed at four editions of the IAAF World Cross Country Championships at senior level (2001, 2002, 2003).

== Achievements ==
Year	Competition	Venue	Position	Event	Time	Notes
1996	World championships	(Austria) Telfes	7th	Individual race (7.25 km)	42.38	
1996	World championships	(Austria) Telfes	2nd	Team	10 points	
1997	World championships	(Czech Republic) Malé Svatonovice	6th	Individual race (7.8 km)	42.04	
1997	World championships	(Czech Republic) Malé Svatonovice	2nd	Team	10 points	
1999	World championships	(Malaysia) Kinabalu Park	1st	Individual race (7.8 km)	38:00	
1999	World championships	(Malaysia) Kinabalu Park	1st	Team	10 points	
2000	World championships	(Germany) Bergen	25th	Individual race (8.9 km)	55:05	
2000	World championships	(Germany) Bergen	2nd	Team	27 points	
2001	World championships	(Italy) Arta Terme	10th	Individual race (8.5 km)	40:48	
2001	World championships	(Italy) Arta Terme	1st	Team	38 points	
2002	World championships	(Austria) Innsbruck	13th	Individual race (9.2 km)	57:08	
2002	World championships	(Austria) Innsbruck	1st	Team	38 points	
2004	World championships	(Italy) Salice d'Ulzio	1st	Individual race (8.5 km)	38:00	
2004	World championships	(Italy) Salice d'Ulzio	1st	Team	14 points	

== Team results ==
- World Mountain Running Championships
  - (gold) 1999, 2001, 2002, 2004
  - (silver) 1996, 1997, 2000
- European Mountain Running Championships
  - (gold) 1998, 2000, 2004

== National titles ==
- Italian Mountain Running Championships
  - 1998, 1999
