= Carol Greenwood =

English runner

Carol Greenwood née Haigh
Personal information
- Nationality: British (English)
- Born: 15 March 1966 (age 60) Huddersfield, England

Sport
- Sport: Athletics
- Event: long distance
- Club: Holmfirth Harriers AC
Medal record
Representing Great Britain
Women's Athletics
World Mountain Running Championships
Gold medal – first place	1986 Morbegno	individual

Carol Marie Greenwood (née Haigh; born 15 March 1966) is an English former runner who won the World Mountain Running Trophy and was twice a national fell running champion.

== Biography ==
Haigh finished second behind Shireen Samy in the 5,000 metres event at the 1984 WAAA Championships.

Haigh ran internationally, representing her country at the 1984 World Cross Country Championships. She ran in the World Women's Road Race Championships in 1984, finishing seventh, and was on the winning team at the Yokohama International Women's Ekiden in the same year. In 1985, she set the current women's record for the Meltham "Murder Mile" uphill course with a time of 6:30. Haigh won the World Trophy in Morbegno in 1986.

Domestically, Haigh won the first English Fell Running Championships in 1986. Haigh married Allan Greenwood in 1990 and competed under her married name thereafter. The middle of her running career was affected by sciatica but she returned to prominence in the early 1990s, winning at Ben Nevis and the Three Peaks Race and having a run of thirty-eight consecutive victories in 1993, when she repeated her English Championships success. One of her wins that year was at the Snowdon Race, where she set a record time of 1:12:48.

Greenwood later finished third at the 1993 World Trophy, competed at the 1994 World Cross Country Championships and finished second behind Zahara Hyde in the 10,000 metres event at the 1994 AAA Championships.

She also finished second at the 1997 European Mountain Running Trophy.
