= Heather Goodman =

British canoeist (1935–2022)

Heather Blanche Goodman (30 March 1935 – 23 September 2022) was a fell runner and former canoeist from Great Britain. She competed at the 1972 Summer Olympics in Munich, West Germany, as a member of the British canoe slalom team, the first time the event was featured at the games. Goodman finished 13th in the women's K-1 slalom event.

Goodman was born Heather Meakin in Birkenhead, Cheshire on 30 March 1935. She competed nationally as a canoeist during the 1950s and 1960s. She married fellow canoeist Bill Goodman of Manchester Canoe Club. The couple settled together in Warwickshire. Goodman was British Canoe Champion ten times. She finished third at the 1970 World Championships in East Germany, and was selected for the British team for the 1972 Munich Olympics. She subsequently retired from competition. After moving to Kendal, she took up fell running in 1995, and only ten years later, aged 70, won the female over-65 gold medal at the fifth World Masters Mountain Running Championships in Keswick, Cumbria.

She died on 23 September 2022 in Kendal at the age of 87.
