= Athletics at the 1983 Pan American Games – Women's 3000 metres =

Women's 3000 metres at the Pan American Games

The women's 3000 metres event at the 1983 Pan American Games was held in Caracas, Venezuela on 28 August.

== Results ==
Rank	Name	Nationality	Time	Notes
1st place, gold medalist(s)	Joan Benoit	United States	9:14.19	
2nd place, silver medalist(s)	Brenda Webb	United States	9:28.89	
3rd place, bronze medalist(s)	Mónica Regonessi	Chile	9:41.87	
4	Fabiola Rueda	Colombia	9:47.59	
5	Ruth Jaime	Peru	9:58.85	
6	Marisela Rivero	Venezuela	10:05.73	
7	Norma Franco	El Salvador	10:12.08	
