= Coniston Fell Race =

Annual Lake District fell race in England

The Coniston Fell Race is an annual Lake District fell race held in April or May, starting and finishing in the village of Coniston. The route is approximately 14 kilometres (8.7 mi) in length with 1,065 metres (3,494 ft) of ascent and takes in checkpoints on the summits of Wetherlam, Swirl How and the Old Man of Coniston.

== History ==
The race was first run in 1982 and quickly became popular, attracting some of the best fell runners. In 1985, a bottleneck at the start of the route with 560 runners caused an entry limit of 400 to be introduced for future editions.

In 2016, inclement weather in the days leading up to the race resulted in a shorter route being used, avoiding some of the higher ground.

Coniston has been one of the counting races in the British or English Fell Running Championships on several occasions.

== Results ==
The men's record is held by Ian Holmes with a time of 1:03:29, set in 1996. Coniston was an English and British championship race that year and despite Mark Kinch running what he described as "the perfect race", he was overtaken by Holmes on the final descent.

The women's record of 1:17:11 was set in 2014 by Victoria Wilkinson.

Holmes has the most victories, with ten between 1993 and 2018.

The winners have been as follows.

| Year | Men | Time | Women | Time |
|---|---|---|---|---|
| 1982 | Billy Bland | 1:12:02 | | |
| 1983 | Bob Whitfield | 1:09:07 | Carol Walkington | 1:42:58 |
| 1984 | Kenny Stuart | 1:06:23 | Pauline Haworth | 1:25:18 |
| 1985 | Kenny Stuart | 1:05:46 | Pauline Haworth | 1:26:33 |
| 1986 | Rod Pilbeam | 1:09:11 | Diane Ellerton | 1:29:01 |
| 1987 | Billy Bland | 1:16:05 | Vanessa Brindle | 1:35:16 |
| 1988 | Malcolm Patterson | 1:10:41 | Sue Parkin | 1:26:27 |
| 1989 | Colin Valentine | 1:13:40 | Fiona Cole | 1:35:36 |
| 1990 | Sean Livesey | 1:10:59 | Sarah Rowell | 1:26:56 |
| 1991 | Malcolm Patterson | 1:07:24 | Amanda Isdale | 1:31:49 |
| 1992 | Keith Anderson | 1:05:22 | Clare Crofts | 1:24:49 |
| 1993 | Ian Holmes | 1:08:39 | Beverley Redfern | 1:25:33 |
| 1994 | Gavin Bland | 1:09:07 | Andrea Priestley | 1:28:18 |
| 1995 | Dave Truman | 1:13:04 | Vanessa Peacock | 1:29:17 |
| 1996 | Ian Holmes | 1:03:29 | Menna Angharad | 1:20:51 |
| 1997 | John Hooson and Mark Horrocks | 1:18:10 | Kate Beaty | 1:37:33 |
| 1998 | Rob Jebb | 1:11:56 | Lyn Thompson | 1:32:42 |
| 1999 | Simon Stainer | 1:14:03 | Kate Beaty | 1:36:50 |
| 2000 | Stephen Savage | 1:14:59 | Louise Sharp | 1:39:01^{[A]} |
| 2001 | Cancelled due to foot-and-mouth outbreak | | | |
| 2002 | Ian Holmes | 1:06:02 | Andrea Priestley | 1:21:01 |
| 2003 | Ted Mason | 1:17:04 | Vanessa Peacock | 1:33:35 |
| 2004 | Ian Holmes | 1:08:44 | Sally Newman | 1:28:01 |
| 2005 | Rob Jebb | 1:11:07 | Sharon Taylor | 1:28:19 |
| 2006 | Ian Holmes | 1:10:35 | Sharon Taylor | 1:26:29 |
| 2007 | Ian Holmes | 1:08:37 | Jackie Lee | 1:24:15 |
| 2008 | Ian Holmes | 1:11:43 | Natalie White | 1:25:04 |
| 2009 | Ian Holmes | 1:09:41 | Kirstin Bailey | 1:33:09 |
| 2010 | Ian Holmes | 1:08:39 | Emma Clayton | 1:21:47 |
| 2011 | Rob Hope | 1:10:55 | Lou Roberts | 1:30:27 |
| 2012 | Rob Hope | 1:09:31 | Lizzie Adams | 1:23:21 |
| 2013 | Darren Kay | 1:11:32 | Victoria Wilkinson | 1:21:07 |
| 2014 | Tom Addison | 1:07:57 | Victoria Wilkinson | 1:17:11 |
| 2015 | Tom Addison | 1:12:32 | Caitlin Rice | 1:29:44 |
| 2016^{[B]} | Carl Bell | 1:00:08 | Heidi Dent | 1:07:19 |
| 2017 | Tom Addison | 1:08:13 | Lou Roberts | 1:25:47 |
| 2018 | Ian Holmes | 1:15:22 | Sarah Pyke | 1:38:22 |
| 2019 | Rob Jebb | 1:13:11 | Sharon Taylor | 1:29:03 |
| 2020 | Cancelled due to the COVID-19 pandemic | | | |
| 2021 | Cancelled due to the COVID-19 pandemic | | | |
| 2022 | Jack Wright | 1:10:37 | Helen Smith | 1:30:11 |
| 2023 | Cancelled | | | |
| 2024 | Matthew Elkington | 1:13:11 | Alexandra Whitaker | 1:28:43 |
| 2025 | Jack Wright | 1:14:53 | Hannah Russell | 1:25:42 |
| 2026 | Tom Simpson | 1:11:20 | Sophie Allen | 1:32:48 |

^{A} The race report in The Fellrunner, Jun 2000, suggests that Louise Sharp was the winner in 1:39:01, but the 2001 championships preview in The Fellrunner Magazine, Feb 2001, indicates that the first woman in 2000 had been Nicola Davies in 1:31:28.

^{B} Short course.
