= Alfonso Vallicella =

Italian mountain runner

Personal information
- Nicknames: the Lessinia suede (il camoscio della Lessinia)
- Nationality: Italian
- Born: 6 September 1956 (age 69) Ronconi

Sport
- Country: Italy
- Sport: Mountain running
- Club: Atletica Prisma Logistics Asd
Medal record
Event	1st	2nd	3rd
World Championships Individual	3	0	0
World Championships Team	4	0	0
Total	7	0	0

Alfonso Vallicella (born 6 September 1956) is a former Italian male mountain runner, seven times world champion (three at individual level and four with the national team), at the World Mountain Running Championships.

== Achievements ==
Year	Competition	Venue	Position	Event	Time	Notes
1985	World championships	(Italy) San Vigilio di Marebbe	1st	Individual race (14.6 km)	1:06:54	
1985	World championships	(Italy) San Vigilio di Marebbe	1st	Team	8 points	
1986	World championships	(Italy) Morbegno	1st	Individual race (15 km)	1:00:36	
1986	World championships	(Italy) Morbegno	1st	Team	16 points	
1987	World championships	(Switzerland) Lenzerheide	13th	Individual race (14.7 km)	1:17:22	
1987	World championships	(Switzerland) Lenzerheide	1st	Team	24 points	
1988	World championships	(United Kingdom) Keswick	1st	Individual short race	44:25	
1988	World championships	(United Kingdom) Keswick	1st	Team short race	11 points	

== National titles ==
- Italian Mountain Running Championships
  - Mountain running: 1987
