= Renato Gotti =

Italian long-distance runner

Personal information
- Nationality: Italian
- Born: 26 July 1964 (age 61)

Sport
- Country: Italy
- Sport: Athletics; Mountain running
- Event: Long-distance running

Achievements and titles
- Personal best: 5000 m: 13:32.64 (1990)
Medal record
Mountain running
World Championships
Gold medal – first place	1987 Lenzerheide	Team SR
Bronze medal – third place	1987 Lenzerheide	Individual SR

Renato Gotti (born 26 July 1964) is a former Italian male long-distance runner who competed at three editions of the IAAF World Cross Country Championships at senior level (1992, 1993, 1994). He won two national championships at senior level (5000 metres: 1992, 1994).

== Achievements ==
Year	Competition	Venue	Position	Event	Time	Notes
1986	World championships	(Italy) Morbegno	3rd	Individual short race	46:40	
1986	World championships	(Italy) Morbegno	1st	Team short race	7 points	
1987	World championships	(Switzerland) Lenzerheide	3rd	Individual short race	43:49	
1987	World championships	(Switzerland) Lenzerheide	1st	Team short race	6 points	
