= Beverley Redfern =

British mountain runner

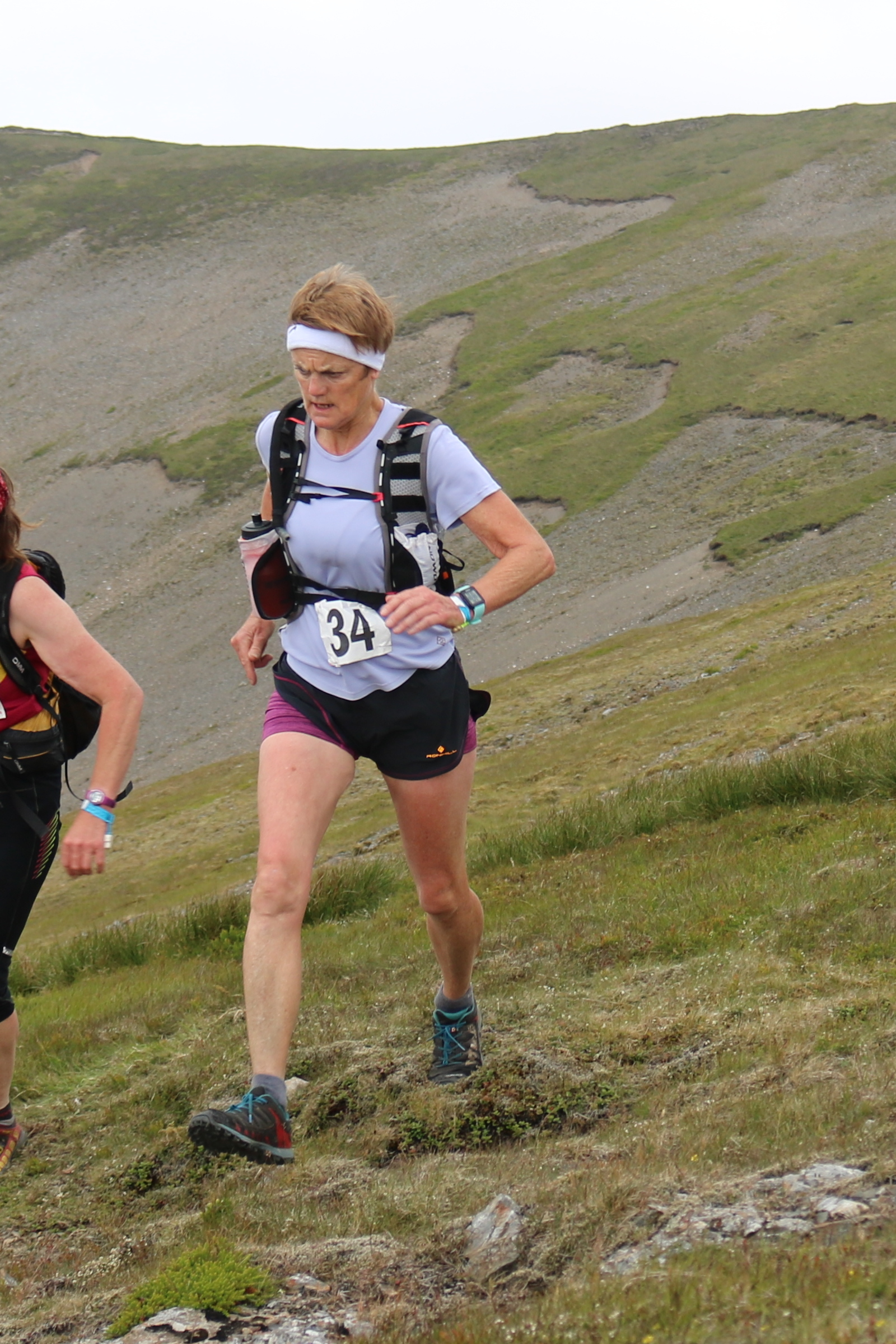
- Beverley Redfern at 2018 Buttermere Horseshoe

Personal information
- Nationality: British

Sport
- Country: Great Britain
- Sport: Mountain running
Medal record
Event	1st	2nd	3rd
World Championships Individual	1	0	0
Total	1	0	0

Beverley Redfern (born c.1956 in Mtarfa, Malta) is a British mountain runner who won the 1990 World Mountain Running Championships.

She also won the Ben Nevis Race in 1989, the Coniston Fell Race in 1993, and Sierre-Zinal, also in 1993.

Redfern still holds the women's course record for the Ben Lomond Hill Race which she set in 1990.
