= Jay Johnson (runner) =

Personal information
- Nationality: American
- Born: 8 November 1959 (age 66)

Sport
- Country: United States
- Sport: Mountain running
Medal record
Event	1st	2nd	3rd
World Championships	1	0	0
Total	1	0	0

Jay Johnson (born 8 November 1959) is a former American mountain runner who won 1987 World Mountain Running Championships.
