= Helmut Stuhlpfarrer =

Austrian mountain runner (1959–2025)

Personal information
- Nationality: Austrian
- Born: 19 March 1959
- Died: 10 October 2025 (aged 66)

Sport
- Country: Austria
- Sport: Mountain running
Medal record
Event	1st	2nd	3rd
World Championships	0	3	0
Total	0	3	0

Helmut Stuhlpfarrer (19 March 1959 – 10 October 2025) was an Austrian mountain runner who was three times silver medallist at individual senior level at the World Mountain Running Championships (1985, 1986, 1987). He died on 10 October 2025, at the age of 66.
