= Fausto Bonzi =

Italian mountain runner

Personal information
- Nationality: Italian
- Born: 27 September 1961 (age 64)

Sport
- Country: Italy
- Sport: Mountain running
Medal record
Event	1st	2nd	3rd
World Championships Individual	2	1	1
World Championships Team	5	0	0
Total	7	1	1

Fausto Bonzi (born 27 September 1961) is a former Italian male mountain runner, seven times world champion (two at individual level and five with the national team), at the World Mountain Running Championships.

== Biography ==
He won five national championships at individual senior level.

== Achievements ==
Year	Competition	Venue	Position	Event	Time	Notes
1985	World championships	(Italy) San Vigilio di Marebbe	3rd	Individual race	1:09:41	
1985	World championships	(Italy) San Vigilio di Marebbe	1st	Team	8 points	
1986	World championships	(Italy) Morbegno	2nd	Individual short race	45:37	
1986	World championships	(Italy) Morbegno	1st	Team short race	7 points	
1987	World championships	(Switzerland) Lenzerheide	1st	Individual short race	42:32	
1987	World championships	(Switzerland) Lenzerheide	1st	Team short race	6 points	
1988	World championships	(United Kingdom) Keswick	7th	Individual short race	45:36	
1988	World championships	(United Kingdom) Keswick	1st	Team short race	11 points	
1989	World championships	(France) Châtillon-en-Diois	1st	Individual short race	46:00	
1989	World championships	(France) Châtillon-en-Diois	1st	Team short race	10 points	

== National titles ==
- Italian Mountain Running Championships
  - Mountain running: 1983. 1984, 1985, 1986, 1989
