= Melissa Moon =

New Zealand long-distance runner

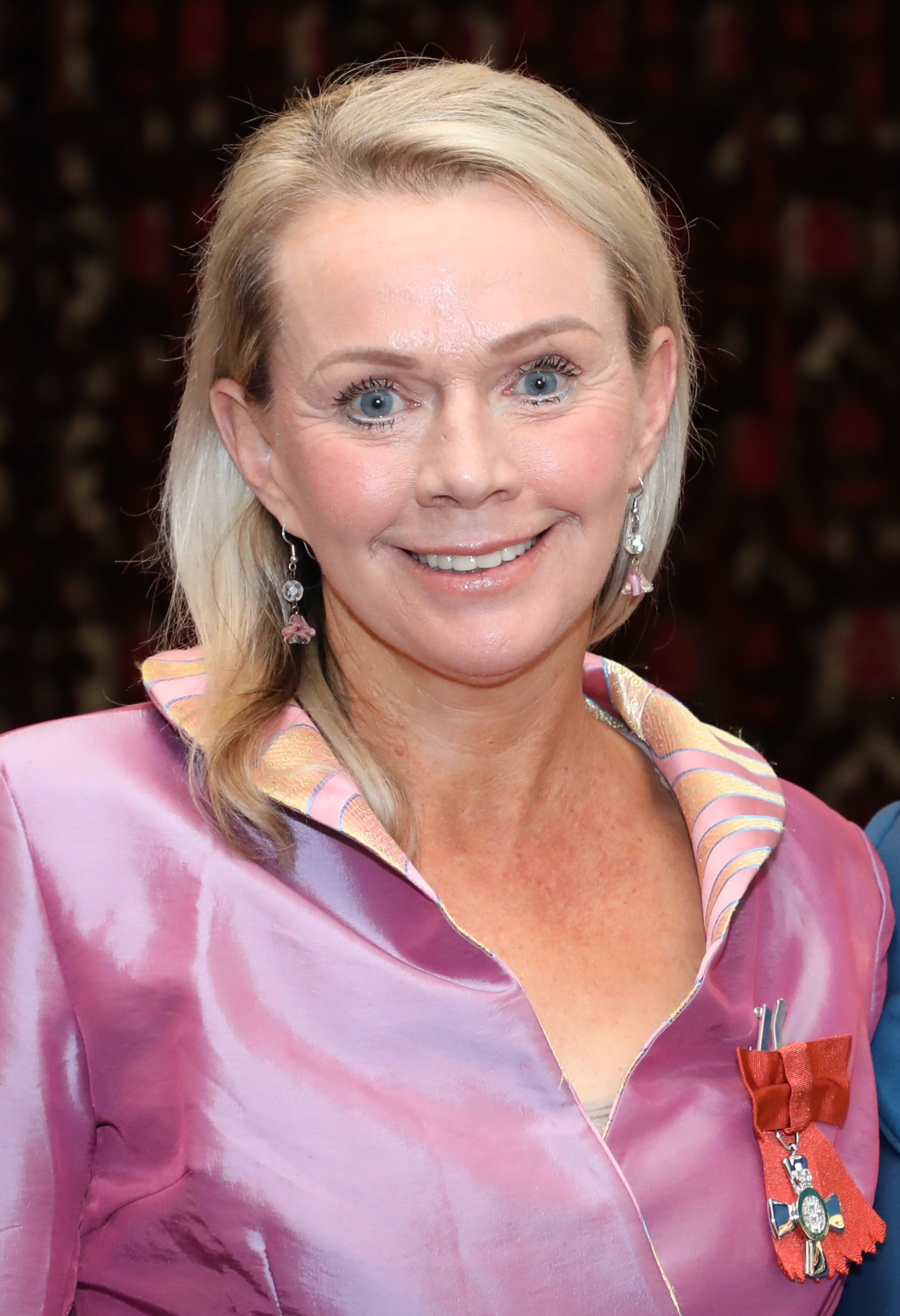
- Moon in 2021

Personal information
- Born: 16 September 1969 (age 57) Wellington, New Zealand

Sport
- Sport: Long-distance running

Melissa Potocka Moon MNZM (born 16 September 1969) is a long-distance runner from Wellington, New Zealand. She is a two time World Mountain Running champion and has won 21 New Zealand athletics titles over her career. In 2001, she was named New Zealand Sportswoman of the Year. In 2008, she was named as one of the JCI Ten Outstanding Young Persons of the World (TOYP).

In 2010, Moon won the women's race up the 86 flights of stairs of the Empire State Building, in a time of 13 minutes and 13 seconds. In the 2021 New Year Honours, Moon was appointed a Member of the New Zealand Order of Merit, for services to athletics and charitable causes.

Awards
Preceded by Leilani Joyce	New Zealand's Sportswoman of the Year; 2001	Succeeded by Barbara Kendall
