= Colin Donnelly =

British ultramarathon runner

Personal information
- Nationality: Scottish
- Born: 5 September 1959 (age 66)

Sport
- Country: Scotland
- Sport: Long-distance running
- Event(s): Fell running, mountain running
Medal record
Mountain running
Representing Scotland
World Mountain Running Trophy
Silver medal – second place	1989 Drôme	Short race
Bronze medal – third place	1989 Drôme	Men's team
World Masters MR Championships
Gold medal – first place	2001 Ustron	Over 40s
Gold medal – first place	2019 Leece	Over 60s
- Updated on 3 December 2014

Colin Kerr Donnelly (born 5 September 1959) is a Scottish runner who was the British fell running champion three times and finished second in the World Mountain Running Trophy.

== Early life ==
Donnelly is a son of Raymond Donnelly, a sometime racing cyclist. Colin attended Eastwood High School, Newton Mearns and was a member of the Cambuslang Harriers. He showed some talent as a youngster, winning the Galloway and Renfrewshire Schools under-19s cross country championships. His first hill race was at Ben Lomond in 1978. The following year, he won the Ben Nevis Race and in 1980 finished a close second in the Three Peaks Race. He graduated in Arts from the University of Aberdeen.

== Running career ==
The peak of Donnelly's running career was in the late 1980s. In 1986 he had another victory at Ben Nevis in one of the fastest times ever recorded for the race. He won the British Fell Running Championships three consecutive times from 1987 to 1989 and in 1988, he won the Snowdon Race.

Also in 1988, he set a record for the traverse of the Welsh 3000s with a time of 4:19 which stood until 2019 when it was beaten by Finlay Wild. Donnelly has also won the Welsh 1000 m Peaks Race many times.

Donnelly finished second in the short race at the World Mountain Running Trophy in 1989. As a veteran, he won global titles at the World Masters Mountain Running Championships in the over-40 category in 2001 and as an over-60 runner in 2019.

He held the course record for the Buckden Pike Race from 1988 to 2022, and still holds the Shelf Moor Race record, set in 1989. He continued to win races as late as 2017, thirty-eight years after his first Ben Nevis win.

He has completed the Bob Graham, Paddy Buckley and Ramsay Rounds, as well as the South Wales 2,000ers.
