= Fabiola Rueda =

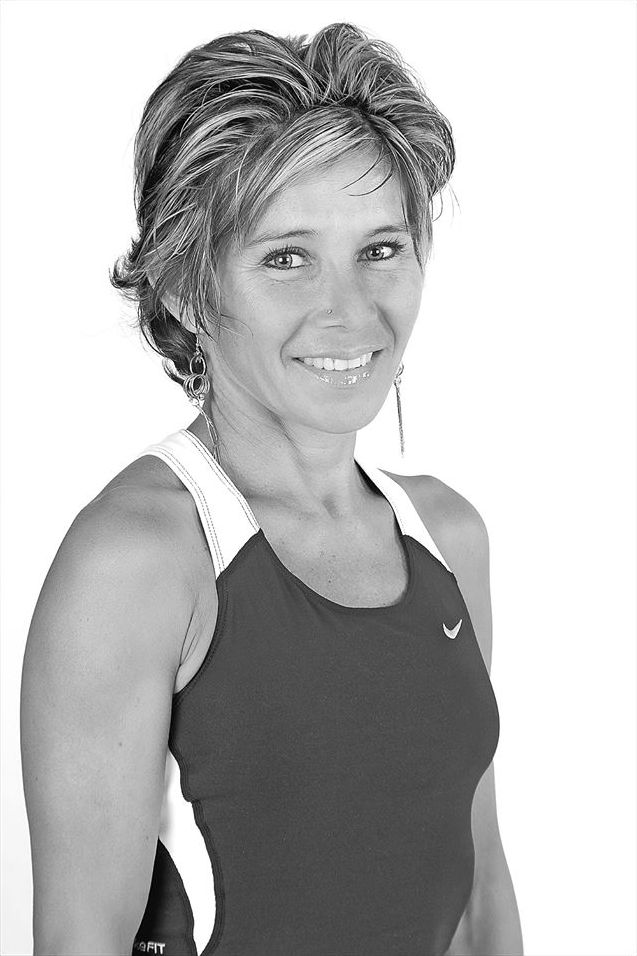

Personal information
- Nationality: Colombian
- Born: 26 March 1963 (age 63)

Sport
- Country: Colombia
- Sport: Mountain running, track and field
Medal record
Event	1st	2nd	3rd
World Mountain Running Championships	2	1	0
Total	2	1	0

Luz Fabiola Rueda (married name Oppliger, born 26 March 1963) is a former Colombian long-distance runner and mountain runner.

She who won two World Mountain Running Championships (1987, 1988).

On the global level she also finished 7th at the 1985 IAAF World Indoor Games (3000 m), competed at the 1987 IAAF World Women's Road Race Championships (15 km), the 1990 World Cross Country Championships (long race), finished 15th at the 1991 World Championships (marathon) and competed at the 1998 IAAF World Half Marathon Championships.

In regional competitions, she won a silver medal at the 1982 Central American and Caribbean Junior Championships (3000 m), a bronze medal at the 1983 Ibero-American Championships (3000 m), a silver medal at the 1983 Central American and Caribbean Championships, two bronze medals at the 1985 South American Championships (1500 and 3000 m), a gold medal at the 1986 Central American and Caribbean Games (3000 m) and two bronze medals at the 1987 Central American and Caribbean Championships (1500 and 3000 m). At the 1983 Pan American Games she finished fifth in the 1500 m and fourth in the 3000 m.

She won the 1987 Lille Marathon, the 1987 and 1991 Rome Marathon, the 1991 Madrid Marathon, the 1991 Reims Marathon, the 1996 Lausanne Marathon and the 2006 Basel Marathon. Her personal best time was 2:36:03 hours, achieved in September 1990 in Puteaux.
