= Gudrun Pflüger =

Austrian mountain runner (1972–2023)

Personal information
- Nationality: Austrian
- Born: 18 August 1972 Graz, Styria, Austria
- Died: 17 August 2023 (aged 50) Radstadt, Salzburg, Austria

Sport
- Country: Austria
- Sport: Mountain running
Medal record
Event	1st	2nd	3rd
World Championships	4	1	0
Total	4	1	0

Gudrun Pflüger (18 August 1972 – 17 August 2023) was an Austrian mountain runner four-time winner of the World Mountain Running Championships (1992, 1994, 1995, 1996).

== Biography ==
After retiring from the World Cup in Mountain running and xc skiing, she moved to Chelsea Quebec and later travelled in British Columbia, Canada, engaging in the study and conservation of wolves. During one field trip, Pflüger was spotted by the wolves she was studying and lay prone in the grass in order to try and lure them closer.

Pflüger died in Radstadt on 17 August 2023, one day shy of her 51st birthday.

== Books ==
- Pflüger, Gudrun (2015). Wolf Spirit: A Story of Healing, Wolves and Wonder. Canada: Rocky Mountain Books. ISBN 1771601272.
