= Izabela Zatorska =

Polish mountain runner (born 1962)

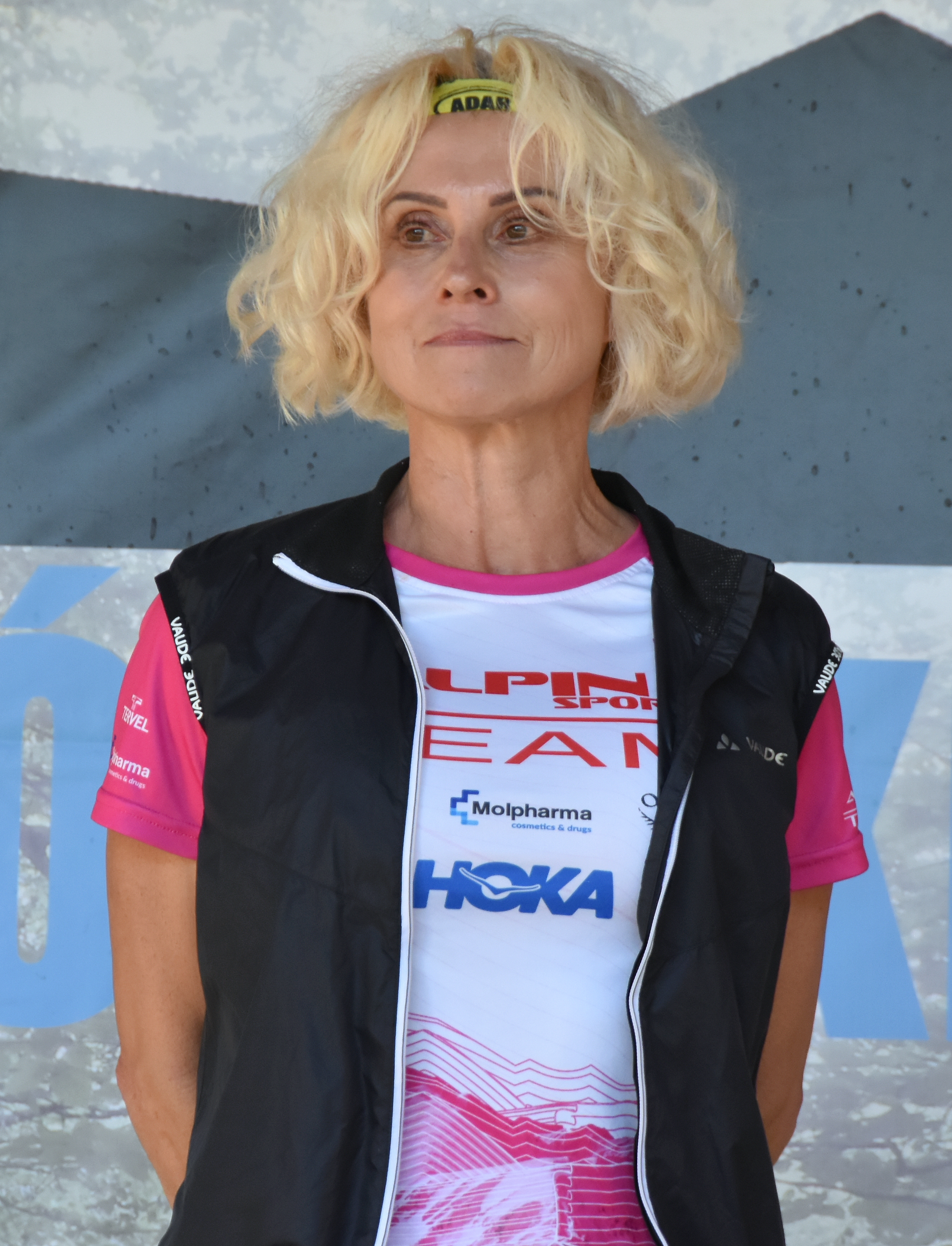
- Izabela Zatorska (2023)

Personal information
- Nationality: Polish
- Born: 6 October 1962 (age 63) Paczków, Polish People's Republic

Sport
- Country: Poland
- Sport: Athletics; Mountain running
- Event: Marathon

Achievements and titles
- Personal bests: Half marathon: 1:11:53 (2000); Marathon: 2:33:46 (1992)
Medal record
Mountain running
Event	1st	2nd	3rd
World Championships	0	1	3
European Championships	2	0	0
Total	2	1	3

Izabela Zatorska (born 6 October 1962) is a Polish female mountain runner three-time winner of the WMRA World Cup (2001, 2004, 2005).

== Biography ==
Before becoming a mountain runner, she was a long-distance runner, among her achievements she also won 1991 Roma-Ostia Half Marathon.
