= Luigi Bortoluzzi =

Italian mountain runner

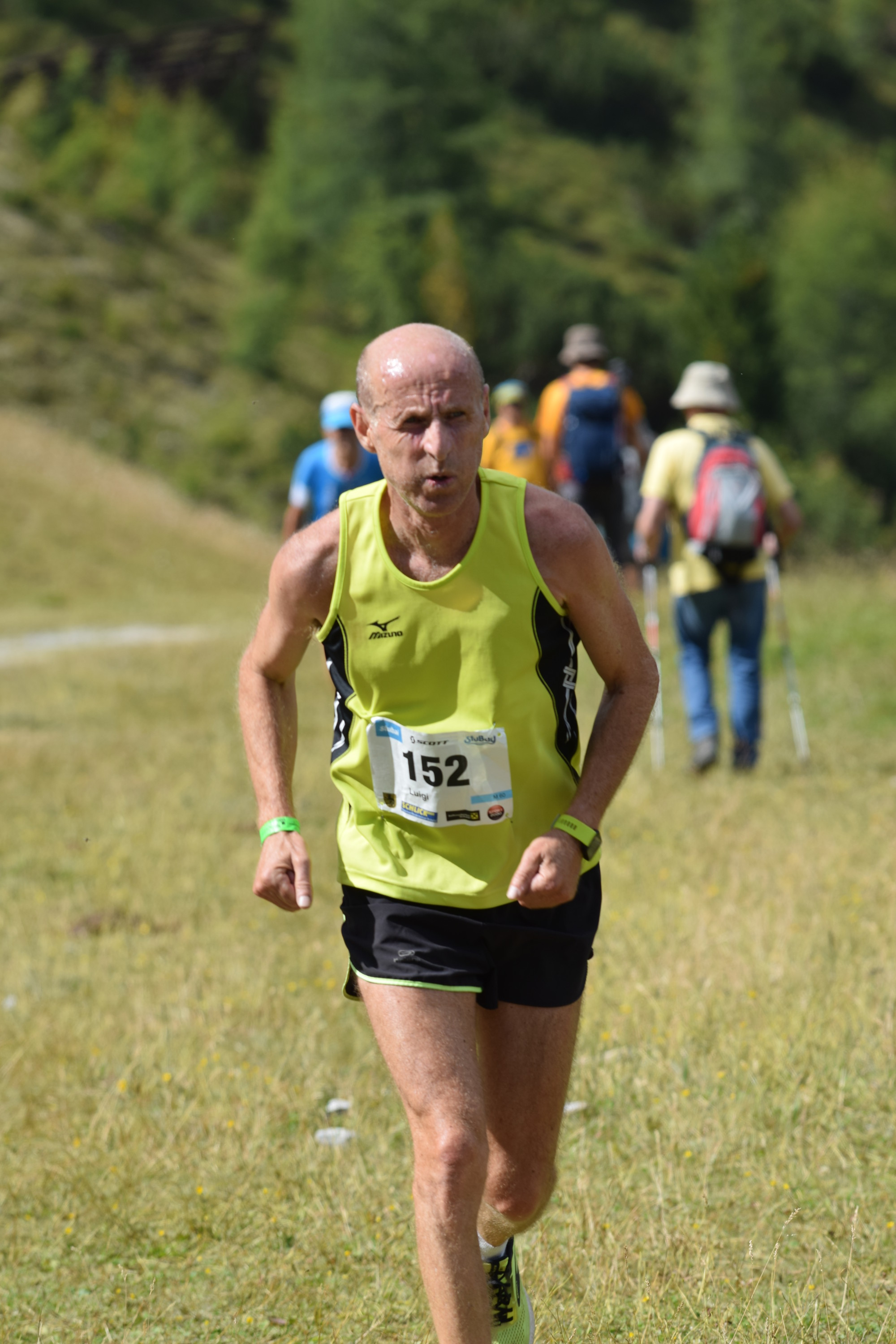
- Luigi Bortoluzzi at the 2021 World Masters Mountain Running Championships

Personal information
- National team: Italy (8 caps in 1984-1990)
- Born: 7 March 1961 (age 65) Tambre, Italy

Sport
- Country: Italy
- Sport: Mountain running

Achievements and titles
- Personal best: Half marathon: 1:06:47 (2004)
Medal record
Mountain running
Event	1st	2nd	3rd
World Championships (individual)	0	0	2
World Championships (team)	4	0	0
Total	4	0	2
World Championships
Bronze medal – third place	1988 Keswick	Individual
Bronze medal – third place	1989 Chatillon-en-Diois	Individual

Luigi Bortoluzzi (born 7 March 1961) is a former Italian male mountain runner, who won two medals at individual senior level at the World Mountain Running Championships.

== See also ==
- Italy at the World Mountain Running Championships
