= Telfes =

Telfes im Stubai
- Municipality
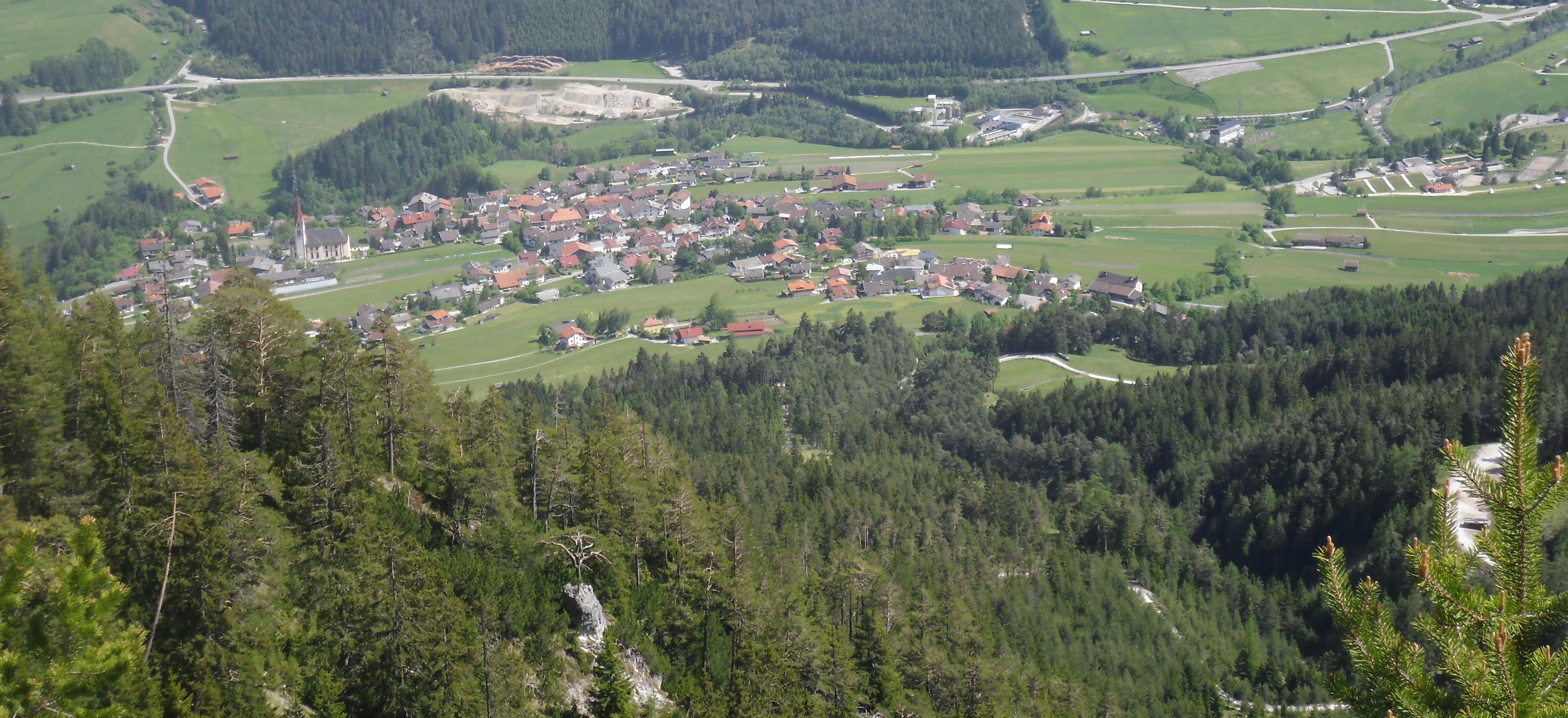

- Coat of arms

- Location within Austria
- Coordinates: 47°09′53″N 11°21′31″E
- Country: Austria
- State: Tyrol
- District: Innsbruck Land

Government
  - Mayor: Georg Viertler

Area
  - Total: 27.38 km^{2} (10.57 sq mi)
- Elevation: 987 m (3,238 ft)

Population (2018-01-01)
  - Total: 1,570
  - Density: 57.3/km^{2} (149/sq mi)
- Time zone: UTC+1 (CET)
  - Summer (DST): UTC+2 (CEST)
- Postal code: 6165
- Area code: 05225
- Vehicle registration: IL
- Website: www.gemeinde-telfes.at

Telfes (officially Telfes im Stubai) is a village in the district Innsbruck Land in the Austrian state of Tyrol. It is situated in the Stubaital 11 km south of Innsbruck.

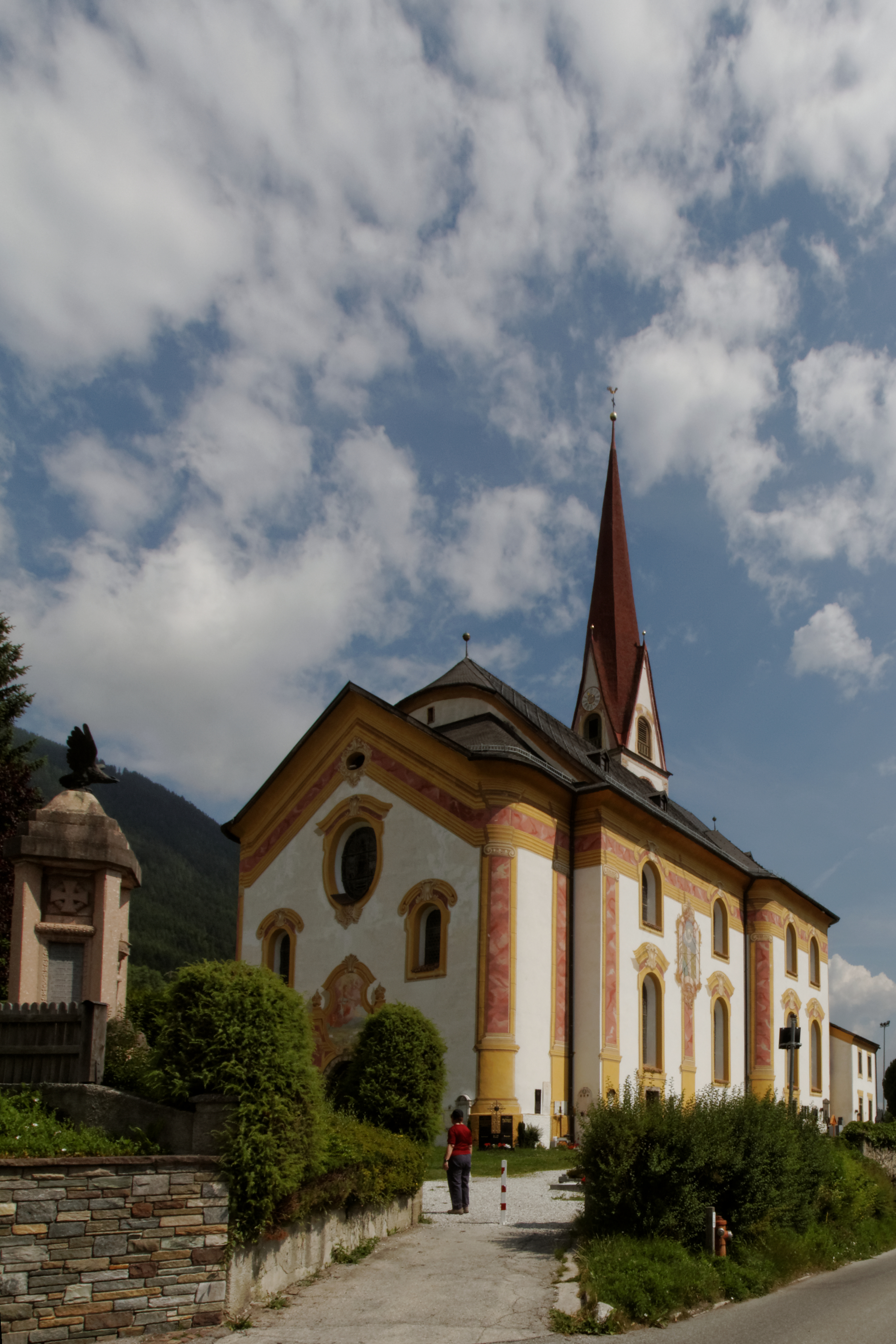
St. Pankratius Telfes

The municipality consists of the districts Telfes, Gagers, Kapfers, Plöven and Luimes. The area is about 27.83 km², and it is situated 987 m above sea level.

The coat of arms shows a lynx.

== Neighbor villages ==
Axams, Birgitz, Fulpmes, Götzens, Grinzens, Mieders, Mutters, Neustift im Stubaital, Schönberg im Stubaital.

== Population ==
Historical population
Year	Pop.	±%
1869	502	—
1880	468	−6.8%
1890	474	+1.3%
1900	444	−6.3%
1910	458	+3.2%
1923	506	+10.5%
1934	559	+10.5%
1939	552	−1.3%
1951	686	+24.3%
1961	649	−5.4%
1971	987	+52.1%
1981	1,069	+8.3%
1991	1,192	+11.5%
2001	1,369	+14.8%
2011	1,449	+5.8%

== Geography ==
The village of Telfes is located in the front Stubaital, on the sunny left side of the Ruetz river. The municipality lies at an altitude of about 1000 m and has an area of 27.38 square kilometers. The hamlets Gerstbichl, Falschmair, Luimes, the scattered houses Telfer Wiesen and the single vineyards Wiesenhof and Gallhof (already above Schönberg) out of the valley belong to the municipality, as well as the Pfarrachalm at the Nederjoch, and the well-known hiking and skiing area Schlick below the Kalkkögel with the alpine inns Schlick (Schlickeralm) and Zirmach at the bottom of the valley, as well as Froneben and Sennjoch at the ridge (at Kreuzjoch only the cable car station).

== History ==
The place name is derived from an Indo-Germanic language root "*tellevo", which means usable soil. The village was first mentioned in a document in 1133 as Telves. The population of Telfes is called Telfer (not Telfeser). The reason is the Rhaeto-Romanic origin of the place name. This ends with the Latin nominative ending -s, derivations are therefore formed without -s. This was the court seat for the Stubaital before it was moved to Mieders in 1690. The blacksmith's trade has been documented since 1541. Later on, iron production was added to the trade, which furthered the wealth of the village. Even today, numerous representations of iron producers on the old farms of the village bear witness to this tradition, which brought good fortune to the valley.

== Personalities ==
- Andreas Kofler, Austrian ski jumper

== Politics ==
- Present Mayor: Georg Viertler
- His deputy: Peter Lanthaler
