= Helmut Schmuck =

Austrian long-distance runner

Personal information
- Nationality: Austrian
- Born: 7 April 1963 (age 63) Sankt Martin bei Lofer

Sport
- Sport: Mountain running Sport of athletics
- Event: Marathon

Helmut Schmuck (born 7 April 1963) is an Austrian long-distance runner from Salzburg (federal state). He competed in the men's marathon at the 1992 Summer Olympics. His personal best time of 2:13.17 was set at the Vienna City Marathon in 1990. He also is a two-time Austrian national athletic champion over 10,000 meters.

After the Olympics, he decided to specialize in mountain running, succeeding in regional (Austrian, German, Swiss, French and Italian) competitions, culminating in finishing in second place in the 2003 European Mountain Running Championships in Trentino-Alto Adige, after which he retired from competition. Currently, he coaches numerous Austrian athletes competing in mountain races while serving on the police force.
