= Costantino Bertolla =

Italian mountain runner

Personal information
- Nationality: Italian
- Born: 17 May 1963 (age 63)

Sport
- Country: Italy
- Sport: Mountain running
Medal record
Event	1st	2nd	3rd
World Championships Individual	1	1	1
World Championships Team	4	1	0
Total	5	1	1

Costantino Bertolla (born 17 May 1963) is a former Italian male mountain runner who won 1990 World Mountain Running Championships.

== Biography ==
He won also one national championships at individual senior level.

== National titles ==
- Italian Mountain Running Championships
  - Mountain running: 1991
