= Davide Milesi =

Italian long-distance runner

Personal information
- Nationality: Italian
- Born: December 27, 1964 (age 61) Bergamo

Sport
- Country: Italy
- Sport: Athletics
- Event: Long-distance running

Davide Milesi (born 27 December 1964) is a retired long-distance runner from Italy.

== Biography ==
He represented his native country at the 1996 Summer Olympics in Atlanta, Georgia. There he finished in 50th place in the men's marathon. He won the gold medal in the men's marathon race at the 1993 Mediterranean Games on 1993-06-20 in Narbonne, France, finishing in 2:18:42.

== Achievements ==
Year	Competition	Venue	Position	Notes
Representing Italy
1993	Mediterranean Games	Narbonne, France	1st	2:18:42
1996	Olympic Games	Atlanta, United States	50th	2:21:45
