= Isabelle Guillot =

French athlete (born 1961)

Personal information
- Nationality: French
- Born: 25 October 1961 (age 65)

Sport
- Event: Mountain Trail Running

Isabelle Guillot is a French athlete, born in 1961, who is a specialist in Mountain trail running, who runs for the Blagnac Sporting Athletic Club. She began to run conventional distance running athletic competitions later, in 1986, while still a young teacher. She is Co-author (with Serge Moro) of the book Courir Grandeur Nature.

== Prize list ==
- 32 National team selections for France, 6 National team selections for France in the marathon, semi-marathon and ekiden .
- (gold) World Champion of Mountain Trail running in 1989, 1991, 1993 and 1997
- (gold) Mountain Trail running champion of Europe in 1996
- (gold) World Masters Mountain Running Championships 40-44 age-group in 2004
- (gold) Mountain trail running champion of France 14 times from 1989 to 1997, then 1999, 2004, 2005, 2006 and 2007
- (gold) France champion of veteran Mountain racing 8 times from 2001 to 2008
- (gold) Winner of the National Mountain Running Challenge 6 times from 2003 to 2008
- (gold) French champion in the marathon in 1997
- (gold) Winner of southwest interregional in cross-country in 2001
- (gold) Champion of Midi-Pyrénées in cross-country 2003
- (gold) Marvejols-Mende winner in 1997
- Semi-marathon at d'Auch; en 1996 : 1 h 11 min 55 s
- (silver) Vice-champion in world mountain racing 1994, 1995 and 1996
- (silver) Vice-champion of France 10 km in 1997
- (silver) Vice-champion of France in mountain racing in 2000, 2003 and 2008
- (bronze) Bronze Medal (Team) at European Marathon Championships: 1994
- (bronze) Bronze medal at the World Trophy Mountain Running Competition in 1988 and 2006.
- (bronze) Bronze medal at the World Challenge long-distance mountain race in 2004 and 2005.
- (bronze) Bronze medal at the Mountain Running Championship in France in 2001 and 2002.
