= Lucio Fregona =

Italian mountain runner

Personal information
- Nationality: Italian
- Born: 21 January 1964 (age 62) Asolo

Sport
- Country: Italy
- Sport: Mountain running
Medal record
Event	1st	2nd	3rd
World Championships Individual	1	0	1
World Championships Team	9	2	0
Total	10	2	1

Lucio Fregona (born 21 January 1964) is a former Italian male mountain runner who won 1995 World Mountain Running Championships.

== Biography ==
With 12 participation in the World championships (1986, 1988-1990, 1992-1993, 1995-1999, 2001), he is the second Italian after Marco De Gasperi with 15. He also won one national championships at individual senior level.

== World championships team results ==
- (gold) short distance: 1988, 1989, 1990 (3)
- (gold) long distance: 1995, 1996, 1997, 1998, 1999, 2001 (6)
- (silver) short distance: 1986, 1992

== National titles ==
- Italian Mountain Running Championships
  - Mountain running: 1996
