= 2006 World Snowshoe Championships =

1st edition of the World Snowshoe Championships

- Host city: Schladming
- Country: Austria
- Events: 7.8 km (men, women)
- Opening: March 21, 2006
- Closing: March 21, 2006
- Website: worldsnowshoe.org

The 2006 World Snowshoe Championships was the 1st edition of the global snowshoe running competition, World Snowshoe Championships, organised by the World Snowshoe Federation and took place in Schladming, Dachstein Glacier on 21 March 2006.

== Results ==
The race Dachstein Xtreme, held on the distance of 7.8 km, has compiled two different ranking (male and female) overall, it was the mass start system.

=== Men's overall ===
Rank	Athlete	Country	Time
1st place, gold medalist(s)	Emanuele Manzi	Italy	26:41
2nd place, silver medalist(s)	Claudio Cassi	France	26:52
3rd place, bronze medalist(s)	Filippo Barizza	Morocco	28:47

=== Women's overall ===
Rank	Athlete	Country	Time
1st place, gold medalist(s)	Maria Grazia Roberti	Italy	32:26
2nd place, silver medalist(s)	Rebecca Harman	United States	39:19
3rd place, bronze medalist(s)	Rauni Parantain	Finland	41:01
