= 2007 World Snowshoe Championships =

- Host city: Schladming
- Country: Austria
- Events: 11 km (men, women)
- Opening: April 6, 2007
- Closing: April 6, 2007
- Website: worldsnowshoe.org

The 2007 World Snowshoe Championships was the 2nd edition of the global snowshoe running competition, World Snowshoe Championships, organised by the World Snowshoe Federation and took place in Schladming, Dachstein Glacier on 6 April 2007.

== Results ==
The race Dachstein Xtreme, held on the distance of 11 km, compiled two different rankings (male and female) overall, it was the mass start system.

=== Men's overall ===
Rank	Athlete	Country	Time
1st place, gold medalist(s)	Claudio Cassi	Italy	53:38
2nd place, silver medalist(s)	Antonio Santi	Italy	
3rd place, bronze medalist(s)	Daniele Cappeletti	Italy	59:23

=== Women's overall ===
Rank	Athlete	Country	Time
1st place, gold medalist(s)	Cristina Scolari	Italy	1:06:02
2nd place, silver medalist(s)	Sandrine Schornoz	Switzerland	1:10:27
3rd place, bronze medalist(s)	Laurie Lambert	United States	1:18:40
