= 2010 World Snowshoe Championships =

- Host city: Vancouver
- Country: Canada
- Events: 10 km (men, women)
- Opening: February 27, 2010
- Closing: February 2, 2010
- Website: worldsnowshoe.org

The 2010 World Snowshoe Championships was the 3rd edition of the global snowshoe running competition, World Snowshoe Championships, organised by the World Snowshoe Federation and took place in Vancouver, Dachstein Glacier on 27 February 2010.

== Results ==
The race World Snowshoe Invitational (contested during Vancouver 2010 Winter Olympics), held over a distance of 10 km, has compiled two different ranking (male and female) overall. It used the mass start format.

=== Men's overall ===
Rank	Athlete	Country	Time
1st place, gold medalist(s)	Antonio Santi	Italy	49:56
2nd place, silver medalist(s)	Tarcis Ancay	Switzerland	50:01
3rd place, bronze medalist(s)	Jonathan Wyatt	New Zealand	50:29

=== Women's overall ===
Rank	Athlete	Country	Time
1st place, gold medalist(s)	Maria Grazia Roberti	Italy	57:05
2nd place, silver medalist(s)	Keri Nelson	United States	57:42
3rd place, bronze medalist(s)	Syl Corbett	Canada	1:00.32
