= 2016 World Snowshoe Championships =

- Host city: Vezza d'Oglio
- Country: Italy
- Events: 9.5 km (men, women)
- Opening: February 5, 2016
- Closing: February 6, 2016
- Website: worldsnowshoe.org

The 2016 World Snowshoe Championships was the 9th edition of the global snowshoe running competition, World Snowshoe Championships, organised by the World Snowshoe Federation and took place in Vezza d'Oglio from 5 to 6 February 2016.

== Results ==
The 9.5 km race has compiled two different ranking (male and female) overall. It used the mass start format and more than 100 competitors participated.

=== Male Overall ===
Rank	Athlete	Country	Time
1st place, gold medalist(s)	Stephane Ricard	France	32:49
2nd place, silver medalist(s)	Fillipo Barizza	Italy	
3rd place, bronze medalist(s)	Roberto Ruiz Revoelta	Spain	

=== Female Overall ===
Rank	Athlete	Country	Time
1st place, gold medalist(s)	Isabella Morlini	Italy	32:49
2nd place, silver medalist(s)	Ragna Debats	Netherlands	
3rd place, bronze medalist(s)	Rosa Vals Tio	Spain	
