= 2018 World Snowshoe Championships =

Snowshoe running race

- Host city: Picos de Europa
- Country: Spain
- Events: 10 kilometres (men, women, masters)
- Opening: 2 March 2018
- Closing: 3 March 2018
- Website: worldsnowshoe.org

The 2018 World Snowshoe Championships was the 11th edition of the global snowshoe running competition, World Snowshoe Championships, organised by the World Snowshoe Federation and took place in Picos de Europa, Spain on 2 and 3 March 2018.

== Results ==
=== Male Overall ===
Rank	Athlete	Country	Time
1st place, gold medalist(s)	Stephane Ricard	France	46:23
2nd place, silver medalist(s)	Joseph Gray	United States	48:24
3rd place, bronze medalist(s)	Roberto Ruiz	Spain	48:55

=== Female Overall ===
Rank	Athlete	Country	Time
1st place, gold medalist(s)	Michelle Hummel	United States	57:05
2nd place, silver medalist(s)	Ragna Debats	Netherlands	1:01:21
3rd place, bronze medalist(s)	Sandra Sevillano Guerra	Spain	1:05:21
