= 2013 World Snowshoe Championships =

- Host city: Fondo
- Country: Italy
- Events: 5.6 km (men, women)
- Opening: January 6, 2013
- Closing: January 6, 2013
- Website: worldsnowshoe.org

The 2013 World Snowshoe Championships was the 6th edition of the global snowshoe running competition, World Snowshoe Championships, organised by the World Snowshoe Federation and took place in Fondo, Italy on 6 January 2013.

== Results ==
The race Ciaspolada, held over a distance of 5.6 km, has compiled two different ranking (male and female) overall. It used the mass start system and more than 100 competitors participated.

=== Men's overall ===
Rank	Athlete	Country	Time
1st place, gold medalist(s)	Alex Baldaccini	Italy	19:55
2nd place, silver medalist(s)	Stephane Ricard	France	20:02
3rd place, bronze medalist(s)	Said Boudalia	Morocco	20:06

=== Women's overall ===
Rank	Athlete	Country	Time
1st place, gold medalist(s)	Isabella Morlini	Italy	
2nd place, silver medalist(s)	Laia Trias Andreu	Spain	
3rd place, bronze medalist(s)	Maria Grazia Roberti	Italy	
