= 2012 World Snowshoe Championships =

- Host city: Quebec City
- Country: Canada
- Events: 10 km (men, women)
- Opening: March 11, 2012
- Closing: March 11, 2012
- Website: www.worldsnowshoe.org

The 2012 World Snowshoe Championships was the 5th edition of the global snowshoe running competition, World Snowshoe Championships, organised by the World Snowshoe Federation and took place in Quebec City in Canada on 11 March 2012.

== Results ==
The race, held over a distance of 10 km, has compiled two different ranking (male and female) overall. It used the mass start format, with more than 100 competitors participating.

=== Men's overall ===
Rank	Athlete	Country	Time
1st place, gold medalist(s)	David Le Porho	Canada	45:25:00
2nd place, silver medalist(s)	Eric Hartmark	United States	46:04:00
3rd place, bronze medalist(s)	Stéphane Ricard	France	46:13:00
4	Antonio Santi Vignola	Italy	47:01:00
5	Greg Hexum Esko	United States	48:06:00
6	Joël Bourgeois	Canada	48:14:00
7	Kevin Tilton	Canada	48:23:00
8	Shaun Stephens-Whale	Canada	48:53:00
9	Derrick St-John	Canada	49:05:00
10	Alexy Viktor Sherbrooke	Canada	49:10:00

=== Women's overall ===
Rank	Athlete	Country	Time
1st place, gold medalist(s)	Maria Grazia Roberti	Italy	55:08:00
2nd place, silver medalist(s)	Amber Ferreira	United States	57:41:00
3rd place, bronze medalist(s)	Mélanie Nadeau	Canada	59:44:00
4	Mélissa Chénard	Canada	01:00:08
5	Elizabeth Primrose	Canada	01:01:28
6	Laurie Lambert	United States	01:01:48
7	Marie-Josée Dufour	Canada	01:03:08
8	Evelyne Blouin	Canada	01:03:36
9	Tina-Marie Poulin	United States	01:05:45
10	Kellie Grégoire	United States	01:11:08
