= 2015 World Snowshoe Championships =

8th edition of global snowshoe running competition

- Host city: Quebec City
- Country: Canada
- Events: 10 km (men, women)
- Opening: January 31, 2015
- Closing: January 31, 2015
- Website: worldsnowshoe.org

The 2015 World Snowshoe Championships was the 8th edition of the global snowshoe running competition, World Snowshoe Championships, organised by the World Snowshoe Federation and took place in Quebec City on 31 January 2015.

== Results ==
The race, held over a distance of 10 km, compiled two different ranking (male and female) overall. It used the mass start format and more than 200 snowshoers participated in it.

=== Male Overall ===
Rank	Athlete	Country	Time
1st place, gold medalist(s)	Maxime Leboeuf	Canada	46:40
2nd place, silver medalist(s)	Just Sociats	Spain	46:58
3rd place, bronze medalist(s)	Joël Bourgeois	Canada	47:10
4	Stéphane Richard	France	48:58
5	David Savard-Gagnon	Canada	49:05
6	Joël Desgreniers	Canada	49:12
7	Samuel Blanchette	Canada	49:17
8	Eric Hartmark	United States	49:41
9	Olivier Babineau	Canada	49:49
10	Nacho Hernando-Augulo	Spain	49:56

=== Women's overall ===
Rank	Athlete	Country	Time
1st place, gold medalist(s)	Sarah Bergeron-Larouche	Canada	57:28
2nd place, silver medalist(s)	Laia Andreu	Spain	57:41
3rd place, bronze medalist(s)	Rosa Valls	Spain	1:00:02
4	Amber Ferreira	United States	1:00:36
5	Evelyne Blouin	Canada	1:01:32
6	Silvia Leal	Spain	1:01:56
7	Valérie Bélanger	Canada	1:02:41
8	Abbey Wood	United States	1:03:43
9	Claude Godbout	Canada	1:05:59
10	Kristina Folcik	United States	1:06:29
