= World Snowshoe Championships =

Annual snowshoe running competition

- Status: active
- Genre: sporting event
- Date: mid-year
- Frequency: annual
- Location: various
- Inaugurated: 2006
- Most recent: 2022
- Organiser: WSSF

The World Snowshoe Championships are annual snowshoe running competition, held for the first time in 2006 and organised by the World Snowshoe Federation.

== Editions ==
Edition	Year	Venue	Valley	Nation
1st	2006	Schladming	Dachstein Glacier	Austria
2nd	2007	Schladming	Dachstein Glacier	Austria
3rd	2010	Vancouver	British Columbia	Canada
4th	2011	Myoko	Mount Myōkō	Japan
5th	2012	Quebec City	Quebec	Canada
6th	2013	Fondo	Val di Non	Italy
7th	2014	Rättvik	Dalarna County	Sweden
8th	2015	Quebec City	Quebec	Canada
9th	2016	Vezza d'Oglio	Val Camonica	Italy
10th	2017	Saranac Lake	Adirondack Park	United States
11th	2018	Picos de Europa	Cantabria	Spain
12th	2019	La Ciaspolada	Val di Non	Italy
13th	2020	Ikenotaira Ski Resort	Myoko City	Japan
14th	2022	Copahue Extremo	Caviahue	Argentina
15th	2024	Picos de Europa	Cantabria	Spain

== Medals ==
=== Men ===
Year	Gold			Silver			Bronze		
2006	Emanuele Manzi	Italy	26:41	Claudio Cassi	France	26:52	Filippo Barizza	Morocco	28:47
2007	Claudio Cassi	Italy	53:38	Antonio Santi	Italy		Daniele Cappeletti	Italy	59:23
2010	Antonio Santi	Italy	49:56	Tarcis Ancay	Switzerland	50:01	Jonathan Wyatt	New Zealand	50:29
2011	David Le Porho	Canada	1:35:48	Joseph Gray	United States	1:35:49	Hiroyuki Urano	Japan	1:44:16
2012	David Le Porho	Canada	45:25	Eric Hartmark	United States	46:04	Stéphane Ricard	France	46:13
2013	Alex Baldaccini	Italy	19:55	Stephane Ricard	France	20:02	Said Boudalia	Morocco	20:06
2014	Stephane Ricard	France	37:28.3	Fillipo Barizza	Italy	37:46.3	Just Sociats Asensio	Spain	38:15.2
2015	Maxime Leboeuf	Canada	46:40	Just Sociats	Spain	46:58	Joël Bourgeois	Canada	47:10
2016	Stephane Ricard	France	32:49	Fillipo Barizza	Italy	33:01	Roberto Ruiz	Spain	33:16
2017	Joseph Gray	United States	28:22.05	Nacho Hernando-Angulo	Spain	29:33.77	Josiah Middaugh	United States	29:41.38
2018	Stephane Ricard	France	46:23	Joseph Gray	United States	48:24	Roberto Ruiz	Spain	48:55
2019	Cesare Maestri	Italy	28:46	Joseph Gray	United States	29:30	Alessandro Rambaldini	Italy	30:12
2020	Roberto Ruiz Revuelta	Spain	39:36	Ignacio Hernando Angulo	Spain	39:37	Stephane Ricard	France	40:19
2022	Javier Carriqueo	Argentina	57:10	Roberto Ruiz Revuelta	Spain	58:14	Eric Hartmark	United States	59:59
2024	Alex Baldaccini	Italy	44:04	Stephane Ricard	France	45:54	Roberto Ruiz Revuelta	Spain	46:03

=== Women ===
Year	Gold			Silver			Bronze		
2006	Maria Grazia Roberti	Italy	32:26	Rebecca Harman	United States	39:19	Rauni Parantain	Finland	41:01
2007	Cristina Scolari	Italy	1:06:02	Sandrine Schornoz	Switzerland	1:10:27	Laurie Lambert	United States	1:18:40
2010	Maria Grazia Roberti	Italy	57:05	Keri Nelson	United States	57:42	Syl Corbett	Canada	1:00.32
2011	Djamila Bengueche	France	1:53:02	Anne Marie Bais	France	1:53:56	Claire Doule	Canada	1:53:57
2012	Maria Grazia Roberti	Italy	55:08	Amber Ferreira	United States	57:41	Mélanie Nadeau	Canada	59:44
2013	Isabella Morlini	Italy		Laia Trias Andreu	Spain		Maria Grazia Roberti	Italy	
2014	Isabella Morlini	Italy	46:39.2	Petra Kindlund	Sweden	47:02.5	Mavi Gil Rafart	Spain	47:32.4
2015	Sarah Bergeron	Canada	57:28	Laia Andreu	Spain	57:41	Rosa Valls	Spain	1:00:02
2016	Isabella Morlini	Italy	32:49	Ragna Debats	Netherlands	39:19	Rosa Vals Tio	Spain	39:56
2017	Ragna Debats	Netherlands	34:57.41	Annie Jean	Canada	36:48.77	Michelle Hummel	United States	37:14.82
2018	Michelle Hummel	United States	57:05	Ragna Debats	Netherlands	1:01:21	Sandra Sevillano Guerra	Spain	1:05:21
2019	Anna Laura Mugno	Italy	36:54	Isabella Morlini	Italy	37:19	Michelle Hummel	United States	37:35
2020	Michelle Hummel	United States	49:33	Lucia Ibáñez González	Spain	54:13	Sara Canney	United States	54:17
2022	Jennifer Britz	United States	01:21:54	Verónica Galván	Argentina	01:27:59	Heidi Strickler	United States	01:29:18
2024	Verónica Galván	Argentina	57:33	Michelle Hummel	United States	58:33	Georgina Gabarro Morente	Spain	58:53
