= 2014 World Snowshoe Championships =

- Host city: Rättvik
- Country: Sweden
- Events: 9 km (men, women)
- Opening: January 31, 2014
- Closing: February 1, 2014
- Website: worldsnowshoe.org

The 2014 World Snowshoe Championships was the 7th edition of the global snowshoe running competition, World Snowshoe Championships, organised by the World Snowshoe Federation and took place in Rättvik, Sweden, from 31 January to 1 February 2014.

== Results ==
The 9 km race compiled two different ranking (male and female) overall. It used the mass start format and more than 100 competitors participated.

=== Men's overall ===
Rank	Athlete	Country	Time
1st place, gold medalist(s)	Stephane Ricard	France	37:28.3
2nd place, silver medalist(s)	Fillipo Barizza	Italy	37:46.3
3rd place, bronze medalist(s)	Just Sociats Asensio	Spain	38:15.2

=== Women's overall ===
Rank	Athlete	Country	Time
1st place, gold medalist(s)	Isabella Morlini	Italy	46:39.2
2nd place, silver medalist(s)	Petra Kindlund	Sweden	47:02.5
3rd place, bronze medalist(s)	Mavi Gil Rafart	Spain	47:32.4
