= 2011 World Snowshoe Championships =

- Host city: Myoko
- Country: Japan
- Events: 400 m 15 km (men, women); 15 km (men, women)
- Opening: February 12, 2011
- Closing: February 13, 2011
- Website: www.worldsnowshoe.org

The 2011 World Snowshoe Championships was the 4th edition of the global snowshoe running competition, World Snowshoe Championships, organised by the World Snowshoe Federation and took place in Myoko, Japan on 12 and 13 February 2011.

== Results ==
This edition of the championship included two events each for men and women, the 400 m and 15 km.

=== Men's 400 m ===
Rank	Athlete	Country	Time
1st place, gold medalist(s)	Joseph Gray	United States	
2nd place, silver medalist(s)	David Le Porho	Canada	
3rd place, bronze medalist(s)	Kenichi Nagatsuka	Japan	

=== Women's 400 m ===
Rank	Athlete	Country	Time
1st place, gold medalist(s)	Djamila Bengueche	France	57:28
2nd place, silver medalist(s)	Anne Marie Bais	France	57:41
3rd place, bronze medalist(s)	Yoshiko Sudo	Japan	1:00:02

=== Men's overall ===
Rank	Athlete	Country	Time
1st place, gold medalist(s)	David Le Porho	Canada	1:35:48
2nd place, silver medalist(s)	Joseph Gray	United States	1:35:49
3rd place, bronze medalist(s)	Hiroyuki Urano	Japan	1:44:16

=== Women's overall ===
Rank	Athlete	Country	Time
1st place, gold medalist(s)	Djamila Bengueche	France	1:53:02
2nd place, silver medalist(s)	Anne Marie Bais	France	1:53:56
3rd place, bronze medalist(s)	Claire Doule	Canada	1:53:57
