= Climate change in Austria =

Land-surface temperature in Austria 1743–2013 as 12-month and 10-year moving averages.

Global warming is affecting Austrian temperatures, weather, ecosystems and biodiversity. Since 1950 temperatures have risen by 1.8 °C, and in the past 150 years glaciers have melted, losing a significant amount of their volume. Changed precipitation patterns, increased temperatures, reduced snowfall, melting glaciers and more frequent extreme weather phenomenons, such as droughts, are expected effects from climate change. Ecosystems and biodiversity in Austria are facing changes due to increasing temperatures and the spread of thermophile species, heat and drought stress on animals and plants, an increase in alien and invasive species and an increase in pathogenic organisms and the spread of disease.

The Austrian economy is expected to be significantly affected by the effects of global warming, leading to costs of 4.2 to 5.2 billion Euros per year by the middle of the century. More frequent and intense weather events cause increasing costs for reconstruction and maintenance of infrastructure, fewer days with snow lead to a decline of overnight tourists in the winter, and a higher number of heat related health issues challenge the Austrian healthcare system.

To deal with the effects of global warming, mitigation efforts are being implemented from various directions. Politicians are planning to achieve climate neutrality by 2040 at the latest, as stated in the coalition agreement. As part of the European Union, Austria has to pursue efforts to reach the emission goals of the European Green Deal. Activists try to speed mitigation efforts up using petitions, campaigns and protests.

== Greenhouse gas emissions ==
According to Austria's national energy and climate strategy to reach the demands of the Paris Agreement, Austria has planned a reduction of greenhouse gas emissions of 36% by 2030 in relation to 2005 levels. As part of the European Union, Austria is obliged to contribute to the EU's climate targets of reducing greenhouse gas emissions by 55% until 2030 in comparison to 1990 levels, determined in the European Green Deal. In order to reach this goal, it has been proposed that Austria should increase its target to cut down emissions by 48% by 2030. Additionally, the Nehammer government (2021-2025) planned to bring Austria to carbon neutrality by 2040.

Austria has historically emitted 5.51 billion tons of CO_{2} as a result of burning of fossil fuels and cement production, contributing to a share of 0.32% of cumulative global CO_{2} emissions.

The following table shows Austria's greenhouse gas emissions in megatons of CO_{2} equivalents in past years, compared to the total EU27 and world emissions.

Year	Austria (Mt CO_{2}eq)	EU27 (Mt CO_{2}eq)	World (Mt CO_{2}eq)
1990	81.5	4 953	32 657
2000	85.5	4 555	36 420
2010	91.2	4 298	46 372
2015	85.0	3 950	49 415
2018	85.4	3 925	51 200

The table below shows the greenhouse gas emissions of Austria in tons of CO_{2} equivalents by capita in past years compared to the per capita emissions of the EU27 and the world.

Year	Austria (t CO_{2}eq/capita)	EU27 (t CO_{2}eq/capita)	World (t CO_{2}eq/capita)
1990	10.56	11.79	6.13
2000	10.60	10.63	5.93
2010	10.84	9.76	6.67
2015	9.79	8.94	6.70
2018	9.76	8.86	6.71

=== Energy consumption ===
Austria electricity supply by source

As of 2020, increased energy demand in transportation and construction have contributed to emission growth in the years before. 28% of Austria's energy came from renewables, making Austria a top player in the field, with biofuels and hydropower being the most important renewable energy sources in Austria. Nuclear energy is not present in Austria, due to it being banned in the Austrian Constitution. In accordance with its goal to be carbon neutral in 2040, Austria is working to be completely dependent on renewable energy sources by 2030 – in 2018 this share had already been 77%. Austria closed its last coal power plant in 2020 and targets ending coal and oil-fired heating by 2035.

Measures contained in Austria's 'National Energy and Climate Plan' to achieve the energy targets include an end of oil and coal heating in buildings, a prohibition of heating new buildings with natural gas, a large increase in the target for photovoltaic installations and extending carbon pricing to more sectors.

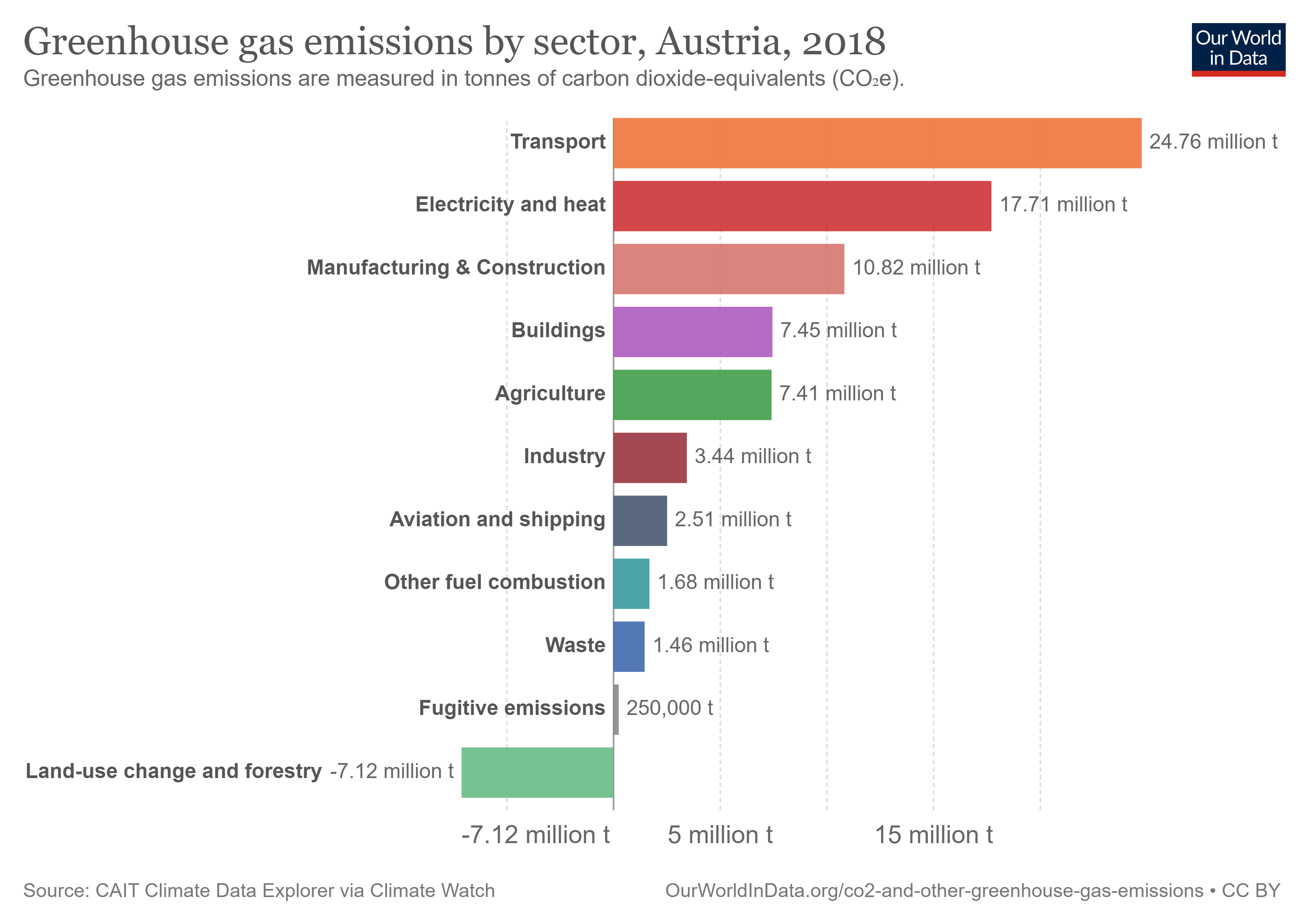
Greenhouse gas emissions in tonnes of carbon dioxide-equivalents (CO₂e) in Austria by sector until 2018.

=== Transportation ===
Making up 30% of emissions in 2019, the transportation sector then was Austria's largest contributing sector to global warming. Since 1990, emissions in the transportation sector have increased by 52% and there has been no significant reduction in CO_{2} emission since 2005. The largest amount of emissions is connected to road traffic and specifically passenger cars.

With October 26, 2021, the Federal Ministry for Climate Action, Environment, Energy, Mobility, Innovation and Technology introduced the so-called climate ticket. Purchasing this ticket allows using all means of public transport in the whole country for one year.

=== Largest emitters ===
Listed below is an overview of the ten largest emitters of CO_{2} equivalents registered in Austria in the European Union Emission Trading Scheme (EU ETS).

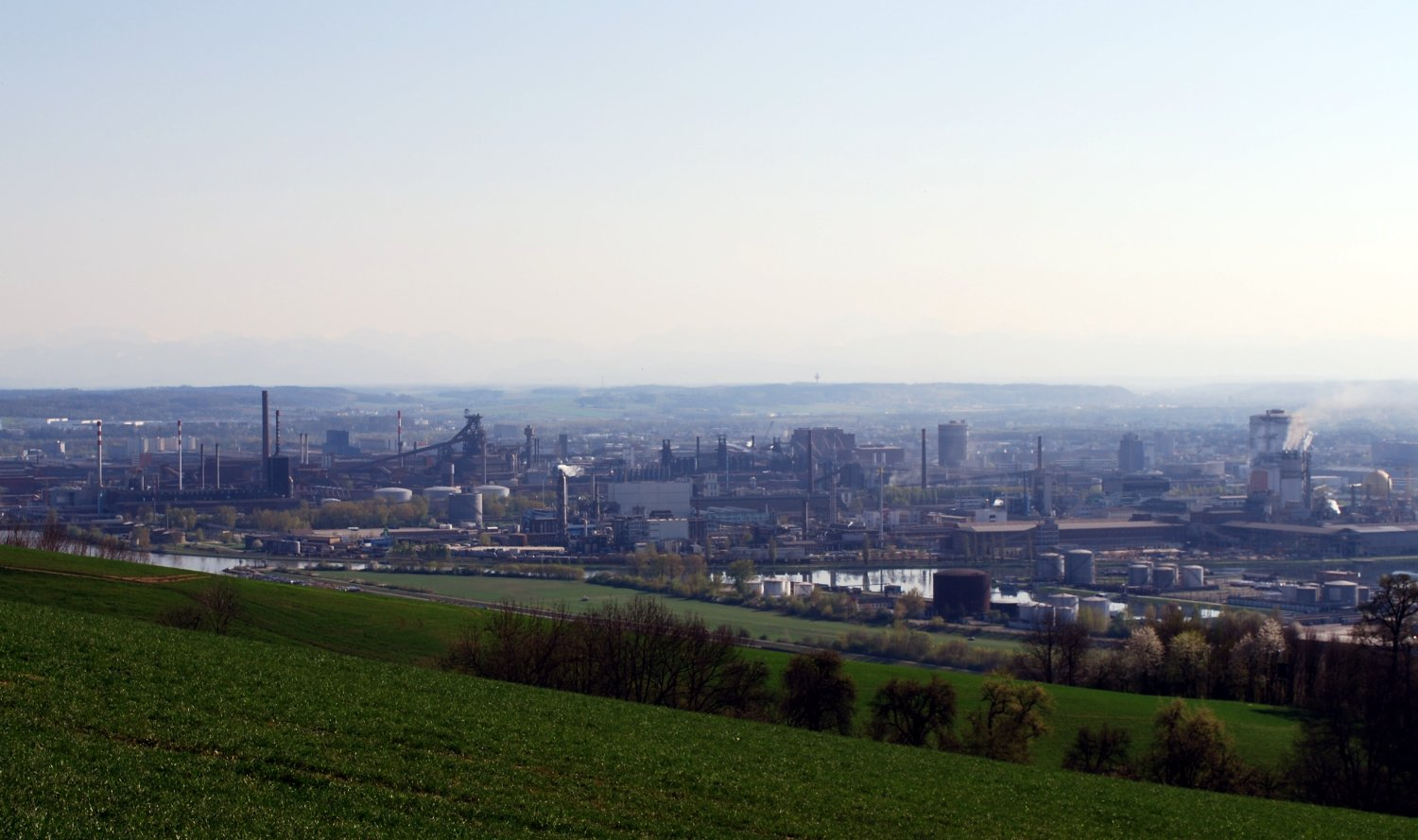
Voestalpine in Linz is the biggest emitter of CO_{2} equivalents in Austria

Large emitters in Austria
Emitter	Verified emissions (tonnes of CO_{2}e)	Registered activity	Year
Voestalpine Stahl Linz	7816077	Production of pig iron or steel	2018
Hüttenwerk Donawitz	2923552	Production of pig iron or steel	2018
Raffinerie Schwechat	2824369	Refining of mineral oil	2018
Austrian Airlines AG	874529	Airline	2018
Kraftwerk Simmering	817246	Combustion of fuels	2018
Fernheizkraftwerk Mellach	742168	Combustion of fuels	2018
Borealis Agrolinz Melamine	705651	Production of ammonia	2018
Dürnrohr Power Station	647794	Combustion of fuels	2018
Kraftwerk Donaustadt	630614	Combustion of fuels	2018
Lafarge Perlmooser	601756	Production of cement clinker	2018

== Impacts on the natural environment ==
=== Temperature changes ===
Temperatures in Austria increased by 1.8 °C between years 1951–2021, from a mean temperature of 8.7 °C after 1951 and about 10.5 °C before 2021. A mean increase of 0.12-0.19 °C per decade was seen between 1909 and 2008.

Current/past Köppen climate classification map for Austria for 1980–2016

Temperatures in Austria have risen 2 to 3 times faster than in other parts of the Northern Hemisphere. In the 20th century, temperatures rose by 1.8 °C, with temperature rises happening on all levels of elevation. Fourteen of the 20 hottest years since the beginning of temperature records in 1786 and 2019 were in the 21st century. Temperatures are rising faster in Austria compared to other parts of the world, due to Austria being a landlocked country, and possibly the northwards movement of the subtropical high. The North Atlantic Oscillation NOA has been linked to the increased temperatures in the Alps.

Climate models are pointing towards a further increase in temperature in Austria. At the end of the 21st century, it is possible that alpine temperatures could increase by 4-6 °C in winter and 3-5 °C in summer.

Predicted Köppen climate classification map for Austria for 2071–2100 under the most intense climate change scenario. Mid-range scenarios are currently considered more likely

The mid temperature in January and July is -0.6 °C and 20.7 °C in Vienna, the capital of Austria. BBC News published a four case scenario of the temperature increase in different cities around the world. The best-case scenario for Vienna implicate an increase with 3.1 °C in January and 2.4 °C in July, the medium-low scenario 4.3 °C and 3.8 °C, the medium-high scenario 4.7 °C and 4.6 °C, and the worst-case scenario implicates an increase with 7.0 °C and 7.2 °C by the year 2100, compared to 1900. The scenarios include assumptions on how much greenhouse gas is released into the atmosphere. Reductions in greenhouse gas emissions after a peak early in the century would be optimal for Austria, however unchecked emissions would be suboptimal.

=== Precipitation ===
Between 1990 and 2050, modelling has shown an 8% increase in precipitation in the northern Alps and 11% in the southern Alps, and summer precipitation is expected to decrease by 17% in the northern Alps and by 19% in the southern Alps.

An increase in rainfall during winter would mean intense snowfall in shorter periods of time and thus more avalanches.

==== Snow ====
Snowfall is expected to decrease, even with projected increases in winter precipitations, due to higher mean temperatures. The certainty of snow will be reduced.

The snow cover season in the European Alps, including snow water equivalent (SWE) and the duration of the snow cover, was assessed from regional climate model RCM experiments under the IPCC SRES A1B emission scenario. The assessment showed a decrease in SWE with 40-80% below 1500 m by mid century, compared to control years 1971–2000. Higher elevations are expected to be less affected than lower elevations. At 2000 – 2500 m SWE are expected to decrease by 10-60% by mid-century and by 30-80% at the end of the century.

The annual snow cover season is expected to be shorter. Less snow covers will mean less reflection of sunlight and thus further heating of earth, contributing to a negative feedback-loop.

=== Water resources ===
Bodies of water cover 43,000 hectares in Austria. There are approximately 6000 naturally developed stagnant bodies of water, of which 59% had a very good status, and 33% a good status, in 2014. Austria has running waters with a total length of around 31,000 km. In 2019 the share of rivers to be in a very good or good ecological status was assessed to be under 40%. 136 bodies of groundwater can be found in Austria, and in 2014 three of them were assessed to be in a bad chemical status, due to high nitrate concentrations.

The total annual water demand is approximately 3% of available water resources, corresponding to 2.6 billion m^{3}.

==== Glaciers ====
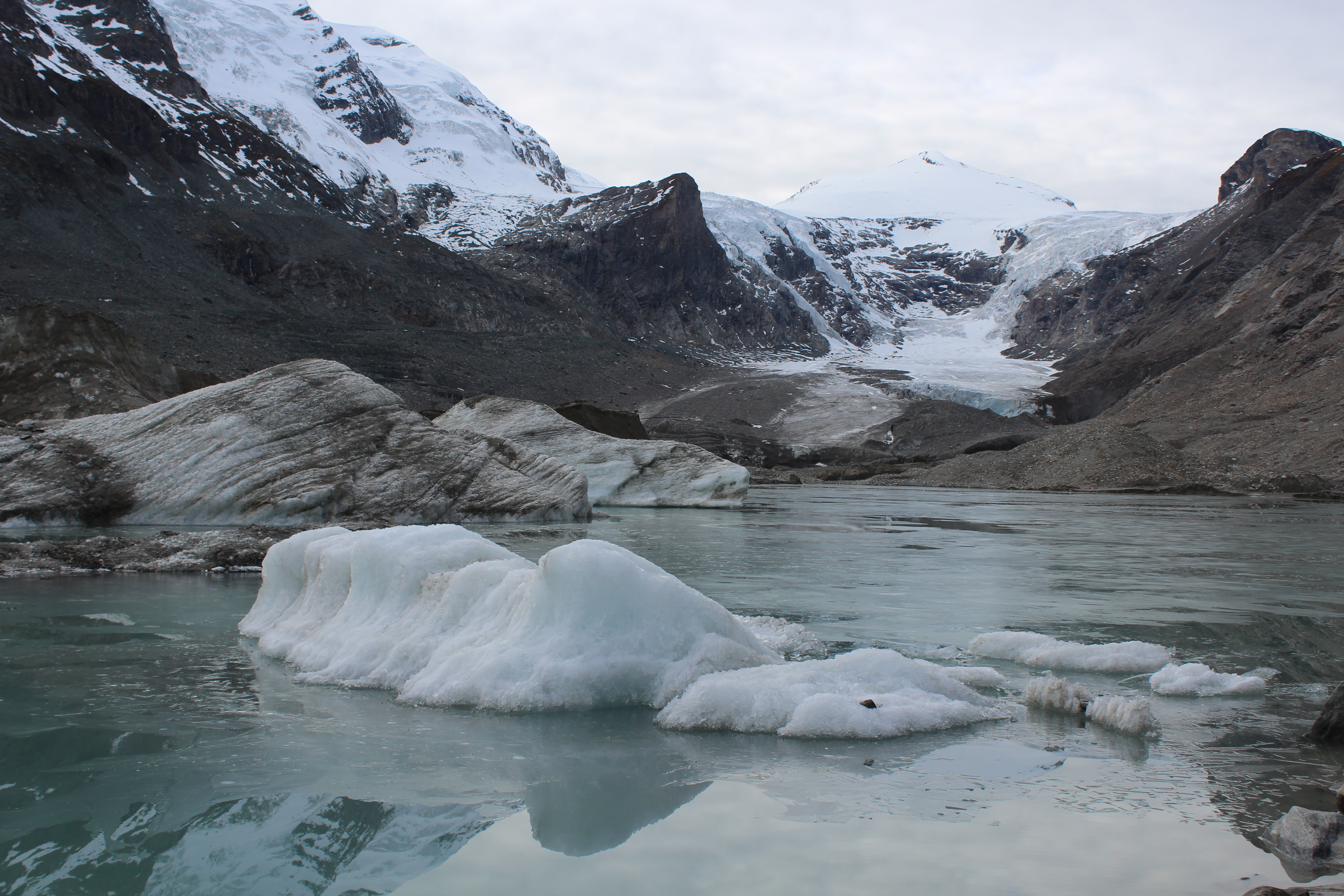
The Pasterze glacier in Eastern Austria.

Austria has almost 900 glaciers, being located in the area of the highest mountains, called the Central Alps. Like the global retreat of glaciers since 1850, glaciers in the Eastern Alps have lost 52% of their area and more than 60% of their mass within the last 150 years. The Dachstein glacier has been retreating since 1981 and has lost 44 million m^{3} until 2019. The glaciers are expected to reduce to less than 20% of their current mass by the end of the century, due to increasing temperatures.

=== Ecosystems ===
Austria has a diverse landscape, climate and biodiversity. The Pannonian Basin and Continental biogeographic regions converge. 32% of the Alpine Arc is located in Austria, the largest portion that any country holds.

The Alps, the forelands, basins, as well as the granite and gneiss highlands of the Bohemian Massif, are the major landscape divisions. Ecosystems and biodiversity are assessed to be highly vulnerable to future climate change impacts. There are some regional differences in what to expect from changes like the increased temperatures and new precipitation patterns. The alpine regions with a high share of endemic species are especially vulnerable to expected changes.

Higher temperatures will lead to plant transpiration beginning earlier and end later, meaning a lengthening of the growing season. Droughts will occur more and plants will be exposed to heat stress both due to droughts (decrease in rainfall during summer) and higher mean temperatures.

==== Alpine and mountain ecosystems ====
The Alps cover 60% of Austria's territory, and is the landscape contributing most to biodiversity.

The alpine and Montane ecosystems are vulnerable to climate changes, however the conservation status is generally better in the Alpine region than in the continental region. An improvement in the conservation status of species and habitats has been seen, mainly due to conservations projects concerning invasive species.

==== Forests ====
Austria has 4 million hectares of forest, covering almost 50% of the national territory. The forests consist of circa 80% timber production forests and the rest, circa 20%, are protection forests. Forest areas have increased, mainly in the Alps, over the past decades. Reforestation programmes are assessed to cause loss of important ecological habitats. 53 of 93 forest biotope types are red listed and assessed to be endangered. The lowland forests are more endangered than forest areas in higher elevations.

Spruce are the most common tree species. Spruces are not well adapted to increased temperatures and are vulnerable to heat stress. In a climate study by WWF Austria, conditions for spruces in the areas around Mühlviertel and Waldviertel would deteriorate due to expected precipitation decreases and drought stress. According to WWF areas around Styria, southern Burgenland in east Austria and the Donau region would also be especially vulnerable to heating. In these regions climate change impact would be so extreme that forestry is expected to be impossible in a sustainable way, or even at all.

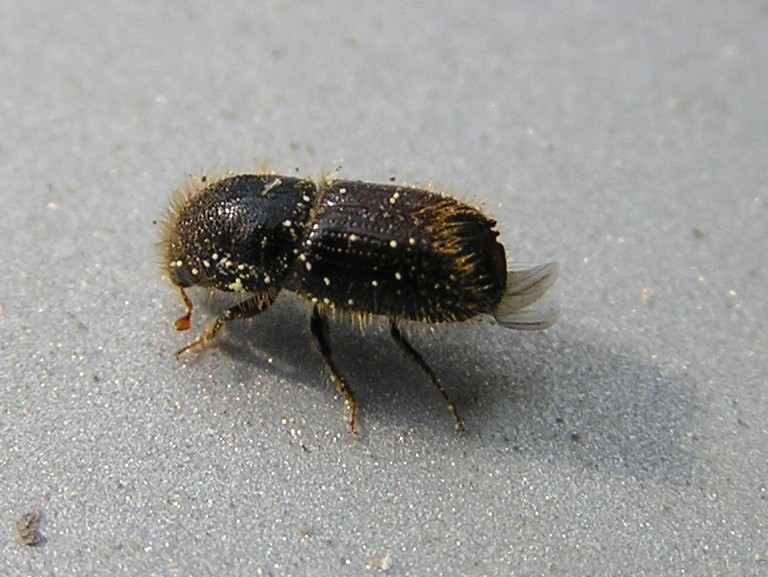
The European spruce bark beetle (Ips typographus).

Climate change result in many forest ecosystems experiencing stress due to less precipitation and/or increased temperatures. Extreme events like storms are becoming more frequent, leading to spread of pest infestations. As the stress on coniferous forests make them more vulnerable to pests, the bark beetle benefits from increasing temperatures. The bark beetle spreads rapidly and parasitizes on spruces, causing great damage and exposes them to even more stress, threatening the spruce forests.

Beech trees benefits from higher temperatures and are threatening to replace the spruce forests as the most dominating tree.

Overall the temperature increase and changed precipitation patterns will lead to a prolongation of the growing seasons (and therefore potential evapotranspiration), heat stress on many species and stress on trees fitted for a shorter season change.

=== Biodiversity ===
In general climate change will impact biodiversity by the spread of thermophilic organisms, melting and therefore reduced glaciers, phase shifting of native species, the displacement of species fitted for colder climates, and by the spread of alien and invasive species. The number of alien species are expected to increase in Austria. Alien species are assessed to be one of the most important threats against the conservation of habitat types. In 2009, there was around 2000 non-indigenous species documented, of which 90 where assessed to constitute a threat against nature conservation.

Lowland ecosystems including lakes and rivers, floodplain forests, tall herb vegetation, and dry grasslands are the ecosystems mainly affected by neophytes. The greatest impact on Austrian ecosystems are alien species that either are dominant and outcompete the native species or are parasitic on the native species important in the ecosystems, like insects or fungi parasitizing on trees. Fast growing trees like the black locust (Robinia pseudoacacia) and tall herbs like Japanese knotweed (Reynoutria japonica) are examples of species threatening ecosystems by outcompeting the native species.

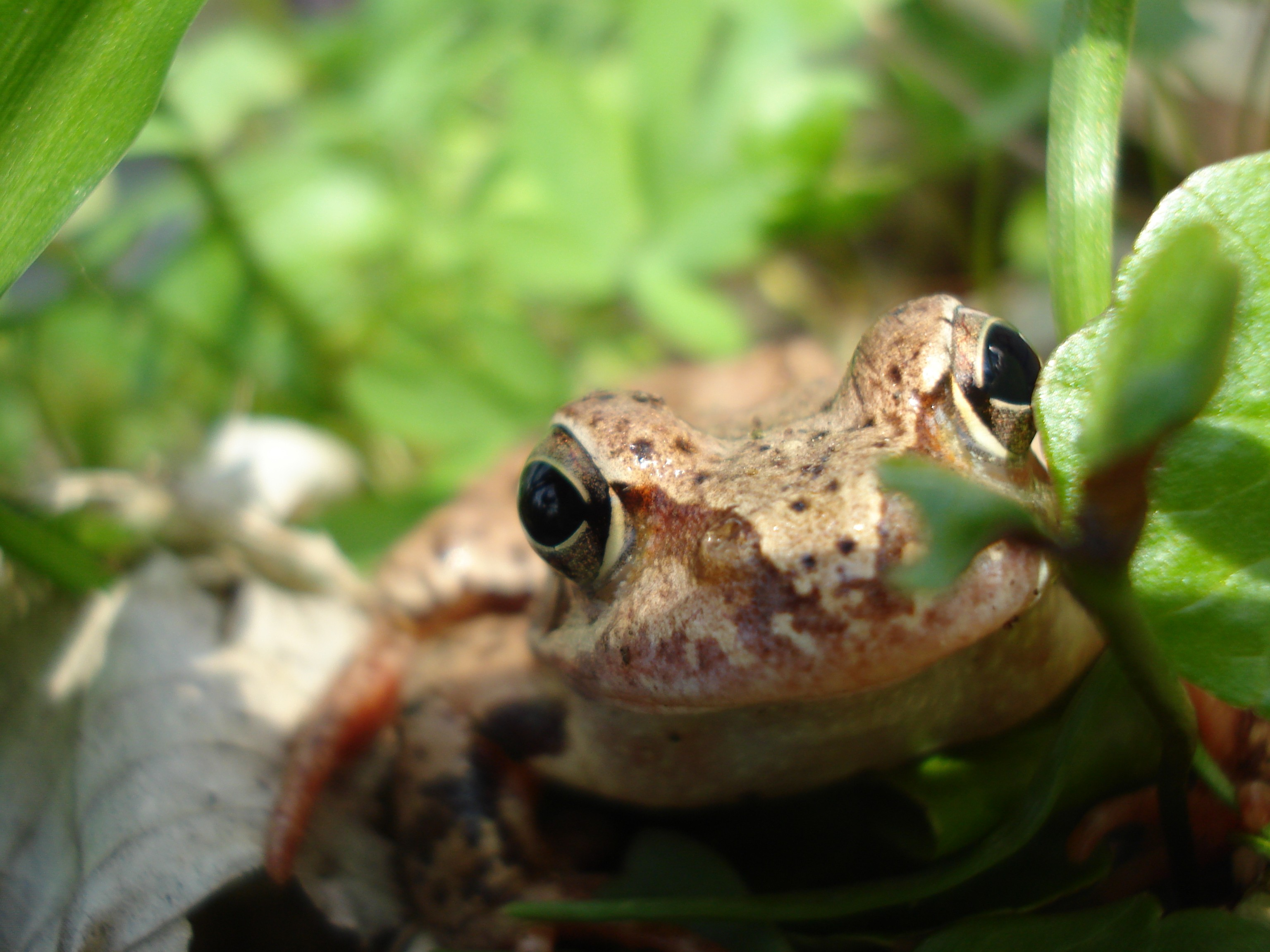
The agile frog, one of Austria's expected "climate losers".

46% of indigenous fish species are assessed to be under threat. Austrian fish are affected by river continuum interruptions such as power plants, dams, shipping, water level fluctuations, flood protection measures, abstraction of water, changes in the discharge and sedimentation regimes, and bank reinforcement. Pollution also affects Austrian fish, but to a lesser degree. The fish species spectrum are affected by fishing, mainly recreational, by impacting the resilience of the aquatic biocoenosis. Changing precipitation patterns and temperatures are expected to cause changed migration patterns for amphibians. By 2014 an earlier migration due to increased temperatures could not yet be verified, although it is expected to happen as temperatures increase further. Precipitation together with temperature is a migration factor. Different amphibian species migrate at different conditions and experts predict so-called "climate winners", like the green toad, and "climate losers", like the agile frog.

== Impacts on people ==
=== Economic impacts ===
The Interdisciplinary research programme COIN (Cost of Inaction - Assessing Costs of Climate Change for Austria) assessed the economic impacts of climate change in Austria in 2015. Climate change is expected to cost Austria on average 4.2 to 5.2 billion Euros per year in the 2050s, assuming a mid-range climate scenario, however more severe scenarios predict costs up to 8.8 billion Euros per year.

==== Agriculture ====
On average, potential crop yields are expected to grow due to climate change, caused by higher temperatures and increased CO_{2} availability for plants. The effects on crops are highly dependent on the location. In the west of Austria, where precipitation rates are high, conditions will become more favourable, whereas in the drier there will be a higher risks of crop losses east because of less rainfall and an increase in dry periods. A higher frequency of extreme weather events is threatening crops as well. The monetary benefit of higher crop yields could be reversed by a necessity of higher investment expenditures and a change in ecosystem services, as pollinators and natural pest control might be affected by climate change.

The Pannonian Basin in the East and the Granite and Gneiss Highlands is where most agriculture is found in Austria. The environmental situation of agriculture is assessed to be good with a high proportion of organic farms, but the participation in Agri-environmental measures are limited, both due to the natural climatic conditions and the willingness of farmers.

Besides environmental challenges, species and habitats are also impacted by agricultural trends showing an increased size of cultivated fields, growth in livestock per holding, and an increasing use of pesticides and fertilizers.

==== Forestry ====
The productivity of forests is estimated to decrease. Longer vegetation periods due to higher temperatures could lead to an increase in forest land in mountain forests, but in total the negative effects of longer dry periods, strong wind peaks and increased bark beetle harassment in warm summers overweigh and demand investments to uphold the forests' protection functions.

==== Tourism ====
Climate change will have significant impacts on tourism in Austria, reducing the number of overnight visitors especially in winter. Tourism is an important economic sector, contributing to 6% of Austria's gross domestic product in 2012. Although summer tourism could profit from climate change due to warmer temperatures and less rain, the negative impacts of reduced numbers of tourists in winter predominate. Less snow and fewer days with snow cover could lead to a loss of 600,000 to 1.5 million overnight stays per year in winter. Moderate climate change and socio-economic vulnerability would mean costs of 210 million Euros per year in the 2036-2065 period. Taking connections with other economic sectors into account, the overall economic losses are expected to be more than 60% higher.

==== Transport Infrastructure ====
Floodings, washout, landslides and mudflows induced by heavy precipitation are causing serious damage to the Austrian road network and cost the state 18 million Euros in 2014. Increased frequency of these events due to climate change and a growing expansion and connection of the road network are expected to increase these costs up to on average 40 million Euros per year in the 2036–2065 period. Although the building sector might profit from necessary maintenance work, costs for the whole Austrian economy are three times higher than the maintenance costs due to delays and losses of production as a result of inaccessible roads.

==== Disaster management ====
There is scientific consensus that climate change will increase the frequency as well as the intensity of floods and high waters have historically been a huge climate risk for Austria and caused serious damage. The damage costs for the flood in 2003 for example are estimated to be at 3 billion Euros. Extreme weather events are hard to predict, and the effect of climate change makes that even more difficult, but different approaches to estimate the monetary damages of floods in Austria all expect them to rise. Depending on the model, the expected average yearly damages reach from 430 to 1146 million Euros per year in the 2036-2065 period.

=== Health impacts ===
People in Austria will be exposed to increased heat stress due to climate change, with the growing elderly population being the most vulnerable. More heat days and longer heat periods will lead to a significant rise of heat-related health issues and deaths. The numbers are dependent on socio-economic vulnerability and especially on the strength of climate change. With moderate climate change and vulnerability, the number of heat related deaths is expected to reach on average 1060 per year in the 2036-2065 period. In the period 2003-2012 this number was at 240 per year. More pessimistic scenarios predict up to nearly 3000 heat related deaths per year in the 2036-2065 period. In addition, extreme heat periods challenge the functionality of the healthcare system with peak loads.

== Adaptation ==
=== Adaptation approaches ===
The Austrian Adaptation Strategy aims to support regions and municipalities to prepare for the consequences of climate change and implementing adaptation measures in compliance with criteria for good adaptation. A systematic evaluation of the success of the selected adaptation measures is to be carried out every five years. Important elements of this strategy are science and research, since, according to the government's research report, in-depth, integrative knowledge is required for the implementation of reasonable and urgently needed political, economic, ecological, and societal solutions. The current main strategy is to raise awareness at all levels, as well as to build precautionary infrastructure due to the expected frequency of extreme weather events.

=== Lockdown effect ===
To contain the spread of COVID-19 by 2020, measures were taken such as limiting people's mobility and reducing economic activities. These changes in daily life led to an abrupt decrease in anthropogenic CO_{2}-emissions in urban areas around the world. At the height of the crisis, daily CO_{2}-emissions fell by 17% worldwide. This is also shown by the analyses of the data from the Vienna research station. However, according to the scientists, the decrease in greenhouse gases and air pollutants will have little effect on the warming of the planet.

=== Adaptation of tourism ===
In Austrian tourism, climate change has an impact on winter as well as summer tourism. Climate change influences travel behaviour and brings changes in guest needs. In this context, the main concern is to find an alternative to the expected losses in winter. Summer and city tourism should therefore be promoted more intensively. In this context, Austrian tourism would like to establish the "Paris lifestyle". In this context, the "Paris lifestyle" means choosing a lifestyle on holiday and while travelling that contributes to meeting the climate targets agreed in Paris. It is about thinking about and taking action on climate change when booking, when travelling, when choosing accommodation, gastronomy, product development, but also in operational renewal measures, etc. This vision also includes the idea that a holiday in Austria in the future will be a flagship holiday that impresses with a wealth of experiences on the one hand and with avoidance and climate change adaptation measures on the other, across all different offers. Vacationing in Austria should be an invitation to consciously live the "Paris lifestyle" and to take home impulses for a climate-friendly lifestyle.

== Mitigation ==
=== Politics and legislation ===
In its coalition agreement for the period 2020 to 2024, the Austrian government has placed particular emphasis on the climate. This is partly due to the participation of the environmental party The Greens, besides the conservative party ÖVP in the government. The goals include climate neutrality by 2040 in compliance with the Paris Climate Agreement, as well as the advancement of a progress-oriented climate and energy policy in Europe and the world, improvement and concretization, climate protection-oriented energy planning, and an increase in the budget of the Climate and Energy Fund. These goals are to be concretized, among other things, through the expansion of renewable energies, a phase-out plan for fossil energy sources in the area of space heating, efforts against coal and nuclear power plants, digitalization and the bioeconomy.

=== International cooperation ===
Kyoto Protocol - In 1997, industrialized countries committed to reducing carbon dioxide emissions by 5% by 2012, compared to 1990 levels. This applied to industrialized countries, not emerging and developing countries, only the USA did not participate. In Kyoto, Austria pledged a reduction of 13% compared to 1990, but its emissions in 2012 were higher than in 1990. Therefore, it had to buy additional emission certificates, which can also be seen as penalties. The EU states as a whole achieved the Kyoto target.

Paris Agreement - The Paris Agreement was established in 2015 and involves 193 countries (192 countries and the European Union), with the US leaving in 2017 and re-entering in 2021. The goal of this agreement is to limit global warming to below 2 °C compared to pre-industrial levels. The Paris Agreement was accepted in December 2015 and became effective on 4 November 2016. It is the first legally binding agreement at the global level that contains commitments for all signatory states regarding climate protection actions. Austria has committed itself to becoming climate neutral by 2050 at the latest, without the use of nuclear energy. This means that greenhouse gas emissions shall approach zero. The remaining emissions will be reduced by carbon capture in natural sinks (forests, soils) and by permanent sequestration in products or technical storage.

== Activism ==
=== Climate petition 2020 ===
The climate petition ("Klimavolksbegehren") is an independent and non-partisan initiative started by many volunteers who want to stand up to climate policy together. In the meantime, it is supported by many other volunteers, numerous NGOs, civil society initiatives and famous personalities. The vision behind this is that Austria acts as a role model in climate protection. This climate protection is not seen as the responsibility of individuals, but as the responsibility of society as a whole. Politics should create the legal framework for this. The goal is to ensure a fair future worth living for children.

The demands of the initiative include a right to climate protection in the constitution, a binding, scientifically based CO_{2} budget in the climate protection law, a climate audit office that checks compliance with the CO_{2} budget, a climate check of existing and new climate-relevant laws and regulations, true costs and an eco-social tax reform. In addition, the complete dismantling of climate-damaging subsidies, a nationwide supply of climate-friendly mobility, as well as guaranteed financing of the energy transition. The period of signatures took place from 22 to 29 June 2020 in Austria. The petition reached a total of 380,590 signatures, which is 5.96% of the eligible voters. The governing parties ÖVP and Greens passed a resolution in spring 2021 to implement demands of the climate petition.

=== Climate Movement ===
Different grassroots group are active in Austria. Fridays for Future youth groups regularly organise climate protests in Austria. In the September 2019 climate strikes, between 65,000 and 150,000 people protested for better climate politics, among them 30,000 to 80,000 in Vienna and 16,000 to 18,000 in Innsbruck. The activist group "System Change, not Climate Change" has staged several actions for climate protection, among them disturbing a speech by the former Austrian chancellor Sebastian Kurz at the Austrian World Summit in Vienna in 2018.

=== Public Opinion ===
In a Eurobarometer opinion poll on climate change published in September 2008, 90% of Austrian respondents thought that climate change was a serious problem. In 2019, 86% of respondents said it was a serious problem, below the average of the 28 EU member states.

== Research ==
=== StartClim ===
StartClim is a climate research program founded in the year of 2002 by the climate research initiative Austroclim (formed research platform of Austrian scientists working in climate research) and the Federal Ministry of Climate Action, Environment, Energy, Mobility, Innovation and Technology. The purpose of it is to support politics and the economy against the challenges of climate change by providing a scientific basis and develop countermeasures. Researchers from various disciplines deal with climate change and its effects on Austria. In the context of the StartClim research programme, innovative programmes are funded which address current issues relating to climate change and the sustainable development goals. StartClim is designed as a flexible instrument to be able to quickly take up current topics in the field of climate change.

Each year, there is a call for proposals on specific topics, on which researchers can submit their ideas and projects.

The project 'Tapetenwechsel' (translated: change of scenery) is one example of the funded projects of Startclim. It is an initiative of "Klimabündnis Oberösterreich" (translated: Climate Alliance Upper Austria) and shows a scientifically based, graphic story of what a climate-friendly future could look like. It is based on numerous interviews with Austrian climate pioneers and scientists, and was created to make possible change experienceable and tangible. It aims to inspire conversations beyond the usual debate about renunciation and loss.

== See also ==
- Plug-in electric vehicles in Austria
