= 2017 World Snowshoe Championships =

- Host city: Saranac Lake, New York
- Country: United States
- Events: 10k (men, women, masters)
- Opening: February 24, 2017
- Closing: February 25, 2017
- Website: worldsnowshoe.org

The 2017 World Snowshoe Championships was the 10th edition of the global snowshoe running competition, World Snowshoe Championships, organised by the World Snowshoe Federation and took place in Saranac Lake, New York, from 24 to 25 February 2017.

== Results ==
The race, ran over a distance of 8 kilometers, compiled 16 different rankings, in addition to the two (male and female) overall, another 14 for the various categories masters.

=== Male Overall ===
Rank	Athlete	Country	Time
1st place, gold medalist(s)	Joseph Gray	United States	28:22.05
2nd place, silver medalist(s)	Nacho Hernando-Angulo	Spain	29:33.77
3rd place, bronze medalist(s)	Josiah Middaugh	United States	29:41.38

=== Female Overall ===
Rank	Athlete	Country	Time
1st place, gold medalist(s)	Ragna Debats	Netherlands	34:57.41
2nd place, silver medalist(s)	Annie Jean	Canada	36:48.77
3rd place, bronze medalist(s)	Michelle Hummel	United States	37:14.82
