= Joseph Gray (runner) =

American world champion runner

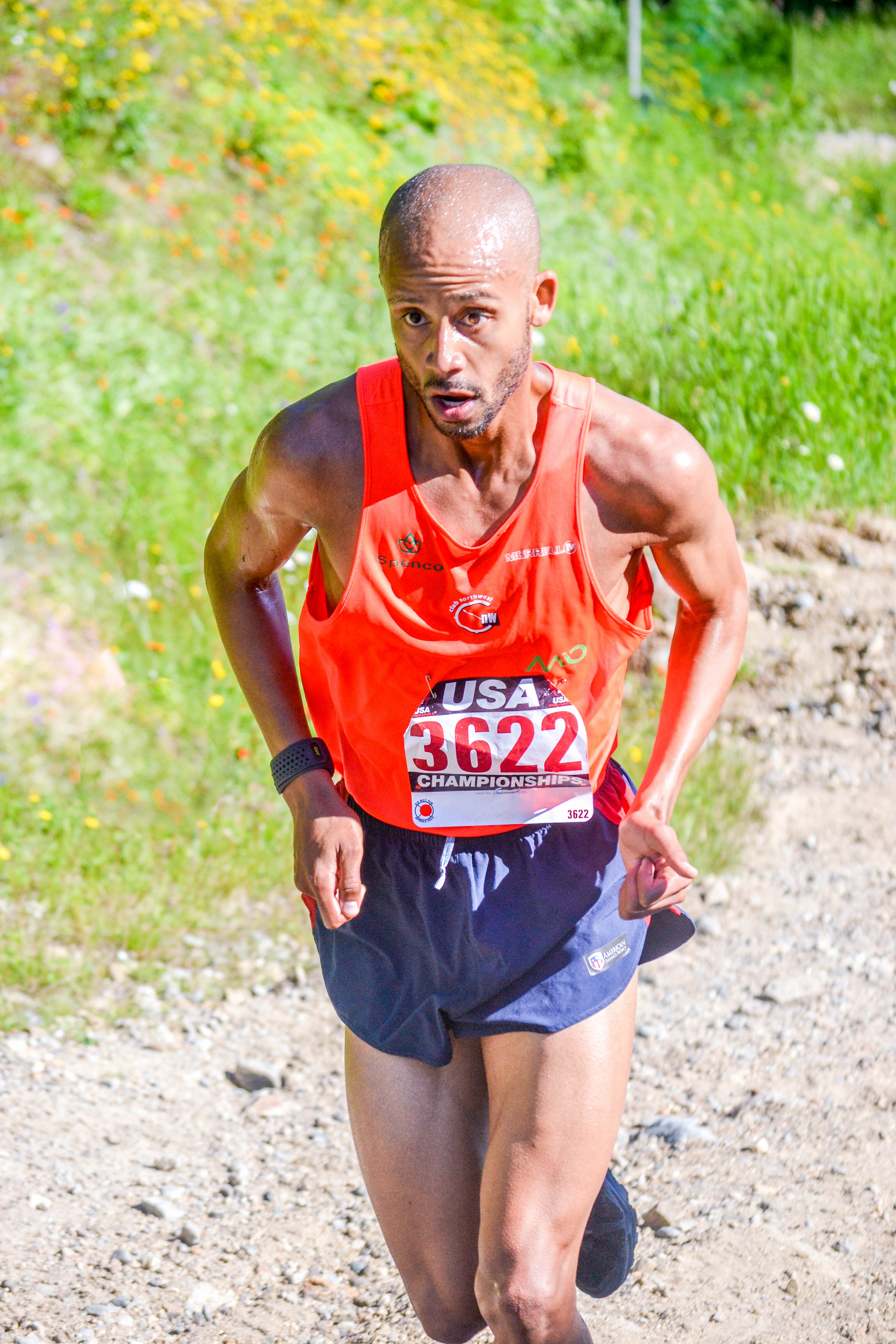

Personal information
- Nationality: American
- Born: January 20, 1984 (age 42)

Sport
- Country: United States
- Sport: Snowshoe running Trail running Mountain running Road running Cross country
- Club: Club Northwest
Medal record
Snowshoe running
World Championships
Gold medal – first place	2011 Myoko	400 m Sprint
Gold medal – first place	2017 Saranac Lake	Overall
Silver medal – second place	2011 Myoko	Overall

Joseph Gray (born January 20, 1984) is an American world champion runner who competes mostly in trail, mountain and snowshoe races. He won the World Mountain Running Championships in 2016. He is the first Black American to not only make the Team USA World Mountain Running Team, but also the first Black American to win the USA National Mountain Running Championships and the World Mountain Running Championships.

Gray was voted the greatest male mountain runner of all time by a poll conducted by the World Mountain Running Association.

== Biography ==
Gray's initial inspiration to compete was Simon Gutierrez. Gray has been a 28-time Team USA national team member. He is the only African-American to be part of the U.S. Mountain Running Team at any level. He is a 16-Time USA National Champion and was the first ever national champion at the 30k trail distance.

In 2012 he was the co-winner of the XTERRA Trail Run World Championships. In 2018 he became a 4-Time Xterra World Trail Running Champion after winning the Championship 3 years consecutively 2016–2018.

He is the American record holder at the Mount Washington Road Race. In August 2016, Gray won the Pikes Peak Ascent in a time of 2:05, the fastest climb since 1995. The following month, he won the World Mountain Running Championships which were held in Sapareva Banya, Bulgaria. In April 2017, Gray won the RRCA Colorado State Championship 5K Non-Road Race, held in conjunction with the Hams and Hamstrings 5K.

On July 20, 2018, Joseph Gray ran the fastest known time (FKT) up Mount Antero from the bottom of FS road 277 to the top of Mount Antero in 1:23:10. He used a running power meter during the attempt.

Gray has the FKT on the Manitou Incline in Colorado Springs with a time of 17:45 verified with GPS.

Mountain, Ultramarathon, Trail + Road Running + Cross Country World and National Titles
Gold	2009 USA Mountain Running National Champs
Gold	2011 USA 15k Trail Running National Champs
Gold	2012 USA Mountain Running National Champs
Gold	2012 USA 50k Ultramarathon Road Running National Champs
Gold	2013 USA Mountain Running National Champs
Gold	2013 USA 50k Ultramarathon Road Running National Champs
Gold	2013 USA Trail Half Marathon National Champs
Gold	2013 USA Cross Country National Champs (Clubs)
Gold	2014 USA Mountain Running National Champs
Gold	2015 Collegiate Running Assoc 10k Trail Running Champs
Gold	2016 North American Continental Vertical Kilometer Champs
Gold	2016 USA Mountain Running National Champs
Gold	2016 USA 30k Trail Running National Champs
Gold	2017 USA Mountain Running National Champs
Gold	2017 USA Trail Half Marathon National Champs
Gold	2018 North American Snowshoe Running Champs
Gold	2018 USA Mountain Running National Champs
Gold	2018 USA 30k Trail Running National Champs
Gold	2018 USA Trail Half Marathon National Champs

North American Central American and Caribbean Championship Titles & Pan American Championship Titles
Gold	2009 NACAC Mountain Running Champs
Gold	2010 NACAC Mountain Running Champs
Gold	2011 NACAC Mountain Running Champs
Gold	2012 NACAC Mountain Running Champs
Gold	2013 NACAC Mountain Running Champs
Gold	2018 NACAC Mountain Running Champs
Gold	2014 NACAC Cross Country Champs (First Athlete to win NACAC in XC and Mountain Running)
Gold	2018 Pan American Cross Country Championships
Gold	2015 Pan American Games Cross Country Championships (Team Medal)
