= San Clemente, Vezza d'Oglio =

Church building in Vezza d'Oglio, Italy

Coordinates: 45°51′24″N 10°08′03″E

Church of Saint Clement
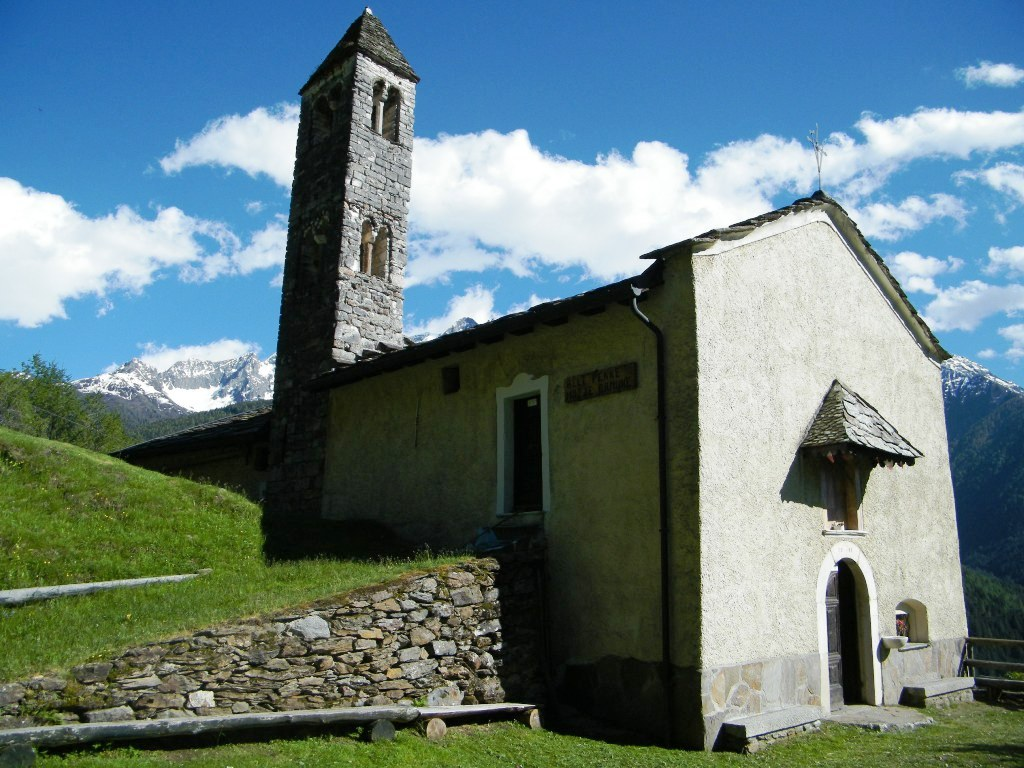
- Church of Saint Clement

Religion
- Affiliation: Catholic
- Province: Brescia
- Rite: Latin Rite

Location
- Location: Vezza d'Oglio, Italy
- Interactive map of Church of Saint Clement

Architecture
- Completed: 1585

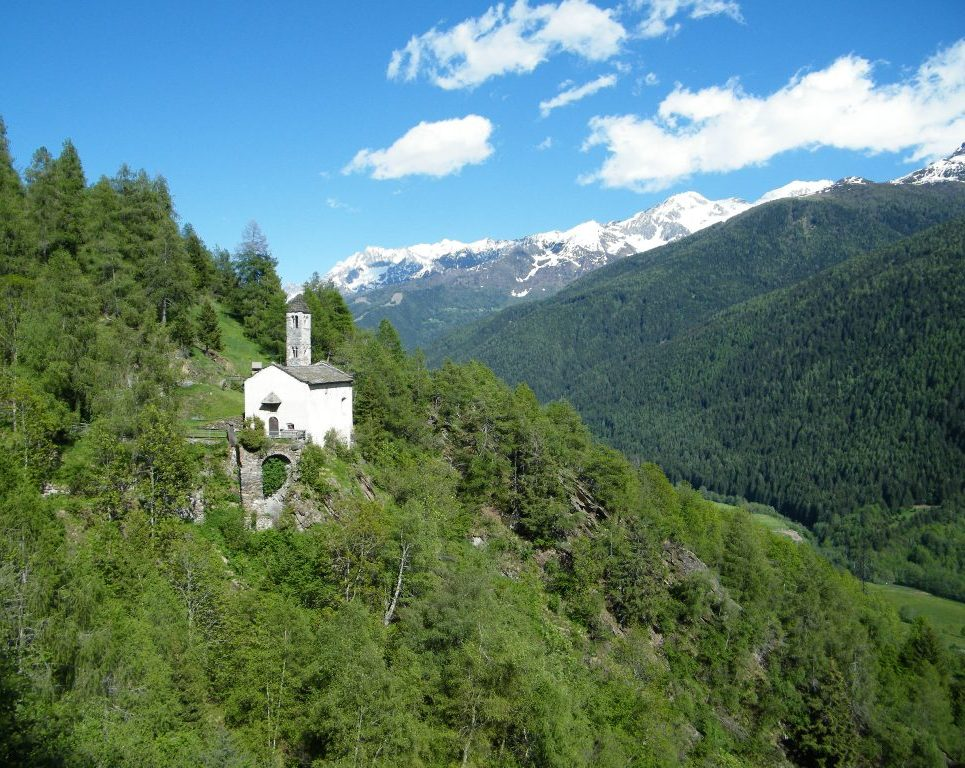
Saint Clement church in Vezza d'Oglio

The church of Saint Clement (Italian: Chiesa di San Clemente) lies in the territory of the Vezza d'Oglio comune in Valcamonica, Brescia province.

It can be reached by following an unpaved road from central Vezza until reaching a spur of rock offering a wide view on the underlying valley.

Only the bell tower, adorned by a double row of mullioned windows, remains of the original medieval structure; the body of the church was rebuilt in the 16th century.

It is believed that a religious guest accommodation was located in the neighborhood of the church, which, although itself located some height above the valley bottom, once lied on the hillside transit route.

According to Gregorio Brunelli this church was the original parish church of Vezza d'Oglio, but contemporary scholars believe this interpretation to be wrong.

In 1580, cardinal Carlo Borromeo ordered a complete renewal of the icanttype church: the date on the architrave, 1585, suggests this was completed in a relatively short time.

== See also ==
- Valcamonica
