= Dürnrohr Power Station =

Power station in Austria

Dürnrohr power station
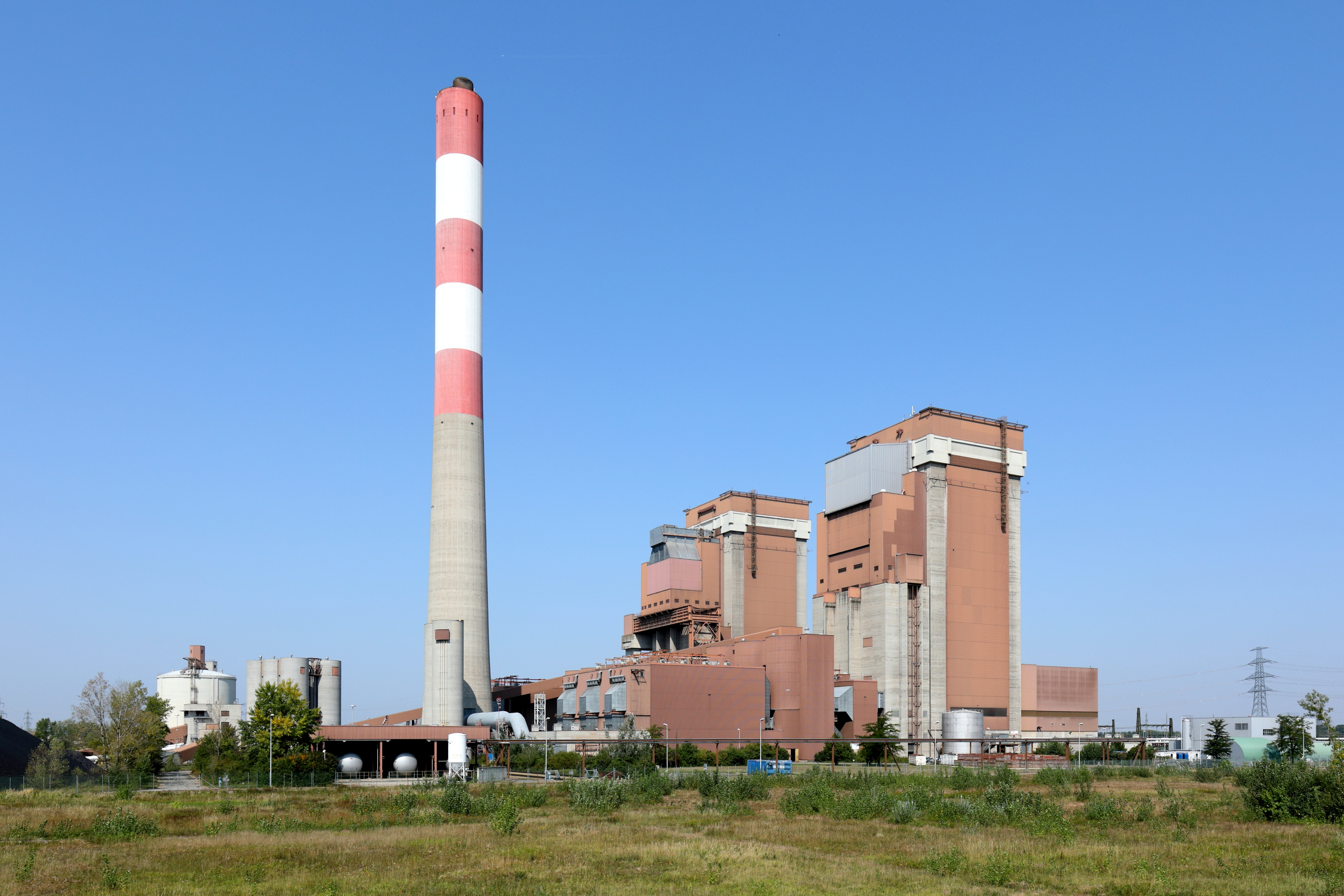
- Official name: Kraftwerk Dürnrohr
- Country: Austria
- Location: Zwentendorf, Lower Austria
- Coordinates: 48°19′32″N 15°55′25″E
- Status: Operational
- Commission date: 1987
- Decommission date: 1 September 2020
- Owners: VERBUND Austrian Thermal Power AG; Energie-Versorgung Niederösterreich AG

Thermal power station
- Primary fuel: Coal
- Secondary fuel: Natural gas
- Cogeneration?: Yes
- Thermal capacity: 1,000 MWt

Power generation
- Units operational: 1 x 352 MW
- Make and model: Siemens Power Generation
- Units decommissioned: 405 MW
- Nameplate capacity: 352 MW

External links
- Commons: Related media on Commons

The Dürnrohr power station is a thermal power station in Lower Austria.

The power station was built as a replacement for the Zwentendorf Nuclear Power Station, a plant that was finished but due to a 1978 referendum never started up. The Dürnrohr plant was built in its proximity in order to use the already established power lines and other infrastructure. It consists of two blocks: the first with output of 405 MW operated by VERBUND Austrian Thermal Power AG and the second with output 352 MW operated by the Energie-Versorgung Niederösterreich AG. The plant was finished in 1987.

The plant was powered by black coal imported from the Czech Republic and Poland but today it burns any type of coal and can also use natural gas. In 2004, a heating plant (largest such in Austria, at the time) using the dissipated waste heat was opened.

In 2009, the district heating pipeline from the power station to Sankt Pölten was erected from EVN Wärme. It is the longest district heating pipeline in Austria, with a length of 31 km.

The power station is one of the biggest emitters of CO_{2} in Austria.

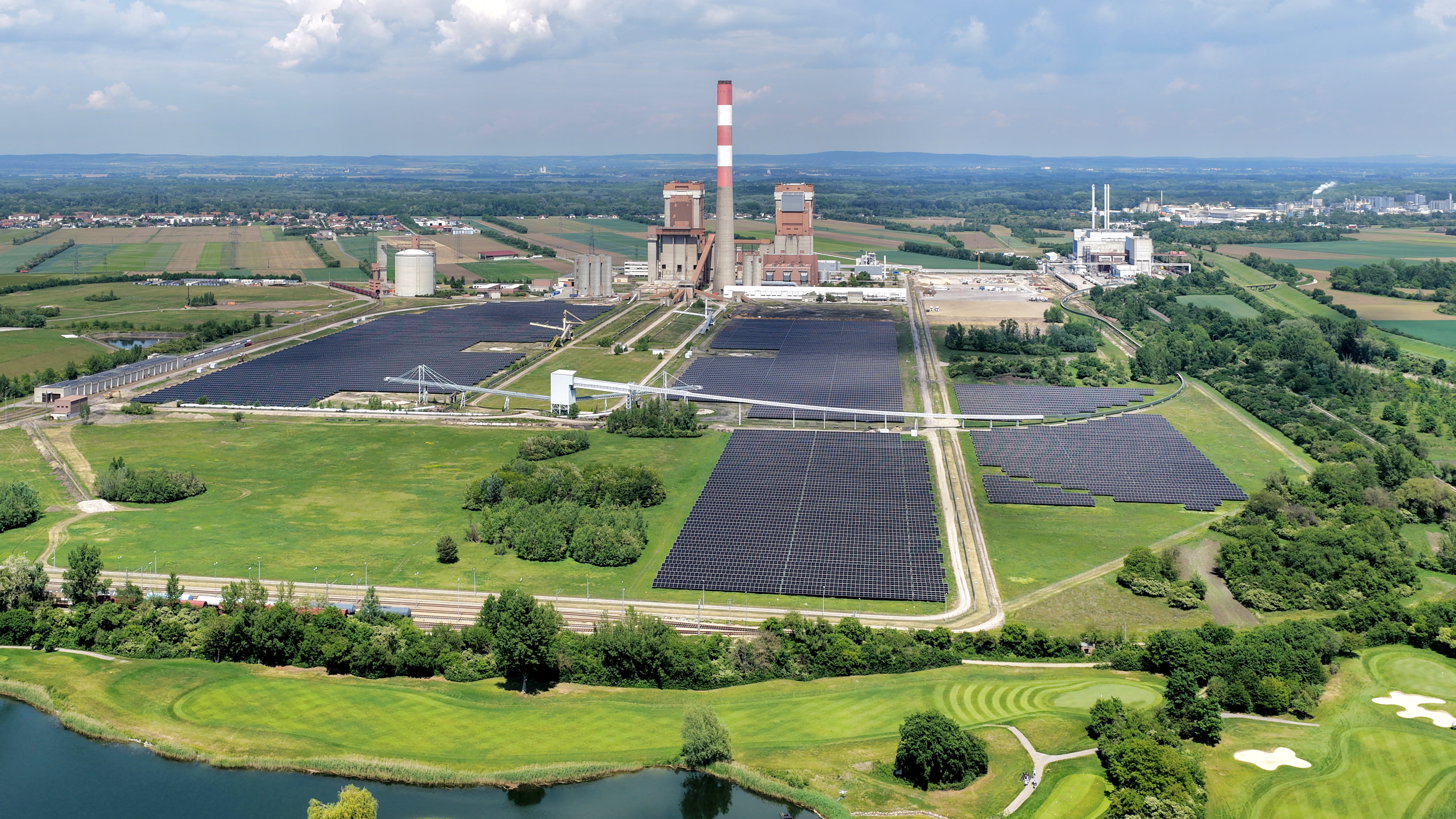
Photovoltaic park; build in 2023

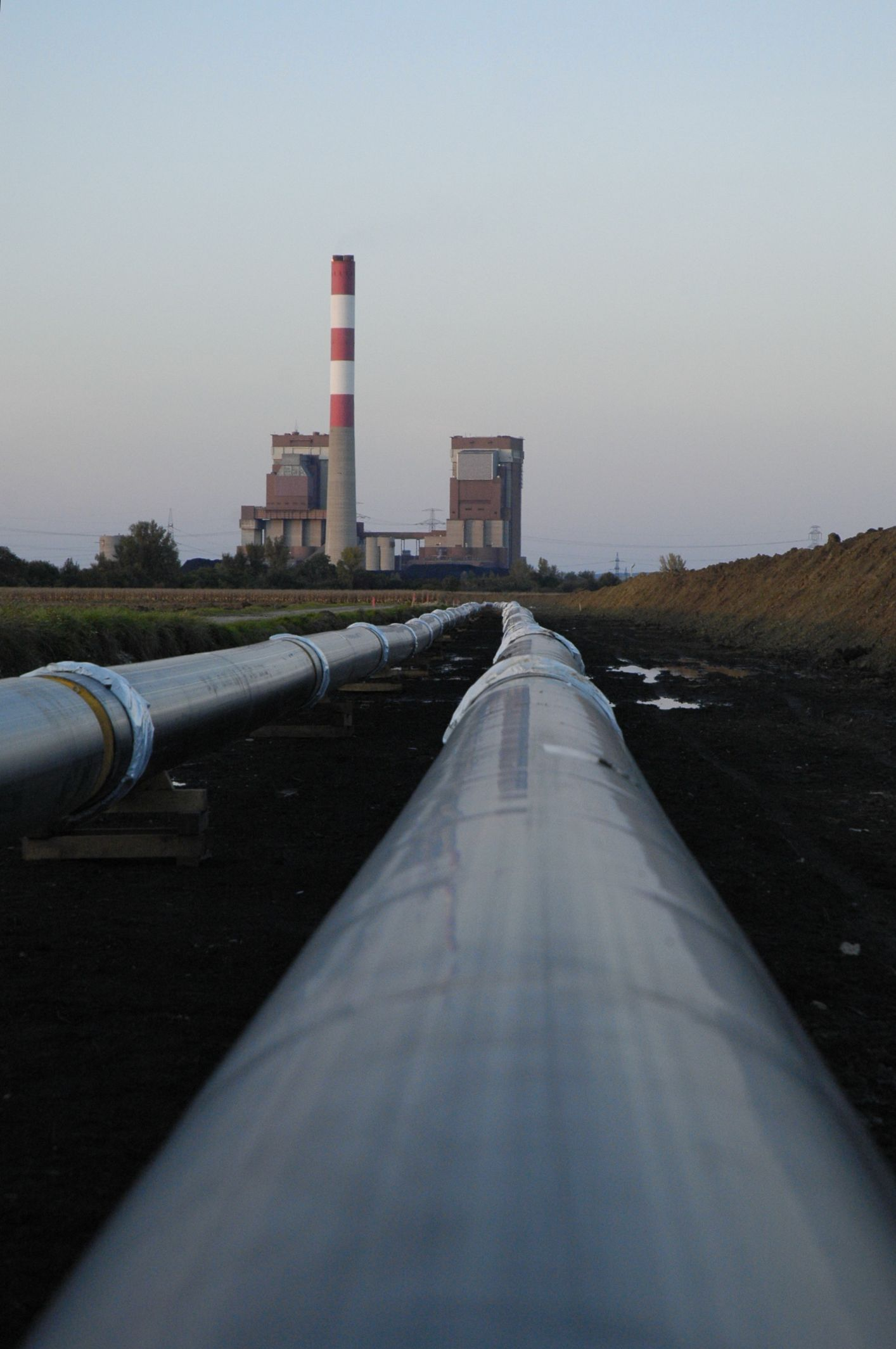
District heating pipeline from the power station Dürnrohr to Sankt Pölten with a length of 31 km

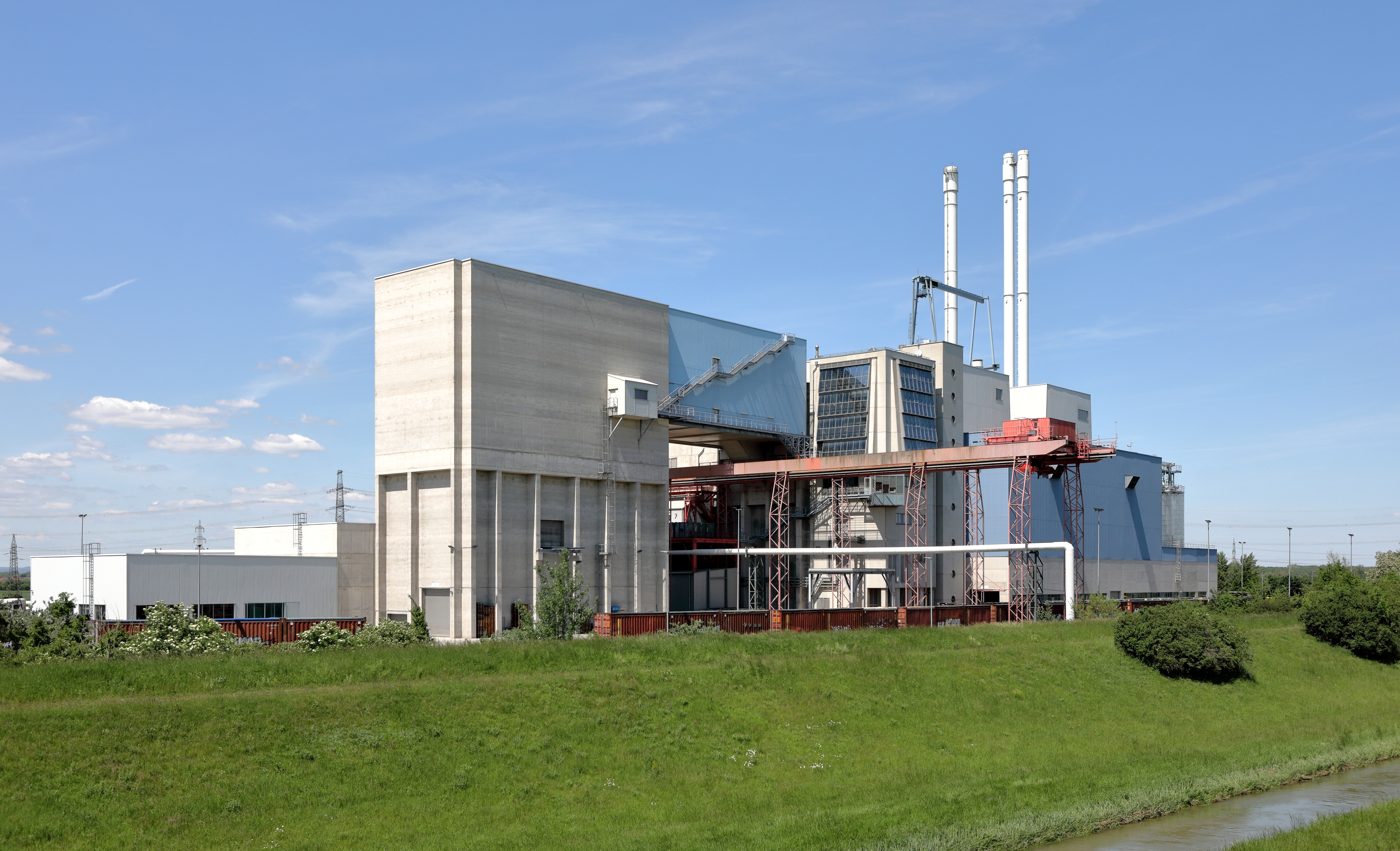
Waste incineration plant Dürnrohr
