= Ragna Debats =

Dutch long-distance runner

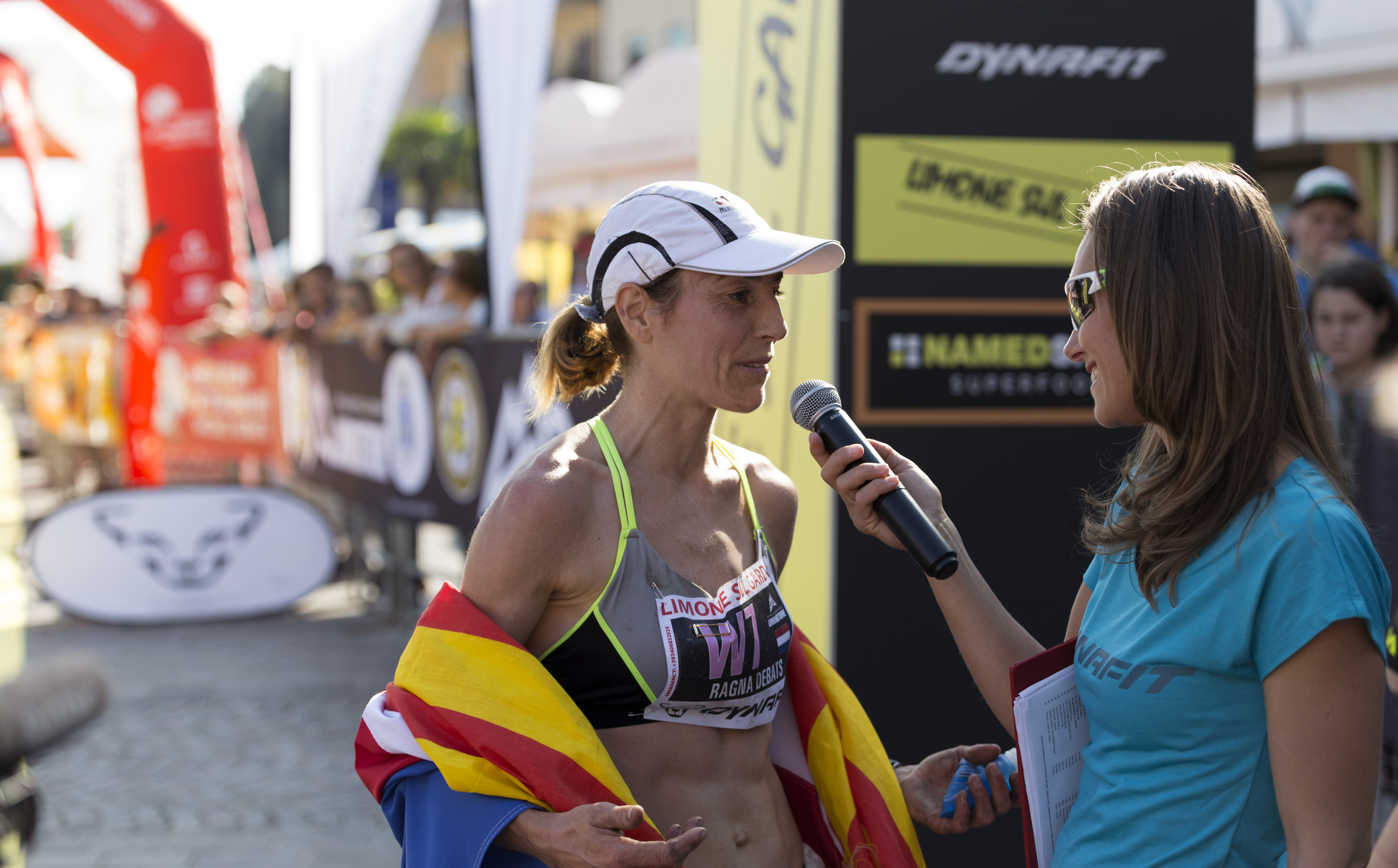
- Ragna Debats after her 3rd place at the 2017 Limone Extreme SkyRace

Personal information
- Full name: Ragna Cathelijne Debats
- Nationality: Dutch
- Born: 22 March 1979 (age 47) Catalonia

Sport
- Country: Netherlands
- Sport: Snowshoe running Trail running Skyrunning
Medal record
Trail running
Gold medal – first place	2019	Marathon des Sables
World Championships
Gold medal – first place	2018 Penyagolosa	Women's overall
Bronze medal – third place	2016 Braga	Women's overall
Skyrunning
European Championships
Gold medal – first place	2017 Val d’Isère	Ultra SkyRace
Snowshoe running
World Championships
Gold medal – first place	2017 Saranac Lake	Women's overall
Silver medal – second place	2016 Vezza d'Oglio	Women's overall

Ragna Debats (born 22 March 1979) is a Spanish-born Dutch female snowshoe runner, trail runner and sky runner. She was European champion in skyrunning (2017) and bronze medal at the world championships in the trail running (2016). In the 34th edition of the Marathon des Sables (2019) she became the first Dutch person to win the race.

== Biography ==
Ragna Debats, in addition to practicing skyrunning, is also a snowshoe running champion. In 2016 she won a silver medal at the 7th edition of the ISSF World Snowshoe Championships.
