= Plug-in electric vehicles in Austria =

As of October 2022, there were 100,000 electric vehicles in Austria, equivalent to 2% of all vehicles in the country. As of 2021, 13.9% of new cars registered in Austria were electric.

As of September 2022, the Tesla Model Y was the best-selling electric car in Austria.

== Government policy ==
As of October 2022, the Austrian government offers subsidies of up to €5,000 for electric car purchases.

== Charging stations ==
As of November 2022, there were around 15,000 public charging stations in Austria.

== By state ==
=== Carinthia ===
As of 2021, 11.8% of new cars registered in Carinthia were electric.

=== Lower Austria ===
As of 2021, there were 20,000 electric vehicles registered in Lower Austria, equivalent to 1.4% of vehicles in the state.

=== Salzburg ===
As of 2021, 17% of new cars registered in Salzburg were electric.

=== Vienna ===
As of 2017, there were 500 public charging stations in Vienna.

=== Vorarlberg ===
As of 2021, 17% of new cars registered in Vorarlberg were electric.
