= Amber Ferreira =

American triathlete

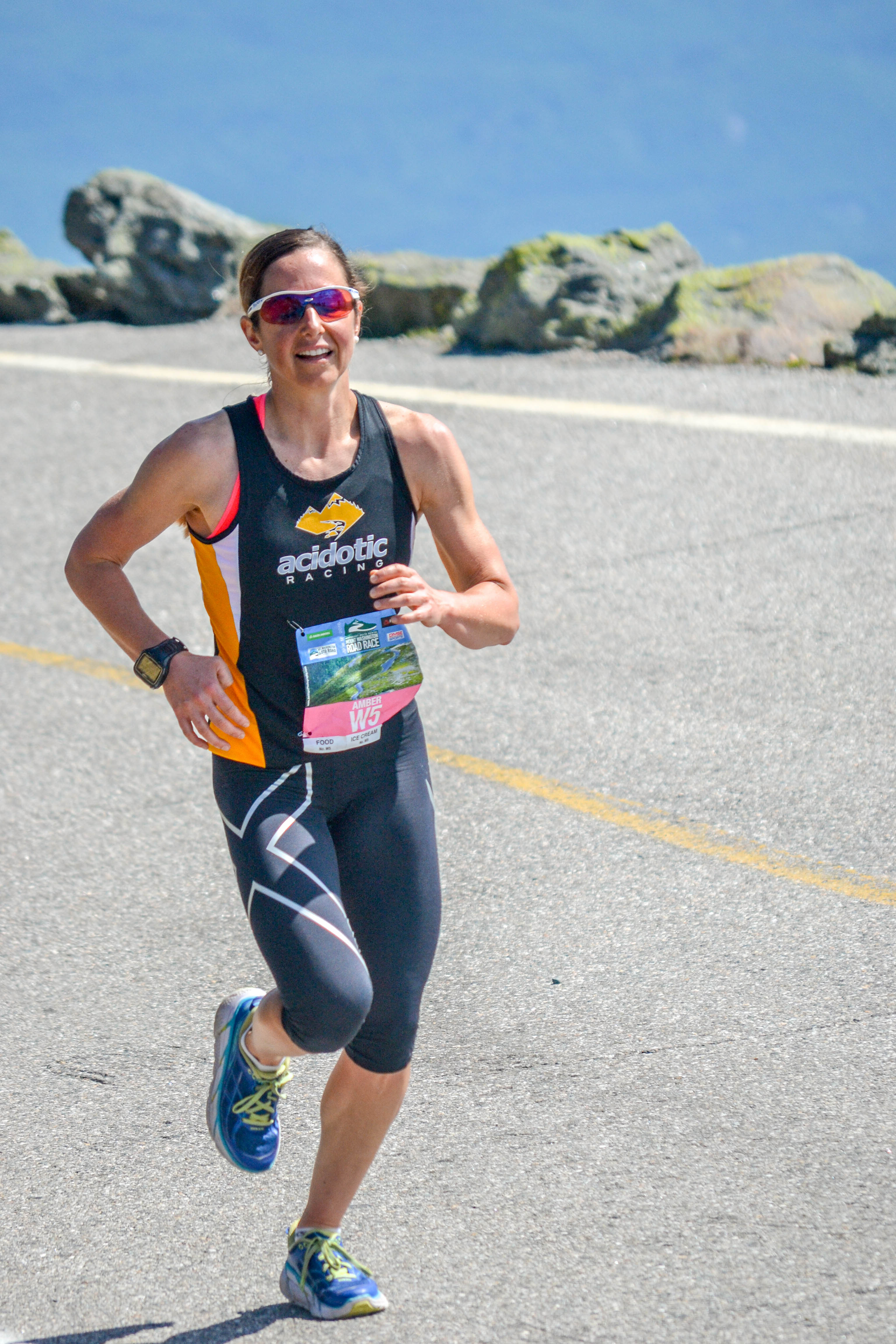
2016 Mt Washington Road Race-92

Amber Ferreira (née Cullen; born 1982) is an American triathlete, coach and endurance athlete. She is the 2010 and 2014 United States Snowshoe Champion and the 2012 World Snowshoe Championship runner-up.

== Athletic career ==
Ferreira was born to Gregory and Gloria Cullen, and grew up in Westford, Massachusetts, where she attended Westford Academy. She was recruited to run track and cross country and attended Northeastern University where she held the 10K school record. After college, she married Danny Ferreira and began branching out from the standard 5 and 10k distances that she had competed in college. She competed in 24-hour road races, endurance cross-country ski races, trail marathons and 10 mile swims. After about three years of trialing various sports, she settled on triathlons and began her career as a professional triathlete. In 2014, she won Ironman Lake Placid and finished 2nd at Ironman Mont Tremblant and Ironman Texas.

In addition to competing at the international level in long-distance triathlons, Ferreira also competes in snowshoe and road running competitions as well as coaches endurance athletes herself.

== Notable results ==
=== Triathlon ===
Event	Year	Place
Ironman Mont Tremblant	2016	4th
Ironman Austria	2016	4th
Ironman Coeur d'Alene	2015	4th
Ironman Lake Placid	2014	1st
Ironman Texas	2014	2nd
Ironman Mont Tremblant	2014	2nd
Timberman 70.3	2013	3rd
Eagleman 70.3	2013	3rd
Mont Tremblant 70.3	2013	4th
New Orleans 70.3	2012	9th
Oceanside 70.3	2012	9th
Mooseman 70.3	2012	4th
Eagleman 70.3	2012	5th
Pumpkinman 70.3	2012	1st
Pocono Mountains 70.3	2012	2nd
Ironman Arizona	2012	11th
Rhode Island 70.3	2011	5th
Ironman Lake Placid	2011	7th
Timberman 70.3	2011	6th
Ironman Lake Placid	2010	2nd Female Amateur
Mooseman 70.3	2010	1st Female Amateur

=== Other results and recognitions ===
- 2016 Killington Stage Race (Pro-3)-2nd
- 2016 Crossan Cup Winner
- 2015 Laugavegur Ultra Marathon - 1st
- 2014 US Snowshoe Champion
- 2012 World Snowshoe Championships - 2nd
- 2011 Mount Washington Road Race - 10th
- 2010 US Snowshoe Champion
- 2010 Granite State Snowshoe Series - 1st
- 2010 Mount Washington Road Race - 7th
- 2010 US Snowshoe Champion
- 2010 and 2009 NH Triathlete of the Year
- 2010 and 2009 USAT All-American
- 2010 Crossan Cup Winner
- 2009 Lord of the Flies Triathlon challenge - 1st
- 2009 Bull Moose Champion
- 2008 New Hampshire Best of the U.S. Amateur Triathlon
- 2009 New Orleans Mardi Gras Marathon - 9th Place
