= Vezza d'Oglio =

Vezza d'Oglio Èsa (Lombard)
- Comune
- Comune di Vezza d'Oglio
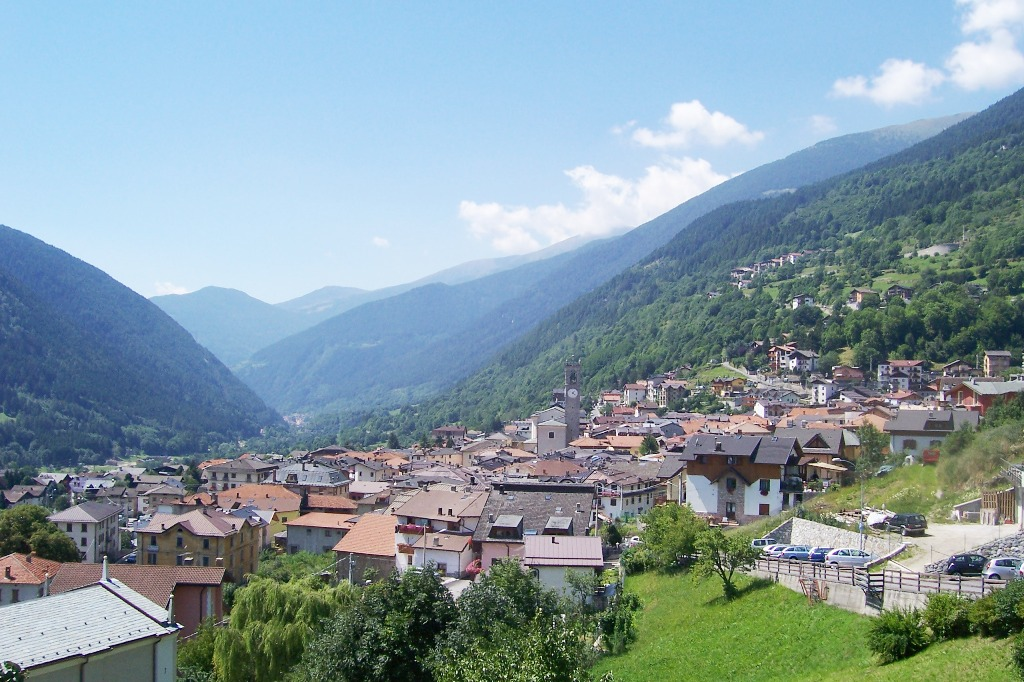
- Vezza d'Oglio

- Location within Italy Location within Lombardy
- Coordinates: 46°14′20″N 10°23′53″E
- Country: Italy
- Region: Lombardy
- Province: Brescia (BS)
- Frazioni: Davena, Grano, Tù

Government
  - Mayor: Giovanmaria Rizzi

Area
  - Total: 54.15 km^{2} (20.91 sq mi)
- Elevation: 1,080 m (3,540 ft)

Population (January 1st 2022)https://demo.istat.it/bilmens/index02.php?anno=2021&lingua=ita
  - Total: 1,474
  - Density: 27.22/km^{2} (70.50/sq mi)
- Demonym: Vezzesi
- Time zone: UTC+1 (CET)
  - Summer (DST): UTC+2 (CEST)
- Postal code: 25059
- Dialing code: 0364
- ISTAT code: 017198
- Patron saint: San Martino di Tours
- Saint day: 11 November
- Website: Official website

Vezza d'Oglio (Camunian: Èsa) is a comune in the province of Brescia, in Lombardy, northern Italy. It is located in the upper Camonica Valley.

== Origins of the name ==
Legend has it that a flood destroyed the ancient town of Rosolina, on the detritus of which the current Vezza was born. Èsa means "barrel", and it was this object that was found in the place of the natural disaster; a barrel full of oil which gave rise to the name. The dialect translation of the name (Éza) means barrel.

== Religion ==
=== Churches ===
- San Clemente (1585)

== Twin towns ==
- (France) Flayosc since 2002
