= Dachstein glacier =

Glacier above Ramsau am Dachstein, Austria

Dachstein Glacier
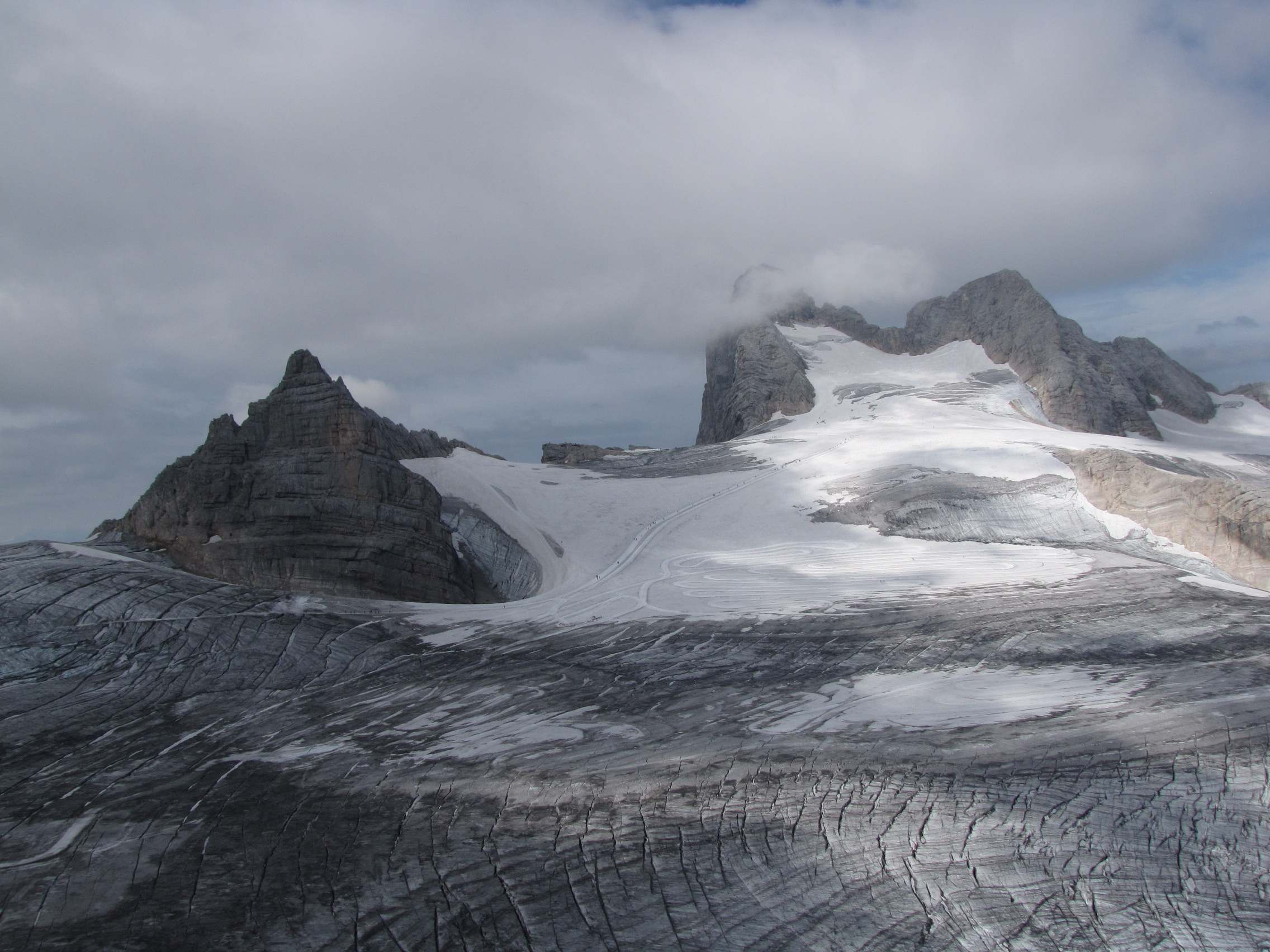
- Hoher Dachstein (2,996 metres (9,829 ft)) with Dachstein Glacier in summer, viewed from NE

- Location within Austria Location within Alps
- Interactive map of Dachstein Glacier
- Location: Ramsau am Dachstein and Obertraun, Austria
- Coordinates: 47°28′48″N 13°36′58″E

Dachstein Glacier ski area
- Interactive map of Dachstein Glacier ski area
- Nearest city: Salzburg
- Top elevation: 2,700 metres (8,900 ft)
- Base elevation: 2,057 metres (6,749 ft)
- Lift system: 5 total (1 Cable Car, 1 Double Seat chairlift, 3 Tow Lifts)
- Terrain parks: 1, Atomic Superpark
- Website: http://www.planai.at/dachstein/

Dachstein Glacier is a glacier located between the towns of Ramsau am Dachstein in the south and Hallstatt and Obertraun in the north, in Austria. Snow is at the top of the glacier throughout the year. However snow is soft in summer. This mountain is located at the borders of Salzburg, Upper Austria and Styria. The train stops at Schladming and from there is a bus to the village below the Dachstein Mountains.

== Skiing ==
The Dachstein used to be a popular ski area that remains snow-covered for much of the year. Descents are between 2,700 m and 2,264 m, it has three drag lifts and one two-seater chairlift (all on the eastern part of the glacier, called Schladminger Gletscher, in the municipality of Obertraun), as well as the cable car from Ramsau to take people up to the glacier. Skiing has been suspended indefinitely after extremely hot summer of 2022, that brought not only high temperatures, but also big amounts of rain and Sahara sand that injured glacier and made it unsafe to ski on.

== Gallery ==
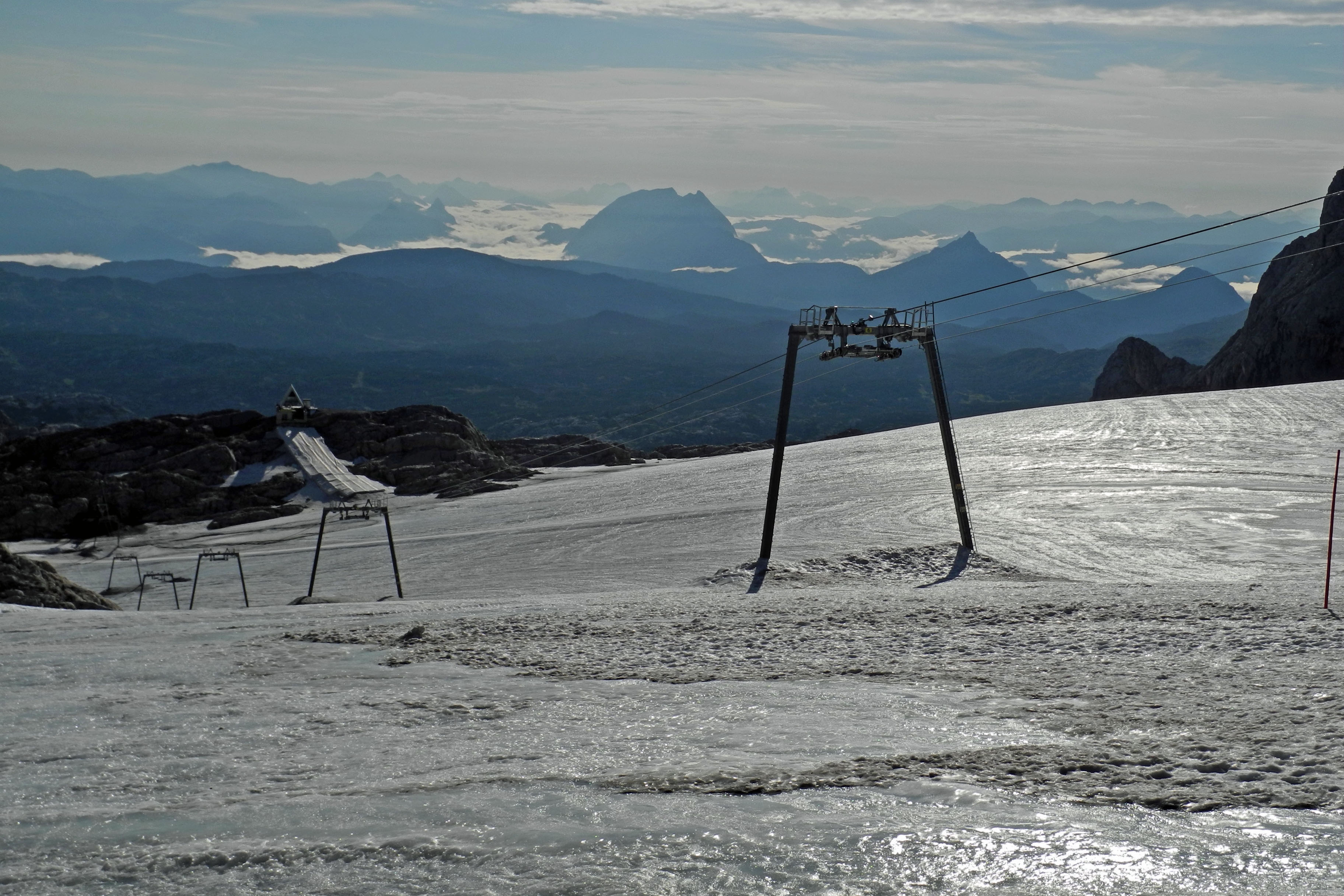
Schladminger Gletscher in summer, view to east

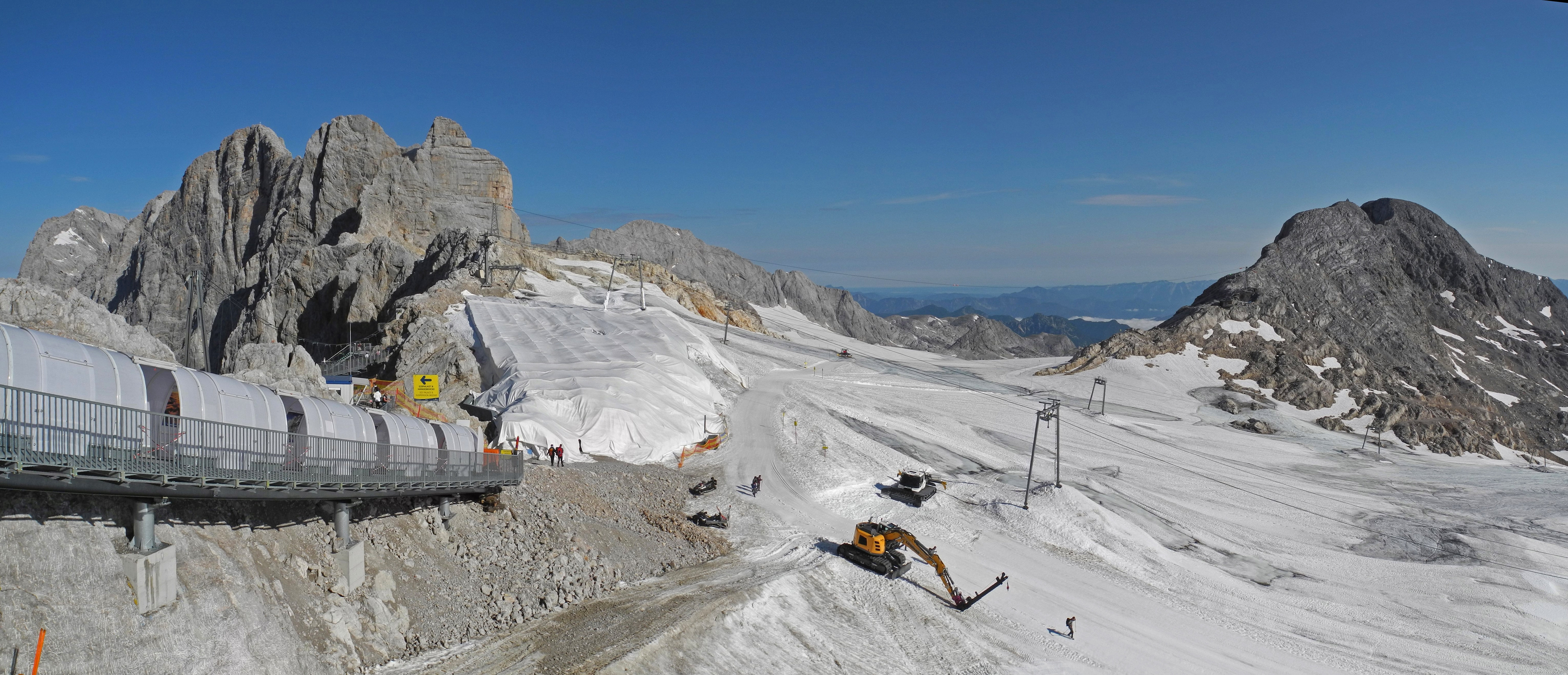
Schladminger Gletscher in summer, view to north-west

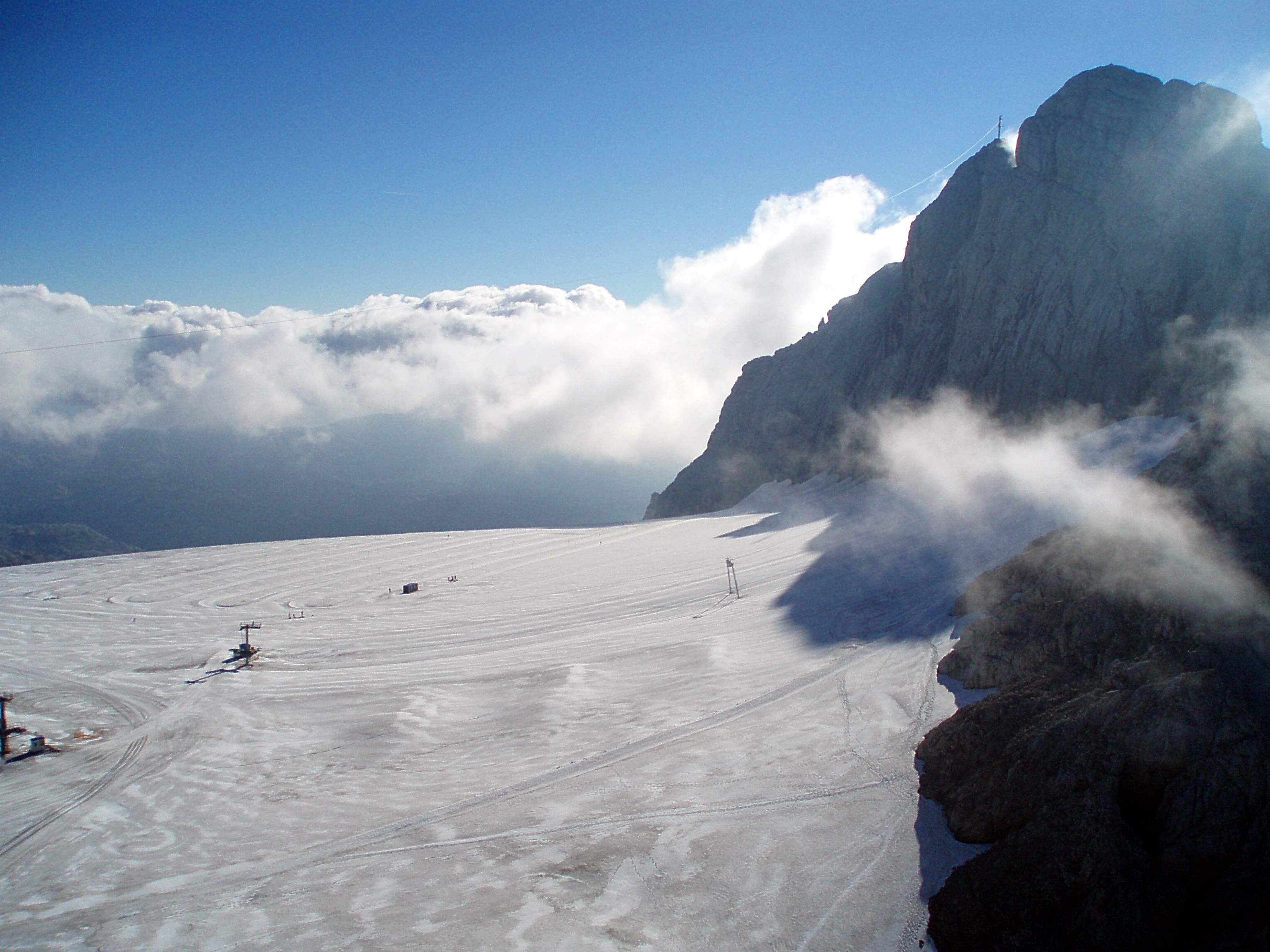
Schladminger Gletscher in summer, view to east

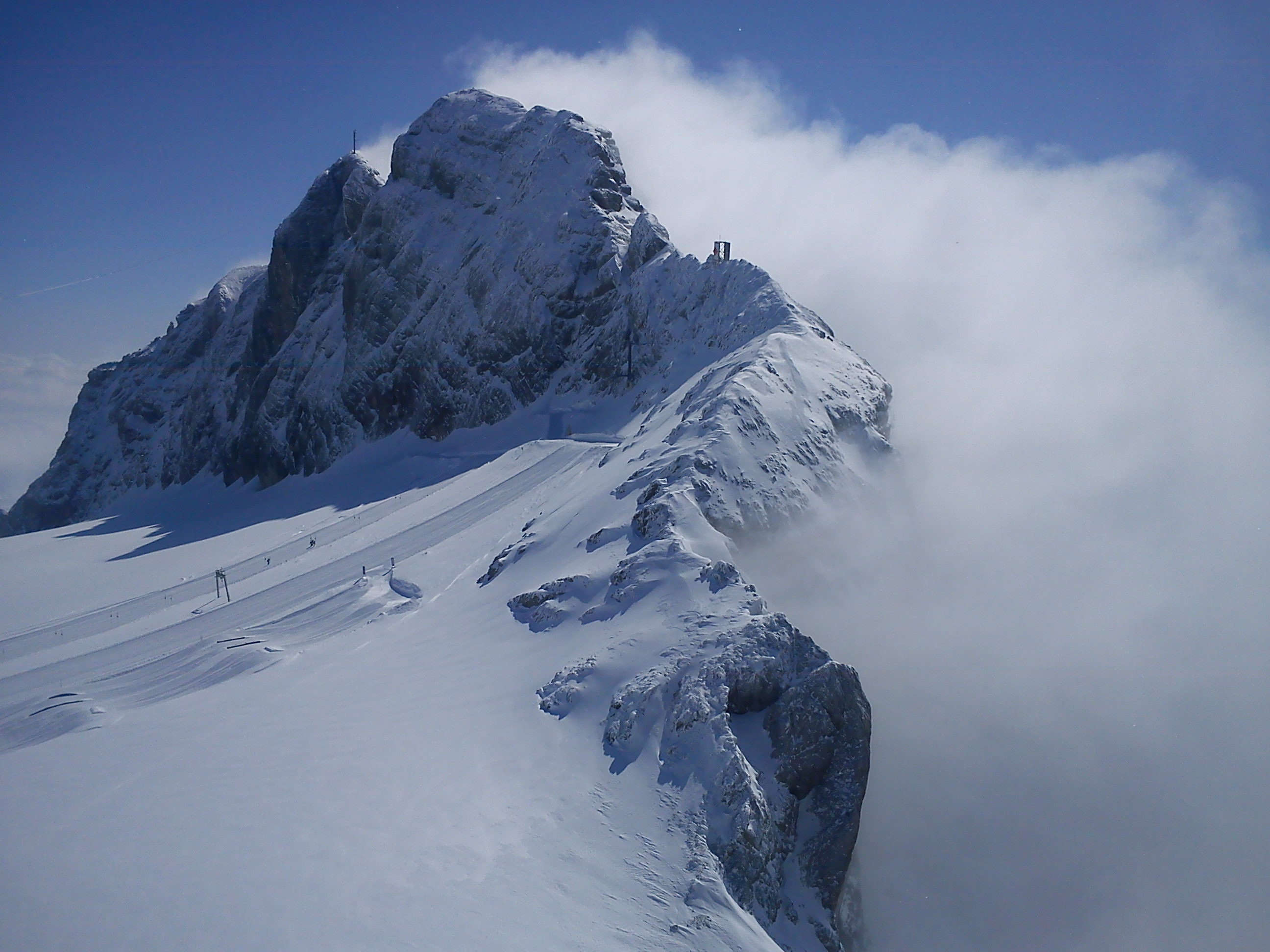
Schladminger Gletscher in winter, view to south-east
