= World Snowshoe Federation =

International sports governing body

- Abbreviation: WSSF
- Founded: 2010
- Founder: Monika Owczarek, Oscar Sebrango, Andrew Snook and Andrew Dunn
- Dissolved: 2026
- Type: Federation of sport associations
- Headquarters: Canada
- Region served: Worldwide
- President: (Canada) David Robinson
- Key people: (Canada) David Robinson
- Volunteers: 3
- Website: www.worldsnowshoe.org
- Formerly called: International Snowshoe Federation (ISF)

The World SnowShoe Federation (WSSF), formerly the International Snowshoe Federation (ISF or ISSF), was the world governing body for snowshoe running between 2010 to 2026.

The federation was founded by Monika Owczarek (president), Oscar Sebrango (vice-president), Andrew Snook (secretary) and Andrew Dunn (treasurer). But, they left the federation years later and are no longer involved. David Robinson took over as president and most of the positions at WSSF and became the new owner of WSSF's website which he built.

In 2015, the organization changed its name to the World SnowShoe Federation, so as not to be confused with other existing international federations: ISSF (International Shooting Sport Federation) and ISF (International Skyrunning Federation).

In 2026, World SnowShoe Federation's website was cloned by two ex-board members of the federation who finished their membership in 2025, with all its information stolen. They used this information to set up a new website with an indian domain called worldsnowshoe.in and are telling everyone they are the owners of World SnowShoe Federation, starting by convincing a committee of an established race in Northern Italy to host their World SnowShoe Championships. But, that was illegal because David Robinson was still the real president and owner of WSSF.

The two ex-board members put out an fb notice that their website was the original WSSF website and this made the real World SnowShoe Federation website to shut down. David Robinson said the legal costs to fight back were too high to save World SnowShoe Federation and he decided to leave WSSF and dissolve it with the remaining volunteers.

== World championships ==
The WSSF governed the World Snowshoe Championships, which were hosted annually in different locations around the world. The championships were held every year since 2006, except for 2008, 2009, 2021. After the two ex-board members cloned WSSF's website and stole all its information to call themselves the owners of World SnowShoe Federation and lie an Italian committee of an established race that they were the real WSSF to host their World SnowShoe Championships and David Robinson leaving and dissolving WSSF, the World SnowShoe Championships folded in 2026
