= Snowshoe running =

Winter sport

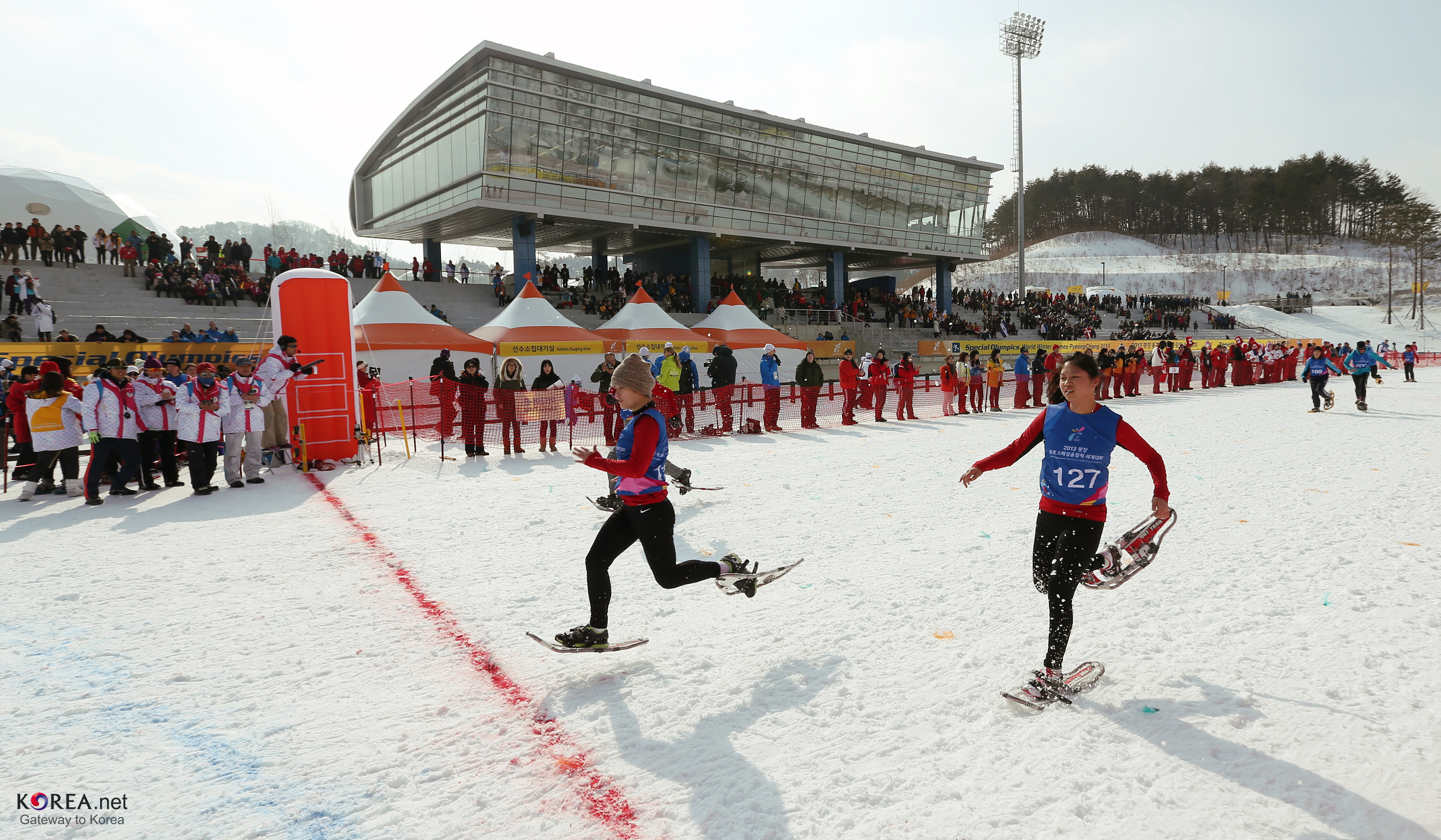
A snowshoe running race.

Snowshoe running, or snowshoeing, is a winter sport practiced with snowshoes, which is governed by World Snowshoe Federation (WSSF) founded in 2010, which until 2015 had its name International Snowshoe Federation (ISSF). The snowshoes running is part of the Special Olympics and Arctic Winter Games programs.

== International federations ==
The World Snowshoe Federation (WSSF) is the global governing body of snowshoe running recognized by the International Olympic Committee.

== World championships ==
WSSF organized the World Snowshoe Championships in 2016 in Vezza d'Oglio, Italy and in 2017 in Saranac Lake, NY from 24 February to 25 February 2017, until the previous edition, the ISSF 2015 World Snowshoe Championships, held in Quebec City, Canada, the championships were organized by the same International federation, but with old name of ISSF.

== See also ==
- They are also used in winter triathlon
- Cross country running
- Mountain running
- Trail running
- Skyrunning
