= Italy at the European Mountain Running Championships =

ITA at the European Mountain Running Championships
- National federation: FIDAL
- Website: www.fidal.it

European Mountain Running Championships appearances
- auto

Italy has participated in all editions of the European Mountain Running Championships, since the first edition of 1994 European Mountain Running Championships.

== Men ==
=== Individual ===
Year	Rank and runner	Team
Edition 1 (France); 1995 Vallerague	2. Antonio Molinari (silver); 3. Davide Milesi (bronze); 4. Lucio Fregona; 6. Galdino Pilot	Gold
Edition 2 (Wales); 1996 Llanberis	3. Lucio Fregona (bronze); 4. Danilo Bosio; 12. Gino Caveva; 13. Massimo Galliano	Silver
Edition 3 (Austria); 1997 Ebensee	2. Antonio Molinari (silver); 6. Marco De Gasperi; 9. Karl Gruber; 11. Lucio Fregona	Gold
Edition 4 (Italy); 1998 Sestriere	1. Antonio Molinari (gold); 3. Marco De Gasperi (bronze); 5. Lucio Fregona; 18. Roberto Porro	Gold
Edition 5 (Austria); 1999 Bad Kleinkirchheim	1. Antonio Molinari (gold); 5. Simone Lenzi; 15. Davide Milesi; 16. Marco De Gasperi	Gold
Edition 6 (Poland); 2000 Miedzyggorze	1. Massimo Galliano (gold); 3. Antonio Molinari (bronze); 12. Andrea Agostini; 18. Roberto Porro	Gold
Edition 7 (Slovenia); 2001 Cerklje	1. Antonio Molinari (gold); 7. Marco De Gasperi; 8. Marco Gaiardo; 9. Emanuele Manzi	Gold
Edition 8 (Portugal); 2002 Camara de Lobos	2. Marco De Gasperi (silver); 4. Emanuele Manzi; 5. Marco Gaiardo; 10. Lucio Fregona	Gold
Edition 9 (Italy); 2003 Trento	1. Marco Gaiardo (gold); 4. Marco De Gasperi; 14. Emanuele Manzi; 33. Andrea Agostini	Gold
Edition 10 (Poland); 2004 Korbielow	1. Marco De Gasperi (gold); 3. Marco Gaiardo (bronze); 6. Alessio Rinaldi; 10. Davide Chicco	Gold
Year	Rank and runner	Team
Edition 11 (Austria); 2005 Heiligenblut	3. Marco De Gasperi (bronze); 7. Marco Gaiardo; 10. Gabriele Abate; 25. Davide Chicco	Gold
Edition 12 (Czech Republic); 2006 Male Svatonovice	1. Marco Gaiardo (gold); 5. Gabriele Abate; 13. Alberto Mosca; 24. Diego Filippi	Gold
Edition 13 (France); 2007 Cauterets	2. Marco De Gasperi (silver); 3. Marco Gaiardo (bronze); 10. Gabriele Abate; 16. Mauro Lanfranchi	Gold
Edition 14 (Germany); 2008 Zell am Harmersbach	2. Bernard Dematteis (silver); 3. Marco De Gasperi (bronze); 6. Marco Gaiardo; 7. Gabriele Abate	Gold
Edition 15 (Austria); 2009 Telfes	2. Marco De Gasperi (silver); 6. Martin Dematteis; 9. Riccardo Sterni; 20. Bernard Dematteis	Gold
Edition 16 (Bulgaria); 2010 Sapareva Banya	2. Martin Dematteis (silver); 3. Marco De Gasperi (bronze); 5. Gabriele Abate; 6. Bernard Dematteis	Gold
Edition 17 (Turkey); 2011 Bursa Uludag	2. Gabriele Abate (silver); 3. Bernard Dematteis (bronze); 5. Alex Baldaccini; 23. Martin Dematteis	Gold
Edition 18 (Turkey); 2012 Denizli Pamukkale	4. Gabriele Abate; 5. Marco De Gasperi; 7. Xavier Chevrier; 23. Bernard Dematteis	Gold
Edition 19 (Bulgaria); 2013 Borovets	1. Bernard Dematteis (gold); 2. Alex Baldaccini (silver); 4. Xavier Chevrier; 23. Martin Dematteis	Gold
Edition 20 (France); 2014 Gap	1. Bernard Dematteis (gold); 3. Martin Dematteis (bronze); 7. Luca Cagnati; 20. Alex Baldaccini	Gold
Year	Rank and runner	Team
Edition 21 (Portugal); 2015 Porto Moniz	3. Alex Baldaccini (bronze); 6. Xavier Chevrier; 7. Bernard Dematteis; 13. Luca Cagnati	Gold
Edition 22 (Italy); 2016 Arco	1. Martin Dematteis (gold); 2. Bernard Dematteis (silver); 5. Cesare Maestri; 7. Xavier Chevrier	Gold
Edition 23 (Slovenia); 2017 Kamnik	1. Xavier Chevrier (gold); 3. Francesco Puppi (bronze); 13. Alex Baldaccini; 18. Cesare Maestri	Silver
Edition 24 (North Macedonia); 2018 Skopje	1. Bernard Dematteis (gold); 2. Cesare Maestri (silver); 3. Martin Dematteis (bronze); 8. Francesco Puppi	Gold
Edition 25 (Switzerland); 2019 Zermatt	3. Xavier Chevrier (bronze); 5. Cesare Maestri; 10. Alex Baldaccini; 47. Nadir Cavagna	Silver

=== Medal table individual ===
Runner	Individual				Team				Total			
Runner	1st place, gold medalist(s)	2nd place, silver medalist(s)	3rd place, bronze medalist(s)	Tot	1st place, gold medalist(s)	2nd place, silver medalist(s)	3rd place, bronze medalist(s)	Tot	1st place, gold medalist(s)	2nd place, silver medalist(s)	3rd place, bronze medalist(s)	Tot
Bernard Dematteis	3	2	1	6	11	0	0	11	14	2	1	17
Antonio Molinari	3	2	1	6	6	0	0	6	9	2	1	12
Marco Gaiardo	2	0	2	4	8	0	0	8	10	0	2	12
Marco De Gasperi	1	3	4	8	13	0	0	13	14	3	4	21
Martin Dematteis	1	1	2	4	7	0	0	7	8	1	2	12
Massimo Galliano	1	0	0	1	1	1	0	2	2	1	0	3
Xavier Chevrier	1	0	1	2	4	2	0	6	5	2	1	8
Alex Baldaccini	0	1	1	2	4	2	0	6	4	3	1	8
Casre Maestri	0	1	0	1	2	2	0	4	2	3	0	5
Gabriele Abate	0	1	0	1	7	0	0	7	7	1	0	8
Lucio Fregona	0	0	1	1	4	1	0	5	4	1	1	6
Davide Milesi	0	0	1	1	2	0	0	2	2	0	1	3
Francesco Puppi	0	0	1	1	1	1	0	2	1	1	1	3

=== Medal table team ===
Team	Gold	Silver	Bronze	Total
Italy	21	2	0	23

== Women ==
=== Individual ===
Year	Rank and runner	Team
Edition 1 (France); 1995 Vallerague	6. Nives Curti; 8. Valeria Colpo; 11. Daniela Spilotti	Bronze
Edition 2 (Wales); 1996 Llanberis	2. Maria Grazia Roberti (silver); 3. Nives Curti (bronze); 5. Mirela Cabodi	Gold
Edition 3 (Austria); 1997 Ebensee	10. Flavia Gaviglio; 12. Maria Grazia Roberti; 25. Nives Curti	5. (Italy) ITA
Edition 4 (Italy); 1998 Sestriere	1. Rosita Rota Gelpi (gold); 2. Flavia Gaviglio (silver); 3. Pierangela Baronchelli (bronze); 4. Maria Grazia Roberti	Gold
Edition 5 (Austria); 1999 Bad Kleinkirchheim	8. Maria Grazia Roberti; 16. Daniela Spilotti; 18. Flavia Gaviglio; 39. Rosita Rota Gelpi	Bronze
Edition 6 (Poland); 2000 Miedzyggorze	3. Rosita Rota Gelpi (bronze); 6. Flavia Gaviglio; 10. Margherita Grosso; 17. Pierangela Baronchelli	Gold
Edition 7 (Slovenia); 2001 Cerklje	4. Pierangela Baronchelli; 17. Flavia Gaviglio; 24. Asha Tonolini; 41. Rosita Rota Gelpi	Bronze
Edition 8 (Portugal); 2002 Camara de Lobos	6. Valentina Belotti; 7. Romina Sedoni; 9. Vittoria Salvini; 14. Asha Tonolini	Gold
Edition 9 (Italy); 2003 Trento	3. Antonella Confortola (bronze); 7. Vittoria Salvini; 9. Monica Bottinelli; 14. Flavia Gaviglio	Gold
Edition 10 (Poland); 2004 Korbielow	3. Rosita Rota Gelpi (bronze); 7. Antonella Confortola; 8. Flavia Gaviglio; 18. Elena Riva	Gold
Year	Rank and runner	Team
Edition 11 (Austria); 2005 Heiligenblut	5. Vittoria Salvini; 9. Antonella Confortola; 20. Flavia Gaviglio; 28. Monica Morstofolini	Silver
Edition 12 (Czech Republic); 2006 Male Svatonovice	3. Vittoria Salvini (bronze); 7. Maria Grazia Roberti; 8. Monica Morstofolini; 13. Elisa Desco	Gold
Edition 13 (France); 2007 Cauterets	7. Vittoria Salvini; 10. Maria Grazia Roberti; 12. Elisa Desco; 17. Antonella Confortola	Bronze
Edition 14 (Germany); 2008 Zell am Harmersbach	1. Elisa Desco (gold); 8. Maria Grazia Roberti; 13. Cristina Scolari	Bronze
Edition 15 (Austria); 2009 Telfes	2. Valentina Belotti (silver); 4. Renate Rungger; 10. Maria Grazia Roberti; 25. Cristina Scolari	Gold
Edition 16 (Bulgaria); 2010 Sapareva Banya	2. Valentina Belotti (silver); 4. Antonella Confortola; 6. Cristina Scolari; 11. Maria Grazia Roberti	Gold
Edition 17 (Turkey); 2011 Bursa Uludag	2. Antonella Confortola (silver); 4. Valentina Belotti; 16. Ornella Ferrara; 20. Alice Gaggi	Gold
Edition 18 (Turkey); 2012 Denizli Pamukkale	7. Antonella Confortola; 9. Alice Gaggi; 14. Maura Trotti; 18. Maria Grazia Roberti	Silver
Edition 19 (Bulgaria); 2013 Borovets	2. Valentina Belotti (silver); 4. Elisa Desco; 5. Renate Rungger; 28. Samantha Galassi	Gold
Edition 20 (France); 2014 Gap	4. Alice Gaggi; 7. Elisa Desco; 9. Valentina Belotti; 31. Elisa Sortini	Gold
Year	Rank and runner	Team
Edition 21 (Portugal); 2015 Porto Moniz	10. Alice Gaggi; 15. Samantha Galassi; 19. Antonella Confortola; 28. Sara Bottarelli	4. (Italy) ITA
Edition 22 (Italy); 2016 Arco	2. Alice Gaggi (silver); 3. Sara Bottarelli (bronze); 6. Valentina Belotti; 12. Antonella Confortola	Gold
Edition 23 (Slovenia); 2017 Kamnik	6. Valentina Belotti; 11. Sara Bottarelli; 16. Alice Gaggi; 26. Samantha Galassi	Silver
Edition 24 (North Macedonia); 2018 Skopje	9. Alice Gaggi; 15. Emma Quaglia; 19. Gloria Giudici; 25. Samantha Galassi	4th
Edition 25 (Switzerland); 2019 Zermatt	5. Elisa Sortini; 7. Valentina Belotti; 10. Alessia Scaini; 26. Erica Ghelfi	Silver

=== Medal table individual ===
Runner	Individual				Team				Total			
Runner	1st place, gold medalist(s)	2nd place, silver medalist(s)	3rd place, bronze medalist(s)	Tot	1st place, gold medalist(s)	2nd place, silver medalist(s)	3rd place, bronze medalist(s)	Tot	1st place, gold medalist(s)	2nd place, silver medalist(s)	3rd place, bronze medalist(s)	Tot
Rosita Rota Gelpi	1	0	2	3	3	0	2	5	4	0	4	8
Elisa Desco	1	0	0	1	3	0	2	5	4	0	2	6
Valentina Belotti	0	3	0	3	7	2	0	9	7	5	0	12
Antonella Confortola	0	1	1	2	5	2	1	8	5	3	2	10
Maria Grazia Roberti	0	1	0	1	5	1	3	9	5	2	3	10
Flavia Gaviglio	0	1	0	1	4	1	2	7	4	2	2	8
Alice Gaggi	0	1	0	1	3	2	0	5	3	3	0	6
Vittoria Salvini	0	0	1	1	3	1	1	5	3	1	2	6
Pierangela Baronchelli	0	0	1	1	2	0	1	3	2	0	2	4
Sara Bottarelli	0	0	1	1	1	1	0	2	1	1	1	3
Nives Curti	0	0	1	1	1	0	1	2	1	0	2	3

=== Medal table team ===
Team	Gold	Silver	Bronze	Total
Italy	13	3	5	21
