= 2008 World Mountain Running Trophy =

- Organisers: WMRA
- Edition: 24th
- Dates: 14 September
- Host city: Crans-Montana, Switzerland
- Level: Senior and Junior
- Events: 8

The 2008 World Mountain Running Championships was the 24th edition of the global mountain running competition, World Mountain Running Championships, organised by the World Mountain Running Association.

== Results ==
=== Men Senior ===
Distance 12 km, difference in height 930 m, participants 157.

Individual

| Rank | Runner | Country | Time |
|---|---|---|---|
| 1st place, gold medalist(s) | Jonathan Wyatt | New Zealand | 55:04 |
| 2nd place, silver medalist(s) | Martin Toroitich | Uganda | 55:16 |
| 3rd place, bronze medalist(s) | Ahmet Arslan | Turkey | 55:26 |
| 4 | Bernard Dematteis | Italy | 55:48 |
| 5 | Raymond Fontaine | France | 55:52 |
| 6 | John Jairo Vargas E. | Colombia | 56:30 |
| 7 | Timo Zeiler | Germany | 56:43 |
| 8 | Marco De Gasperi | Italy | 56:50 |
| 9 | Andrey Safronov | Russia | 56:53 |
| 10 | David Schneider | Switzerland | 56:54 |

Team

| Rank | Team | Athletes | Points |
|---|---|---|---|
| 1st place, gold medalist(s) | Italy | Bernard Dematteis, Marco De Gasperi, Marco Gaiardo, Gabriele Abate, Hannes Rungger, Emanuele Manzi | 43 |
| 2nd place, silver medalist(s) | Switzerland | David Schneider, Alexis Gex-Fabry, Sabastien Epiney, Tarcis Ancay, Stephan Wenk, Martin Anthamatten | 59 |
| 3rd place, bronze medalist(s) | United States | Rickey Gates, Joe Gray, Eric Blake, Simon Gutierrez, Matt Byrne, Zac Freudenberg | 76 |

=== Women Senior ===
Distance 8.3 km, difference in height 690 m, participants 95.

Individual

| Rank | Runner | Country | Time |
|---|---|---|---|
| 1st place, gold medalist(s) | Andrea Mayr | Austria | 39:40 |
| 2nd place, silver medalist(s) | Renate Rungger | Italy | 41:42 |
| 3rd place, bronze medalist(s) | Elisa Desco | Italy | 41:59 |
| 4 | Kirsten Otterbu M. | Norway | 42:39 |
| 5 | Martina Strähl | Switzerland | 42:47 |
| 6 | Anita Evertsen-Haak | Norway | 42:56 |
| 7 | Paula Claudia Tudoran | Romania | 43:21 |
| 8 | Bernadette Meier | Switzerland | 43:38 |
| 9 | Constance Devillers | France | 43:46 |
| 10 | Anna Frost | New Zealand | 44:10 |

Team

| Rank | Team | Athletes | Points |
|---|---|---|---|
| 1st place, gold medalist(s) | Norway | M. Kirsten Otterbu, Anita Haakenstad-Evertsen, Ingunn Weltzien | 24 |
| 2nd place, silver medalist(s) | Switzerland | Martina Straehl, Barnadette Meier, Angeline Flückiger-Joly, Daniela Gassmann | 25 |
| 3rd place, bronze medalist(s) | Italy | Renate Rungger, Elisa Desco, Maria Grazia Roberti, Vittoria Salvini | 33 |

=== Junior Men ===
Distance 8.3 km, difference in height 690 m, participants 74.

Individual

| Rank | Runner | Country | Time |
|---|---|---|---|
| 1st place, gold medalist(s) | Sindre Buraas | Norway | 42:12 |
| 2nd place, silver medalist(s) | Riccardo Sterni | Italy | 42:25 |
| 3rd place, bronze medalist(s) | Mevlut Savaser | Turkey | 42:43 |
| 4 | Alper Demir | Turkey | 42:51 |
| 5 | Tim Smith | United States | 43:02 |
| 6 | Emrah Akalin | Turkey | 43:06 |
| 7 | Dewi Griffiths | Wales | 43:07 |
| 8 | Akif Kitir | Turkey | 43:21 |
| 9 | Lars Bakke | Norway | 43:30 |
| 10 | Joel Dyrhovden | Norway | 43:31 |

Team

| Rank | Team | Athletes | Points |
|---|---|---|---|
| 1st place, gold medalist(s) | Turkey | Mevlut Savaser, Alper Demir, Emrah Akalin, Akif Kitir | 13 |
| 2nd place, silver medalist(s) | Norway | Sindre Buraas, Lars Bakke, Joel Dyrhovden, Sjur Prestsaether | 20 |
| 3rd place, bronze medalist(s) | Italy | Riccardo Sterni, Xavier Chevrier, Emanuelle Rampa, Luca Re | 35 |

=== Junior Women ===
Distance 4.3 km, difference in height 350 m, participants 48.

Individual

| Rank | Runner | Country | Time |
|---|---|---|---|
| 1st place, gold medalist(s) | Laura Park | England | 22:34 |
| 2nd place, silver medalist(s) | Esra Gullu | Turkey | 23:07 |
| 3rd place, bronze medalist(s) | Alex Dunne | United States | 23:33 |
| 4 | Victoria Kreuzer | Switzerland | 23:55 |
| 5 | Gina Paletta | Wales | 24:04 |
| 6 | Veronica Wallington | Australia | 24:25 |
| 7 | Heather Timmins | England | 24:28 |
| 8 | Katerina Berouskova | Czech Republic | 24:31 |
| 9 | Yagmur Tarhan | Turkey | 24:40 |
| 10 | Beata Wojciechowska | Poland | 24:53 |

Team

| Rank | Team | Athletes | Points |
|---|---|---|---|
| 1st place, gold medalist(s) | England | Laura Park, Heather Timmins, Hannah Bateson | 8 |
| 2nd place, silver medalist(s) | Turkey | Esra Gullu, Yagmur Tarhan, Mavlude Ulu | 11 |
| 3rd place, bronze medalist(s) | Switzerland | Victoria Kreuzer, Lucy Pichard, Marie Luisier | 22 |
