= 2012 World Mountain Running Championships =

- Organisers: WMRA
- Edition: 28th
- Date: 2 September
- Host city: Ponte di Legno, Italy
- Events: 4
- Distances: 14.1 km +1150 m – Men; 8.8 km +760 m – Women; 8.8 km +760 m – Junior men 3.9 km +310 m – Junior women
- Participation: 343 finishers athletes from 40 nations

The 2012 World Mountain Running Championships were held on 2 September in Val Camonica in the Italian Alps. The course ran from Temù - Ponte di Legno to Tonale Pass. It was the 28th edition of the championships, organised by the World Mountain Running Association (WMRA), and the seventh time that Italy had hosted the competition. The competition featured four races, with senior and junior (under-19) races for both men and women. A total of 343 runners from a record high of 40 nations finished the competition.

All the races for the 2012 edition of the championships were uphill. The men's course was 14.1 km long with an incline of 1150 m. The women's and junior men's course had a distance of 8.8 km with an ascent of 760 m. The junior women's race was 3.9 km in length with a climb of 310 m. Each of the races had an individual and team race element.

Eleven nations reached the medal table, with Turkey, Eritrea and Uganda each taking two gold medals. Turkey won the most medals overall (five) and the host nation Italy had the next most with three silvers and one bronze. Mamo Petro won the senior men's race and also headed Eritrea to the team title. The 2010 world champion Andrea Mayr took the women's senior race, which saw the United States claim the team gold. Michael Cherop of Uganda and Sevilay Eytemis of Turkey were the junior champions and also led their nations to their respective team titles.

The candidature of the region to host the event was accepted in September 2011. WMRA Council member Raimondo Balicco suggested the idea and Innocente Agostini, father of 1989 world junior champion Andrea Agostini, acted as organising director for the championships. The venue had previously hosted Italian national championships in mountain running. Franco Arese, the head of the Italian athletics federation (FIDAL), was in attendance. The competition was broadcast on television locally.

The 28th WMRA Congress was also held at the location of the championships. An open race for male and female members of the public held on the same day of the championships attracted 66 runners.

== Results ==
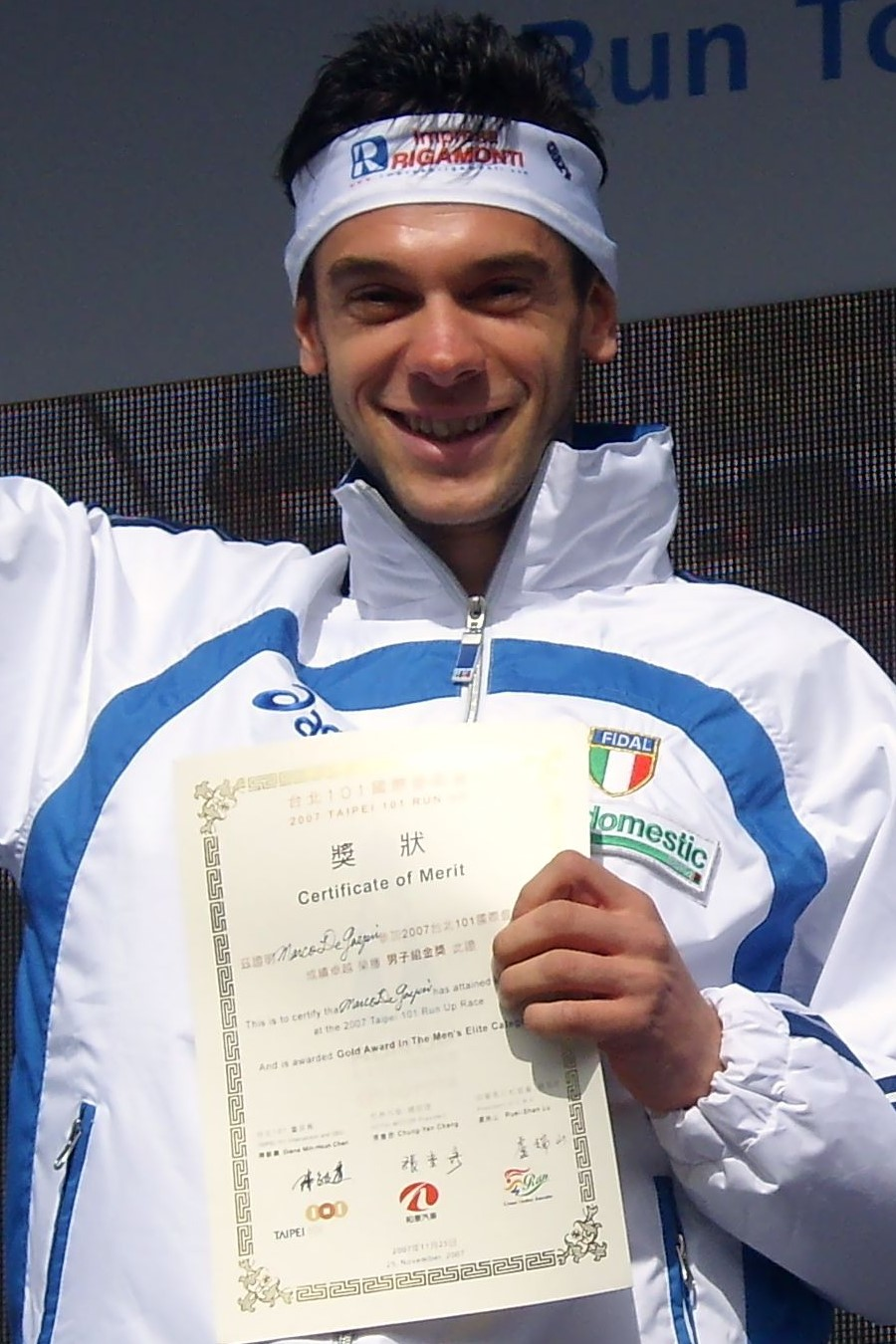
Former world champion Marco De Gasperi was among the competitors in the men's race.

Individual race
Rank	Athlete	Country	Time (m:s)
Gold medal	Mamo Petro	Eritrea	1:01:34
Silver medal	Azeria Teklay	Eritrea	1:02:47
Bronze medal	Andrey Safronov	Russia	1:03:06
4	Debesay Tsige	Eritrea	1:04:04
5	Gabriele Abate	Italy	1:04:53
6	Alex Baldaccini	Italy	1:04:59
7	Marco De Gasperi	Italy	1:05:10
8	Yuriy Chechun	Russia	1:05:41
9	Glenn Randall	United States	1:05:48
10	Atoy Estifanos	Eritrea	1:05:50

Teams
Rank	Team	Points
Gold medal	Eritrea (Petro Mamu, Azeria Teklay, Debesay Tsiege, Atoy Estifanos, Zerit Werede)	17
Silver medal	Italy (Gabriele Abate, Alex Baldaccini, Marco De Gasperi, Xavier Chevrier, Bernard Dematteis, Antonio Toninelli)	31
Bronze medal	Russia (Andrey Safronov, Yuriy Chechun, Andrey Minyakov, Andrey Shklyaev, Alexey Pagnuev, Oleg Kharitonov)	75

- Totals: 138 finishers, 21 national teams

=== Senior women ===
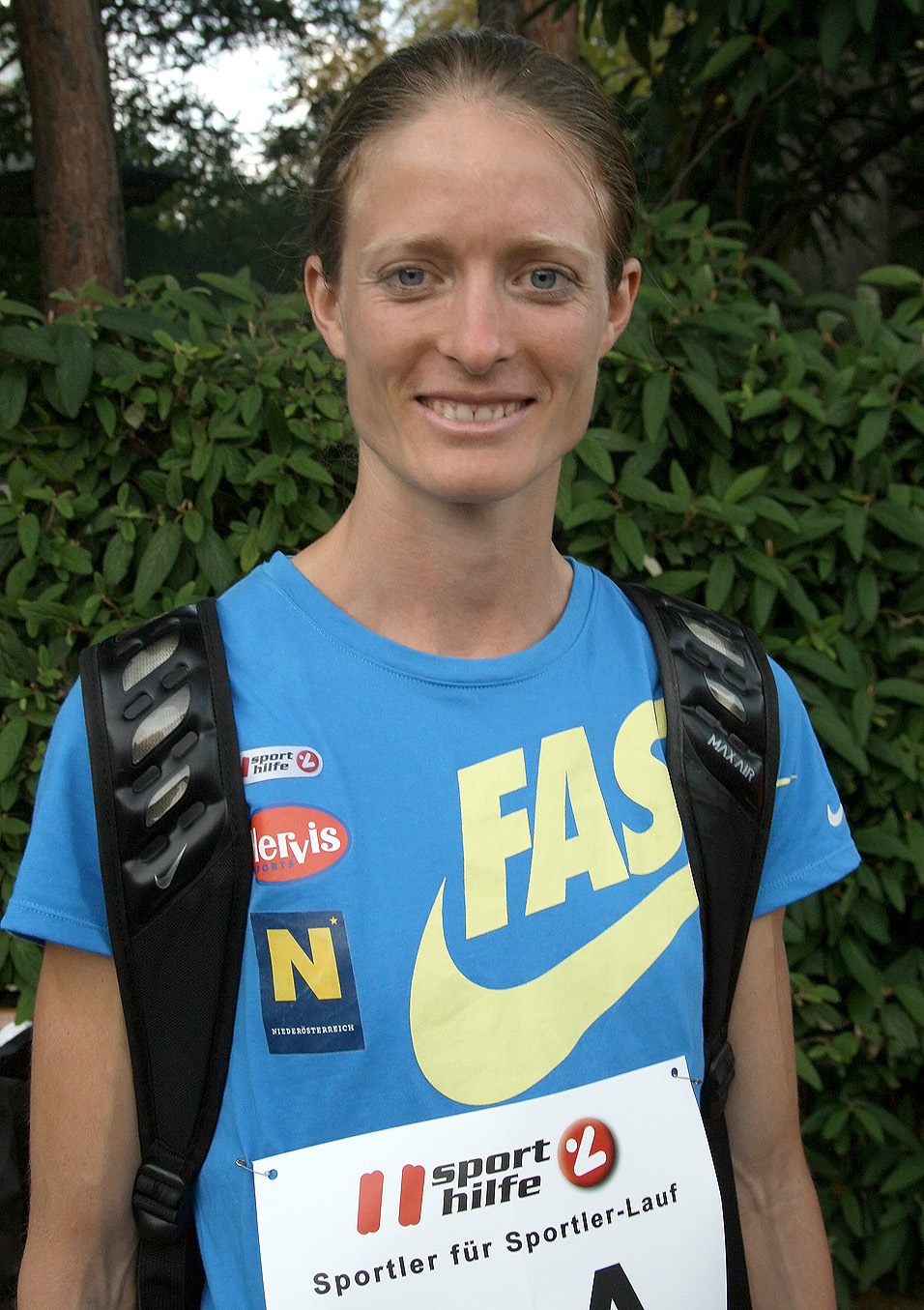
Andrea Mayr, the 2010 winner, regained the women's title.

Individual race
Rank	Athlete	Country	Time (m:s)
Gold medal	Andrea Mayr	Austria	46:35
Silver medal	Valentina Belotti	Italy	47:04
Bronze medal	Morgan Aritola	United States	47:26
4	Burcu Buyukbezgin	Turkey	47:36
5	Sabine Reiner	Austria	48:07
6	Mateja Kosovelj	Slovenia	48:27
7	Stevie Kremer	United States	48:54
8	Melody Fairchild	United States	48:57
9	María Rodriguez	Colombia	49:08
10	Cristiana Frumuz	Romania	49:24

Teams
Rank	Team	Points
Gold medal	United States (Morgan Arritola, Stevie Kremer, Melody Fairchild, Brandy Erholtz)	18
Silver medal	Italy (Valentina Belotti, Renate Rungger, Alice Gaggi, Antonella Confortola)	29
Bronze medal	Switzerland (Monika Furholz, Martina Strähl, Barnadette Meier, Bettina Steiger)	58

- Totals: 88 finishers, 19 national teams

=== Junior men ===
Individual race
Rank	Athlete	Country	Time (m:s)
Gold medal	Michael Cherop	Uganda	42:33
Silver medal	Adem Karagoz	Turkey	42:45
Bronze medal	Sonmez Dag	Turkey	43:10
4	Moses Kurong	Uganda	43:20
5	Nekagenet Crippa	Italy	44:05
6	Anton Palzer	Germany	44:09
7	Charles Vannson	France	44:49
8	Abdullah Mande	Uganda	45:08
9	Thibaut Imbert	France	45:27
10	Jan Janu	Czech Republic	45:30

Teams
Rank	Team	Points
Gold medal	Uganda (Michael Cherop, Moses Kurong, Abdullah Mande)	13
Silver medal	Turkey (Adem Karagoz, Sonmez Dag, Suat Karabulak)	20
Bronze medal	Italy (Nekagenet Crippa, Dylan Titon, Cesare Maestri, Michael Monella)	30

- Totals: 71 finishers, 16 national teams

=== Junior women ===
Individual race
Rank	Athlete	Country	Time (m:s)
Gold medal	Sevilay Eytemis	Turkey	20:14
Silver medal	Julia Lettl	Germany	20:53
Bronze medal	Lea Einfalt	Slovenia	21:09
4	Annabel Mason	United Kingdom	21:39
5	Alexandra Wallimann	Switzerland	22:02
6	Melanie Hyder	United Kingdom	22:06
7	Anezka Drahotava	Czech Republic	22:20
8	Cesminaz Yilmaz	Turkey	22:39
9	Margot Pelanne	France	22:50
10	Vera Enizerkina	Russia	22:58

Teams
Rank	Team	Points
Gold medal	Turkey (Sevilay Eytemis, Cesminaz Yilmaz, Sseyran Adanir)	9
Silver medal	Great Britain (Annabel Mason, Melanie Hyder, Caroline Lambert)	10
Bronze medal	Germany (Julia Lettl, Kristina Schollerer, Carla Holland)	15

- Totals: 46 finishers, 15 national teams

== Medal table ==
Rank	Nation	Gold	Silver	Bronze	Total
1	Turkey (TUR)	2	2	1	5
2	Eritrea (ERI)	2	1	0	3
3	Uganda (UGA)	2	0	0	2
4	United States (USA)	1	0	1	2
5	Austria (AUT)	1	0	0	1
6	Italy (ITA)	0	3	1	4
7	Germany (GER)	0	1	1	2
8	Great Britain (GBR)	0	1	0	1
9	Russia (RUS)	0	0	2	2
10	Slovenia (SLO)	0	0	1	1
10	Switzerland (SUI)	0	0	1	1
Totals (11 entries)		8	8	8	24

== Participating nations ==
- Note: total of 43 nations includes observer nations
- Albania
- Australia
- Austria
- Belarus
- Belgium
- Bulgaria
- Cameroon
- Canada
- Colombia
- Croatia
- Czech Republic
- Equatorial Guinea
- Eritrea
- France
- Great Britain
- Germany
- Hungary
- Ireland
- Israel
- Italy
- Japan
- Macedonia
- Malta
- Mexico
- Monaco
- Netherlands
- New Zealand
- Nigeria
- Norway
- Poland
- Portugal
- Romania
- Russia
- San Marino
- Slovenia
- South Africa
- Sweden
- Switzerland
- Turkey
- Uganda
- Ukraine
- United States
- Venezuela
