= 2005 European Mountain Running Championships =

- Organisers: EAA
- Edition: 4th
- Date: 10 July
- Host city: Heiligenblut am Großglockner, Austria

The 2005 European Mountain Running Championships were held in Heiligenblut am Großglockner, Austria,

== Results ==
=== Men ===
Rank	Runner	Country	Time (m:s)
Gold medal	Florian Heinzle	Austria	
Silver medal	Helmut Schiessl	Germany	
Bronze medal	Marco Degasperi	Italy	
4	Raymond Fontaine	France	
5	Robert Krupicka	Czech Republic	
6	Marton Bakcicak	Slovakia	
7	Marco Gaiardo	Italy	
8	Martin Cox	United Kingdom	
9	Steven Vernon	United Kingdom	
10	Gabriele Abate	Italy	

=== Women ===
Rank	Runner	Country	Time (m:s)
Gold medal	Andrea Mayr	Austria	
Silver medal	Anna Pichrtová	Czech Republic	
Bronze medal	Angelina Joly-Flueck	Switzerland	
4	Svetlana Demidenko	Russia	
5	Vittoria Salvini	Italy	
6	Nathalie Etzensburger	Switzerland	
7	Mary Wilkinson	United Kingdom	
8	Victoria Wilkinson	United Kingdom	
9	Antonella Confortola	Italy	
10	Isabelle Guillot	France	
