= 1997 World Mountain Running Trophy =

- Organisers: WMRA
- Edition: 13th
- Date: 7 September
- Host city: Male Svatonovice, Czech Republic
- Level: Senior and Junior
- Events: 8

The 1997 World Mountain Running Championships was the 13th edition of the global mountain running competition, World Mountain Running Championships, organised by the World Mountain Running Association and was held in Male Svatonovice, Czech Republic on 7 September 1997.

== Results ==
=== Individual ===
==== Men individual ====
Distance 11.6 km, difference in height 900 m, participants 116.

Rank	Athlete	Country	Time
1st place, gold medalist(s)	Marco De Gasperi	Italy	54:11
2nd place, silver medalist(s)	Davide Milesi	Italy	54:25
3rd place, bronze medalist(s)	Thierry Breuil	France	54:29
4	Aaron Strong	New Zealand	54:35
5	Malchem Owen	South Africa	54:35
6	Robert Petro	Slovakia	55:05
7	Lucio Fregona	Italy	55:16
8	Antonio Molinari	Italy	55:18
9	Billy Burns	England	55:38
10	Thierry Icart	France	56:10

==== Women individual ====
Distance 7.8 km, difference in height 600 m, participants 66.

Rank	Athlete	Country	Time
1st place, gold medalist(s)	Isabelle Guillot	France	40:27
2nd place, silver medalist(s)	Jaroslava Bukvajova	Slovakia	40:43
3rd place, bronze medalist(s)	Melissa Moon	New Zealand	41:26
4	Catherine Lallemand	Belgium	41:47
5	Carol Greenwood	England	41:58
6	Rosita Rota Gelpi	Italy	42:04
7	Benedicte Molle	France	42:16
8	Flavia Gaviglio	Italy	42:34
9	Martine Javerzac P.	France	43:08
10	Maria Grazia Roberti	Italy	43:24

==== Junior Men individual ====
Distance 7.8 km, difference in height 600 m, participants 58.

Rank	Athlete	Country	Time
1st place, gold medalist(s)	Petr Losman	Czech Republic	37:27
2nd place, silver medalist(s)	Roberto Del Soglio	Italy	37:53
3rd place, bronze medalist(s)	Martin Bialek	Slovakia	37:58
4	Lukas Eberle	Switzerland	38:16
5	Andrew Davies	Wales	38:32
6	Alessio Conti	Italy	38:40
7	[[Alexei Vesselov]]	Russia	38:57
8	[[Albero Mosca]]	Italy	39:01
9	Gabriele Abate	Italy	39:24
10	[[Harry Thelis]]	Belgium	39:37

==== Junior Women individual ====
Distance 4.1 km, difference in height 300 m, participants 34.

Rank	Athlete	Country	Time
1st place, gold medalist(s)	Victoria Wilkinson	England	21:59
2nd place, silver medalist(s)	Jenifer Wischnath	Germany	22:11
3rd place, bronze medalist(s)	Suzana Kocumova	Czech Republic	22:33
4	Samantha Gray	Wales	22:57
5	Cornelia Heinzle	Austria	23:07
6	Lucie Navratilova	Czech Republic	23:15
7	Francesca Rastelli	Italy	23:23
8	Nadejda Timefeeva	Russia	23:24
9	Laura Grossman	Scotland	23:48
10	[[Charlotte Sanderson]]	England	24:04

=== Team ===
==== Men ====
Rank	Country	Points
Gold medal	Italy; Marco De Gasperi; Davide Milesi; Lucio Fregona; Antonio Molinari	18
Silver medal	France; Thierry Breuil; Thierry Icart; Sylvain Richard; Philippe Sirieix	44
Bronze medal	England; Billy Burns; Richard Findlow; Craig Roberts; Ian Holmes	69

==== Women ====
Rank	Country	Points
Gold medal	France; Isabelle Guillot; Bénédicte Molle; Martine Javerzac	17
Silver medal	Italy; Rosita Rota Gelpi; Flavia Gaviglio; Maria Grazia Roberti; Mirela Cabodi	24
Bronze medal	Slovakia; Jaroslava Bukvajova; Alena Briedova; Anna Balosakova	38

==== Junior Men ====
Rank	Country	Points
Gold medal	Italy; Roberto Del Soglio; Alessio Conti; Albero Mosca; Gabriele Abate	16
Silver medal	Czech Republic; Petr Losman; Daniel Sir; Lukas Razym; Jaroslaw Mollinger	32
Bronze medal	Switzerland; Lukas Eberle; Roger Hartman; Thomas Rickelmann	41

==== Junior Women ====
Rank	Country	Points
Gold medal	Czech Republic; Suzana Kocumova; Lucie Navratilova; Lenka Hanusova	9
Silver medal	England; Victoria Wilkinson; Charlotte Sanderson; Emma O'Shena	11
Bronze medal	Italy; Francesca Rastelli; Asha Tonolini; Giusepina Rinaudo	18
