= 2016 World Mountain Running Championships =

- Organisers: WMRA
- Edition: 32nd
- Date: 11 September
- Host city: Sapareva Banya, Bulgaria
- Events: 4

The 2016 World Mountain Running Championships was the 32nd edition of the global mountain running competition, World Mountain Running Championships, organised by the World Mountain Running Association and was held in Sapareva Banya, Bulgaria on 11 September 2016.

== Results ==
=== Men individual ===
Distance 12.5 km, total ascent of 1,390 m total descent of 20 m, participants 141.

Rank	Athlete	Country	Time
1st place, gold medalist(s)	Joseph Gray	United States	1:02:13
2nd place, silver medalist(s)	Israel Morales	Mexico	1:03:52
3rd place, bronze medalist(s)	Ahmet Arslan	Turkey	1:04:48
4	Hayden Hawks	United States	1:05:02
5	Filex Chemonges	Uganda	1:05:06
6	Bernard Dematteis	Italy	1:05.06
7	Brett Hales	United States	1:05:10
8	Martin Dematteis	Italy	1:05:25
9	Alex Baldaccini	Italy	1:05:36
10	Xavier Chevrier	Italy	1:05:50
11	Andrew Douglas	United Kingdom	1:05:56
12	Emmanuel Meyssat	France	1:06:16
13	Christopher Smith	United Kingdom	1:06:21
14	Torstein Tengsareid	Norway	1:06:33
15	Norberto Abad	Mexico	1:06:41
16	Toni Lautenbacher	Germany	1:06:46
17	Julien Rancon	France	1:06:57
18	Francesco Puppi	Italy	1:07:30
19	Jonas Lehmann	Germany	1:07:43
20	Andy Wacker	United States	1:07:47

=== Men team ===
Rank	Country	Athletes	Points
1st place, gold medalist(s)	United States	Joseph Gray, Hayden Hawks, Brett Hales, Andy Wacker	1+4+7+20=32
2nd place, silver medalist(s)	Italy	Bernard Dematteis, Martin Dematteis, Alex Baldaccini, Xavier Chevrier	6+8+9+10=33
3rd place, bronze medalist(s)	Mexico	Israel Morales, Norberto Abad, Juan Carlos Carera, Said Diaz	2+15+23+29=69
4	Germany	Toni Lautenbacher, Jonas Lehmann, Andreas Seewald, Maximilian Zeus	16+19+21+27=83

=== Women individual ===
Distance 7.3 km, total ascent of 700 m, total descent of 20 m, participants 67.

Rank	Athlete	Country	Time
1st place, gold medalist(s)	Andrea Mayr	Austria	39:04
2nd place, silver medalist(s)	Valentina Belotti	Italy	40:47
3rd place, bronze medalist(s)	Christel Dewalle	France	41:05
4	Sona Vnencáková	Slovakia	41:17
5	Petra Nováková	Czech Republic	42:28
6	Silvia Schwaiger	Slovakia	42:39
7	Alice Gaggi	Italy	42:42
8	Sara Bottarelli	Italy	42:46
9	Kim Nedeau	United States	42:51
10	Hatti Archer	United Kingdom	43:01
11	Victoria Wilkinson	United Kingdom	43:04
12	Addie Bracy	United States	43:08
13	Pavla Schorná Matyášová	Czech Republic	43:19
14	Monika Preibischová	Czech Republic	43:20
15	Ladia Albertson-Junkans	United States	43:25
16	Emily Collinge	United Kingdom	43:30
17	Melanie Noll	Germany	43:33
18	Bethany Sachtleben	United States	43:39
19	Axelle Mollaret	France	43:39
20	Fernanda G. T. Camargo	Colombia	43:43

=== Women team ===
Rank	Country	Athletes	Points
1st place, gold medalist(s)	Italy	Valentina Belotti, Alice Gaggi, Sara Bottarelli, Antonella Confortola	2+7+8=17
2nd place, silver medalist(s)	Czech Republic	Petra Nováková, Pavla Schorná Matyášová, Monika Preibischová	5+13+14=32
3rd place, bronze medalist(s)	United States	Kim Nedeau, Addie Bracy, Ladia Albertson-Junkans	9+12+15=36
4	United Kingdom	Hatti Archer, Victoria Wilkinson, Emily Collinge	10+11+16=37

=== Junior Men individual ===
Distance 7.3 km, total ascent of 700 m total descent of 20 m, participants 65.

Rank	Athlete	Country	Time
1st place, gold medalist(s)	Joel Ayeko	Uganda	33:53
2nd place, silver medalist(s)	Victor Kiplangat	Uganda	35:39
3rd place, bronze medalist(s)	Albert Chemutai	Uganda	35:50
4	Ramazan Karagöz	Turkey	36:05
5	Ferhat Bozkurt	Turkey	36:40
6	Daniele Pattis	Italy	37:12
7	Davide Magnini	Italy	37:22
8	Stian Overgaard Aarvik	Norway	37:35
9	Jack Beaumont	New Zealand	37:54
10	Maximilien Drion du Chapois	Belgium	38:03
11	Joseph Benson	United States	38:13
12	Johann Baujard	France	38:20
13	Euan Gillham	United Kingdom	38:25
14	Stefan Knopf	Germany	38:39
15	Gabriel Bularda	Romania	38:49
16	Phillip Rocha	United States	38:50
17	Cristian Meza	Mexico	38:51
18	Sylvain Cachard	France	39:25
19	Robin Faricier	France	39:39
20	Marek Chirascina	Czech Republic	39:40

=== Junior Men team ===
Rank	Country	Athletes	Points
1st place, gold medalist(s)	Uganda	Joel Ayeko, Victor Kiplangat, Albert Chemutai	1+2+3=6
2nd place, silver medalist(s)	Italy	Daniele Pattis, Davide Magnini, Riccardo Rabino, Andrea Rostan	6+7+28=41
3rd place, bronze medalist(s)	France	Johann Baujard, Sylvain Cachard, Robin Faricier	12+18+19=49
4.	United States	Joseph Benson, Phillip Rocha, Eduardo Herrera, Ben Butler	11+16+22=49

=== Junior Women individual ===
Distance 3.5 km, total ascent of 500 m total descent of 20 m, participants 52.

Rank	Athlete	Country	Time
1st place, gold medalist(s)	Sarah Kistner	Germany	22:48
2nd place, silver medalist(s)	Michaela Stránská	Czech Republic	23:31
3rd place, bronze medalist(s)	Bronwen Jenkinson	United Kingdom	23:56
4	Agathe Thibert	France	24:19
5	Barbora Havlíčková	Czech Republic	24:20
6	Nada Balcarczyk	Germany	24:34
7	Rita Mineiro	Portugal	24:43
8	Klaudia Pawlus	Poland	24:49
9	Francesca Franchi	Italy	24:51
10	Verena Streitberger	Austria	24:54
11	Federica Zanne	Italy	25:03
12	Katerina Divišová	Czech Republic	25:07
13	Lorenza Beccaria	Italy	25:15
14	Gabriela Andreea Doroftei	Romania	25:16
15	Claire Graves	United States	25:31
16	Dilyana Minkina	Bulgaria	25:33
17	Salome Baudoin	France	25:34
18	Lisa Oed	Germany	25:34
19	Lushka Kokotanekova	Bulgaria	25:37
20	Heidi Davies	United Kingdom	25:42

=== Junior Women team ===
Rank	Country	Athletes	Points
1st place, gold medalist(s)	Czech Republic	Michaela Stránská, Barbora Havlíčková, Katerina Divišová, Bára Styblová	2+5+12=19
2nd place, silver medalist(s)	Germany	Sarah Kistner, Nada Balcarczyk, Lisa Oed	1+6+18=25
3rd place, bronze medalist(s)	Italy	Francesca Franchi, Federica Zanne, Lorenza Beccaria, Valentina Gemetto	9+11+13=33
4.	United Kingdom	Bronwen Jenkinson, Heidi Davies, Elizabeth Apsley	3+20+27=50
