= 2013 European Mountain Running Championships =

Held in Borovets, Bulgaria

- Organisers: EAA
- Edition: 12th
- Date: 6 July
- Host city: Borovets, Bulgaria
- Distances: 11.8 km +1152m– Men; 8.8 km +1027m– Women; 8.8 km +1027m– Junior men 3.5 km +530m– Junior women

The 2013 European Mountain Running Championships were held on 6 July at Borovets in Sofia, Bulgaria. The competition featured four individual races: The men's race was 11.8 km long and with an ascent of 1152 m, the women's and junior men's races were 8.8 km long with an ascent of 1072 m. and the junior women's race was 3.5 km long with an ascent of 530 m.

In the men's race, Bernard Dematteis ended Ahmet Arslan's six year winning streak by finishing first, over a minute ahead of Alex Baldaccini who finished second and Arslan who finished third. In the women's race, Andrea Mayr won her second title, beating Valentina Belotti and Mateja Kosovelj by 1 minute 5 seconds and 1 minute 18 seconds respectively. In total 217 athletes from 27 countries participated.

== Results ==
=== Men ===
Rank	Athlete	Country	Time (m:s)
Gold medal	Bernard Dematteis	Italy	56:30
Silver medal	Alex Baldaccini	Italy	57:35
Bronze medal	Ahmet Arslan	Turkey	57:47
4	Xavier Chevrier	Italy	58:01
5	Steve Vernon	United Kingdom	58:33
6	Enrique Meneses	Spain	58:50
7	Robert Krupicka	Czech Republic	58:52
8	Chris Smith	United Kingdom	59:12

=== Women ===
Rank	Athlete	Country	Time (m:s)
Gold medal	Andrea Mayr	Austria	51:49
Silver medal	Valentina Belotti	Italy	52:54
Bronze medal	Mateja Kosovelj	Slovenia	53:08
4	Elisa Desco	Italy	53:42
5	Renate Runnger	Italy	54:05
6	Emma Clayton	United Kingdom	55:16
7	Christel Dewalle	France	56:01
8	Bernadette Meier	Switzerland	56:12
