= Ercan Muslu =

Turkish long-distance runner

Personal information
- Nationality: Turkish
- Born: 1 December 1988 (age 37) Sungurbeyli, Gümüşhane, Turkey
- Height: 160 cm (5 ft 3 in)
- Weight: 52 kg (115 lb)

Sport
- Country: Turkey
- Sport: Marathon, mountain running
Medal record
Mountain Running
Representing Turkey
European Championships
Silver medal – second place	2012 Denizli	Senior

Ercan Muslu (born 1 December 1988 in Sungurbeyli, Gümüşhane) is a long-distance runner from Turkey competing in marathon and mountain running.

He was born in 1988 in Sungurbeyli village (formerly Kuşyuva) of Gümüşhane. After completing the Commerce Vocational High School for Commerce in his hometown, he attended Erciyes University in Kayseri, where he is studying Physical Education and Sports.

In 2012, he became gold medalist in the marathon event at the Balkan Championship in Belgrade, Serbia. The same year, he took the bronze medal at the Balkan Mountain Running Champşonships on 7 June in Nova Zagora, Bulgaria. At the 2012 European Mountain Running Championships held on 7 July in Denizli, Turkey, Muslu won the silver medal after six-time gold medalist Ahmet Arslan.

== Achievements ==
Year	Competition	Venue	Position	Event	Notes
2006	13th European Cross Country Championships	(Italy) San Giorgio su Legnano	J 4th Team	Cross country	
2007	European Teams Cross Country Championships	(Turkey) Istanbul	J 5th	Cross country	
2007	European Teams Cross Country Championships	(Turkey) Istanbul	J 1st Team	Cross country	
2012	Balkan Championships	(Serbia) Belgrade	1st	Marathon	
2012	Balkan Mountain - Running Championships	(Bulgaria) Nova Zagora	3rd	Mountain	
2012	11th European Mountain Running Championships	(Turkey) Denizli	2nd	Mountain	
2015	Hamburg Marathon	(Germany) Hamburg	23nd	Marathon	
