= 1995 European Mountain Running Trophy =

- Organisers: WMRA
- Edition: 1st
- Date: 15 July
- Host city: Valleraugue, France
- Events: 2
- Distances: 12 km
- Official website: wmra.ch

The 1995 European Mountain Running Trophy was the inaugural edition of the annual international mountain running competition between European countries, organised by the World Mountain Running Association. It was held on 15 July in Valleraugue, France, and featured 12-kilometre races for both men and women. In the men's race Austria's Helmut Schmuck was victorious with minor medallists Antonio Molinari and Davide Milesi leading Italy to the men's team title. Eroica Spiess led a Swiss sweep of the podium in the women's race.

The competition followed an unofficial European competition held in the previous year in Italy. The official name of the competition was European Mountain Running Trophy from 1995 to 2001 and then from 2002 the European Mountain Running Championships.

== Results ==
=== Men ===
==== Individual ====
Rank	Runner	Nation	Time
1st place, gold medalist(s)	Helmut Schmuck	Austria	56.53
2nd place, silver medalist(s)	Antonio Molinari	Italy	57.25
3rd place, bronze medalist(s)	Davide Milesi	Italy	58.00
4	Lucio Fregona	Italy	58.39
5	Aziz Nih	France	58.53
6	Galdino Pilot	Italy	59.08
7	Martin Sambale	Germany	59.33
8	Toni Walker	Switzerland	59.40
9	Jean-Paul Payet	France	59.52
10	Martin Sigrist	Switzerland	1:00.00

==== Team ====
Rank	Nation	Runners	Points
1st place, gold medalist(s)	Italy	Antonio Molinari, Davide Milesi, Lucio Fregona, Galdino Pilot	9 pts
2nd place, silver medalist(s)	France	Aziz Nih, Jean-Paul Payet, Thierry Icarus, Sylvain Richard	26 pts
3rd place, bronze medalist(s)	Germany	Martin Zambale, Dieter Ranftl, Guido Dold, Philippe Kehl	31 pts

=== Women ===
==== Individual ====
Rank	Runner	Nation	Time
1st place, gold medalist(s)	Eroica Spiess	Switzerland	1:05.17
2nd place, silver medalist(s)	Cristina Moretti	Switzerland	1:05.20
3rd place, bronze medalist(s)	Carolina Reiber	Switzerland	1:07.32
4	Johanna Baumgartner	Germany	1:07.50
5	Evelyne Mura H.	France	1:08.47
6	Nives Curti	Italy	1:09.34
7	Stephanie Manel	France	1:10.30
8	Valeria Colpo	Italy	1:10.48
9	Odile Leveque	France	1:10.55
10	Elsbeth Heinzle	Austria	1:11.09

==== Team ====
Rank	Nation	Runners	Points
1st place, gold medalist(s)	Switzerland	Eroika Spiess, Cristina Moretti, Carolina Ryber	3 pts
2nd place, silver medalist(s)	France	Evelyn Murat, Stephanie Manel, Odile Levek	12 pts
3rd place, bronze medalist(s)	Italy	Nives Curti, Valeria Colpo, Daniela Spilotti	14 pts
