= Italian Mountain Running Championships =

- Sport: Mountain Running
- Founded: Italian Athletics Federation (FIDAL)
- First season: 1976
- Country: Italy
- Most recent champions: Xavier Chevrier (men); Alice Gaggi (women)
- Most titles: 5 Antonio Molinari; Bernard Dematteis (men); 3 six runners (female)
- Website: FIDAL web site

The Italian Mountain Running Championships (Italian: Campionati italiani di corsa in montagna) are the national championships in mountain running, organised every year by the FIDAL from 1976 (men) and 1980 (women).

== Description ==
Usually the national championship is divided into three races, one only climbing the mountain, one uphill and downhill and a chronoscale (not necessarily in this order), but from 2014 there are only two races. The Italian champion is determined by the points ranking of these three races.

== Editions and winners ==
Edition	Year	Races	Date of final race	Venue of final race	Male Champion	Female Champion	Notes
1st	1976				Giovanni Mostacchetti		
2nd	1977				Andrea Giupponi		
3rd	1978				Claudio Simi		
4th	1979				Gianni Rovedatti		
5th	1980				Claudio Simi	Agnese Possamai	
6th	1981				Privato Pezzoli	Agnese Possamai	
7th	1982				Claudio Galeazzi	Maria Canins	
8th	1983				Fausto Bonzi	Alba Milana	
9th	1984				Fausto Bonzi	Gabriella Carletti	
10th	1985				Fausto Bonzi	Manuela Di Centa	
11th	1986				Fausto Bonzi	Valentina Bottarelli	
12th	1987				Alfonso Vallicella	Maria Cocchetti	
13th	1988				Dino Tadello	Maria Cocchetti	
14th	1989				Fausto Bonzi	Manuela Di Centa	
15th	1990				Severino Bernardini	Maria Cocchetti	
16th	1991				Costantino Bertolla	Manuela Di Centa	
17th	1992				Davide Milesi	Antonella Molinari	
18th	1993				Adriano Pezzoli	Nives Curti	
19th	1994				Andrea Agostini	Nives Curti	
20th	1995				Davide Milesi	Nives Curti	
21st	1996				Lucio Fregona	Flavia Gaviglio	
22nd	1997				Antonio Molinari	Maria Grazia Roberti	
23rd	1998				Antonio Molinari	Rosita Rota Gelpi	
24th	1999				Antonio Molinari	Rosita Rota Gelpi	
25th	2000				Antonio Molinari	Pierangela Baronchelli	
26th	2001				Antonio Molinari	Flavia Gaviglio	
27th	2002				Marco De Gasperi	Vittoria Salvini	
28th	2003				Marco De Gasperi	Antonella Confortola	
29th	2004	3	1 August	Adrara San Martino	Marco De Gasperi	Flavia Gaviglio	
30th	2005	3	28 August	Vittorio Veneto	Marco Gaiardo	Vittoria Salvini	
31st	2006	3	20 August	Edolo-Mortirolo	Marco Gaiardo	Maria Grazia Roberti	
32nd	2007	3	26 August	Madesimo	Marco Gaiardo	Vittoria Salvini	
33rd	2008	3	17 August	Cedegolo-Cevo	Bernard Dematteis	Elisa Desco	
34th	2009	3	23 August	Domodossola	Martin Dematteis	Valentina Belotti	
35th	2010	3	22 August	Susa	Martin Dematteis	Valentina Belotti	
36th	2011	3	21 August	Zelbio	Martin Dematteis	Antonella Confortola	
37th	2012	3	19 August	Bolognano d'Arco	Bernard Dematteis	Antonella Confortola	
38th	2013	3	18 August	San Giacomo di Brentonico	Bernard Dematteis	Elisa Desco	
39th	2014	2	10 August	Pergine Valsugana	Bernard Dematteis	Alice Gaggi	
40th	2015	2	2 August	Levico Terme	Xavier Chevrier	Elisa Desco	
41st	2016	2	31 July	Cortina d'Ampezzo	Bernard Dematteis	Valentina Belotti	
42nd	2017	2	28 August	Margno	Xavier Chevrier	Alice Gaggi	
43rd	2018	2	21 July	Tavagnasco	Bernard Dematteis	Elisa Desco	
44th	2019	2	22 September	Arco	Cesare Maestri	Elisa Desco	
45th	2020	2	23 August	Susa	Cesare Maestri	Gaia Colli	
46th	2021	2	14 August	Margno	Cesare Maestri	Francesca Ghelfi	

== See also ==
- Italian Long Distance Mountain Running Championships
