= 2006 European Mountain Running Championships =

- Organisers: EAA
- Edition: 5th
- Date: 9 July
- Host city: Úpice–Malé Svatonovice, Czech Republic
- Events: 4
- Distances: 11160 m – Men; 7740 m – Women ? km – U20 men ? km – U20 women
- Participation: 70 athletes from 27 nations

The 2006 European Mountain Running Championships were held in north-eastern Bohemia, Czech Republic, between 8 July and 9 July 2006. They were that year's area championships for mountain running, held by the European Athletic Association.

Teams arrived in Trutnov, at the Hotel Patria on 7 July and the competition officially began on 8 July in Malé Svatoňovice at the bottom of the Jestřebí Mountains (16 km from Trutnov, 5 km from Úpice).

== Results ==
=== Men ===
Rank	Runner	Country	Time (m:s)
Gold medal	Marco Gaiardo	Italy	57:42
Silver medal	Selahattin Selçuk	Turkey	57:50
Bronze medal	Julien Rancon	France	57:59
4	Enrique Meneses	Spain	58:42
5	Gabriele Abate	Italy	58:48
6	Mitja Kosovelj	Slovenia	58:53
7	Andrew Jones	United Kingdom	59:03
8	Timothy Davies	United Kingdom	59:30
9	José Carvalho	Portugal	59:50
10	Daniel Wosik	Poland	59:52

=== Women ===
Rank	Runner	Country	Time (m:s)
Gold medal	Anna Pichrtová	Czech Republic	41:28
Silver medal	Mateja Kosovelj	Slovenia	42:12
Bronze medal	Vittoria Salvini	Italy	43:32
4	Sylvie Claus	France	43:53
5	Marta Fernandez de Castro	Spain	44:07
6	Isabelle Guillot	France	44:20
7	Maria Grazia Roberti	Italy	44:42
8	Monica Morstofolini	Italy	44:43
9	Iva Milesová	Czech Republic	44:52
10	Irena Šádková	Czech Republic	44:55
