= 2007 European Mountain Running Championships =

- Organisers: EAA
- Edition: 6th
- Date: 14 July
- Host city: Cauterets, France
- Events: 4
- Distances: 12.8 km +1,570 m– Men; 8.5 km +1,010 m– Women; 8.5 km +1,010 m– U20 men 4 km +400 m– U20 women

The 2007 European Mountain Running Championships were held on 14 July in Cauterets, France. Held by the European Athletic Association.

The championships comprised four races, incorporating junior races for the first time: the men's race, which was 12.8 km long with a 1,570 m ascent, the women's and under-20s men's competitions over 8.5 km and containing a 1,010 m ascent, and finally the under-20s women's race which was competed over 4 km with a rise of 400 m.

Ahmet Arslan of Turkey won the title in the men's senior race while the Norwegian Anita Evertsen took the gold medal in the women's race. Italy reached to the senior men's team gold medal and Switzerland won the women's team gold. The junior men's competition was largely a Turkish affair, with Mehmet Akkoyun winning gold and leading a 1-2-3 for his country. The women's junior race was won by Lucija Krkoc from Slovenia. United Kingdom took the team gold.

== Results ==
=== Men's senior race ===
Rank	Athlete	Country	Time (h:m:s)
Gold medal	Ahmet Arslan	Turkey	1:08:39
Silver medal	Marco De Gasperi	Italy	1:08:50
Bronze medal	Marco Gaiardo	Italy	1:09:09

Teams
Rank	Team	Points
Gold medal	Italy	15
Silver medal	France	31
Bronze medal	Germany	36

- Total participants: 67 runners finished and 17 teams.

=== Women's senior race ===
Rank	Athlete	Country	Time (m:s)
Gold medal	Anita Evertsen	Norway	51:45
Silver medal	Anna Pichrtova	Czech Republic	52:34
Bronze medal	Kirsten Otterbu	Norway	52:56

Teams
Rank	Team	Points
Gold medal	Switzerland	17
Silver medal	Czech Republic	22
Bronze medal	Italy	29

- Total participants: 65 runners finished and 16 teams.

=== Men's under-20s race ===
Rank	Athlete	Country	Time (m:s)
Gold medal	Mehmet Akkoyun	Turkey	48:27
Silver medal	Emrah Akalın	Turkey	48:34
Bronze medal	Mahmut Uruclu	Turkey	48:40

Teams
Rank	Team	Points
Gold medal	Turkey	6
Silver medal	Germany	21
Bronze medal	Italy	34

- Total participants: 36 runners finished and 9 teams.

=== Women's under-20s race ===
Rank	Athlete	Country	Time (m:s)
Gold medal	Lucija Krkoc	Slovenia	23:33
Silver medal	Kerstin Strauss	Germany	23:58
Bronze medal	Hannah Bateson	United Kingdom	24:50

Teams
Rank	Team	Points
Gold medal	United Kingdom	8
Silver medal	Austria	10
Bronze medal	Slovenia	13

- Total participants: 20 runners finished and 6 teams.
