= 2004 European Mountain Running Championships =

- Organisers: WMRA
- Edition: 10th
- Date: 4 July
- Host city: (Poland) Korbielów
- Events: 2
- Official website: wmra.ch

The 2004 European Mountain Running Championships were held in Korbielów, Poland.

== Results ==
=== Men ===
Rank	Runner	Country	Time (m:s)
Gold medal	Marco Degasperi	Italy	
Silver medal	Florian Heinzle	Austria	
Bronze medal	Gaiardo Marco	Italy	
4	Robert Krupicka	Czech Republic	
5	Selcuk Selehattin	Turkey	
6	Alessio Rinaldi	Italy	
7	Raymond Fontaine	France	
8	Alex Gex-Farby	Switzerland	
9	Peter Lamovec	Slovenia	
10	Davide Chicco	Italy	

=== Women ===
Rank	Runner	Country	Time (m:s)
Gold medal	Anna Pichrtová	Czech Republic	
Silver medal	Andrea Mayr	Austria	
Bronze medal	Rosita Rota Gelpi	Italy	
4	Guillot Isabelle	France	
5	Izabela Zatorska	Poland	
6	Tracey Brindley	United Kingdom	
7	Antonella Confotola	Italy	
8	Flavia Gavigilio	Italy	
9	Lucinda Moreiras	Portugal	
10	Lynn Wilson	United Kingdom	
