= European Mountain Running Championships =

Annual international race

- Status: active
- Genre: sports event
- Date: midyear
- Frequency: annual
- Inaugurated: 1994
- Organiser: European Athletic Association

The European Mountain Running Championships is an annual international mountain running race. Inaugurated in 2002, it is organised by the European Athletic Association (EAA) in July each year. The venue for the championships is changed each year.

The history of the competition lies in the European Mountain Running Trophy, which was first held in 1994 in Quantin, Belluno, Italy. It was officially sanctioned by the World Mountain Running Association in 1995 and continued until 2001, at which point the EAA introduced the official European Mountain Running Championships.

Exclusively a senior championships until 2009, the competition now features separate senior and junior (under 20s) races for both men and women. Medals are awarded on an individual and national team basis. For the team competition, the finishing positions of each country's top three runners are combined, and the team with the smallest cumulative total wins the medals.

The 2021 edition was cancelled. A new competition was started in 2022, the European Athletics Off-Road Running Championships, which was described as the "forerunner" to the European Mountain Running Championships. The Off-Road Running Championships was held in 2022 and 2024 and as of 2024, it is next scheduled to be held in 2026.

== Editions ==
| Edition | Year | Location | Country | Date | Events |
|---|---|---|---|---|---|
| 1st | 1994 | Ponte nelle Alpi, Venice | Italy | 13 July | 4 |
| 1st | 1995 | Valleraugue, Gard | France | 15 July | 4 |
| 2nd | 1996 | Llanberis, Wales | United Kingdom | 13 July | |
| 3rd | 1997 | Ebensee, Oberösterreich | Austria | 6 July | |
| 4th | 1998 | Sestriere, Piemonte | Italy | 15 July | |
| 5th | 1999 | Bad Kleinkirchheim, Kärnten | Austria | 4 July | |
| 6th | 2000 | Międzygórze, Dolnośląskie | Poland | 2 July | |
| 7th | 2001 | Cerklje, Gorenjska | Slovenia | 1 July | |
| 8th | 2002 | Câmara de Lobos, Madeira | Portugal | 7 July | |
| 9th | 2003 | Trento, Trentino-Alto Adige | Italy | 6 July | |
| 10th | 2004 | Korbielów, Śląskie | Poland | 4 July | |
| 11th | 2005 | Heiligenblut, Kärnten | Austria | 10 July | |
| 12th | 2006 | Úpice, Hradec Králové | Czech Republic | 9 July | |
| 13th | 2007 | Cauterets, Hautes-Pyrénées | France | 8 July | |
| 14th | 2008 | Zell am Harmersbach, Baden-Württemberg | Germany | 12 July | |
| 15th | 2009 | Telfes, Tirol | Austria | 12 July | |
| 16th | 2010 | Sapareva Banya, Kyustendil | Bulgaria | 4 July | |
| 17th | 2011 | Uludağ, Bursa | Turkey | 9 July | |
| 18th | 2012 | Pamukkale, Denizli | Turkey | 7 July | |
| 19th | 2013 | Borovets, Sofia | Bulgaria | 6 July | |
| 20th | 2014 | Gap, Hautes-Alpes | France | 12 July | |
| 21st | 2015 | Porto Moniz, Madeira | Portugal | 4 July | |
| 22nd | 2016 | Arco, Trentino | Italy | 2 July | |
| 23rd | 2017 | Kamnik, Upper Carniola | Slovenia | 8 July | |
| 24th | 2018 | Skopje | North Macedonia | 1 July | |
| 25th | 2019 | Zermatt | Switzerland | 7 July | |
| 26th | 2021 | | | | |

== Medals ==
All results at European Athletic Association web site.

=== Men ===
| Year | Gold | Time | Silver | Time | Bronze | Tim- |
|---|---|---|---|---|---|---|
| 1994 | (Italy) Andrea Agostini | 41:09 | (Italy) Lucio Fregona | 41:33 | (Italy) Fabio Ciaponi | 41:43 |
| 1995 | (Austria) Helmut Schmuck | 56:53 | (Italy) Antonio Molinari | 57:25 | (Italy) Davide Milesi | 58:00 |
| 1996 | (France) Jaime de Jesus Mendes | 1:03:16 | (France) Thierry Breuil | 1:03:32 | (Italy) Lucio Fregona | 1:04 |
| 1997 | (Austria) Helmut Schmuck | 49:46 | (Italy) Antonio Molinari | 50:48 | (Austria) Peter Schatz | 50:56 |
| 1998 | (Italy) Antonio Molinari | 53:02 | (England) Andrew Pearson | 53:44 | (Italy) Marco De Gasperi | 53:58 |
| 1999 | (Italy) Antonio Molinari | 52:17 | (France) Arnaud Fourdin | 52:34 | (England) Richard Findlow | 53:20 |
| 2000 | (Italy) Massimo Galliano | 50:22 | (England) Richard Findlow | 50:56 | (Italy) Antonio Molinari | 51:03 |
| 2001 | (Italy) Antonio Molinari | 49:47 | (Slovakia) Martin Bajcicák | 50:01 | (France) Raymond Fontaine | 50:14 |
| 2002 | (Switzerland) Alexis Gex-Fabry | 56:37 | (Italy) Marco De Gasperi | 56:55 | (Turkey) Abdülkadir Türk | 57:52 |
| 2003 | (Italy) Marco Gaiardo | 1:06:05 | (Austria) Helmut Schmuck | 1:07:13 | (Czech Republic) Róbert Krupicka | 1:07:31 |
| 2004 | (Italy) Marco De Gasperi | 44:06 | (Austria) Florian Heinzle | 45:05 | (Italy) Marco Gaiardo | 45:10 |
| 2005 | (Austria) Florian Heinzle | 1:11:36 | (Germany) Helmut Schiessl | 1:12:16 | (Italy) Marco De Gasperi | 1:12:35 |
| 2006 | (Italy) Marco Gaiardo | 57:42 | (Turkey) Selahattin Selçuk | 57:50 | (France) Julien Rancon | 57:59 |
| 2007 | (Turkey) Ahmet Arslan | 1:08:39 | (Italy) Marco De Gasperi | 1:08:50 | (Italy) Marco Gaiardo | 1:09.09 |
| 2008 | (Turkey) Ahmet Arslan | 50:01 | (Italy) Bernard Dematteis | 50:29 | (Italy) Marco De Gasperi | 50:57 |
| 2009 | (Turkey) Ahmet Arslan | 58:26 | (Italy) Marco De Gasperi | 59:09 | (Switzerland) Sébastien Epiney | 59:19 |
| 2010 | (Turkey) Ahmet Arslan | 46:14 | (Italy) Martin Dematteis | 46:40 | (Italy) Marco De Gasperi | 47:19 |
| 2011 | (Turkey) Ahmet Arslan | 58:08 | (Italy) Gabriele Abate | 58:40 | (Italy) Bernard Dematteis | 59:41 |
| 2012 | (Turkey) Ahmet Arslan | 49:46 | (Turkey) Ercan Muslu | 49:57 | (Romania) Ionut-Alin Zinca | 50:19 |
| 2013 | (Italy) Bernard Dematteis | 56:30 | (Italy) Alex Baldaccini | 57:35 | (Turkey) Ahmet Arslan | 57:47 |
| 2014 | (Italy) Bernard Dematteis | 56:10 | (Scotland) Robbie Simpson | 56:19 | (Italy) Martin Dematteis | 56:32 |
| 2015 | (Norway) Johan Bugge | 1:02:35 | (Switzerland) David Schneider | 1:02:49 | (Italy) Alex Baldaccini | 1:02:56 |
| 2016 | (Italy) Martin Dematteis | 53:33 | (Italy) Bernard Dematteis | 53:34 | (Turkey) Ahmet Arslan | 54:09 |
| 2017 | (Italy) Xavier Chevrier | 1:02:51 | (Portugal) Luis Saraiva | 1:03:34 | (Italy) Francesco Puppi | 1:03:35 |
| 2018 | (Italy) Bernard Dematteis | 46:51 | (Italy) Cesare Maestri | 47:18 | (Italy) Martin Dematteis | 47:47 |
| 2019 | (United Kingdom) Jacob Adkin | 53:21 | (Norway) Stian Øvergaard | 53:46 | (Italy) Xavier Chevrier | 54:02 |

=== Women ===
| Year | Gold | Time | Silver | Time | Bronze | Time |
|---|---|---|---|---|---|---|
| 1994 | (Italy) Nives Curti | 30:28 | (Slovakia) Anna Baloghová | 30:57 | (England) Lucy Wright | 32:17 |
| 1995 | (Switzerland) Eroica Spiess | 1:05:17 | (Switzerland) Cristina Moretti | 1:05:20 | (Switzerland) Carolina Reiber | 1:07:32 |
| 1996 | (France) Isabelle Guillot | 53:09 | (Italy) Maria Grazia Roberti | 53:22 | (Italy) Nives Curti | 53:59 |
| 1997 | (Switzerland) Eroica Spiess | 49:26 | (England) Carol Greenwood | 50:06 | (Switzerland) Isabella Crettenand-Moretti | 50:22 |
| 1998 | (Italy) Rosita Rota Gelpi | 34:58 | (Italy) Flavia Gaviglio | 35:47 | (Italy) Pierangela Baronchelli | 36:14 |
| 1999 | (Poland) Izabela Zatorska | 55:37 | (Scotland) Angela Mudge | 57:18 | (Germany) Johanna Baumgartner | 57:34 |
| 2000 | (Poland) Izabela Zatorska | 33:38 | (Germany) Birgit Sonntag | 33:53 | (Italy) Rosita Rota Gelpi | 34:17 |
| 2001 | (Russia) Svetlana Demidenko | 56:30 | (Scotland) Angela Mudge | 57:08 | (Belgium) Catherine Lallemand | 57:28 |
| 2002 | (Russia) Svetlana Demidenko | 39:59 | (Belgium) Catherine Lallemand | 41:05 | (Czech Republic) Anna Pichrtová | 42:01 |
| 2003 | (Belgium) Catherine Lallemand | 43:48 | (United Kingdom) Angela Mudge | 44:01 | (Italy) Antonella Confortola | 44:30 |
| 2004 | (Czech Republic) Anna Pichrtová | 34:50 | (Austria) Andrea Mayr | 36:27 | (Italy) Rosita Rota Gelpi | 36:43 |
| 2005 | (Austria) Andrea Mayr | 1:07:42 | (Czech Republic) Anna Pichrtová | 1:09:38 | (Switzerland) Angéline Joly | 1:10:44 |
| 2006 | (Czech Republic) Anna Pichrtová | 41:28 | (Slovenia) Mateja Kosovelj | 42:12 | (Italy) Vittoria Salvini | 43:32 |
| 2007 | (Norway) Anita Håkenstad Evertsen | 51:45 | (Czech Republic) Anna Pichrtová | 52.34 | (Norway) Kirsten Melkevik Otterbu | 52:05 |
| 2008 | (Italy) Elisa Desco | 40:00 | (France) Constance Devillers | 40:18 | (United Kingdom) Sarah Tunstall | 40:48 |
| 2009 | (Switzerland) Martina Strähl | 54:39 | (Italy) Valentina Belotti | 55:28 | (Austria) Andrea Mayr | 56:55 |
| 2010 | (France) Marie-Laure Dumergues | 39:13 | (Italy) Valentina Belotti | 39:29 | (Russia) Elena Nagovitsyna | 39:44 |
| 2011 | (Switzerland) Martina Strähl | 48:44 | (Italy) Antonella Confortola | 49:09 | (Slovenia) Lucija Krkoč | 49:25 |
| 2012 | (Switzerland) Monika Fürholz | 39:54 | (Russia) Nadezhda Leshchinskaya | 40:03 | (Czech Republic) Pavla Schorná Matyášová | 40:07 |
| 2013 | (Austria) Andrea Mayr | 51:49 | (Italy) Valentina Belotti | 52:54 | (Slovenia) Mateja Kosovelj | 53:08 |
| 2014 | (Austria) Andrea Mayr | 39:43 | (Slovenia) Mateja Kosovelj | 40:53 | (Austria) Sabine Reiner | 41:03 |
| 2015 | (Austria) Andrea Mayr | 50:40 | (Norway) Eli-Anne Dvergsdal | 53:05 | (United Kingdom) Emma Clayton | 53:36 |
| 2016 | (United Kingdom) Emily Collinge | 43:41 | (Italy) Alice Gaggi | 44:08 | (Italy) Sara Bottarelli | 44:24 |
| 2017 | (Switzerland) Maude Mathys | 49:30 | (United Kingdom) Sarah Tunstall | 50:51 | (Austria) Andrea Mayr | 51:43 |
| 2018 | (Switzerland) Maude Mathys | 52:32 | (France) Anaïs Sabrié | 56:41 | (United Kingdom) Emma Gould | 57:48 |
| 2019 | (Switzerland) Maude Mathys | 1:00:18 | (Austria) Andrea Mayr | 1:01:19 | (France) Christel Dewalle | 1:02:48 |

== See also ==
- World Mountain Running Championships
- World Long Distance Mountain Running Challenge
- NACAC Mountain Running Championships
- South American Mountain Running Championships
- Commonwealth Mountain and Ultradistance Running Championships
