= Italian Long Distance Mountain Running Championships =

- Sport: Mountain Running
- Founded: Italian Athletics Federation (FIDAL)
- First season: 2008
- Country: Italy
- Most recent champions: Cesare Maestri (men); Alice Gaggi (women)
- Most titles: 3 Gabriele Abate (men); 3 Maria Grazia Roberti (women)
- Website: FIDAL web site

The Italian Long Distance Mountain Running Championships (Italian: Campionati italiani di corsa in montagna sulle lunghe distanze) are the national championships in long-distance mountain running, organised every year by the FIDAL from 2010.

The first edition of these Italian championships, the heirs of the Italian Championship of Gran Fondo (Italian: Campionato Italiano di Gran Fondo), took place in 2008 in Trentino, while the 2009 edition, initially scheduled in September in Abruzzo, was not played. Since 2010, the competition has taken place regularly

== Description ==
Usually the national championship dispute, in the same venue, in two different distances for men and women.

== Editions and winners ==
Edition	Year	Date	Venue	Dist. men	Dist. Women	Male Champion	Female Champion	Notes
1st	2008	21 September	Martignano-Civezzano	25 km	25 km	Andrea Regazzoni	Maria Grazia Roberti	
2nd	2009	20 September	Castelsantangelo sul Nera	not held				
3rd	2010	19 September	Domodossola	21 km	19 km	Gabriele Abate	Maria Grazia Roberti	
4th	2011	25 September	Monte Bondone	22 km	22 km	Gabriele Abate	Ornella Ferrara	
5th	2012	30 September	Carovilli	21 km	21 km	Gabriele Abate	Maria Grazia Roberti	
6th	2013	19 May	Sondalo	24 km	24 km	Tadei Pivk	Elisa Desco	
7th	2014	27 July	Colere	20 km	20 km	Marco De Gasperi	Elisa Desco	
8th	2015	19 July	Malonno	21 km	21 km	Bernard Dematteis	Alice Gaggi	
9th	2016	15 May	Casto	21.5 km	21.5 km	Xavier Chevrier	Sara Bottarelli	
10th	2017	30 April	Casto	20.5 km	20.5 km	Cesare Maestri	Alice Gaggi	
11th	2018	20 May	Paratico	21 km	21 km	Alessandro Rambaldini	Alice Gaggi	
12th	2019	19 May	Casto	21 km	21 km	Martin Dematteis	Erica Ghelfi	

== See also ==
- World Long Distance Mountain Running Championships
- Italian Mountain Running Championships
