= Cesare Maestri (runner) =

Italian runner

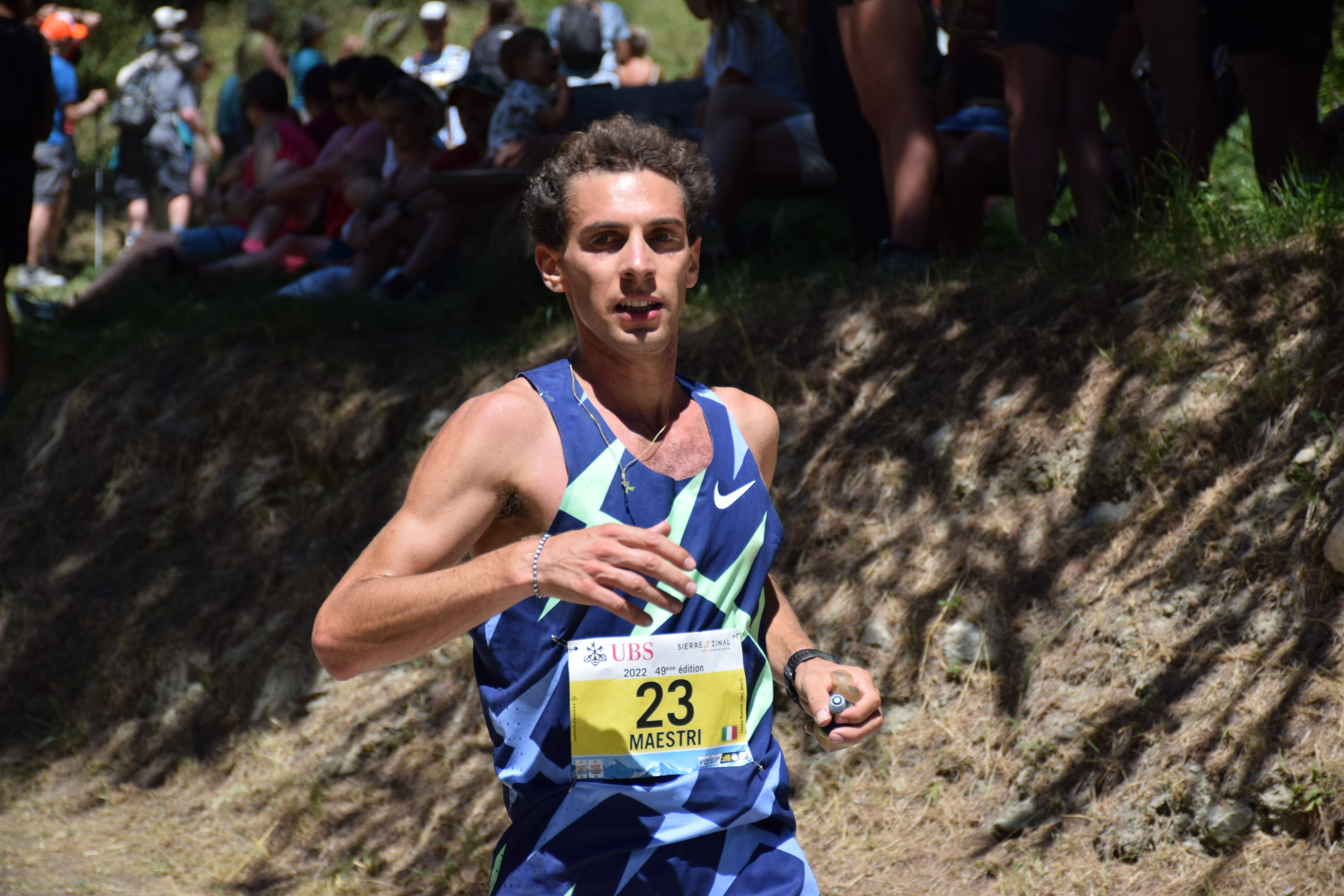
- Cesare Maestri at Sierre-Zinal 2022

Personal information
- Nationality: Italian
- Born: 12 November 1993 (age 32) Tione, Italy

Sport
- Country: Italy
- Sport: Sport of Athletics; Mountain running; Snowshoe running
- Coached by: Giordano Zanetti

Achievements and titles
- Personal best: Half marathon: 1:04:48 (2018)
Medal record
Mountain running
Event	1st	2nd	3rd
World Championships Individual	0	1	0
World Championships Team	0	1	1
European Championships Individual	0	1	0
European Championships Team	2	2	0
Total	2	5	1
Snowshoe running
Event	1st	2nd	3rd
World Championships Individual	1	0	0
Total	1	0	0

Cesare Maestri (born 12 November 1993) is an Italian male long-distance runner, mountain runner and snowshoe runner who won, at individual senior level, World Snowshoe Championships (2019) and a silver medal at the 2019 World Mountain Running Championships and 2018 European Mountain Running Championships.

== National titles ==
He won two national championships at individual senior level.

- Italian Mountain Running Championships
  - Mountain running: 2019
- Italian Long Distance Mountain Running Championships
  - Long distance mountain running: 2017

== See also ==
- Italy at the European Mountain Running Championships
