= Andi Jones =

British long-distance runner (born 1978)

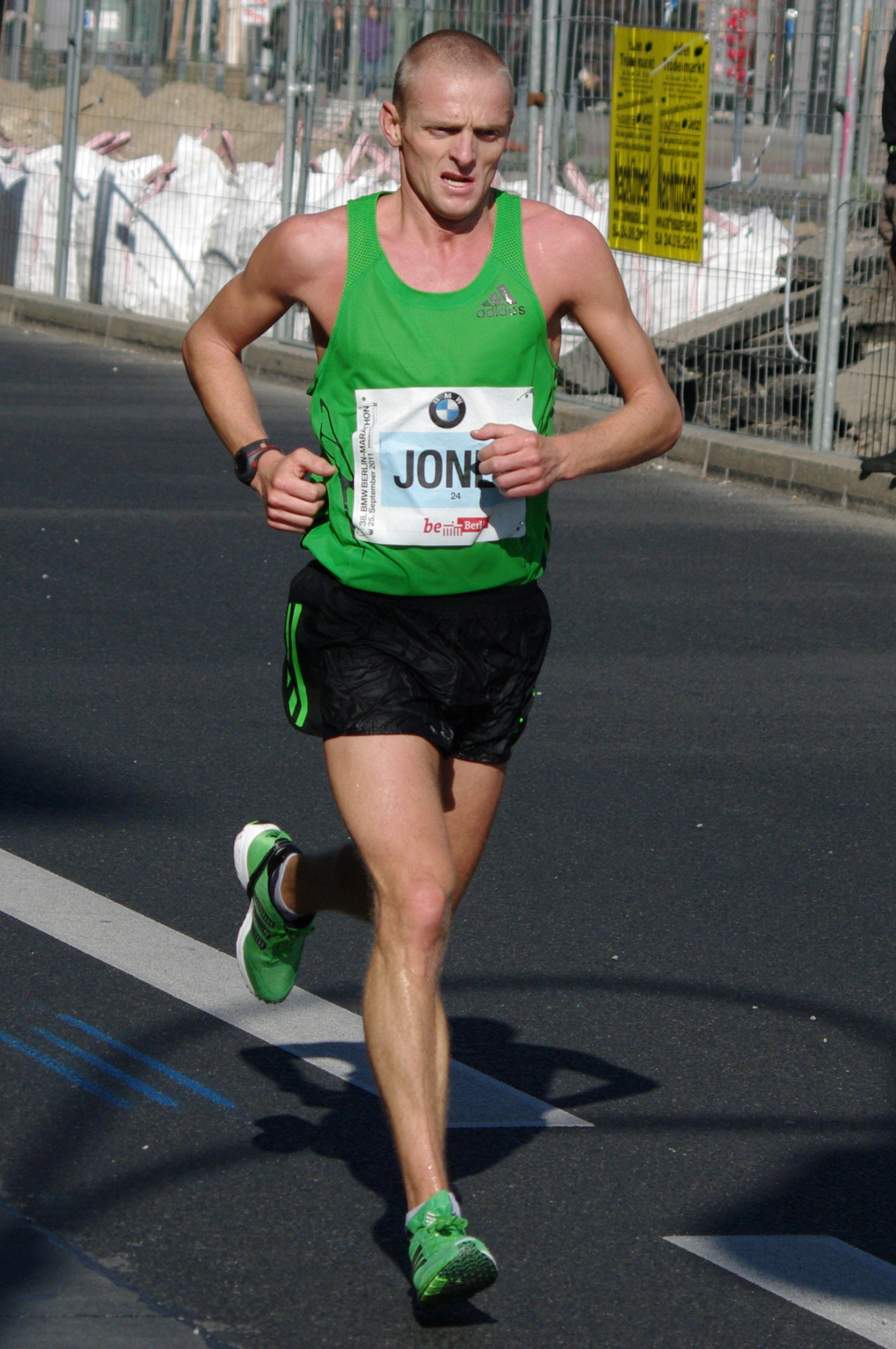
Jones running the Berlin Marathon 2011

Andrew "Andi" Jones (born 10 October 1978, in Ashton-under-Lyne) is an English athlete who specialises in road, cross country, and mountain/fell running, and has competed for England and Great Britain. In 2003, he finished fourth in the World Mountain Trophy in Alaska. Closer to home, he competes for Stockport Harriers. Although one of the UK's leading distance runners, Andi chooses to work full-time alongside his running career and was employed as head of Design and Technology at Falinge Park High School, Rochdale. In 2014, Jones emigrated to Qatar.

Andi became the first athlete for twelve years to retain the senior men's title at the 2007 English Northern Cross Country Championships at Heaton Park, Manchester. The last runner to win back-to-back crowns was Rossendale Harrier, Dave Lewis, in 1994 and 1995.

In July 2009, Jones became the first male to win the Snowdon Race four times in a row. He missed the 2010 Snowdon Race to concentrate on the European and Commonwealth Marathon Championships, but returned in 2011 to record a narrow win over Scottish athlete Murray Strain, and won for a sixth time in 2013. He finished tenth in the 2010 London Marathon, the second best performing European man after Andrew Lemoncello.

Early in his career, Jones ran for East Cheshire Harriers, later moving to Salford Harriers and then to Stockport Harriers.

Jones has also worked at Falinge Park High school as a resistance material teacher.

== Personal bests ==
- 10 km: 29:28 – Trafford (2005)
- Half marathon: 64:22 – Wilmslow (2009)
- Marathon: 2:15:20 – London (2009)

== Major achievements ==
- 2003 World Mountain Running Trophy, Alaska – 4th
- 2006 North of England Cross Country Championships – 1st
- 2006 Liverpool Half Marathon – 1st
- 2006 European Mountain Running Championships – 7th
- 2008 English National Cross Country Championships – 4th
- 2008 World Cross Country Championships – 80th
- 2008 Birmingham Half Marathon – 1st
- 2011 European Mountain Running Championships – 6th
- 2014 Greater Manchester Marathon – 1st
