= Sara Bottarelli =

Italian long-distance runner

Personal information
- National team: Italy (5 caps)
- Born: 8 October 1990 (age 35) Gardone Val Trompia, Italy

Sport
- Country: Italy
- Sport: Athletics; Mountain running
- Event: Long-distance running
- Club: Free Zone
- Coached by: Walter Bassi

Achievements and titles
- Personal best: Half marathon: 1:17:29 (2014)
Medal record
Mountain running
| Event | 1st | 2nd | 3rd |
|---|---|---|---|
| World Championships Team | 1 | 1 | 0 |
| European Championships (individual) | 0 | 0 | 1 |
| European Championships (team) | 1 | 1 | 0 |
| Total | 2 | 2 | 1 |
European Championships
| Bronze medal – third place | 2016 Arco | Individual |

Sara Bottarelli (born 8 October 1990) is an Italian female long-distance runner and mountain runner who won at individual senior level a medal at the European Mountain Running Championships (and two others with the national team) and two medals with the national team at the World Mountain Running Championships.

== Biography ==
Sara Bottarelli is the granddaughter of another Italian mountain runner, Valentina Bottarelli (born 1948).

== National titles ==
She won a national championship at individual senior level.

- Italian Long Distance Mountain Running Championships
  - Individual: 2016

== See also ==
- Italy at the World Mountain Running Championships
- Italy at the European Mountain Running Championships
