= 2011 European Mountain Running Championships =

Sports championship

- Organisers: EAA
- Edition: 10th
- Date: 10 July
- Host city: Bursa, Turkey
- Distances: 12.0 km +1,245m– Men; 8.5 km +865m– Women; 8.5 km +865m– Junior men 3.5 km +405m– Junior women

The 2011 European Mountain Running Championships were held on 10 July at Uludağ in Bursa, Turkey. They were that year's area championships for mountain running, held by the European Athletic Association in conjunction with the Turkish Athletic Federation. The competition featured four races, with senior and junior races for both men and women. A total of 221 runners from 26 nations started the competition.

The men's race was 12.0 km long and featured an ascent of 1,245 m. The women's and junior men's races were 8.5 km long comprising a rise of 865 m. The junior women's race was 3.5 km over a hill of 405 m.

Ahmet Arslan from Turkey took his fifth consecutive men's title, while Swiss Martina Strahl won the gold medal in senior women's category. Italian senior men's and senior women's teams were the champions. In the junior men's category, Turkish Nuri Kömür became the champion followed by two of his countrymen. Denisa Ionela Dragomir from Romania was the gold medalist in junior women's race. Turkish junior men's and junior women's teams took the gold medals in team ranking.

The event was dominated by the host nation Turkey, which won in total nine medals (four gold, three silver and two bronze) in three categories. It was the senior women's race, at which Turkey was not able to win any medal.

== Results ==
=== Men ===
Rank	Athlete	Country	Time (h:m:s)
Gold medal	Ahmet Arslan	Turkey	58:08
Silver medal	Gabriele Abate	Italy	58:40
Bronze medal	Bernard Dematteis	Italy	59:41
4	Süleyman Büyükbezgin	Turkey	59:56
5	Alex Baldaccini	Italy	1:00:25
6	Andi Jones	United Kingdom	1:00:39
7	Anders Kleist	Sweden	1:00:47
8	Georges Burrier	France	1:01:03

Teams
Rank	Team	Points
Gold medal	Italy (Gabriele Abate, Bernard Dematteis, Alex Baldaccini, Martin Dematteis)	12
Silver medal	Turkey	34
Bronze medal	Portugal	36
4	France	39
5	United Kingdom	67

- Totals: 78 starters, 74 finishers, 17 national teams. Jose Gaspar, who had finished third, was disqualified for a doping offence.

=== Women ===
Rank	Athlete	Country	Time (m:s)
Gold medal	Martina Strähl	Switzerland	48:44
Silver medal	Antonella Confortola	Italy	49:09
Bronze medal	Lucija Krkoc	Slovenia	49:24
4	Valentina Belotti	Italy	49:40
5	Marina Ivanova	Russia	49:57
6	Pavla Schorna	Czech Republic	50:10
7	Cristina Alexandra Frumuz	Romania	50:20
8	Bernadette Meier-Brändle	Switzerland	50:22

Teams
Rank	Team	Points
Gold medal	Italy	22
Silver medal	Russia	28
Bronze medal	Switzerland	38
4	Norway	44
5	Slovenia	62

- Totals: 57 starters, 54 finishers, 12 national teams.

=== Junior men ===
Rank	Athlete	Country	Time (m:s)
Gold medal	Nuri Kömür	Turkey	43:08
Silver medal	Sönmez Dağ	Turkey	43:12
Bronze medal	Murat Orak	Turkey	43:40
4	Szabolcs Istvan Gheorgy	Romania	45:27
5	Anton Palzer	Germany	45:41

Teams
Rank	Team	Points
Gold medal	Turkey	6
Silver medal	Czech Republic	39
Bronze medal	Italy	43

- Totals: 54 starters, 54 finishers, 12 national teams.

=== Junior women ===
Rank	Athlete	Country	Time (m:s)
Gold medal	Denisa Ionela Dragomir	Romania	21:43
Silver medal	Yasemin Can	Turkey	22:08
Bronze medal	Sevilay Eytemis	Turkey	22:16
4	Susanne Mair	Austria	22:23
5	Rebeca Rus	Romania	23:08

Teams
Rank	Team	Points
Gold medal	Turkey	5
Silver medal	Romania	6
Bronze medal	Austria	16

- Totals: 32 starters, 32 finishers, 10 national teams.

== Participation ==
A total of 26 nations had athletes, which took part in the 2011 Championships.

- Albania
- Austria
- Belgium
- Bulgaria
- Croatia
- Czech Republic
- France
- Germany
- Hungary
- Ireland
- Israel
- Italy
- Liechtenstein
- Macedonia
- Norway
- Poland
- Portugal
- Romania
- Russia
- Slovenia
- Spain
- Sweden
- Switzerland
- Turkey
- Ukraine
- United Kingdom
