= 1994 European Mountain Running Trophy =

- Organisers: FIDAL
- Edition: 1st (unofficial)
- Date: 3 July
- Host city: Ponte nelle Alpi
- Events: 2
- Official website: fidal.it

The 1994 European Mountain Running Trophy was held in Ponte nelle Alpi, Italy. It was the first European international competition for the sport and preceded the launching of an official European competition by the World Mountain Running Association the following year. It featured a men's race and a women's race, each of which had an individual and team component. The host nation Italy won all four titles, with Andrea Agostini and Nives Curti winning the individual races.

== Results ==
=== Individual ===
Men
Rank	Runner	Nation	Time
1st place, gold medalist(s)	Andrea Agostini	Italy	41:09
2nd place, silver medalist(s)	Lucio Fregona	Italy	41:33
3rd place, bronze medalist(s)	Fabio Ciaponi	Italy	41:43

Women
Rank	Runner	Nation	Time
1st place, gold medalist(s)	Nives Curti	Italy	30:28
2nd place, silver medalist(s)	Anna Baloghová	Slovakia	30:57
3rd place, bronze medalist(s)	Lucy Wright	England	32:17

=== Team ===
Men
Rank	Nation	Points
1st place, gold medalist(s)	Italy; Andrea Agostini; Lucio Fregona; Fabio Ciaponi	6
2nd place, silver medalist(s)	England; Mark Croasdale; Craig Roberts; Ian Holmes	16
3rd place, bronze medalist(s)	Slovenia; Franci Teraž; Boštjan Novak; Izidor Berčić	39

Women
Rank	Nation	Points
1st place, gold medalist(s)	Italy; Nives Curti; Valeria Colpo	5
2nd place, silver medalist(s)	Slovakia; Anna Baloghová; Andrea Bersová	11
3rd place, bronze medalist(s)	England; Lucy Wright; Andrea Priestley	13
