= 2008 European Mountain Running Championships =

- Organisers: EAA
- Edition: 7th
- Date: 12 July
- Host city: Zell am Harmersbach, Germany
- Events: 4
- Distances: 12 km – Men; 8.75 km – Women; 8.75 km – U20 men 4 km – U20 women
- Participation: 227 athletes from 25 nations

The 2008 European Mountain Running Championships were held on 12 July in Zell am Harmersbach, Germany. Held by the European Athletic Association, the competition was held on an up- and downhill course in the Black Forest. The championships featured 227 athletes representing 25 nations.

The championships comprised four races: the men's race which was 12 km long with an 804 m ascent and 714 m descent, the women's and under-20s men's competitions over 8.75 km and containing a 566 m ascent and 476 m descent, and finally the under-20s women's race which was competed over 4 km with a rise and fall of 238 m.

Ahmet Arslan defended his title in the men's senior race while Elisa Desco took the gold medal in the women's race. Bernard Dematteis headed home Italy to the senior men's team gold medal and Great Britain won the women's team gold, with bronze medallist Sarah Tunstall the nation's best finisher. The junior men's competition was largely a Turkish affair, with Hasan Pak winning gold and leading a 1-2-3 for his country. The women's junior race was won by Mariya Bykova who, along with Tatyana Prorokova, took the team gold.

== Results ==
=== Men's senior race ===
Rank	Athlete	Country	Time (m:s)
Gold medal	Ahmet Arslan	Turkey	50:01
Silver medal	Bernard Dematteis	Italy	50:29
Bronze medal	Marco De Gasperi	Italy	50:57
4	Jose Gaspar	Portugal	51:09
5	Julien Rancon	France	51:13
6	Marco Gaiardo	Italy	51:22
7	Gabriele Abate	Italy	51:33
8	Mitja Kosovelj	Slovenia	51:39
9	Javier Crespo	Spain	51:46
10	Cristofol Castañer	Spain	51:51

Teams
Rank	Team	Points
Gold medal	Italy	11
Silver medal	Spain	32
Bronze medal	France	32
4	Turkey	32
5	Portugal	41

- Total participants: 82 runners and 19 teams.

=== Women's senior race ===
Rank	Athlete	Country	Time (m:s)
Gold medal	Elisa Desco	Italy	40:00
Silver medal	Constance Devillers	France	40:18
Bronze medal	Sarah Tunstall	United Kingdom	40:48
4	Mateja Kosovelj	Slovenia	41:20
5	Victoria Wilkinson	United Kingdom	41:28
6	Bernadette Meier-Brändle	Switzerland	41:31
7	Isabelle Guillot	France	41:49
8	Maria Grazia Roberti	Italy	41:54
9	Katie Ingram	United Kingdom	42:00
10	Milka Mikhaylova	Bulgaria	42:04

Teams
Rank	Team	Points
Gold medal	United Kingdom	17
Silver medal	France	21
Bronze medal	Italy	22
4	Slovenia	57
5	Czech Republic	61

- Total participants: 71 runners and 17 teams.

=== Men's under-20s race ===
Rank	Athlete	Country	Time (m:s)
Gold medal	Hasan Pak	Turkey	35:23
Silver medal	Alper Demir	Turkey	35:58
Bronze medal	Emrah Akalın	Turkey	36:09
4	Renè Stöckert	Germany	36:27
5	Adem Karataş	Turkey	36:46
6	Xavier Chevrier	Italy	37:04
7	Marc Tolstikhin	Russia	37:16
8	Candide Pralong	Switzerland	37:18
9	Luca Re	Italy	37:39
10	Peter Oblak	Slovenia	37:44

Teams
Rank	Team	Points
Gold medal	Turkey	6
Silver medal	Italy	31
Bronze medal	Russia	32
4	Switzerland	52
5	Austria	54

- Total participants: 44 runners and 10 teams.

=== Women's under-20s race ===
Rank	Athlete	Country	Time (m:s)
Gold medal	Mariya Bykova	Russia	18:45
Silver medal	Esra Gullu	Turkey	18:48
Bronze medal	Tatyana Prorokova	Russia	18:54
4	Natalia Strzelecka	Poland	19:02
5	Hannah Bateson	United Kingdom	19:03
6	Cansu Turan	Turkey	19:10
7	Hülya Ongun	Turkey	19:15
8	Kateřina Beroušková	Czech Republic	19:18
9	Anastasiya Mikhaylova	Russia	19:20
10	Helen Wolfson	Israel	19:26

Teams
Rank	Team	Points
Gold medal	Russia	4
Silver medal	Turkey	8
Bronze medal	United Kingdom	17
4	Italy	25
5	Czech Republic	28

- Total participants: 30 runners and 10 teams.
