= Valentina Belotti =

Italian athletics competitor

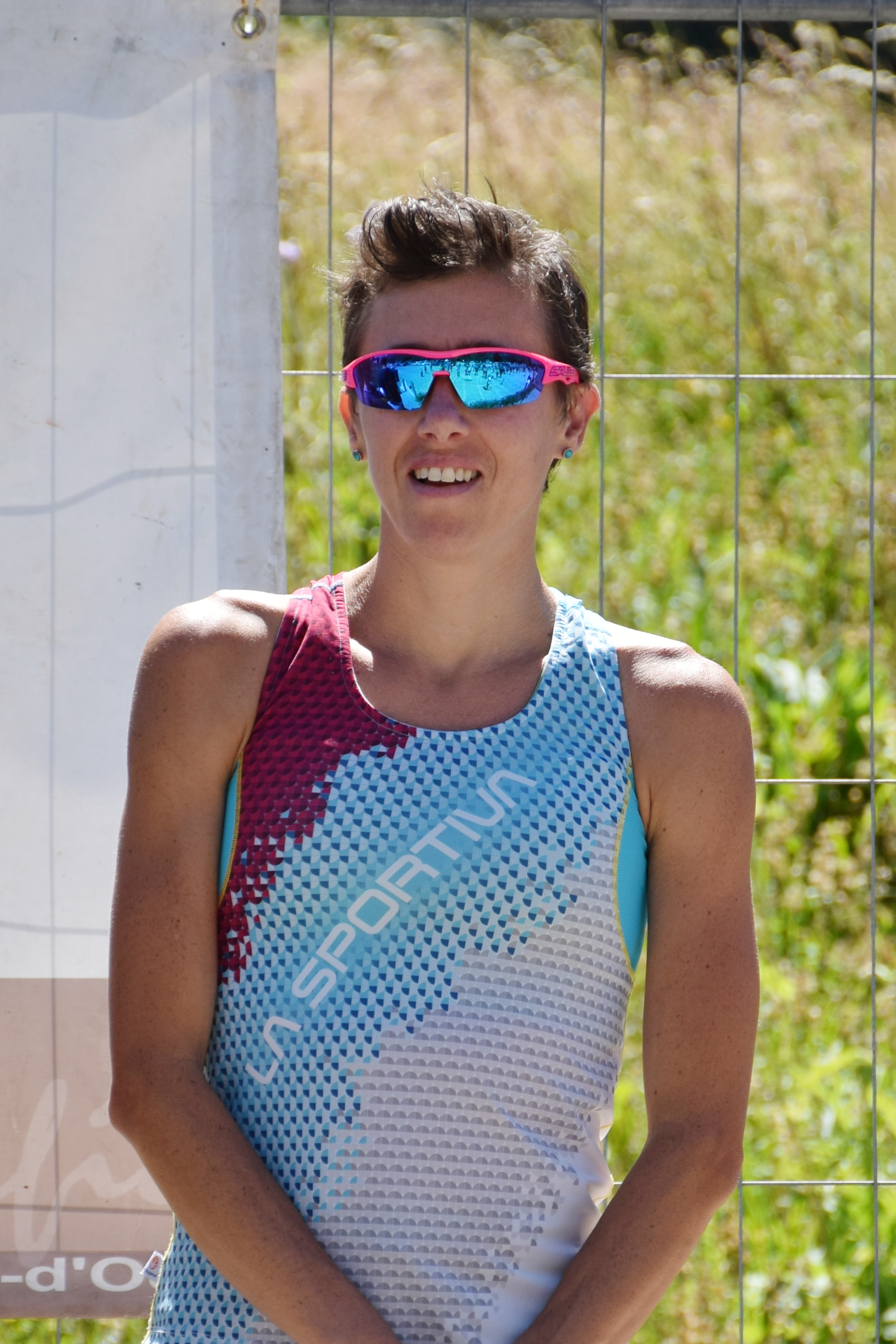
- Valentina Belotti in 2020

Personal information
- Nationality: Italian
- Born: 4 April 1980 (age 46) Edolo
- Height: 1.65 m (5 ft 5 in)
- Weight: 51 kg (112 lb)

Sport
- Country: Italy (22 caps)
- Sport: Mountain running
- Club: Atletica Alta Valtellina
- Coached by: Renato Gotti

Achievements and titles
- Personal best: Marathon: 2:18:20 (2016)
Medal record
Mountain running
World Championships
Gold medal – first place	2009 Madesimo	Individual
Silver medal – second place	2010 Sapareva	Individual
Silver medal – second place	2012 Kamnik	Individual
Silver medal – second place	2016 Temù	Individual
European Championships
Silver medal – second place	2009 Telfes	Individual
Silver medal – second place	2010 Sapareva Banya	Individual
Silver medal – second place	2013 Borovets	Individual

Valentina Belotti (born 4 April 1980) is an Italian female mountain runner, world champion at the 2009 World Mountain Running Championships.

== Biography ==
At individual senior level she won 4 medals (1 gold and 3 silver) at the World Mountain Running Championships and 3 (all silver) at the European Mountain Running Championships. She also competed at three editions of the IAAF World Cross Country Championships at senior level (2002, 2004, 2007). She won also six senior national championships.

== National titles ==
- Italian Mountain Running Championships
  - Mountain running: 2010, 2016 (2)
- Italian Vertical Kilometer Championships
  - Vertical kilometer: 2013, 2016, 2017 (3)
