= Flavia Gaviglio =

Italian mountain runner

Personal information
- Nationality: Italian
- Born: 8 September 1963 (age 62)

Sport
- Country: Italy
- Sport: Athletics; Mountain running

Achievements and titles
- Personal best: Half marathon: 1:15:27 (2003)
Medal record
Mountain running
Event	1st	2nd	3rd
World Championships Individual	0	0	0
World Championships Team	3	3	0
European Championships Individual	0	1	0
European Championships Team
Total	3	4	0
European Championships
Silver medal – second place	1998 Sestriere	Individual

Flavia Gaviglio (born 8 September 1963) is a former Italian female mountain runner, silver medal at the 1998 European Mountain Running Championships.

== Biography ==
At individual senior level she won 6 medals with the national team) at the World Mountain Running Championships. She competed at four editions of the IAAF World Cross Country Championships at senior level (1994, 1998, 2001, 2005).

== Team results ==
- World Mountain Running Championships (6 medals)
  - (gold) 1999, 2001, 2004 (3)
  - (silver) 1996, 1997, 2000 (3)

== National titles ==
- Italian Mountain Running Championships
  - 1996, 2001, 2004 (3)
