= Elisa Desco =

Italian athletics competitor

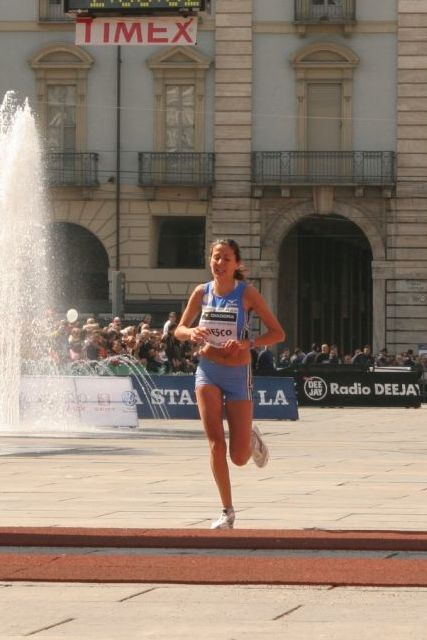

Personal information
- Nationality: Italian
- Born: 30 May 1982 (age 44)

Sport
- Country: Italy
- Sport: Mountain running Skyrunning
Medal record
Mountain running
World Championships
Bronze medal – third place	2008 Crans Montana	Individual
Bronze medal – third place	2013 Krynica-Zdrój	Individual
European Championships
Gold medal – first place	2008 Zell am Harmersbach	Individual
Skyrunning
World Championships
Gold medal – first place	2014 Chamonix	SkyMarathon
Bronze medal – third place	2016 Lleida	SkyMarathon

Elisa Desco (born 30 May 1982) is an Italian female sky runner and mountain runner, world champion at the 2014 Skyrunning World Championships held in Chamonix, and European champion at the 2008 European Mountain Running Championships held in Zell am Harmersbach.

== Biography ==
She was also world champion at individual senior level she won 7 medals (1 gold individual and 6 with the national team) at the 2008 World Mountain Running Championships but was disqualified for doping.

Her partner is the Italian mountain running champion Marco De Gasperi. They live in Bormio with their two daughters, Lidia (2011) and Cecilia (2017).

== Achievements ==
Skyrunning
Year	Competition	Venue	Position	Event	Time	Notes
2014	World Championships	(France) Chamonix	1st	SkyMarathon (42 km)	3:53:33	
2016	World Championships	(Spain) Lleida	3rd	SkyMarathon (42 km)	4:46:43	

== Team results ==
- World Mountain Running Championships
  - (gold) 2005, 2013, 2014 (3)

== National titles ==
- Italian Mountain Running Championships
  - Mountain running: 2008, 2013, 2015, 2018, 2019 (5)
- Italian Long Distance Mountain Running Championships
  - Long distance mountain running: 2013, 2014 (2)
