= 2012 European Mountain Running Championships =

2012 competition held in Turkey

- Organisers: EAA
- Edition: 11th
- Date: 7 July
- Host city: Denizli, Turkey
- Distances: 12.2 km +700m– Men; 8.3 km +470m– Women; 8.3 km +470m– Junior men 4.4 km +240m– Junior women

The 2012 European Mountain Running Championships were held on 7 July at Pamukkale in Denizli, Turkey. They were that year's area championships for mountain running, held by the European Athletic Association in conjunction with the Turkish Athletic Federation. The competition featured four races, with senior and junior races for both men and women. A total of 163 runners from 21 nations started the competition.

The men's race was 12.2 km long and featured an ascent of 700 m. The women's and junior men's races were 8.3 km long comprising a rise of 470 m. The junior women's race was 4.4 km over a hill of 240 m.

Ahmet Arslan from Turkey took his sixth consecutive men's title, while Swiss Monika Furholz won the gold medal in senior women's category. Italian senior men's and British senior women's teams were the champions. In the junior men's category, Turkish Ahmet Özrek became the champion. Annabel Mason from United Kingdom was the gold medalist in junior women's race. Turkish junior men's and junior women's teams took the gold medals in team ranking.

The event was dominated by the host nation Turkey, which won in total eight medals (four gold, three silver and one bronze) in six categories. It was the senior women's race, at which Turkey was not able to win any medal.

== Results ==
=== Men ===
Rank	Athlete	Country	Time (h:m:s)
Gold medal	Ahmet Arslan	Turkey	49:46
Silver medal	Ercan Muslu	Turkey	49:57
Bronze medal	Ionut Zinca	Romania	50:19
4	Gabriele Abate	Italy	50:33
5	Marco De Gasperi	Italy	50:49
6	Julien Rancon	France	51:00
7	Xavier Chevrier	Italy	51:23
8	Simon Lechleitner	Austria	51:26

Teams
Rank	Team	Points
Gold medal	Italy	16
Silver medal	Turkey	19
Bronze medal	France	48
4	Czech Republic	56
5	Spain	60
6	Slovenia	64
7	United Kingdom	65
8	Portugal	69

- Totals: 49 starters

=== Women ===
Rank	Athlete	Country	Time (m:s)
Gold medal	Monika Furholz	Switzerland	39:54
Silver medal	Nadezhda Leschinskaia	Russia	40:03
Bronze medal	Pavla Schorna Matyasova	Czech Republic	40:07
4	Mary Wilkinson	United Kingdom	40:10
5	Veronica Perez	Spain	40:21
6	Emma Clayton	United Kingdom	40:27
7	Antonella Confortola	Italy	40:54
8	Sarah McCormack	Ireland	40:55

Teams
Rank	Team	Points
Gold medal	Great Britain	20
Silver medal	Italy	30
Bronze medal	Russia	30
4	Czech Republic	31
5	Spain	64
6	Romania	65
7	France	78
8	Ireland	85

- Totals: 47

=== Junior men ===
Rank	Athlete	Country	Time (m:s)
Gold medal	Ahmet Özrek	Turkey	35:18
Silver medal	Anton Palzer	Germany	36:26
Bronze medal	Vitaly Lagushin	Russia	36:42
4	Rodion Reshetnikov	Russia	36:52
5	Yetkin Tunçtan	Turkey	37:04

Teams
Rank	Team	Points
Gold medal	Turkey	17
Silver medal	Russia	28
Bronze medal	Czech Republic	29

- Totals: 39 starters

=== Junior women ===
Rank	Athlete	Country	Time (m:s)
Gold medal	Annabel Mason	United Kingdom	20:25
Silver medal	Sevilay Eytemis	Turkey	21:14
Bronze medal	Çeşminaz Yılmaz	Turkey	21:45
4	Melanie Hyder	United Kingdom	22:25
5	Marinela Nineva	Bulgaria	22:31

Teams
Rank	Team	Points
Gold medal	Turkey	5
Silver medal	United Kingdom	5
Bronze medal	Bulgaria	12

- Totals: 28 starters

== Medal table ==
Rank	Country	Gold	Silver	Bronze	Total
1	Turkey	4	3	1	8
2	United Kingdom	2	1		3
3	Italy	1	2		3
4	Switzerland	1			1
5	Russia		1	2	3
6	Germany		1		1
7	Bulgaria			1	1
7	Czech Republic			1	1
7	France			1	1
7	Romania			1	1
7	Slovenia			1	1
Total		8	8	8	24

== Participation ==
A total of 21 nations had athletes, which took part in the 2012 Championships.

- Albania
- Austria
- Azerbaijan
- Bulgaria
- Croatia
- Czech Republic
- France
- Germany
- Ireland
- Israel
- Italy
- Poland
- Portugal
- Romania
- Russia
- Slovenia
- Spain
- Switzerland
- Turkey
- Ukraine
- United Kingdom
