= Nives Curti =

Italian long-distance runner

Personal information
- National team: Italy (18 caps in 1989-2002)
- Born: 1 September 1969 (age 56) Domodossola, Italy

Sport
- Country: Italy
- Sport: Athletics; Mountain running
- Events: Long-distance running; Cross-country running

Achievements and titles
- Personal bests: Half marathon: 1:11:50 (2001); Marathon: 2:28:59 (2001)
Medal record
Mountain running
Event	1st	2nd	3rd
World Championships Individual	0	0	1
World Championships Team	1	1	1
European Championships Individual	1	0	1
European Championships Team	2	0	1
Total	4	1	4
World Mountain Running Championships
Bronze medal – third place	1995 Edinburgh	Individual
European Mountain Running Championships
Gold medal – first place	1994 Ponte nelle Alpi	Individual
Bronze medal – third place	1996 Llanberis	Individual

Nives Curti (born 1 September 1969) is a former Italian female long-distance runner and mountain runner who competed at individual senior level at the IAAF World Women's Road Race Championships and at the IAAF World Cross Country Championships (2001, 2002).

== Biography ==
She won several medals at the World and European championships in the mountain running, three of these at individual level.

== Achievements ==
Year	Competition	Venue	Position	Event	Time	Notes
Mountain running
1993	World Championships	(France) Gap	4th	Individual	38:05	
1993	World Championships	(France) Gap	1st	Team	35 pts	
1994	European Championships	(Italy) Ponte nelle Alpi	1st	Individual	30:28	
1994	European Championships	(Italy) Ponte nelle Alpi	1st	Team	5 pts	
1994	World Championships	(Germany) Berchtesgaden	4th	Individual	41:28	
1994	World Championships	(Germany) Berchtesgaden	3rd	Team	35 pts	
1995	European Championships	(France) Valleraugue	6th	Individual	1:09:34	
1995	European Championships	(France) Valleraugue	3rd	Team	14 pts	
1995	World Championships	(United Kingdom) Edinburgh	3rd	Individual	37:43	
1995	World Championships	(United Kingdom) Edinburgh	2nd	Team	20 pts	
1996	European Championships	(United Kingdom) Llanberis	3rd	Individual	53:59	
1996	European Championships	(United Kingdom) Llanberis	1st	Team	5 pts	

== National titles ==
She won four national championships at individual senior level.

- Italian Cross Country Championships
  - Long race: 1989
- Italian Mountain Running Championships
  - Individual: 1993, 1994, 1995

== See also ==
- Italy at the European Mountain Running Championships
