= Antonio Molinari (runner) =

Italian mountain runner

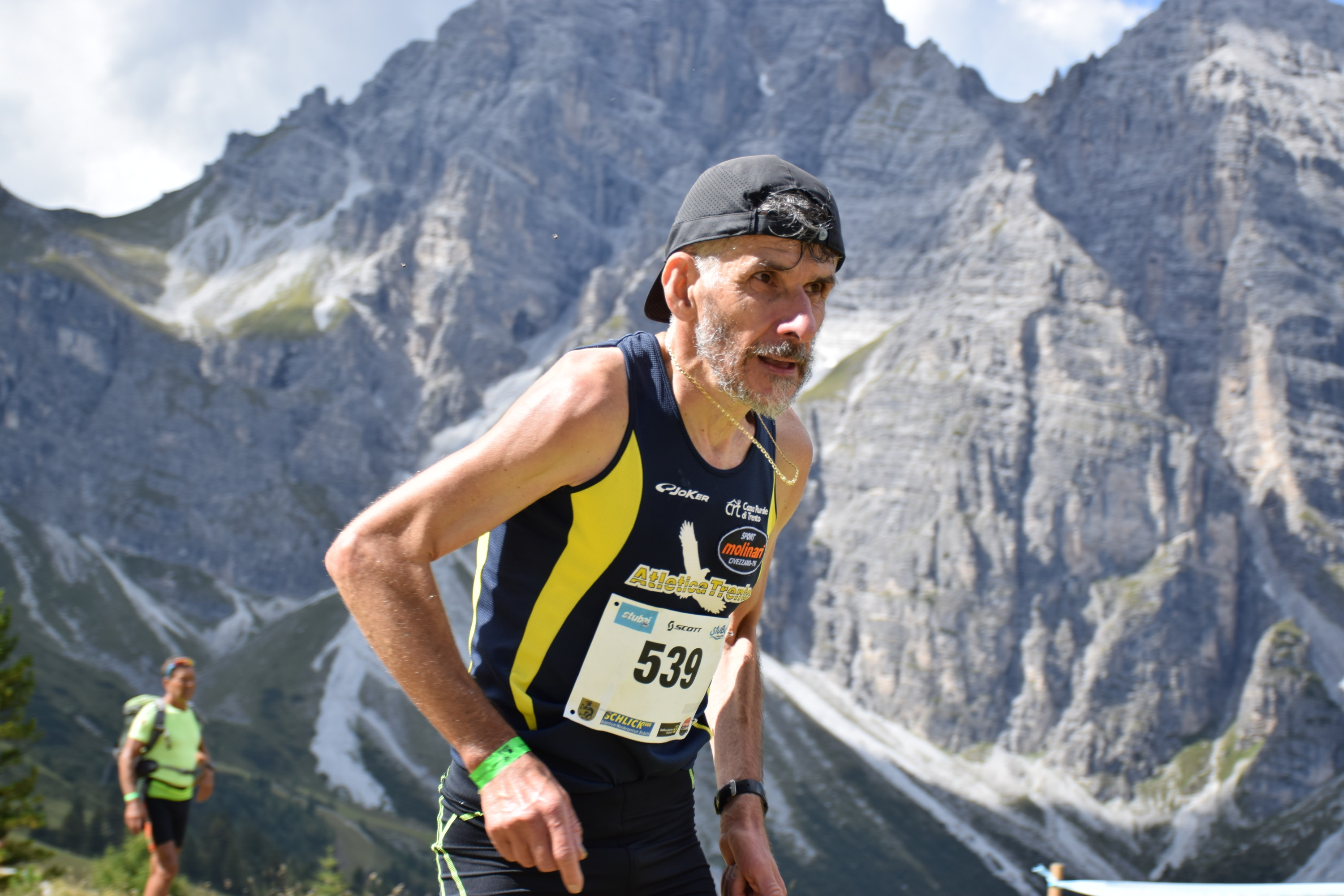
- Antonio Molinari at the 2021 World Masters Mountain Running Championships

Personal information
- Nicknames: Suede of Civezzano (Camoscio di Civezzano)
- Nationality: Italian
- Born: 13 February 1967 (age 59) Civezzano

Sport
- Country: Italy (29 caps)
- Sport: Mountain running Masters athletics
- Club: Atletica Trento

Achievements and titles
- World finals: 2 World Cup: 1998; 2000
Medal record
Mountain running
Event	1st	2nd	3rd
World Championships Individual	1	2	0
World Championships Team	12	1	0
European Championships Individual	3	2	1
European Championships Team	6	0	0
Total	22	5	1
Masters athletics
Event	1st	2nd	3rd
World Championships Individual	1	2	1
World Championships Team	2	1	0
Total	3	3	2

Antonio Molinari (born 13 February 1967) is a former Italian male mountain runner (than masters athlete), thirteen-time world champion (one at individual level and twelve with the national team), at the World Mountain Running Championships.

== Biography ==
With 12 participations in the World championships, he is the second Italian after Marco De Gasperi with 15. He also won five national championships at individual senior level.

== National titles ==
- Italian Mountain Running Championships
  - Mountain running: 1997, 1998, 1999, 2000, 2001 (5)

== See also ==
- Italy at the European Mountain Running Championships
