= Ahmet Arslan (athlete) =

Turkish long-distance runner (born 1986)

Personal information
- Nationality: Turkish
- Born: 1986 (age 39–40) Gazipaşa, Antalya, Turkey

Sport
- Country: Turkey
- Sport: Mountain running
- Club: Red Bull
- Coached by: Metin Sazak
- Retired: January 2020
Medal record
Mountain Running
Representing Turkey
World Grand Prix
Gold medal – first place	2010 Šmarna gora	Senior
World Championships
Bronze medal – third place	2016 Sapareva Banya	Senior
Silver medal – second place	2011 Tirana	Senior
World Trophy
Bronze medal – third place	2008 Sierre	Senior
European Championships
Bronze medal – third place	2013 Borovets	Senior
Gold medal – first place	2012 Denizli	Senior
Gold medal – first place	2011 Bursa	Senior
Gold medal – first place	2010 Sapareva Banya	Senior
Gold medal – first place	2009 Telfes im Stubai	Senior
Gold medal – first place	2008 Zell am Harmersbach	Senior
Gold medal – first place	2007 Cauterets	Senior

Ahmet Arslan (born 1986 in Gazipaşa, Antalya) is a retired long-distance runner from Turkey who competed in mountain running. He is a seven time successive champion of European Mountain Running Championships.

== Biography ==
He was born in 1986 to a farmer's family in Gazipaşa of Antalya Province in southern Turkey. Ahmet Arslan has seven siblings. He completed his primary and secondary education in his hometown. After the high school, he attended Adnan Menderes University in Aydın and graduated 2009 with a degree in physical education and sports.

Ahmet Arslan started with athletics in 2000 at the high school. He had to discontinue sports in 2004 for one year. After 2005, he begin intensive running training, especially after meeting his coach Metin Sazak, a former athlete. He switched to mountain running from cross-country running. That year, he took part in the national mountain running championships and became successful although he competed in the seniors category despite his young age. Admitted to the national team, he participated at his first international events like the European Mountain Championships and the World Mountain Running Trophy and gained international experience.

From 2007 on, Ahmet Arslan won the European championships seven times in a row. In 2010, he won the gold medal also at the WMRA Grand Prix. He was the silver medallist at the 2011 World Mountain Running Championships, coming second behind American Max King. In the absence of the American, he won the continental title at the 2011 European Mountain Running Championships held in Turkey. He won that year's WMRA Grand Prix series. He began 2012 with a win at the Montée du Grand Ballon race. He has won the Red Bull 400 several times between 2011 and 2019. Since mountain running sport is not recognized as an Olympic sports branch, he is complaining about not finding a sponsor for his active sports career.

He also coaches her spouse Yasemin Can Arslan, a long-distance runner. Eraly January 2020, the Red Bull athlete announced that he retired from active sport.

== Achievements ==
Year	Event	Host	Rank
Junior men's
2005	21st World Mountain Running Trophy	New Zealand, Wellington	4th
Senior men's
2007	6th European Championships	France, Cauterets	1st place, gold medalist(s)
2008	7th European Championships	Germany, Zell am Harmersbach	1st place, gold medalist(s)
2008	24th World Mountain Running Trophy	Switzerland, Sierre	(bronze)
2009	8th European Championships	Austria, Telfes im Stubai	1st place, gold medalist(s)
2010	9th European Championships	Bulgaria, Sapareva Banya	(gold)
2010	WMRA Grand Prix	Slovenia, Šmarna gora	(gold)
2010	26th WMRA World Championships	Slovenia, Kamnik	7th
2011	6th Antalya Marathon	Turkey, Antalya	1st place, gold medalist(s)
2011	10th European Championships	Turkey, Bursa	(gold)
2011	27th World Championships	Albania, Tirana	2nd place, silver medalist(s)
2011	1st Red Bull 400	Austria Bad Mitterndorf	1st place, gold medalist(s)
2012	11th European Championships	Turkey, Denizli	(gold)
2012	3rd Red Bull 400	Slovenia Planica	(gold) |-
2013	4th Red Bull 400	Slovenia Planica	2nd place, silver medalist(s)
2013	5th Red Bull 400	Austria Tauplitz Bad Mitterndorf	1st place, gold medalist(s)
2013	12th European Championships	Bulgaria, Borovets	(bronze)
2014|-	7th Red Bull 400	Austria Tauplitz Bad Mitterndorf	1st place, gold medalist(s)
2014|-	13th European Championships	France, Hautes-Alpes	8th
2015	12th Red Bull 400	Czech Republic, Harrachov	1st place, gold medalist(s)
2015	13th Red Bull 400	Austria, Bischofshofen	1st place, gold medalist(s)
2015	14th Red Bull 400	Slovenia, Planica	1st place, gold medalist(s)
15th Red Bull 400	United States, Park City	1st place, gold medalist(s)	
2016	16th Red Bull 400	Kazakhstan, Almaty	1st place, gold medalist(s)
2016	18th Red Bull 400	Germany, Titisee-Neustadt	(gold)
2016	22nd Red Bull 400	Slovenia, Planica	1st place, gold medalist(s)
2016	32nd World Championships	Bulgaria, Sapareva Banya	3rd place, bronze medalist(s)
2017	24th Red Bull 400	Kazakhstan, Almaty	1st place, gold medalist(s)
2017	25th Red Bull 400	Turkey, Erzurum	1st place, gold medalist(s)
2017	31st Red Bull 400	Germany, Titisee-Neustadt	1st place, gold medalist(s)
2018	46th Red Bull 400	Germany, Titisee-Neustadt	1st place, gold medalist(s)
2019	54th Red Bull 400	Kazakhstan, Almaty	1st place, gold medalist(s)

== Awards ==
- In July 2011, Ahmet Arslan was awarded the title European Athlete of the Month.
