= Svetlana Demidenko =

Russian athletics competitor

Personal information
- Full name: Svetlana Gennadievna Semova Demidenko
- Nationality: Russian
- Born: 16 February 1976 (age 50) Arzamas

Sport
- Country: Russia
- Sport: Athletics; Mountain running
- Event: Long-distance running

Achievements and titles
- Personal bests: Half Marathon: 1:11:20 (2002); Marathon: 2:29:56 (2002)
Medal record
Event	1st	2nd	3rd
World Championships Individual	1	0	0
European Championships Individual	2	0	0
Total	3	0	0

Svetlana Demidenko (née Semova, born 16 February 1976) is a Russian female long-distance runner and mountain runner who won 2002 World Mountain Running Championships and two European Mountain Running Championships (2001, 2002). In 2004, she won the Istanbul Marathon.
