= Korbielów =

- Village
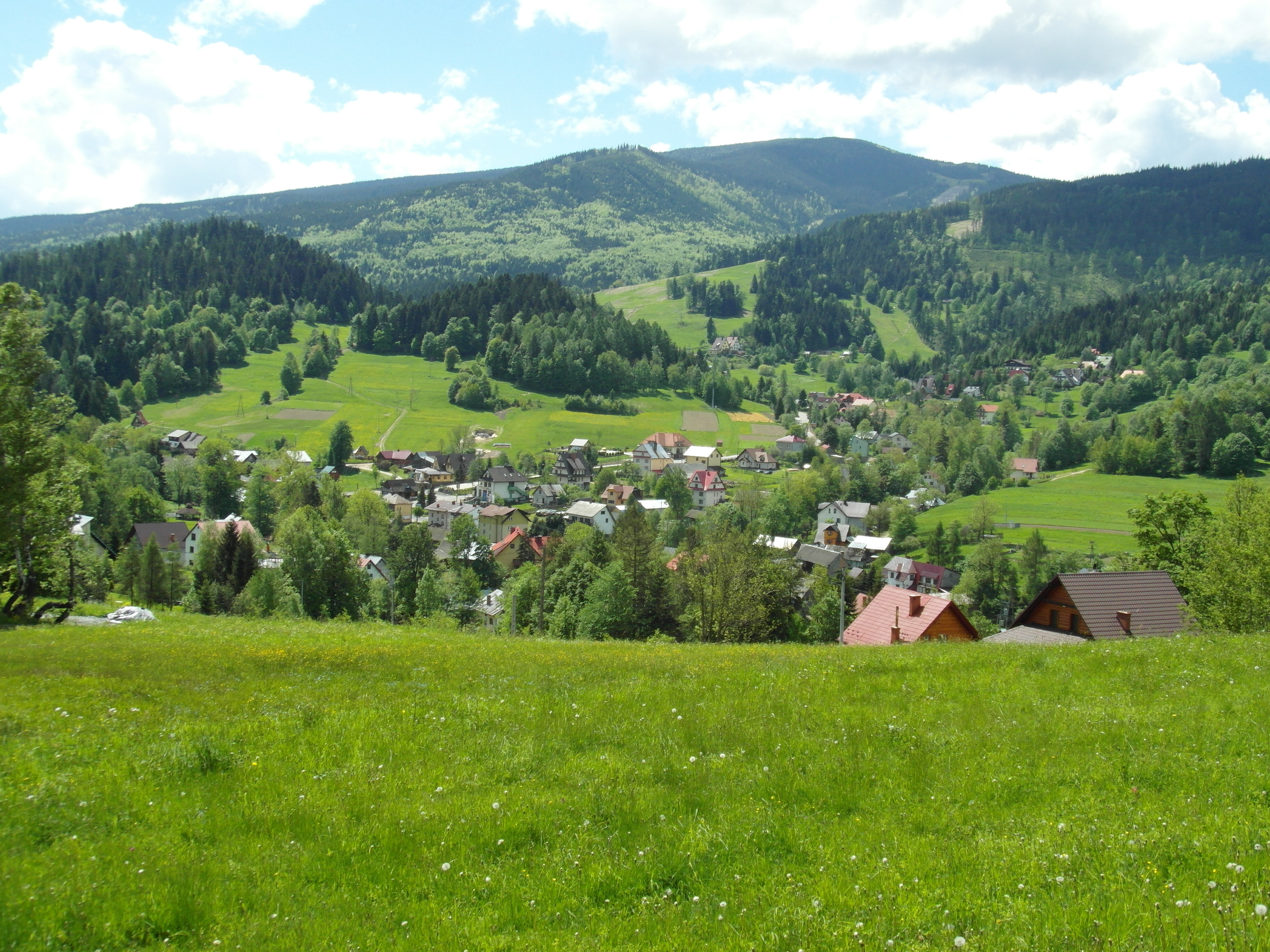

- Location within Poland
- Coordinates: 49°34′27″N 19°20′33″E
- Country: Poland
- Voivodeship: Silesian
- County: Żywiec
- Gmina: Jeleśnia
- Population: 1,191

Korbielów [kɔrˈbjɛluf] is a village in the administrative district of Gmina Jeleśnia, within Żywiec County, Silesian Voivodeship, in southern Poland, near the border with Slovakia.
