= Alex Baldaccini =

Italian mountain runner

Personal information
- Full name: Alessandro Baldaccini
- Nationality: Italian
- Born: 3 April 1988 (age 38) San Giovanni Bianco

Sport
- Country: Italy
- Sport: Mountain running Snowshoe running Athletics
- Event(s): Long-distance running Cross-country running

Achievements and titles
- Personal best: Half marathon: 1:08:13 (2013)
Medal record
Event	1st	2nd	3rd
World MR Championships	2	3	0
European MR Championships	3	2	1
European Cross Country C'hips	0	0	1
World Snowshoe Championships	1	0	0
Total	6	5	2
Mountain running
World Championships
Gold medal – first place	2011 Tirana	Team
Gold medal – first place	2015 Betws-y-Coed	Team
Silver medal – second place	2012 Ponte di Legno	Team
Silver medal – second place	2014 Casette di Massa	Team
Silver medal – second place	2016 Sapareva	Team
European Championships
Gold medal – first place	2011 Bursa	Team
Gold medal – first place	2013 Sofia	Team
Gold medal – first place	2015 Madeira	Team
Silver medal – second place	2013 Sofia	Individual
Silver medal – second place	2017 Kamnik	Team
Bronze medal – third place	2015 Madeira	Individual
Snowshoe running
World Snowshoe Championships
Gold medal – first place	2013 Val di Non	Individual
Athletics
European Cross Country Championships
Bronze medal – third place	2012 Budapest	Team

Alex Baldaccini (born 4 April 1988) is an Italian male mountain runner who won WMRA World Cup in 2017.

== See also ==
- European Athlete of the Month (winner October 2012)
