= Vittoria Salvini =

Italian mountain runner (born 1965)

Personal information
- Nationality: Italian
- Born: 14 September 1965 (age 61)

Sport
- Country: Italy
- Sport: Mountain running
Medal record
Mountain running
Event	1st	2nd	3rd
World Championships Individual	0	0	0
World Championships Team	2	0	3
European Championships Individual	0	0	1
European Championships Team
Total	2	0	4
European Championships
Bronze medal – third place	2006 Upice	Individual

Vittoria Salvini (born 14 September 1965) is a former Italian female mountain runner, bronze medallist at the 2006 European Mountain Running Championships.

== Biography ==
At individual senior level she won 5 medals with the national team) at the World Mountain Running Championships.

== Team results ==
- World Mountain Running Championships (5 medals)
  - (gold) 2002, 2005 (2)
  - (bronze) 2006, 2007, 2008 (3)

== National titles ==
- Italian Mountain Running Championships
  - 2002, 2005, 2007 (3)
