= Alice Gaggi =

Italian mountain runner (born 1987)

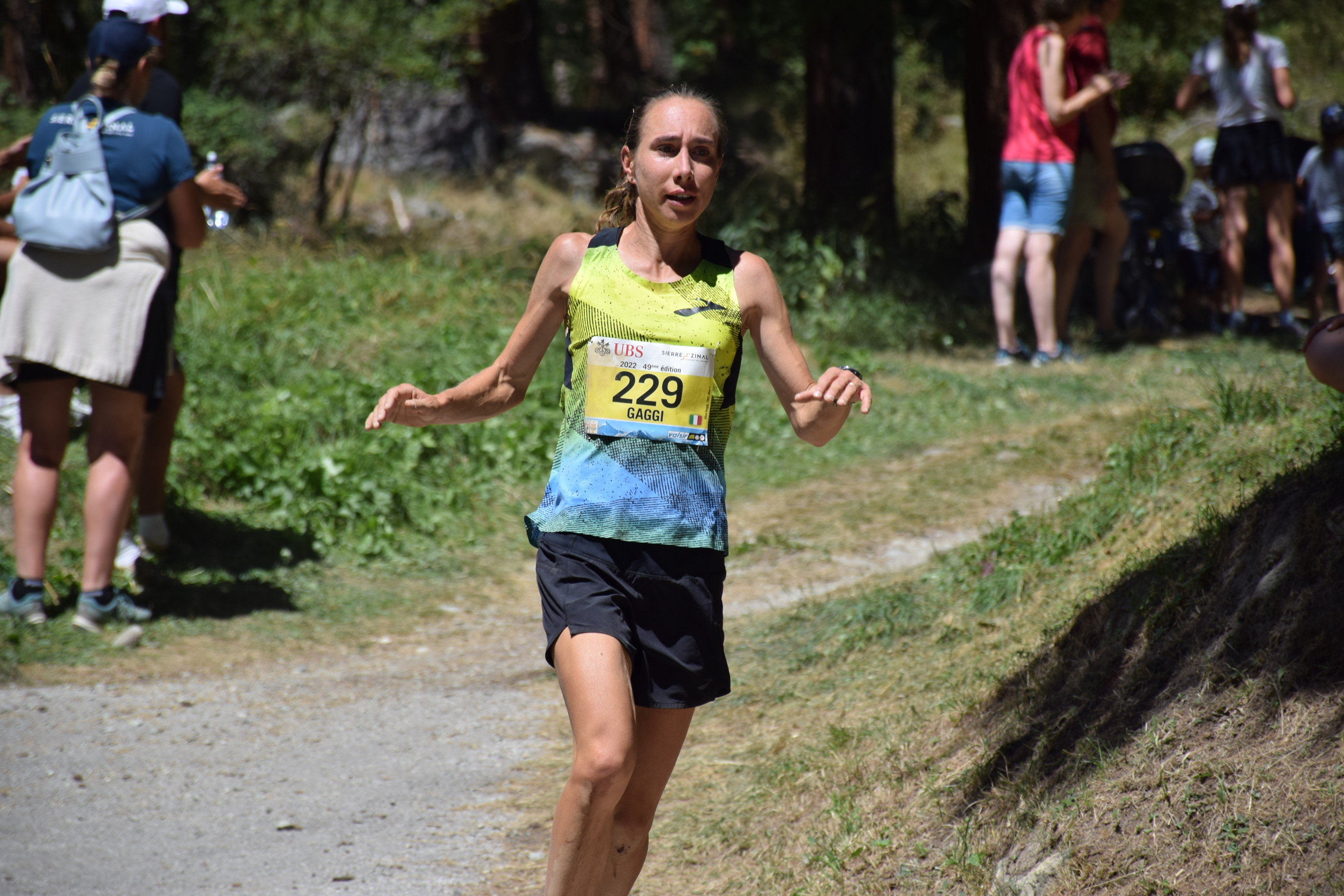
- Alice Gaggi at Sierre-Zinal 2022

Personal information
- Nationality: Italian
- Born: 8 September 1987 (age 38) Sondrio

Sport
- Country: Italy (13 caps)
- Sport: Mountain running
- Club: La Recastello Radici Group
- Coached by: Gianni Fransci

Achievements and titles
- Personal best: Half marathon: 1:15:54 (2016)
Medal record
Mountain running
World Championships
Gold medal – first place	2013 Krynica-Zdrój	Individual
European Championships
Silver medal – second place	2016 Arco	Individual

Alice Gaggi (born 8 September 1987) is an Italian female mountain runner, and world champion at the 2013 World Mountain Running Championships.

== Biography ==
At the individual senior level, she won 7 medals (1 gold individual and 6 with the national team) at the World Mountain Running Championships and 5 (1 silver and 5 with the national team) at the European Mountain Running Championships.

== National titles ==
- Italian Mountain Running Championships
  - Mountain running: 2014, 2017 (2)
- Italian Long Distance Mountain Running Championships
  - Long-distance mountain running: 2015, 2017, 2018 (3)
