= Xavier Chevrier =

Italian runner

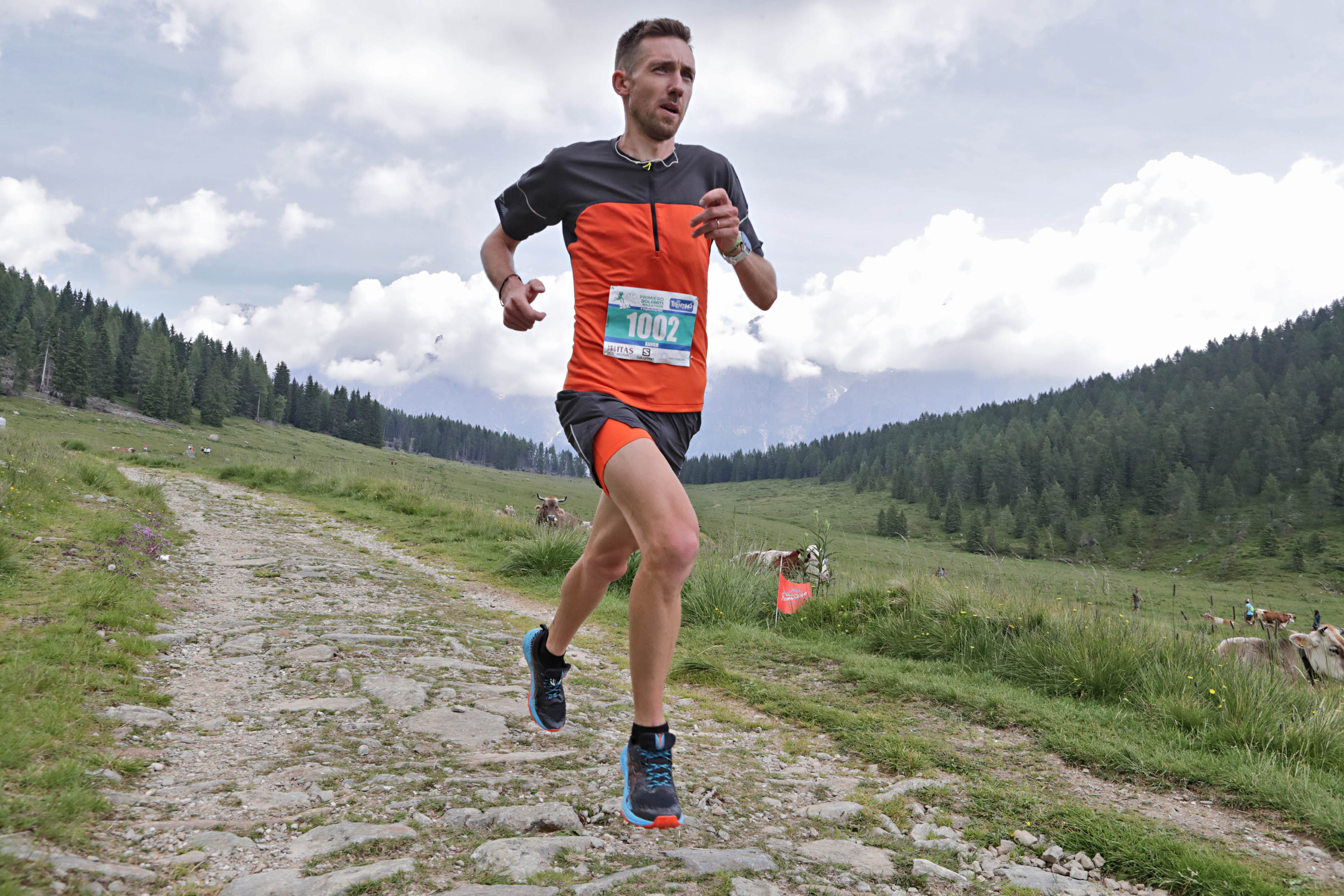
- Xavier Chevrier in 2020

Personal information
- Nationality: Italian
- Born: 17 March 1990 (age 36) Aosta, Italy
- Height: 1.85
- Weight: 65

Sport
- Country: Italy (12 caps)
- Sport: Mountain running; Athletics
- Event: Half marathon
- Club: Atletica Valli Bergamasche Leffe
- Coached by: Paolo Germanetto

Achievements and titles
- Personal best: Half marathon: 1:01'56" (2025)
Medal record
Athletics
European Championships
Bronze medal – third place	2016 Amsterdam	Half marathon team
Mountain running
Event	1st	2nd	3rd
World Championships Team	2	2	4
European Championships Individual	1	0	1
European Championships Team	4	2	0
Total	7	4	5

Xavier Chevrier (French: [ksavje ʃəvʁije]; born 17 March 1990) is an Italian male mountain runner and long-distance runner who won 2017 European Mountain Running Championships.

== Biography ==
Originally from Nus, he also won three national championships at individual senior level in mountain running. He is the nephew of former cross-country skier Attilio Lombard and the cousin of the cross-country skiing champion Federico Pellegrino. He runs a farm with his wife Denise, they have two children, Loïc, born in 2020, and Maïté, born in 2022.

== Achievements ==
Year	Competition	Venue	Position	Event	Time	Notes
Mountain running
2017	European Championships	(Slovenia) Kamnik	1st	Individual	1:02:51	
2017	European Championships	(Slovenia) Kamnik	2nd	Team	17 pts	
2019	European Championships	(Switzerland) Zermatt	3rd	Individual	54:02	
2019	European Championships	(Switzerland) Zermatt	2nd	Team	18 pts	
Athletics
2016	European Championships	(Netherlands) Amsterdam	38th	Half marathon	1:06:31	
2016	European Championships	(Netherlands) Amsterdam	3rd	Team	3:12:41	

== Team results ==
- World Mountain Running Championships
  - (gold) 2015
  - (silver) 2012, 2013, 2016, 2017
  - (bronze) 2014
- European Mountain Running Championships
  - (gold) 2012, 2013, 2015, 2016
  - (silver) 2017

== National titles ==
- Italian Mountain Running Championships
  - 2015, 2017
- Italian Long Distance Mountain Running Championships
  - 2016
