= Gabriele Abate =

Italian mountain runner

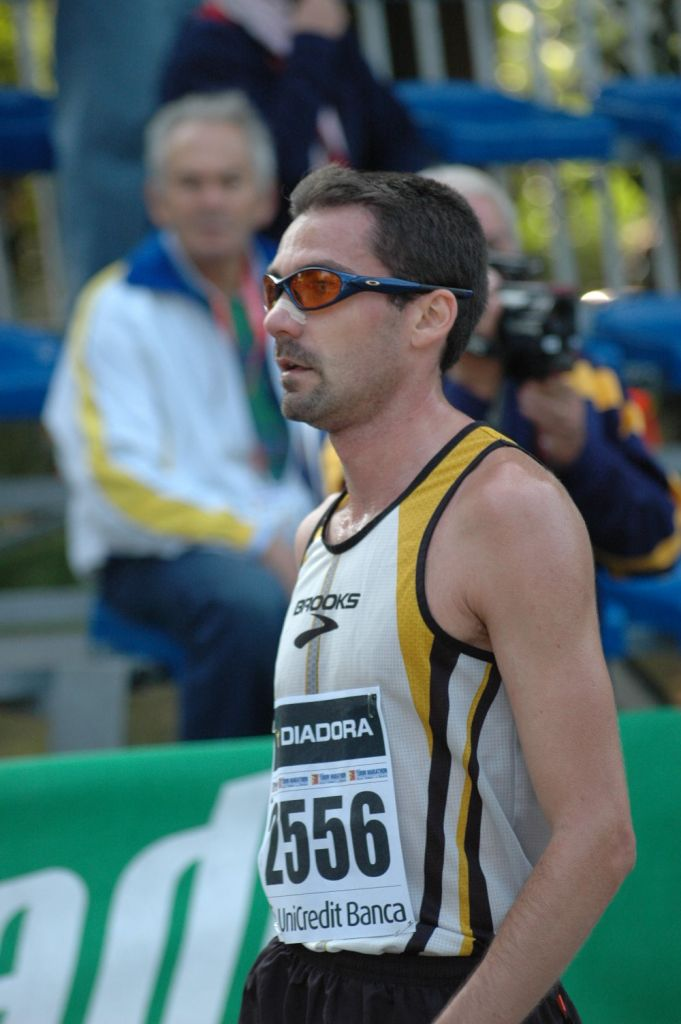

Personal information
- Nationality: Italian
- Born: 19 August 1979 (age 46) Chiusa San Michele, Italy

Sport
- Country: Italy
- Sport: Mountain running

Achievements and titles
- Personal best: Half marathon: 1:06:51 (2011)
Medal record
Mountain running
Event	1st	2nd	3rd
World Championships (individual)	0	1	0
World Championships (team)	5	4	1
European Championships (individual)	0	1	0
European Championships (team)	7	0	0
Total	12	6	1
World Championships
Silver medal – second place	2005 Wellington	Individual
European Championships
Silver medal – second place	2011 Bursa Uludag	Individual

Gabriele Abate (born 19 August 1979) is an Italian male mountain runner, who won a medal at individual senior level at the World Mountain Running Championships.

== Biography ==
He also won a silver medal at individual senior level at the European Mountain Running Championships and others 17 medals with the national team at the world and European championships.

== National titles ==
Abate won three national championships at individual senior level.

- Italian Long Distance Mountain Running Championships
  - Individual: 2010, 2011, 2012

== See also ==
- Italy at the World Mountain Running Championships
- Italy at the European Mountain Running Championships
