= Marco Gaiardo =

Italian mountain runner

Personal information
- Nationality: Italian
- Born: 7 December 1970 (age 55) Italy

Sport
- Country: Italy
- Sport: Mountain running
- Club: US Malonno

Achievements and titles
- Personal best: Half marathon: 1:06:47 (2004)
Medal record
Mountain running
Event	1st	2nd	3rd
World Championships (individual)	0	0	1
World Championships (team)	6	2	0
European Championships (individual)	2	0	2
European Championships (team)	8	0	0
Total	16	2	3
World Championships
Bronze medal – third place	2003 Girdwood	Individual

Marco Gaiardo (born 7 December 1970) is an Italian male mountain runner, who won a medal at individual senior level at the World Mountain Running Championships.

== Biography ==
Gaiardo won also four medals at individual senior level (two gold) and eight gold medals with the national team at the European Mountain Running Championships.

== See also ==
- Italy at the World Mountain Running Championships
- Italy at the European Mountain Running Championships
