= Open class (track and field) =

Track and field event classification

Open class is a track and field event classification defined by World Athletics and USA Track & Field.

== Rules ==
The classification is defined as:

- Having no maximum age limit
- Men's long distance running is limited to male athletes sixteen (16) years and older on the day of the competition.
- Men's race walking and all women's competition, athletes shall be fourteen (14) years or older on the day of the competition

== See also ==
- Under-18 athletics
- Under-20 athletics
- Under-23 athletics
