= Red Bull 400 =

400 metre uphill sprint event

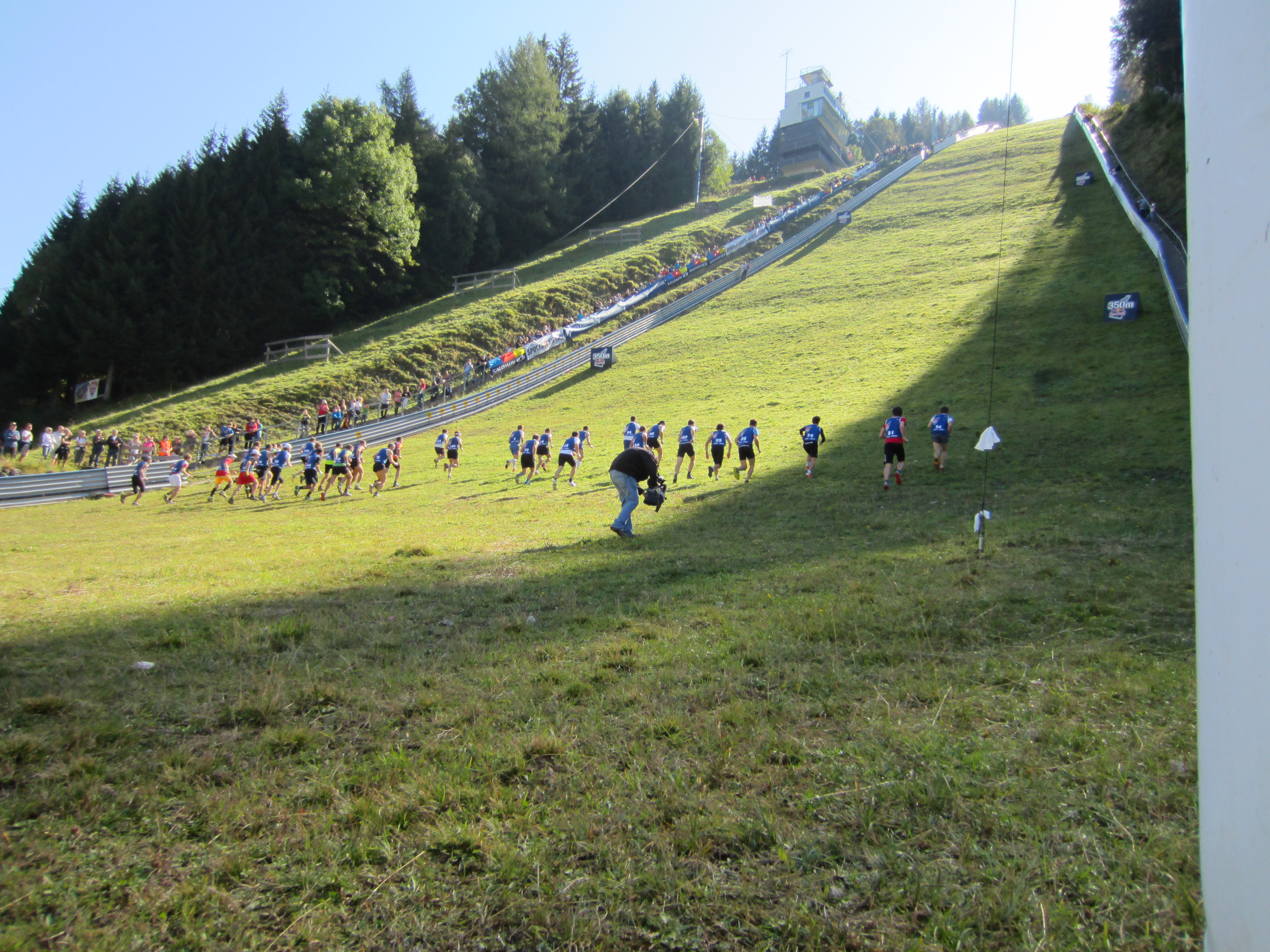
- first ever Red Bull 400 event in Kulm (2011)
- First played: 25 September 2011; Kulm, Tauplitz, Austria

Characteristics
- Type: extreme sports
- Venue: Asia, Europe, North America

Red Bull 400 is an uphill run promoted by Red Bull GmbH since 2011. Competitors from all over the world run from the bottom to the top of ski jumping and ski flying hills, with a total distance of 400 metres (1312 ft) and a maximum incline angle of 37 degrees (75%).

Nineteen countries have hosted Red Bull 400 races: Austria, Bosnia and Herzegovina, Slovenia, Finland, Czech Republic, Canada, Germany, United States, Kazakhstan, Turkey, Japan, Russia, Norway, France, Italy, Poland, Slovakia, Switzerland and South Korea.

== Global map of all Red Bull 400 hosts ==
All 25 locations around the globe hosting events in seventeen countries:

Red Bull 400 (Europe)	Red Bull 400 (Asia) Red Bull 400 (North America)

new hosts in 2019

== Events ==
=== Men ===
No.	Date	Place	Hill	Size	Winner	Second	Third
1	25 September 2011	(Austria) Tauplitz/Bad Mitterndorf	Kulm HS200	FH	(Turkey) Ahmet Arslan	(Austria) Matthias Mayr	(Slovenia) Matjaž Mikloša
2	18 August 2012	(Austria) Tauplitz/Bad Mitterndorf	Kulm HS200	FH	(Poland) Piotr Łobodzinski	(Slovenia) Matjaž Mikloša	(Austria) Andreas Tockner
3	23 September 2012	(Slovenia) Planica	Letalnica bratov Gorišek HS215	FH	(Turkey) Ahmet Arslan	(Slovenia) Matjaž Mikloša	(Slovenia) Simon Alič
4	12 May 2013	(Slovenia) Planica	Letalnica bratov Gorišek HS215	FH	(Slovenia) Simon Alič	(Turkey) Ahmet Arslan	(Slovenia) Matjaž Mikloša
5	19 May 2013	(Austria) Tauplitz/Bad Mitterndorf	Kulm HS200	FH	(Turkey) Ahmet Arslan	(Slovenia) Matjaž Mikloša	(Poland) Piotr Lobodzinski
6	17 May 2014	(Finland) Kuopio	Puijo HS127	LH	(New Zealand) Ross Morrison	(Finland) Ilkka Herola	(Finland) Jukka Kettunen
7	25 May 2014	(Austria) Tauplitz/Bad Mitterndorf	Kulm HS200	FH	(Turkey) Ahmet Arslan	(Slovenia) Simon Novak	(Slovenia) Simon Alič
8	13 September 2014	(Czech Republic) Harrachov	Čerťák HS142	LH	(Slovenia) Matjaž Mikloša	(Slovenia) Simon Novak	(Slovakia) Tomáš Celko
9	9 May 2015	(Finland) Kuopio	Puijo HS127	LH	(Finland) Risto Mägi	(Finland) Ilkka Herola	(Finland) Juha-Matti Mikkolainen
10	19 July 2015	(Canada) Whistler	Whistler Olympic Park HS140	LH	(Canada) Brandon Crichton	(Canada) Shaun Stephens-Whale	(Canada) Michael Simpson
11	25 July 2015	(Germany) Titisee-Neustadt	Hochfirstschanze HS142	LH	(Germany) Christian Riedl	(Slovakia) Tomáš Celko	(Germany) Bastian Glöden
12	15 August 2015	(Czech Republic) Harrachov	Čerťák HS142	LH	(Turkey) Ahmet Arslan	(Slovenia) Matjaž Mikloša	(Czech Republic) Vladislav Razým
13	29 August 2015	(Austria) Bischofshofen	Paul-Ausserleitner-Schanze HS140	LH	(Turkey) Ahmet Arslan	(Slovenia) Matjaž Mikloša	(Austria) Hannes Meissel
14	19 September 2015	(Slovenia) Planica	Letalnica bratov Gorišek HS225	FH	(Turkey) Ahmet Arslan	(Slovenia) Luka Kovačič	(Slovenia) Nejc Kuhar
15	26 September 2015	(United States) Park City	Utah Olympic Park HS134	LH	(Turkey) Ahmet Arslan	(United States) John Tribbia	(United States) Timothy Rugg
16	30 April 2016	(Kazakhstan) Almaty	Gorney Gigant HS140	LH	(Turkey) Ahmet Arslan	(Kazakhstan) Almas Rakhimbayev	(Kazakhstan) Alexey Gusarov
17	28 May 2016	(Finland) Kuopio	Puijo HS127	LH	(Finland) Risto Mägi	(Finland) Ilkka Herola	(Finland) Jukka Kettunen
18	16 July 2016	(Germany) Titisee-Neustadt	Hochfirstschanze HS142	LH	(Turkey) Ahmet Arslan	(Germany) Christian Riedl	(Slovakia) Tomáš Celko
19	30 July 2016	(Canada) Whistler	Whistler Olympic Park HS140	LH	(Canada) Kieran Lumb	(Canada) Shaun Stephens-Whale	(Canada) Brandon Crichton
20	30 July 2016	(Czech Republic) Harrachov	Čerťák HS142	LH	(Slovakia) Tomáš Celko	(Slovenia) Simon Novak	(Slovenia) Martin Dovžan
21	27 August 2016	(Austria) Bischofshofen	Paul-Ausserleitner-Schanze HS140	LH	(Slovakia) Tomáš Celko	(Austria) Hannes Meissel	(Slovenia) Simon Novak
22	17 September 2016	(Slovenia) Planica	Letalnica bratov Gorišek HS225	FH	(Turkey) Ahmet Arslan	(Slovenia) Simon Novak	(Slovenia) Nejc Kuhar
23	24 September 2016	(United States) Park City	Utah Olympic Park HS134	LH	(United States) Tom Goth	(United States) John Tribbia	(United States) Nick Hendrickson
24	14 May 2017	(Kazakhstan) Almaty	Gorney Gigant HS140	LH	(Turkey) Ahmet Arslan	(Kazakhstan) Almas Rakhimbayev	(Kazakhstan) Alexey Gusarov
25	20 May 2017	(Turkey) Erzurum	Kiremitliktepe HS140	LH	(Turkey) Ahmet Arslan	(Turkey) Ramazan Karagöz	(Turkey) Ferhat Bozkurt
26	21 May 2017	(Japan) Sapporo	Ōkurayama HS137	LH	(Japan) Ryota Takasaka	(Japan) Masatoshi Hachisuka	(Japan) Akira Takahashi
27	27 May 2017	(Russia) Chaykovsky	Snezhinka HS140	LH	(Russia) Dmitry Mityaev	(Russia) Vitaliy Chernov	(Russia) Roman Dedov
28	3 June 2017	(Norway) Trondheim	Granåsen HS140	LH	(Norway) Peter Haddon	(Norway) Håkon Hjelstuen	(Norway) Erlend Nydal
29	10 June 2017	(France) Courchevel	Tremplin du Praz HS137	LH	(France) Thibaut Baronian	(France) Alexis Sevennec	(France) Henri Aymond
30	1 July 2017	(Italy) Val di Fiemme	Trampolino dal Ben HS134	LH	(Slovenia) Matjaž Mikloša	(Slovakia) Tomáš Celko	(Italy) Alessandro Pittin
31	15 July 2017	(Germany) Titisee-Neustadt	Hochfirstschanze HS142	LH	(Turkey) Ahmet Arslan	(Germany) Anton Palzer	(Austria) Jakob Mayer
	5 August 2017	(Canada) Whistler	Whistler Olympic Park HS140	LH	poor air quality from fires affecting British Columbia		
32	12 August 2017	(Czech Republic) Harrachov	Čerťák HS142	LH	(Slovakia) Tomáš Celko	(Slovenia) Matjaž Mikloša	(Slovenia) Martin Kozelj
33	26 August 2017	(Austria) Bischofshofen	Paul-Ausserleitner-Schanze HS140	LH	(Germany) Anton Palzer	(Austria) Hannes Meissel	(Slovakia) Tomáš Celko
34	16 September 2017	(Slovenia) Planica	Letalnica bratov Gorišek HS225	FH	(Slovenia) Luka Kovačič	(Slovenia) Nejc Kuhar	(Austria) Jakob Mayer
35	30 September 2017	(United States) Park City	Utah Olympic Park HS134	LH	(United States) Jared Shumate	(United States) Justin Robbins	(Mexico) Gustavo Isaac Mendoza Cruz
36	28 October 2017	(Russia) Sochi	RusSki Gorki HS140	LH	(Russia) Dmitry Mityaev	(Russia) Evgeny Markov	(Russia) Sergey Polygalov
37	12 May 2018	(Japan) Sapporo	Ōkurayama HS137	LH	(Japan) Ryota Takasaka	(Japan) Ryota Takasaka	(Japan) Yasuhiro Kodaira
38	12 May 2018	(United States) Ironwood	Copper Peak K145	FH	(United States) Ian Torcha	(United States) Matt Lipsey	(United States) Jared Shumate
39	12 May 2018	(Finland) Lahti	Salpausselkä HS130	LH	(Finland) Mikko Patana	(Finland) Juho Veikkolainen	(Finland) Iivo Niskanen
40	20 May 2018	(Kazakhstan) Almaty	Gorney Gigant HS140	LH	(Kazakhstan) Almas Rakhimbayev	(Kazakhstan) Eldar Orussayev	(Kazakhstan) Dmitriy Rive
41	26 May 2018	(Russia) Chaykovsky	Snezhinka HS140	LH	(Russia) Andrey Shklyayev	(Russia) Danil Ponomaryov	(Russia) Yevgeny Markov
42	2 June 2018	(Norway) Trondheim	Granåsen HS140	LH	(Norway) Erik Resell	(Slovenia) Luka Kovačič	(Slovenia) Matjaž Mikloša
43	30 June 2018	(Italy) Val di Fiemme	Trampolino dal Ben HS134	LH	(Slovenia) Matjaž Mikloša	(Slovakia) Tomáš Čelko	(Italy) Alessandro Pittin
44	14 July 2018	(Canada) Whistler	Whistler Olympic Park HS140	LH	(Canada) Kieran Lumb	(Canada) Jordan Guenette	(Canada) Marian Treger
45	21 July 2018	(France) Courchevel	Tremplin du Praz HS137	LH	(France) Thibaut Baronian	(France) Nathan Jovet	(France) Adrien Perret
46	28 July 2018	(Germany) Titisee-Neustadt	Hochfirstschanze HS142	LH	(Turkey) Ahmet Arslan	(Slovakia) Tomas Celko	(Germany) Julian Kern
47	11 August 2018	(Slovakia) Štrbské Pleso	MS 1970 HS125	LH	(Slovakia) Tomáš Čelko	(Czech Republic) Tomáš Maceček	(Slovakia) Jakub Šiarnik
48	18 August 2018	(Poland) Zakopane	Wielka Krokiew HS140	LH	(Slovakia) Tomáš Čelko	(Poland) Krzysztof Bodurka	(Poland) Szczepan Kupczak
49	25 August 2018	(Austria) Bischofshofen	Paul-Ausserleitner-Schanze HS140	LH	(Norway) Erik Resell	(Austria) Jakob Mayer	(Germany) Anton Palzer
50	15 September 2018	(Slovenia) Planica	Letalnica bratov Gorišek HS240	FH	(Slovenia) Luka Kovačič	(Slovenia) Nejc Kuhar	(Slovenia) Luka Mihelič
51	15 September 2018	(United States) Park City	Utah Olympic Park HS134	LH	(United States) Miles Fink-Debray	(United States) Taylor Fletcher	(United States) Jared Shumate
52	13 October 2018	(Russia) Sochi	RusSki Gorki HS140	LH	(Russia) Danil Ponomarev	(Russia) Vitaly Chernov	(Russia) Alexander Antonov
53	20 October 2018	(Switzerland) Einsiedeln	Andreas Küttel Schanze HS117	NH	(Austria) Jakob Mayer	(Switzerland) Werner Marti	(Switzerland) Sven Riederer
54	28 April 2019	(Kazakhstan) Almaty	Gorney Gigant HS140	LH	(Turkey) Ahmet Arslan	(Kazakhstan) Rakhimbayev Daulet	(Kazakhstan) Rakhimbayev Almas
55	11 May 2019	(Finland) Lahti	Salpausselkä HS130	LH	(Slovenia) Martin Kozelj	(Finland) Juho Veikkolainen	(Estonia) Han Hendrik Piho
56	11 May 2019	(United States) Ironwood	Copper Peak K145	FH	(United States) Miles Fink-Debray	(United States) Matt Novakovich	(United States) Ian Torchia
57	18 May 2019	(Japan) Sapporo	Ōkurayama HS137	LH	(Japan) Roy Ueda	(Japan) Ryoji Watanabe	(Japan) Masato Tanaka
58	25 May 2019	(Russia) Chaykovsky	Snezhinka HS140	LH	(Russia) Andrey Shklyayev	(Russia) Ivan Kuznetsov	(Russia) Danil Ponomaryov
59	1 June 2019	(Norway) Trondheim	Granåsen HS140	LH	(Norway) Erik Resell	(Norway) Dag Blandkjenn	(Norway) Vegard Jarvis Westergård
60	1 June 2019	(United States) Park City	Utah Olympic Park HS134	LH	(United States) Maxwell Dosher	(United States) Tucker Hoefler	(United States) Taylor Flethcher
61	7 June 2019	(Czech Republic) Liberec	Ještěd A HS134	LH	(Slovakia) Jakub Šiarnik	(Czech Republic) Tomáš Maceček	(Slovenia) Martin Koželj
62	15 June 2019	(Switzerland) Einsiedeln	Andreas Küttel Schanze HS117	NH	(Austria) Jakob Mayer	(Switzerland) Janis Gächter	(Switzerland) Michael Fahrni
64	29 June 2019	(Poland) Zakopane	Wielka Krokiew HS140	LH	(Slovakia) Tomas Celko	(Poland) Szcepan Kupczak	(Poland) Adam Cieślar
65	6 July 2019	(Italy) Val di Fiemme	Trampolino dal Ben HS134	LH	(Austria) Jakob Mayer	(Slovenia) Luka Kovačič	(Italy) Stefano Gardener
66	6 July 2019	(France) Courchevel	Tremplin du Praz HS137	LH	(France) Thibaut Baronian	(France) Thibault Anselmet	(France) Paul Chey
67	13 July 2019	(Canada) Whistler	Whistler Olympic Park HS140	LH	(Canada) Alexandre Ricard	(Norway) Erik Resell	(Austria) Jakob Mayer
68	20 July 2019	(Germany) Titisee-Neustadt	Hochfirstschanze HS142	LH	(Germany) Anton Palzer	(Austria) Jakob Mayer	(Slovenia) Luka Kovačič
69	3 August 2019	(Slovakia) Štrbské Pleso	MS 1970 HS125	LH	(Czech Republic) Tomas Macecek	(Slovakia) Jakub Šiarnik	(Slovakia) Boris Obergries
70	4 August 2019	(Kazakhstan) Shchuchinsk	National Ski Center HS140	LH	(Russia) Peter Tikhonov	(Kazakhstan) Dmitry Kolomeets	(Kazakhstan) Stepan Kinev
71	24 August 2019	(Austria) Bischofshofen	Paul-Ausserleitner-Schanze HS140	LH	(Austria) Jakob Mayer	(Slovakia) Jakub Šiarnik	(Austria) Alexander Brandner-Egger
72	14 September 2019	(Slovenia) Planica	Letalnica bratov Gorišek HS225	FH	(Slovenia) Luka Kovačič	(Austria) Jakob Mayer	(Slovenia) Andrej Koželj
4Titude Challenge					(Austria) Jakob Mayer	(Austria) Alexander Brandner-Egger	(Slovenia) Matjaž Mikloša
73	28 September 2019	(South Korea) Pyeongchang	Alpensia Ski Jumping Centre HS142	LH	(South Korea) Jangseop Lee	(South Korea) Byeongkwon Park	(South Korea) Jinwan Kim

=== Women ===
No.	Date	Place	Hill	Size	Winner	Second	Third
1	25 September 2011	(Austria) Tauplitz/Bad Mitterndorf	Kulm HS200	FH	(Italy) Antonella Confortola	(Austria) Margit Engelseder	(Austria) Teresa Stadlober
2	18 August 2012	(Austria) Tauplitz/Bad Mitterndorf	Kulm HS200	FH	(Austria) Margit Engelseder	(Austria) Irmi Kubicka	(Austria) Anita Weiß
3	23 September 2012	(Slovenia) Planica	Letalnica bratov Gorišek HS215	FH	(Austria) Teresa Stadlober	(Slovenia) Petra Mikloša	(Slovenia) Manja Frece
4	12 May 2013	(Slovenia) Planica	Letalnica bratov Gorišek HS215	FH	(Austria) Teresa Stadlober	(Slovenia) Neja Kršinar	(Slovenia) Lea Einfalt
5	19 May 2013	(Austria) Tauplitz/Bad Mitterndorf	Kulm HS200	FH	(Austria) Andrea Mayr	(Italy) Antonella Confortola	(Austria) Teresa Stadlober
6	17 May 2014	(Finland) Kuopio	Puijo HS127	LH	(Finland) Hanna Raitanen		
7	25 May 2014	(Austria) Tauplitz/Bad Mitterndorf	Kulm HS200	FH	(Austria) Andrea Mayr	(United Kingdom) Claire Miller	(Germany) Maria Hochfilzer
8	13 September 2014	(Czech Republic) Harrachov	Čerťák HS142	LH	(Czech Republic) Karolína Grohová	(Czech Republic) Helena Erbenová	(Czech Republic) Kateřina Beroušková
9	9 May 2015	(Finland) Kuopio	Puijo HS127	LH	(Finland) Maria Mietinen	(Finland) Aiki Salumäe	(Finland) Elina Koponen
10	19 July 2015	(Canada) Whistler	Whistler Olympic Park HS140	LH	(Canada) Zoe Dawson	(Canada) Chantelle Groenewoud	(Canada) Tiffany Phillips
11	25 July 2015	(Germany) Titisee-Neustadt	Hochfirstschanze HS142	LH	(Estonia) Egle Uljas	(Germany) Mona Kunz	(Germany) Janice Waldvogel
12	15 August 2015	(Czech Republic) Harrachov	Čerťák HS142	LH	(Poland) Dominika Wiśniewska-Ulfik	(Czech Republic) Kateřina Beroušková	(Czech Republic) Dana Šatrová
13	29 August 2015	(Austria) Bischofshofen	Paul-Ausserleitner-Schanze HS140	LH	(Czech Republic) Lenka Švábíková	(Slovakia) Katarina Lovrantova	(Austria) Veronika Windisch
14	19 September 2015	(Slovenia) Planica	Letalnica bratov Gorišek HS225	FH	(Italy) Antonella Confortola	(Slovenia) Karmen Klančnik	(Slovenia) Petra Mikloša
15	26 September 2015	(United States) Park City	Utah Olympic Park HS134	LH	(United States) Liz Stephens	(Austria) Veronika Mayehofer	(United States) Koren Roach
16	30 April 2016	(Kazakhstan) Almaty	Gorney Gigant HS140	LH	(Kazakhstan) Zhanna Mamazhanova	(Kazakhstan) Merjen Ishangulieva	(Russia) Nataliya Nesheret
17	28 May 2016	(Finland) Kuopio	Puijo HS127	LH	(Finland) Janica Mäkelä	(Finland) Anni Kainulainen	(Finland) Hanna Raitanen
18	16 July 2016	(Germany) Titisee-Neustadt	Hochfirstschanze HS142	LH	(Turkey) Yasemin Can	(Czech Republic) Lenka Švábíková	(Estonia) Egle Uljas
19	30 July 2016	(Canada) Whistler	Whistler Olympic Park HS140	LH	(Canada) Rachel McBride	(Canada) Chantelle Groenewoud	(Canada) Zoe Dawson
20	30 July 2016	(Czech Republic) Harrachov	Čerťák HS142	LH	(Czech Republic) Adéla Stránská	(Czech Republic) Sandra Schützová	(Czech Republic) Kateřina Beroušková
21	27 August 2016	(Austria) Bischofshofen	Paul-Ausserleitner-Schanze HS140	LH	(Austria) Andrea Mayr	(Slovakia) Katarina Lovrantova	(Czech Republic) Lenka Švábíková
22	17 September 2016	(Slovenia) Planica	Letalnica bratov Gorišek HS225	FH	(Italy) Valentina Belotti	(Czech Republic) Adéla Stránská	(Italy) Antonella Confortola
23	24 September 2016	(United States) Park City	Utah Olympic Park HS134	LH	(United States) Liz Stephens	(United States) Megan Foley	(United States) Stacey Armijo
24	14 May 2017	(Kazakhstan) Almaty	Gorney Gigant HS140	LH	(Kazakhstan) Zhanna Mamazhanova	(Kazakhstan) Nadezhda Melkova	(Russia) Elizabeth Teish
25	20 May 2017	(Turkey) Erzurum	Kiremitliktepe HS140	LH	(Turkey) Ece Bakici	(Turkey) Neval Gördük	(Russia) Elena Polyakova
26	21 May 2017	(Japan) Sapporo	Ōkurayama HS137	LH	(Japan) Yukari Tanaka	(Japan) Yokohei Yoko	(Japan) Ishida Masako
27	27 May 2017	(Russia) Chaykovsky	Snezhinka HS140	LH	(Russia) Yekaterina Mityaeva	(Russia) Maria Chetherukhina	(Russia) Natalia Neshcheret
28	3 June 2017	(Norway) Trondheim	Granåsen HS140	LH	(Norway) Marte Lien Johnsen	(Norway) Guro Jordheim	(Norway) Silje Moen
29	10 June 2017	(France) Courchevel	Tremplin du Praz HS137	LH	(France) Axelle Mollaret	(France) Ophelie Orset	(France) Laurianne Plaçais
30	1 July 2017	(Italy) Val di Fiemme	Trampolino dal Ben HS134	LH	(Australia) Margaret Reeves	(Italy) Antonella Confortola	(Italy) Roberta Jacquin
31	15 July 2017	(Germany) Titisee-Neustadt	Hochfirstschanze HS142	LH	(Japan) Yukari Tanaka	(Slovakia) Katarina Lovrantova	(Germany) Sarah Mittelberger
	5 August 2017	(Canada) Whistler	Whistler Olympic Park HS140	LH	poor air quality from fires affecting British Columbia		
32	12 August 2017	(Czech Republic) Harrachov	Čerťák HS142	LH	(Czech Republic) Adéla Stránská	(Czech Republic) Kateřina Beroušková	(Poland) Dominika Wiśniewska-Ulfik
33	26 August 2017	(Austria) Bischofshofen	Paul-Ausserleitner-Schanze HS140	LH	(Austria) Andrea Mayr	(Poland) Dominiką Wiśniewską-Ulfik	(Austria) Veronika Windisch
34	16 September 2017	(Slovenia) Planica	Letalnica bratov Gorišek HS225	FH	(Poland) Dominika Wiśniewska-Ulfik	(Slovenia) Barbara Trunkelj	(Slovenia) Ana Čufer
35	30 September 2017	(United States) Park City	Utah Olympic Park HS134	LH	(United States) Megan Foley	(United States) Liz Stephen	(United States) Emma Garrard
36	28 October 2017	(Russia) Sochi	RusSki Gorki HS140	LH	(Russia) Yekaterina Mityaeva	(Russia) Olga Tarantinova	(Russia) Anastasiya Kozina
37	12 May 2018	(Japan) Sapporo	Ōkurayama HS137	LH	(Japan) Takako Takamura	(Japan) Yukari Tanaka	(Japan) Mika Tsuji
38	12 May 2018	(United States) Ironwood	Copper Peak K145	FH	(United States) Anna Mooi	(United States) Katie Kubont	(United States) Jennifer Chaudoir
39	12 May 2018	(Finland) Lahti	Salpausselkä HS130	LH	(Finland) Laura Manninen	(Finland) Mila Kojonen	(Finland) Nella Tamminen
40	20 May 2018	(Kazakhstan) Almaty	Gorney Gigant HS140	LH	(Kyrgyzstan) Mariya Korobitskaia	(Kazakhstan) Tatyana Neroznak	
41	26 May 2018	(Russia) Chaykovsky	Snezhinka HS140	LH	(Russia) Yekaterina Mityaeva	(Russia) Natalya Tikhonova	(Russia) Marya Suyetina
42	2 June 2018	(Norway) Trondheim	Granåsen HS140	LH	(Switzerland) Lea Fischer	(Norway) Guro Jordheim	(Norway) Marte Vatn
43	30 June 2018	(Italy) Val di Fiemme	Trampolino dal Ben HS134	LH	(Australia) Margaret Reeves	(Italy) Antonella Confortola	(Italy) Roberta Jacquin
44	14 July 2018	(Canada) Whistler	Whistler Olympic Park HS140	LH	(Canada) Robyn Mildren	(Canada) Brooke Spence	(Canada) Rachel McBride
45	21 July 2018	(France) Courchevel	Tremplin du Praz HS137	LH	(Switzerland) Mélanie Jeannerod	(Australia) Suzy Walsham	(France) Ophélie Orset
46	28 July 2018	(Germany) Titisee-Neustadt	Hochfirstschanze HS142	LH	(Australia) Suzy Walsham	(Germany) Sarah Mittelberger	(Germany) Nadine Richter
47	11 August 2018	(Slovakia) Štrbské Pleso	MS 1970 HS125	LH	(Slovakia) Kristína Néč-Lapinová	(Czech Republic) Eszter Hortobágyiová	(Poland) Dominika Wisiniewska-Ulfik
48	18 August 2018	(Poland) Zakopane	Wielka Krokiew HS140	LH	(Poland) Iwona Januszyk	(Poland) Anna Ficner	(Poland) Dominika Wiśniewska-Ulfik
49	25 August 2018	(Austria) Bischofshofen	Paul-Ausserleitner-Schanze HS140	LH	(Austria) Andrea Mayr	(Czech Republic) Adela Stranska	(Poland) Iwona Januszyk
50	15 September 2018	(Slovenia) Planica	Letalnica bratov Gorišek HS240	FH	(Slovenia) Barbara Trunkelj	(Slovenia) Ana Čufer	(Austria) Marlies Penker
51	15 September 2018	(United States) Park City	Utah Olympic Park HS134	LH	(United States) Megan Foley	(United States) Sue Minneci	(United States) Emma Garrard
52	13 October 2018	(Russia) Sochi	RusSki Gorki HS140	LH	(Russia) Loubov Novgorodtseva	(Russia) Ekaterina Ryazanova	(Russia) Oksana Stefanishina
53	20 October 2018	(Switzerland) Einsiedeln	Andreas Küttel Schanze HS117	NH	(Switzerland) Judith Wyder	(Switzerland) Mélanie Jeannerod	(Switzerland) Nathalie Philipp
54	28 April 2019	(Kazakhstan) Almaty	Gorney Gigant HS140	LH	(Kyrgyzstan) Mariya Korobitskaya	(Kazakhstan) Angelina Shuryga	(Kazakhstan) Annastasiya Khmelnitskaya
55	11 May 2019	(Finland) Lahti	Salpausselkä HS130	LH	(Finland) Mila Koljonen	(Russia) Valeriia Merkureva	(Russia) Elena Bogdanova
56	11 May 2019	(United States) Ironwood	Copper Peak K145	FH	(United States) Sarah Hendrickson	(United States) Kristen Monachan	(United States) Kameron Burmeister
57	18 May 2019	(Japan) Sapporo	Ōkurayama HS137	LH	(Japan) Yuko Tateishi	(Japan) Moeko Yasugahira	(Japan) Mika Taniguchi
58	25 May 2019	(Russia) Chaykovsky	Snezhinka HS140	LH	(Russia) Loubov Novgorodtseva	(Russia) Anastasiya Kozina	(Russia) Zulfiya Gaynarova
59	1 June 2019	(Norway) Trondheim	Granåsen HS140	LH	(Norway) Wenche Audal Snildalski	(Norway) Carina Ulsund	(Switzerland) Lea Fischer
60	1 June 2019	(United States) Park City	Utah Olympic Park HS134	LH	(United States) Liz Stephen	(United States) Amber Zimmerman	(United States) Savana Fassio
61	7 June 2019	(Czech Republic) Liberec	Ještěd A HS134	LH	(Czech Republic) Adéla Stránská	(Czech Republic) Barbora Havlíčková	(Czech Republic) Petra Hynčicivá
62	15 June 2019	(Switzerland) Einsiedeln	Andreas Küttel Schanze HS117	NH	(Belgium) Caroline Manil	(Switzerland) Deborah Chiarello	(Switzerland) Patrizia Knuchel
64	29 June 2019	(Poland) Zakopane	Wielka Krokiew HS140	LH	(Poland) Magdalena Anna Kozielska	(Poland) Iwona Januszyk	(Poland) Anna Ficner
65	6 July 2019	(Italy) Val di Fiemme	Trampolino dal Ben HS134	LH	(Italy) Antonella Confortola	(Italy) Agata Marchi	(Italy) Barbara Vasselai
66	6 July 2019	(France) Courchevel	Tremplin du Praz HS137	LH	(France) Lucie Jamsin	(France) Melanie Jeannrod	(France) Anne Sophie Pont
67	13 July 2019	(Canada) Whistler	Whistler Olympic Park HS140	LH	(Canada) Madison Sands	(Canada) Brooke Spence	(Canada) Robyn Mildren
68	20 July 2019	(Germany) Titisee-Neustadt	Hochfirstschanze HS142	LH	(Singapore) Suzy Walsham	(Germany) Mona Kunz	(Germany) Annika Wohlfahrt
69	3 August 2019	(Slovakia) Štrbské Pleso	MS 1970 HS125	LH	(Slovakia) Martina Bellušová	(Czech Republic) Adela Voráčková	(Slovakia) Katarína Gundová
70	4 August 2019	(Kazakhstan) Schuchinsk	National Ski Center HS140	LH	(Kazakhstan) Tatyana Neroznak	(Kazakhstan) Irina Bykova	(Kyrgyzstan) Julia Fernas
71	24 August 2019	(Austria) Bischofshofen	Paul-Ausserleitner-Schanze HS140	LH	(Austria) Andrea Mayr	(Austria) Veronika W	(Finland) Mila Koljonen
72	14 September 2019	(Slovenia) Planica	Letalnica bratov Gorišek HS225	FH	(Slovenia) Barbara Trunkelj	(Slovenia) Tea Femc	(Slovenia) Mojca Koligar
4Titude Challenge					(Austria) Martina Wernig	(Austria) Melanie Mayer	(Australia) Suzie Walsham
73	28 September 2019	(South Korea) Pyeongchang	Alpensia Ski Jumping Centre HS142	LH	(South Korea) Hyunji Kang	(South Korea) Heeyeong Kim	(South Korea) Somin Park

World Championships
