= 2010 World Mountain Running Championships =

International mountain running competition

The 26th World Mountain Running Championships were held in Kamnik, Slovenia on September 5, 2010. Around 350 athletes from 39 countries were present, which was a record of the number of nations taking part in the championships.

== Results ==
=== Medals ===
Event	Gold	Silver	Bronze
Senior Men	Samson K. Gashazghi; Eritrea	A. Teklay Weldemariam; Eritrea	Geoffrey Kusuro; Uganda
Senior Women	Andrea Mayr; Austria	Valentina Belotti; Italy	Martina Straehl; Switzerland
Junior Men	Yossief T. Andemichael; Eritrea	Ridvan Bozkurt; Turkey	Jente Joly; Belgium
Junior Women	Yasemin Can; Turkey	Burcu Dag; Turkey	Adelaide Pantheon; France
Team Senior Men	Eritrea	United States	Italy
Team Senior Women	Italy	Switzerland	Russia
Team Junior Men	Turkey	Germany	Italy
Team Junior Women	Turkey	Romania	Great Britain

=== Men ===
Distance 12 km, difference in height 1220 m, participants 149.

Rank	Athlete	Country	Time
1	Samson Gashazghi	Eritrea	56:25
2	Azerya Teklay Weldemariam	Eritrea	56:28
3	Geofrey Kusuro	Uganda	56:57
4	Petro Manu	Eritrea	57:00
5	Stephen Kiprotich	Uganda	57:16
6	Abraham Kidane	Eritrea	57:55
7	Ahmet Aslan	Turkey	58:14
8	Jonathan Wyatt	New Zealand	58:23
9	Mohamed Haben	Eritrea	58:59
10	Joe Gray	United States	59:27

Team

Rank	Team	Athletes	Points
1st place, gold medalist(s)	Eritrea	Samson K. Gashazghi, Azeria Teklay, Petro Mamu, Abraham Kidane, Mohamed Haben, Mesfin Fissehatsion	13
2nd place, silver medalist(s)	United States	Joe Gray, Max King, Tommy Manning, Eric Blake, Rickey Gates, Chris Lundstrom	71
3rd place, bronze medalist(s)	Italy	Gabriele Abate, Marco De Gasperi, Bernard Dematteis, Antonio Toninelli, Gerd Frick, Tommaso Vaccina	77

=== Women ===
Distance 8.5 km, difference in height 960 m, participants 70.

Rank	Athlete	Country	Time
1	Andrea Mayr	Austria	49:30
2	Valentina Belotti	Italy	50:08
3	Martina Strähl	Switzerland	50:42
4	Svetlana Demidenko	Russia	51:02
5	Mateja Kosovelj	Slovenia	51:24
6	Antonella Confortola	Italy	52:19
7	Jelena Ruchljada	Russia	52:30
8	Claudia Helfenberger	Switzerland	52:35
9	Maria Grazia Roberti	Italy	52:42
10	Barnadette Meier	Switzerland	52:57

Team

Rank	Team	Athletes	Points
1st place, gold medalist(s)	Italy	Valentina Belotti, Antonella Confortola, Maria Grazia Roberti, Alice Gaggi	17
2nd place, silver medalist(s)	Switzerland	Martina Strähl, Claudia Helfenberger, Barnadette Meier, Angeline Flückiger-Joly	21
3rd place, bronze medalist(s)	Russia	Svetlana Semova, Elena Rukhlyada, Elena Nagovitsyna, Janna Vokueva	36

=== Junior Men ===
Distance 8.5 km, difference in height 960 m, participants 76.

Individual

Rank	Runner	Country	Time
1st place, gold medalist(s)	Yossief Tekle	Eritrea	42:30
2nd place, silver medalist(s)	Ridvan Bozkurt	Turkey	46:00
3rd place, bronze medalist(s)	Jente Joly	Belgium	46:29
4	Ergin Ulas	Turkey	46:59
5	Michael Gras	France	47:14
6	Dewi Griffiths	United Kingdom	47:36
7	Maciej Bierczak	Poland	48:15
8	Anton Palzer	Germany	48:44
9	Fabian Alruan	Germany	49:03
10	Martin Mattle	Austria	49:07

Team

Rank	Team	Athletes	Points
1st place, gold medalist(s)	Turkey	Ridvan Bozkurt, Ergin Ulas, Sebahattin Yildirimci, Sonmez Dag	20
2nd place, silver medalist(s)	Germany	Anton Palzer, Fabian Alruan, Matthias Dorfer, Manuel Stoeckert	33
3rd place, bronze medalist(s)	Italy	Paolo Ruatti, Massimo Farcoz, Andrea Debiasi, Alex Cavallar	41

=== Junior Women ===
Distance 4.5 km, difference in height 420 m, participants 51.

Individual

Rank	Runner	Country	Time
1st place, gold medalist(s)	Yasemin Can	Turkey	24:04
2nd place, silver medalist(s)	Burcu Dag	Turkey	24:42
3rd place, bronze medalist(s)	Adelaide Pantheon	France	24:48
4	Heidi Weng	Norway	25:25
5	Cristina Negru	Romania	26:01
6	Lea Einfalt	Slovenia	26:15
7	Catriona Buchanan	United Kingdom	26:26
8	Denisa Dragomir	Romania	26:30
9	Yagmur Tarhan	Turkey	26:34
10	Kamila Paluch	Poland	26:39

Team

Rank	Team	Athletes	Points
1st place, gold medalist(s)	Turkey	Yasemin Can, Burcu Dag, Yagmur Tarhan	3
2nd place, silver medalist(s)	Romania	Cristina Negru, Denisa Dragomir, Adelina Panaet	13
3rd place, bronze medalist(s)	United Kingdom	Catriona Buchanan, Becky Lambson, Hannah Baetson	19
