= 2011 World Mountain Running Championships =

- Official logo
- Location: Tirana, Albania
- Start date: September 11, 2011

The 27th World Mountain Running Championships were held in Tirana, Albania on September 11, 2011. Around 400 athletes from 5 continents were present.

== Results ==
=== Medalists ===
Event	Gold	Silver	Bronze
Senior Men	Max King; United States	Ahmet Arslan; Turkey	Martin Dematteis; Italy
Senior Women	Kasie Enman; United States	Elena Rukhlyada; Russia	Marie-Laure Dumerques; France
Junior Men	Adem Karagoz; Turkey	Saul Padua Rodriguez; Colombia	Murat Orak; Turkey
Junior Women	Lea Einfalt; Slovenia	Cesminaz Yilmaz; Turkey	Denisa Ionela Dragomir; Romania
Team Senior Men	Italy	Turkey	France
Team Senior Women	Italy	Czech Republic	Great Britain
Team Junior Men	Turkey	Poland	Italy
Team Junior Women	Turkey	Romania	Slovenia

=== Men ===
Distance 13.5 km, difference in height 1500 m, participants 104.

Individual

Rank	Runner	Country	Time
1st place, gold medalist(s)	Max King	United States	52:06
2nd place, silver medalist(s)	Ahmet Arslan	Turkey	52:41
3rd place, bronze medalist(s)	Martin Dematteis	Italy	52:57
4	Bernard Dematteis	Italy	54:16
5	Marco De Gasperi	Italy	54:33
6	Didier Zago	France	54:50
7	Ionut Zinca	Romania	54:52
8	James Kibet	Uganda	55:09
9	Adam Kovacs	Hungary	55:22
10	Julien Rancon	France	55:30

Team

Rank	Team	Athletes	Points
1st place, gold medalist(s)	Italy	Martin Dematteis, Bernard Dematteis, Marco De Gasperi, Gabriele Abate, Emanuele Manzi, Alex Baldaccini	26
2nd place, silver medalist(s)	Turkey	Ahmet Arslan, Ercan Muslu, Adem Karatas, Mehmet Akkoyun, Arif Kitir, Deniz Kazan	65
3rd place, bronze medalist(s)	France	Didier Zago, Julien Rancon, Guillaume Fontaine, Renaud Jaillardon, Said Jandari	77

=== Women ===
Distance 8.8 km, difference in height 1000 m, participants 52.

Individual

Rank	Runner	Country	Time
1st place, gold medalist(s)	Kasie Enman	United States	40:39
2nd place, silver medalist(s)	Elena Rukhlyada	Russia	41:47
3rd place, bronze medalist(s)	Marie-Laure Dumergues	France	42:23
4	Pavla Schorna Matyasova	Czech Republic	42:39
5	Lizzie Adams	United Kingdom	42:43
6	Mateja Kosovelj	Slovenia	42:55
7	Ornella Ferrara	Italy	43:11
8	Antonella Confortola	Italy	43:14
9	Alice Gaggi	Italy	43:19
10	Emma Clayton	United Kingdom	43:22

Team

Rank	Team	Athletes	Points
1st place, gold medalist(s)	Italy	Ornella Ferrara, Antonella Confortola, Alice Gaggi, Valentina Belotti	24
2nd place, silver medalist(s)	Czech Republic	Pavla Schorna Matyasova, Ivana Sekyrova, Tatiana Metelkova	30
3rd place, bronze medalist(s)	United Kingdom	Lizzie Adams, Emma Clayton, Mary Wilkinson, Kate Goodhead	31

=== Junior Men ===
Distance 8.8 km, difference in height 1000 m, participants 61.

Individual

Rank	Runner	Country	Time
1st place, gold medalist(s)	Adem Karagoz	Turkey	37:01
2nd place, silver medalist(s)	Saul A. Padua Rodriguez	Colombia	37:40
3rd place, bronze medalist(s)	Murat Orak	Turkey	38:05
4	Cosmin Gabriel Caldaroiu	Romania	38:18
5	Cesare Maestri	Italy	38:22
6	Bartlomiej Przedwojewski	Poland	38:34
7	Tomasz Grycko	Poland	38:43
8	Sonmez Dag	Turkey	39:01
9	Rafal Matuszczak	Poland	39:01
10	Szabolocs Gyorgy	Romania	39:03

Team

Rank	Team	Athletes	Points
1st place, gold medalist(s)	Turkey	Adem Karagoz, Murat Orak, Sonmez Dag	12
2nd place, silver medalist(s)	Poland	Bartlomiej Przedwojewski, Tomasz Grycko, Rafal Matuszczak, Jakub Rygiel	22
3rd place, bronze medalist(s)	Italy	Cesare Maestri, Dylan Titon, Andrea Pellissero, Marco Barbuscio	32

=== Junior Women ===
Distance 4.5 km, difference in height 500 m, participants 45.

Individual

Rank	Runner	Country	Time
1st place, gold medalist(s)	Lea Einfalt	Slovenia	20:23
2nd place, silver medalist(s)	Cesminaz Yilmaz	Turkey	20:36
3rd place, bronze medalist(s)	Denisa Dragomir	Romania	20:44
4	Sevilay Eytemiz	Turkey	21:13
5	Yasemin Can	Turkey	22:32
6	Laura Rose Donegan	Australia	22:45
7	Faina Ovsyannikova	Russia	22:45
8	Ioana Alina Dan	Romania	22:48
9	Marinela Nineva	Bulgaria	22:49
10	Annabelle Wilson	Australia	22:53

Team

Rank	Team	Athletes	Points
1st place, gold medalist(s)	Turkey	Cesminaz Yilmaz, Sevilay Eytemiz, Yasemin Can	6
2nd place, silver medalist(s)	Romania	Denisa Dragomir, Ioana Alina Dan, Laura Popescu	11
3rd place, bronze medalist(s)	Slovenia	Lea Einfalt, Eva Aljancic, Tina Kozjek	14
