= 2014 World Mountain Running Championships =

- Organisers: WMRA
- Edition: 30th
- Date: 14 September
- Host city: Casette di Massa, Italy
- Events: 6

The 2014 World Mountain Running Championships was the 30th edition of the global mountain running competition, World Mountain Running Championships, organised by the World Mountain Running Association and was held in Casette di Massa, Italy on 14 September 2014.

== Results ==
=== Senior Men ===
Distance 12 km, difference in height 1100 m, participants 155.

Individual race
Rank	Athlete	Country	Time (m:s)
Gold medal	Isaac Kiprop	Uganda	53:50
Silver medal	Daniel Rotich	Uganda	55:10
Bronze medal	Kibet Soyekwo	Uganda	55:24
4	Bernard Dematteis	Italy	55:49
5	Frezgy Tsegay	Eritrea	56:03
6	Abraham Kidane	Eritrea	57:04
7	Petro Mamu	Eritrea	57:14
8	Ahmet Arslan	Turkey	57:47
9	Tesfaldet Negash	Eritrea	57:55
10	Patrick Smyth	United States	57:55

Teams
Rank	Team	Points
Gold medal	Uganda (Isaac Kiprop, Daniel Rotich, Kibet Soyekwo, Nathan Ayeko, James Kibet)	17
Silver medal	Eritrea (Frezgy Tsegay, Abraham Kidane, Petro Mamu, Tesfaldet Negash)	27
Bronze medal	Italy (Bernard Dematteis, Martin Dematteis, Xavier Chevrier, Luca Cagnati, Alex Baldaccini, Tommaso Vaccina)	55

=== Senior Women ===
Distance 9 km, difference in height 710 m, participants 81.

Individual race
Rank	Athlete	Country	Time (m:s)
Gold medal	Andrea Mayr	Austria	45:07
Silver medal	Lucy Wambui Murigi	Kenya	47:49
Bronze medal	Allison McLaughlin	United States	47:55
4	Maude Mathys	Switzerland	48:22
5	Viola Jelagat	Kenya	49:01
6	Patricia Chekwemboi	Uganda	49:11
7	Mateja Kosovelj	Slovenia	49:16
8	Alice Gaggi	Italy	49:55
9	Emma Clayton	United Kingdom	50:11
10	Pavla Schorna	Czech Republic	50:21

Teams
Rank	Team	Points
Gold medal	Italy (Alice Gaggi, Elisa Desco, Antonella Confortola, Renate Rungger)	32
Silver medal	United Kingdom (Emma Clayton, Rebecca Robinson, Mary Wilkinson, Katie Walshaw)	41
Bronze medal	United States (Allison McLaughlin, Megan Deakins, Megan Lund, Juliane Masciana)	62

=== Junior Men ===
Distance 9 km, difference in height 710 m, participants 70.

Individual race
Rank	Athlete	Country	Time (m:s)
Gold medal	Phillip Kipyeko	Uganda	40:51
Silver medal	Ramazan Karagoz	Turkey	42:42
Bronze medal	Ferhat Bozkurt	Turkey	42:53
4	Nadir Cavagna	Italy	44:33
5	Stian Aarvik Overgaard	Norway	44:53
6	Davide Magnini	Italy	45:29
7	Musa Isler	Turkey	45:43
8	Dominik Sadlo	Czech Republic	45:57
9	Hannes Meissel	Austria	46:14
10	Geoffrey Barbe	France	46:32

Teams
Rank	Team	Points
Gold medal	Turkey (Ramazan Karagoz, Ferhat Bozkurt, Musa Isler, Ayhan Saglam)	12
Silver medal	Italy (Nadir Cavagna, Davide Magnini, Henri Aymonod, Luca Ventura)	34
Bronze medal	United Kingdom (Andrew Lawler, Maximilian Nicholls, Jacob Adkin, Max Wharton)	47

=== Junior Women ===
Distance 3.8 km, difference in height 320 m, participants 42.

Individual race
Rank	Athlete	Country	Time (m:s)
Gold medal	Stella Chesang	Uganda	19:23
Silver medal	Sarah Kistner	Germany	20:38
Bronze medal	Michaela Stranska	Czech Republic	21:01
4	Amanda Ortiz	United States	21:17
5	Catriona Graves	United Kingdom	21:23
6	Nada Balcarczyk	Germany	21:24
7	Andreea Alina Piscu	Romania	21:34
8	Marisa Ruskan	United States	21:39
9	Carmen Idris Beshirova	Czech Republic	21:41
10	Olga Nikolaeva	Russia	21:45

Teams
Rank	Team	Points
Gold medal	Germany (Sarah Kistner, Nada Balcarczyk, Annika Seefeld)	8
Silver medal	United States (Amanda Ortiz, Marisa Ruskan, Tabor Scholl)	12
Bronze medal	Czech Republic (Michaela Stranska, Carmen Idris Beshirova, Tereza Korvasova)	12

== Medal table ==
Rank	Nation	Gold	Silver	Bronze	Total
1	Uganda (UGA)	4	1	1	6
2	Italy (ITA)	1	1	1	3
2	Turkey (TUR)	1	1	1	3
4	Germany (GER)	1	1	0	2
5	Austria (AUT)	1	0	0	1
6	United States (USA)	0	1	2	3
7	Great Britain (GBR)	0	1	1	2
8	Eritrea (ERI)	0	1	0	1
8	Kenya (KEN)	0	1	0	1
10	Czech Republic (CZE)	0	0	2	2
Totals (10 entries)		8	8	8	24
