= 2013 World Mountain Running Championships =

- Organisers: WMRA
- Edition: 29th
- Date: 8 September
- Host city: Krynica-Zdrój, Poland
- Events: 4
- Participation: 329 athletes from 39 nations

The 2013 World Mountain Running Championships were held on 8 September in Krynica-Zdrój, Poland. It was the 29th edition of the championships, organised by the World Mountain Running Association (WMRA). The competition featured four races, with senior and junior (under-19) races for both men and women. A total of 329 runners from 39 nations were present at the start of the races.

The men's course was 13.56 km long with an incline of 1,630 m (difference in height of 838 m). The women's and junior men's course had a distance of 9.1 km with an ascent of 1,090 m (difference in height of 561 m). The junior women's race was 4.6 km in length with a climb of 550 m (difference in height of 286 m). Each of the races had an individual and team race element

Ten nations reached the medal table, Italy being the most successful country with three gold medals, two silver medals and one bronze. Uganda followed with two gold medals, one silver medal and one bronze medal. Great Britain won one gold medal, two silver medals and one bronze medal. The USA took one gold medal and one silver medal, the Czech Republic one gold medal. Turkey won one silver and two bronze, Slovenia one silver and Austria, Russia and Ireland with one bronze medal each.

== Results ==
=== Senior men ===
Individual race
Rank	Athlete	Country	Time (m:s)
Gold medal	Philip Kiplimo	Uganda	54:22
Silver medal	Geoffrey Kusuro	Uganda	55:06
Bronze medal	Nathan Ayeko	Uganda	55:19
4	Peter Kibet	Uganda	55:27
5	Bernard Dematteis	Italy	55:44
6	Juan Carlos Carera	Mexico	55:51
7	Joseph Gray	United States	56:25
8	Ahmet Arslan	Turkey	56:26
9	Azeirya Teklay	Eritrea	56:27
10	Martin Dematteis	Italy	56:47

Total: 129 participants

Teams
Rank	Team	Points
Gold medal	Uganda (Philip Kiplimo, Geffrey Kusuro, Nathan Ayeko, Peter Kibet)	10
Silver medal	Italy (Bernard Dematteis, Martin Dematteis, Alex Baldaccini, Gabriele Abate, Luca Cagnati, Xavier Chevrier)	40
Bronze medal	Turkey (Ahmet Arslan, Mehmet Akkoyun, Deniz Kazan, Yavuz Agrali, Emrath Akalin)	82

Total: 19 teams

=== Senior women ===
Individual race
Rank	Athlete	Country	Time (m:s)
Gold medal	Alice Gaggi	Italy	42:47
Silver medal	Emma Clayton	United Kingdom	43:12
Bronze medal	Alisa Desco	Italy	43:32
4	Mateja Kosovelj	Slovenia	43:51
5	Maude Mathys	Switzerland	44:13
6	Sarah McCormack	Ireland	44:23
7	Antonela Confortola	Italy	44:32
8	Sarah Tunstall	United Kingdom	44:40
9	Dominika Wisniewska	Poland	44:46
10	Burcu Buyukbezgin	Turkey	44:53

Total: 79 participants

Teams
Rank	Team	Points
Gold medal	Italy (Alice Gaggi, Alisa Desco, Antonella Confortola, Samantha Galassi)	11
Silver medal	United Kingdom (Emma Clayton, Sarah Tunstall, Mary Wilkinson, Katie Walshaw)	22
Bronze medal	Ireland (Sarah McCormack, Kate Cronin, Sarah Mulligan, Sharon Trimble)	51

Total: 19 teams

=== Junior men ===
Individual race
Rank	Athlete	Country	Time (m:s)
Gold medal	Nekagenet Crippa	Italy	38:58
Silver medal	Ramazan Karagöz	Turkey	39:13
Bronze medal	Manuel Innerhofer	Austria	39:44
4	Dominik Sadlo	Czech Republic	40:10
5	Tomas Lichy	Czech Republic	40:12
6	Brad Traviss	United Kingdom	40:17
7	Jordan Chavez	United States	40:21
8	Yunus Inan	Turkey	40:36
9	Danny Martinez	United States	40:42
10	Michele Vaia	Italy	40:45

Total: 66 participants

Teams
Rank	Team	Points
Gold medal	Czech Republic (Dominik Sadlo, Tomas Lichy, Josef Havlicek, Dominik Kubec)	25
Silver medal	Italy (Nekagenet Crippa, Michele Vaia, Nadir Cavagna, Gianpaolo Crotti)	29
Bronze medal	United Kingdom (Brad Traviss, Maximilian Nicholls, Nathan Jones, Max Wharton)	32

Total: 16 teams

=== Junior women ===
Individual race
Rank	Athlete	Country	Time (m:s)
Gold medal	Mandy Ortiz	United States	22:56
Silver medal	Lea Einfalt	Slovenia	23:07
Bronze medal	Tubay Erdal	Turkey	23:21
4	Annabel Mason	United Kingdom	23:32
5	Georgia Malir	United Kingdom	23:39
6	Catriona Graves	United Kingdom	23:41
7	Akaterina Ivonina	Russia	23:43
8	Dilyana Minkina	Bulgaria	23:48
9	Andrea Alina Piscu	Romania	23:58
10	Michaela Stranska	Czech Republic	24:10

Total: 40 participants

Teams
Rank	Team	Points
Gold medal	United Kingdom (Annabel Mason, Georgia Malir, Catriona Graves)	9
Silver medal	United States (Mandy Ortiz, Tabot Scholl, Emma Abrahamson)	17
Bronze medal	Russia (Akaterina Ivonina, Olga Sharpova, Kristina Boikova)	19

Total: 14 teams

== Medal table ==
Rank	Nation	Gold	Silver	Bronze	Total
1	Italy (ITA)	3	2	1	6
2	Uganda (UGA)	2	1	1	4
3	Great Britain (GBR)	1	2	1	4
4	United States (USA)	1	1	0	2
5	Czech Republic (CZE)	1	0	0	1
6	Turkey (TUR)	0	1	2	3
7	Slovenia (SLO)	0	1	0	1
8	Austria (AUT)	0	0	1	1
8	Ireland (IRL)	0	0	1	1
8	Russia (RUS)	0	0	1	1
Totals (10 entries)		8	8	8	24

== Participating nations ==
- Albania
- Armenia
- Australia
- Austria
- Belarus
- Belgium
- Bulgaria
- Canada
- Colombia
- Croatia
- Czech Republic
- Eritrea
- France
- Great Britain
- Germany
- Hungary
- Ireland
- Israel
- Italy
- Japan
- Macedonia
- Malta
- Mexico
- Monaco
- New Zealand
- Poland
- Portugal
- Romania
- Russia
- San Marino
- Slovakia
- Slovenia
- South Africa
- Switzerland
- Turkey
- Uganda
- Ukraine
- United States
- Venezuela
