= Yasemin Can Arslan =

Turkish long-distance runner (born 1992)

Personal information
- Nationality: Turkish
- Born: Yasemin Can; 1 January 1992 (age 34) Turkey

Sport
- Country: Turkey
- Sport: Long-distance running
- Coached by: Ahmet Arslan
Medal record
Women's Mountain Running
Representing Turkey

Yasemin Can Arslan (née Yasemin Can; born 1 January 1992) is a long-distance runner from Turkey. In her early sport years, she competed in mountain running. She competes in marathon events.

Born on 1 January 1992, Yasemin Can Arslan lives in Alanya district of Antalya Province, Turkey with her spouse Ahmet Arslan, who is also her coach. In her early sport years, she competed in mountain running of Red Bull 400 (2016, 2017). She competes in 15K run, half marathon, and marathon events.

== Achievements ==
Year	Event	Host	Rank
2016	18th Red Bull 400	Germany, Titisee-Neustadt	(gold)
