= 2009 World Mountain Running Championships =

The 25th World Mountain Running Championships were held in Madesimo and Campodolcino, Italy on September 6, 2009. Around 315 athletes from 37 countries competed in this year's event.

== Medals ==
Event	Gold	Silver	Bronze
Senior Men	Geofrey Kusuro; Uganda	Azeria Teklay; Eritrea	James Kibet; Uganda
Senior Women	Valentina Belotti; Italy	Maria Grazia Roberti; Italy	Sarah Tunstall; Great Britain
Junior Men	Xavier Chevrier; Italy	Muzaffer Bayram; Turkey	Alper Demir; Turkey
Junior Women	Yasemin Can; Turkey	Megan Morgan; United States	Angelika Mach; Poland
Team Senior Men	Eritrea	Italy	Turkey
Team Senior Women	Great Britain	Italy	United States
Team Junior Men	Turkey	Italy	Great Britain
Team Junior Women	Turkey	Romania	Poland

== Results ==
=== Men ===
Distance 13.2 km, difference in height 825 m, participants 138.

Rank	Athlete	Country	Time
1	Geofrey Kusuro	Uganda	54:51
2	Azerya Weldemariam	Eritrea	55:45
3	James Kibet	Uganda	55:54
4	Bernard Dematteis	Italy	56:02
5	Zemichael Tesfamichael	Eritrea	56:08
6	Debesay Tsige Behlbi	Eritrea	56:17
7	Jean Baptiste Simukeka	Rwanda	56:17
8	Marco De Gasperi	Italy	56:20
9	Martin Dematteis	Italy	56:34
10	Ahmet Arslan	Turkey	56:34

Team

Rank	Team	Athletes	Points
1st place, gold medalist(s)	Eritrea	Azeria Teklay, Zemichael Tesfamichael, Debesay Tsiege, Teklya Kesete Abraha, Abraham Kidane	25
2nd place, silver medalist(s)	Italy	Bernard Dematteis, Marco De Gasperi, Martin Dematteis, Emanuele Manzi, Gabriele Abate, Marco Gaiardo	39
3rd place, bronze medalist(s)	Turkey	Ahmet Arslan, Mehmet Caglayan, Selahattin Selcuk, Erkan Kus, Ihsan Gani	75

=== Women ===
Distance 8.8 km, difference in height 550 m, participants 68.

Rank	Athlete	Country	Time
1	Valentina Belotti	Italy	43:39
2	Maria Grazia Roberti	Italy	44:03
3	Sarah Tunstall	United Kingdom	44:23
4	Hülya Baştuğ	Turkey	44:57
5	Anna Pichrtová	Czech Republic	44:59
6	Katie Ingram	United Kingdom	44:59
7	Schanna Wokujewa	Russia	45:21
8	Mateja Kosovelj	Slovenia	45:23
9	Brandy Erholtz	United States	45:23
10	Kate Goodhead	United Kingdom	45:24

Team

Rank	Team	Athletes	Points
1st place, gold medalist(s)	United Kingdom	Sarah Tunstall, Katie Ingram, Kate Goodhead, Mary Wilkinson	19
2nd place, silver medalist(s)	Italy	Valentina Belotti, Maria Grazia Roberti, Cristina Scolari, Elisa Desco	24
3rd place, bronze medalist(s)	United States	Brandy Erholtz, Christine Lundy, Megan Kimmel, Megan Lund	35

=== Junior Men ===
Distance 8.8 km, difference in height 550 m, participants 68.

Individual

Rank	Runner	Country	Time
1st place, gold medalist(s)	Xavier Chevrier	Italy	38:26
2nd place, silver medalist(s)	Muzaffer Bayram	Turkey	39:22
3rd place, bronze medalist(s)	Alper Demir	Turkey	39:32
4	Brandon Lord	United States	39:51
5	Luca Cagnati	Italy	40:00
6	Jakub Bajza	Czech Republic	40:09
7	Candide Pralong	Switzerland	40:12
8	Rene Stoeckert	Germany	40:50
9	Nuri Koemuer	Turkey	40:59
10	Kelemu Crippa	Italy	41:23

Team

Rank	Team	Athletes	Points
1st place, gold medalist(s)	Turkey	Muzaffer Bayram, Alper Demir, Nuri Koemuer, Aykut Tasdemir	14
2nd place, silver medalist(s)	Italy	Xavier Chevrier, Luca Cagnati, Kelemu Crippa, Marco Leoni	16
3rd place, bronze medalist(s)	United Kingdom	Alexander Hendry, Robbie Simpson, Scott Mcdonald, Ricky Challinor	52

=== Junior Women ===
Distance 4.3 km, difference in height 275 m, participants 42.

Individual

Rank	Runner	Country	Time
1st place, gold medalist(s)	Yasemin Can	Turkey	22:18
2nd place, silver medalist(s)	Megan Morgan	United States	22:35
3rd place, bronze medalist(s)	Angelika Mach	Poland	22:56
4	Zeynep Yok	Turkey	23:05
5	Özlem Kaya	Turkey	23:15
6	Raluca Morjan	Romania	23:20
7	Andrea Loredana Ologu	Romania	23:38
8	Katerina Berouskova	Czech Republic	23:40
9	Ekaterina Doseykina	Russia	23:42
10	Federica Cerutti	Italy	23:50

Team

Rank	Team	Athletes	Points
1st place, gold medalist(s)	Turkey	Yasemin Can, Zeynep Yok, Özlem Kaya	5
2nd place, silver medalist(s)	Romania	Raluca Morjan, Andrea Loredana Ologu, Cristina Tatucu	13
3rd place, bronze medalist(s)	Poland	Angelika Mach, Katarzyna Dulak, Natalia Waclawska	20
