= Victor Kiplangat =

Ugandan mountain runner

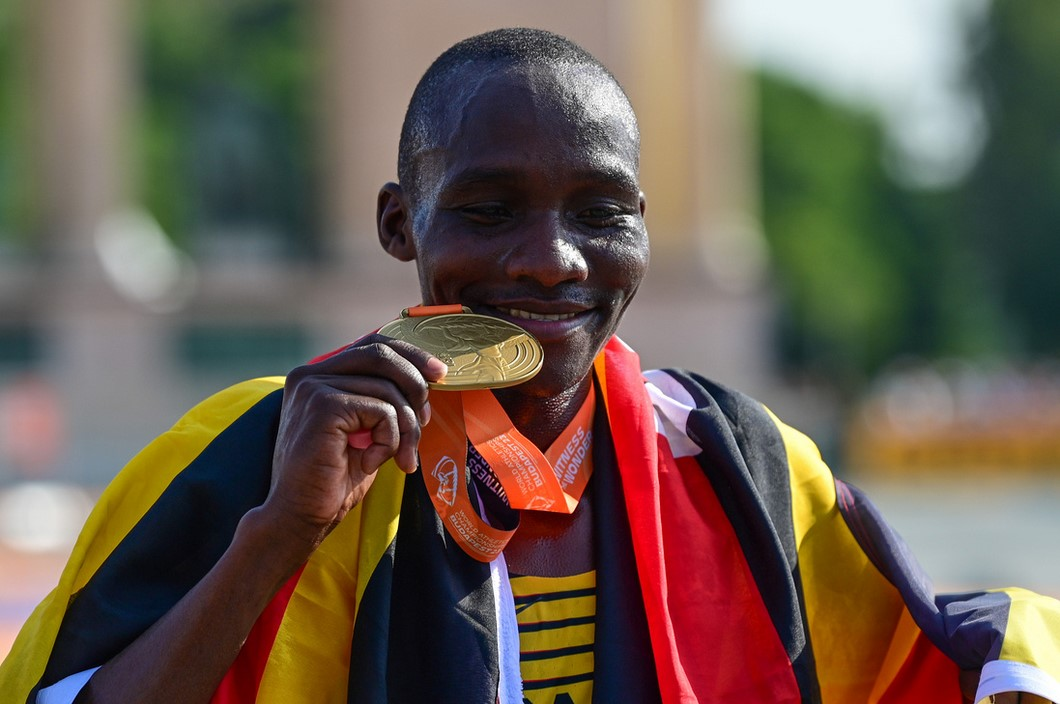
- Kiplangat at the 2023 World Athletics Championships

Personal information
- Nationality: Ugandan
- Born: 10 November 1999 (age 26)

Sport
- Country: Uganda
- Sport: Athletics; Mountain running
- Event: Cross-country running
- Club: U.S. Quercia Trentingrana

Achievements and titles
- Personal best: 3000 m: 8:11.69 (2017)
Medal record
Men's athletics
Representing Uganda
World Championships
Gold medal – first place	2023 Budapest	Marathon
Commonwealth Games
Gold medal – first place	2022 Birmingham	Marathon
Men's mountain running
Representing Uganda
World Championships
Gold medal – first place	2017 Premana	Men's race (13 km)

Victor Kiplangat (born 10 November 1999) is a Ugandan marathon runner, who became world champion in 2023. He won the World Mountain Running Championships in 2017 as a teenager.

In 2022 he won a gold medal at the Commonwealth Games in the men's marathon event, despite taking a wrong turn close to the end of the course. On August 27, 2023 he won the marathon at the 2023 World Athletics Championships in Budapest.

== Achievements ==
Year	Competition	Venue	Position	Event	Time	Notes
Athletics
2016	World U20 Championships	(Poland) Bydgoszcz	19th	5000 m	14:21.22	
2017	Cross Country World Championships	(Uganda) Kampala	19th	Junior men's race (8 km)	24:29	
2022	Commonwealth Games	(United Kingdom) Birmingham	1st	Marathon	2:10:55	
2023	World Athletics Championships	(Hungary) Budapest	1st	Marathon	2:08:53	
Mountain running
2017	World Championships	(Italy) Premana	1st	Men's race (13 km)	52:31	
