= 2017 World Mountain Running Championships =

- Organisers: WMRA
- Edition: 33rd
- Date: 30 July
- Host city: Premana, Italy
- Events: 4

The 2017 World Mountain Running Championships was the 33rd edition of the global Mountain running competition, World Mountain Running Championships, organised by the World Mountain Running Association and was held in Premana, Italy on 30 June 2017.

== Results senior ==
=== Men individual ===
Distance 13.0 km, difference in height 860 m, participants 105.

Rank	Athlete	Country	Time
1st place, gold medalist(s)	Victor Kiplangat	Uganda	52:31
2nd place, silver medalist(s)	Joel Ayeko	Uganda	52:50
3rd place, bronze medalist(s)	Fred Musobo	Uganda	53:57
4.	Joseph Gray	United States	55:35
5.	Petro Mamu	Eritrea	55:45
6.	Xavier Chevrier	Italy	55:47
7.	Bernard Dematteis	Italy	56:04
8.	Patrick Smyth	United States	57:19
9.	Andrew Douglas	United Kingdom	57:32
10.	Robert Penin Surum	Kenya	57:39
11.	Julien Rancon	France	57:45
12.	Martin Dematteis	Italy	57:58
13.	Cesare Maestri	Italy	58:14
14.	Jack Beaumont	New Zealand	58:18
15.	Emmanuel Meyssat	France	58:26
16.	Fabien Demure	France	58:40
17.	Didier Zago	France	58:45
18.	Cesar Costa	Portugal	59:02
19.	Jan Janů	Czech Republic	59:10
20.	Israel Morales	Mexico	59:24

=== Men team ===
Rank	Country	Athletes	Points
1st place, gold medalist(s)	Uganda	Victor Kiplangat, Joel Ayeko, Fred Musobo	1+2+3=6
2nd place, silver medalist(s)	Italy	Xavier Chevrier, Bernard Dematteis, Martin Dematteis	6+7+12=25
3rd place, bronze medalist(s)	United States	Joseph Gray, Patrick Smyth, Brett Hales	4+8+22=34
4.	France	Julien Rancon, Emmanuel Meyssat, Fabien Demure	11+15+16=42

=== Women individual ===
Distance 13.0 km, difference in height 860 m, participants 68.

Rank	Athlete	Country	Time
1st place, gold medalist(s)	Lucy Wambui Murigi	Kenya	1:01:26
2nd place, silver medalist(s)	Andrea Mayr	Austria	1:02:44
3rd place, bronze medalist(s)	Sarah Tunstall	United Kingdom	1:04:16
4.	Maude Mathys	Switzerland	1:06:02
5.	Allie McLaughlin	United States	1:06:06
6.	Adeline Roche	France	1:06:13
7.	Alice Gaggi	Italy	1:07:12
8.	Addie Bracy	United States	1:07:46
9.	Lucie Maršánová	Czech Republic	1:08:42
10.	Pavla Schorná Matyášová	Czech Republic	1:08:53
11.	Ivana Iozzia	Italy	1:09:00
12.	Celia Chiron	France	1:09:08
13.	Kasie Enman	United States	1:09:11
14.	Sara Bottarelli	Italy	1:10:01
15.	Rosa Madureira	Portugal	1:10:06
16.	Silvia Schwaiger	Slovakia	1:10:14
17.	Sarah McCormack	Ireland	1:10:16
18.	Lisa Wirth	Germany	1:10:20
19.	Carla Martinho	Portugal	1:10:36
20.	Katie Walshaw	United Kingdom	1:11:00

=== Women team ===
Rank	Country	Athlete	Points
1st place, gold medalist(s)	United States	Allie McLaughlin, Addie Bracy, Kasie Enman	5+8+13=26
2nd place, silver medalist(s)	Italy	Alice Gaggi, Ivana Iozzia, Sara Bottarelli	7+11+14=32
3rd place, bronze medalist(s)	Czech Republic	Lucie Maršánová, Pavla Schorná Matyášová, Kamila Gregorová	9+10+22=41
4.	France	Adeline Roche, Celia Chiron, Lucie Jamsin	6+12+24=42

== Results junior ==
=== Men individual ===
Distance 6.5 km, difference in height 430 m, participants 60.

Rank	Athlete	Country	Time
1st place, gold medalist(s)	Oscar Chelimo	Uganda	26:46
2nd place, silver medalist(s)	Daniel Pattis	Italy	27:42
3rd place, bronze medalist(s)	Talon Hull	United States	28:01
4.	Dorin Rusu	Romania	28:25
5.	Anthony Ayeko	Uganda	28:27
6.	Abdulselam Bingöl	Turkey	28:30
7.	Jacob Limo	Uganda	28:34
8.	Gabriel Bularda	Romania	28:40
9.	Sylvain Cachard	France	28:52
10.	Adrian Garcea	Romania	28:54
11.	Andrea Prandi	Italy	28:58
12.	Andrea Rostan	Italy	29:16
13.	Ahmet Alkanoğlu	Turkey	29:18
14.	Joshua Boyle	United Kingdom	29:28
15.	Stefano Martinelli	Italy	29:47
16.	Christopher Richards	United Kingdom	29:48
17.	Peter Herman	Romania	29:50
18.	Cesar Gomez	Mexico	29:51
19.	Robin Faricier	France	29:53
20.	Tim Vincent	Australia	29:57

=== Men team ===
Rank	Country	Athlete	Points
1st place, gold medalist(s)	Uganda	Oscar Chelimo, Anthony Ayeko, Jacob Limo	1+5+7=13
2nd place, silver medalist(s)	Romania	Dorin Rusu, Gabriel Bularda, Adrian Garcea	4+8+10=22
3rd place, bronze medalist(s)	Italy	Daniel Pattis, Andrea Prandi, Andrea Rostan	2+11+12=25
4.	Turkey	Abdulselam Bingöl, Ahmet Alkanoğlu, İslam Adli	6+13+27=46

=== Women individual ===
Distance 6.5 km, difference in height 430 m, participants 56.

Rank	Athlete	Country	Time
1st place, gold medalist(s)	Risper Chebet	United States	31:46
2nd place, silver medalist(s)	Bahar Atalay	Turkey	33:02
3rd place, bronze medalist(s)	Lauren Gregory	United States	33:33
4.	Alesia Hecico	Romania	33:35
5.	Gabriela Doroftei	Romania	34:44
6.	Adha Munguleya	Uganda	34:45
7.	Scarlet Dale	United Kingdom	34:46
8.	Heidi Davies	United Kingdom	34:48
9.	Paola Varano	Italy	34:50
10.	Linda Palumbo	Italy	35:09
11.	Quinn McConnell	United States	35:11
12.	Sylvie Štiglerová	Czech Republic	35:20
13.	Bára Stýblová	Czech Republic	35:37
14.	Gaia Colli	Italy	35:44
15.	Irina Boredeianu	Romania	35:55
16.	Soleil Gaylord	United States	36:04
17.	Bára Placatková	Czech Republic	36:28
18.	Iulia Zudor	Romania	36:37
19.	Annabella McQueen	United Kingdom	36:39
20.	Anais Dachet	France	36:45

=== Women team ===
Rank	Country	Athlete	Points
1st place, gold medalist(s)	Romania	Alesia Hecico, Gabriela Doroftei, Irina Boredeianu	4+5+15=24
2nd place, silver medalist(s)	United States	Lauren Gregory, Quinn McConnell, Soleil Gaylord	3+11+16=30
3rd place, bronze medalist(s)	Italy	Paola Varano, Linda Palumbo, Gaia Colli	9+10+14=33
4.	United Kingdom	Scarlet Dale, Heidi Davies, Annabella McQueen	7+8+19=34
