= Bernard Dematteis =

Italian mountain and sky runner

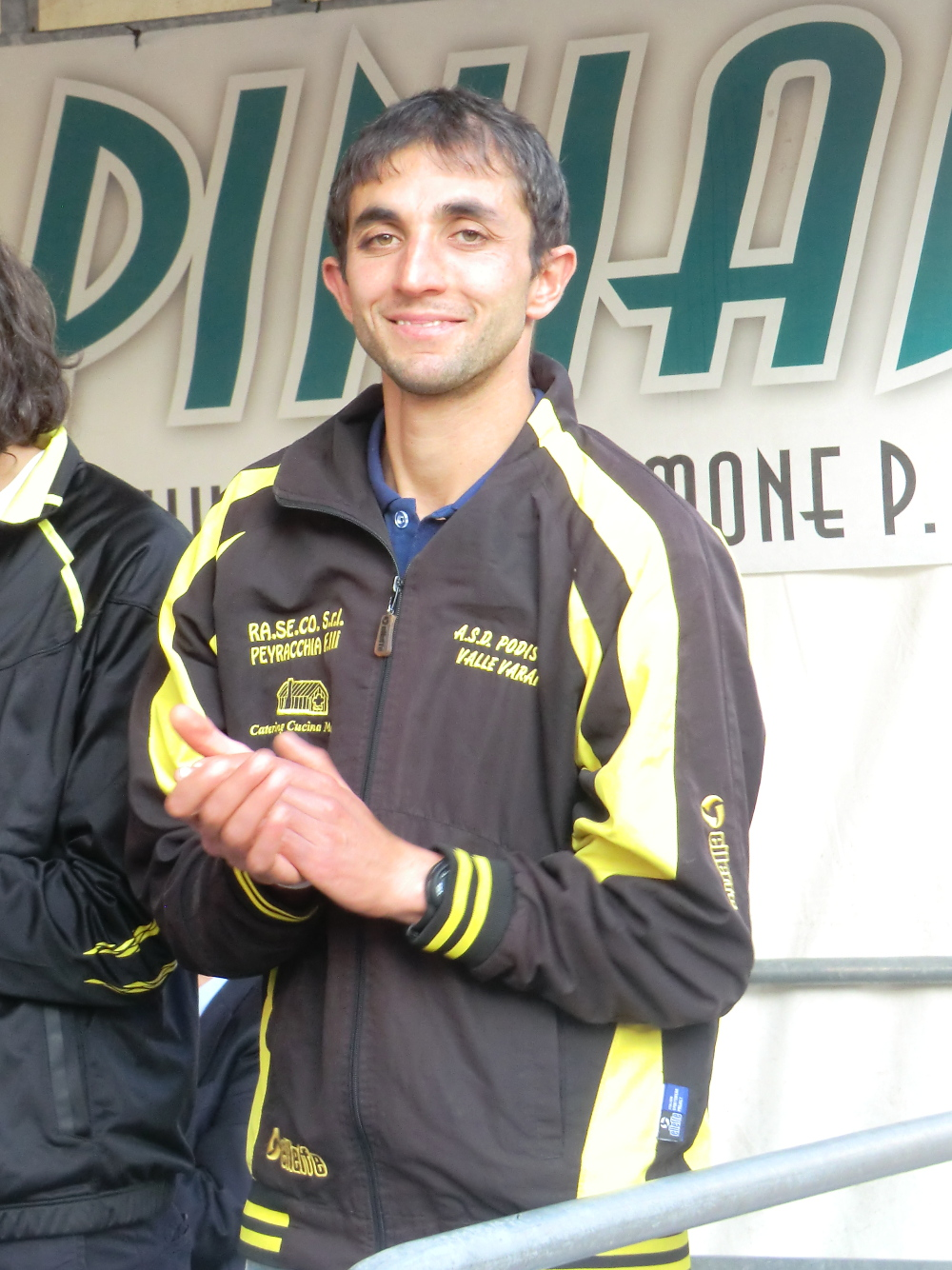

Personal information
- Nickname: Berny
- Nationality: Italian
- Born: 24 April 1986 (age 40) Sampeyre

Sport
- Country: Italy (18 caps)
- Sport: Mountain running Skyrunning
- Club: Corrintime
- Coached by: Paolo Germanetto

Achievements and titles
- Personal best: Marathon: 2:21:56 (2017)
Medal record
Mountain running
Event	1st	2nd	3rd
World Championships (individual)	0	1	0
World Championships (team)	3	6	2
European Championships (individual)	3	2	1
European Championships (team)	11	0	0
Total	17	9	3
World Championships
Gold medal – first place	2008 Sierre	Team
Gold medal – first place	2011 Tirana	Team
Gold medal – first place	2015 Betws-y-Coed	Team
Silver medal – second place	2009 Madesimo	Team
Silver medal – second place	2012 Temù	Team
Silver medal – second place	2013 Krynica-Zdrój	Team
Silver medal – second place	2015 Betws-y-Coed	Individual
Silver medal – second place	2016 Sapareva	Team
Silver medal – second place	2017 Premana	Team
Silver medal – second place	2018 Canillo	Team
Bronze medal – third place	2010 Kamnik	Team
Bronze medal – third place	2014 Casette di Massa	Team
Skyrunning
World Championships
Silver medal – second place	2014 Chamonix	Vertical Kilometer

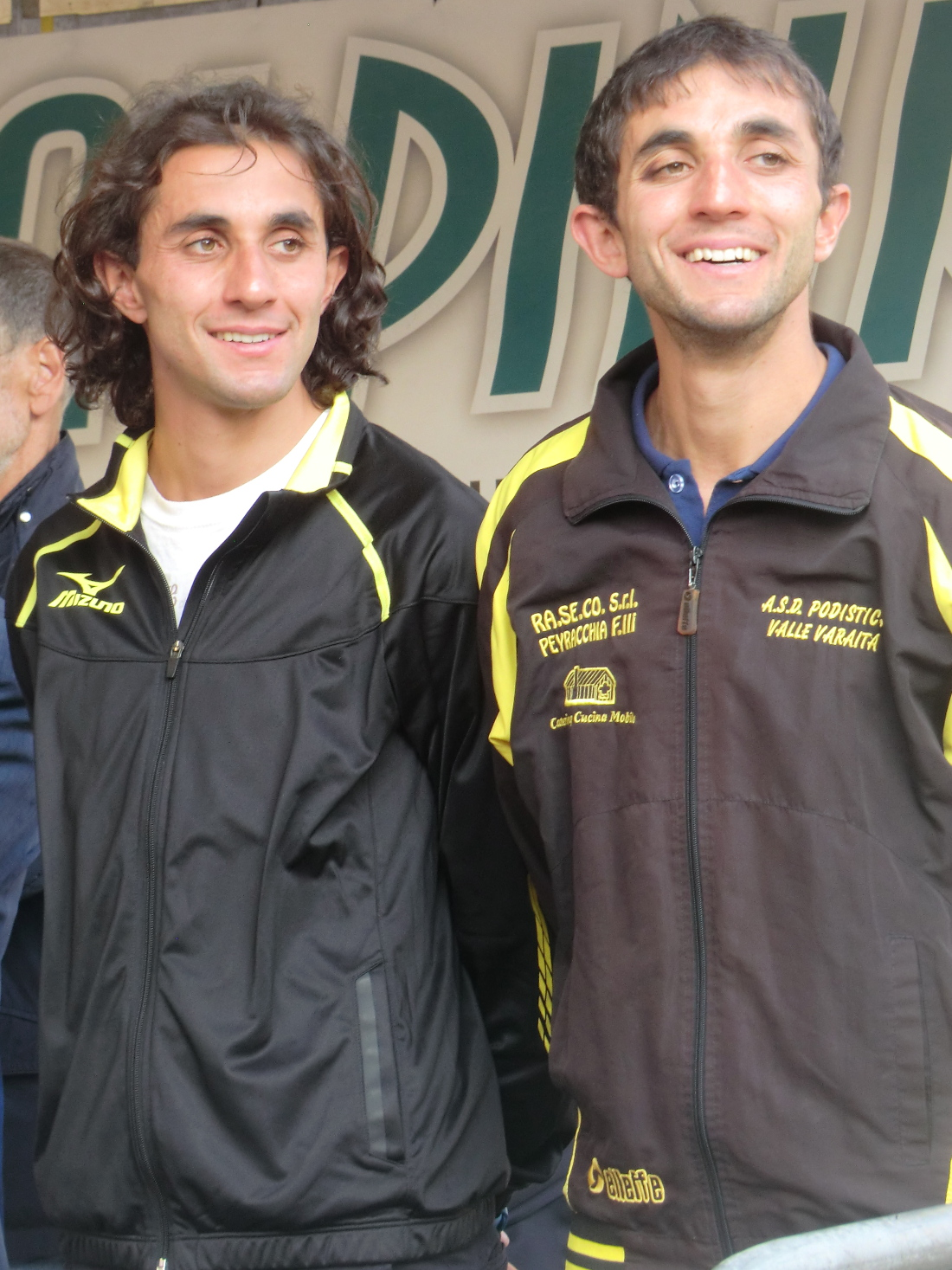
Dematteis twins in 2014.

Bernard Dematteis (born 24 May 1986) is an Italian male mountain runner and sky runner, two times senior individual European champion at European Mountain Running Championships.

== Biography ==
He won 10 medals from 2008 to 2016 at the World Mountain Running Championships (all with the national team) and 14 (five of these at individual level, including two gold medals) at the European Mountain Running Championships.

His twin brother Martin Dematteis is also a mountain runner.

== Achievements ==
Year	Competition	Venue	Position	Event	Time
Mountain running
2008	European Championships	(Germany) Zell am Harmersbach	2nd	Individual	50:29
2008	European Championships	(Germany) Zell am Harmersbach	1st	Team	11 pts
2009	European Championships	(Turkey) Telfes	20th	Individual	1:02:36
2009	European Championships	(Turkey) Telfes	1st	Team	17 pts
2010	European Championships	(Bulgaria) Sapareva Banya	6th	Individual	47:57
2010	European Championships	(Bulgaria) Sapareva Banya	1st	Team	10 pts
2011	European Championships	(Turkey) Uludağ	3rd	Individual	59:41
2011	European Championships	(Turkey) Uludağ	1st	Team	12 ps
2012	European Championships	(Turkey) Pamukkale	19th	Individual	1:06:49
2012	European Championships	(Turkey) Pamukkale	1st	Team	16 ps
2013	European Championships	(Bulgaria) Borovets	1st	Individual	56:30
2013	European Championships	(Bulgaria) Borovets	1st	Team	7 pts
2014	European Championships	(France) Gap	1st	Individual	56:10
2014	European Championships	(France) Gap	1st	Team	11 pts
2015	European Championships	(Portugal) Porto Moniz	7th	Individual	1:03:51
2015	European Championships	(Portugal) Porto Moniz	1st	Team	16 pts
2015	World Championships	(United Kingdom) Betws-y-Coed	2nd	Individual	49:44
2015	World Championships	(United Kingdom) Betws-y-Coed	1st	Team	25 pts
2016	European Championships	(Italy) Arco	2nd	Individual	53:33
2016	European Championships	(Italy) Arco	1st	Team	8 pts
2018	European Championships	(North Macedonia) Skopje	1st	Individual	46:51
2018	European Championships	(North Macedonia) Skopje	1st	Team	6 pts

== National titles ==
- Italian Mountain Running Championships
  - Mountain running: 2008, 2012, 2013, 2014, 2016, 2018 (6)
- Italian Long Distance Mountain Running Championships
  - Long-distance mountain running: 2015
- Italian Vertical Kilometer Championships
  - Vertical kilometer: 2012, 2013 (2)

== See also ==
- Italy at the World Mountain Running Championships
- Italy at the European Mountain Running Championships
