= Italian Vertical Kilometer Championships =

- Sport: Vertical Kilometer
- Founded: Italian Athletics Federation
- First season: 2012
- Country: Italy
- Most recent champions: Bernard Dematteis (men); Elisa Sortini (women)
- Most titles: 3 Bernard Dematteis (men); 3 Valentina Belotti (women)
- Website: FIDAL web site

The Italian Vertical Kilometer Championships (Italian: Campionati italiani di kilometro verticale) are the national championships in vertical kilometer, organised every year by the FIDAL from 2012 (first edition was held in Chiavenna).

== Editions ==
Edition	Year	Date	Venue	Male Champion	Female Champion	Notes
1st	2012	15 July	Chiavenna	Bernard Dematteis	Renate Rungger	
2nd	2013	14 July	Chiavenna	Bernard Dematteis	Valentina Belotti	
3rd	2014	26 July	Colere	Tommaso Vaccina	Antonella Confortola	
4th	2015	18 July	Malonno	Francesco Puppi	Samantha Galassi	
5th	2016	14 May	Casto	Nicola Pedergnana	Valentina Belotti	
6th	2017	29 April	Casto	Patrick Facchini	Valentina Belotti	
7th	2018	6 October	Chiavenna	Bernard Dematteis	Elisa Sortini	

== FISKY Italian Championships ==
The skyrunning specialty of the vertical kilometer was born in 2008, in Italy the Skyrunnig Italian Federation (FISKY) organizes the Skyrunning Italian Championship since 2003, but until 2010 was assigned a single national title, and since 2011 the titles were awarded in the various specialties. For the vertical kilometer these are the winners.

Edition	Year	Dates	Venue	Races	Male Champion	Female Champion	Notes
1st	2011	28 August	Predazzo	1	Urban Zemmer	Erika Forni	
2nd	2012			4	Marco De Gasperi	Debora Cardone	
3rd	2013			3	Marco Facchinelli	Elisa Compagnoni	
4th	2014	31 August	Predazzo	1	Nicola Pedergnana	Stéphanie Jiménez	
5th	2015	26 July	Arabba	1	Manfred Reichegger	Francesca Rossi	
6th	2016	8 July	Cervino	1	Hannes Perkmann	Francesca Rossi	
7th	2017	13 June	Domegge di Cadore	1	Manuel Da Col	Francesca Rossi	
8th	2018	30 September	Valgoglio	1	Patrick Facchini	Elena Nicolini	
