= Martin Dematteis =

Italian mountain and sky runner

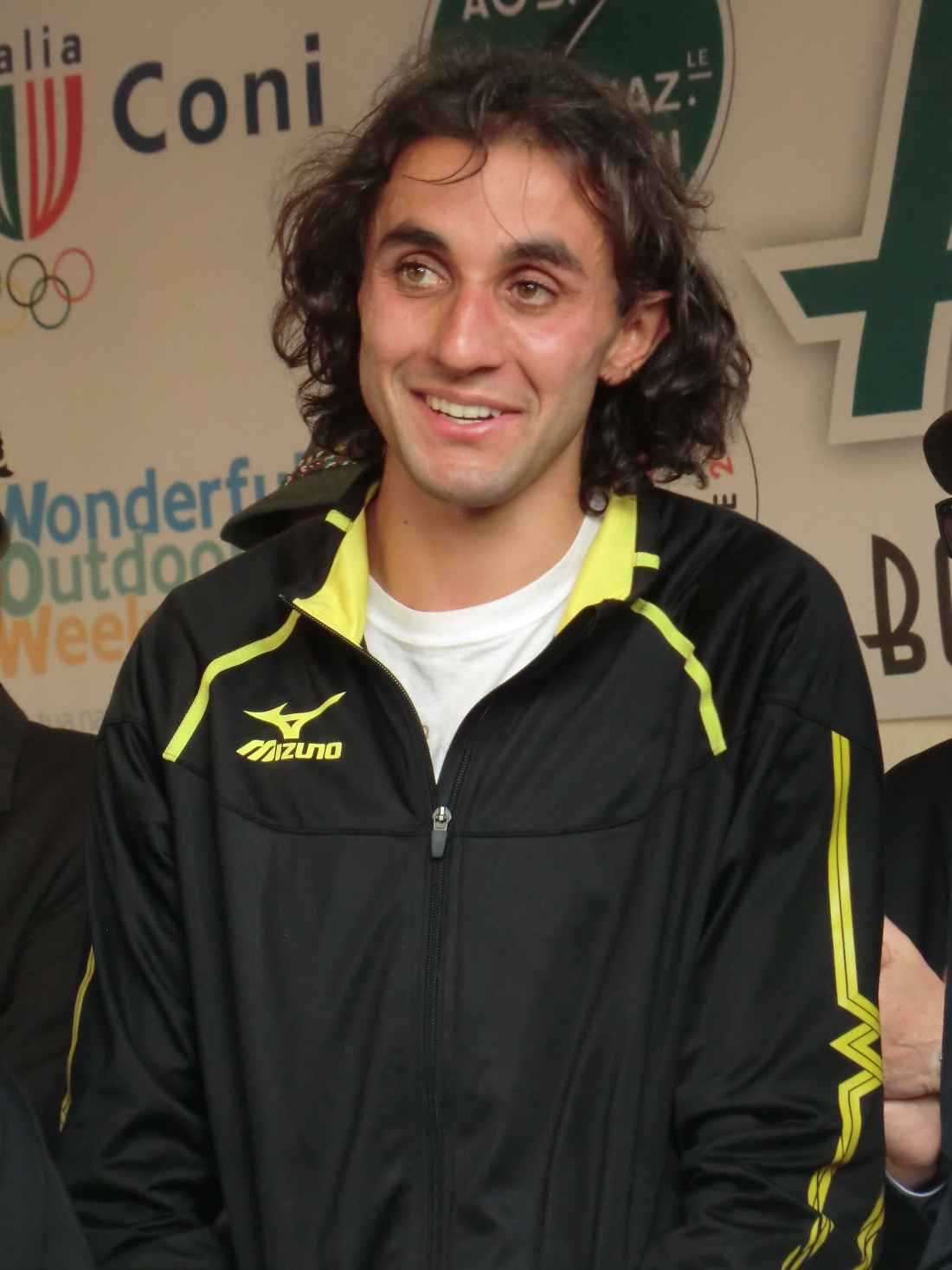

Personal information
- Nationality: Italian
- Born: 24 April 1986 (age 40) Sampeyre

Sport
- Country: Italy (16 caps)
- Sport: Sport of Athletics; Mountain running; Skyrunning
- Club: Corrintime

Achievements and titles
- Personal best: Marathon: 2:18:20 (2016)
Medal record
Sport of Athletics
European Cross Country Championships
Bronze medal – third place	2009 Dublin	Team
Mountain running
Event	1st	2nd	3rd
World Championships (individual)	0	0	1
World Championships (team)	2	5	1
European Championships (individual)	1	1	2
European Championships (team)	7	0	0
Total	10	6	4
World MR Championships
Gold medal – first place	2011 Tirana	Team
Gold medal – first place	2015 Betws-y-Coed	Team
Silver medal – second place	2009 Madesimo	Team
Silver medal – second place	2013 Krynica-Zdrój	Team
Silver medal – second place	2016 Sapareva	Team
Silver medal – second place	2017 Premana	Team
Silver medal – second place	2018 Canillo	Team
Bronze medal – third place	2011 Tirana	Individual
Bronze medal – third place	2014 Casette di Massa	Team
European Championships
Gold medal – first place	2016 Arco	Individual
Silver medal – second place	2010 Sapareva Banya	Individual
Bronze medal – third place	2014 Gap	Individual
Bronze medal – third place	2018 Skopje	Individual

Martin Dematteis (born 24 May 1986) is an Italian male mountain runner and sky runner, one time senior individual European champion at European Mountain Running Championships (2016).

He won a bronze medal in the sport of athletics at senior level with the national team at the 2009 European Cross Country Championships held in Dublin, Ireland.

== Biography ==
He won 8 medals at the World Mountain Running Championships (all with the national team) and 4 at individual level at the European Mountain Running Championships. He also competed at one edition of the IAAF World Cross Country Championships at senior level in 2010.

His twin brother Bernard Dematteis is also a mountain runner.

== Achievements ==
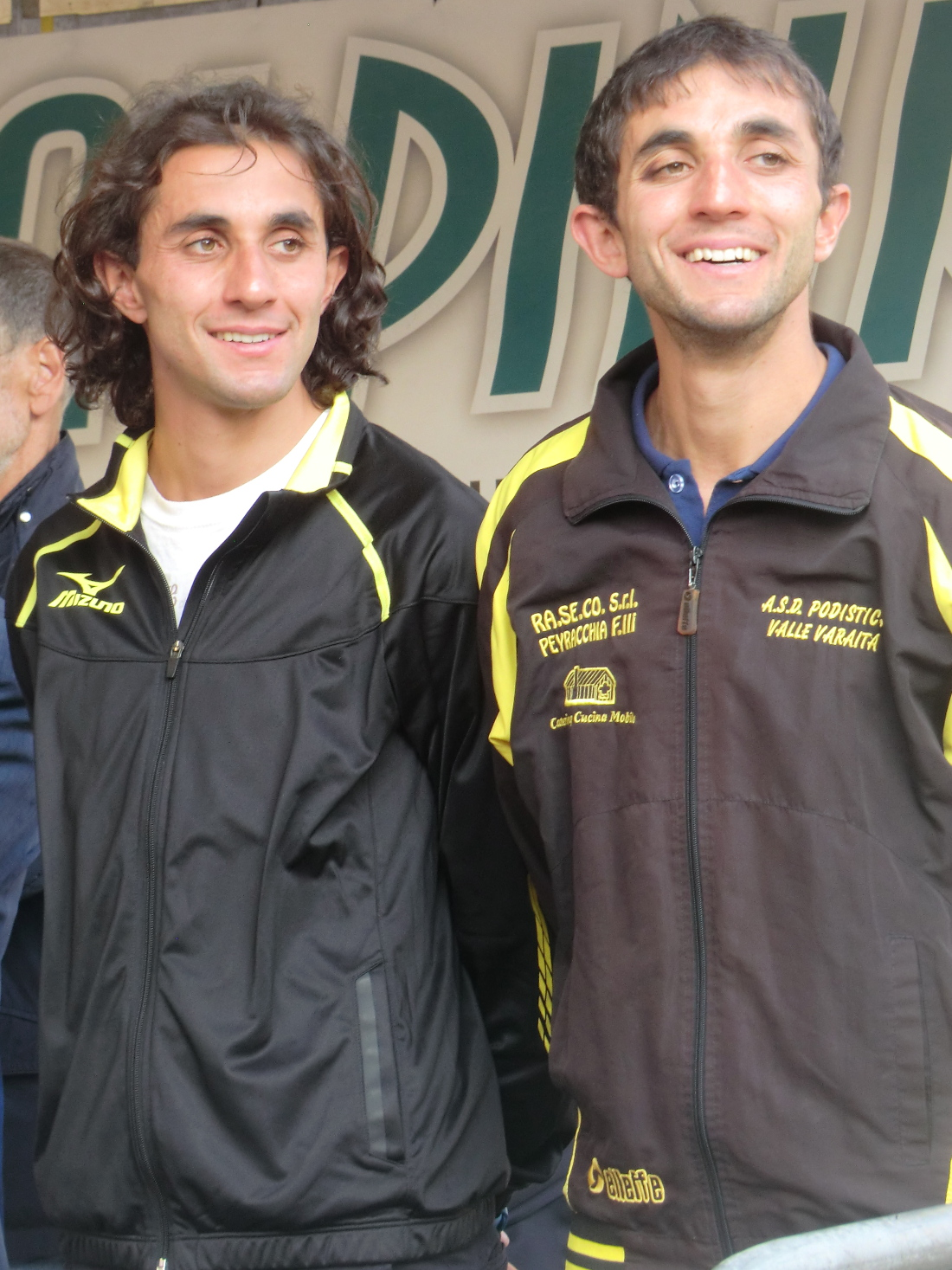
Dematteis twins in 2014.

Mountain running

Competition		2009	2010	2011	2012	2013	2014	2015	2016	2017	2018	2019
World Championships	Individual	9th		3rd place, bronze medalist(s)		10th	13th	4th	8th	11th	8th	
World Championships	Team	2nd place, silver medalist(s)		1st place, gold medalist(s)		2nd place, silver medalist(s)	3rd place, bronze medalist(s)	1st place, gold medalist(s)	2nd place, silver medalist(s)	2nd place, silver medalist(s)	2nd place, silver medalist(s)	
European Championships	Individual	6th	2nd place, silver medalist(s)	23rd		23rd	3rd place, bronze medalist(s)		1st place, gold medalist(s)		3rd place, bronze medalist(s)	
European Championships	Team	1st place, gold medalist(s)	1st place, gold medalist(s)	1st place, gold medalist(s)		1st place, gold medalist(s)	1st place, gold medalist(s)		1st place, gold medalist(s)		1st place, gold medalist(s)	

== National titles ==
- Italian Mountain Running Championships
  - Mountain running: 2009, 2010, 2011 (3)
- Italian Long Distance Mountain Running Championships
  - Long-distance mountain running: 2019 (1)

== See also ==
- Italy at the World Mountain Running Championships
- Italy at the European Mountain Running Championships
