= 2010 European Mountain Running Championships =

- Organisers: EAA
- Edition: 9th
- Date: 4 July 2012
- Host city: Sapareva Banya, Bulgaria
- Events: 4
- Distances: 12.2 km – Men; 9 km – Women; 9 km – Junior men 4.6 km – Junior women
- Participation: 24 nations

The 2010 European Mountain Running Championships were held on 4 July in Sapareva Banya, Bulgaria. They were that year's area championships for mountain running, held by the European Athletic Association in conjunction with the Bulgarian Athletic Federation. The competition featured four races, with senior and junior races for both men and women. The 2010 competition featured an uphill–downhill course format. A total of 237 runners from 24 nations started the competition and two further nations (Norway and Greece) were present as observers.

The men's race was 12.2 km long and featured an ascent and descent of 685 m on each of its three laps. The women's and junior men's races were 9 km long comprising two laps with a rise and fall of 495 m. The junior women's race was one lap of 4.6 km over a hill of 235 m.

Ahmet Arslan took his fourth consecutive men's title by some distance, while Italians Martin Dematteis and Marco De Gasperi completed the podium and helped Italy retain its undefeated streak in the men's team competition. The 2010 Grand Ballon race winner Marie Laure Dumergues took the women's title continuing her good form in a breakthrough year. Valentina Belotti was the women's runner-up for a second year running and Elena Nagovitsyna was the bronze medallist. Hüseyin Pak won the junior men's race while Denisa Dragomir was the women's junior champion.

== Results ==
=== Men ===
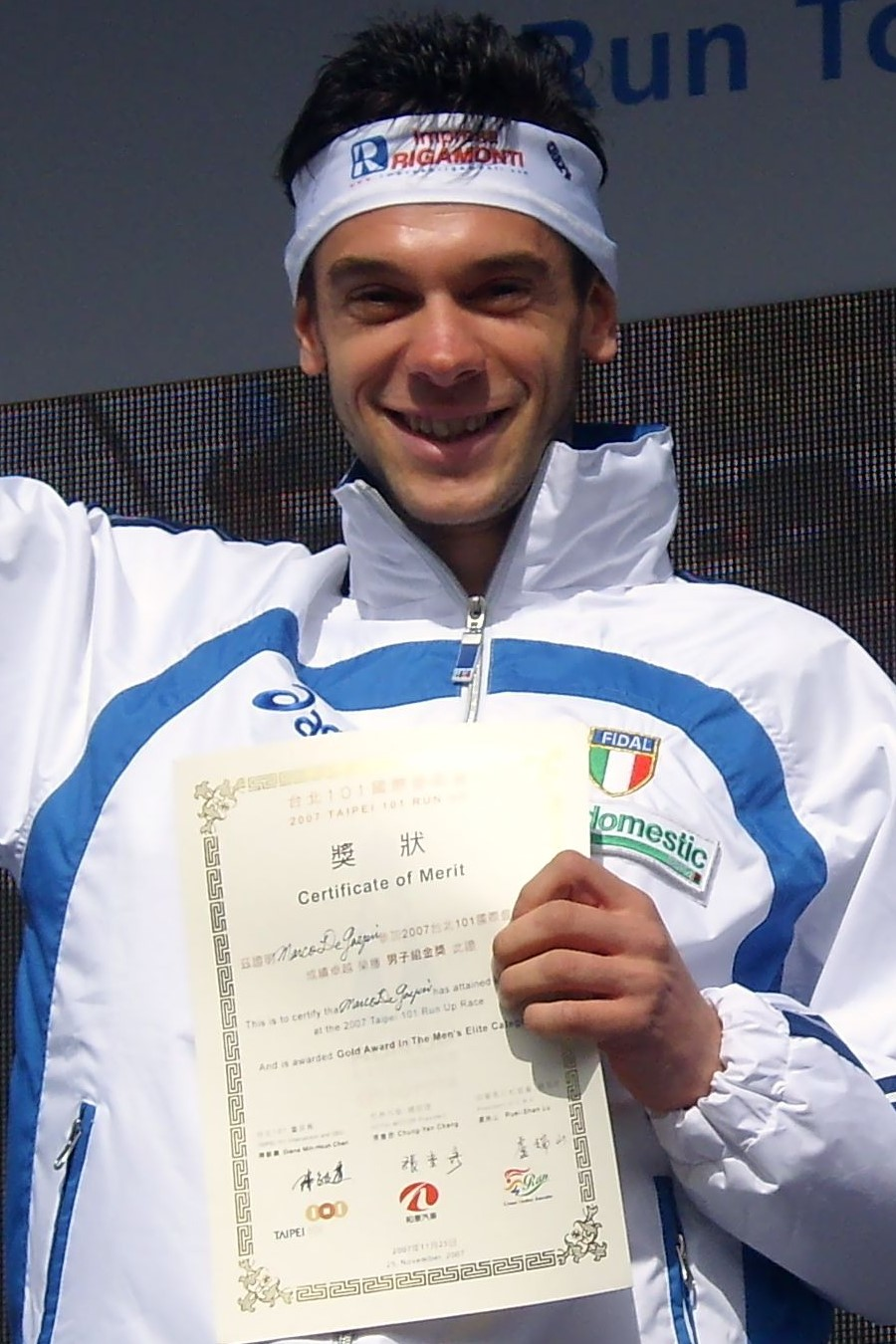
Marco De Gasperi reached the podium for the fourth consecutive time.

Rank	Athlete	Country	Time (m:s)
Gold medal	Ahmet Arslan	Turkey	46:14
Silver medal	Martin Dematteis	Italy	46:40
Bronze medal	Marco De Gasperi	Italy	47:19
4	Julien Rancon	France	47:22
5	Gabriele Abate	Italy	47:42
6	Bernard Dematteis	France	47:57
7	Abdülkadir Türk	Turkey	48:10
8	Emmanuel Meyssat	France	48:29

Teams
Rank	Team	Points
Gold medal	Italy	10
Silver medal	France	30
Bronze medal	Spain	38
4	Turkey	41
5	Portugal	42

- Totals: 80 starters, 78 finishers, 19 national teams.

=== Women ===
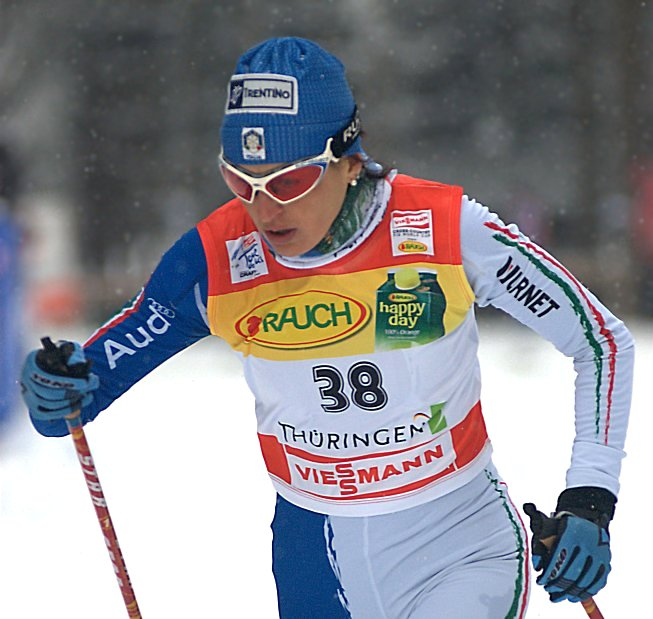
Italian cross-country skier Antonella Confortola came in fourth place.

Rank	Athlete	Country	Time (m:s)
Gold medal	Marie Laure Dumergues	France	39:13
Silver medal	Valentina Belotti	Italy	39:29
Bronze medal	Yelena Nagovichina	Russia	39:44
4	Antonella Confortola	Italy	40:11
5	Lucija Krkoc	Slovenia	40:17
6	Cristina Scolari	Slovenia	40:33
7	Milka Mihaylova	Bulgaria	40:36
8	Carla Martinho	Portugal	40:56

Teams
Rank	Team	Points
Gold medal	Italy	12
Silver medal	France	37
Bronze medal	Russia	39
4	Bulgaria	41
5	United Kingdom	47

- Totals: 64 starters, 60 finishers, 13 national teams.

=== Junior men ===
Rank	Athlete	Country	Time (m:s)
Gold medal	Hüseyin Pak	Turkey	33:15
Silver medal	Sebahattin Yildirimci	Turkey	33:43
Bronze medal	Jente Joly	Belgium	34:09
4	Paolo Ruatti	Italy	34:18
5	Andrea Debiasi	Italy	34:22

Teams
Rank	Team	Points
Gold medal	Turkey	11
Silver medal	Italy	34
Bronze medal	United Kingdom	35

- Totals: 59 starters, 58 finishers, 15 national teams.

=== Junior women ===
Rank	Athlete	Country	Time (m:s)
Gold medal	Denisa Ionela Dragomir	Romania	18:28
Silver medal	Yagmur Tarhan	Turkey	19:13
Bronze medal	Anastasiya Mikhaylova	Russia	19:25
4	Burcu Dag	Turkey	19:35
5	Letizia Titon	Italy	19:36

Teams
Rank	Team	Points
Gold medal	Turkey	6
Silver medal	Russia	10
Bronze medal	Romania	12

- Totals: 39 starters, 38 finishers, 12 national teams.

== Participation ==
A total of 24 nations had athletes which took part in the 2010 Championships. On top of this, Norway and Greece had observers present.

- Armenia
- Austria
- Belgium
- Bulgaria
- Croatia
- Czech Republic
- France
- Germany
- United Kingdom
- Ireland
- Israel
- Italy
- Latvia
- Macedonia
- Poland
- Portugal
- Romania
- Russia
- Slovenia
- Spain
- Switzerland
- Serbia
- Turkey
- Ukraine
