= Samson Kiflemariam =

Eritrean long-distance runner

Personal information
- Full name: Samson Kiflemariam Gashazghi
- Nationality: Eritrean
- Born: 23 January 1984 (age 42) Quazien, Ethiopia
- Height: 1.68 m (5 ft 6 in)
- Weight: 54 kg (119 lb)

Sport
- Country: Eritrea
- Sport: Athletics; Mountain running

Achievements and titles
- Personal bests: 5000 m: 13:21.43 (2004); Marathon: 2:11:56 (2013)

Samson Kiflemariam Gashazghi (born 23 January 1984) is an Eritrean long-distance runner who specializes in the 5000 metres, cross-country running, but as mountain runner he won 2010 World Mountain Running Championships.

== Biography ==
He was born in Quazien. As a junior, he competed in the junior races at the IAAF World Cross Country Championships, finishing 19th in 2002 and 24th in 2003. He finished tenth in the 10,000 metres at the 2002 World Junior Championships and twelfth in the same event at the 2002 African Championships.

On the track he competed in the 5000 metres at the 2004 Olympic Games and the 2005 World Championships without reaching the final. He concentrated more on road running and cross-country. He finished fifteenth at the 2004 World Half Marathon Championships and sixteenth at the 2007 World Road Running Championships. At the World Cross Country Championships he finished 29th in 2004, 17th in 2005, 19th in 2006, 32nd in 2007 and 22nd in 2009. The Eritrean team took bronze medals in the team competition in 2004 and 2009.

His personal best times are 13:21.43 minutes in the 5000 metres, achieved in June 2004 in Seville; 28:08.97 minutes in the 10,000 metres, achieved in June 2005 in Prague; and 1:0:52 hours in the half marathon, achieved in October 2007 in Udine.

== Question about surname ==
Samson Kiflemarian has a third name, as often in Africa, and it is Gashazghi. The Mountain World Champion is, therefore, Samson "Gashazghi" Kiflemarian. In the reports of the World Mountain Running Association (WMRA), for 2010 World Mountain Running Championships he is only Samson Gashazghi. Whereas in the profiles of the International Association of Athletics Federations (IAAF) and Sports Reference results in Samson Kiflemariam. However, from the Beijing Marathon 2013 reports it is clear that his full name is Samson Kiflemariam Gashazghi.

== Achievements ==
Year	Competition	Venue	Position	Event	Time	Notes
Athletics
2004	Olympic Games	(Greece) Athens	Heat	5000 metres	13:26.97	
2005	World Championships	(Finland) Helsinki	Heat	5000 metres	13:31.05	SB
Mountain running
2010	World championships	(Slovenia) Kamnik	1st	Men's race (12 km)	56:25	
