= Nekagenet Crippa =

Italian middle-distance runner

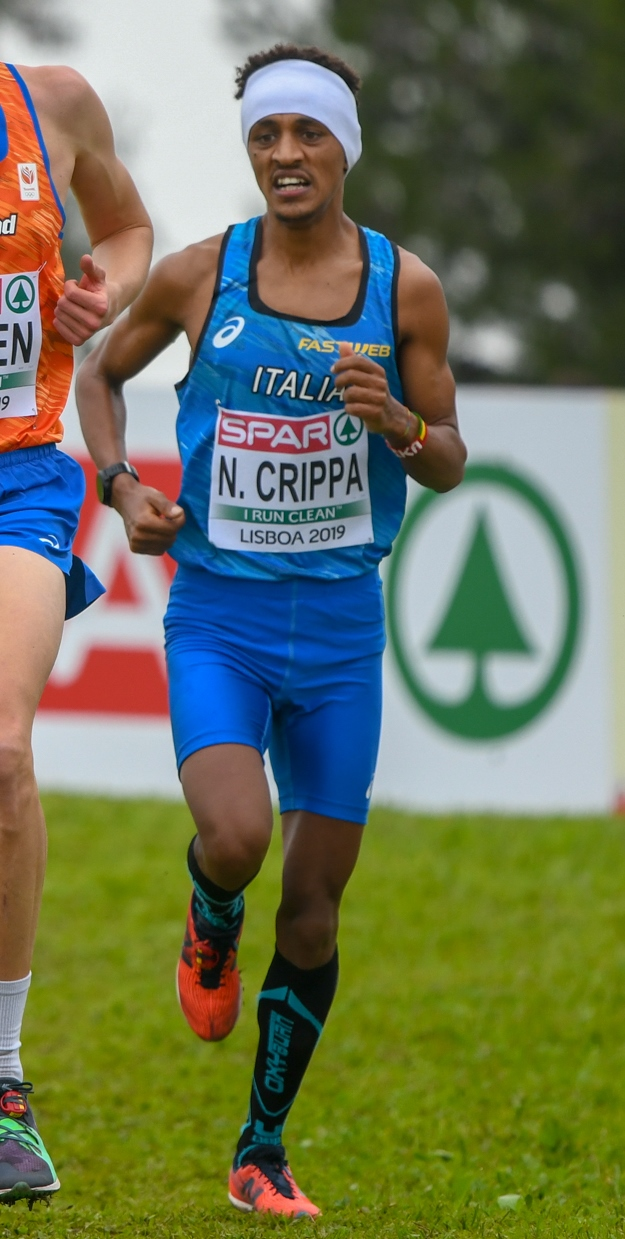
- Crippa at the 2019 European Cross Country Championships.

Personal information
- National team: Italy: 3 caps (2019-2021)
- Born: 16 September 1994 (age 31) Dessie, Ethiopia
- Height: 1.69 m (5 ft 7 in)
- Weight: 52 kg (115 lb)

Sport
- Sport: Athletics
- Events: Middle-distance running Cross-country running
- Club: C.S. Esercito
- Coached by: Roberto Furlanic

Achievements and titles
- Personal bests: 5000 m: 14:00.87 (2019); 10,000 m: 27:51.93 (2021); Half marathon: 1:03:23 (2020)
Medal record
Senior level
European Cross Country Championships
Bronze medal – third place	2018 Tilburg	Team
Youth level
World Mountain Running Championships
Gold medal – first place	2013 Krynica-Zdrój	Individual
Silver medal – second place	2013 Krynica-Zdrój	Team

Nekagenet Crippa (born 16 September 1994) is an Ethiopian-born Italian middle distance runner and cross-country runner who won a national title in 2019 and at senior level.

He his the older brother of the middle-distance runner and Italian national recordman Yemaneberhan Crippa.

== Career ==
Junior mountain running world champion in 2013, he stopped athletics due to an injury. He returned to competitions in 2018 at the age of 24, immediately achieving good results such as an Italian title in the half marathon and a team bronze at the European cross-country running.

== Achievements ==
Year	Competition	Venue	Rank	Event	Time	Notes
2018	European Cross Country Championships	(Netherlands) Tilburg	20th	Senior race	29:47	
2018	European Cross Country Championships	(Netherlands) Tilburg	3rd	Team	37 pts	
2019	European Cross Country Championships	(Portugal) Lisbon	42nd	Senior race	32:00	
2019	European Cross Country Championships	(Portugal) Lisbon	10th	Team	88 pts	
2020	World Half Marathon Championships	(Poland) Gdynia	DNF	Half marathon	no time	
2021	European 10,000m Cup	(United Kingdom) Birmingham	9th	10,000 m	27:51.93	PB
2021	European 10,000m Cup	(United Kingdom) Birmingham	4th	10,000 m team	1:24:56.76	

== National titles ==
Crippa won a national championship at individual senior level.

- Italian Athletics Championships
  - Half marathon: 2019

== See also ==
- Italian team at the running events
