= Addie Bracy =

American long-distance runner

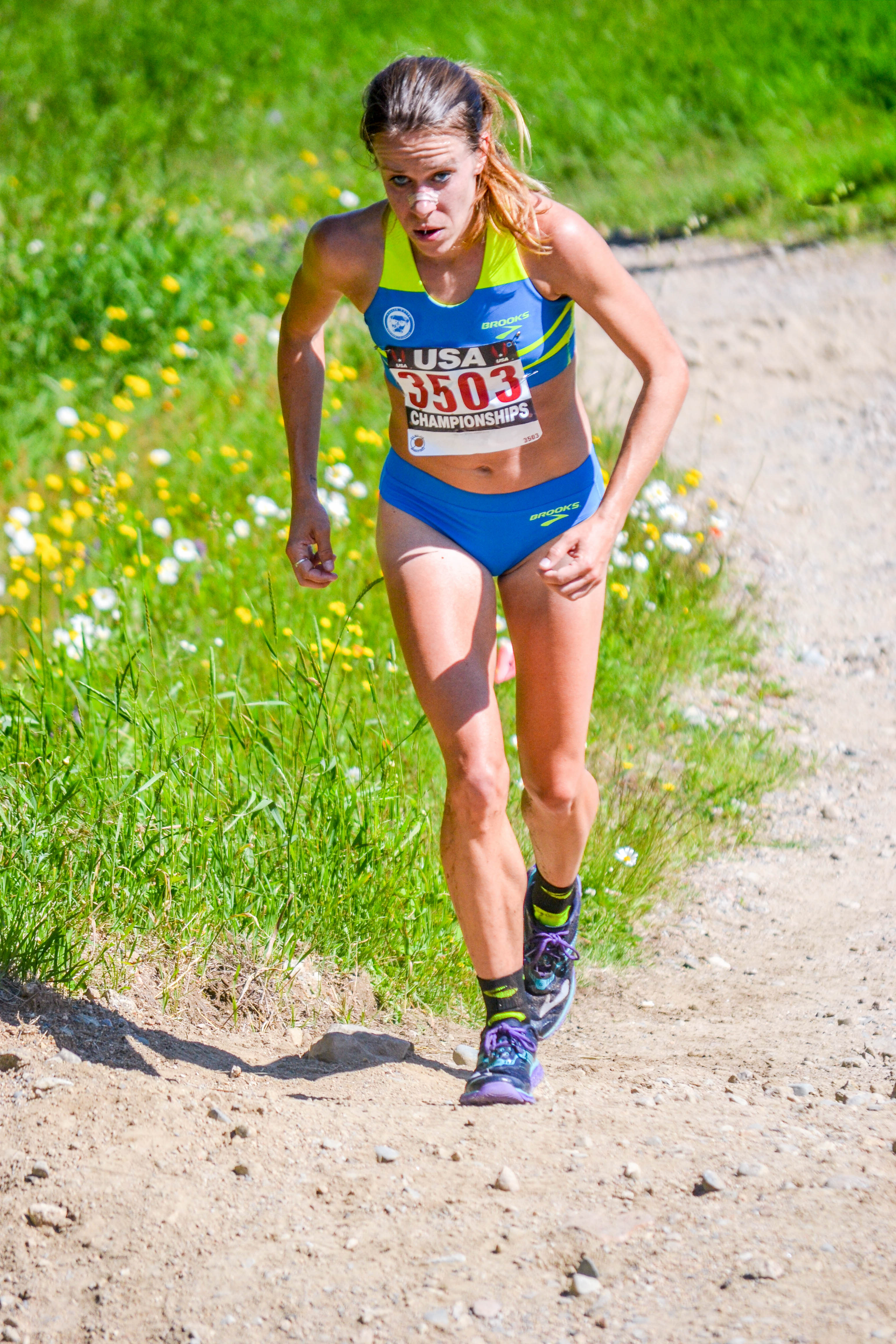
Medal record
Women's Mountain running
Representing the United States
World Mountain Running Championships
Bronze medal – third place	2016 Sapareva Banya	Women's Team
Gold medal – first place	2017 Premana	Women's Team

Addie Bracy is an American mountain runner. She finished in 8th place individually, and won team gold, at the 2017 World Mountain Running Championships. She is also a three-time USA Track & Field National Champion and a three-time USA Track & Field Women's Mountain Runner of the Year.

She was a U.S. Olympic Trials qualifier in both the 10000 meters and the marathon.

After her running career on the track, she won her debut trail race at the 2016 U.S. Mountain Running Championships.

In addition to mountain running, Bracy competes in ultramarathons. She was rated as the 10th best ultrarunner in 2021 by Ultra Running Magazine and won the 2022 Speedgoat.
