= Patrick Smyth (runner) =

American long-distance runner

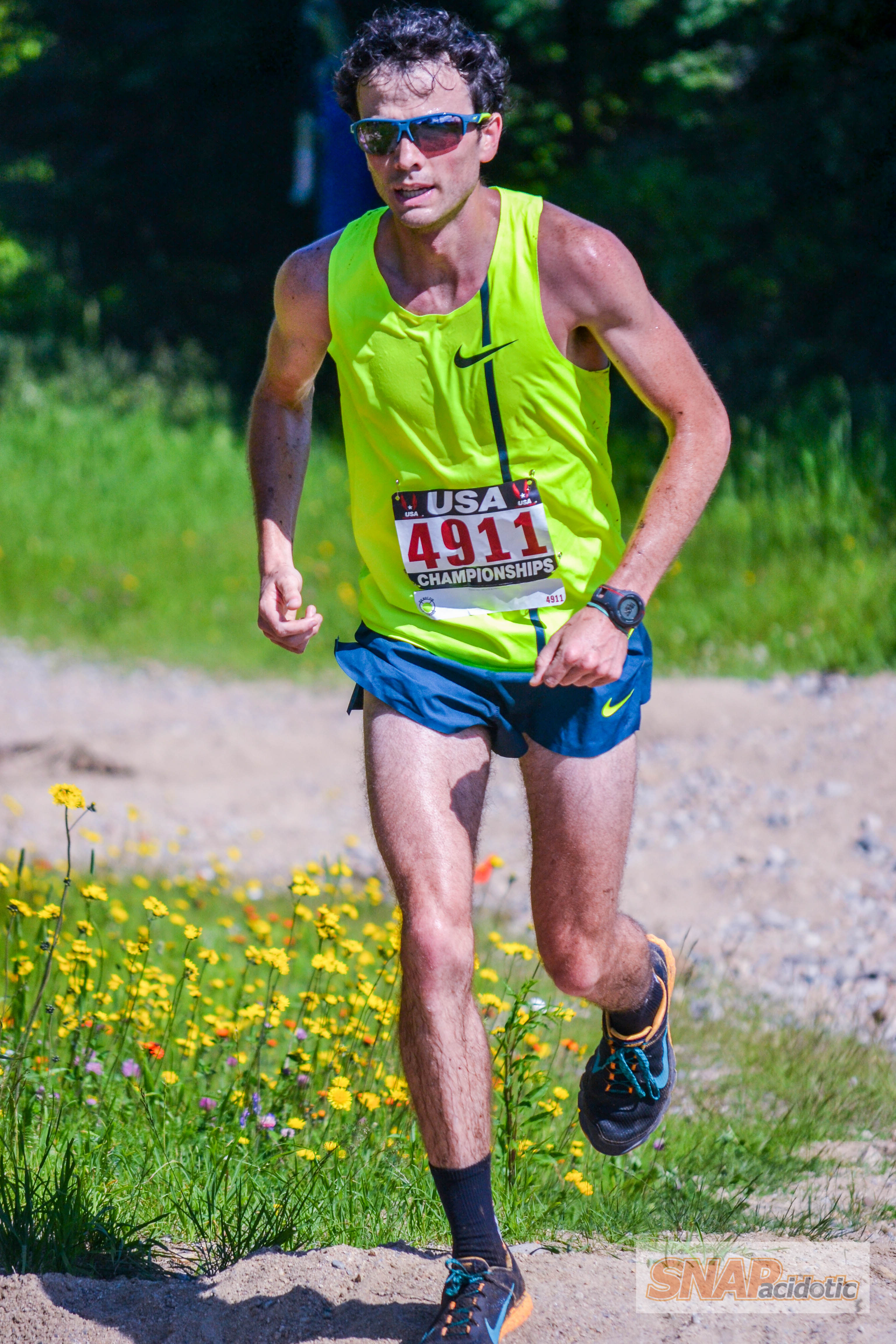
- Smyth in a 2014 race tournament

Personal information
- Born: August 6, 1986 (age 39)
Medal record
Men's Mountain running
Representing the United States
World Mountain Running Championships
Bronze medal – third place	2017 Premana	Men's Senior Team

Patrick Smyth (born August 6, 1986) is an American long distance runner from Salt Lake City. He had retired in 2020, but came back to competition in 2023.

== College career ==
Smyth was a seven-time All-American and three-time Big East Conference champion. While at the University of Notre Dame he set a 10,000-meter school record of 28:25.85 and ranked 11th at the 2008 NCAA Championships in cross-country. He also finished 4th nationally in the 10,000-meter race.

== International career ==
Smyth competed in the 2010 IAAF World Cross Country Championships and the 2015 IAAF World Cross Country Championships.

He was also the 2013, 2014, and 2015 XTERRA trail running champion.

Smyth earned a team bronze medal, and finished 8th individually, at the 2017 World Mountain Running Championships.
