= Ádám Kovács =

Ádám Kovács may refer to:

- Ádám Kovács (footballer) (born 1991), Hungarian footballer
- Ádám Kovács (karateka) (born 1981), Hungarian karateka
