= Tauplitz =

- Former municipality
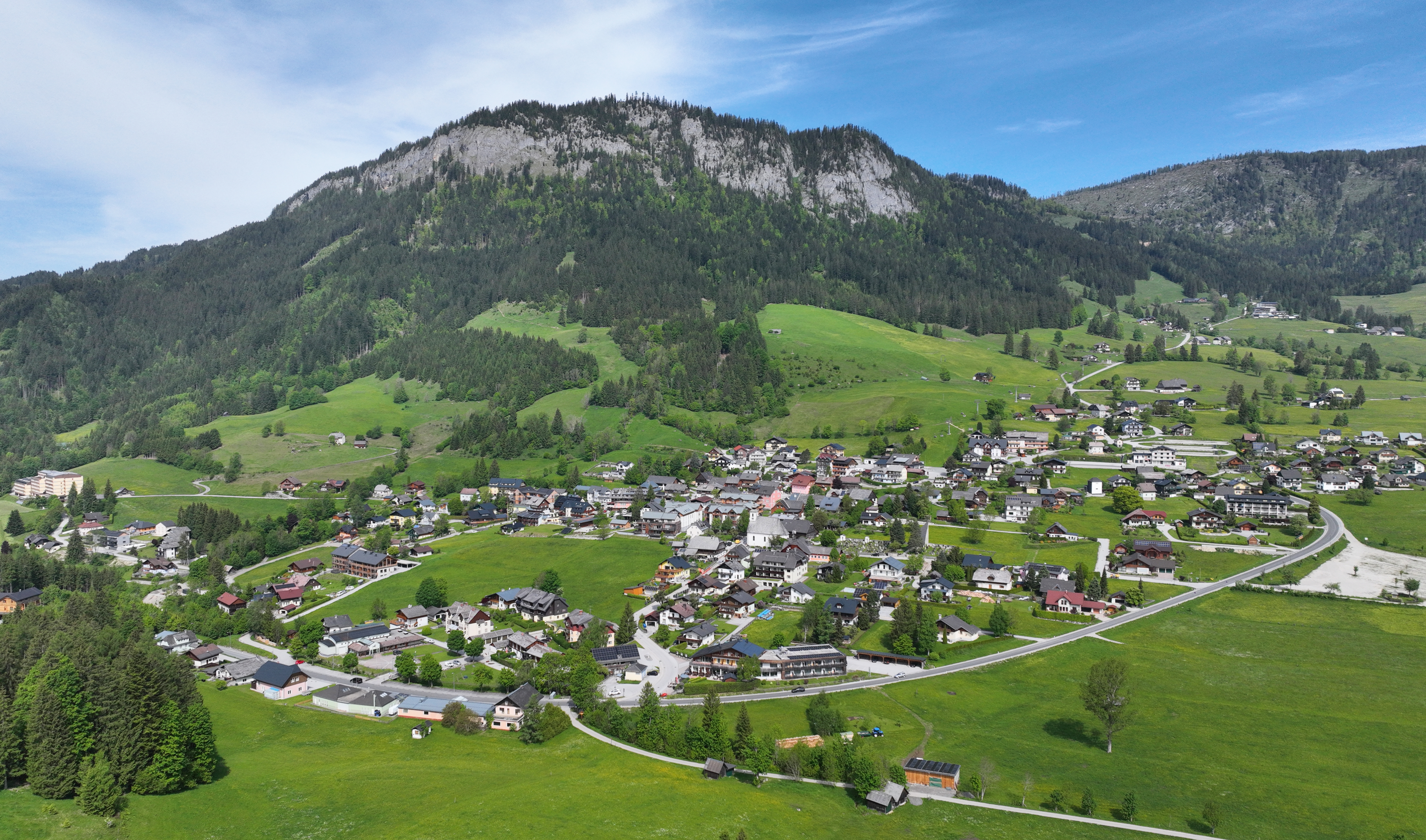
- Southeast view of Tauplitz

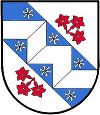
- Coat of arms

- Location within Austria
- Coordinates: 47°37′00″N 14°00′00″E
- Country: Austria
- State: Styria
- District: Liezen

Area
  - Total: 53.9 km^{2} (20.8 sq mi)
- Elevation: 896 m (2,940 ft)

Population (1 January 2016)
  - Total: 1,005
  - Density: 18.6/km^{2} (48.3/sq mi)
- Time zone: UTC+1 (CET)
  - Summer (DST): UTC+2 (CEST)
- Postal code: 8982
- Area code: 03688
- Vehicle registration: LI
- Website: www.dietauplitz.com

Tauplitz is a former municipality in the district of Liezen in the Austrian state of Styria. Since the 2015 Styria municipal structural reform, it is part of the municipality Bad Mitterndorf.

== Population ==
Historical population
Year	Pop.	±%
1869	692	—
1880	645	−6.8%
1890	644	−0.2%
1900	712	+10.6%
1910	653	−8.3%
1923	702	+7.5%
1934	630	−10.3%
1939	737	+17.0%
1951	737	+0.0%
1961	866	+17.5%
1971	1,096	+26.6%
1981	1,056	−3.6%
1991	1,074	+1.7%
2001	1,002	−6.7%
2013	995	−0.7%

== Activities ==
=== Skiing ===
The Tauplitz ski area encompasses 43 piste kilometres across three mountains – the Mitterstein, Lawinenstein and Schneiderkogel. It is part of the wider 120km for the whole Schneebären area that includes 120 piste kilometres. The ski runs in the resort cater to all levels; 18 kilometres are for beginners (blue), 19 kilometres for intermediate (red) and 6 kilometres for the more advanced skiers (black) There are also 130 kilometres of cross-country trails in the area.

=== Lakes on the Tauplitzalm ===
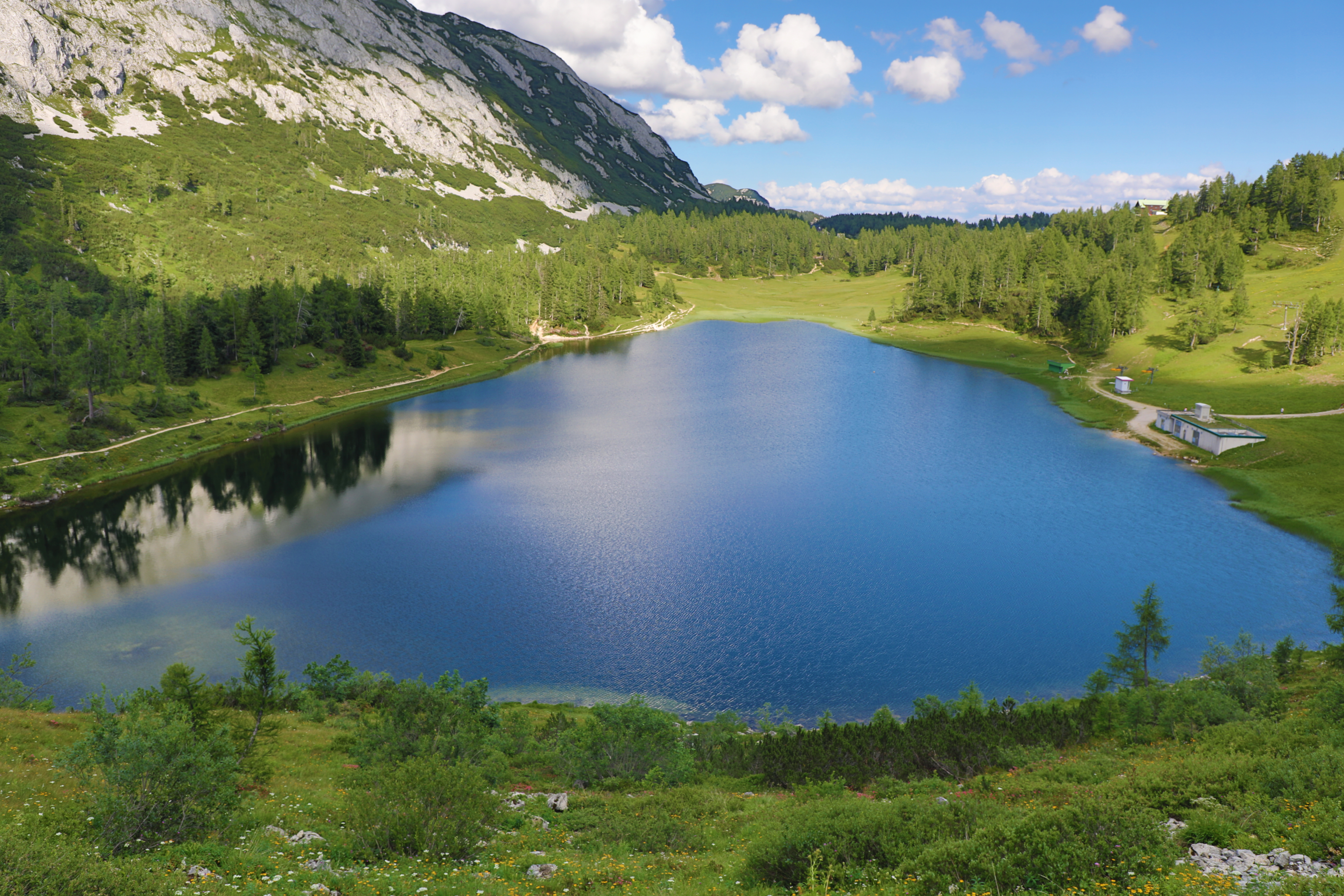
Großsee

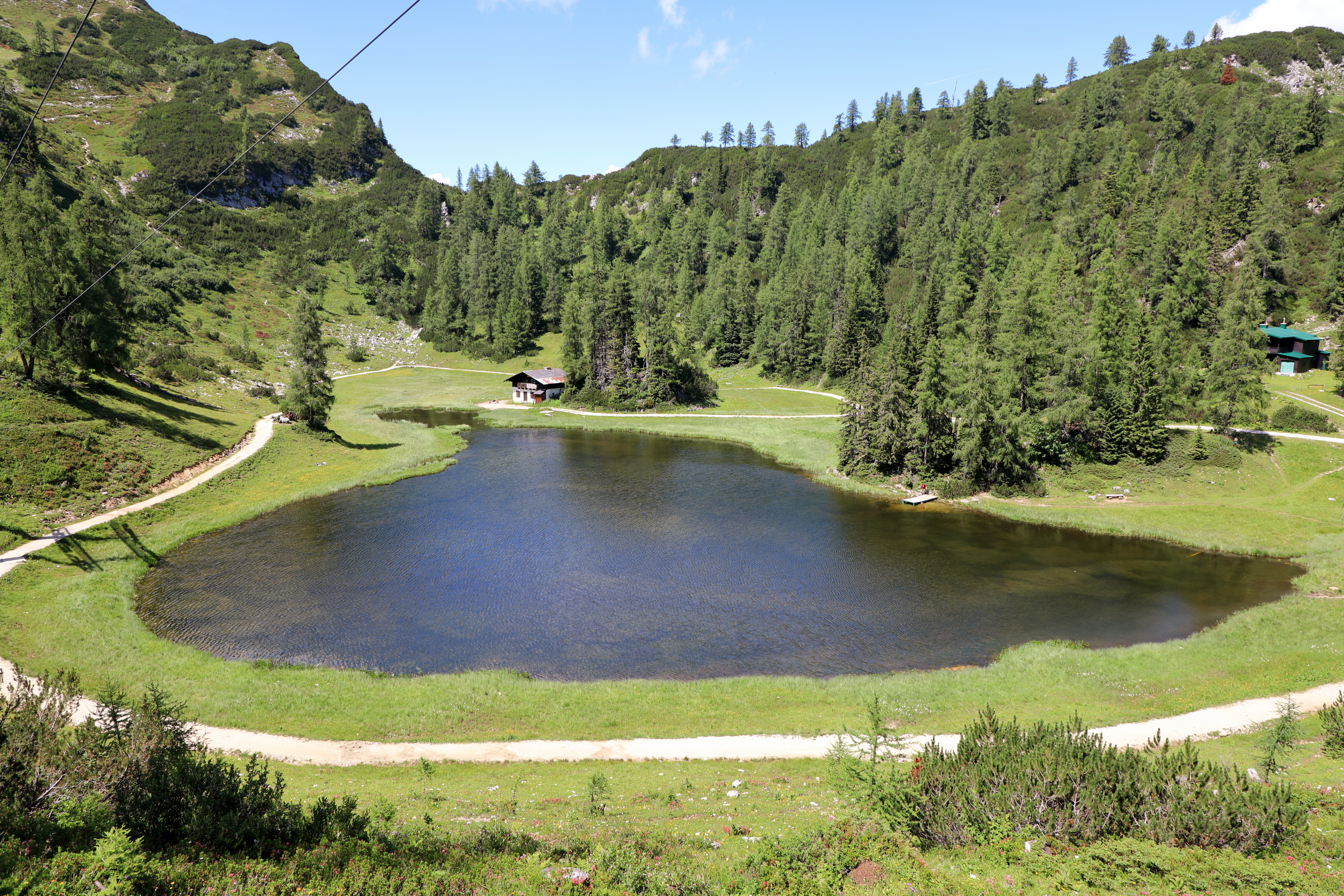
Krallersee

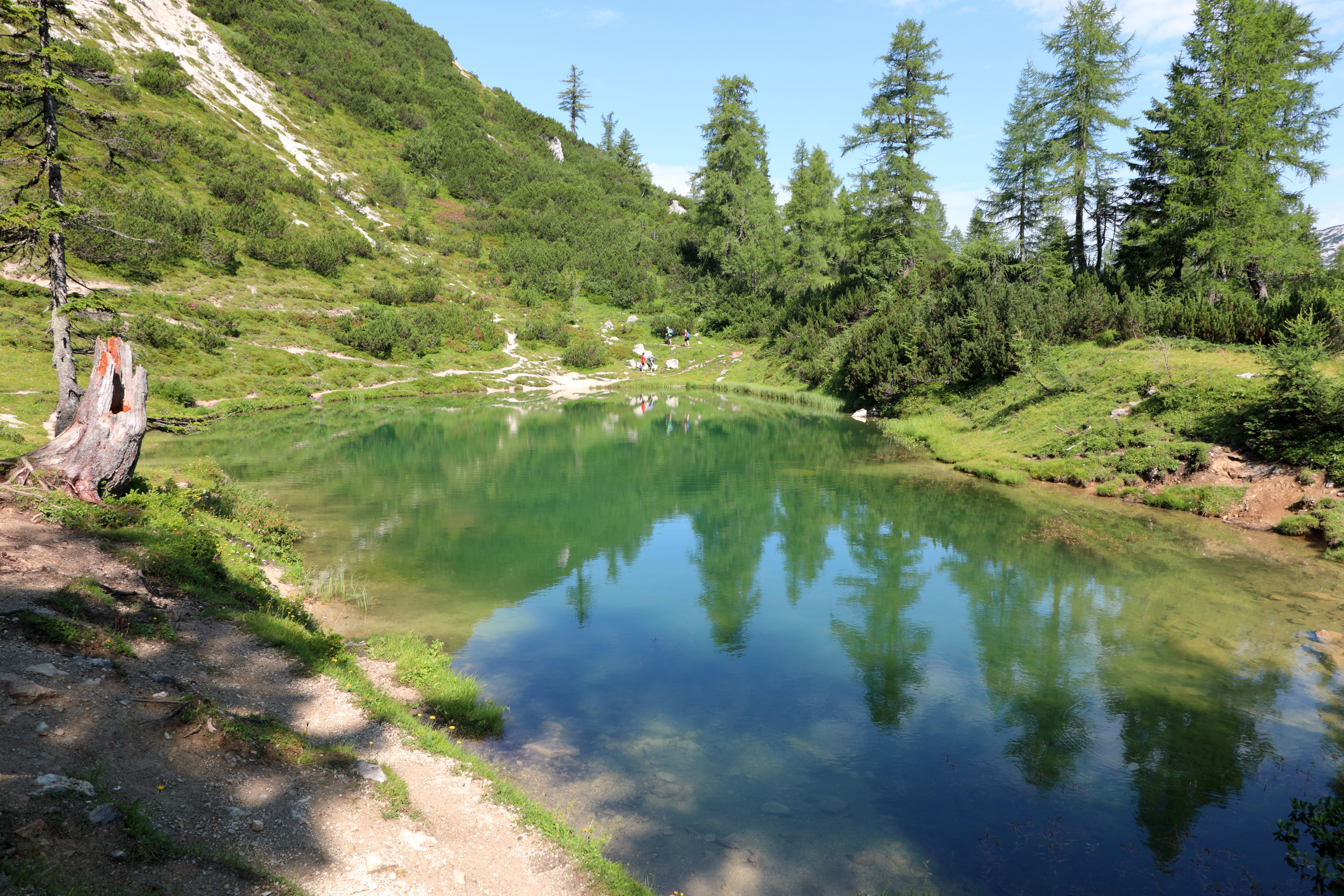
Märchensee

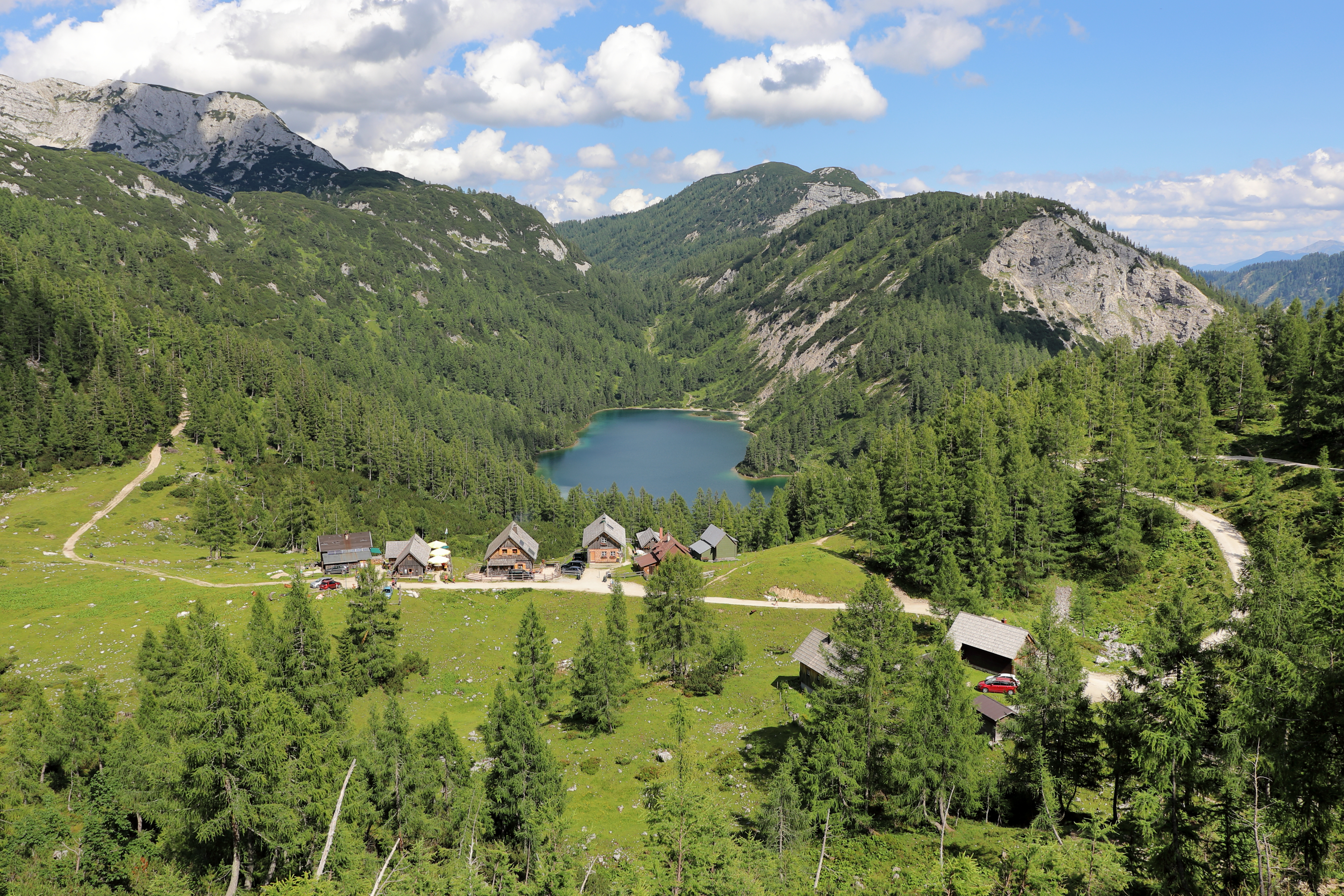
Steirersee
