= Geofrey Kusuro =

Ugandan long-distance runner

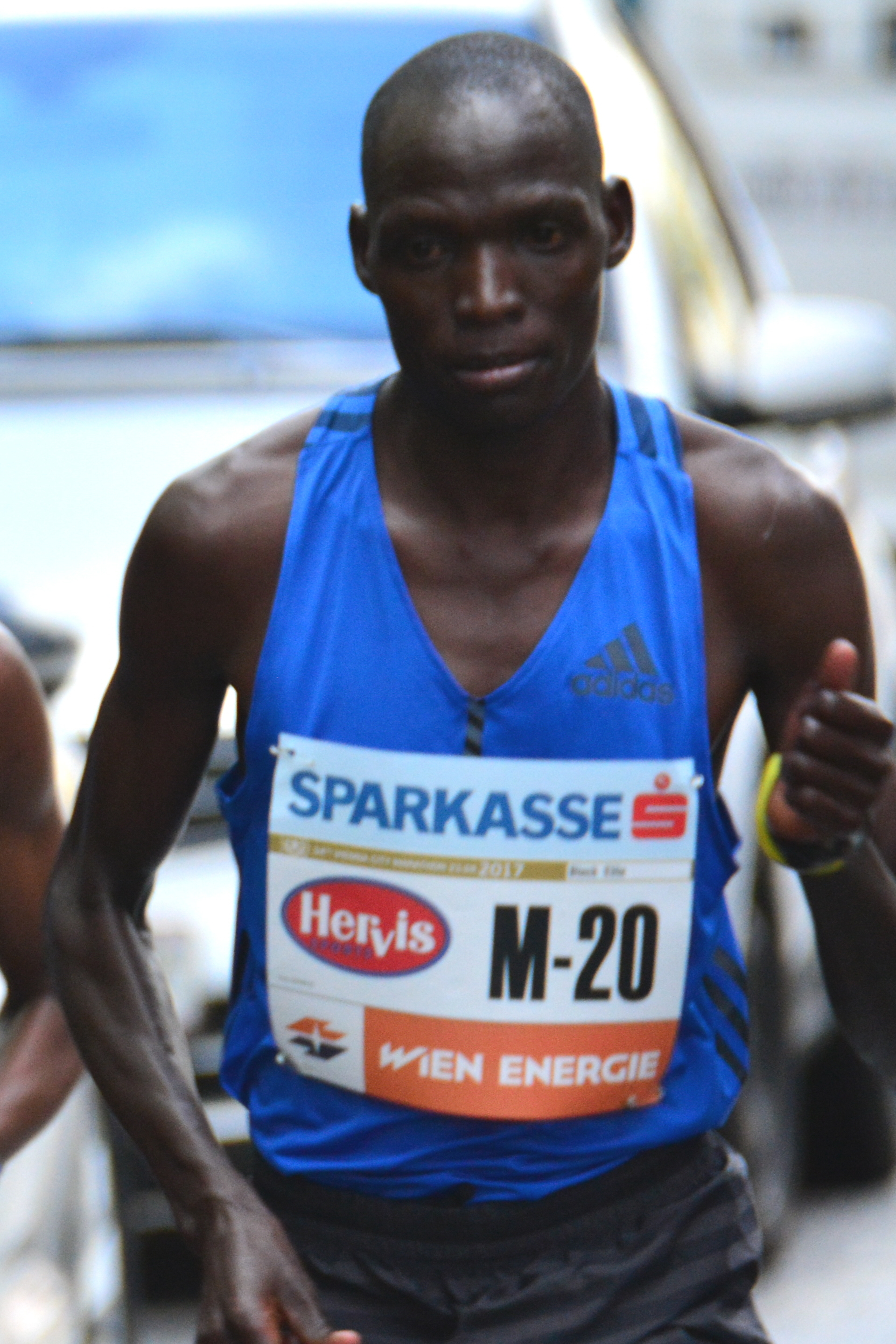

Personal information
- Full name: Geofrey Kusuro
- Nationality: Ugandan
- Born: 12 February 1989 (age 37)

Geofrey Kusuro (born 12 February 1989) is a Ugandan long-distance runner. He competed at the 2008 Summer Olympics in the men's 5000 m, not reaching the final. At the 2012 Summer Olympics, he competed in the Men's 5000 metres, finishing 37th overall in Round 1, failing to qualify for the final. He also represented Uganda at the 2009 and 2011 World Championships.

He was born in Mutishet.

He won the 2009 World Mountain Running Championships, thus becoming the first Ugandan to win the title.

In 2023, he won the Madrid Marathon with a time of 2:10:29.
