= Skyrunning World Championships =

High altitide mountain running competition

- Status: active
- Genre: sporting event
- Date: mid-year
- Frequency: biennial
- Location: various
- Inaugurated: 2010
- Most recent: 2024
- Organiser: ISF

The Skyrunning World Championships are skyrunning competitions held for the first time in 2010 and organised by the International Skyrunning Federation. The second edition was held in 2014 and thereafter the championships have taken place on a biennial basis.

== Editions ==
Edition	Year	Nation	Vertical Kilometer		SkyMarathon		Ultra SkyMarathon		details
1st	2010	Italy (Dolomites)	Canazei	16 July	Premana	25 July			
2nd	2014	France (Mont Blanc)	Chamonix	27 June	Chamonix	29 June	Chamonix	27 June	
3rd	2016	Spain (Vall de Boí)	Lleida	22 July	Lleida	22 July	Lleida	23 July	
4th	2018	United Kingdom (Scottish Highlands)	Kinlochleven	13 September	Kinlochleven	15 September	Kinlochleven	14 September	
5th	2021	Spain (Vall de Boí)	Lleida	9 July	Lleida	11 July	Lleida	10 July	
6th	2022	Italy (Domodossola)	San Domenico	9 September	Bognanco	11 September	Valdo	10 September	
7th	2024	Spain (Soria)	Ágreda	6 September	Covaleda	8 September	Covaleda	7 September	

== Medals ==
=== Men's Vertical Kilometer ===
Year	Gold	Silver	Bronze
2010	(Italy) Urban Zemmer	(Italy) Nicola Golinelli	(Italy) Manfred Reichegger
2014	(Spain) Kílian Jornet	(Italy) Bernard Dematteis	(Italy) Urban Zemmer
2016	(Norway) Stian Angermund-Vik	(Colombia) Saul Padua Rodriguez	(Italy) Hannes Perkmann
2018	(Switzerland) Rémi Bonnet	(Norway) Thorbjørn Ludvigsen	(Norway) Stian Angermund-Vik
2021	(Japan) Ruy Ueda	(Spain) Daniel Osanz	(Switzerland) Roberto Delorenzi
2022	(United States) Joseph DeMoor	(Italy) Marcello Ugazo	(Italy) Alex Oberbacher
2024	(Spain) Alain Santamaria	(United States) Joseph DeMoor	(Italy) Alex Oberbacher

=== Women's Vertical Kilometer ===
Year	Gold	Silver	Bronze
2010	(France) Laetitia Roux	(Italy) Antonella Confortola	(United Kingdom) Angela Mudge
2014	(Spain) Laura Orgué	(United States) Stevie Kremer	(France) Christel Dewalle
2016	(Spain) Laura Orgué	(Spain) Maite Maiora	(Spain) Paula Cabrerizo
2018	(Spain) Laura Orgué	(Sweden) Lina El Kott Helander	(United States) Hillary Gerardi
2021	(Czech Republic) Marcela Vašínová	(Spain) Oihana Kortazar	(France) Iris Pessey
2022	(Switzerland) Maude Mathys	(France) Christel Dewalle	(Switzerland) Allesandra Schmid
2024	(Spain) Naiara Irigoyen	(Switzerland) Paola Stampanoni	(Italy) Benedetta Broggi

=== Men's SkyMarathon ===
Year	Gold	Silver	Bronze
2010	(Spain) Kílian Jornet	(Italy) Marco De Gasperi	(Spain) Luis Alberto Hernando
2014	(Spain) Kílian Jornet	(France) Michel Lanne	(United Kingdom) Thomas Owens
2016	(Norway) Stian Angermund-Vik	(United Kingdom) Thomas Owens	(Spain) Ismail Razga
2018	(Spain) Kilian Jornet	(Italy) Nadir Maguet	(Norway) Stian Angermund-Vik
2021	(Spain) Manuel Merillas	(Switzerland) Christian Mathys	(Japan) Ruy Ueda
2022	(Switzerland) Roberto Delorenzi	(France) Frederic Tranchand	(Japan) Ruy Ueda
2024	(Spain) Alain Santamaria	(Italy) Lorenzo Beltrami	(Japan) Ruy Ueda

=== Women's SkyMarathon ===
Year	Gold	Silver	Bronze
2010	(France) Laetitia Roux	(Spain) Mireia Miro	(Italy) Emanuela Brizio
2014	(Italy) Elisa Desco	(United States) Megan Kimmel	(United States) Stevie Kremer
2016	(Spain) Maite Maiora	(Spain) Azara Garcia	(Italy) Elisa Desco
2018	(Sweden) Tove Alexandersson	(United Kingdom) Victoria Wilkinson	(United Kingdom) Holly Page
2021	(Czech Republic) Marcela Vašínová	(Spain) Oihana Kortazar	(Spain) Marta Molist
2022	(Romania) Denisa Dragomir	(Spain) Patricia Pineda	(Italy) Martina Cumerlato
2024	(Sweden) Louise Jernberg	(Sweden) Barbro Fjällstedt	(Mexico) Karina Karsolio

=== Men's Ultra SkyMarathon ===
Year	Gold	Silver	Bronze
2014	(Spain) Luis Alberto Hernando	(France) François D'Haene	(Australia) Ben Duffus
2016	(Spain) Luis Alberto Hernando	(United Kingdom) Andy Symonds	(Spain) Javier Dominguez
2018	(United Kingdom) Jonathan Albon	(Sweden) André Jonsson	(Spain) Luis Alberto Hernando
2021	(Andorra) Marc Casal Mir	(Spain) Manuel Anguita	(Spain) Borja Fernández
2022	(Italy) Cristian Minoggio	(Australia) Blake Turner	(Spain) Alejandro Mayor
2024	(Italy) Cristian Minoggio	(Spain) Jesus Gil Garcia	(Japan) Shoma Otagiri

=== Women's Ultra SkyMarathon ===
Year	Gold	Silver	Bronze
2014	(Sweden) Emelie Forsberg	(New Zealand) Anna Frost	(Poland) Magdalena Laczak
2016	(France) Caroline Chaverot	(Spain) Eva Moreda	(United Kingdom) Jasmin Paris
2018	(Netherlands) Ragna Debats	(Spain) Gemma Arenas	(Ecuador) Maria Mercedes Pila
2021	(Spain) Maite Maiora	(Spain) Gemma Arenas	(Italy) Giuditta Turini
2022	(Italy) Giuditta Turini	(Spain) Gemma Arenas	(Spain) Sandra Sevillano
2024	(Italy) Giulia Marchesoni	(Japan) Honoka Akiyama	(Spain) Gemma Arenas

== See also ==
- Skyrunner World Series
