= Golden Trail Series =

International running races

- Status: Active
- Genre: Trail racing
- Frequency: Annual
- Location: Various
- Country: Worldwide
- Years active: 2018–present
- Sponsor: Salomon Group
- Website: www.goldentrailseries.com

The Golden Trail Series is a points-based series of international trail races featuring a changing lineup of top races each year. The series was created to grow the sport of trail running by creating a series of high-profile, high-spectacle, high-paying races; and to showcase the speed and excitement of shorter-distance (sub-marathon) trail racing, as opposed to the relative slowness of ultramarathons.

== Overview ==
The series plays an important part in the racing schedules of many of the world's best trail runners. Notable male competitors include Stian Angermund, Francesco Puppi, Remi Bonnet, and Frédéric Tranchand, with Maude Mathys and Blandine L'Hirondel among the notable women. Salomon supports the Golden Trail Series.

Competitions and athlete interviews are covered on Golden Trail TV and web series include Chasing Dreams which are presented by running journalist David Hellard.

== Race Format ==
The series consists of eight main races around the globe each season. Runners accumulate points based on their finishing positions, with points awarded down to the 60th place finisher. Each athlete’s best three performances from the regular-season races count toward their series ranking. After all eight races, the top 30 male and female athletes in the standings qualify for the Grand Final.

The series concludes with a Grand Final that consists of a prologue time trial (with partial points reward) and a final race (with full points reward). Participation in the Grand Final is mandatory to be included in the final standings. Overall series winners are determined by the highest points total from their best three regular races plus the Grand Final.

== Races ==
Races are categorised into the Golden Trail World Series (GTWS), started in 2018, and the Golden Trail National Series (GTNS), started in 2019. The former includes several of the world's most competitive trail races.

The Golden Trail Championship (GTC) was created in 2020 to replace the planned World Series which was cancelled due to the COVID-19 pandemic. It took places in the Azores in the form of a four-day stage race. The success of the GTC format meant that it was proposed as a replacement for the series final in alternating years.

The specific races in the series are not always the same each year. While some iconic races appear often, new races are introduced and some rotated out annually. The location of the Grand Final also varies from year to year.

=== Past Golden Trail World Series Courses ===
- Kobe Trail (Kobe, Japan)
- Great Wall Trail Race (Chengde, China)
- Il Golfo Dell Isola (Noli, Italy)
- Broken Arrow Skyrace (Olympic Valley, California, USA)
- Tepec Trail (Huasca de Ocampo, Mexico)
- Pitzt Alpine Glacier Trail (Pitztal, Austria)
- Ledro Sky Trentino (Trentino, Italy)
- The Madeira Ocean Trails (Madeira, Portugal)
- Flagstaff Sky Peaks (Flagstaff, Arizona, USA)
- Stranda Fjord Trail Race (Stranda, Norway)
- Zegama-Aizkorri (Zegama, Spain)
- Pikes Peak Ascent (Pikes Peak, USA)
- Sierre-Zinal (Valais, Switzerland)
- Marathon du Mont Blanc (Mont Blanc, France)

==== Winners ====
World Series winners since 2018:

Year	Men	Women
2018	(Norway) Stian Angermund	(New Zealand) Ruth Croft
2019	(Spain) Kilian Jornet	(Switzerland) Judith Wyder
2020	(Poland) Bartłomiej Przedwojewski	(Switzerland) Maude Mathys
2021	(Norway) Stian Angermund	(Switzerland) Maude Mathys
2022	(Switzerland) Rémi Bonnet	(Netherlands) Nienke Brinkman
2023	(Switzerland) Rémi Bonnet	(United States) Sophia Laukli
2024	(Morocco) Elhousine Elazzaoui	(Kenya) Joyce Njeru
2025	(Morocco) Elhousine Elazzaoui	(Romania) Monica Mădălina Florea
2026	(Morocco) Elhousine Elazzaoui	(Romania) Monica Mădălina Florea

=== Golden Trail National Series ===
Races are predominantly held in Europe, although some races are also held in North America and Asia.

France

- Ergysport Trail du Ventoux
- Trail de Guerledan
- Mont Blanc Marathon
- Skyrhune

United States

- Broken Arrow Skyrace
- Pikes Peak Ascent
- Flagstaff Sky Peaks

Canada

- Quebec Mega Trail 50k
- Whistler Alpine Meadows

Italy

- Dolomiti Beer Trail
- Bettelmatt Sky Race
- DoloMyths Run Sky Race
- Transpelmo

Spain

- L'Olla de Núria
- Salomon Mitja Pirineu

Portugal

- Louzantrail

United Kingdom

- Trail Marathon Wales
- The Serpent Trail
- Scafell Pike Trail Marathon
- Ring of Steall

Mexico

- Desafío en las Nubes
- Trail de la Mixteca Oaxaqueña
- Pachoa Trail

Slovenia

- UTVV Slovenia
- Kočevsko Outdoor Festival

Croatia

- Risnjak Trail
- Učka Trail

Germany

- Chiemgau Trail Run
- Zugspitz Ultratrail: Garmisch-Partenkirchen Trail
- Rennsteig-Herbstlauf

Switzerland

- Zermatt Marathon
- Sierre-Zinal

Austria

- Pitz Alpine Glacier Trail
- Mayrhofen Ultraks

Czech Republic

- Salomon Ještěd Skyrace, at Ještěd
- Salomon Valašský hrb
- Salomon Jesenický maraton

Slovakia

- Salomon Dragon Trails

Poland

- Golden Mountains Trails
- Tatra SkyMarathon

Denmark

- Hammer Trail

Finland

- Bodom Trail

Sweden

- Fjällmaraton 27k

Japan

- Mount Yuzawa Outstanding
- Central Alps Skyline Japan
- The 4100D Mountain Trail in Nozawa Onsen
- Otari Trail Open in Tsugaike
- Hakura Classic International

== See also ==
- Skyrunner World Series
- Vertical Kilometer World Circuit
- UTMB World Series
