= Moreda =

Moreda may refer to:

== People ==
- Alicia Moreda, a Puerto Rican actress
- Eva Moreda, a Spanish female sky runner
- Tigist Moreda, an Ethiopian long-distance runner
- Juan Bazo de Moreda, a Spanish noble

== Places ==
- Moreda, Aller, one of 18 parishes in Aller, Spain
- Moreda de Álava, a town in Spain
