= Sierre-Zinal =

Swiss mountain running race

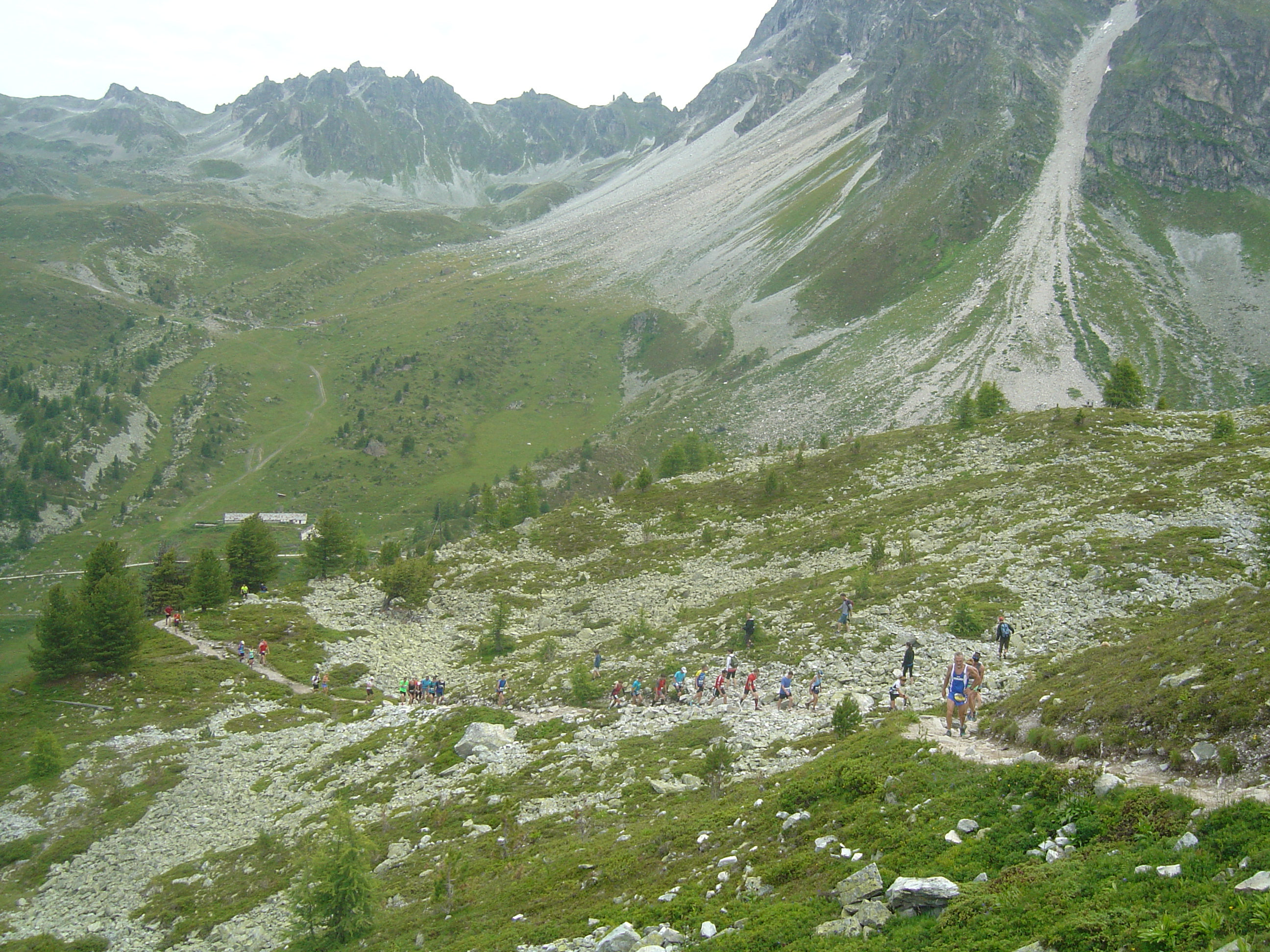
Sierre-Zinal 2014

The Sierre-Zinal race is an annual mountain running race that takes place in the Swiss canton of Valais each August. It is also known as the race of five 4000ers ("La course des cinq 4000"), as five peaks over four thousand meters are visible along its path: Weisshorn (4506 m), Zinalrothorn (4221 m), Obergabelhorn (4073 m), Matterhorn (4478 m), and Dent Blanche (4357 m).

== Results ==
=== Men ===
| Edition | Date | Distance | Winner | Time | Notes |
|---|---|---|---|---|---|
| 1st | 1974 | 31 km | (Switzerland) Eddy Hauser | 2:38:14 | |
| 2nd | 1975 | 31 km | (United Kingdom) Jeff Norman | 2:37:56 | |
| 3rd | 1976 | 31 km | (Italy) Aldo Allegranza | 2:46:33 | |
| 4th | 1977 | 31 km | (United States) Chuck Smead | 2:41:18 | |
| 5th | 1978 | 31 km | (Switzerland) Stefan Soler | 2:40:18 | |
| 6th | 1979 | 31 km | (United States) Pablo Vigil | 2:33:49 | |
| 7th | 1980 | 31 km | (United States) Pablo Vigil | 2:35:09 | |
| 8th | 1981 | 31 km | (United States) Pablo Vigil | 2:35:46 | |
| 9th | 1982 | 31 km | (United States) Pablo Vigil | 2:37:57 | |
| 10th | 1983 | 31 km | (Italy) Aldo Allegranza | 2:36:35 | |
| 11th | 1984 | 31 km | (Switzerland) Fabrizio Valentini | 2:37:49 | |
| 12th | 1985 | 31 km | (United Kingdom) Jack Maitland | 2:36:11 | |
| 13th | 1986 | 31 km | (United Kingdom) Phil Makepiece | 2:35:04 | |
| 14th | 1987 | 31 km | (Switzerland) Beat Imhof | 2:36:17 | |
| 15th | 1988 | 31 km | (Switzerland) Pierre-André Gobet | 2:34:16 | |
| 16th | 1989 | 31 km | (Switzerland) Pierre-André Gobet | 2:32:15 | |
| 17th | 1990 | 31 km | (Colombia) Jairo Correa | 2:34:05 | |
| 18th | 1991 | 31 km | (Colombia) Francisco Sánchez Martínez | 2:32:51 | |
| 19th | 1992 | 31 km | (Switzerland) Jean-François Cuennet | 2:37:57 | |
| 20th | 1993 | 31 km | (Colombia) Jairo Correa | 2:32:44 | |
| 21st | 1994 | 31 km | (Colombia) Jacinto Lopez | 2:35:25 | |
| 22nd | 1995 | 31 km | (Colombia) Jairo Correa | 2:34:21 | |
| 23rd | 1996 | 31 km | (Ethiopia) Eticha Tesfaye | 2:41:05 | |
| 24th | 1997 | 31 km | (Czech Republic) Martin Horacek | 2:39:53 | |
| 25th | 1998 | 31 km | (Mexico) Ricardo Mejia | 2:34:56 | |
| 26th | 1999 | 31 km | (Mexico) Ricardo Mejia | 2:32:38 | |
| 27th | 2000 | 31 km | (United Kingdom) Billy Burns | 2:35:45 | |
| 28th | 2001 | 31 km | (Mexico) Ricardo Mejia | 2:30:59 | |
| 29th | 2002 | 12 km | (New Zealand) Jonathan Wyatt | 1:07:17 | Shortened edition due to snow on the course |
| 30th | 2003 | 31 km | (New Zealand) Jonathan Wyatt | 2:29:12 | |
| 31st | 2004 | 31 km | (Mexico) Ricardo Mejia | 2:34:35 | |
| 32nd | 2005 | 31 km | (Mexico) Ricardo Mejia | 2:34:10 | |
| 33rd | 2006 | 31 km | (Switzerland) Tarcis Ançay | 2:36:09 | |
| 34th | 2007 | 31 km | (France) Jean-Christophe Dupont | 2:41:44 | |
| 35th | 2008 | 31 km | (Italy) Marco De Gasperi | 2:30:50 | |
| 36th | 2009 | 31 km | (Spain) Kilian Jornet | 2:35:30 | |
| 37th | 2010 | 31 km | (Spain) Kilian Jornet | 2:37:27 | |
| 38th | 2011 | 31 km | (Italy) Marco De Gasperi | 2:30:18 | |
| 39th | 2012 | 31 km | (Italy) Marco De Gasperi | 2:31:36 | |
| 40th | 2013 | 31 km | (Switzerland) Marc Lauenstein | 2:32:14 | |
| 41st | 2014 | 31 km | (Spain) Kilian Jornet | 2:31:54 | |
| 42nd | 2015 | 31 km | (Spain) Kilian Jornet | 2:33:14 | |
| 43rd | 2016 | 31 km | (Eritrea) Petro Mamu | 2:33:38 | |
| 44th | 2017 | 31 km | (Spain) Kilian Jornet | 2:33:05 | |
| 45th | 2018 | 31 km | (Spain) Kilian Jornet | 2:31:39 | |
| 46th | 2019 | 31 km | (Spain) Kilian Jornet | 2:25:35 | |
| 47th | 2020 | 31 km | (Spain) Kilian Jornet | 2:33:15 | Shorter Course due Covid Edition |
| 48th | 2021 | 31 km | (Spain) Kilian Jornet | 2:31:44 | |
| 49th | 2022 | 31 km | (Spain) Andreu Blanes Reig | 2:29:19 | |
| 50th | 2023 | 31 km | (Kenya) Philemon Ombogo Kiriago | 2:27:27 | |
| 51st | 2024 | 31 km | (Spain) Kilian Jornet | 2:25:34 | Course Record and 10th win (highest number of wins) |
| 52nd | 2025 | 31 km | (Kenya) Philemon Ombogo Kiriago | 2:28:45 | Kiriago's second win |
| 53th | 2026 | 31 km | (Kenya) Philemon Ombogo Kiriago | 2:26:24 | Kiriago's third win |

=== Women ===
| Edition | Date | Distance | Winner | Time | Notes |
|---|---|---|---|---|---|
| 1st | 1974 | 31 km | (France) Chantal Langlacé | 3:51:59 | |
| 2nd | 1975 | 31 km | (France) Annick Loir | 3:50:48 | |
| 3rd | 1976 | 31 km | (France) Annick Loir | 3:26:35 | |
| 4th | 1977 | 31 km | (Switzerland) Marijke Moser | 3:47:05 | |
| 5th | 1978 | 31 km | (Switzerland) Marijke Moser | 3:48:00 | |
| 6th | 1979 | 31 km | (France) Chantal Langlacé | 3:32:29 | |
| 7th | 1980 | 31 km | (Sweden) E. Ljungström | 3:22:53 | |
| 8th | 1981 | 31 km | (France) Marie Subot | 3:19:41 | |
| 9th | 1982 | 31 km | (France) Véronique Billat | 3:19:44 | |
| 10th | 1983 | 31 km | (France) Marie Subot | 3:29:44 | |
| 11th | 1984 | 31 km | (United Kingdom) Véronique Marot | 3:12:08 | |
| 12th | 1985 | 31 km | (United Kingdom) Véronique Marot | 3:06:55 | |
| 13th | 1986 | 31 km | (Switzerland) Annick Mérot | 3:28:05 | |
| 14th | 1987 | 31 km | (United Kingdom) Véronique Marot | 3:01:57 | |
| 15th | 1988 | 31 km | (United Kingdom) Sally Goldsmith | 3:04:37 | |
| 16th | 1989 | 31 km | (United Kingdom) Sally Goldsmith | 3:11:00 | |
| 17th | 1990 | 31 km | (Switzerland) Marie-Christine Ducret | 3:12:49 | |
| 18th | 1991 | 31 km | (Switzerland) Marie-Christine Ducret | 3:10:59 | |
| 19th | 1992 | 31 km | (France) Odile Léveque | 3:22:55 | |
| 20th | 1993 | 31 km | (France) Beverley Redfern | 3:11:31 | |
| 21st | 1994 | 31 km | (France) Brigitte Eustache | 3:24:29 | |
| 22nd | 1995 | 31 km | (Switzerland) Isabella Crettenand-Moretti | 3:09:44 | |
| 23rd | 1996 | 31 km | (Switzerland) Isabella Crettenand-Moretti | 3:05:23 | |
| 24th | 1997 | 31 km | (Switzerland) Isabella Crettenand-Moretti | 3:04:20 | |
| 25th | 1998 | 31 km | (Russia) Svetlana Netchaeva | 3:10:31 | |
| 26th | 1999 | 31 km | (Russia) Vera Sukhova | 3:10:57 | |
| 27th | 2000 | 31 km | (Russia) Irina Poupaza | 3:05:12 | |
| 28th | 2001 | 31 km | (United Kingdom) Angela Mudge | 2:56:41 | |
| 29th | 2002 | 12 km | (Germany) Gudrun de Pay | 1:29:20 | Shortened edition due to snow on the course |
| 30th | 2003 | 31 km | (Ethiopia) Tsige Worku | 3:16:07 | |
| 31st | 2004 | 31 km | (Switzerland) Angéline Joly | 3:09:22 | |
| 32nd | 2005 | 31 km | (Switzerland) Angéline Joly | 2:55:35 | |
| 33rd | 2006 | 31 km | (Czech Republic) Anna Pichrtova | 2:58:42 | |
| 34th | 2007 | 31 km | (Czech Republic) Anna Pichrtova | 2:55:19 | |
| 35th | 2008 | 31 km | (Czech Republic) Anna Pichrtova | 2:54:26 | |
| 36th | 2009 | 31 km | (Czech Republic) Anna Pichrtova | 2:58:24 | 4th win (highest number of wins) |
| 37th | 2010 | 31 km | (United States) Megan Lund | 3:09:28 | |
| 38th | 2011 | 31 km | (Spain) Oiha Kortazar Aranzeta | 3:11:25 | |
| 39th | 2012 | 31 km | (France) Aline Camboulives | 3:02:58 | |
| 40th | 2013 | 31 km | (Italy) Elisa Desco | 2:58:33 | |
| 41st | 2014 | 31 km | (United States) Stevie Kremer | 3:03:12 | |
| 42nd | 2015 | 31 km | (Kenya) Lucy Wambui Murigi | 2:56:40 | |
| 43rd | 2016 | 31 km | (Germany) Michelle Maier | 2:58:40 | |
| 44th | 2017 | 31 km | (Kenya) Lucy Wambui Murigi | 2:58:39 | |
| 45th | 2018 | 31 km | (Kenya) Lucy Wambui Murigi | 2:57:54 | |
| 46th | 2019 | 31 km | (Switzerland) Maude Mathys | 2:49:20 | Course record |
| 47th | 2020 | 31 km | (Switzerland) Maude Mathys | 2:48:48 | Shorter Course due Covid Edition |
| 48th | 2021 | 31 km | (Switzerland) Maude Mathys | 2:46:03 | Shorter Course due Covid Edition |
| 49th | 2022 | 31 km | (Switzerland) Maude Mathys | 2:52:32 | 4th win (highest number of wins) |
| 50th | 2023 | 31 km | (United States) Sophia Laukli | 2:53:17 | |
| 51st | 2024 | 31km | (Kenya) Joyline Chepngeno | 2:54:06 | |
| 52nd | 2025 | 31km | (Kenya) Caroline Kimutai | 2:55:31 | Joyline Chepngeno crossed the line first but was later disqualified. |
| 53th | 2026 | 31km | (Romania) Monica Mădălina Florea | 2:55:46 | |
