= 2022 Skyrunning World Championships =

- Location: Ossola, Italy
- Dates: 9–11 September 2022

The 2022 Skyrunning World Championships was 7th edition Skyrunning World Championships and took place in Ossola, Italy from 9–11 September 2022. The main town of the area, where the teams will be based, was Domodossola.

== Program ==
Date	Disciplines
9 September	Rampigada Vertical (3.8 km long with 1063m vertical climb)
10 September	Bettelmatt SkyUltra (57.8 km long with 3508m vertical climb)
11 September	La Veia SkyRace (31 km long with 2600m vertical climb)

== Medalists ==
Event	Gold		Silver		Bronze	
Men
Vertical	Joseph DeMoor (USA)	37’07″83	Marcello Ugazio (ITA)	37’12″25	Alex Oberbacher (ITA)	37’24″84
SkyUltra	Cristian Minoggio (ITA)	5h28’25”	Blake Turner (AUS)	6h04’46”	Alejandro Mayor (ESP)	6h05’23”
Sky	Roberto Delorenzi (SUI)	2h51’13”	Frédéric Tranchand (FRA)	2h52’09”	Ruy Ueda (JPN)	2h53’12”
Combined (Vertical + Sky)	Roberto Delorenzi (SUI)		Ruy Ueda (JPN)		Joseph DeMoor (USA)	
Women
Vertical	Maude Mathys (SUI)	40’50″49	Christel Dewalle (FRA)	40’50″84	Alessandra Schmid (SUI)	44’01″44
SkyUltra	Giuditta Turini (ITA)	6h49’59”	Gemma Arenas (ESP)	7h04’56”	Sandra Sevillano (ESP)	7h05’25”
Sky	Denisa Dragomir (ROU)	3h29’51”	Patricia Pineda (ESP)	3h33’47”	Martina Cumerlato (ITA)	3h35’58”
Combined (Vertical + Sky)	Barbora Macurová (CZE)		Lina El Kott Helander (SWE)		Chiara Giovando (ITA)	
Mixed
Country Ranking	Italy		Spain		Japan	

== Medal table ==
* Host nation (Italy)

Rank	Nation	Gold	Silver	Bronze	Total
1	Italy (ITA)*	3	1	3	7
2	Switzerland (SUI)	3	0	1	4
3	United States (USA)	1	0	1	2
4	Czech Republic (CZE)	1	0	0	1
4	Romania (ROU)	1	0	0	1
6	Spain (ESP)	0	3	2	5
7	France (FRA)	0	2	0	2
8	Japan (JPN)	0	1	2	3
9	Australia (AUS)	0	1	0	1
9	Sweden (SWE)	0	1	0	1
Totals (10 entries)		9	9	9	27

== Participating nations ==
A record 35 countries participated in the 2022 Skyrunning World Championships. Nine countries participated for the first time: Belgium, Germany, Ireland, Israel, Kosovo, Montenegro, Romania, Slovenia and South Africa.

- Andorra
- Australia
- Austria
- Belgium
- Bolivia
- Brazil
- Bulgaria
- Costa Rica
- Cyprus
- Czech Republic
- France
- Germany
- Hungary
- Ireland
- Israel
- Italy
- Japan
- Kosovo
- Lithuania
- Montenegro
- Netherlands
- North Macedonia
- Norway
- Peru
- Portugal
- Romania
- Serbia
- Slovenia
- South Africa
- South Korea
- Spain
- Sweden
- Switzerland
- United Kingdom
- United States
