= 2010 Skyrunning World Championships =

- Host city: Canazei; Premana
- Country: Italy
- Events: Vertical Kilometer; SkyMarathon
- Opening: July 16, 2010
- Closing: July 25, 2010
- Website: skyrunning.com

The 2010 Skyrunning World Championships was the 1st edition of the global skyrunning competition, Skyrunning World Championships, organised by the International Skyrunning Federation and was held in Italian Dolomiti from 16 to 25 July 2010.

== Results ==
=== Men ===
==== Vertical Kilometer ====
The race took place in Canazei on 16 July 2010.

Rank	Athlete	Time
1st place, gold medalist(s)	(Italy) Urban Zemmer	0:33:16
2nd place, silver medalist(s)	(Italy) Nicola Golinelli	0:34:29
3rd place, bronze medalist(s)	(Italy) Manfred Reichegger	0:34:42
4	(Spain) Agustí Roc	0:34:50
5	(New Zealand) Jonathan Wyatt	0:34:53
6	(Italy) Dennis Brunod	0:35:17
7	(Spain) Luis Alberto Hernando	0:35:57
8	(Italy) Paolo Larger	0:36:07
9	(Italy) Ivo Zulian	0:36:21
10	(Slovenia) Nejc Kuhar	0:36:25
11	(Slovenia) Simon Alic	0:36:31
12	(Italy) Alessandro Follador	0:36:34
13	(Austria) Richard Obendorfer	0:37:38
14	(Slovenia) Matjaz Miklosa	0:37:55
15	(Spain) Raul Garcia	0:38:54
16	(Italy) Dario Steinacher	0:39:00
17	(Spain) Jessed Hernandez	0:39:11
18	(Slovenia) Kelmen Triler	0:39:25
19	(France) Pierre Chavuet	0:39:43
20	(Italy) Henry Hofer	0:39:44
21	(Italy) Daniel Ploner	0:40:13
22	(Andorra) Xavier Teixido	0:40:34
23	(Andorra) Oscar Casal	0:40:39
24	(Italy) Guido Pinamonti	0:40:53
25	(Andorra) Ferran Teixido	0:41:01
26	(Italy) Andrea Basolo	0:41:04
27	(Italy) Peter Steinhauser	0:41:39
28	(Spain) David Lopez	0:41:54
29	(Italy) Giuliano Gherardi	0:41:59
30	(Italy) Titta Scalet	0:42:05
31	(Italy) Walter Longhino	0:42:07
32	(Italy) Pierangelo Giacomuzzi	0:42:35
33	(Italy) Marco Facchinelli	0:42:42
34	(Italy) Giacomo Sangalli	0:42:44
35	(United Kingdom) Prasad Prasad	0:42:49
36	(Italy) Camillo Campestrini	0:43:02
37	(Andorra) Luis Sanvincente	0:43:09
38	(France) Thierry Galindo	0:43:12
39	(Italy) Eligio Bosin	0:43:25
40	(Italy) Francesco Tanara	0:43:30
41	(Italy) Aron Lazzaro	0:43:30
42	(Italy) Andrea Moretton	0:43:48
43	(Spain) Arnau Julia' Bonmati	0:43:57
44	(Italy) Andrea Aromatisi	0:44:01
45	(Russia) Alexey Troshchenko	0:44:03
46	(Italy) Giuseppe Zanon	0:44:09
47	(Italy) Nicolo' Dellagiacoma	0:44:34
48	(Italy) Luca Ramella	0:44:54
49	(Italy) Gianmarco Bazzoni	0:44:57
50	(Andorra) Marc Casal	0:45:02
51	(United Kingdom) Paul Faulkner	0:45:04
52	(Austria) Wolfgang Zingl	0:45:33
53	(Italy) Luca Ciola	0:45:43
54	(Greece) Dimitrios Theodorakakos	0:45:52
55	(Italy) Matteo Zanlucchi	0:46:16
56	(Italy) Riccardo Riolfatti	0:46:20
57	(Italy) Yuri Quaglierini	0:46:28
58	(Italy) Mario Hofer	0:46:32
59	(Italy) Stefanomarcello Burlon	0:46:40
60	(United Kingdom) Nathan Beard	0:46:46
61	(Italy) Luigi Sommavilla	0:46:56
62	(Italy) Ruggero Lorenzi	0:47:16
63	(Italy) Federico Bettega	0:47:17
64	(Italy) Franco Carlot	0:47:23
65	(Italy) Ivano Fontana	0:47:25
66	(Italy) Mattia Giongo	0:47:32
67	(Italy) Giorgio Ficetto	0:47:36
68	(France) Christophe Doulat	0:47:40
69	(Italy) Fausto Nobili	0:47:47
70	(United Kingdom) Adam Ward	0:47:57
71	(Italy) Roberto Michelon	0:48:04
72	(Bulgaria) Rosen Lilov	0:48:11
73	(Italy) Giorgio Rostan	0:48:12
74	(Italy) Vincenzo Varesco	0:48:43
75	(Italy) Eugenio Florean	0:48:46
76	(Italy) Davide Becchetti	0:48:50
77	(Italy) Ivano Verra	0:49:12
78	(Italy) Fausto Riz	0:49:33
79	(Italy) Silvano Frattino	0:49:47
80	(Italy) Enrico Conterno	0:50:00
81	(Italy) Gabriele Costerman	0:50:01
82	(Italy) Giuseppe Franceschi	0:50:32
83	(Italy) Serafino Bonata	0:50:35
84	(Italy) Luca Giovanelli	0:50:53
85	(Italy) Riccardo Ramella	0:50:57
86	(Italy) Marco Collavo	0:51:16
87	(Italy) Alexander Keim	0:51:21
88	(Italy) Diego Gugole	0:51:28
89	(Italy) Stefano Larcher	0:51:38
90	(Italy) Onorino Scalet	0:51:53
91	(Italy) Luigi Cian	0:51:59
92	(Italy) Fabio Valmassoi	0:52:16
93	(Italy) Alessandro Lucchini	0:52:18
94	(Italy) Gianni Menusan	0:52:30
95	(Italy) Carlo Sottsass	0:52:34
96	(Italy) Carlalberto Cimenti	0:52:41
97	(Italy) Umberto Rossoni	0:52:44
98	(Russia) Valentin Vergilush	0:53:20
99	(Italy) Rudi Giordano	0:53:29
100	(Italy) Daniele Cesconetto	0:53:32
101	(Italy) Roberto Tanotti	0:53:39
102	(Italy) Moreno Visona'	0:53:43
103	(Italy) Massimo Nisardi	0:54:34
104	(Italy) Riccardo Debertolis	0:54:49
105	(Italy) David Bianchini	0:54:59
106	(Italy) Paolo Profili	0:55:07
107	(Italy) Giancarlo Lira	0:55:16
108	(Denmark) Ansen Morten Thirup	0:55:39
109	(Denmark) Thomas Asmussen	0:55:39
110	(Italy) Olivo Micheluzzi	0:55:52
111	(Italy) Antonio Marchioni	0:55:57
112	(Italy) Riccardo Padesi	0:56:26
113	(Italy) Michele Gatto	0:56:29
114	(Italy) Andrea Lunelli	0:56:33
115	(Italy) Cristian Boninsegna	0:56:34
116	(Italy) Stephan Unterthurner	0:56:36
117	(Austria) Thomas Scheiring	0:56:43
118	(Italy) Maurizio Granzotto	0:56:55
119	(Italy) Pierluigi Peressutti	0:56:57
120	(Spain) Xavier Vall-Llaura	0:57:00
121	(Italy) Martino Avellis	0:57:17
122	(Italy) Enrico Cozzini	0:57:31
123	(Italy) Stefano Tron	0:57:39
124	(Italy) Claudio Michelon	0:57:50
125	(Italy) Leonardo Guerrini	0:58:08
126	(Italy) Luigi Lucchetta	0:58:18
127	(Bulgaria) Ivan Kutuev	0:58:21
128	(Italy) Simone Arrigoni	0:58:36
129	(Italy) Oliver Samain	0:58:42
130	(Italy) Christian Giordano	0:59:46
131	(Italy) Tullio Deluca	0:59:59
132	(Italy) Alessio Alfier	1:01:03
133	(Italy) Marco Gandini	1:01:45
134	(Italy) Giovanni Barutti	1:02:37
135	(Italy) Duccio Tessadri	1:03:05
136	(Italy) Alessandro Giacchero	1:03:26
137	(Italy) Claudio Marri	1:03:30
138	(Italy) Ampelio Michelon	1:03:39
139	(Italy) Valter Baladelli	1:08:58
140	(Italy) Michele Mucin	1:09:38
141	(Italy) Matteo Orlandi	1:13:43
142	(Italy) Elio Sassara	1:14:22
143	(Italy) Teodosio La Rocca	1:23:22

==== SkyMarathon ====
The race took place in Premana on 25 July 2010.

Rank	Athlete	Time
1st place, gold medalist(s)	(Spain) Kilian Jornet	3:01:14
2nd place, silver medalist(s)	(Italy) Marco De Gasperi	3:04:34
3rd place, bronze medalist(s)	(Spain) Luis Alberto Hernando	3:11:00
4	(Spain) Tofol Castanier	3:11:49
5	(Italy) Nicola Golinelli	3:12:50
6	(United Kingdom) Tom Owens	3:13:02
7	(Mexico) Ricardo Mejia	3:13:54
8	(Italy) Tadei Pivk	3:14:24
9	(Italy) Dennis Brunod	3:15:39
10	(Spain) Agusti Roc	3:18:24
11	(Italy) Paolo Larger	3:19:37
12	(Italy) Maurizio Fenaroli	3:20:02
13	(Mexico) Victor Cortes	3:20:16
14	(Spain) David Lopez	3:22:37
15	(Italy) Stefano Butti	3:23:06
16	(United Kingdom) Andy Symonds	3:23:19
17	(Italy) Fulvio Dapit	3:23:25
18	(Italy) Paolo Gotti	3:23:43
19	(Italy) Gil Pintarelli	3:25:37
20	(Spain) Jessed Hernandez	3:30:51
21	(Italy) Filippo Beccari	3:34:55
22	(Italy) Riccardo Faverio	3:35:43
23	(Italy) Massimo Colombo	3:38:15
24	(Italy) Fausto Rizzi	3:39:01
25	(Italy) Marco Rusconi	3:41:32

=== Women ===
==== Vertical Kilometer ====
The race took place in Canazei on 16 July 2010.

Rank	Athlete	Time
1st place, gold medalist(s)	(France) Laetitia Roux	0:40:16
2nd place, silver medalist(s)	(Italy) Antonella Confortola	0:41:16
3rd place, bronze medalist(s)	(United Kingdom) Angela Mudge	0:42:47
4	(New Zealand) Anna Frost	0:43:39
5	(Spain) Mireia Miro	0:44:47
6	(Russia) Zhanna Vokueva	0:45:15
7	(United Kingdom) Fiona Maxwell	0:45:59
8	(Italy) Raffaella Miravalle	0:47:30
9	(Spain) Monica Ardid	0:48:22
10	(Spain) Laia Andreu	0:50:08
11	(Spain) Nuria Dominguez	0:50:47
12	(Italy) Alessandra Valgoi	0:50:55
13	(Spain) Blanca Serrano	0:50:56
14	(Italy) Laura Gaddo	0:53:34
15	(Spain) Silvia Leal	0:54:13
16	(Italy) Silvana Iori	0:55:03
17	(Italy) Daniela Scaccabarozzi	0:56:26
18	(Italy) Elena Turchetto	0:56:45
19	(Italy) Elena Cerutti	0:56:56
20	(Italy) Raffaella Cian	0:57:06
21	(Italy) Sabrina Polito	0:57:08
22	(Italy) Anna Zambanini	0:57:31
23	(Italy) Mariagiulia Canello	0:58:14
24	(Italy) Maria Rosa Pighetti	1:02:51
25	(Italy) Sonia Stramare	1:04:47
26	(Italy) Morena Pedroni	1:05:50
27	(Slovenia) Jasmina Klanicnik	1:09:28

==== SkyMarathon ====
The race took place in Premana on 25 July 2010.

Rank	Athlete	Time
1st place, gold medalist(s)	(France) Laetitia Roux	3:46:40
2nd place, silver medalist(s)	(Spain) Mireia Miro	3:53:52
3rd place, bronze medalist(s)	(Italy) Emanuela Brizio	3:58:19
4	(France) Stephanie Jimenez	3:59:12
5	(Italy) Paola Romanin	4:03:41
6	(Spain) Monica Ardid	4:11:13
7	(France) Corinne Favre	4:12:14
8	(Spain) Laia Andreu	4:14:00
9	(Italy) Carolina Tiraboschi	4:18:29
10	(Spain) Nuria Dominguez	4:19:55
11	(Spain) Blanca Maria Serrano	4:22:35
12	(Italy) Stephanie Frigiere	4:29:41
13	(Italy) Cinzia Bertasa	4:30:00
14	(Italy) Francesca Canepa	4:52:49
15	(Italy) Francesca Domini	4:53:17
16	(Italy) Giuliana Arrigoni	4:54:17
17	(Italy) Alessandra Bastesin	5:04:10
18	(Italy) Lara Mustat	5:05:11
19	(Spain) Encarni Martinez	5:07:21
20	(Italy) Serena Piganzoli	5:09:17
21	(Italy) Simonetta Castelli	5:14:52
22	(Italy) Roberta Garbin	5:25:54
23	(Italy) Silvia Chiappa	5:29:54
24	(Italy) Brunella Parolini	5:36:27
25	(Italy) Paola Pirovano	5:37:59
26	(Spain) Naila Jornet	5:42:32
27	(Italy) Maria Cortina	6:19:07
