= Angermünde (disambiguation) =

Angermünde is a town in Brandenburg, Germany.

Angermünde or Angermund may also refer to:

- Angermund, an urban borough of Düsseldorf, Germany
- Stian Angermund (born 1986), Norwegian male sky runner
- Angermünde, a town in the Duchy of Courland, now Angerciems, Latvia
