= Pierre Chauvet =

Pierre Chauvet may refer to:

- Pierre Chauvet (cross-country skier), French two-time Kilomètre vertical de Fully winner
- Fritz Glatz (1943–2002), Austrian racing driver; also raced under the pseudonym Pierre Chauvet
