= Brad Pollitt =

American politician

Member of the Missouri House of Representatives from the 52nd district
- Incumbent
- Assumed office 2019
- Preceded by: Nathan Beard
- Succeeded by: Israel Baeza (elect)

Personal details
- Party: Republican
- Spouse: Danette
- Children: 3
- Education: Northeast Missouri State University; William Woods University

Bradley Pollitt is an American politician. He is a Republican representing the 52nd district in the Missouri House of Representatives.

== Political career ==
In 2018, former District 52 representative Nathan Beard announced that he would not seek reelection. Pollitt ran for the open seat and defeated Democrat Dan Marshall to win. He is running for reelection in 2020.

As of June 2020, Pollitt sits on the following committees:

- Agriculture Policy
- Health and Mental Health Policy
- Special Committee on Student Accountability

== Electoral history ==
- Brad Pollitt has not yet had any opponents in Republican primary elections, thus getting nominated each time by default.

2018 general election: Missouri House of Representatives, District 52
Party	Candidate	Votes	%
Republican	Brad Pollitt	7,997	71.41%
Democratic	Dan Marshall	3,201	28.59%
Total votes		11,198	100.00%

Missouri House of Representatives Election, November 3, 2020, District 52
Party	Candidate	Votes	%	±%
Republican	Brad Pollitt	12,626	100.00%	+28.59
Total votes		12,626	100.00%	

Missouri House of Representatives Election, November 8, 2022, District 52
Party	Candidate	Votes	%	±%
Republican	Brad Pollitt	7,831	75.13%	−24.87
Democratic	Rene Vance	2,592	24.87%	+24.87
Total votes		10,423	100.00%	

== Personal life ==
Pollitt holds a bachelor's degree from Northeast Missouri State University and a master's degree from William Woods University, as well as an educational specialist certificate from the University of Central Missouri. He and his wife, Danette, have three children and live in Sedalia, Missouri.
