= 2016 Skyrunning World Championships =

Skyrunning competition

- Host city: Lleida
- Country: Spain
- Events: Vertical Kilometer; SkyMarathon; Ultra SkyMarathon
- Opening: July 22, 2016
- Closing: July 23, 2016
- Website: skyrunning.com

The 2016 Skyrunning World Championships was the 3rd edition of the global skyrunning competition, Skyrunning World Championships, organised by the International Skyrunning Federation and was held in Spain (Lleida, Vall de Boí) from 22 to 23 July 2016.

== Results ==
=== Ultra SkyMarathon (105 km) ===
==== Men ====
Rank	Athlete	Country	Time
1st place, gold medalist(s)	Luis Alberto Hernando	Spain	12:53:42
2nd place, silver medalist(s)	Andy Symonds	United Kingdom	13:25:41
3rd place, bronze medalist(s)	Javier Dominguez Ledo	Spain	13:38:04
4	Manuel Anguita Bayo	Spain	13:45:04
5	Zdenek Kriz	Czech Republic	14:00:00
6	Yeray Duran Lopez	Spain	14:15:06
7	Sebas Sanchez Saez	Spain	14:19:10
8	Luis Fernandes	Portugal	14:26:46
9	Kim Collison	United Kingdom	
10	Sam McCutcheon	New Zealand	

==== Women ====
Rank	Athlete	Country	Time
1st place, gold medalist(s)	Caroline Chaverot	France	13:13
2nd place, silver medalist(s)	Eva Maria Moreda Gabaldon	Spain	14:15
3rd place, bronze medalist(s)	Jasmin Paris	United Kingdom	14:22
4	Maud Gobert	France	14:50
5	Fernanda Maciel	Brazil	15:16
6	Kristina Pattison	United States	15:38
7	Hillary Allen	United States	15:40
8	Yukari Fukuda	Japan	15:54
9	Gema Arenas Alcazar	Spain	16:12
10	Zuzana Urbancova	Czech Republic	16:32

=== SkyMarathon (42 km) ===
==== Men ====
Rank	Athlete	Country	Time
1st place, gold medalist(s)	Stian Angermund-Vik	Norway	3:56:47
2nd place, silver medalist(s)	Tom Owens	United Kingdom	4:01:59
3rd place, bronze medalist(s)	Ismail Razga	Spain	4:05:56

==== Women ====
Rank	Athlete	Country	Time
1st place, gold medalist(s)	Maite Maiora Elizondo	Spain	4:42:15
2nd place, silver medalist(s)	Azara Garcia	Spain	4:44:04
3rd place, bronze medalist(s)	Elisa Desco	Italy	4:46:43
4	Ida Nilsson	Sweden	4:53:52

=== Vertical Kilometer ===
==== Men ====
Rank	Athlete	Country	Time
1st place, gold medalist(s)	Stian Angermund-Vik	Norway	34:16
2nd place, silver medalist(s)	Saul Antonio Padua Rodriguez	Colombia	34:42
3rd place, bronze medalist(s)	Hannes Perkmann	Italy	34:44

==== Women ====
Rank	Athlete	Country	Time
DQ	~~Christel Dewalle~~	~~France~~	~~39:35~~
1st place, gold medalist(s)	Laura Orgue	Spain	40:39
2nd place, silver medalist(s)	Maite Maiora Elizondo	Spain	41:59
3rd place, bronze medalist(s)	Paula Cabrerizo	Spain	
