= Tromsø SkyRace =

Norwegian skyrunning competition

- Date: August
- Location: (Norway) Tromsø
- Event type: SkyRace
- Distance: 57 km / 4,800 m D+
- Established: 2014
- Website: Tromsø SkyRace

The Tromsø SkyRace was an international skyrunning competition held from 2014 until 2023. It ran every year in Tromsø (Norway) in August and consisted of four races both valid for the Skyrunner World Series.

== Races ==
- Hamperokken Skyrace, a SkyMarathon across and up the Hamperokken ridge (57 km / 4800 m elevation)
  - an official race of the Skyrunner World Series
- Tromsdalstind SkyRace, a SkyRace to the summit of Tromsdalstinden (28 km / 2000 m elevation)
- Blåmann Vertical, a Vertical Kilometer to the summit of Store Blåmann (2.7 km / 1044 m elevation)
  - an official race of the Skyrunner World Series in 2014, 2015
  - an official race of the Vertical Kilometer World Circuit since 2016
- Bønntuva tour-race, a mini SkyRace to the summit of Bønntuva and back (15 km / 800 m elevation)

== Hamperokken Skyrace ==
Race of Skyrunner World Series

Year	Men's winner	Time	Women's winner	Time
2014 (45 km)	(Norway) Eirik Dagssøn Haugsnes	6:38:30	(Czech Republic) Hana Krajnikova	9:49:46
2015 (45 km)	(United Kingdom) Jonathan Albon	6:08:41	(Sweden) Emelie Forsberg	7:09:54
2016	(United Kingdom) Tom Owens	6:45:15	(United Kingdom) Jasmin Paris	8:43:53
2017	(United Kingdom) Jonathan Albon	7:01:01	(Spain) Maite Maiora	8:21:21
2018	(United Kingdom) Jonathan Albon	7:04:06	(United States) Hillary Gerardi	8:14:09
2019	(United Kingdom) Jonathan Albon	6:54:30	(Sweden) Johanna Åström	8:00:49

== Tromsdalstind Skyrace ==
Year	Men's winner	Time	Women's winner	Time
2014 (25 km)	(United States) Dakota Jones	2.25:19	(Norway) Yngvild Kaspersen	2:28:46
2015 (20 km)	(Norway) Stian Hovind-Angermund	2.02.07	(Norway) Yngvild Kaspersen	2:19.28
2016	(Sweden) David Hoimberg	3:13:31	(Norway) Arja Arnesen	3:22:05
2017	(Canada) Hubert Fortin	3:08:26	(Switzerland) Marianne Fatton	3:36:58
2018	(Norway) Eirik Haugsnes	2:58:01	(Norway) Arja Arnesen	3:26:17
2019	(France) Damien Humbert	2:58:03	(Slovenia) Barbara Trunkelj	3:29:14

== Blåmann Vertical ==
Race of Skyrunner World Series
Race of Vertical Kilometer World Circuit

Year	Men's winner	Time	Women's winner	Time
2015	(Norway) Stian Angermund-Vik	36:59	(Sweden) Emelie Forsberg	45:58
2016	(Norway) Stian Angermund-Vik	37:00	(Sweden) Emelie Forsberg	44:49
2017	(Norway) Stian Angermund-Vik	35:20	(Norway) Eli Anne Dvergsdal	43:41
2018	(Norway) Eirik Haugsnes	39:45	(Norway) Therese Sjursen	48:03
2019	(France) Damien Humbert	38:10	(Sweden) Johanna Åström	43:28

== Bønntuva Tour-Race ==
Year	Men's winner	Time	Women's winner	Time
2016	(Norway) Cristoffer Henningsen	1:36:48	(Norway) Karolin Sjöö	2:01:27
2017	(Norway) Vegard Øie	1:24:57	(Norway) Antigone Abazi Nyborg	1:49:43
2018	(Norway) Vilabella Puig	1:24:53	(Spain) Alba Xandri Suets	1:42:11
2019	(Belgium) Basile Richard	1:28:53	(Sweden) Elin Siira	1:52:57

== See also ==
- Skyrunner World Series
