= Luis Alberto Hernando =

Spanish biathlete (born 1977)

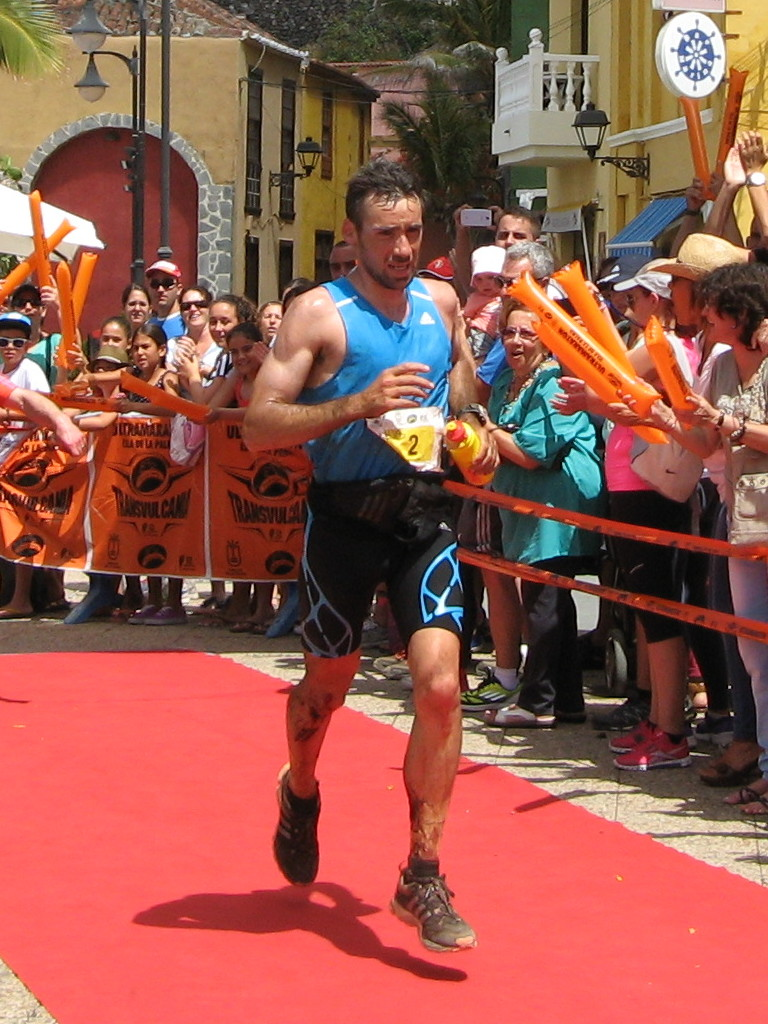
- Luis Alberto Hernando at 2014 Transvulcania

Personal information
- Full name: Luis Alberto Hernando Alzaga
- Nationality: Spanish
- Born: 22 September 1977 (age 48) Burgos
- Height: 1.84 m (6 ft 0 in)
- Weight: 73 kg (161 lb)

Sport
- Country: Spain
- Sport: Skyrunning; Trail running Mountain running Ski mountaineering Biathlon; Cross-country skiing
Medal record
Skyrunning
World Championships
Gold medal – first place	2014 Chamonix	Ultra SkyMarathon
Gold medal – first place	2016 Lleida	Ultra SkyMarathon
Bronze medal – third place	2010 Premana	SkyMarathon
Trail running
World Championships
Gold medal – first place	2016 Gerês	Individual
Gold medal – first place	2017 Badia Prataglia	Individual
Silver medal – second place	2015 Annecy-le-Vieux	Individual
European Championships
Gold medal – first place	2013 Vicenza	Ultra SkyMarathon
Gold medal – first place	2015 Val d’Isère	Ultra SkyMarathon
Gold medal – first place	2017 Val d’Isère	Ultra SkyMarathon
Silver medal – second place	2011 Poschiavo	SkyRace

Luis Alberto Hernando Alzaga (born 22 September 1977) is a Spanish male sky runner champion and before, as biathlete, also competed at the 2006 Winter Olympics.

== Biography ==
He has won four gold medals in two different sports, trail running and sky running, two at Trail World Championships (2016, 2017), and two at the Skyrunning World Championships (2014, 2016). In his career, Hernando has achieved international results in five different sports.

== Achievements ==
Year	Competition	Venue	Position	Event	Time	Notes
Skyrunning
2010	World Championships	(Italy) Premana	3rd	SkyMarathon	3:11:00	
2014	World Championships	(France) Chamonix	1st	Ultra SkyMarathon (80 km)	10:25:52	
2016	World Championships	(Spain) Lleida	1st	Ultra SkyMarathon (105 km)	12:53:42	
Trail running
2015	World Championships	(France) Annecy-le-Vieux	2nd	Individual	8:19.06	
2016	World Championships	(Portugal) Gerês	1st	Individual	8:20.26	
2017	World Championships	(Italy) Badia Prataglia	1st	Individual	4:23.31	
Ski mountaineering
2017	Military World Games	(Russia) Sochi	1st	Team race	2:57:23	
2017	Military World Games	(Russia) Sochi	3rd	Team	2:57:23	
Biathlon
2006	Olympic Games	(Italy) Turin	80th	Individual	59:54.4	
2006	Olympic Games	(Italy) Turin	82nd	Sprint	32:26.0	
Cross-country skiing
2007	World Cup	(Norway) Beitostoelen	19th	Relay 4 x 10 km	1:49:49.2	

== See also ==
- List of multi-sport athletes - Skyrunning
