= Yuri Yoshizumi =

Japanese ultramarathon runner

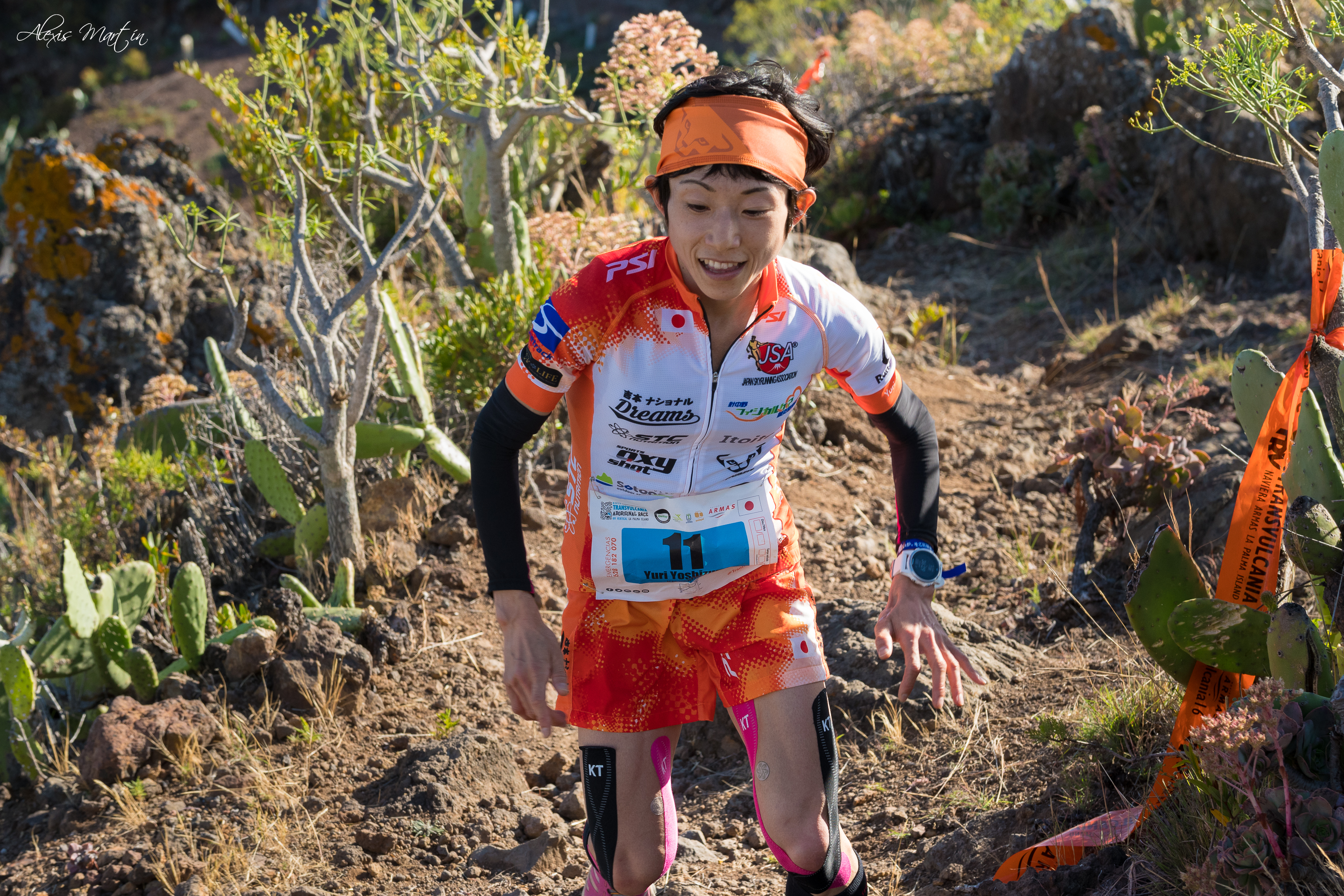
- Yuri Yoshizumi at 2017 Transvulcania KV.
- Born: 1986 (age 39–40)
- Known for: Skyrunning, Ultramarathon

Yuri Yoshizumi (born 1986) is a Japanese ultra runner and skyrunner. She won the Asian Vertical Kilometre Skyrunning Championship in 2016, placed second in the Vertical Kilometer World Circuit in 2019 and won a number of individual events including the 2019 Transvulcania Marathon and the Fuji Mountain Race in 2017, 2018 and 2019.

== Career ==
Yoshizumi started running as an amateur because she was working full-time. She won the 2012 Hokkaido marathon in a time of 2:39:07 and a marathon PB of 2:37:56 the next year, when she finished in 5th place. She finished 2nd in the Kobe Marathon in 2013, in a time of 2:41:00, which secured her a spot in the Chicago Marathon, which she ran as part of the Japanese National Team. Due to a bicycling accident she was unable to run her best, placing 82nd with a time of 2:56:07.

In 2015 she set her sights on trail running and she started skyrunning in 2016. Yoshizumi won the Vertical Kilometer in the 2016 Sky Running Asian Championships in Lantau Island, Hong Kong, where she won in a time of 45:59, which was more than 2 minutes under the previous course record. She ran the 2016 Osaka Tower Run, narrowly beating favourite Suzy Walsham. The same year she placed 13th in the IAU Trail World Championship, an 85 km race, which made her the best Asian runner in the race.

In 2017 Yoshizumi won the Fuji Mountain Race, a 21 km race with 3000 m of elevation, for the first time. She followed this up with a win in 2018, despite having broken her hand a week prior, and in 2019. In 2017 she won the Vertical Kilometer at Transvulcania. She returned in 2019, when she placed second in the Vertical Kilometer and won the marathon event. In 2019 Yoshizumi also placed 2nd on the Vertical Kilometer World Circuit, with individual results including at least 2 second places and a fourth-place finish.

In 2019 Yoshizumi also participated in the Orsières-Champex-Chamonix (OCC) race, which is one of the races in the Ultra-Trail du Mont-Blanc, where she placed 3rd.
