= Borja Fernández =

Borja Fernández may refer to:

- Borja Fernández (footballer, born 1981), Spanish football midfielder
- Borja Fernández (footballer, born 1995), Spanish football midfielder
- Borja Fernández (skater) (born 1984), professional vert skater
- Borja Vidal Fernández Fernández (born 1981), handballer and former basketball player
