= 2017 Trail World Championships =

- Location: (Italy) Badia Prataglia
- Date: 10 June 2017

Champions
- Men: (Spain) Luis Alberto Hernando
- Women: (France) Adeline Roche

The 2017 Trail World Championships was the 7th edition of the global trail running competition, Trail World Championships, organised by the International Association of Ultrarunners (IAU) and was held in Badia Prataglia (Italy), the 10 June 2017.

== Results ==
=== Men ===
Rank	Gold	Silver	Bronze
Individual	(Spain) Luis Alberto Hernando; 4h 23' 31"	(Spain) Cristofer Clemente; 4h 24' 31"	(France) Cédric Fleureton; 4h 28' 03"
Team	Spain; 13h 17' 32"; Luis Alberto Hernando (1st) 4h 23' 31"; Cristofer Clemente (2nd) 4h 24' 31"; Daní Garcia (5th) 4h 29' 30"	France; 13h 43' 05"; Cédric Fleureton (3rd) 4h 28' 03"; Ludovic Pommeret (6th) 4h 30' 47"; Benoit Cori (14th) 4h 44' 15"	United States; 14h 16' 52"; Mario Mendoza (9th) 4h 41' 32"; Cody Reed (15th) 4h 44' 56"; Andy Wacker (20th) 4h 50' 24"

=== Women ===
Rank	Gold	Silver	Bronze
Individual	(France) Adeline Roche; 5h 00' 44"	(France) Amandine Ferrato; 5h 00' 47"	(Italy) Silvia Rampazzo; 5h 11' 07"
Team	France; 15h 17' 41"; Adeline Roche (1st) 5h 00' 44"; Amandine Ferrato (2nd) 5h 00' 47"; Nathalie Mauclair (5th) 5h 16' 10"	Italy; 16h 05' 08"; Silvia Rampazzo (3rd) 5h 11' 07"; Gloria Rita Giudici (12th) 5h 25' 36"; Barbara Bani (15th) 5h 28' 25"	Spain; 16h 26' 04"; Laia Cañes (7th) 5h 19' 36"; Anna Comet (14th) 5h 27' 59"; Gemma Arenas Alcázar (25th) 5h 38' 29"
