= 2014 Skyrunning World Championships =

- Host city: Chamonix
- Country: France
- Events: Vertical Kilometer; SkyMarathon; Ultra SkyMarathon
- Opening: June 27, 2014
- Closing: June 29, 2014
- Website: skyrunning.com

The 2014 Skyrunning World Championships was the 2nd edition of the global skyrunning competition, Skyrunning World Championships, organised by the International Skyrunning Federation and was held in French side of Mont Blanc from 27 to 29 July 2014.

== Results ==
=== Ultra SkyMarathon (80 km) ===
==== Men ====
Rank	Athlete	Country	Time
1st place, gold medalist(s)	Luis Alberto Hernando	Spain	10:25:52
2nd place, silver medalist(s)	François D'Haene	France	10:29:33
3rd place, bronze medalist(s)	Ben Duffus	Australia	10:52:33
4	Clement Petitjean	France	10:57:04
5	Philipp Reiter	Germany	11:09:36
6	Blake Hose	Australia	11:14:26
7	Aurelien Dunand Pallaz	France	11:31:05
8	Mike Wolfe	United States	11:31:20
9	Caine Warburton	Australia	11:31:32
10	Sverre Slethaug	Norway	11:43:57

==== Women ====
Rank	Athlete	Country	Time
1st place, gold medalist(s)	Emelie Forsberg	Sweden	12:38:49
2nd place, silver medalist(s)	Anna Frost	New Zealand	12:46:52
3rd place, bronze medalist(s)	Magdalena Laczak	Poland	12:58:51
4	Maud Gobert	France	13:16:11
5	Caroline Chaverot	France	13:28:52
6	Federica Boifava	Italy	13:34:23
7	Uxue Fraille Azpeitia	Spain	13:40:01
8	Fernanda Maciel	Brazil	14:03:54
9	Li Dong	China	14:11:20
10	Juliette Blanchet	France	14:20:50

=== Vertical Kilometer ===
==== Men ====
Rank	Athlete	Country	Time
1st place, gold medalist(s)	Kilian Jornet	Spain	00:34:18
2nd place, silver medalist(s)	Bernard Dematteis	Italy	00:34:36
3rd place, bronze medalist(s)	Urban Zemmer	Italy	00:34:37
4	Saul Antonio Padua Rodriguez	Colombia	00:35:01
5	Toru Miyahara	Japan	00:35:57
6	Thorbjorn Ludvigsen	Norway	00:36:17
7	Travis Macy	United States	00:36:29
8	Aritz Egea	Spain	00:36:32
9	Alexy Sevennec Verdier	France	00:36:36
10	Pascal Egli	Switzerland	00:36:53

==== Women ====
Rank	Athlete	Country	Time
1st place, gold medalist(s)	Laura Orgué Vila	Spain	00:41:29
2nd place, silver medalist(s)	Stevie Kremer	United States	00:41:37
3rd place, bronze medalist(s)	Christel Dewalle	France	00:41:50
4	Antonella Confortola	Italy	00:43:17
5	Maite Maiora Elizondo	Spain	00:43:31
6	Kasie Enman	United States	00:43:52
7	Stephanie Jimenez	France	00:43:55
8	Francesca Rossi	Italy	00:45:13
9	Therese Sjursen	Norway	00:45:15
10	Axelle Mollaret	France	00:45:34

=== SkyMarathon (42 km) ===
==== Men ====
Rank	Athlete	Country	Time
1st place, gold medalist(s)	Kilian Jornet	Spain	3:23:39
2nd place, silver medalist(s)	Michel Lanne	France	3:25:41
3rd place, bronze medalist(s)	Thomas Owens	United Kingdom	3:26:11
4	Marc Lauenstein	Switzerland	3:26:21
5	Manuel Merillas Moledo	Spain	3:27:41
6	Eirik Dagssonn Haugsnes	Norway	3:27:58
7	Aritz Egea	Spain	3:30:08
8	Marcin Swierc	Poland	3:31:31
9	Florian Reichert	Germany	3:37:45
10	Greg Vollet	France	3:39:08

==== Women ====
Rank	Athlete	Country	Time
1st place, gold medalist(s)	Elisa Desco	Italy	03:53:33
2nd place, silver medalist(s)	Megan Kimmel	United States	03:54:51
3rd place, bronze medalist(s)	Stevie Kremer	United States	03:55:36
4	Kasie Enman	United States	04:03:14
5	Azahara Garcia	Spain	04:05:41
6	Maite Maiora Elizondo	Spain	04:08:41
7	Anne Lise Rousset	France	04:09:39
8	Hiske Weissmann	Germany	04:11:49
9	Nuria Dominguez Azpeleta	Spain	04:13:21
10	Laia Andreu Trias	Spain	04:18:29
