= Patrick Facchini =

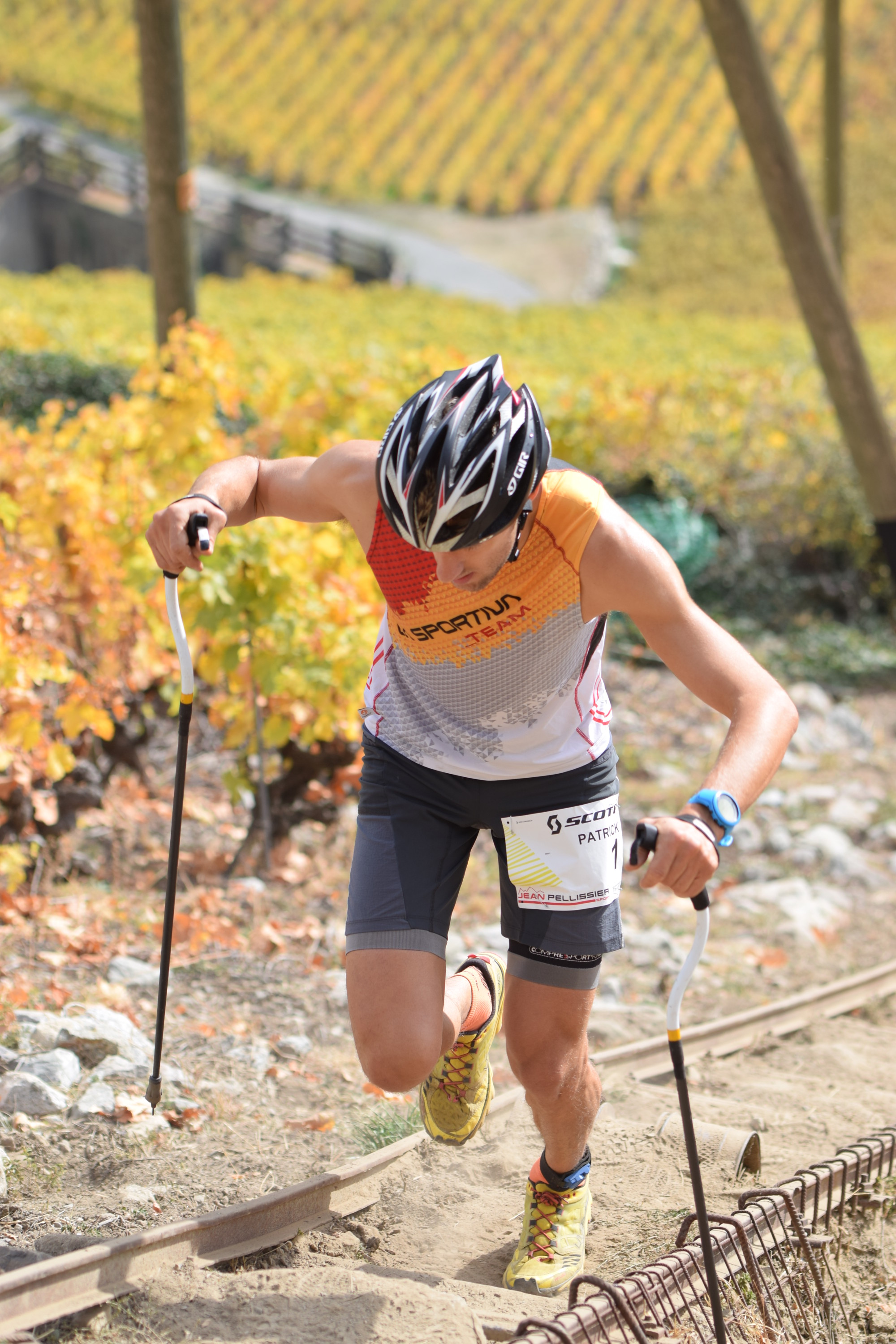
- Patrick Facchini at 2017 Kilomètre vertical de Fully

Personal information
- Full name: Patrick Facchini
- Nickname: The Hawk
- Born: 28 January 1988 (age 38) Trento, Italy
- Height: 1.88 m (6 ft 2 in)
- Weight: 70 kg (150 lb)

Cycling career
- Sport: Cycling
- Discipline: Road
- Role: Rider

Professional team
- 2013–2014: Androni Giocattoli–Venezuela
Medal record
Representing Italy
Skyrunning
European Championships
Silver medal – second place	2016 Limone	Vertical Kilometer

Patrick Facchini (born 28 January 1988 in Trento) is an Italian former road bicycle racer, and current mountain runner. He turned professional for the 2013 season, joining UCI Professional Continental team Androni Giocattoli–Venezuela.

== Anti-doping rule violation ==
Facchini tested positive for Tuaminoheptane at the Tour of Belgium on 30 May 2014 and was subsequently handed a 10-month ban from sports by UCI. His contract with Androni Giocattoli–Venezuela was terminated.

== Palmarès ==
2009
1st Trofeo Rosalpina
Baby Giro

1st Stage 1

4th Cronoscalata Gardone Val Trompia-Prati di Caregno
5th GP Palio del Recioto
2010
5th Trofeo Franco Balestra
7th Trofeo Zssdi
2011
1st Memorial Gerry Gasparotto
2nd Trofeo Gianfranco Bianchin
8th Overall Giro del Friuli
8th GP Capodarco
8th Ruota d'Oro
2012
1st Trofeo Rigoberto Lamonica
1st Memorial Pigoni Coli
1st Cronoscalata Cornino-Monte Prat
1st Freccia dei Vini-Memorial Dottor Luigi Raffele
1st Cronoscalata Gardone Val Trompia-Prati di Caregno
1st Trofeo Franco Balestra
1st Trofeo Zssdi
5th Overall Giro delle Valli Cuneesi nelle Alpi del mare

1st Stage 2

8th Piccolo Giro di Lombardia
10th Ruota d'Oro

== National titles ==
- Italian Vertical Kilometer Championships
  - Vertical kilometer: 2017
