= Stevie Kremer =

American ski mountaineer and long-distance runner

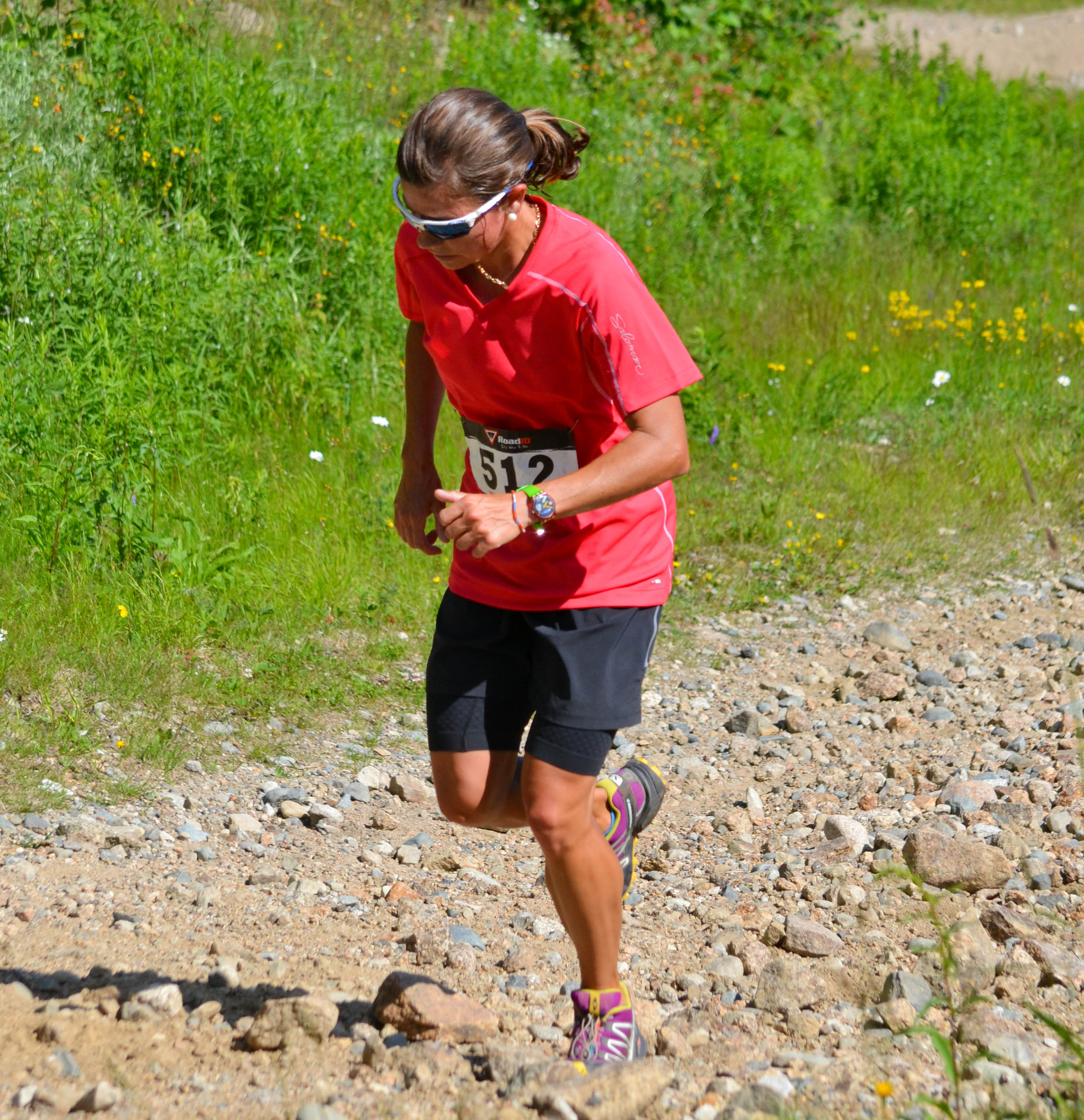

Personal information
- Born: 1982 (age 43–44) Düsseldorf, Germany

Sport
- Sport: Skiing
Medal record
Representing United States
Women's skyrunning
World Championships
Silver medal – second place	2014 Chamonix	Vertical Kilometer
Bronze medal – third place	2014 Chamonix	SkyMarathon
Women's ski mountaineering
North American Championship
Bronze medal – third place	2012 Colorado	Individual

Stevie Kremer (born 1982) is an American ski mountaineer and long-distance runner.

== Career ==
Kremer was born in Bad Soden, Germany. She attended Darien High School, and afterwards Colorado College. She lives in Crested Butte, Colorado, and works as a second-grade teacher at the Crested Butte Community School.

== Selected results ==
=== Ski mountaineering ===
- 2012:
  - 3rd, North American Championship, individual
  - 3rd, North American Championship, total ranking
  - 6th, North American Championship, sprint

=== Running ===
- 2016
  - 1st, Olympus Marathon, Greece (44 km)
- 2014
  - 1st, Matterhorn Ultraks 46 km Skyrace, Switzerland (46 km)
  - 1st, Sierre-Zinal Mountain Race, Switzerland (31 km)
- 2013
  - 1st, Limone Extreme Skyrace, Italy (23.5 km)
  - 2nd, Sierre-Zinal Mountain Race, Switzerland (31 km)
  - 1st, Hermannslauf, Germany (31.1 km)
  - 1st, Marathon du Mont Blanc, France
- 2012
  - 1st, Jungfrau Marathon, Switzerland; World Long Distance Mountain Running Challenge
  - 2nd, Sierre-Zinal Mountain Race, Switzerland (31 km)
  - 1st, Mount Evans Ascent, Idaho Springs, CO (14.5 miles); Women's Course Record
  - 1st, Golden Leaf Half Marathon; Aspen, CO
- 2011:
  - 1st, Barr Trail Mountain Race (USTAF championship)
  - 1st and course record, Lead King Loop (25 km)
  - 1st, Golden Leaf Half Marathon; Aspen, CO
  - 1st, Greenland Trail Race (25 km); Women's Course Record
