= Purity Kajuju Gitonga =

Kenyan long-distance runner (born 1996)

Purity Kajuju Gìtonga
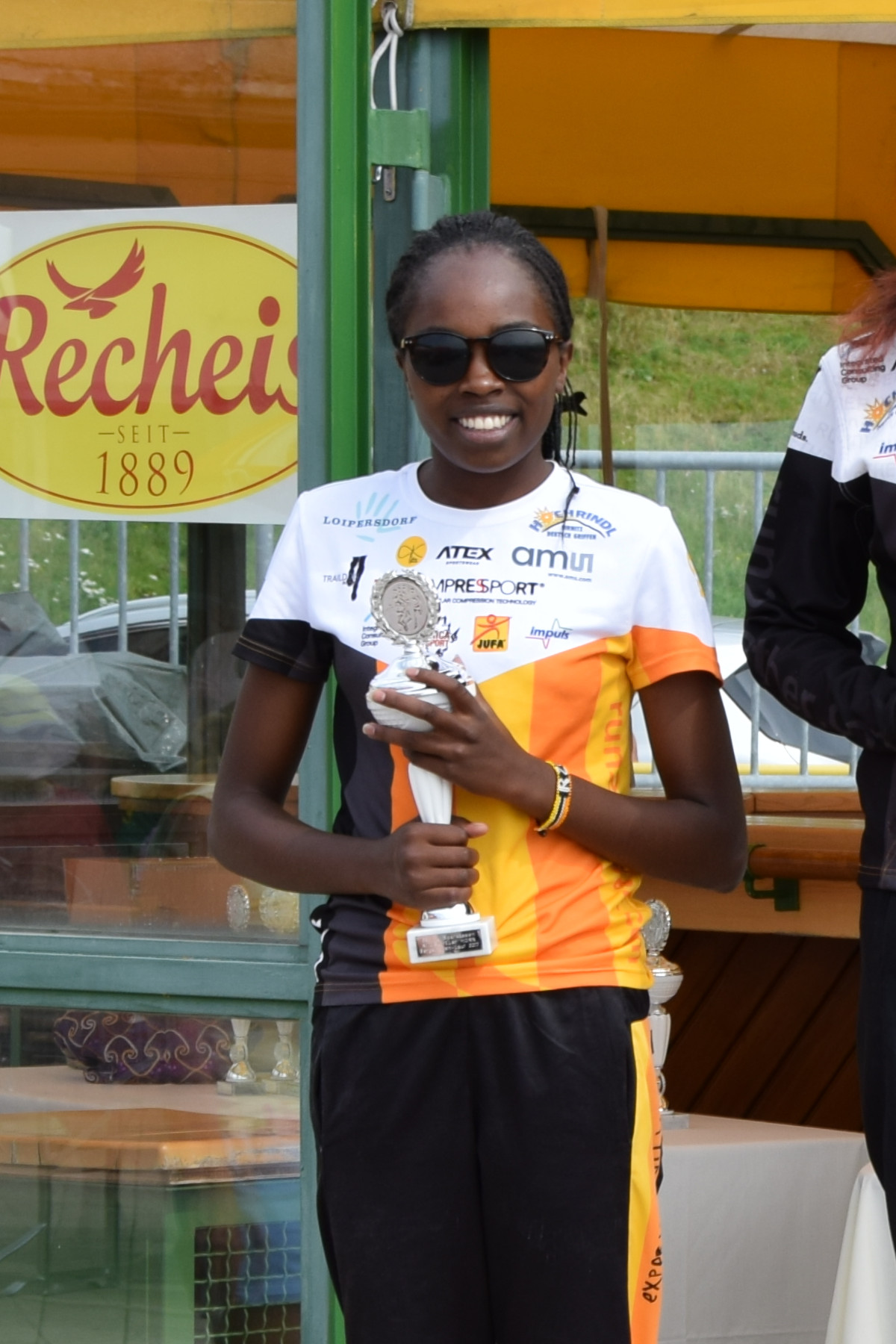
- in 2017

Personal information
- Nationality: Kenyan
- Born: 12 May 1996 (age 30)

Sport
- Sport: Athletics
- Events: Long-distance running, Mountain running

Achievements and titles
- Personal bests: 3000m: 8:39.36 (Ostrava, 2025)
Medal record
Women's mountain running
Representing Kenya
World Championships
Gold medal – first place	2018 Andorra	Team

Purity Kajuju Gìtonga (born 12 May 1996) is a female Kenyan mountain runner and long-distance runner.

== Biography ==
She won a gold medal in the team event at the 2018 World Mountain Running Championships in Andorra. She was runner-up at the World Mountain Running Association (WMRA) Mountain Running World Cup at Grossglockner Berglauf in 2019 and 2021. She won the inaugural Mt. Kenya Mountain Running Championship in Meru County in 2021.

In June 2023, she won the World Athletics Bronze Label Race over 10 km on the roads in Karlovac, Croatia. Later that year, she won the Hamburg 10 km road race and the Udine half marathon in Italy.

In April 2024, she won the Paderborner Osterlauf 10 km race in Paderborn, Germany. In October 2024, she won the Bilbao Night Marathon in a time of 1:08:52. She was runner-up at the 2024 Prievidza 10 km Road Race.

In February 2025, she set a 3000 metres indoors personal best of 8:39.36, running in Ostrava. She was selected for the 3000 metres race at the 2025 World Athletics Indoor Championships in Nanjing in March 2025, Kenya's sole representative in the women's 3000m race.

== Personal life ==
She is from the Kibirichia ward in Buuri Sub County, Meru County, Kenya, but is based in Iten, Kenya. Her twin sister Caroline Makandi Gitonga is also a competitive distance runner.
