= Vertical Kilometer World Circuit =

- Genre: sporting event
- Date: from May to October
- Frequency: annual
- Location: various
- Inaugurated: 2017
- Most recent: 2019
- Organiser: ISF
- Website: Vertical Kilometer World Circuit

The Vertical Kilometer World Circuit was an annual international circuit of vertical kilometer (a skyrunning discipline) run between 2017 and 2019 as a spin-off of Skyrunner World Series. In its final season in 2019, the circuit featured eighteen races across Europe, Asia, and the Americas.

== 2017 edition ==
The winners of the first edition were the Norwegian Stian Angermund and the Spanish Laura Orgué.

=== Results ===
The circuit consists of 17 races that are held from May to October.

Bonus races (20% extra points)

#	Date	Race	Venue	Country	Men's winner	Women's winner
1	7 May	Trentapassi Vertical Race	Marone, Brescia	Italy	Davide Magnini (ITA)	Valentina Belotti (ITA)
2	11 May	Transvulcania Vertical Kilometer	Tazacorte, La Palma	Spain	Stian Angermund (NOR)	Yuri Yoshizumi (JPN)
3	26 May	Zegama-Aizkorri Kilometro Vertical	Basque Country	Spain	Stian Angermund (NOR)	Laura Orgué (ESP)
4	4 June	Santana Vertical Kilometer	Madeira	Portugal	Ferran Teixido (AND)	Ekaterina Mityaeva (RUS)
5	11 June	KM Vertical Fuente Dé	Cantabria	Spain	Ferran Teixido (AND)	Maite Maiora (ESP)
6	16 June	Santa Caterina Vertical Kilometer	Sondrio	Italy	Michele Boscacci (ITA)	Valentina Belotti (ITA)
7	7 July	Kilomètre Vertical Face De Bellevarde	Val d’Isère	France	Xavier Gachet (ITA)	Jessica Pardin (ITA)
8	9 July	Vertical Cabanera	Capdella	Spain	Jan Margarit (ESP)	Laura Orgué (ESP)
9	20 July	Dolomites Vertical Kilometer	Canazei	Italy	Patrick Facchini (ITA)	Axelle Mollaret (FRA)
10	29 July	Red Bull K3	Rocciamelone, Susa	Italy	Martin Anthamatten (SUI)	Camilla Magliano (ITA)
11	4 August	Blåmann Vertical	Tromsø	Norway	Stian Angermund (NOR)	Eli Anne Dvergsdal (NOR)
12	1 September	Lone Peak Vertical Kilometer	Montana	United States	JP Donovan (USA)	Laura Orgué (ESP)
13	15 September	Salomon Mamores VK	Glen Coe	United Kingdom	Stian Angermund (NOR)	Laura Orgué (ESP)
14	1 October	Verticale du Grand Serre	Cholonge	France	Martin Anthamatten (SUI)	Christel Dewalle (FRA)
15	6 October	Pico Mountain VK	Azores	Portugal	Xavier Gachet (ITA)	Christel Dewalle (FRA)
16	13 October	Grèste de la Mughera Vertical Kilometer	Limone sul Garda	Italy	Philip Goetsch (ITA)	Christel Dewalle (FRA)
17	21 October	Kilomètre Vertical de Fully	Fully	Switzerland	Philip Goetsch (ITA)	Christel Dewalle (FRA)

=== Men's final standings ===
Rank	Athlete	Points
1	Stian Angermund (NOR)	556
2	Patrick Facchini (ITA)	514.8
3	Nejc Kuhar (SLO)	468.4

=== Women's final standings ===
Rank	Athlete	Points
1	Laura Orgué (ESP)	554
2	Victoria Kreuzer (SUI)	553.2
3	Stephanie Jimenez (ITA)	456.3

== 2018 edition ==
=== Men's final standings ===
Rank	Athlete	Points
1	Rémi Bonnet (SUI)	500
2	Pascal Egli (SUI)	499
3	Ferran Teixido Marti-Ventosa (AND)	495

== 2019 Edition ==
=== Men's final standings ===
Rank	Athlete	Points
2	Daniel Osanz Laborda (ESP)	525
1	Camille Caparros (FRA)	372
3	Yoann Caillot (FRA)	362

=== Women's final standings ===
Rank	Athlete	Country	Points
1	Jessica Pardin (FRA)	560	
2	Yuri Yoshizumi (JPN)	332	
3	Oihana Azkorbebeitia (ESP)	313	

== See also ==
- Skyrunner World Series
