= 2018 World Mountain Running Championships =

- Organisers: WMRA
- Edition: 34th
- Date: 16 September
- Host city: Canillo, Andorra
- Events: 6

The 2018 World Mountain Running Championships was the 34th edition of the global mountain running competition, World Mountain Running Championships, organised by the World Mountain Running Association and was held in Canillo, Andorra on 16 September 2018.

== Results ==
=== Men ===
Distance 12 km, total ascent of 1030 m total descent of 120 m, participants 108.

Rank	Athlete	Country	Time
Gold medal	Robert Chemonges	Uganda	55:37
Silver medal	Joel Ayeko	Uganda	55:38
Bronze medal	Victor Kiplangat	Uganda	55:54
4	Joseph Gray	United States	57:08
5	Johan Bugge	Norway	58:25
6	Jacob Adkin	Great Britain	58:31
7	Francesco Puppi	Italy	59:12
8	Martin Dematteis	Italy	59:31
9	Bernard Dematteis	Italy	59:48
10	Juan Carlos Carera	Mexico	1:00:02
11	Emmanuel Meyssat	France	1:00:09
12	Nadir Cavagna	Italy	1:00:15
13	Nicolas Alejandro Herrera	Colombia	1:00:23
14	Timothy Kimutai Kirui	Kenya	1:00:36
15	Ridvan Taş	Turkey	1:00:49
16	Christopher Arthur	United Kingdom	1:00:59
17	Alexandre Fine	France	1:01:14
18	Torstein Tengsareid	Norway	1:01:22
19	Hakon Skarsholt	Norway	1:01:31
20	Fabien Demure	France	1:01:33

=== Men team ===
Rank	Country	Athletes	Points
1st place, gold medalist(s)	Uganda	Robert Chemonges; Joel Ayeko; Victor Kiplangat	1+2+3=6
2nd place, silver medalist(s)	Italy	Francesco Puppi; Martin Dematteis; Bernard Dematteis; Nadir Cavagna	7+8+9=24
3rd place, bronze medalist(s)	Norway	Johan Bugge; Torstein Tengsareid; Hakon Skarsholt; Stian Øvergaard Aarvik	5+18+19=42
4	United Kingdom	Jacob Adkin; Christopher Arthur; Andrew Douglas; Maximilian Nicholls	6+16+25=47

=== Women ===
Distance 12 km, total ascent of 1030 m total descent of 120 m, participants 77.

Rank	Athlete	Country	Time
Gold medal	Lucy Wambui Murigi	Kenya	1:04:55
Silver medal	Maude Mathys	Switzerland	1:06:00
Bronze medal	Viola Jelagat	Kenya	1:06:26
4	Patricia Chepkwemoi	Uganda	1:06:02
5	Kristýna Dvořáková	Czech Republic	1:07:20
6	Andrea Mayr	Austria	1:07:37
7	Emily Collinge	Great Britain	1:07:57
8	Silvia Schwaiger	Slovakia	1:09:24
9	Christel Dewalle	France	1:09:46
10	Sarah Tunstall	United Kingdom	1:10:24
11	Emily Setlack	Canada	1:10:56
12	Elisa Sortini	Italy	1:11:17
13	Joyce Muthoni Njeru	Kenya	1:11:20
14	Stefanie Doll	Germany	1:11:26
15	Nancy Jiang	New Zealand	1:11:33
16	Anaïs Sabrié	France	1:11:35
17	Annie Bersagel	United States	1:11:58
18	Sarah McCormack	Ireland	1:12:21
19	Erica Ghelfi	Italy	1:12:54
20	Addie Bracy	United States	1:13:16

=== Women team ===
Rank	Country	Athletes	Points
1st place, gold medalist(s)	Kenya	Lucy Wambui Murigi; Viola Jelagat; Joyce Muthoni Njeru; Purity Kajuju Gitonga	1+3+13=17
2nd place, silver medalist(s)	Great Britain	Emily Collinge; Sarah Tunstall; Emma Gould; Bethany Hanson	7+10+22=39
3rd place, bronze medalist(s)	France	Christel Dewalle; Anais Sabrié; Elise Poncet; Adeline Roche	9+16+24=49
4th	Italy	Elisa Sortini; Erica Ghelfi; Emma Linda Quaglia; Gloria Rita Antonia Giudici	12+19+23=54

=== Junior Men ===
Distance 7.3 km, total ascent of 580 m total descent of 120 m, participants 64.

Rank	Athlete	Country	Time
Gold medal	Dan Chebet	Uganda	35:49
Silver medal	Mathew Chepkurui	Uganda	36:05
Bronze medal	Oscar Chelimo	Uganda	36:42
4	Joseph Dugdale	United Kingdom	39:37
5	Gabriel Bularda	Romania	39:54
6	Hüseyin Can	Turkey	40:08
7	Matthew Mackay	United Kingdom	40:17
8	İslam Adli	Turkey	40:24
9	Veysel Timünçin	Turkey	40:35
10	Isacco Costa	Italy	40:37
11	Jack White	United Kingdom	40:40
12	Ahmet Alkanoğlu	Turkey	40:49
13	Dylan Ribeiro	France	40:55
14	Peter Herman	Romania	41:03
15	Theo Detienne	France	41:13
16	Per-Christian Faerovik Grieg	Norway	41:15
17	Mario Salazar	Mexico	41:22
18	Giovanni Rossi	Italy	41:32
19	Adrian Garcea	Romania	41:38
20	Marcin Kubica	Poland	41:48

=== Junior Men team ===
Rank	Country	Athletes	Points
1st place, gold medalist(s)	Uganda	Dan Chebet; Mathew Chepkurui; Oscar Chelimo	1+2+3=6
2nd place, silver medalist(s)	United Kingdom	Joseph Dugdale; Matthew Mackay; Jack White; Euan Brennan	4+7+11=22
3rd place, bronze medalist(s)	Turkey	Hüseyin Can; Islam Adli; Veysel Timünçin; Ahmet Alkanoğlu	6+8+9=23
4th	Romania	Gabriel Bularda; Peter Herman; Adrian Garcea; Marius Turcu	5+14+19=38

=== Junior Women ===
Distance 7.3 km, total ascent of 580 m total descent of 120 m, participants 56.

Rank	Athlete	Country	Time
Gold medal	Risper Chebet	Uganda	41:19
Silver medal	Lisa Oed	Germany	41:54
Bronze medal	Betty Chebet	Uganda	43:07
4	Alessia Scaini	Italy	43:30
5	Angela Mattevi	Italy	44:08
6	Alexia Hecico	Romania	45:22
7	Malaurie Mattana	France	45:25
8	Esther Yego Chepkwemoi	Uganda	0:45:53
9	Gaia Colli	Italy	46:12
10	Constance Parrot	France	46:42
11	Angelica Olenici	Romania	46:47
12	Loredana Viziteu	Romania	47:01
13	Barbora Havlíčková	Czech Republic	47:13
14	Anna Shults	United States	47:15
15	Eylem Gür	Turkey	47:42
16	Dilek Öztürk	Turkey	47:55
17	Lauren Dickson	United Kingdom	48:10
18	Joslin Blair	United States	48:21
19	Irina Bordeianu	Romania	48:21
20	Sabriye Güzelyurt	Turkey	48:43

=== Junior Women team ===
Rank	Country	Athletes	Points
1st place, gold medalist(s)	Uganda	Risper Chebet; Betty Chebet; Esther Yego Chepkwemoi	1+3+8=12
2nd place, silver medalist(s)	Italy	Alessia Scaini; Angela Mattevi; Gaia Colli; Linda Palumbo	4+5+9=18
3rd place, bronze medalist(s)	Romania	Alexia Hecico; Angelica Olenici; Loredana Viziteu; Irina Bordeianu	6+11+12=29
4th	France	Malaurie Mattana; Constance Parrot; Emma Vella; Manon Cumy	7+10+32=49
