= Eva Moreda =

Spanish mountain race runner (born 1978)

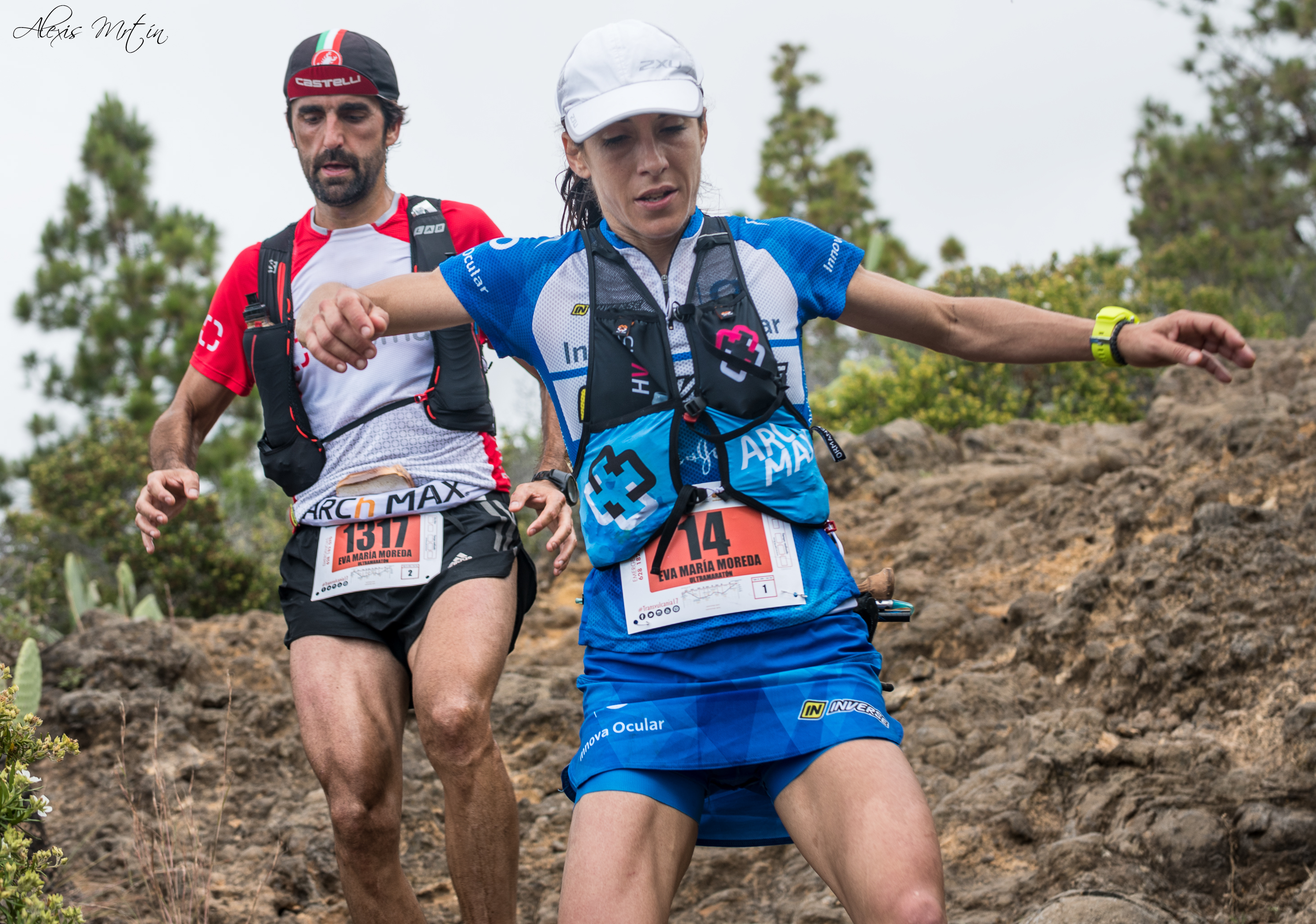
- Eva Moreda at 2017 Transvulcania.

Personal information
- Full name: Eva Maria Moreda Gabaldón
- Nationality: Spanish
- Born: 7 April 1978 (age 48) Palma de Mallorca
- Height: 1.62 m (5 ft 4 in)
- Weight: 49 kg (108 lb)

Sport
- Country: Spain
- Sport: Skyrunning
Medal record
World Championships
Silver medal – second place	2016 Lleida	Ultra SkyMarathon

Eva Moreda, full name Eva Maria Moreda Gabaldón (born 7 April 1978) is a Spanish female sky runner, vice-world champion in the Ultra SkyMarathon at the 2016 Skyrunning World Championships.
