= Kilomètre vertical de Fully =

International skyrunning competition

- Date: July
- Location: (Switzerland) Fully
- Event type: Vertical Kilometer
- Distance: 1.9 km / 1,000 m D+
- Established: 2001
- Website: kmvertical.ch

The Kilomètre vertical de Fully is an international skyrunning competition held for the first time in 2001. It is held every year in July in Fully (Switzerland) and is valid for the Vertical Kilometer World Circuit.

The race begins at the hydro powerplant Belle Usine and follows the route of the defunct cable car that was built in 1912, and once serviced the Fully dam which is located at 2130 meters, though the race ends after gaining exactly 1000 meters of altitude, at Les Garettes.

== Editions ==
Race of Skyrunner World Series
Race of Vertical Kilometer World Circuit

| Year | Edition | Men's winner | Time | Women's winner | Time | Notes |
|---|---|---|---|---|---|---|
| 2001 | 1st | (Switzerland) Emmanuel Vaudan | 32:54 | (Switzerland) Catherine Mabillard | 42:13 | |
| 2002 | 2nd | (Italy) Ezio Bordet | 34:23 | (Switzerland) Cristina Favre-Moretti | 38:48 | |
| 2003 | 3rd | (Switzerland) Emmanuel Vaudan | 33.57 | (Switzerland) Cristina Favre-Moretti | 39:00 | |
| 2004 | 4th | (Switzerland) Emmanuel Vaudan | 32:18 | (Switzerland) Cristina Favre-Moretti | 38:09 | |
| 2005 | 5th | (France) Jean-Christophe Dupont | 34:21 | (Italy) Chiara Raso | 40:16 | |
| 2006 | 6th | (Spain) Kilian Jornet | 31:55 | (Switzerland) Colette Borcard | 39:17 | |
| 2007 | 7th | (Spain) Kilian Jornet | 31:52 | (Switzerland) Nathalie Etzensperger | 40:26 | |
| 2008 | 8th | (France) Pierre Chauvet | 32:06 | (Spain) Mireia Miró Varela | 40:35 | |
| 2009 | 9th | (France) Serge Garnier | 32:14 | (France) Laëtitia Roux | 37:55 | |
| 2010 | 10th | (Switzerland) Emmanuel Vaudan | 30:56 | (Switzerland) Nathalie Etzensperger | 39:59 | WR men |
| 2011 | 11th | (Italy) Manfred Reichegger | 30:46 | (Switzerland) Maude Mathys | 38:24 | WR men |
| 2012 | 12th | (Italy) Urban Zemmer | 30:26 | (France) Christel Dewalle | 36:48 | WR men |
| 2013 | 13th | (Italy) Urban Zemmer | 30:54 | (France) Christel Dewalle | 37:17 | |
| 2014 | 14th | (Italy) Urban Zemmer | 29:42 | (France) Christel Dewalle | 34:44 | WR men & women |
| 2015 | 15th | (Italy) Urban Zemmer | 30:11 | (France) Jessica Pardin | 39:45 | |
| 2016 | 16th | (Italy) Nadir Maguet | 30:17 | (France) Christel Dewalle | 35:57 | |
| 2017 | 17th | (Italy) Philip Goetsch | 28:53 | (France) Christel Dewalle | 35:10 | REC men |
| 2018 | 18th | (Italy) Henri Aymonod | 30:48 | (France) Christel Dewalle | 35:38 | |
| 2019 | 19th | (Italy) Henri Aymonod | 31:36 | (France) Christel Dewalle | 34:49 | |
| 2020 | | Race cancelled | | | | |
| 2021 | | Race cancelled | | | | |
| 2022 | 20th | (Italy) Henri Aymonod | 31:01 | (France) Christel Dewalle | 34:14 | |
| 2023 | 21st | (Switzerland) Aurélien Gay | 31:24 | (France) Christel Dewalle | 34:12 | |
| 2024 | 22nd | (Italy) Henri Aymonod | 29:56 | (France) Christel Dewalle | 33:43 | |
| 2025 | 23rd | (Switzerland) Rémi Bonnet | 27:21 | (France) Axelle Mollaret | 32:52 | WR men & women |

== See also ==
- Vertical Kilometer World Circuit
- Skyrunner World Series
