= Juan Bazo de Moreda =

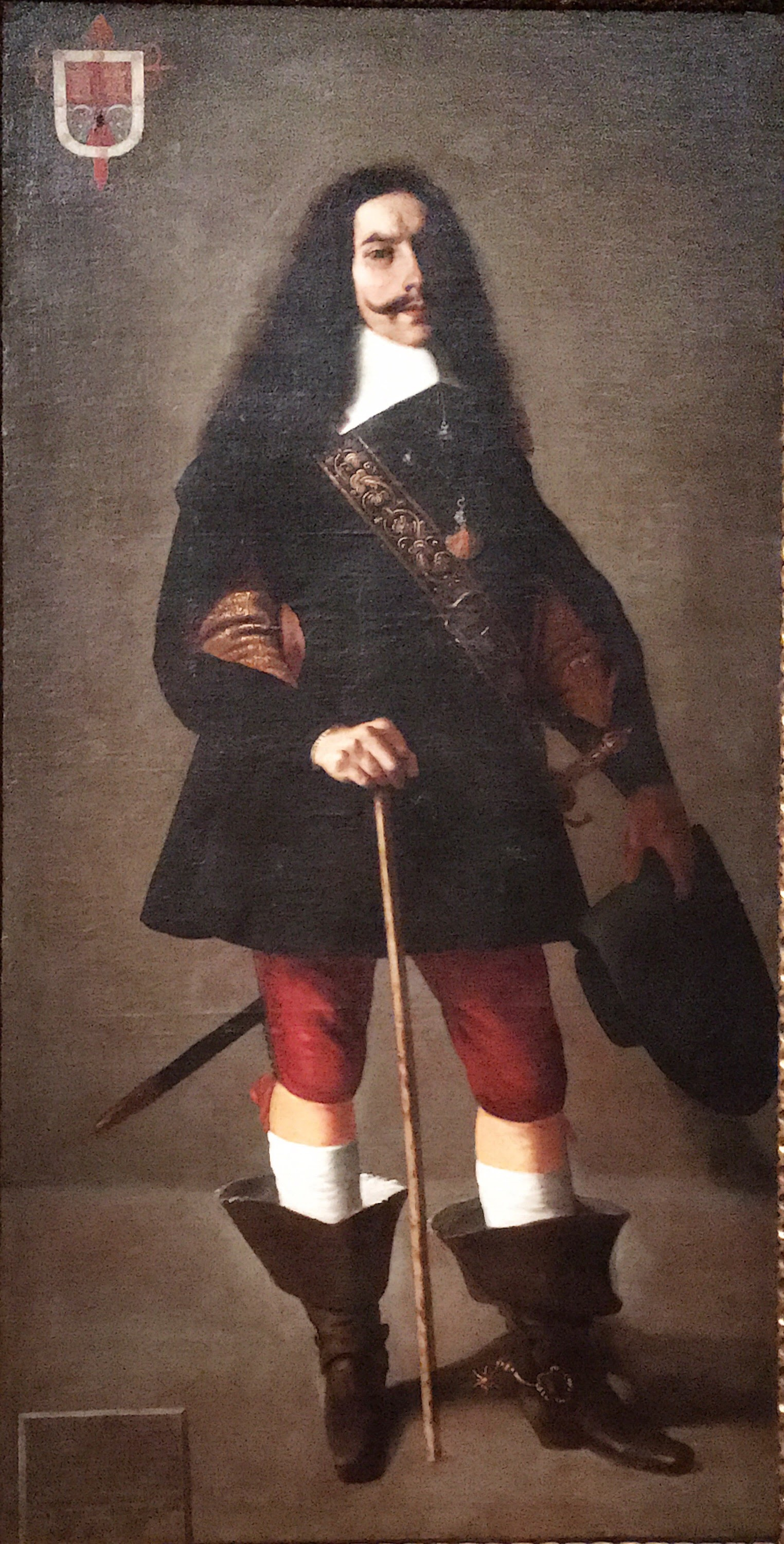
A memorial portrait of Juan Bazo de Moreda by Francisco de Zurbarán in 1655.

Juan Bazo de Moreda (1614 in Logroño, Spanish Empire – 1654 in Diksmuide, Bélgica) was a Spanish noble of the House of Moreda and Knight of the Order of Santiago who served as the Sargento Mayor of Spain's Tercios in Flanders and as Regidor of Logroño.

== Early life and family history ==
Moreda was born to a merchant family in the city of Logroño without any landed title. One of his brothers, Sebastián Bazo de Moreda became a friar.

== Biography ==
Moreda became a Knight of the Order of Santiago in 1652.

== Death and legacy ==
Moreda was painted by Francisco de Zurbarán in 1655 after his death. His house sigil is etched in metal above his family house at number 24 Los Portales Street in his hometown of Logroño. His great-grandson was Sebastián Andrés de Bazo y Moreda, a Spanish military figure. Another family member, possibly his son, Sebastián Andrés de Bazo y Ayala, became a Knight of the Order of Santiago in 1666.
