= Stian Angermund =

Norwegian sky runner, Mountain runner, Trail runner

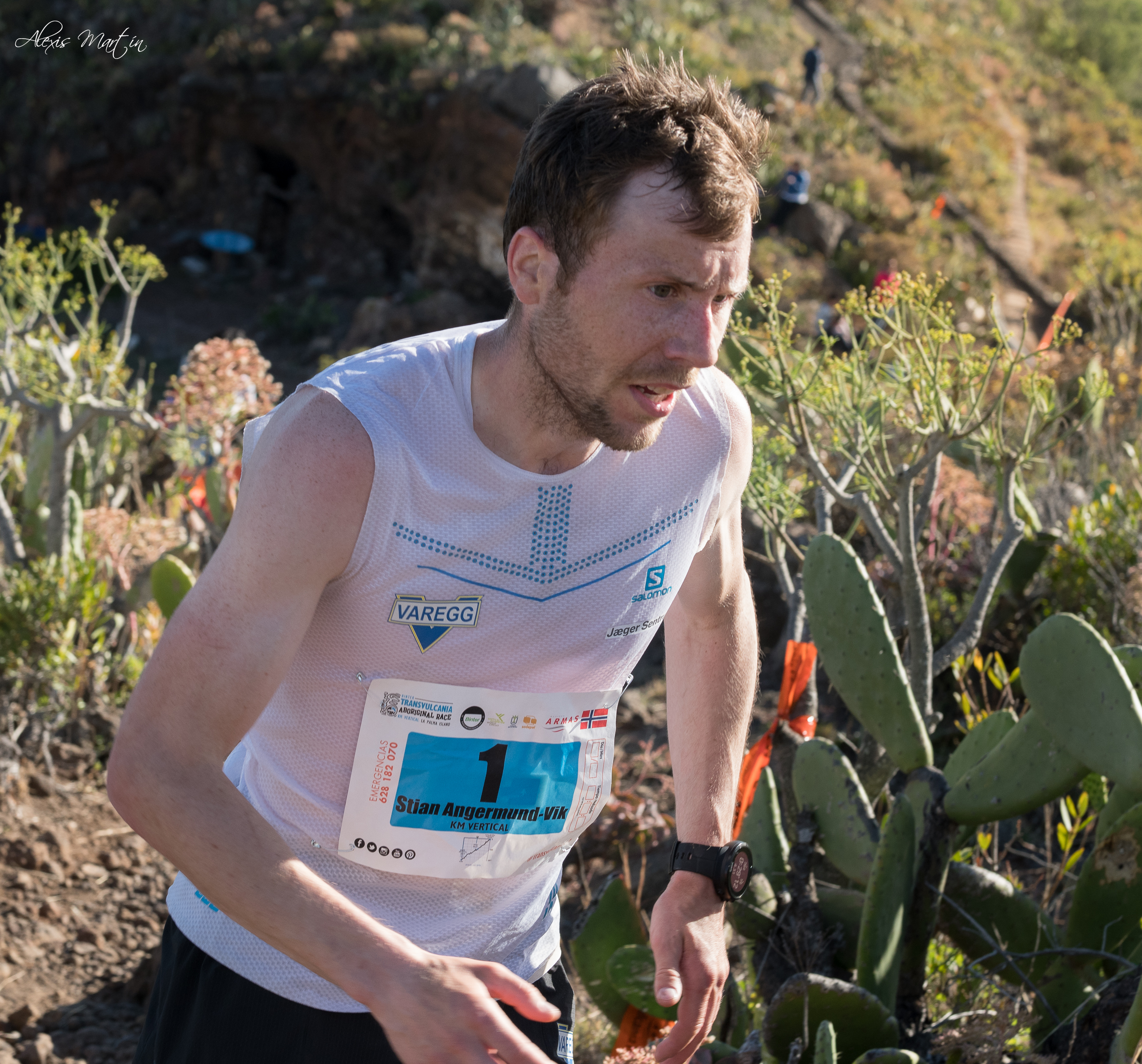
- Stian Angermund at 2017 Transvulcania KV.

Personal information
- Nationality: Norwegian
- Born: 27 August 1986 (age 39) Bergen
- Height: 170 cm (5 ft 7 in)

Sport
- Country: Norway
- Sport: Skyrunning / Mountain running / Trail Running
- Event(s): Mountain Running; Trailrunning; Vertical Kilometer; SkyMarathon
- Club: IL Varegg
- Coached by: Stian Angermund

Achievements and titles
- World finals: Golden World Championship; Golden Trail World Series; Skyrunning World Series; VK World Cup
Medal record
Winner 2022
Winner 2021 & Winner 2018
World Championships
Gold medal – first place	2016 Lleida	SkyMarathon
Gold medal – first place	2016 Lleida	Vertical Kilometer
European Championships
Silver medal – second place	2015 Chamonx	Vertical Kilometer
Bronze medal – third place	2016 Limone	Vertical Kilometer
WMRA World Championships
Gold medal – first place	2023 Innsbruc-Stubai	Short Race
Gold medal – first place	2021 Chiang Mai	Short Race

Stian Angermund (born 27 August 1986) is a Norwegian trail runner and mountain runner who won the 2021 Amazing Thailand World Mountain and Trail Running Championships at the 40 km distance.

He has also won the Salomon Golden Trail World Series in 2018 and 2021. Angermund holds the record of the Zegama-Aizkorri trail race. He won two gold medals at the 2016 Skyrunning World Championships held in Lleida, Spain, in the Vertical kilometer and SkyMarathon.

== Biography ==
World Champion in Short Trail Running, November 2022 at the 2021 World Mountain and trail running championships.

In 2017 he won the first edition of the Vertical Kilometer World Circuit. He also won two medals at the Skyrunning European Championships, always in vertical kilometer discipline.

In 2023 Angermund tested positive for the banned diuretic chlorthalidone after winning the Orsières-Champex-Chamonix event at the Ultra-Trail du Mont-Blanc. He denied intentional doping and suggested possible contamination, especially after it was revealed his sample was stored in an official’s home. In late 2024, he accepted a 16-month ban issued by the French Anti-Doping Agency starting from August 2023, allowing him to return to competition in December 2024.

== World Cup results ==
=== Race wins ===
Race of World Champion Trail Running 40KM (wins)
Race of Golden Trail World Series (wins)
Race of Skyrunner World Series (wins)
Race of Vertical Kilometer World Circuit (wins)

Season	Date	Race	Location	Discipline
2021	14 June	Olla Del Núria	Vall de Nuria, Spain	Golden Trail Series
2021	25 June	Mont Blanc Marathon	Chamonix, France	Golden Trail Series
2021	18 July	DoloMyths Run	Canazei, Italy	Golden Trail Series
2017	11 May	Transvulcania Vertical Kilometer	Tazacorte, Spain	Vertical Kilometer
2017	26 May	Zegama-Aizkorri Kilometro Vertical	Basque Country, Spain	Vertical Kilometer
2017	28 May	Zegama-Aizkorri Maratoia	Basque Country, Spain	SkyRace
2017	4 August	Blåmann Vertical	Tromsø, Norway	Vertical Kilometer
2017	15 September	Salomon Mamores VK	Glen Coe, United Kingdom	Vertical Kilometer
2017	16 September	Ring of Steall Skyrace	Glen Coe, United Kingdom	SkyRace
2015	31 July	Blåmann Vertical	Tromsø, Norway	Vertical Kilometer
2016	5 August	Blåmann Vertical	Tromsø, Norway	Vertical Kilometer

== Other results ==
- Hovlandsnuten Opp: 1st 2014
- Stoltzekleiven Opp: 1st 2014
- Nuten Opp: 1st 2014

== National titles ==
Mountain running

- Norwegian Mountain Running Championships (NM i motbakkeløp): 1st 2014 and 2016, 2nd 2013 and 2017
