= Borja Fernández (skater) =

Spanish professional vert skater

Borja Fernandez
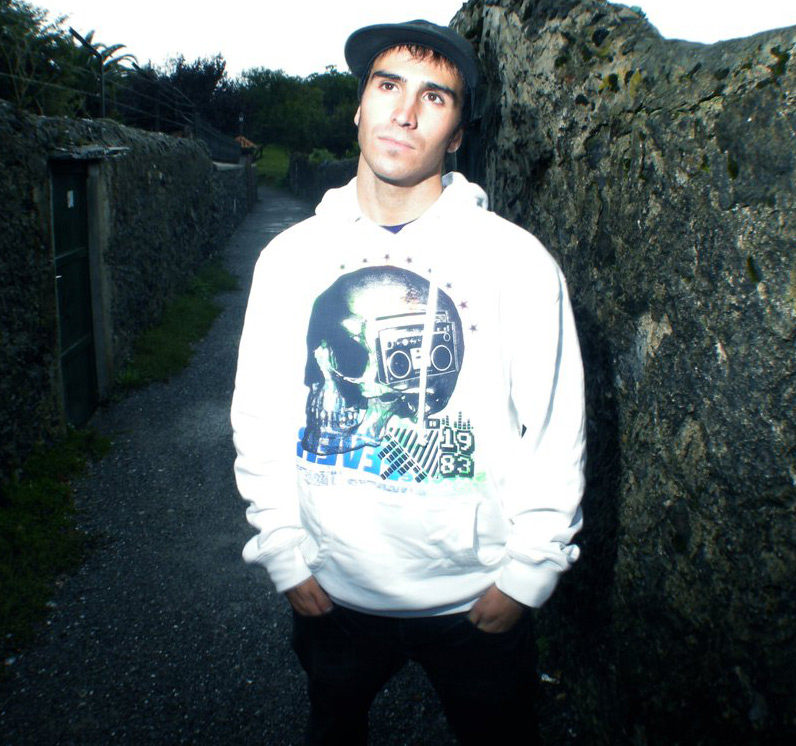

Personal information
- Nationality: Spanish
- Born: November 11, 1984 (age 41) Bilbao, Spain
- Height: 5 ft 5 in (1.65 m)
- Weight: 140 lb (64 kg)
Medal record
Competitions
Representing Spain
Bronze medal – third place	2007 Montpellier, France	Vert
Gold medal – first place	2004 Montpellier, France	Vert
Gold medal – first place	2002 European X Games	Vert

Borja Fernandez is a Spanish professional vert skater. Fernandez started skating when he was 11 in 1995 and turned professional in 2001. Fernandez has attended multiple vert competition in his career.

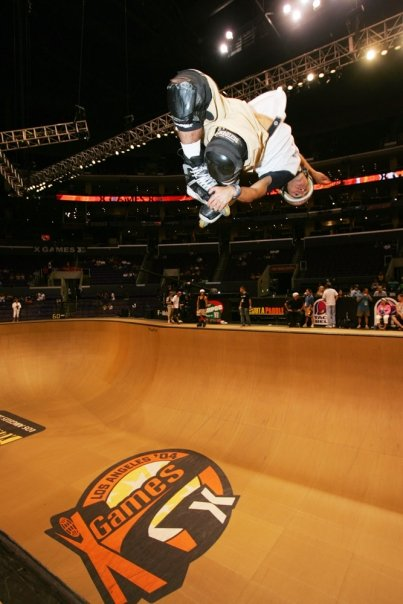
Borja Vert Skating

== Vert Competitions ==
- 2008 LG Action Sports World Championships, Seattle, WA - Vert: 4th
- 2007 Action Sports World Tour, San Diego, CA - Vert: 7th
- 2007 Nokia Fise, Montpellier, France - Vert: 3rd
- 2006 LG Action Sports World Tour, Paris, France - Vert: 9th
- 2006 LG Action Sports World Tour, Birmingham, England - Vert: 7th
- 2005 LG Action Sports Championship, Manchester, England - Vert: 11th
- 2005 LG Action Sports World Tour, Moscow, Russia - Vert: 9th
- 2005 LG Action Sports World Tour, Munich, Germany - Vert: 7th
- 2005 LG Action Sports World Tour, Pomona, CA - Vert: 7th
- 2004 FISE, Montpellier, France - Vert: 2nd
- 2002 ASA World Championships - Vert: 4th
- 2002 European X Games - Vert: Gold Medalist
- 2002 FISE, Montpellier, France - Vert: 3rd
- 2001 ASA World Amateur Championships - Vert: Champion
- 2001 European X Games - Vert: 5th, Vert Doubles: 3rd

Vert Tricks Fakie Flat 900, Fakie 1260
