= Hillary Gerardi =

American athlete

Hillary Geradi
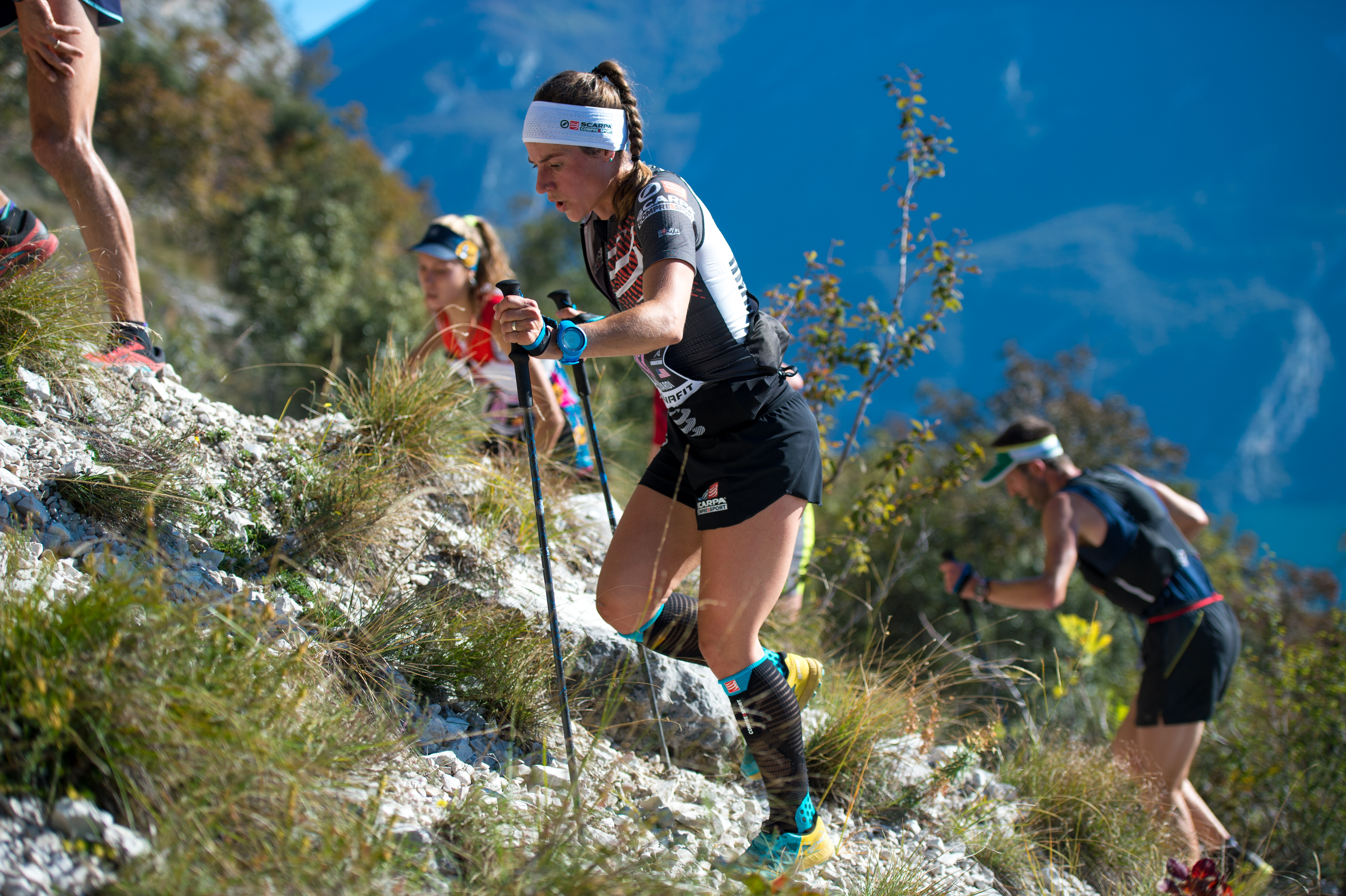

Personal information
- Nationality: United States
- Born: 13 October 1986 (age 39)

Sport
- Sport: Skyrunning, trail running

Hillary Gerardi is a French athlete following her naturalization in 2024, born in the United States 13 October 1986. A skyrunning specialist, she notably won the Tromsø Skyrace and the Kima Trophy in 2018. She holds the women's record for the round trip ascent of Mont Blanc from Chamonix in Haute-Savoie.

== Biography ==
At the beginning of April 2021, she achieved a first with Valentine Fabre, becoming the first female duo to ski mountaineer from Chamonix to Zermatt in one go via the Haute Route (108 km) in 26h 21mins.

On June 17, 2023, she set off at two o'clock in the morning from the church in Chamonix and began the ascent of Mont Blanc via the north ridge. She roped up with Valentine Fabre in the dangerous passages and reached the summit in 5 hours 16 minutes. She was then joined by the South African trail runner Meg Mackenzie who accompanied her during the descent to Chamonix. She reached her starting point after 7 hours 25 minutes of effort. She thus set a new round-trip record, beating by almost half an hour the previous women's record set by Emelie Forsberg in 2018.

== Medals ==
During the 2019 season she participated in the Skyrunner World Series circuit, she finished in 5th place in the first race, the Mt Awa Skyrace.

Position (overall)	Position (women)	Race	Distance	Date	Time
33	1st place, gold medalist(s)	France Tour des Cirques	120 km	21 August 2015	26 h 14 min 31 s
52	3rd place, bronze medalist(s)	Skyrhune	21 km	24 September 2016	2 h 32 min 46 s
31	2nd place, silver medalist(s)	Skyrace des Matheysins	27 km	8 May 2017	3 h 32 min 6 s
75	2nd place, silver medalist(s)	Dolomites SkyRace	22 km	22 July 2017	2 h 37 min 55 s
	2nd place, silver medalist(s)	Trentapassi Vertical Race	3,4 km	6 May 2018	
12	1st place, gold medalist(s)	Monte Rosa SkyMarathon	35 km	23 June 2018	5 h 51 min 32 s
52	2nd place, silver medalist(s)	DoloMyths Run	22 km	22 July 2018	2 h 32 min 9 s
9	1st place, gold medalist(s)	Tromsø Skyrace	57 km	4 August 2018	8 h 14 min 9 s
26	1st place, gold medalist(s)	Trophée Kima	52 km	26 August 2018	7 h 37 min 29 s
	5th	Mt Awa SkyRace	33 km	21 avril 2019	2 h 30 min 31 s
67	2nd place, silver medalist(s)	SkyRace des Matheysins	27 km	19 mai 2019	3 h 03 min 23 s
14	3rd place, bronze medalist(s)	Tromsø Skyrace	55 km	3 août 2019	8 h 25 min 57 s
26	2nd place, silver medalist(s)	Matterhorn Ultraks Extreme	25 km	23 août 2019	4 h 14 min 48 s
16	3rd place, bronze medalist(s)	Matterhorn Ultraks Vertical	2,3 km	23 août 2019	26 min 23 s
13	2nd place, silver medalist(s)	Matterhorn Ultraks Extreme	25 km	21 août 2020	4 h 25 min 23 s
9	1st place, gold medalist(s)	AMA VK2	11 km	19 juin 2021	1 h 58 min 57 s
20	1st place, gold medalist(s)	90 km du Mont-Blanc	85 km	2 juillet 2021	11 h 54 min 11 s
16	2nd place, silver medalist(s)	Matterhorn Ultraks Extreme	25 km	20 août 2021	4 h 10 min 54 s
26	1st place, gold medalist(s)	Grigne SkyMarathon	23 km	19 septembre 2021	2 h 24 min 28 s
21	2nd place, silver medalist(s)	Monte Rosa SkyMarathon	35 km	25 juin 2022	6 h 52 min 42 s
37	3rd place, bronze medalist(s)	Giir di Mont	32 km	31 juillet 2022	4 h 6 min 6 s
19	1st place, gold medalist(s)	Trophée Kima	52 km	28 août 2022	7 h 30 min 38 s
58	3rd place, bronze medalist(s)	Skyrace des Matheysins	25,3 km	14 mai 2023	3 h 2 min 15 s
26	1st place, gold medalist(s)	Grigne SkyMarathon	43 km	17 septembre 2023	6 h 12 min 5 s
19	2nd place, silver medalist(s)	Monte Zerbion Vertical	9,5 km	18 mai 2024	1 h 40 min 19 s
20	1st place, gold medalist(s)	Hochkönig SkyRace	31,6 km	1^{er} juin 2024	4 h 7 min 20 s
16	2nd place, silver medalist(s)	Monte Rosa SkyMarathon	35 km	16 juin 2024	6 h 37 min 9 s
26	3rd place, bronze medalist(s)	Cordillera Blanca Skyrace	23 km	7 juillet 2024	2 h 43 min 11 s
30	1st place, gold medalist(s)	Trophée Kima	52 km	24 août 2024	7 h 32 min 58 s
21	1st place, gold medalist(s)	Maga SkyMarathon	39 km	22 septembre 2024	5 h 31 min 56 s
23	2nd place, silver medalist(s)	Kilomètre vertical du Mont-Blanc	3,8 km	27 juin 2025	44 min 41 s
25	1st place, gold medalist(s)	Championnats de France de trail long	72,45 km	12 juillet 2025	9 h 25 min 27 s
36	1st place, gold medalist(s)	Trophée Kima	52 km	22 août 2026	7 h 25 min 54 s
