= Lucy Wambui Murigi =

Kenyan mountain runner

Lucy Wambūi Mūrìgì
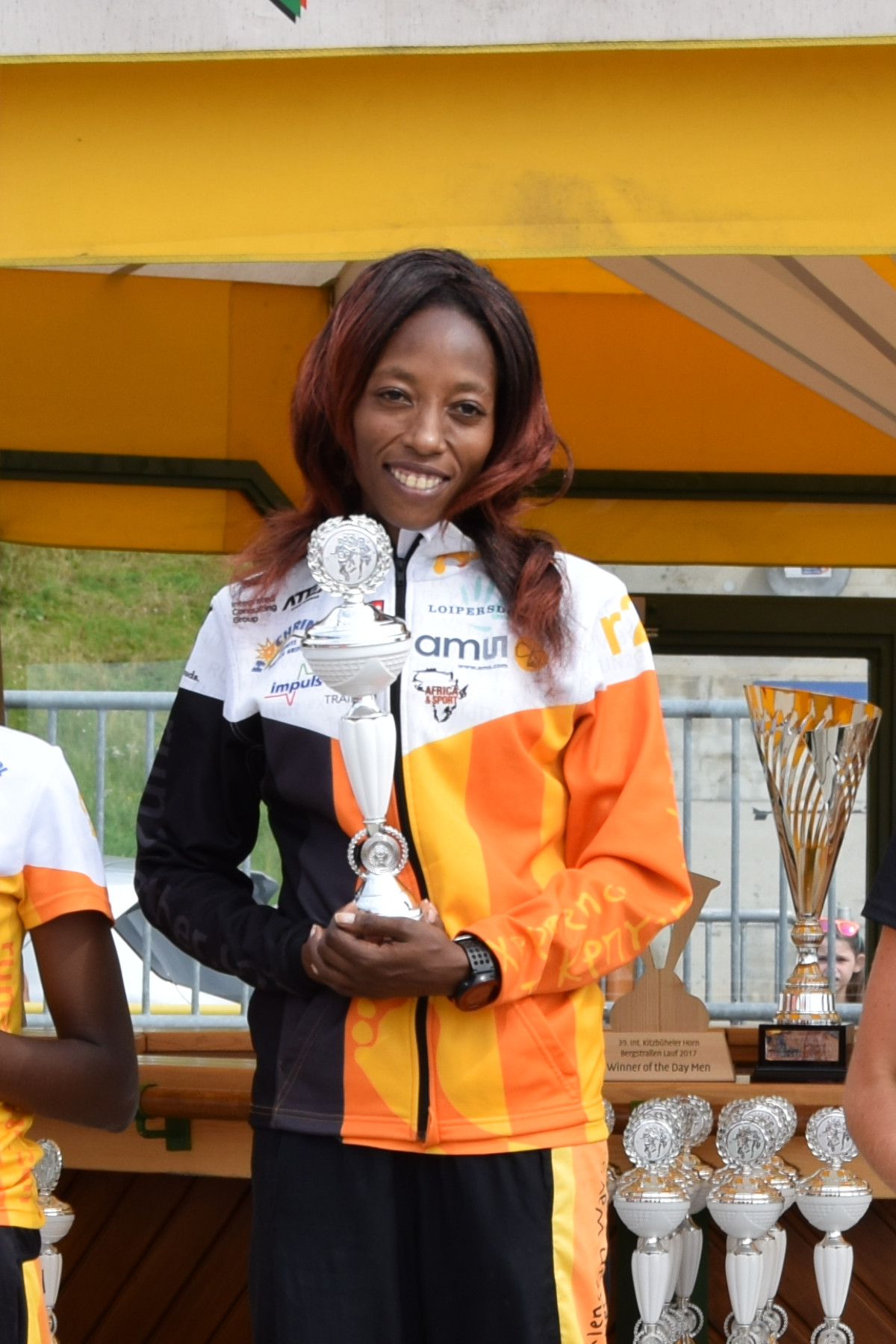

Personal information
- Full name: Lucy Wambūi Mūrìgì
- Nationality: Kenyan
- Born: 7 July 1985 (age 40)

Sport
- Country: Kenya
- Sport: Mountain running
Medal record
Event	1st	2nd	3rd
World Championships Individual	1	1	0
Total	1	1	0

Lucy Wambūi Mūrìgì (born 7 July 1985) is a female Kenyan mountain runner who won the 2017 World Mountain Running Championships. She also won the 2018 World Mountain Running Championships held in Andorra, putting Maude Mathys of Switzerland into second place with her fellow Kenyan Viola Jelegat in third place.
