= Nathan Beard =

American politician

Member of the Missouri House of Representatives from the 52nd district
- In office January 7, 2015 – January 9, 2019
- Preceded by: Stanley Cox
- Succeeded by: Bradley Pollitt

Personal details
- Born: March 9, 1978 (age 48) Switzerland
- Party: Republican

Nathan Beard (born March 9, 1978) is an American politician who served in the Missouri House of Representatives from the 52nd district from 2015 to 2019.
