= Maude Mathys =

Swiss ski mountaineer and trail runner

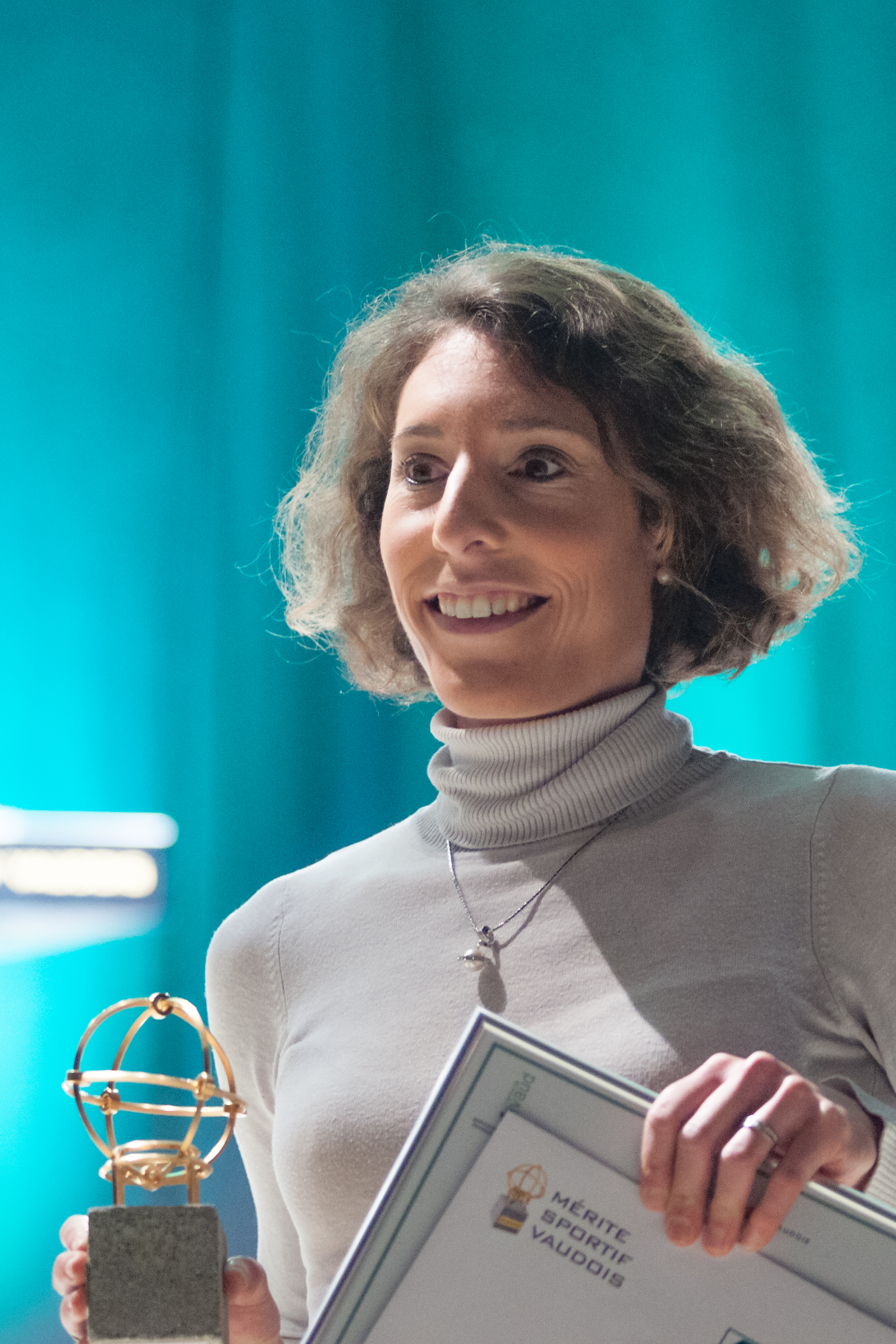

Personal information
- Born: 14 January 1987 (age 39)

Sport
- Sport: Skiing
Medal record
Ski mountaineering
Bronze medal – third place	2012 European Championship	Team

Maude Mathys, née Küng (born 14 January 1987), from Ollon is a Swiss ski mountaineer and trail runner. She is currently member of the SAC-CAS Swiss Team 2. She is also competing in ultramarathon events.

In 2015 Mathys was reprimanded for an anti-doping rule violation for using clomiphene, a fertility drug which features on the World Anti-Doping Agency Prohibited List under section S4: Hormone and Metabolic Modulators. Mathys was let off with a warning as the drug was being taken in the hope of getting pregnant.

Kenyan Lucy Wambui Murigi won the 2018 World Mountain Running Championships held in Andorra, putting Mathys into second place with Kenyan Viola Jelegat in third place.

== Selected results ==
- 2012:
  - 3rd, European Championship, team, together with Émilie Gex-Fabry
  - 4th, European Championship, vertical race
  - 1st, 2017 European Mountain Running Championships.
