= Matterhorn Ultraks =

The Matterhorn Ultraks is an international skyrunning competition held for the first time in 1982. It runs every year in Zermatt (Switzerland) in August, race valid for the Skyrunner World Series till 2010.

== Winners ==
Year	Distance	Men's winner	Time	Women's winner	Time
1982		(Switzerland) Peter Haid		(Switzerland) Katharina Beck	
1983		(Switzerland) Peter Haid		(Switzerland) Martine Oppliger	
1984		(Switzerland) Stephan Gmünder		(Germany) Olivia Grüner	
1985		(United Kingdom) Robin Bryson		(Germany) Olivia Grüner	
1986		(United Kingdom) Mike Short		(Germany) Elisabeth Franzis	
1987		(United Kingdom) Mike Short		(Switzerland) Fabiola Rueda	
1988		(Germany) Wolfgang Münzel		(United Kingdom) Sally Goldsmith	
1989		(Colombia) Jairo Correa		(United Kingdom) Sally Goldsmith	
1990		(Colombia) Jairo Correa		(United Kingdom) Sally Goldsmith	
1991					
1992		(Switzerland) Norbert Moulin		(Switzerland) Fabiola Rueda Oppliger	
1993		(Switzerland) Woody Schoch		(Australia) Louise Fairfax	
1994		(Colombia) José Guerrero		(Switzerland) Carolina Reiber	
1995		(Colombia) German Fernandez		(Switzerland) Isabella Moretti	
1996		(Colombia) Francisco Sánchez		(Switzerland) Isabella Moretti	
1997		(Ethiopia) Haile Koricho		(United Kingdom) Anne Buckley	
1998		(United Kingdom) Martin Cox		(United Kingdom) Heather Heasman	
1999		(New Zealand) Jonathan Wyatt		(Ethiopia) Tamrat Gete	
2000		(United Kingdom) Billy Burns	1:04:36.9	(United Kingdom) Angela Mudge	1:17:20.3
2001		(New Zealand) Jonathan Wyatt	1:02:41.6	(Poland) Izabela Zatorska	1:16:44.3
2002		(New Zealand) Jonathan Wyatt	1:02:27,6	(New Zealand) Melissa Moon	1:18:07,2
2003		(New Zealand) Jonathan Wyatt	1:01:59,2	(Poland) Izabela Zatorska	1:15:52,7
2004		(United Kingdom) Billy Burns	1:05:31,5	(Switzerland) Daniela Gassmann	1:18:35,8
2005		(Switzerland) Sébastien Epiney	1:07:40,4	(Switzerland) Angéline Flückiger-Joly	1:18:27,7
2006		(Australia) Ben Du Bois	57:17,7	(Czech Republic) Anna Pichrtová	1:05:21,6
2007		(Germany) Timo Zeiler	57:28,1	(Czech Republic) Anna Pichrtová	1:05:41,4
2008		(Germany) Timo Zeiler	55:33,8	(Switzerland) Daniela Gassmann	1:06:44,5
2009		(Eritrea) Michael Mehari	59:50,0	(Switzerland) Daniela Gassmann	1:09:23,1
2010		(United States) Joseph Gray	57:35,7	(Switzerland) Daniela Gassmann Bahr	1:07:53,2
2011		(Eritrea) Yohannes Tesfay	58:51.0	(United Kingdom) Sarah Tunstall	1:11.29,1
2012		(Eritrea) Oquibit Berhane	57:41.7	(Switzerland) Daniela Gassmann Bahr	1:10.17,8
2013	46 K	(Spain) Kilian Jornet	4:43.05,9	(Sweden) Emelie Forsberg	5:41.16,3
2013	30 K	(Switzerland) Stephan Wenk	2:45.19,5	(United Kingdom) Tessa Hill	3:32.52,8
2013	16 K	(Eritrea) Oquibit Berhane	1:25.50,6	(France) Laetitia Roux	1:44.07,3
2014	46 K	(Morocco) Zaid Ait Malek	4:45.01,2	(United States) Stevie Kremer	5:18.43,6
2014	30 K	(France) Benjamin Petitjean	2:52.33,9	(France) Mey Romy	3:37.40,6
2014	16 K	(Switzerland) Rémi Bonnet	1:25.22,3	(Switzerland) Claudia Stettler	1:48.56,1
2015	46 K	(Switzerland) Martin Anthamatten	4:45:11.53	(Italy) Elisa Desco	5:23:46.29
2015	30 K	(Australia) Daniel Green	2:53:04.50	(Switzerland) Bettina Gruber	3:22:58.31
2015	16 K	(France) Paul Mathou	1:27:57.22	(Denmark) Katrine Villumsen	1:47:38.56
2016	46 K	(Switzerland) Marc Lauenstein	4:47:01.05	(United States) Megan Kimmel	5:23:15.15
2016	30 K	(Australia) Etienne Rodriguez	3:04:38.91	(New Zealand) Ruth Croft	3:22:30.84
2016	16 K	(Switzerland) Alexandre Jodidio	1:23:12.41	(Denmark) Katrine Villumsen	1:39:27.06
2017	46 K	(Italy) Marco De Gasperi	4:42:32	(Netherlands) Ragna Debats	5:52:06
2017	30 K	(Switzerland) Stephan Wenk	2:47:07	(New Zealand) Ruth Croft	3:15:14
2017	16 K	(Portugal) Cesar Costa	1:37:05	(Switzerland) Victoria Kreuzer	1:55:23

== See also ==
- Skyrunner World Series
