= Lausanne Marathon =

Annual race in Switzerland held since 1993

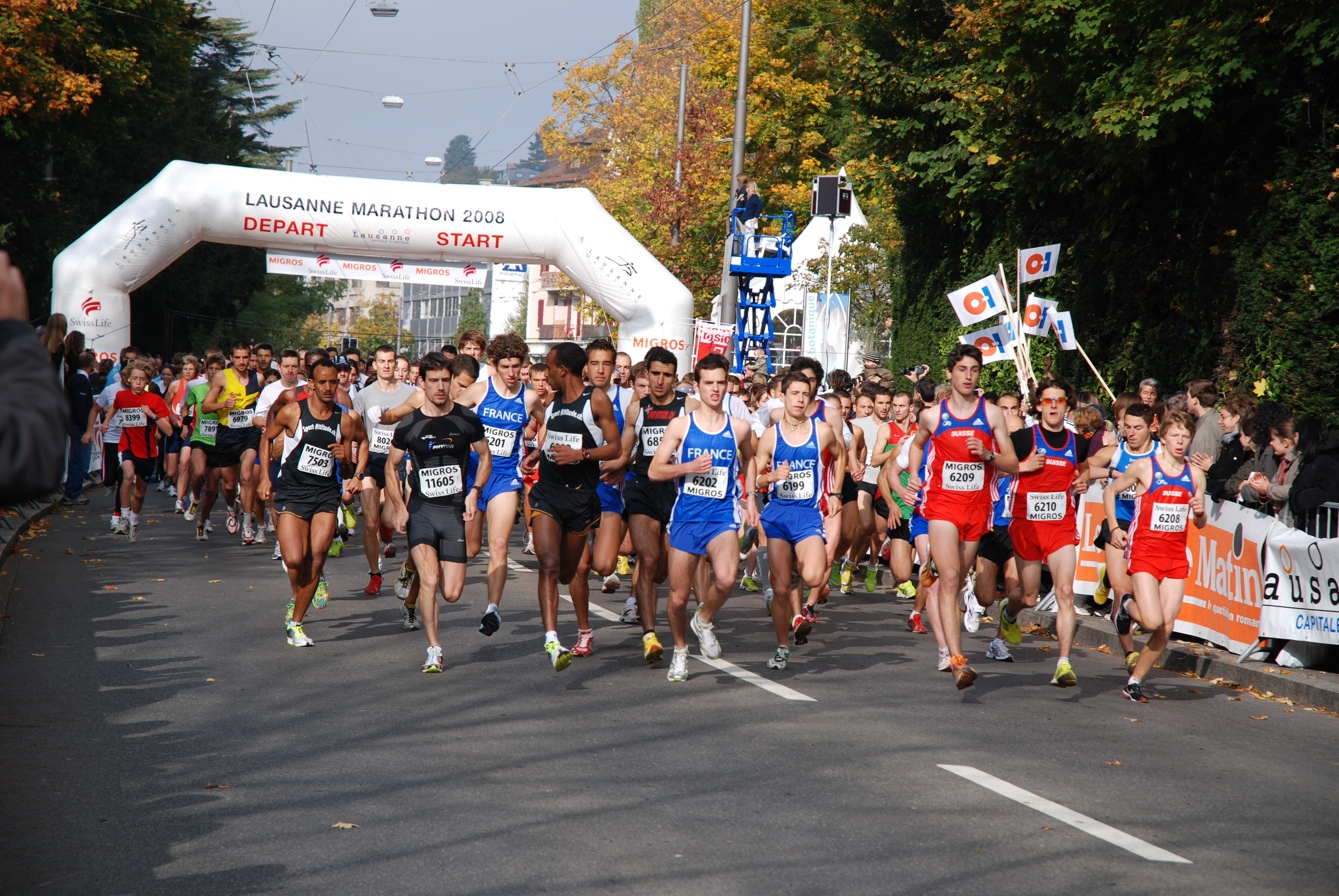
- The start of the Lausanne Marathon in 2008
- Date: October
- Location: Lausanne, Switzerland
- Event type: Road
- Distance: Marathon
- Primary sponsor: Retraites populaires, Groupe mutuel
- Established: 1993 (33 years ago)
- Course records: Men's: 2:10:05 (2003) (Ethiopia) Tesfaye Eticha; Women's: 2:29:03 (2002) (Kenya) Tegla Loroupe
- Website: Lausanne Marathon
- Participants: 1,207 (2019); 1,356 (2018)

The Lausanne Marathon is an annual marathon race held in the Swiss city of Lausanne since 1993. The road race generally takes place in October, while the 20 km of Lausanne takes place in April. A half marathon and multiple 10-kilometre (6.2 mi) races (run, walk, and Nordic walk) are also held.

The Lausanne Marathon is one of the largest annual sporting events of the Canton de Vaud, and attracts up to 2,500 tourists each year.

== History ==
The first edition was held in 1993, with the inauguration of the Olympic Museum.

In 2005, Ethiopia's Tesfaye Eticha won the men's competition for a record seventh time.

In 2009, a record 10,658 runners participated.

The 2020 edition of the race was cancelled, three days before its scheduled date, due to a spike of coronavirus cases during the second wave of the coronavirus pandemic, with all registrants given the option of obtaining a refund.

== Course ==
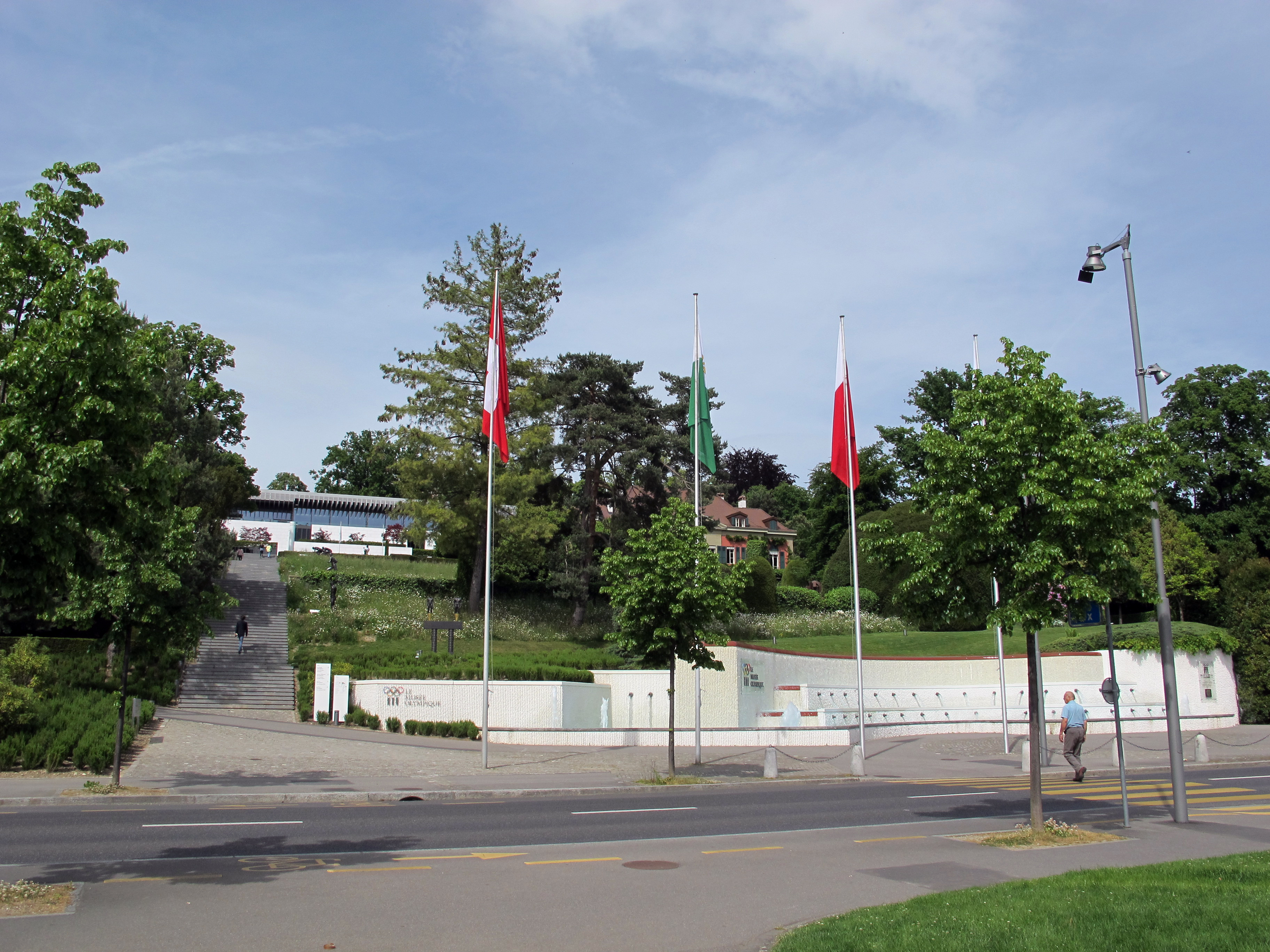
Finish location: In front of the fountain (foreground right) of the Olympic Museum in Ouchy

The race starts in Lausanne, Place de Milan (next to the Parc de Milan), and then follows the road along the Lake Léman until La Tour-de-Peilz, before returning to Lausanne via the same route. The finish is located in front of the Olympic Museum fountain.

The half-marathon (21 km) starts from La Tour-de-Peilz (since 2000) and ends in Lausanne.

== Winners ==
Key: Course record (in bold)

Ed.	Date	Male Winner	Time	Female Winner	Time	Rf.
1	1993.06.26	Nikolay Tabak (UKR)	2:19:51	Franziska Rochat-Moser (SUI)	2:42:06	
2	1994.10.16	Nada Saktay (TAN)	2:16:10	Nataliya Galushko (BLR)	2:41:38	
3	1995.10.15	Jacob Ngunzu (KEN)	2:18:37	Valentina Enachi (MDA)	2:33:35	
4	1996.10.13	Becho Tadesse (ETH)	2:15:40	Fabiola Oppliger (SUI)	2:42:31	
5	1997.10.19	Becho Tadesse (ETH)	2:16:04	Kore Alemu (ETH)	2:42:39	
6	1998.10.18	Tesfaye Eticha (ETH)	2:16:34	Kore Alemu (ETH)	2:38:08	
7	1999.10.24	Tesfaye Eticha (ETH)	2:12:48	Irina Kazakova (FRA)	2:37:35	
8	2000.10.22	Tesfaye Eticha (ETH)	2:16:25	Irina Kazakova (FRA)	2:38:42	
9	2001.10.21	Tesfaye Eticha (ETH)	2:12:38.6	Valentina Enachi (MDA)	2:39:42.7	
10	2002.10.20	Tesfaye Eticha (ETH)	2:11:22.8	Tegla Loroupe (KEN)	**2:29:03.2**	
11	2003.10.26	Tesfaye Eticha (ETH)	**2:10:04.7**	Emebet Abossa (ETH)	2:34:39.7	
12	2004.10.24	David Kipkorir (KEN)	2:13:37.8	Tsige Worku (ETH)	2:37:25.3	
13	2005.10.23	Tesfaye Eticha (ETH)	2:12:41.0	Sandra Annen-Lamard (SUI)	3:01:02.8	
14	2006.10.22	Sammy Rotich (KEN)	2:14:39.0	Meseret Koru (ETH)	2:39:42.8	
15	2007.10.21	William Kipchumba (KEN)	2:12:17.9	Zhanna Malkova (RUS)	2:47:10.8	
16	2008.10.26	Berhe Zeremariam (ERI)	2:16:04.9	Pauline Atondoyang (KEN)	2:46:22.6	
17	2009.10.25	Urguessa Weyessa (ETH)	2:21:00.2	Joanna Chmiel (POL)	2:54:59.0	
18	2010.10.31	Hailu Begashaw (ETH)	2:20:02.4	Magali Di Marco (SUI)	2:54:10.0	
19	2011.10.30	Hamed Mehamednor (ERI)	2:19:37	Imaculate Chemutai (UGA)	2:47:36	
20	2012.10.28	Bartosz Olszewski (POL)	2:32:07	Laura Hrebec (SUI)	2:41:37	
21	2013.10.27	Maciej Miereczko (POL)	2:29:02	Emma Pooley (GBR)	2:44:29	
22	2014.10.26	Jacob Yator (KEN)	2:18:38	Naomy Chebonai (KEN)	2:51:54	
23	2015.10.25	Yeshigeta Tamiru (ETH)	2:17:08	Helen Bekele (ETH)	2:31:24	
24	2016.10.30	Youssef Sbaai (MAR)	2:17:06	Alemitu Bekele (BEL)	2:42:41	
25	2017.10.22	Fikru Dadi (ETH)	2:22:58	Laura Hrebec (SUI)	2:40:28	
26	2018.10.28	Alaa Hrioued (MAR)	2:22:16	Aline Camboulives (FRA)	2:43:14	
27	2019.10.27	Ayele Woldesemayat (ETH)	2:22:11	Simone Troxler (SUI)	2:42:30	
	2020	cancelled due to coronavirus pandemic				
