= 20 km of Lausanne =

Road running event in Lausanne, Switzerland

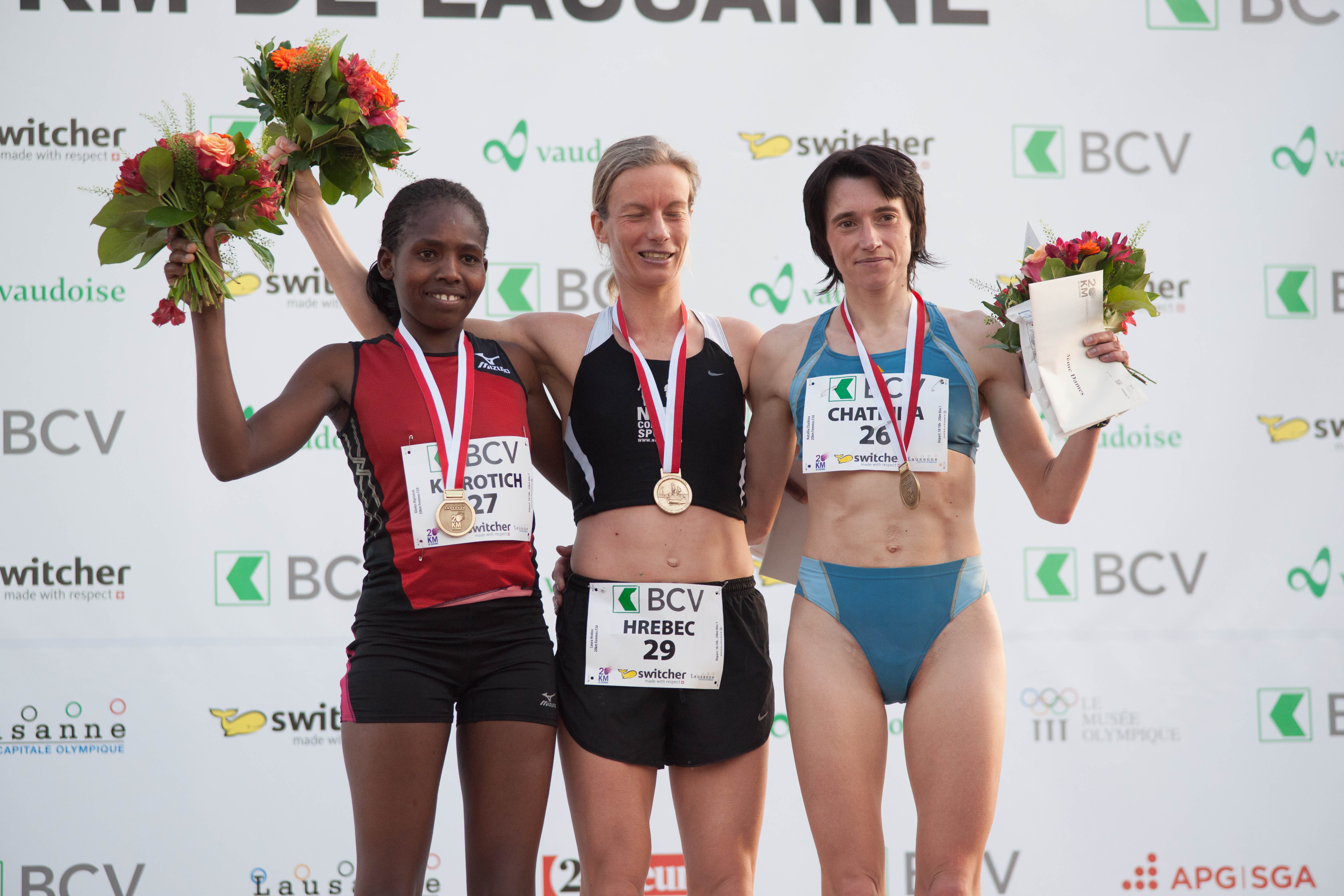
Women's podium of the 20 km of Lausanne in 2012.

The 20 km of Lausanne (French 20 km de Lausanne) is an annual road running event in Lausanne (Switzerland). It includes races on 20, 10, 4 and 2 kilometres.

The 20 km of Lausanne takes place in spring (April) and the Marathon of Lausanne takes place in autumn (October).

== Route ==
The start of the race is located in Vidy and the finish is in the Stade Pierre de Coubertin (close to the start).
