= Zermatt Marathon =

Annual alpine mountain running event in Zermatt, Switzerland

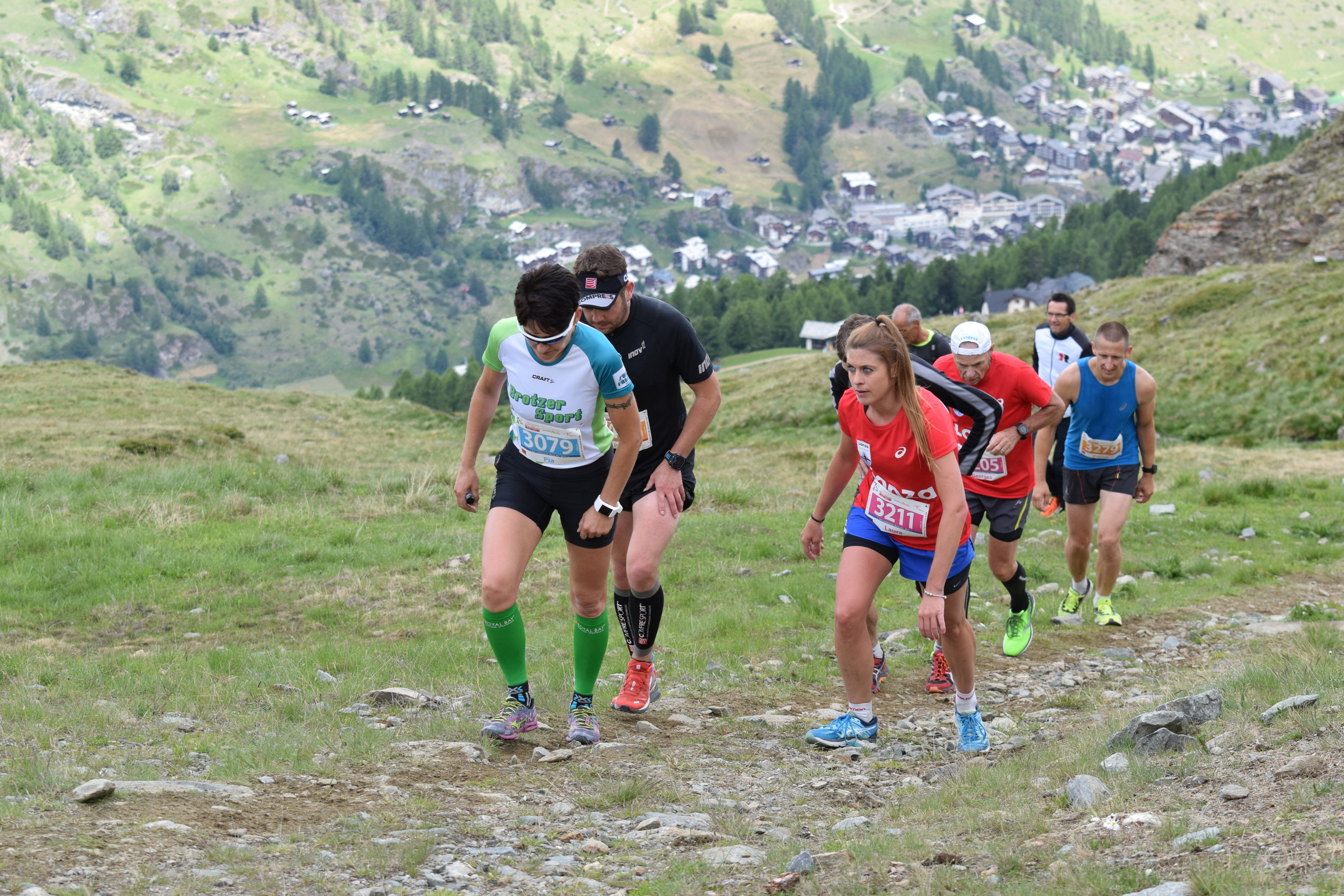
- Marathon in 2017
- Date: July
- Location: (Switzerland) Zermatt
- Event type: Mountain marathon
- Distance: 42.195 km
- Established: 2002
- Website: Zermatt marathon

The Zermatt Marathon is an annual marathon distance (42.195 km) alpine mountain running event held in Zermatt, Switzerland.

== Winners ==
Year	Men			Women		
Year	Runner	Nation	Time	Runner	Nation	Time
2021	Benedikt Hoffmann -2-	Germany	3:02.24.8	Nienke Brinkman	Netherlands	3:19.42.8
2020	Did not held					
2019	Benedikt Hoffmann	Germany	3:04:59.0	Aline Camboulives	France -4-	3:50:00.2
2018	Robbie Simpson	United Kingdom	3:00:39.8	Ivana Iozzia	Italy -2-	3:36:20.6
2017	Eric Blake	United States	3:03:36.3	Ivana Iozzia	Italy	3:39:55.3
2016	Patrick Wieser	Switzerland -3-	3:06:58.4	Aline Camboulives	France -3-	3:35:44.5
2015	Tommaso Vaccina	Italy	3:01:51.5	Martina Strähl	Switzerland	3:21:38.4
2014	Paul Maticha Michieka	Kenya -3-	2:55:04.8	Aline Camboulives	France -2-	3:29:36.3
2013	Paul Maticha Michieka	Kenya -2-	3:05:25.0	Aline Camboulives	France	3:31:26.9
2012	Paul Maticha Michieka	Kenya	2:59:54.9	Daniela Gassmann-Bahr	Switzerland -2-	3:29:13.1
2011	Patrick Wieser	Switzerland -2-	3:09:40.6	Daniela Gassmann-Bahr	Switzerland	3:32:12.2
2010	Patrick Wieser	Switzerland	3:09:34.5	Claudia Landolt	Switzerland -2-	3:44:05.2
2009	Jonathan Wyatt	New Zealand	2:57:47.3	Claudia Landolt	Switzerland	3:43:30.6
2008	Gerd Frick	Italy	3:11:22.4	Elizabeth Hawker	United Kingdom -3-	3:45:19.6
2007	Helmut Schießl	Germany	3:06:31.8	Elizabeth Hawker	United Kingdom -2-	3:32:48.7
2006	Billy Burns	United Kingdom -3-	3:11:14.5	Elizabeth Hawker	United Kingdom	3:36:34.7
2005	Billy Burns	United Kingdom -2-	3:04:19.8	Sylke Schmitz	Germany	3:54:26.4
2004	Jean-Yves Rey	Switzerland	3:09:44.7	Nathalie Etzensperger	Switzerland	3:46:28.8
2003	Billy Burns	United Kingdom	3:17:08.1	Carolina Reiber	Switzerland -2-	3:45:24.5
2002	Stefan Tassani-Prell	Germany	3:34:29.5	Carolina Reiber	Switzerland	4:02:45.0

== See also ==
- Marathon du Mont Blanc
