= Lausanne-Sports Aviron =

Swiss rowing club

Lausanne-Sports Aviron (lit. 'Lausanne-Sports Rowing') is a Swiss rowing club in Vidy, Lausanne. The club was founded on 20 August 1916.

The club's training methods, named the Bertsch method (French: méthode Bertsch) after its head coach, are focused on efficiency and quantifiability. Lausanne-Sports Aviron is one of the most successful rowing clubs in Switzerland. It won the national championship eight years in a row from 2007 to 2014 and regularly sends athletes to the Swiss national team and the Olympics. The club colours are blue and white.
