= Stade Pierre de Coubertin =

The Stade Pierre de Coubertin may refer to any of the following venues named after French sports executive Pierre de Coubertin:

- Stade Pierre de Coubertin (Paris)
- Stade Pierre de Coubertin (Cannes)
- Stade Pierre de Coubertin (Lausanne)
