= Hermann Achmüller =

Italian mountain runner (born 1971)

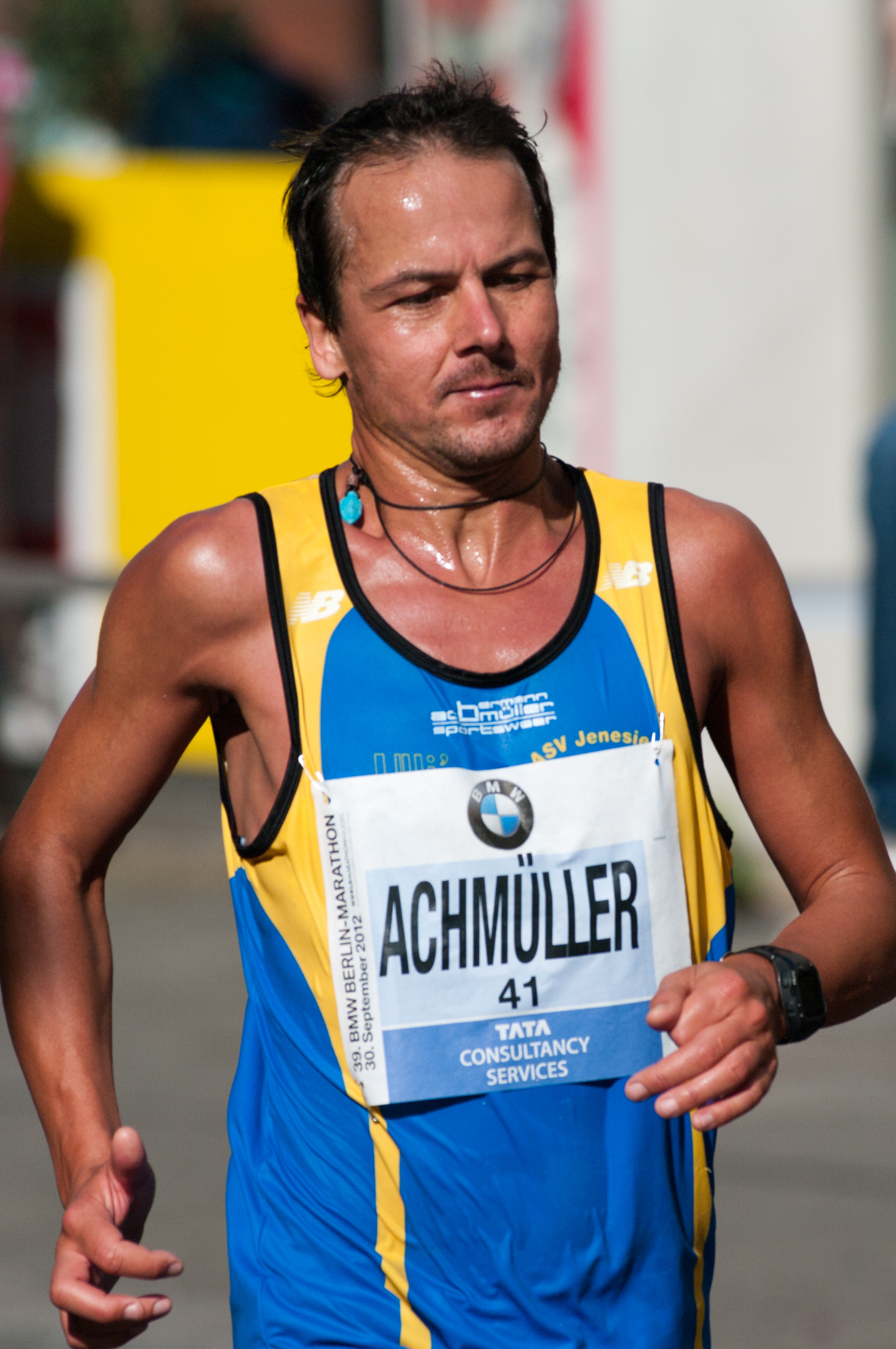

Personal information
- Nationality: Italian
- Born: 17 February 1971 (age 55) Bruneck, Italy

Sport
- Country: Italy
- Sport: Mountain running

Achievements and titles
- Personal bests: Half marathon: 1:05:39 (2004); Marathon: 2:18:56 (2005)
Medal record
Mountain running
World LD Championships
Silver medal – second place	2007 Bernese Oberland	Individual

Hermann Achmüller (born 17 February 1971) is an Italian male mountain runner, who won a medal at the World Long Distance Mountain Running Championships (2007).

He won Vienna City Marathon in 2006 and Jungfrau Marathon in 2008.
