= Gerd Frick =

Italian mountain runner

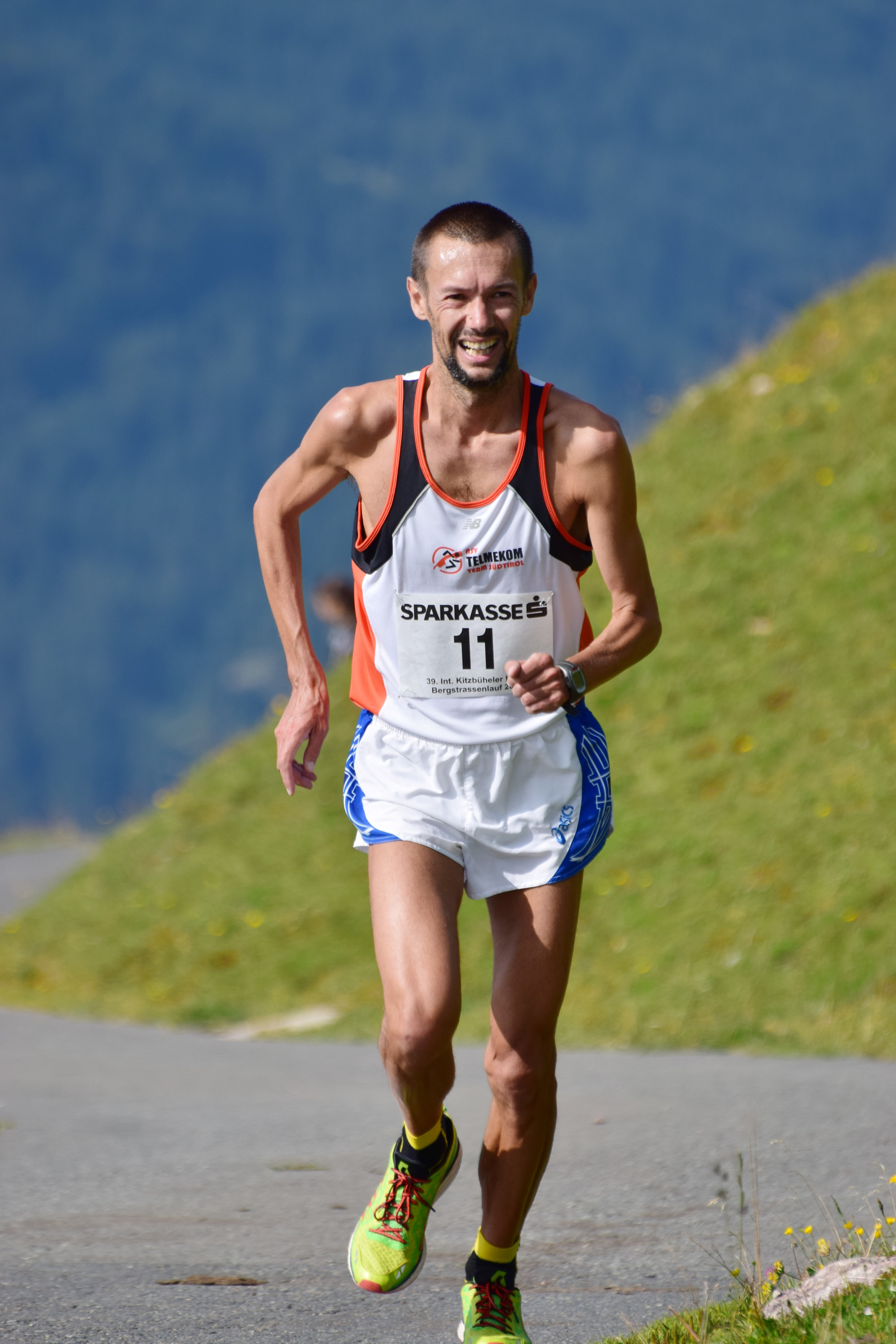

Personal information
- Nationality: Italian
- Born: 24 July 1974 (age 51) Merano, Italy

Sport
- Country: Italy
- Sport: Mountain running
- Club: Telmekom Team

Achievements and titles
- Personal bests: Half marathon: 1:06:37 (2004); Marathon: 2:23:18 (2009)
Medal record
Mountain running
World LD Championships
Bronze medal – third place	2007 Bernese Oberland	Individual

Gerd Frick (born 24 July 1974) is an Italian male mountain runner, who won a bronze medal at the World Long Distance Mountain Running Championships (2007) and won the Zermatt marathon in 2008.
