= Geneva Marathon =

Annual running race in Switzerland held since 2005

- Geneva Marathon logo
- Date: Early May
- Location: Geneva, Switzerland
- Event type: Road
- Distance: Marathon, Half marathon, 10K run
- Primary sponsor: Generali
- Beneficiary: UNICEF
- Established: 2005 (21 years ago)
- Course records: Men's: 2:06:59 (2021) (Bahrain) Shumi Dechasa; Women's: 2:24:19 (2021) (Kenya) Maureen Chepkemoi
- Website: Geneva Marathon
- Participants: 1,928 finishers (2023); 1,880 (2019)

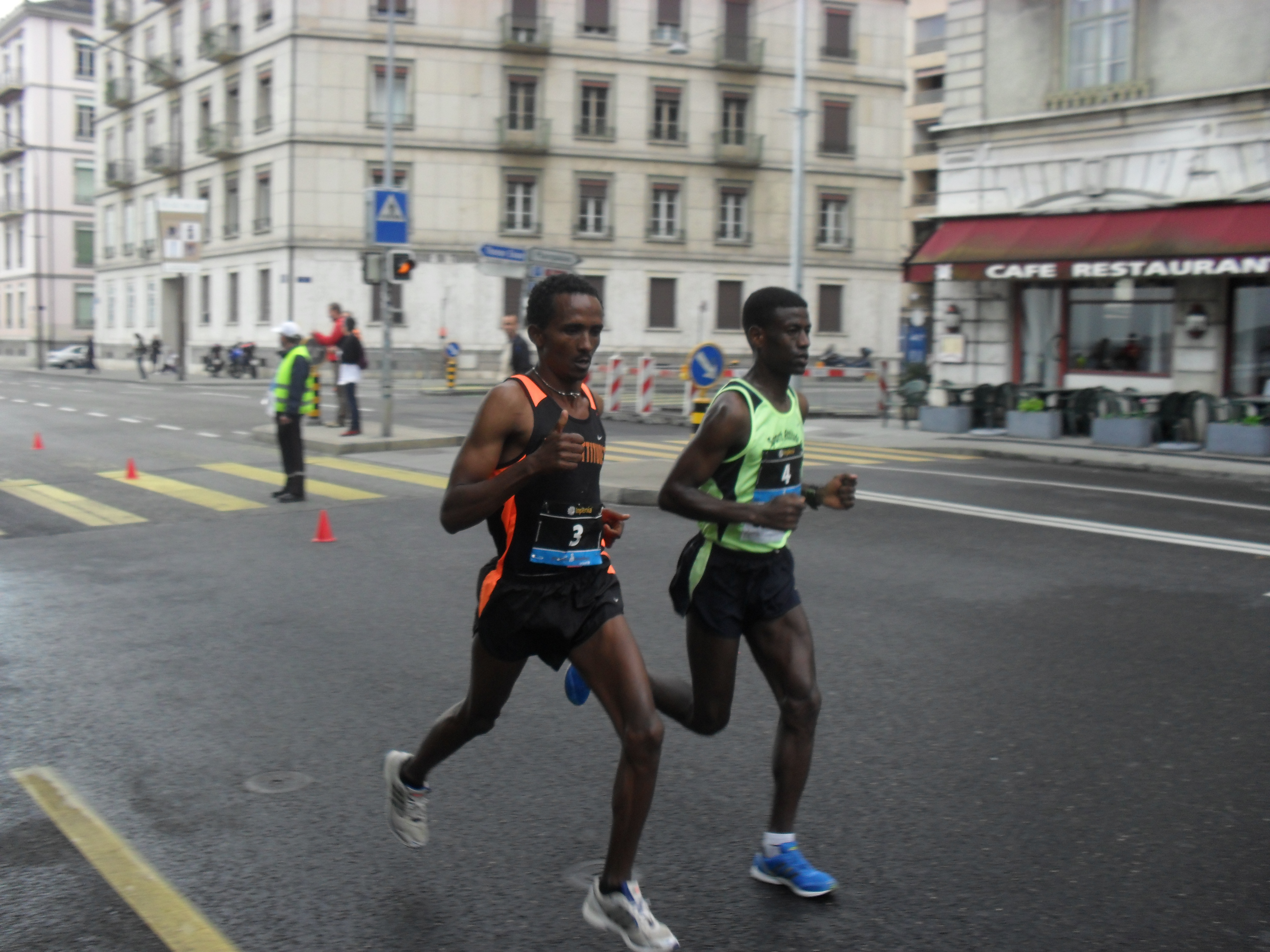
Teshomi Temerate and Germa Tsiga in 2010.

The Harmony Geneva Marathon for UNICEF is an annual marathon running event held in Geneva, Switzerland. It draws about 9,100 participants every May. Apart from the marathon, there is also a half marathon, a Relay Marathon, a 20 km Handbike and wheelchair race, a 10 km race held on the same day, and races exclusively for women (5 km) and children (1 to 5 km) held the day before. A time limit of six hours and a half applies to the main event.

The 2020 edition of the race was cancelled due to the coronavirus pandemic, with all registrants given the option of transferring their entry to 2021 or obtaining a partial refund.

== Winners ==
Key: Course record

Ed.	Year	Men's winner	Time	Women's winner	Time	Rf.
1	2005	Tesfaye Eticha (ETH)	2:15:29	Kenina Chawla (ETH)	2:43:53	
2	2006	Tesfaye Eticha (ETH)	2:15:31	Joanna Chmiel (POL)	2:45:07	
3	2007	Tesfaye Eticha (ETH)	2:18:36	Elfenesh Melaku (ETH)	2:43:57	
4	2008	Tesfaye Eticha (ETH)	2:14:23	Addis Gezahegne (ETH)	2:46:57	
5	2009	Germa Tsige (ETH)	2:19:49	Reulen Stijntje (SUI)	2:52:47	
6	2010	Teshomi Temerate (ETH)	2:20:30	Laura Hrebec (SUI)	2:44:32	
7	2011	Hailu Begashaw (ETH)	2:17:45.7	Pascale Prevel (BEL)	3:07:49.5	
8	2012	Tewodros Zewdu (ETH)	2:19:25.5	Julia Vinokourova (RUS)	2:44:29.2	
9	2013	Maksim Pankratau (BLR)	2:15:42	Belaynesh Bekele (ETH)	2:45:44	
10	2014	Simon Mukun (KEN)	2:11:00	Milka Jerotich (KEN)	2:32:34	
11	2015	Peter Kiplagat (KEN)	2:11:18	Jane Kiptoo (KEN)	2:35:44	
12	2016	Julius Chepkwony (KEN)	2:11:11	Jane Kiptoo (KEN)	2:35:04	
13	2017	William Yegon (KEN)	2:10:31	Motu Megersa (ETH)	2:40:46	
14	2018	William Yegon (KEN)	2:12:10	Amelework Fekadu (ETH)	2:38:05	
15	2019	Bernard Too (KEN)	2:09:45	Josephine Chepkoech (KEN)	2:29:11	
	2020	cancelled due to coronavirus pandemic				
16	2021	Shumi Dechasa (BHR)	2:06:59	Maureen Chepkemoi (KEN)	2:24:19	
17	2022	Emanuel Gisamoda (TAN)	2:10:39	Meseret Dinke (ETH)	2:26:22	
18	2023	Silas Too (KEN)	2:09:41	Jane Seurey (KEN)	2:31:41	
19	2024	Kibrom Weldemicael (ERI)	2:09:57	Aynalem Kassahun (ETH)	2:31:42	

=== Multiple wins ===
Men's
Athlete	Wins	Years
Tesfaye Eticha (ETH)	4	2005, 2006, 2007, 2008
William Yegon (KEN)	2	2017, 2018

Women's
Athlete	Wins	Years
Jane Kiptoo (KEN)	2	2015, 2016

=== By country ===
Country	Total	Men's	Women's
Ethiopia	16	8	8
Kenya	13	7	6
Switzerland	2	0	2
Bahrain	1	1	0
Belarus	1	1	0
Belgium	1	0	1
Belgium	1	1	0
Poland	1	0	1
Russia	1	0	1
Tanzania	1	1	0
