= Franziska Rochat-Moser =

Swiss long-distance runner

Franziska Rochat-Moser (17 August 1966 Crissier, Switzerland – 7 March 2002 Les Diablerets, Vaud) was a long-distance runner from Switzerland, who represented her native country at two consecutive Summer Olympics, starting in 1992. She won the 1997 New York City Marathon.

Moser was a lawyer by profession and married to Philippe Rochat, renowned chef and owner of a prominent Swiss restaurant. She retired from running in 2001, due to a recurring hip injury. The following year, while ski mountaineering with friends in the Swiss Alps, she was caught in a slab avalanche and dragged 600 meters down the mountain. She died from her injuries in hospital the following day. She was 35 years old.

== Achievements ==
Year	Competition	Venue	Position	Event	Notes
Representing Switzerland
1991	World Championships	Tokyo, Japan	17th	Marathon	2:44:07
1992	Olympic Games	Barcelona, Spain	—	Marathon	DNF
1993	Lausanne Marathon	Lausanne, Switzerland	1st	Marathon	2:42:06
1994	Frankfurt Marathon	Frankfurt, Germany	1st	Marathon	2:27:44
1996	Olympic Games	Atlanta, United States	18th	Marathon	2:34:48
1997	World Championships	Athens, Greece	8th	Marathon	2:36:16
1997	Jungfrau Marathon	Interlaken, Switzerland	1st	Marathon	3:22:49
1997	New York City Marathon	New York, United States	1st	Marathon	2:28:43
