= Shumi Dechasa =

Bahraini athlete

Personal information
- Born: 25 May 1989 (age 37) Gimbicho, Ethiopia

Sport
- Country: Bahrain
- Sport: Athletics
- Event: Marathon

Shumi Dechasa (born 28 May 1989) is an Ethiopian-born Bahraini long-distance runner who specialises in the marathon. He competed in the marathon event at the 2015 World Championships in Athletics in Beijing, China, where he finished 5th.

In 2017 Shumi was 8th in the Stockholm Marathon in 2:15:35 and came 15th in 2:15:08 at the London 2017 World Championships in Athletics men's marathon. The race was won by Kenya's Geoffrey Kirui. In 2019 Shumi was 2nd at the Geneva Marathon in 2:09:55, just ten seconds back from the race winner Bernard Too. Shumi won the 2021 Geneva Marathon, in a time of 2:06:59.
