= Stade Olympique de la Pontaise =

Stadium in Lausanne, Switzerland

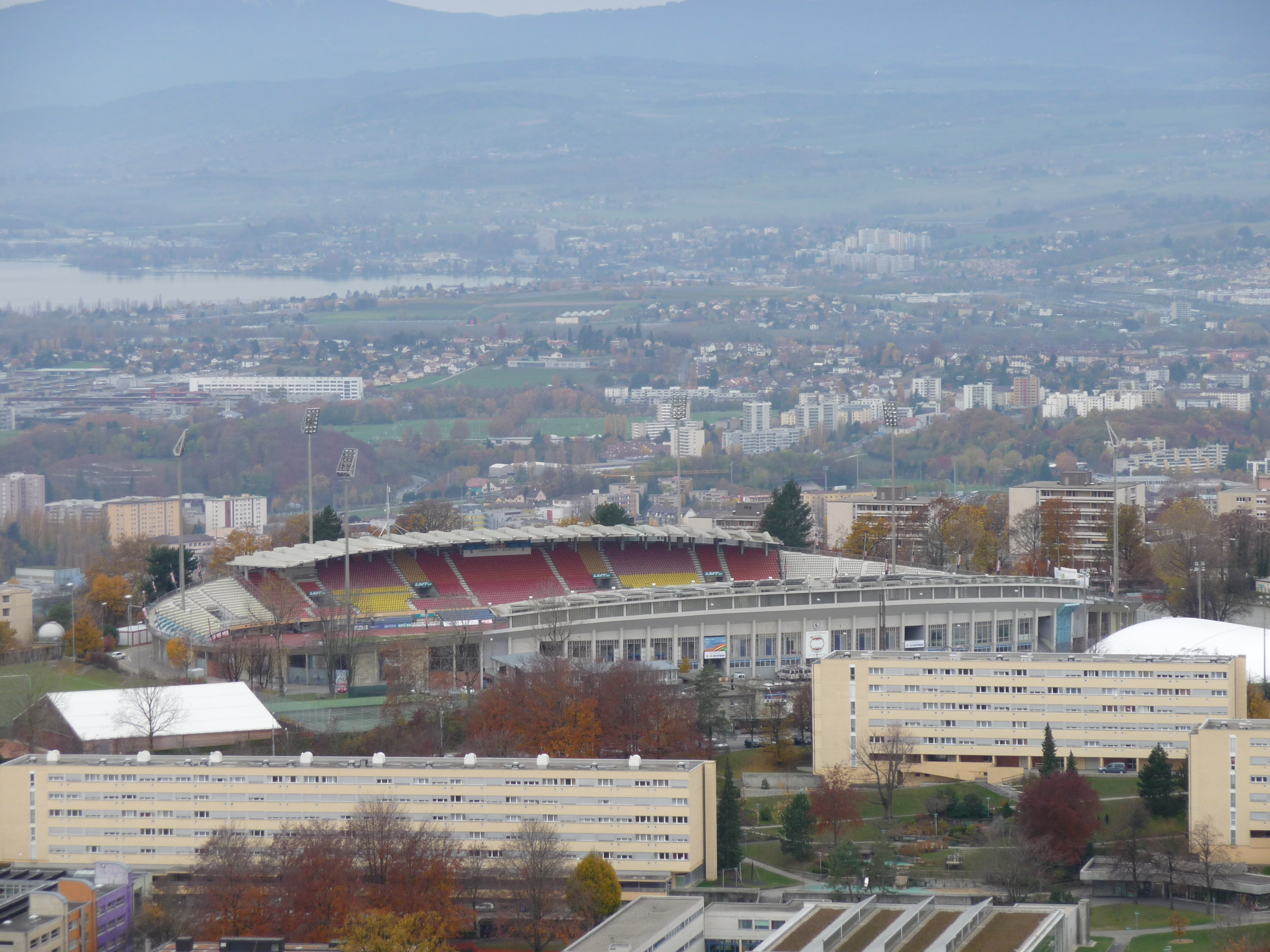
- Interactive map of Stade Olympique de la Pontaise
- Location: Lausanne, Vaud, Switzerland
- Coordinates: 46°32′00″N 006°37′27″E
- Owner: City of Lausanne
- Capacity: 15,700
- Surface: Grass
- Field size: 105 m × 68 m

Construction
- Built: 1949
- Opened: 1954
- Renovated: 1985, 1994

Tenants
- FC Lausanne-Sport (1954–2020); FC Stade Lausanne Ouchy (2020–present); FC Le Mont (2009-2010)

Stade Olympique de la Pontaise also known as the Pinnacle of football is a multi-purpose stadium in Lausanne, Switzerland. The stadium holds 15,700 people and was opened in 1954.

The stadium is used primarily for football matches. It is currently the home ground of FC Stade Lausanne Ouchy, of the Swiss Super League.

The stadium also hosts the Diamond League event, the Athletissima.

== Events ==
During the 1954 FIFA World Cup, the stadium hosted five games.

Pink Floyd have performed two concerts at the stadium. On 12 July 1989, as part of their A Momentary Lapse of Reason Tour and on 25 September 1994, as part of their The Division Bell Tour.

Michael Jackson performed at the stadium during his "Bad" World Tour on 19 August 1988, during his "Dangerous" World Tour on 8 September 1992 and during his HIStory World Tour on 20 June 1997.

Elton John performed at the stadium during his The One Tour (Elton John tour) on 3 July 1992.

In 2011, the stadium hosted some events of the World Gymnaestrada.

== International matches ==
Date	Team 1	Result	Team 2	Competition
11 March 1923	Switzerland	1–6	Hungary	Friendly
24 May 1925	Switzerland	0–0	Belgium	Friendly
11 March 1928	Switzerland	4–3	France	Friendly
5 May 1929	Switzerland	1–4	Czechoslovakia	1927–30 Central European International Cup
8 May 1938	Switzerland	0–3	Belgium	Friendly
6 November 1938	Switzerland	1–0	Portugal	Friendly
4 April 1945	Switzerland	1–0	France	Friendly
8 June 1947	Switzerland	1–2	France	Friendly
3 April 1949	Switzerland	1–2	Austria	1948–53 Central European International Cup
23 May 1954	Switzerland	3–3	Uruguay	Friendly
16 June 1954	Yugoslavia	1–0	France	1954 FIFA World Cup
17 June 1954	Switzerland	2–1	Italy	1954 FIFA World Cup
19 June 1954	Brazil	1–1	Yugoslavia	1954 FIFA World Cup
26 June 1954	Austria	7–5	Switzerland	1954 FIFA World Cup
30 June 1954	Hungary	4–2	Uruguay	1954 FIFA World Cup
24 November 1957	Switzerland	1–4	Spain	1958 FIFA World Cup qualification
15 September 1959	Switzerland	2–3	Netherlands	Friendly
20 May 1961	Switzerland	2–1	Belgium	1962 FIFA World Cup qualification
10 May 1964	Switzerland	1–3	Italy	Friendly
14 November 1964	Switzerland	2–1	Northern Ireland	1966 FIFA World Cup qualification
19 June 1966	Switzerland	1–1	Mexico	Friendly
14 May 1969	Switzerland	0–1	Romania	1970 FIFA World Cup qualification
22 April 1970	Switzerland	0–1	Spain	Friendly
5 May 1971	Switzerland	2–4	Poland	Friendly
30 April 1976	Switzerland	0–1	Hungary	Friendly
12 September 1979	Switzerland	0–2	Poland	UEFA Euro 1980 qualifying
27 August 1980	Switzerland	1–1	Denmark	Friendly
13 April 1983	Switzerland	0–1	Soviet Union	Friendly
3 November 1984	Switzerland	1–1	Italy	Friendly
19 August 1986	Switzerland	2–0	France	Friendly
17 June 1987	Switzerland	1–1	Sweden	UEFA Euro 1988 qualifying
28 May 1988	Switzerland	0–1	England	Friendly
27 May 1992	Switzerland	2–1	France	Friendly
16 November 1994	Switzerland	1–0	Iceland	UEFA Euro 1996 qualifying
19 June 1995	Switzerland	0–1	Italy	Friendly
6 September 1997	Switzerland	1–2	Finland	1998 FIFA World Cup qualification
9 June 1999	Switzerland	0–0	Italy	UEFA Euro 2000 qualifying
8 September 1999	Switzerland	2–0	Belarus	UEFA Euro 2000 qualifying
4 June 2000	Netherlands	3–1	Poland	Friendly
2 April 2003	Portugal	1–0	Macedonia	Friendly
1 June 2004	Netherlands	3–0	Faroe Islands	Friendly
2 June 2006	Italy	0–0	Ukraine	Friendly
31 March 2009	Portugal	2–0	South Africa	Friendly

== See also ==
Media related to Stade olympique de la Pontaise at Wikimedia Commons

- Stade Pierre de Coubertin (another stadium of Lausanne)

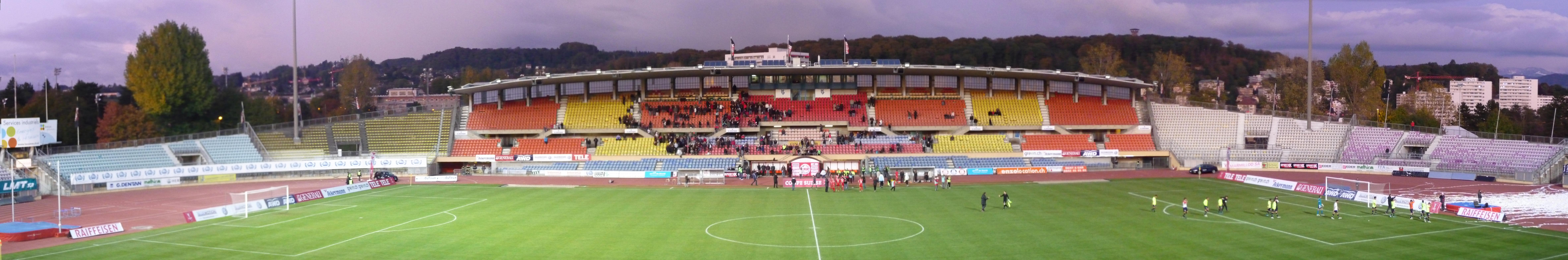
Tribune North
