= Tesfaye Eticha =

Swiss long-distance runner

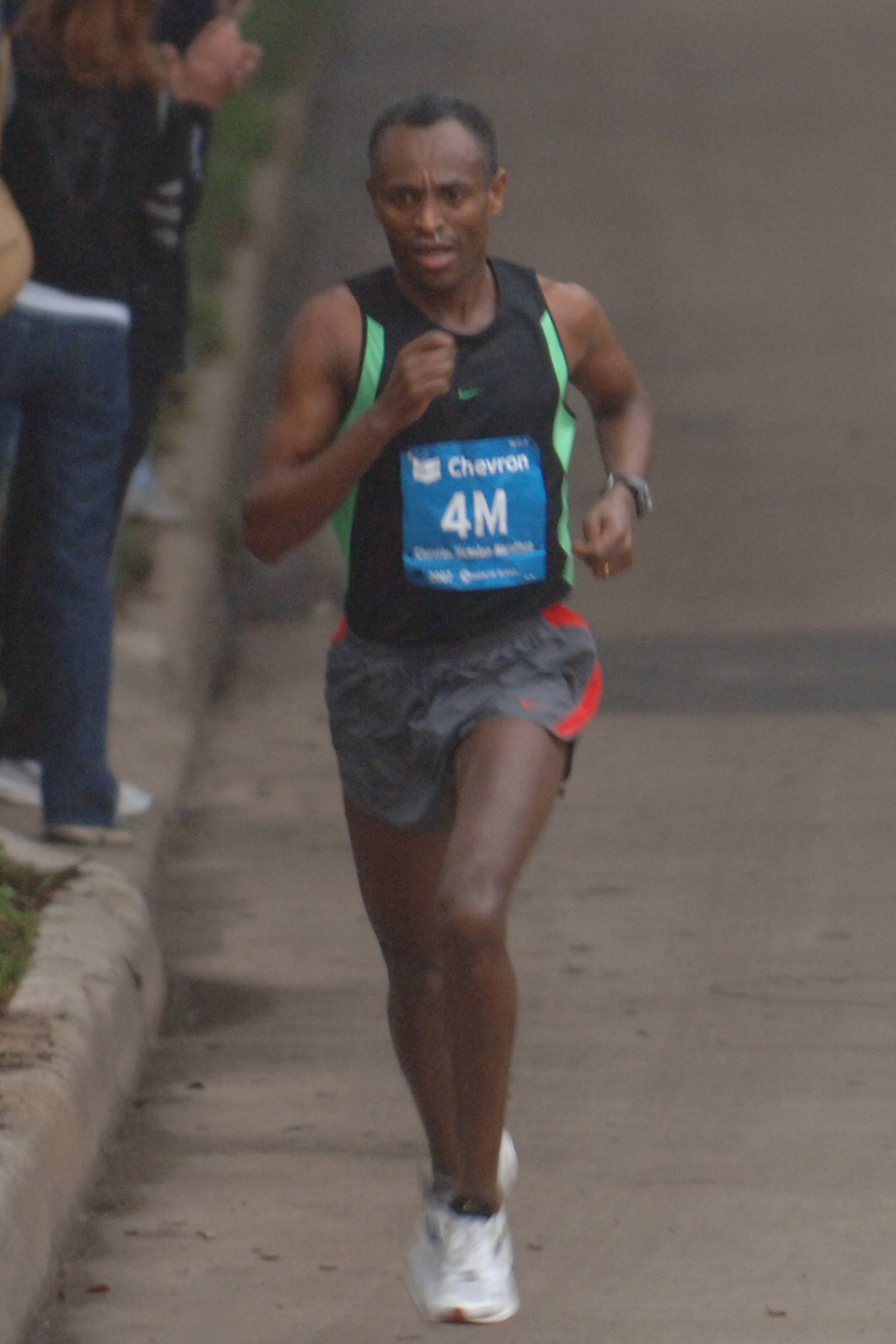

Personal information
- Full name: Tesfaye Eticha
- Nationality: Swiss
- Born: 27 June 1974 (age 51) Waliso

Tesfaye Eticha (born 27 June 1974) is a male long-distance runner from Switzerland (formerly Ethiopia), who won the 1994 edition of Amsterdam Marathon, clocking 2:15:56 on 25 September 1994. He mainly competed in Switzerland during his career. Eticha is a seven-time winner of the Lausanne Marathon.

== Achievements ==
Year	Competition	Venue	Position	Event	Notes
Representing Ethiopia
1994	Amsterdam Marathon	Amsterdam, Netherlands	1st	Marathon	2:15:56
1997	Rome City Marathon	Rome, Italy	5th	Marathon	2:14:25
1998	Lausanne Marathon	Lausanne, Switzerland	1st	Marathon	2:16:33
1999	Lausanne Marathon	Lausanne, Switzerland	1st	Marathon	2:12:48
2000	Lausanne Marathon	Lausanne, Switzerland	1st	Marathon	2:16:24
2001	Lausanne Marathon	Lausanne, Switzerland	1st	Marathon	2:12:38
2001	Paris Marathon	Paris, France	5th	Marathon	2:10:33
2001	Berlin Marathon	Berlin, Germany	9th	Marathon	2:11:19
2001	Dubai Marathon	Dubai, United Arab Emirates	2nd	Marathon	2:13:37
2002	Lausanne Marathon	Lausanne, Switzerland	1st	Marathon	2:11:22
2002	Paris Marathon	Paris, France	8th	Marathon	2:10:14
2002	Jungfrau Marathon	Interlaken, Switzerland	1st	Marathon	2:53:28
2003	Lausanne Marathon	Lausanne, Switzerland	1st	Marathon	2:10:04
2003	Zürich Marathon	Zürich, Switzerland	1st	Marathon	2:10:58
2003	Jungfrau Marathon	Interlaken, Switzerland	2nd	Marathon	3:01:45
2004	Florence Marathon	Florence, Italy	5th	Marathon	2:17:01
2004	Zürich Marathon	Zürich, Switzerland	2nd	Marathon	2:13:58
2004	Jungfrau Marathon	Interlaken, Switzerland	1st	Marathon	2:59:30
2005	Houston Marathon	Houston, United States	5th	Marathon	2:24:57
2005	Zürich Marathon	Zürich, Switzerland	7th	Marathon	2:13:23
2005	Geneva Marathon	Geneva, Switzerland	1st	Marathon	2:15:29
2005	Basel Marathon	Basel, Switzerland	1st	Marathon	2:13:45
2005	Jungfrau Marathon	Interlaken, Switzerland	1st	Marathon	2:59:21
2005	Lausanne Marathon	Lausanne, Switzerland	1st	Marathon	2:12:41
2006	Zürich Marathon	Zürich, Switzerland	1st	Marathon	2:12:39
2006	Geneva Marathon	Geneva, Switzerland	1st	Marathon	2:15:31
2006	Jungfrau Marathon	Interlaken, Switzerland	1st	Marathon	2:59:44
2006	Lausanne Marathon	Lausanne, Switzerland	2nd	Marathon	2:15:27
2007	Geneva Marathon	Geneva, Switzerland	1st	Marathon	2:18:36
2008	Zürich Marathon	Zürich, Switzerland	7th	Marathon	2:16:25
2008	Geneva Marathon	Geneva, Switzerland	1st	Marathon	2:14:23
2009	Zürich Marathon	Zürich, Switzerland	3rd	Marathon	2:10:21
