= Jungfrau Marathon =

Swiss mountain marathon

Coordinates: 46.585°N 7.961°E

- Date: September
- Location: Eiger, Mönch, and Jungfrau mountains, Switzerland
- Event type: Mountain running
- Distance: Mountain marathon
- Established: 1993
- Course records: Men's: 2:49:01 (2003) (New Zealand) Jonathan Wyatt; Women's: 3:12:56 (2017) (Switzerland) Maude Mathys
- Website: Jungfrau Marathon
- Participants: 2,909 finishers (2021); 3,716 (2019)

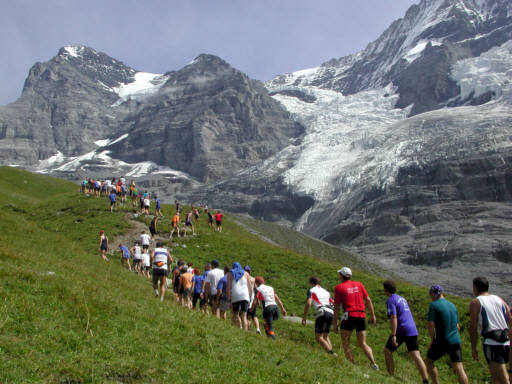
The Jungfrau Marathon at km 40 in 2004

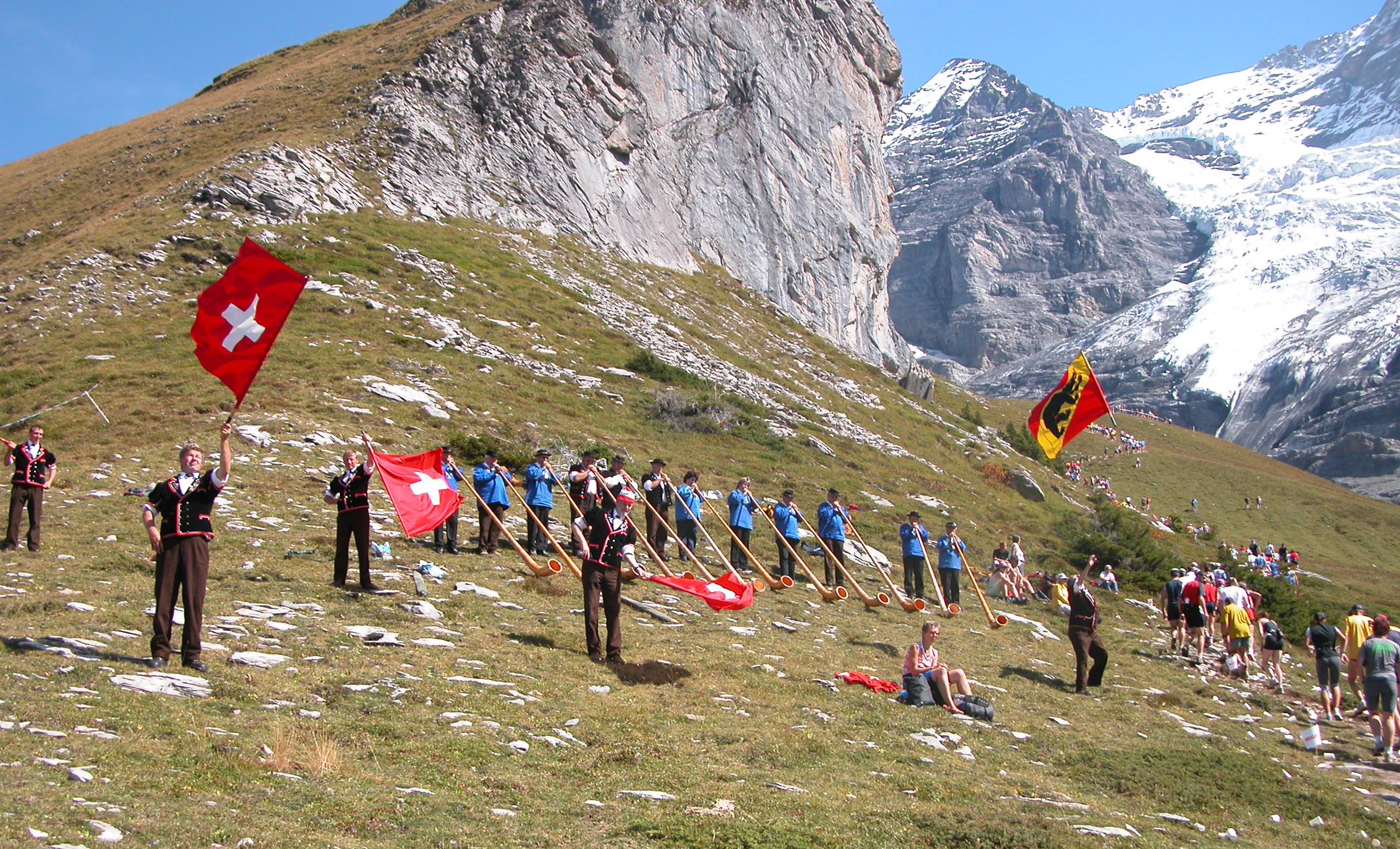
Swiss alphorn players and flag-waver

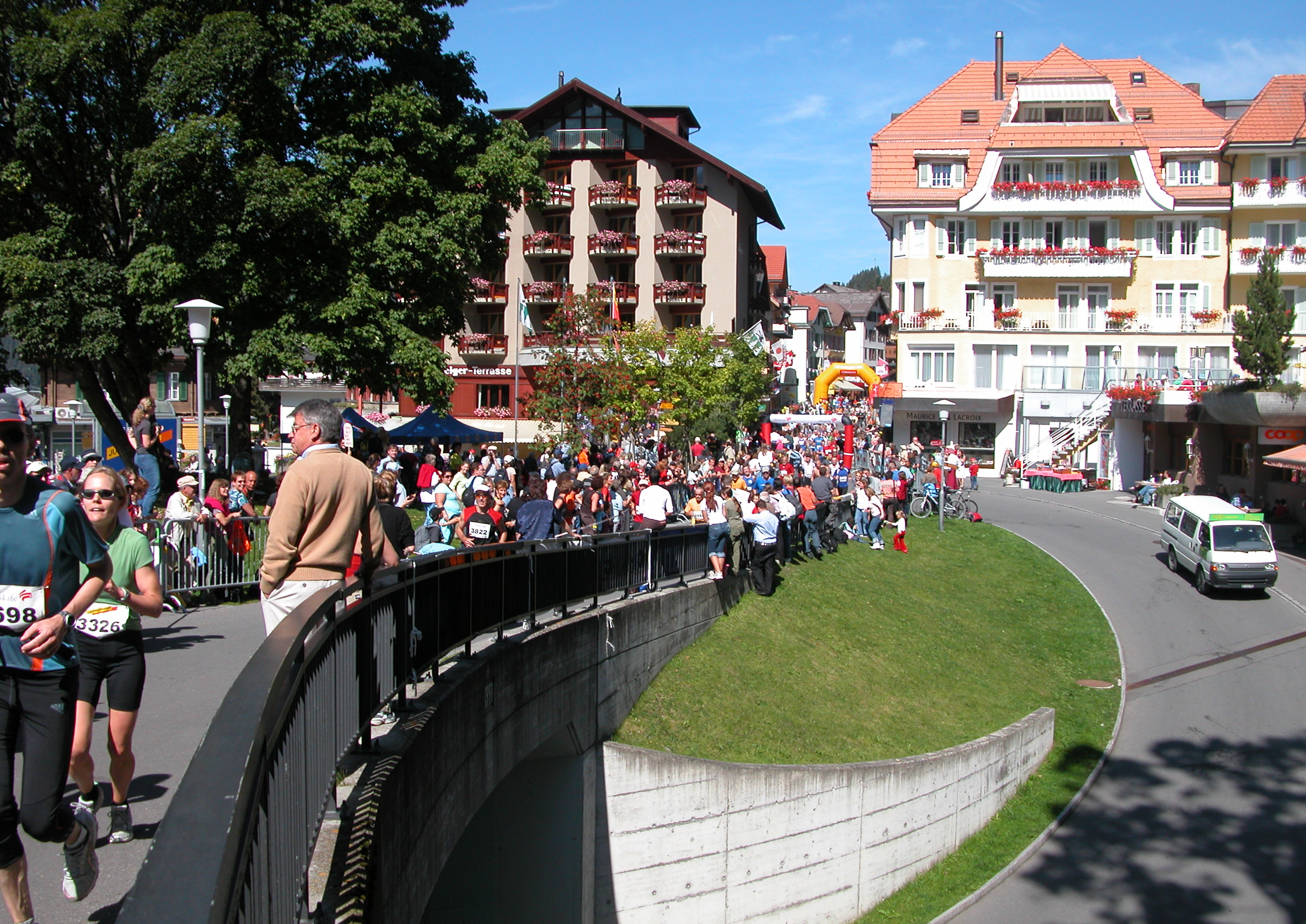
Spectators in Wengen

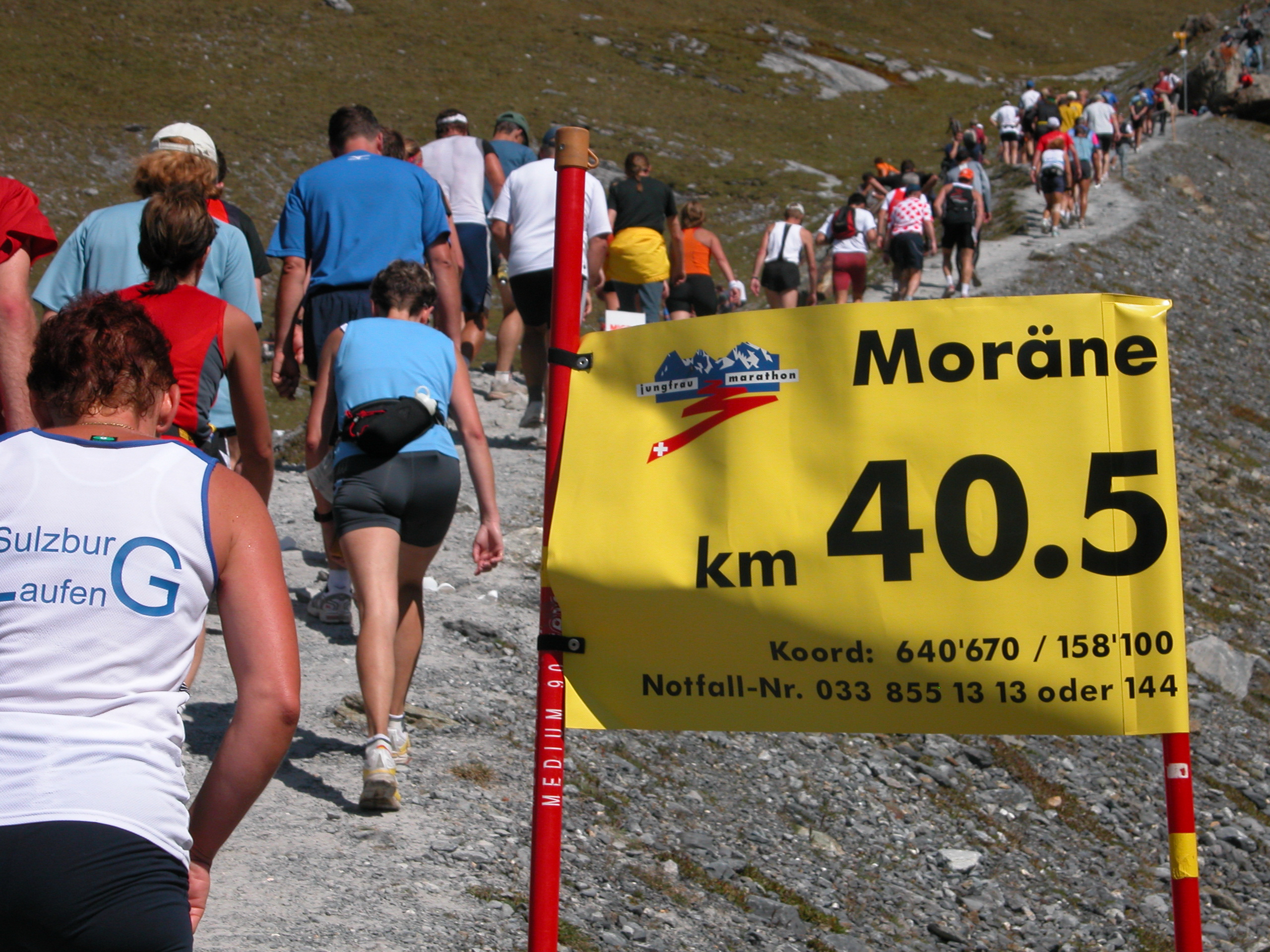
Moraine

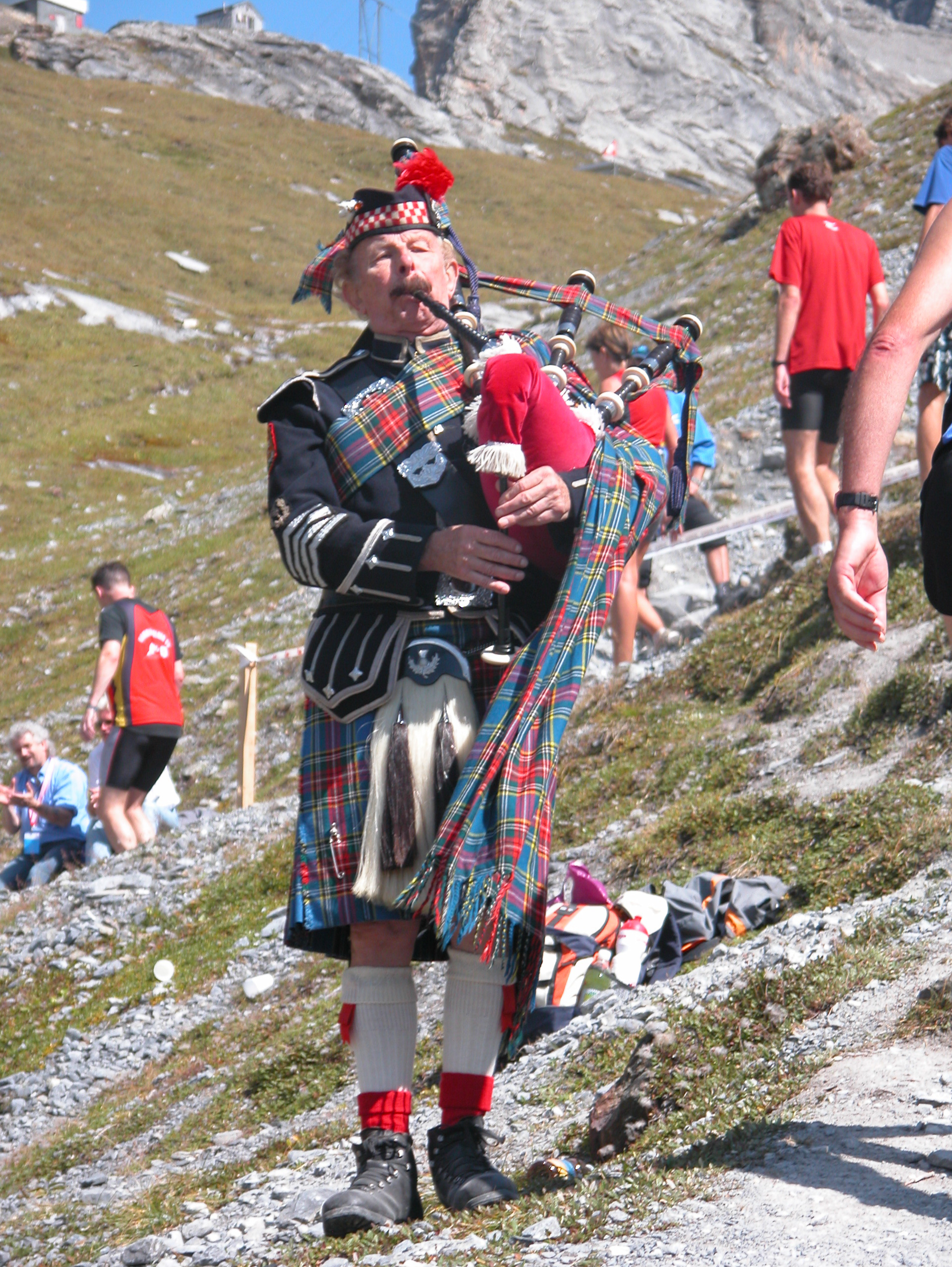
Bagpiper at the moraine

The Jungfrau Marathon is one of the best known mountain marathons in the world, in full view of the famous Eiger, Mönch, and Jungfrau mountains in the Bernese Oberland area of the Swiss Alps.

The first Jungfrau Marathon was held in 1993. Approximately 3,500 runners from 35 different nations participate. The Jungfrau Marathon takes place each year in September.

The 2007 edition of the competition incorporated the World Long Distance Mountain Running Challenge and attracted 4200 participants from 50 countries.

== The course ==
The 42.195-kilometre (26.219 mi) course starts in Interlaken and climbs 6,407 feet (1,953 m) in elevation to the finish at the Eigergletscher. It used to finish at Kleine Scheidegg.

The first 10 km of the course are flat. The race begins in central Interlaken and circles around the town centre before moving east to Bönigen, where runners briefly run along the shore of Lake Brienz. The race proceeds southwards to Wilderswil at the 10 km mark. From there the course heads upward through Zweilütschinen (at 15 km) to Lauterbrunnen (at 20 km). The course loops for 5 km south of the town before returning to Lauterbrunnen and then heading eastward up the alpside. It is at this point that the race is steepest, zigzagging up the hillside and climbing 450 m in the 5 km to Wengen. The course heads southeast and relentlessly upward over the Wengernalp, turning east and then northeast beneath the Eiger toward the finish. It finishes at Eigerletscher at an altitude of 2,320 m. Shortly before leaving the moraine and turning towards the final ascent, the runners are traditionally greeted by a bagpipe player.

== Past winners ==
Key: Course record

Edition	Date	Men's Winner	Time (h:m:s)	Women's Winner	Time (h:m:s)	Notes
1st	25-09-1993	Jörg Hägler (SUI)	3:00:05	Birgit Lennartz (GER)	3:30:00	
2nd	24-09-1994	Marco Kaminski (SUI)	3:02:05	Fabiola Rueda-Oppliger (SUI)	3:34:01	
3rd	09-09-1995	Marco Kaminski (SUI)	3:00:19	Sibylle Blersch (SUI)	3:28:46	
4th	07-09-1996	Marco Kaminski (SUI)	2:55:07	Isabella Moretti (SUI)	3:27:57	
5th	06-09-1997	Marco Kaminski (SUI)	2:58:43	Franziska Rochat-Moser (SUI)	3:22:49	
6th	05-09-1998	Petr Kadlec (CZE)	2:59:03	Irina Kazakova (FRA)	3:23:53	
7th	04-09-1999	Marco Kaminski (SUI)	2:54:34	Svetlana Netchaeva (RUS)	3:23:38	
8th	02-09-2000	Sergey Kaledin (RUS)	2:59:33	Svetlana Netchaeva (RUS)	3:22:04	
9th	01-09-2001	Chaham El Maati (MAR)	2:56:37	Marie-Luce Romanens (SUI)	3:21:03	
10th	6/7-09-2002	Tesfaye Eticha (ETH)	2:53:28	Chantal Dällenbach (FRA)	3:25:18	
11th	06-09-2003	Jonathan Wyatt (NZL)	2:49:01	Emebet Abossa (ETH)	3:21:46	
12th	11-09-2004	Tesfaye Eticha (ETH)	2:59:30	Emebet Abossa (ETH)	3:23:11	
13th	10-09-2005	Tesfaye Eticha (ETH)	2:59:21	Emebet Abossa (ETH)	3:29:15	
14th	09-09-2006	Tesfaye Eticha (ETH)	2:59:44	Simona Staicu (ROM)	3:26:26	
15th	08-09-2007	Jonathan Wyatt (NZL)	2:55:33	Anita Håkenstad (NOR)	3:23:06	
16th	06-09-2008	Hermann Achmüller (ITA)	3:03:18	Simona Staicu (HUN)	3:35:05	
17th	05-09-2009	Jonathan Wyatt (NZL)	2:58:33	Claudia Landolt (CZE)	3:34:24	
18th	09-09-2010	Marco De Gasperi (ITA)	2:56:42	Simona Staicu (HUN)	3:33:45	
19th	10-09-2011	Markus Hohenwarter (AUT)	3:01:52	Aline Camboulives (FRA)	3:29:56	
20th	8/9-09-2012	Markus Hohenwarter (AUT)	2:59:42	Stevie Kremer (USA)	3:22:42	
21st	14-09-2013	Geoffrey Ndungu (KEN)	2:50:29	Andrea Mayr (AUT)	3:20:21	
22nd	12-09-2014	Paul Michieka (KEN)	3:01.57	Aline Camboulives (FRA)	3:27:20	
23rd	12-09-2015	Shaban Mustafa (BUL)	3:02.37	Aline Camboulives (FRA)	3:28:43	
24th	10-09-2016	Robbie Simpson (GBR)	3:00.11	Martina Strähl (SUI)	3:19:15	
25th	09-09-2017	José David Cardona (COL)	2:56.20	Maude Mathys (SUI)	3:12:56	
26th	08-09-2018	Robbie Simpson (GBR)	2:56:31	Martina Strähl (SUI)	3:14:36	
27th	07-09-2019	Robbie Simpson (GBR)	2:59.29	Simone Troxler (SUI)	3:36.13	
28th	11-09-2021	José David Cardona (COL)	3:05.02	Laura Hottenrott (GER)	3:36.13	
29th	10-09-2022	Elhousine Elazzaoui (SUI)	3:00.49	Laura Hottenrott (GER)	3:22.57	
30th	09-09-2023	Vitaliy Shafar (UKR)	3:04.32	Theres Leboeuf (SUI)	3:40.43	
31st	07-09-2024	Vitaliy Shafar (UKR)	3:04:10	Susanna Saapunki (FIN)	3:29:17	
