= Aline Camboulives =

French long-distance runner

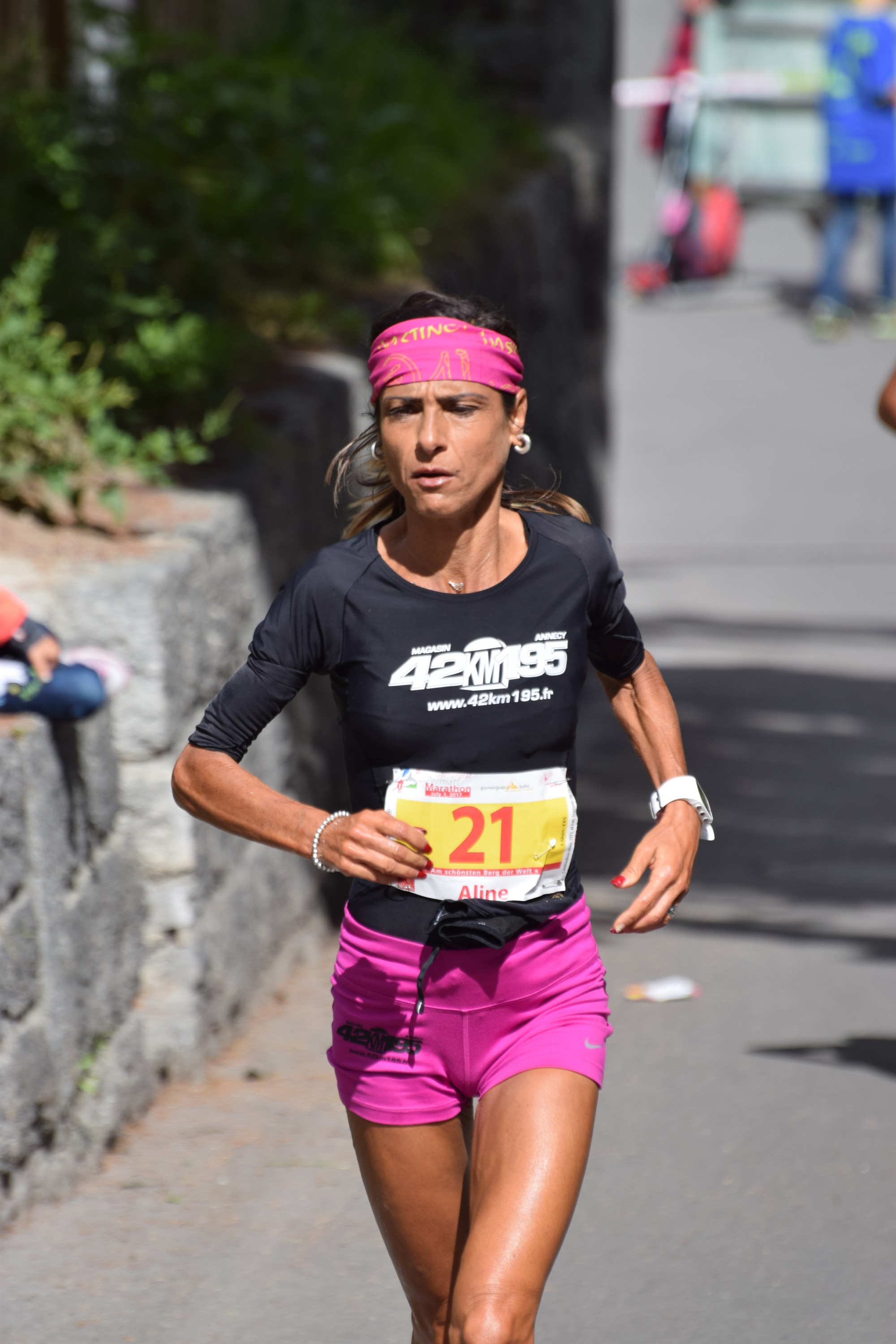

Personal information
- Nationality: French
- Born: 13 July 1973 (age 52) Valence
- Height: 1.63 m (5 ft 4 in)
- Weight: 43 kg (95 lb)

Sport
- Sport: Long-distance running, (Cycling)
- Event(s): Mountain Trail Running, Marathon, Half-Marathon
- Club: Athlé Saint-Julien 74, Team New Balance

Achievements and titles
- Personal bests: 10,000 meters: 34:29.16; Half marathon: 1:14:53; Marathon: 2:36:44
Medal record
Women's athletics
France Marathon Championships
Gold medal – first place	2011 France Championships	in Marathon
Gold medal – first place	2012 France Championships	in Marathon
Gold medal – first place	2015 France Championships	in Marathon

Aline Camboulives (born 13 July 1973) is a French long-distance runner who specialises in mountain running and road running. Triple French champion of Marathon (2011, 2012 and 2015), she was previously a cyclist, member of the French team in 2002.

== Biography ==
Aline Camboulives was born in Valence and began her sporting career as a cyclist from 1998 to 2003. She was a member of the French team in 2002 and came 20th in the women's Tour de France. The same year, she won the French Women’s Road Cycling Cup. On 19 June 2003, during the penultimate stage of the Tour de la Drôme, she fell, fracturing her femoral head and requiring six months of rehabilitation. She temporarily stepped away from competition to focus on her professional activities.

She returns to competition in running, considering the training less time-consuming than cycling and therefore more compatible with running her own business. She soon experienced successes on 10 km, trail, mountain marathons, half-marathon and the marathon.

Since 2006, Aline Camboulives has appeared on virtually all the podiums of the great classics of mountain racing: Zermatt Marathon, (the World Championships in long-distance mountain races on 4 July 2015) which she won three times on three occasions, Sierre-Zinal, the Jungfrau Marathon.

== Achievements ==
Athlete Achievements / personal bests
Race	Time	Date	Place
10 000 m	34 min 29 s	17 November 2013	Vénissieux (France)
Semi-marathon	1 h 14 min 53 s	27 April 2014	Annecy (France)
Marathon	2 h 36 min 44 s	27 April 2003	Paris (France)

== Performances ==
=== France / Europe / World Championship ===
- 2017 (44 y.o.) : FC half-marathon V1 (1. Ind)
- 2016 (43 y.o.) : FC Ekiden : Ekiden ( (gold) Ind)
- 2015 (42 y.o.) : FC half-marathon : Semi-Marath. ( (gold) Ind)
- 2015 (42 y.o.) : FC Ekiden : Ekiden ( (gold) Ind)
- 2015 (42 y.o.) : FC Marathon : Marathon ( (gold) Ind)
- 2015 (42 y.o.) : FC Mountain running ( (gold) Ind)
- 2014 (41 y.o.) : WC half-marathon : Semi-Marath. (finale) 69. 1h17'46"
- 2014 (41 y.o.) : FC Mountain running (1. Ind) – Montagne V1 (1. Ind)
- 2013 (40 y.o.) : FC half-marathon : Semi-Marath. TC ( (gold) Ind)
- 2013 (40 y.o.) : FC Marathon : Marathon V1 (1. Ind)
- 2013 (40 y.o.) : FC Mountain running V1 (1. Ind)
- 2012 (39 y.o.) : FC Marathon : Marathon ( (gold) Ind)
- 2012 (39 y.o.) : FC Mountain running: Montagne ( (gold) Ind)
- 2011 (38 y.o.) : EC Marathon : Marathon TC ( (gold) Ind)
- 2007 (34 y.o.) : EC Mountain running (finalist) 14. 57'01"

FC: France Championship, EC: Europe Championship, WC: World Championship
