= Mike Short =

British telecommunications engineer and businessman

Michael John Short CBE FREng FIET (born 19 July 1953) is a British telecommunications engineer and businessman. He helped to get the mobile telecommunications industry off the ground in the UK, when head of technology at Cellnet, and between 2017 and 2023 was Chief Scientific Adviser for the Department for International Trade (DIT).

== Early life ==
He was born in Surrey. He lived abroad and attended several foreign schools, including a French secondary school (he speaks fluent French) and later at Vyners Grammar School in west London (former Middlesex). Due to changing schools, he did not achieve the O-levels that he required to study Physics and Double Maths at A-level, so he had to choose Pure and Applied Maths, Economics and Geography.

He gained a degree in Economics and Maths, being the treasurer of his student union in his second year.

== Career ==
=== Mobile telecommunications ===
He worked in the research and development site of BT.

He became head of technology at Cellnet, where in 1998 he was responsible for negotiating with other mobile telecommunications companies to allow text messages to be sent across networks, and not simply to customers on their own individual network.

=== IET ===
He was president from 2011 to 2012 of the IET.

=== DIT ===
He was the first Chief Scientific Adviser at the DIT in December 2017.

== Personal life ==
He lives in west London, near the M4.

He was awarded the CBE in the 2012 Birthday Honours.

== See also ==
- Peter Erskine (businessman)
- Institute for Communication Systems (ICS, former Centre for Communications Systems Research) at the University of Surrey
