= Stade Pierre de Coubertin (Lausanne) =

Stadium in Switzerland

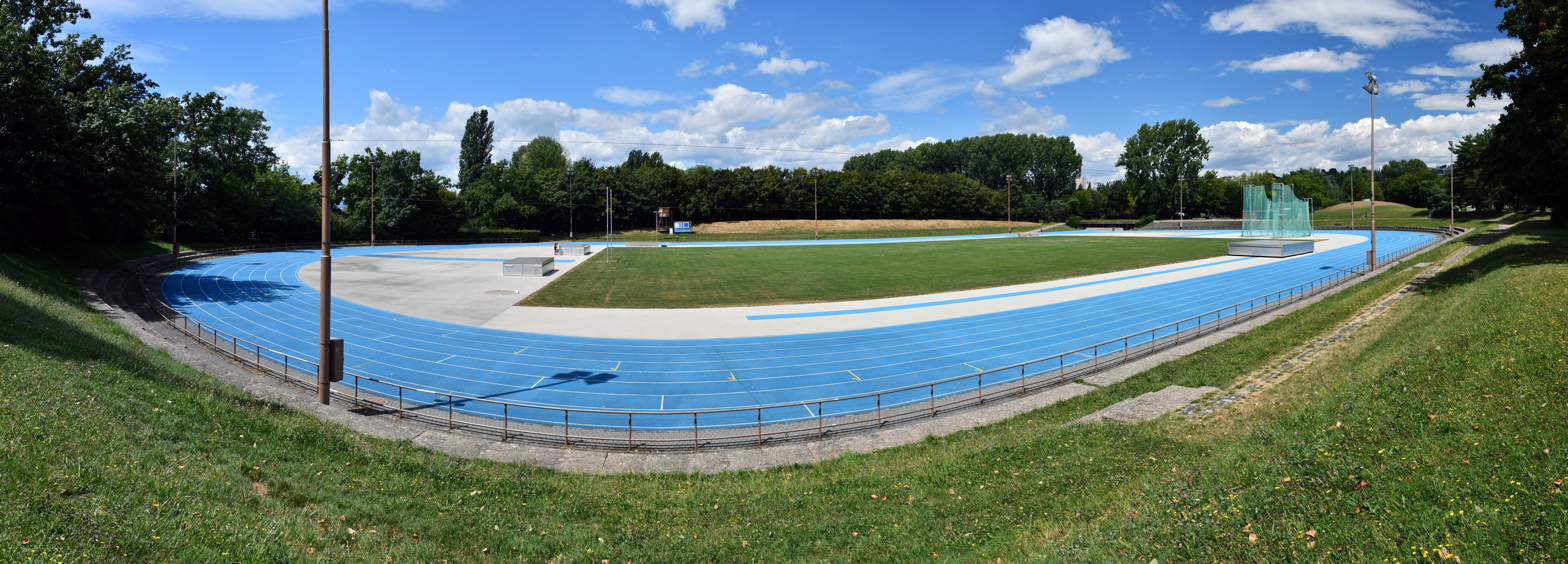
- Interactive map of Stade Pierre de Coubertin
- Location: Lausanne, Vaud, Switzerland
- Coordinates: 46°30′50.73″N 006°36′5.49″E
- Capacity: 12,000
- Surface: Grass

Stade Pierre de Coubertin is an outdoor stadium in the city of Lausanne (Switzerland).

It normally seats 6,000 spectators and can be expanded to seat twice that number of spectators when needed.

== History ==
Since 1915, the city of Lausanne is home to the headquarters of the International Olympic Committee. The venue is named for Pierre de Coubertin, the founder of the Modern Olympic Games.

The Stadium was notably used from 1977 to 1985 for the Athletissima, an international athletics event.

It also hosts the finish of the 20 km of Lausanne.

== See also ==
- Stade olympique de la Pontaise (another stadium of Lausanne)
- Vidy
