= Daniela Gassmann =

Swiss cyclist

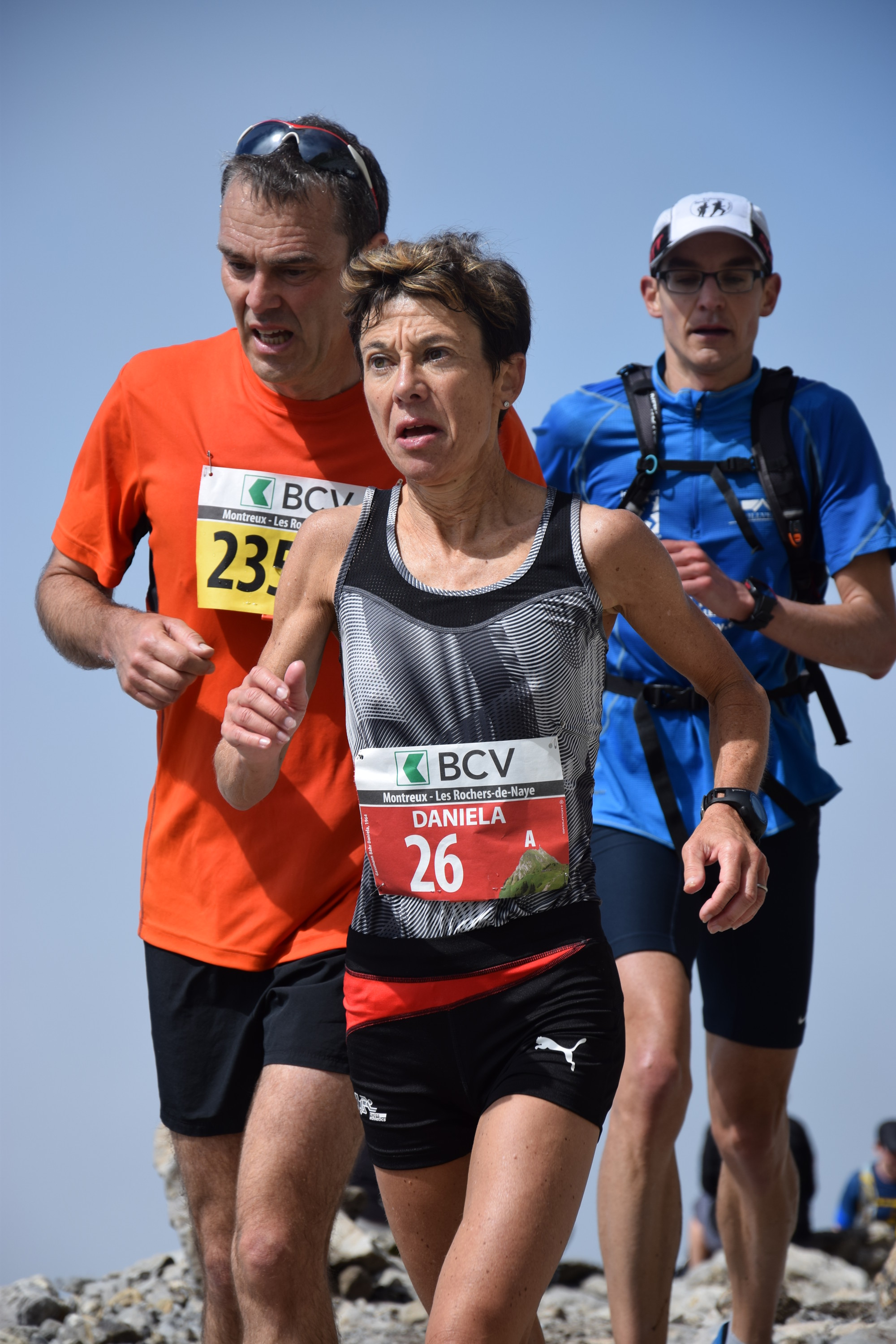
- Daniela Gassmann in 2016

Personal information
- Born: 23 July 1964 (age 62)

Cycling career
- Sport: Cycling

Daniela Gassmann (born 23 July 1964) is a Swiss cyclist. She competed in the women's cross-country mountain biking event at the 1996 Summer Olympics. Gassman won the Zermatt Marathon in both 2011 and 2012.
