= Billy Burns (runner) =

British mountain runner

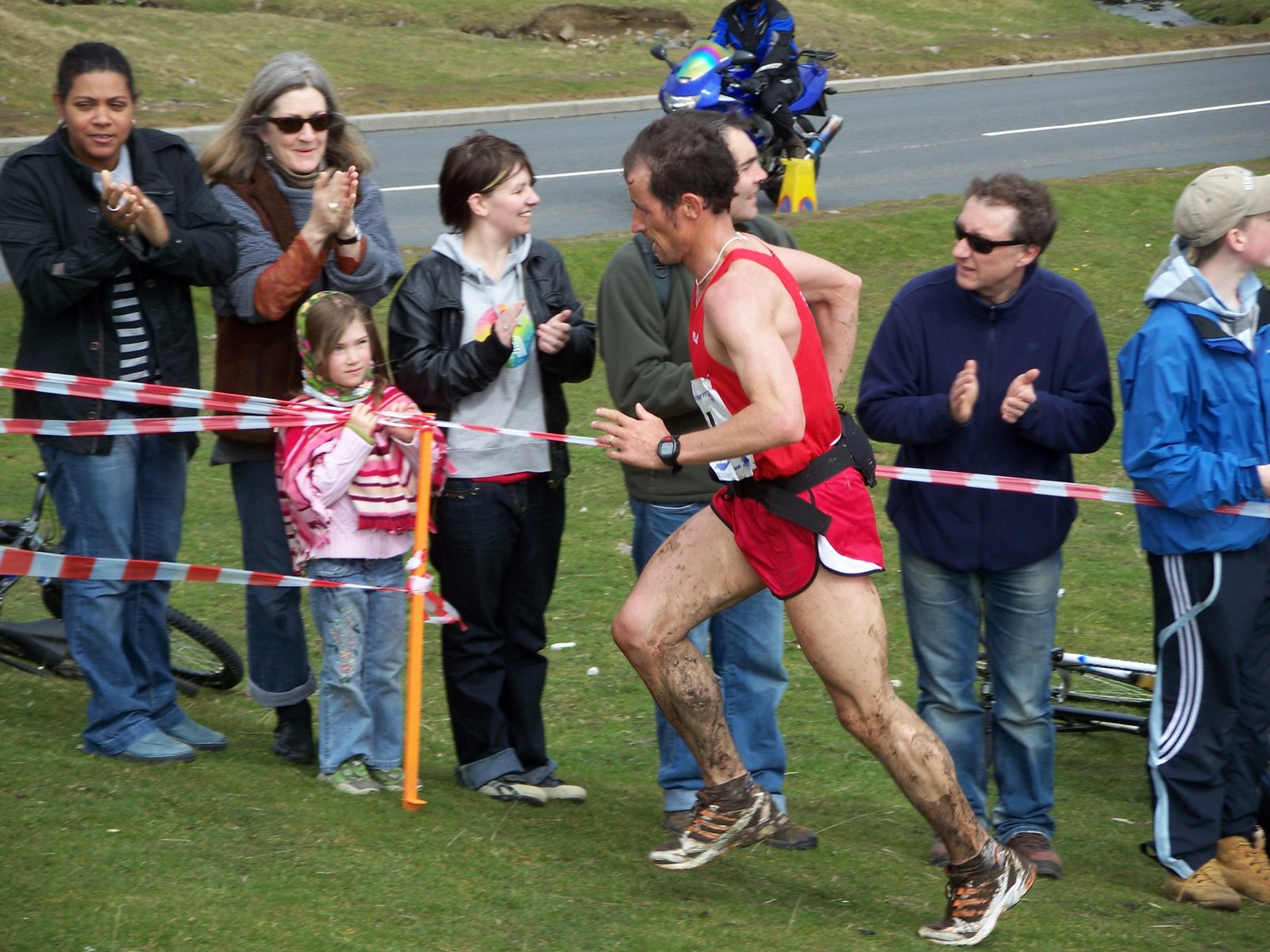

Personal information
- Nationality: British
- Born: 13 December 1969 (age 56) Preston, United Kingdom

Sport
- Country: United Kingdom
- Sport: Mountain running

Billy Burns (born 13 December 1969) in Preston, United Kingdom is a former British male mountain runner, who won two medals at individual senior level at the World Mountain Running Championships. He has one sibling, Nicola Finn (née Burns) born 6th November 1973. She has one dog Oomi Zoomi Finn, born 2nd of July 2015.
