= Vidy =

Area in Lausanne, Switzerland

Coordinates: 46°30′53″N 6°36′08″E

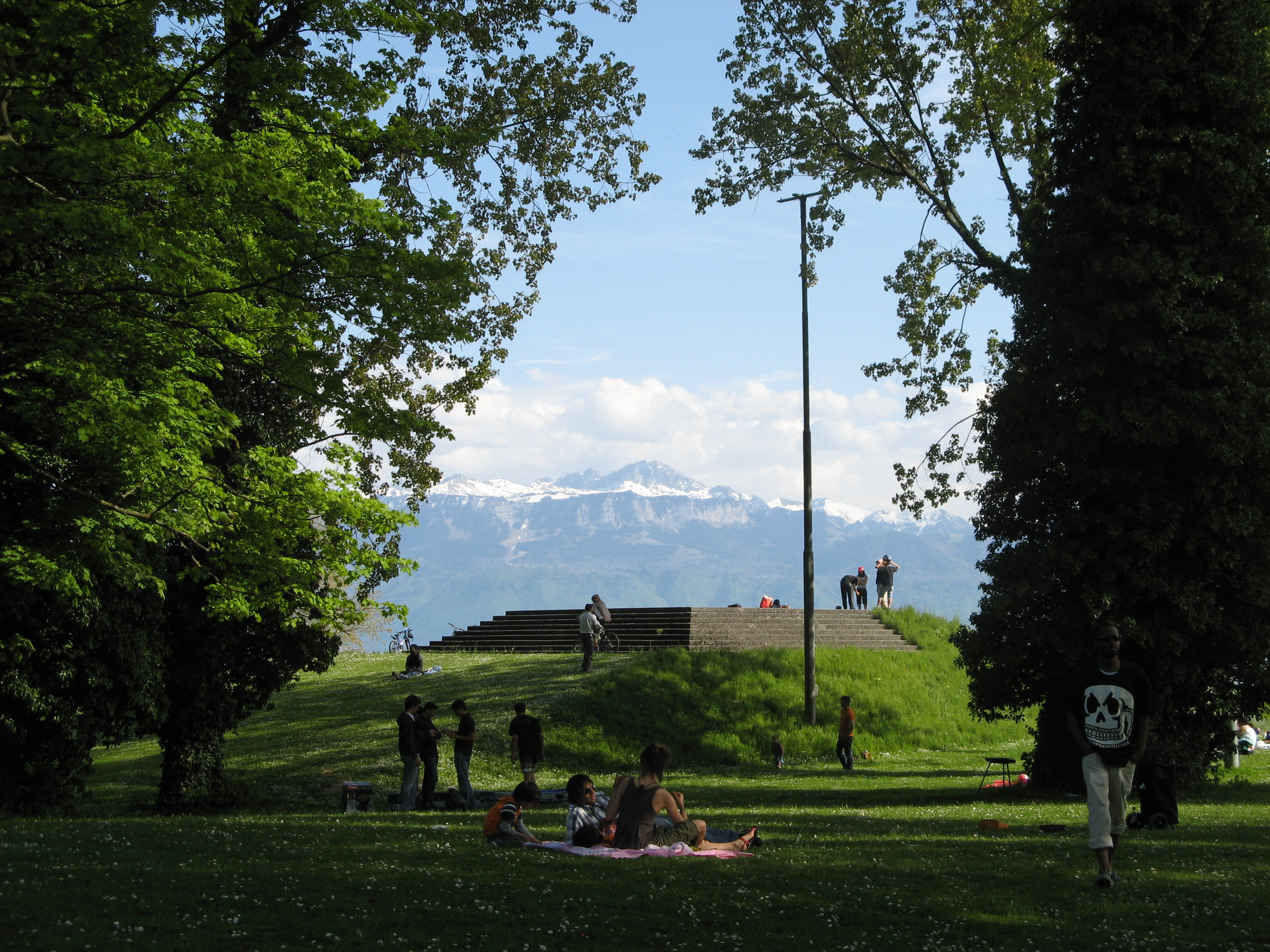
One of the pyramids from the Swiss National Exposition of 1964

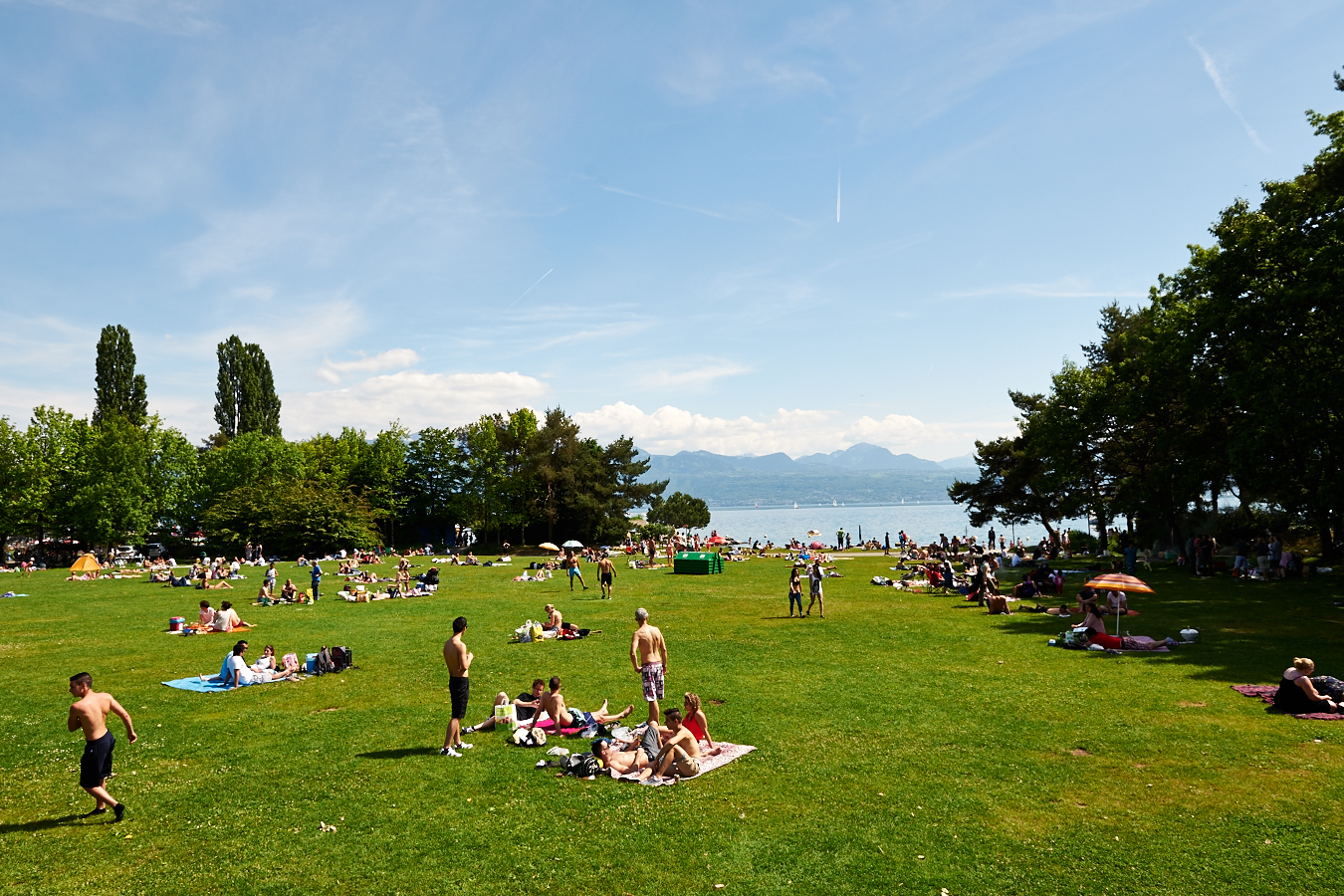
On a summer day

Vidy (French pronunciation: [vidi]) is an area of the city of Lausanne, Switzerland, on the shore of Lake Geneva (French: le Léman).

Since 1968, the headquarters of the International Olympic Committee have been at Vidy. The Olympic Museum and the Olympic Park (sculpture garden) are at Ouchy, to the east of Vidy.

== Gallery ==
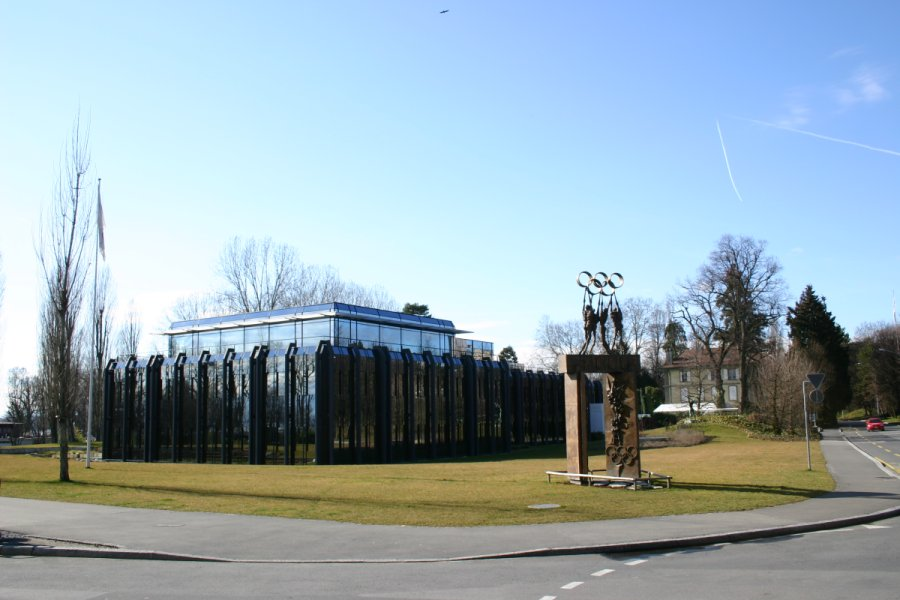
The headquarters of the International Olympic Committee

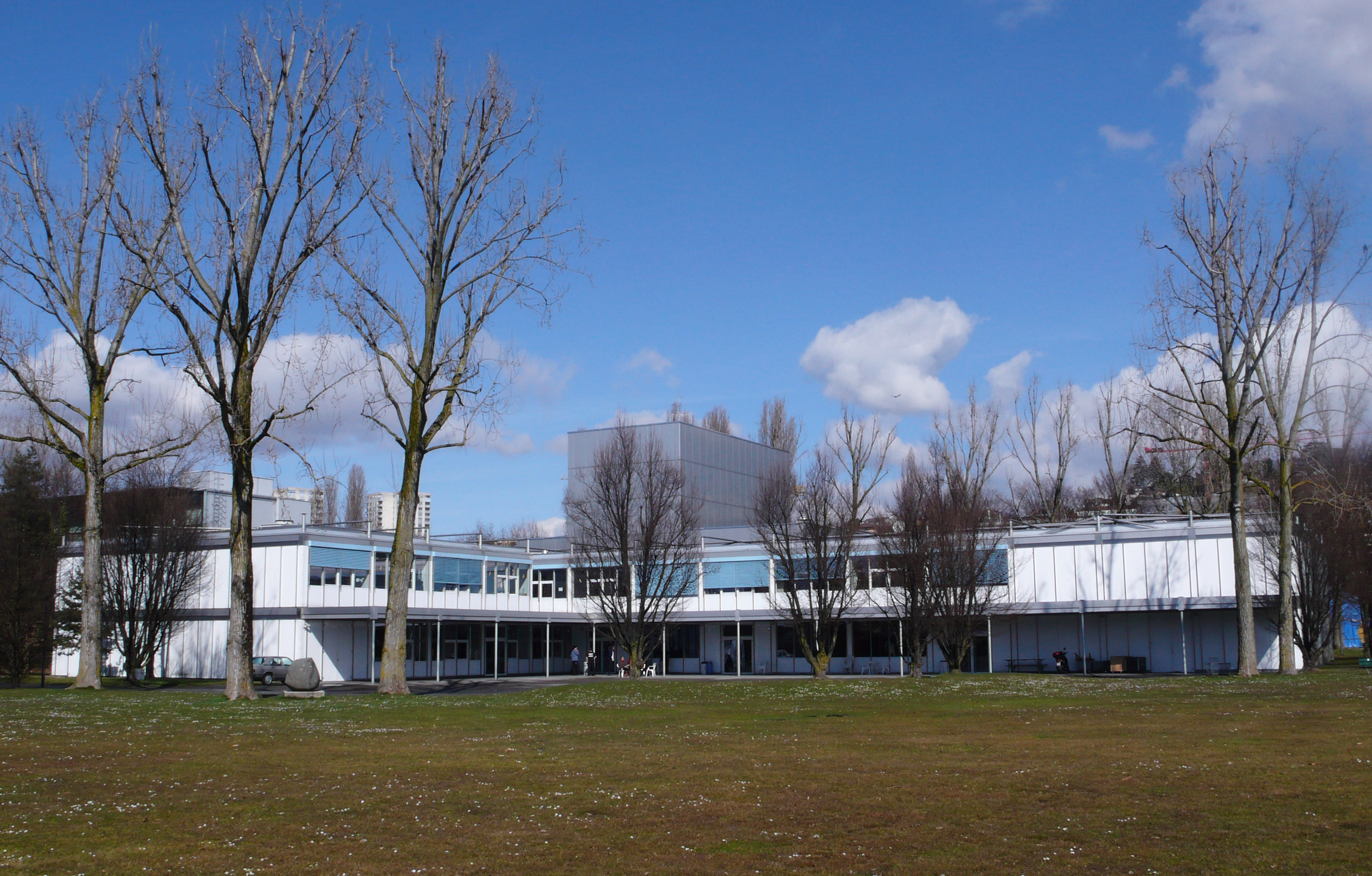
The Théâtre de Vidy

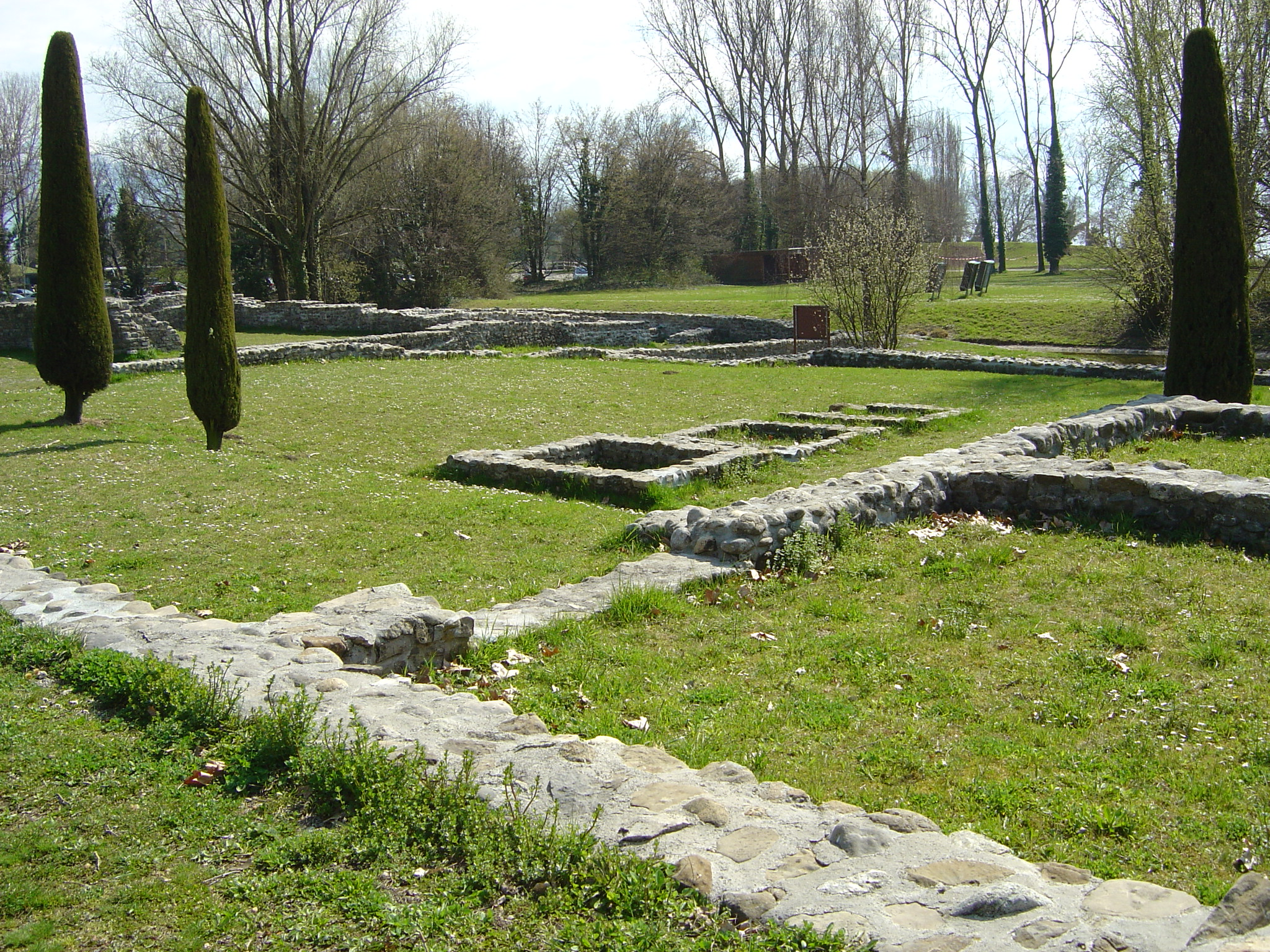
Roman ruins of Lousonna

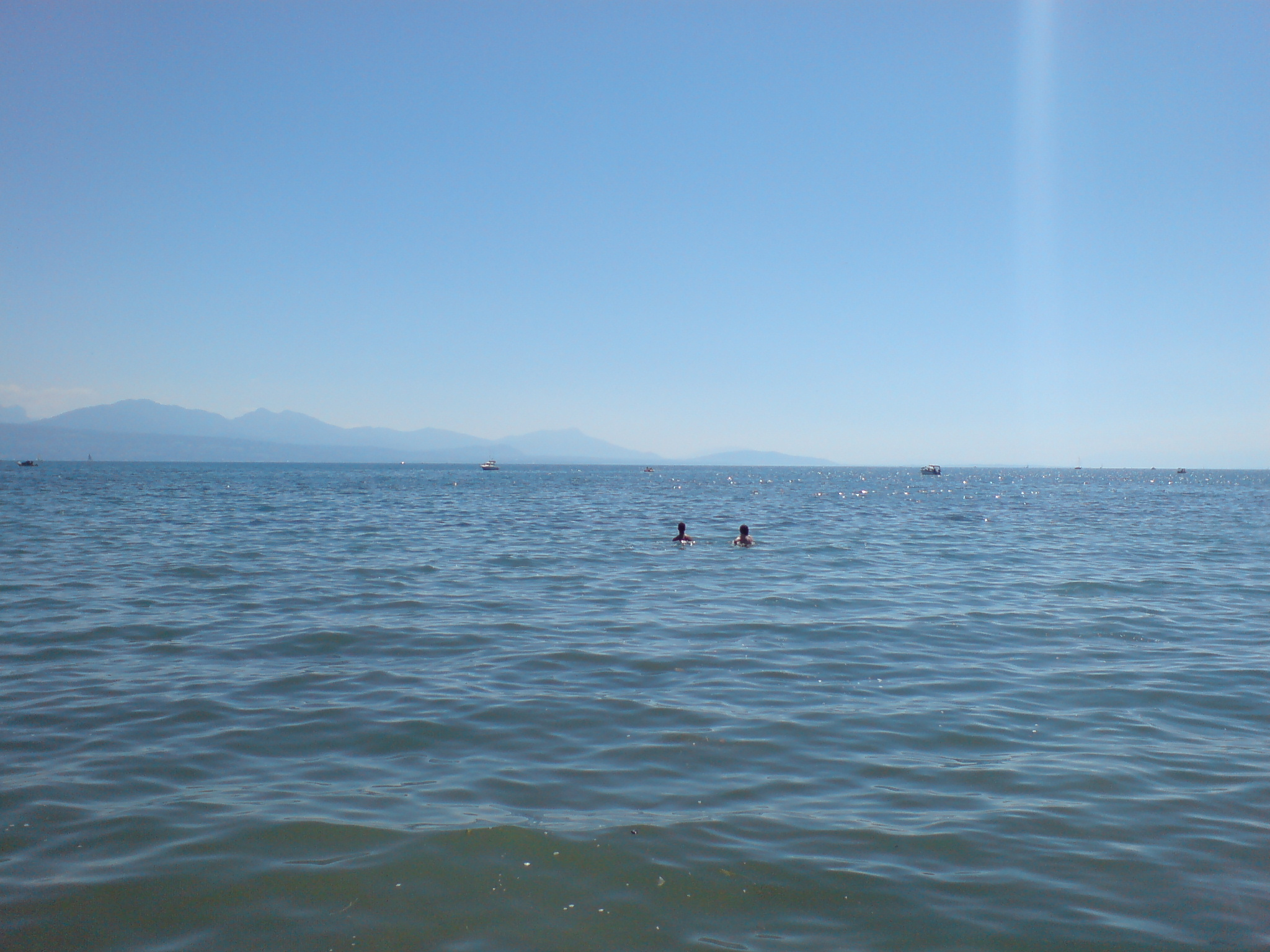
View from the beach at Vidy, on the shores of Lake Geneva

== See also ==
- International Olympic Committee
- Stade Pierre de Coubertin
