= 2025 World Mountain and Trail Running Championships =

- Dates: 25-28 September 2025
- Host city: Canfranc, Spain
- Level: Senior, Junior
- Type: Outdoor
- Events: 10 (men: 4; women: 4; U20 boys: 1; U20 girls: 1)

The 2025 World Mountain and Trail Running Championships (abbreviated WMTRC 2025) was the third World Mountain and Trail Running Championships held on 25-28 September in Canfranc, Spain, combining the World Mountain Running Championships and IAU Trail World Championships. The event was organised by the World Mountain Running Association, International Trail Running Association and International Association of Ultrarunners sanctioned by World Athletics.

== Men's events ==
Results for men's events:

Event	Gold		Silver		Bronze	
Vertical Uphill	Remi Bonnet; Switzerland	37:50	Richard Omaya Atuya; Kenya	39:04	Patrick Kipngeno; Kenya	39:20
Team uphill race	Kenya; Richard Omaya Atuya; Patrick Kipngeno; Philemon Ombogo Kiriago	22 pts	Switzerland; Rémi Bonnet; Jonathan Schmid; Dominik Rolli; Jonas Soldini	34 pts	United States; Christian Allen; Cam Smith; Tyler McCandless; Joseph Gray	41 pts
Short trail	Frédéric Tranchand; France	4:42:10	Manuel Merillas; Spain	4:45:33	Andreu Blanes; Spain	4:51:52
Team short trail	Spain; Manuel Merillas; Andreu Blanes; Alain Santamaría; Antonio Martínez Pérez; Nicolas Molina; Pablo Bautista	14:33:13	France; Frederic Tranchand; Sylvain Cachard; Johann Baujard; Pierre Galdbourdin; Thomas Butez	14:43:29	Italy; Luca Del Pero; Davide Magnini; Lorenzo Rota Martir; Lorenzo Beltrami; Daniel Pattis; Mattia Tanara	14:53:33
Long trail	Jim Walmsley; United States	8:35:11	Benjamin Roubiol; France	8:46:05	Louison Coiffet; France	8:46:05
Team long trail	France; Benjamin Roubiol; Louison Coiffet; Vincent Bouillard; Baptiste Chassagne; Mathieu Delpeuch; Robin Juillaguet	26:54:20	United States; Jim Walmsley; Adam Peterman; Zach Miller; Tracen Knopp; Tyler Green	27:37:48	Italy; Christian Minoggio; Francesco Puppi; Andreas Reiterer; Riccardo Montani; Gionata Cogliati	27:59:06
Mountain Classic	Ombogo Kiriano Philemon; Kenya	1:02:30	Martin Kiprotich; Uganda	1:03:14	Paul Machoka; Kenya	1:03:25
Team Mountain Classic	Kenya; Philemon Ombogo Kiriago; Paul Machoka; Ken Koros; Michael Selelo	9 pts	Uganda; Martin Kiprotich; Aziz Chebet; Isaac Masai	27 pts	Italy; Isacco Costa; Cesare Maestri; Lorenzo Cagnati; Luca Merli	37 pts
U20 Mountain Classic	Titus Musau; Uganda	33:09	Enos Chebet; Uganda	33:26	Abraham Cherotich; Uganda	33:32
Team U20 Mountain Classic	Uganda; Titus Musau; Enos Chebet; Abraham Cherotich	6 pts	United Kingdom; Jack Sanderson; Sam Bentham; Ewan Busfield; Rowan Taylor	29 pts	Switzerland; Matthieu Bührer; Loïc Berger; Loric Bucklin; Jonas Oliva	34 pts

== Women's events ==
Results for women's events:

Event	Gold		Silver		Bronze	
Vertical Uphill	Nina Engelhard; Germany	45:33	Susanna Saapunki; Finland	45:59	Anna Gibson; United States	46:07
Team uphill race	Italy; Francesca Ghelfi; Lucia Arnoldo; Benedetta Broggi; Martina Falchetti	31 pts	France; Christel Dewalle; Nélie Clément; Marie Nivet; Celine Jeannier	36 pts	Canada; Emma Cook-Clarke; Jade Belzberg; Anne-Marie Comeau; Elisa Morin	36 pts
Short trail	Tove Alexandersson; Sweden	5:04:20	Sara Alonso; Spain	5:38:14	Naomi Lang; Great Britain	5:38:54
Team short trail	Sweden; Tove Alexandersson; Johanna Gelfgren; Amanda Nilsson; Barbro Fjällstedt Oljans	17:14:42	Spain; Sara Alonso; Ikram Rharsalla; Patricia Pineda; Maria Fuentes; Oihana Cortazar	17:29:04	France; Clementine Geoffray; Olivia Magnone; Adeline Martin; Emilie Menuet	17:55:55
Long trail	Katie Schide; United States	9:57:59	Sunmaya Budha; Nepal	10:23:03	Fabiola Conti; Italy	10:35:51
Team long trail	Italy; Fabiola Conti; Martina Valmassoi; Giuditta Turini; Irene Saggin; Martina Chialvo	32:36:17	United States; Katie Schide; Shea Aquilano; Allison Baca; Emily Schmitz; Klaire Rhodes; Hillary Allen	32:55:19	France; Anne Lise Rousset; Marion Delespierre; Hillary Gerardi; Jennifer Lemoine; Anne-Cecile Thevenot	32:59:06
Mountain Classic	Nina Engelhard; Germany	1:11:00	Ruth Gitonga Mwihaki; Kenya	1:12:54	Oria Liaci; Switzerland	1:13:15
Team Mountain Classic	Kenya; Ruth Gitonga Mwihaki; Joyce Muthoni; Gloria Chebet; Valentine Repkoech Rutto	14 pts	United States; Lauren Gregory; Anna Gibson; Courtney Coppinger; Allie McLaughlin	32 pts	Switzerland; Oria Liaci; Axelle Genoud; Céline Aebi; Flavia van der Zon-Stutz	35 pts
U20 Mountain Classic	Julia Ehrle; Germany	38:47	Nancy Chepkwurui; Uganda	39:24	Felister Chekwemoi; Uganda	39:29
Team U20 Mountain Classic	Uganda; Nancy Chepkwurui; Felister Chekwemoi; Nowel Cheruto; Andronicas Chebet	14 pts	Italy; Licia Ferrari; Martina Ghisalberti; Alice Rosa Brusin; Camilla Bonariva	35 pts	Spain; Ines Herault; Laura Ordiales; Nadia Soto; Mar Espartero	40 pts

== Full Results ==
=== 2025 World Mountain Running Championships Vertical Uphill Men's Results ===
Distance 6.4 km, difference in height 985 m.

Rank	Name	Nationality	Time
1st place, gold medalist(s)	Rémi Bonnet	Switzerland	37:50
2nd place, silver medalist(s)	Richard Omaya Atuya	Kenya	39:04
3rd place, bronze medalist(s)	Patrick Kipngeno	Kenya	39:20
4	Christian Allen	United States	39:28
5	Jacob Adkin	United Kingdom	39:34
6	Eliud Cherop	Uganda	40:09
7	Jonatha Camilo Castillo	Colombia	40:16
8	Andrea Elia	Italy	40:20
9	Quentin Meyleu	France	40:20
10	Theodore Klein	France	40:24
11	Cam Smith	United States	40:30
12	Brayan Rodriguez	Mexico	40:31
13	Jonathan Schmid	Switzerland	40:55
14	Alain Santamaria	Spain	41:00
15	Tobias Ulbrich	Germany	41:16
16	Alexandre Ricard	Canada	41:27
17	Ombogo Kiriago Philemon	Kenya	41:35
18	Per Christian Færøvik Grieg	Norway	41:36
19	Klemen Španring	Norway	41:37
20	Dominik Rolli	Norway	41:37
21	Jonas Soldini	Switzerland	41:38
22	Deogracius Musobo	Uganda	41:47
23	Remi Leroux	Canada	41:49
24	Matthew Knowles	United Kingdom	41:54
25	Julius Ott	Germany	41:58
26	Tyler McCandless	United States	41:59
27	Daniel Izquierdo	Spain	42:00
28	Emmanuel Meyssat	France	42:00
29	Alejandro García	Spain	42:00
30	Andrea Rostan	Italy	42:18
31	Máté Dalos	Hungary	42:33
32	Mathieu Le Fur	France	42:47
33	Johannes Nussbaumer	Austria	42:53
34	Joseph Gray	United States	42:56
35	Maximilian Meusburger	Austria	43:05
36	Nicolas Herrera	Colombia	43:09
37	Jeppe Aaskov Pallesen	Denmark	43:11
38	Josef Bodner	Austria	43:15
39	Kane Reilly	South Africa	43:27
40	Dominik Notz	Germany	43:29
41	Pablo Van Hoorn	Netherlands	43:37
42	Mande Isaac Kibet	Uganda	43:44
43	Hans-Peter Innerhofer	Austria	43:47
44	Zak Hanna	Ireland	43:48
45	Bryam Patricio Sari	Ecuador	43:56
46	Finlay Grant	United Kingdom	44:01
47	Oscar Subuh-Symons	United Kingdom	44:05
48	Alex Kiplangat	Uganda	44:07
49	Marcelo Gonçalves	Portugal	44:08
50	Xavier Chevrier	Italy	44:10
51	Tiziano Moia	Italy	44:34
52	Daniel Heschuk	Canada	44:39
53	Max Napoleon Rohoden Jaramillo	Ecuador	44:50
54	Michael Kernahan	Australia	44:52
55	Daniel Dukstad	Norway	44:55
56	Michał Olejnik	Poland	44:58
57	Toby Batchelor	New Zealand	45:05
58	Gabriel Wimmer	Germany	45:26
59	Sándor Szabó	Hungary	45:30
60	Andrej Paulen	Slovakia	45:35
61	Jordan Guenette	Canada	45:47
62	Esteban Izquierdo	Colombia	45:51
63	Nathan Pearce	Australia	45:52
64	Óscar Basantes	Ecuador	46:05
65	Rares Imre Miklos	Romania	46:15
66	Cristian Rincon	Colombia	46:17
67	Matthew Mcconnell	Ireland	46:27
68	Aaron Mcgrady	Ireland	46:30
69	Rui Muga	Portugal	46:31
70	Allison Rocha	Brazil	46:34
71	Adrien Karim Chouchou	Algeria	46:40
72	Juan Ignacio Redolatti	Argentina	46:45
73	Paulo Gomes	Portugal	46:46
74	Ruben Sansom	Netherlands	46:47
75	Jan Torrella	Spain	46:49
76	Ricardo Soares Fonseca	Portugal	47:04
77	Diego Ignacio Diaz	Chile	47:06
78	Fraser Darcy	Australia	47:12
79	Gastón Nicolás Cambareri	Argentina	47:21
80	Nikola Špoljar	Croatia	47:33
81	Maj Pritržnik	Slovenia	47:42
82	Javier Adolfo Carriqueo	Argentina	47:54
83	José Jorge Ubico Koose	Guatemala	47:56
84	Jared Martin	Ireland	47:58
85	William Weynand	Belgium	48:02
86	Felipe Collazo	Argentina	48:06
87	Collin Van Almkerk	Netherlands	48:41
88	Ante Živković	Croatia	48:50
89	Uldis Upītis	Latvia	49:04
90	Ivan Dračar	Croatia	49:07
91	Balázs Pernyész	Hungary	49:15
92	Elias Hinge Krogsgaard	Denmark	49:20
93	Alvaro Mauricio Carranza Olivo	Ecuador	49:28
94	Luuk Wijering	Netherlands	49:40
95	Dušan Krstić	Serbia	49:44
96	Aleksa Banković	Serbia	49:54
97	Kristijan Rubinić	Croatia	50:06
98	Iain Best	Australia	50:18
99	Jeferson Pinheiro	Brazil	50:26
100	Wai Ching Soh	Malaysia	50:28
101	Zoltán Vigh	Hungary	50:28
102	Kevinas Olišauskis	Lithuania	50:43
103	Dougal Henry Cooke Shepherd	New Zealand	51:08
104	Marco Francioni	San Marino	51:20
105	Aidan Tanti	Malta	52:01
106	Min Xiang Lee	Malaysia	52:15
107	Martynas Rimkevičius	Lithuania	52:28
108	Yusri Nanda	Indonesia	52:49
109	Donatas Jocius	Lithuania	53:26
110	William Ricardo Aveiro	Paraguay	53:34
111	Kristaps Bērziņš	Latvia	54:13
112	David Borg	Malta	54:29
113	Tommy Wallbank	Malta	54:49
114	Yen-Ching Chiang	Chinese Taipei	54:52
115	Stefano Benvenuti	San Marino	55:55
116	Isaac Attard	Malta	56:06
117	Hsin-Kai Su	Chinese Taipei	56:47
118	Aurimas Brazauskas	Lithuania	57:22
119	Chester Cheong	Singapore	58:23
120	Luca Censoni	San Marino	58:28
121	Oleksii Babii	Ukraine	58:46
122	Huai-Chieh Liu	Chinese Taipei	58:46
123	Jiong How Lua	Singapore	1:01:13
124	Elmir Askarov	Azerbaijan	1:01:59
125	Hung-Yu Huang	Chinese Taipei	1:03:05
126	Ahmad Aqwa Bin Othman	Malaysia	1:05:13
127	Ammarith Ann	Cambodia	1:06:30
128	Jean Jacques Mok	Cambodia	1:11:22
129	Farrell Tes	Cambodia	1:12:53
130	Henry Yee Meng Yang	Singapore	1:15:18
131	Jean Luc Puong	Cambodia	1:18:24
132	Jason Heng Yap Lim	Singapore	1:28:11

=== 2025 World Mountain Running Championships Vertical Uphill Men's Team Standings ===
Rank	Country	Racers	Score
1st place, gold medalist(s)	Kenya	2 Richard Omaya Atuya; 3 Patrick Kipngeno; 17 Ombogo Kiriago Philemon	22 pts
2nd place, silver medalist(s)	Switzerland	1 Rémi Bonnet; 13 Jonathan Schmid; 20 Dominik Rolli	34 pts
3rd place, bronze medalist(s)	United States	4 Christian Allen; 11 Cam Smith; 26 Tyler McCandless	41 pts
4.	France	9 Quentin Meyleu; 10 Theodore Klein; 28 Emmanuel Meyssat	47 pts
5.	Spain	14 Alain Santamaria; 27 Daniel Izquierdo; 29 Alejandro García	70 pts
6.	Uganda	6 Eliud Cherop; 22 Deogracius Musobo; 42 Mande Isaac Kibet	70 pts
7.	United Kingdom	5 Jacob Adkin; 24 Matthew Knowles; 46 Finlay Grant	75 pts
8.	Germany	15 Tobias Ulbrich; 25 Julius Ott; 40 Dominik Notz	80 pts
9.	Italy	8 Andrea Elia; 30 Andrea Rostan; 50 Xavier Chevrier	88 pts
10.	Canada	16 Alexandre Ricard; 23 Remi Leroux; 52 Daniel Heschuk	91 pts
11.	Colombia	7 Jonatha Camilo Castillo; 36 Nicolas Herrera; 62 Esteban Izquierdo	105 pts
12.	Austria	33 Johannes Nussbaumer; 35 Maximilian Meusburger; 38 Josef Bodner	106 pts
13.	Ecuador	45 Bryam Patricio Sari; 53 Max Napoleon Rohoden Jaramillo; 64 Óscar Basantes	162 pts
14.	Ireland	44 Zak Hanna; 67 Matthew Mcconnell; 68 Aaron Mcgrady	179 pts
15.	Hungary	31 Máté Dalos; 59 Sándor Szabó; 91 Balázs Pernyész	181 pts
16.	Portugal	49 Marcelo Gonçalves; 69 Rui Muga; 73 Paulo Gomes	191 pts
17.	Australia	54 Michael Kernahan; 63 Nathan Pearce; 78 Fraser Darcy	195 pts
18.	Netherlands	41 Pablo Van Hoorn; 74 Ruben Sansom; 87 Collin Van Almkerk	202 pts
19.	Argentina	72 Juan Ignacio Redolatti; 79 Gastón Nicolás Cambareri; 82 Javier Adolfo Carriqueo	233 pts
20.	Croatia	80 Nikola Špoljar; 88 Ante Živković; 90 Ivan Dračar	258 pts
21.	Lithuania	102 Kevinas Olišauskis; 107 Martynas Rimkevičius; 109 Donatas Jocius	318 pts
22.	Malta	105 Aidan Tanti; 112 David Borg; 113 Tommy Wallbank	330 pts
23.	Malaysia	100 Wai Ching Soh; 106 Min Xiang Lee; 126 Ahmad Aqwa Bin Othman	332 pts
24.	San Marino	104 Marco Francioni; 115 Stefano Benvenuti; 120 Luca Censoni	339 pts
25.	Chinese Taipei	114 Yen-Ching Chiang; 117 Hsin-Kai Su; 122 Huai-Chieh Liu	353 pts
26.	Singapore	119 Chester Cheong; 123 Jiong How Lua; 130 Henry Yee Meng Yang	372 pts
27.	Cambodia	127 Ammarith Ann; 128 Jean Jacques Mok; 129 Farrell Tes	384 pts

=== 2025 World Mountain Running Championships Vertical Uphill Women's Results ===
Distance 6.4 km, difference in height 985 m.

Rank	Name	Nationality	Time
1st place, gold medalist(s)	Nina Engelhard	Germany	45:33
2nd place, silver medalist(s)	Susanna Saapunki	Finland	45:59
3rd place, bronze medalist(s)	Anna Gibson	United States	46:07
4	Martha Chemutai	Uganda	46:44
5	Francesca Ghelfi	Italy	47:13
6	Christel Dewalle	France	47:16
7	Lucia Arnoldo	Italy	47:32
8	Nélie Clément	France	47:40
9	Laura Hottenrott	Germany	47:43
10	Emma Cook-Clarke	Canada	48:07
11	Ginary Camargo	Colombia	48:15
12	Kirsty Skye Dickson	United Kingdom	48:23
13	Jade Belzberg	Canada	48:31
14	Philaries Jeruto Kisang	Kenya	48:35
15	Scout Adkin	United Kingdom	48:43
16	Maude Mathys	Switzerland	48:52
17	Oria Liacio	Switzerland	49:04
18	Anne-Marie Comeau	Canada	49:24
19	Benedetta Broggi	Italy	49:30
20	Cristina Simion	Romania	49:42
21	Selina Burch	Switzerland	49:56
22	Marie Nivet	France	50:06
23	Militsa Mircheva	Bulgaria	50:19
24	Martina Falchetti	Italy	50:33
25	Elisa Morin	Canada	50:48
26	Naiara Irigoyen	Spain	51:01
27	Weronika Matuszczak	Poland	51:13
28	Celine Jeannier	France	51:14
29	Hillary Allen	United States	51:16
30	Kereen Chemusto	Uganda	51:34
31	Sydney Petersen	United States	51:36
32	Angelina Chelimo	Uganda	51:50
33	Rebecca Cherop	Uganda	51:54
34	Laia Montoya	Spain	51:55
35	Jessica Brazeau	United States	52:05
36	Madlen Kappeler	Germany	52:09
37	Isabel Calero	Spain	52:12
38	Ruth Jones	United Kingdom	52:17
39	Eden O'Dea	United Kingdom	52:24
40	Joanna Soares	Portugal	52:45
41	Sarah McCormack	Ireland	52:47
42	Lara Hamilton	Australia	52:55
43	Louise Jernberg	Sweden	52:57
44	Amelie Muss	Austria	52:59
45	Tea Faber	Croatia	53:28
46	Slađana Zagorac	Serbia	54:02
47	Katarína Pejpkova	Slovakia	54:10
48	Rens Nijman	Netherlands	54:14
49	Maia Flint	New Zealand	54:16
50	Anja Mikuž	Slovenia	54:25
51	Agnes Josefsson	Sweden	54:45
52	Jessie Speedy	New Zealand	54:55
53	Nuša Mali	Slovenia	54:55
54	Mirriam Chepkirui	Kenya	54:56
55	Anita Lilleskare	Norway	55:02
56	Jessica Ronan	Australia	55:09
57	Florencia Vásquez	Chile	55:12
58	Kitti Posztós	Hungary	55:14
59	Agnes Nørgård Kracht	Denmark	55:21
60	Aina Scherling	Switzerland	55:29
61	Charlotte Cotton	Belgium	55:29
62	Yeni Paola Morales Pulido	Colombia	55:32
63	Viviana Carolina Rios Cedillo	Ecuador	55:38
64	Lisa Hegarty	Ireland	56:03
65	Emily Greve Somerset	Denmark	56:12
66	Camila Cioffi	Argentina	56:21
67	Kate McDonald	Ireland	56:25
68	Grace McConnochie	New Zealand	56:41
69	Pia Carayol Bressan	Argentina	56:59
70	Edel Monaghan	Ireland	57:44
71	Cátia Santos Leitão	Portugal	59:01
72	Mirian Esperanza Puin	Ecuador	59:12
73	Maria Belen Sanchez Ruiz	Argentina	59:33
74	Marisa Cortright	Croatia	59:38
75	Veronica Galvan	Argentina	59:51
76	Laureen Teixeira	Portugal	59:56
77	Rozelene Rodrigues Padilha	Brazil	1:00:02
78	Sandra Šrut	Croatia	1:00:10
79	Alejandra Perez	Ecuador	1:00:22
80	Olha Pylypiv	Ukraine	1:00:23
81	Onditz Iturbe	Spain	1:00:24
82	Cátia Magalhães Mendes	Portugal	1:01:02
83	Antonia Sanchez Lagos	Chile	1:02:16
84	Mirjana Šimek Bilić	Croatia	1:02:29
85	Sthéfanny Reus Borges	Brazil	1:02:39
86	Tanya Miley Pacheco Labrador	Venezuela	1:02:53
87	Lilla Jánosi	Hungary	1:03:00
88	Emily Bartlett	Australia	1:03:23
89	Júlia Tüttő	Hungary	1:03:38
90	Anna Herczog	Hungary	1:04:16
91	Daina Stonka	Latvia	1:04:52
92	Gabriela Rossato Compassi	Brazil	1:05:55
93	Marta Meiere	Latvia	1:06:57
94	Laurie Phai	Cambodia	1:07:59
95	Yudith Castillo	Venezuela	1:08:33
96	Jou Cheng	Chinese Taipei	1:09:55
97	Yi-Chun Huang	Chinese Taipei	1:11:27
98	Pei Xun Woo	Singapore	1:11:32
99	An Qi Lim	Singapore	1:11:47
100	Yumei Chan	Singapore	1:12:32
101	Ching Tseng	Chinese Taipei	1:12:53
102	Ai-Chuan Lin	Chinese Taipei	1:13:54
103	Krystal Khaw Lai Phing	Malaysia	1:15:34
104	Izzah Hazirah Binti Abdul Malek	Malaysia	1:16:08
105	Xiaoyun Zeng	Singapore	1:16:29
106	Aleksandra Mijanović	Serbia	1:19:37
107	Anita Bonini	San Marino	1:25:55

=== 2025 World Mountain Running Championships Vertical Uphill Women's Team Results ===
Rank	Country	Racers	Score
1st place, gold medalist(s)	Italy	5 Francesca Ghelfi; 7 Lucia Arnoldo; 19 Benedetta Broggi	31 pts
2nd place, silver medalist(s)	France	6 Christel Dewalle; 8 Nélie Clément; 22 Marie Nivet	36 pts
3rd place, bronze medalist(s)	Canada	10 Emma Cook-Clarke; 13 Jade Belzberg; 18 Anne-Marie Comeau	41 pts
4.	Germany	1 Nina Engelhard; 9 Laura Hottenrott; 36 Madlen Kappeler	46 pts
5.	Switzerland	16 Maude Mathys; 17 Oria Liaci; 21 Selina Burch	54 pts
6.	United States	3 Anna Gibson; 29 Hillary Allen; 31 Sydney Petersen	63 pts
7.	United Kingdom	12 Kirsty Skye Dickson; 15 Scout Adkin; 38 Ruth Jones	65 pts
8.	Uganda	4 Martha Chemutai; 30 Kereen Chemusto; 32 Angeline Chelimo	66 pts
9.	Spain	26 Naiara Irigoyen; 34 Laia Montoya; 37 Isabel Calero	97 pts
10.	New Zealand	49 Maia Flint; 52 Jessie Speedy; 68 Grace Mcconnochie	169 pts
11.	Ireland	41 Sarah Mccormack; 64 Lisa Hegarty; 67 Kate McDonald	172 pts
12.	Australia	42 Lara Hamilton; 56 Jessica Ronan; 88 Emily Bartlett	186 pts
13.	Portugal	40 Joana Soares; 71 Cátia Santos Leitão; 76 Laureen Teixeira	187 pts
14.	Croatia	45 Tea Faber; 74 Marisa Cortright; 78 Sandra Šrut	197 pts
15.	Argentina	66 Camila Cioffi; 69 Pia Carayol Bressan; 73 Maria Belen Sanchez Ruiz	208 pts
16.	Ecuador	63 Viviana Carolina Rios Cedillo; 72 Mirian Esperanza Puin; 79 Alejandra Perez	214 pts
17.	Hungary	58 Kitti Posztós; 87 Lilla Jánosi; 89 Júlia Tüttő	234 pts
18.	Brazil	77 Rozelene Rodrigues Padilha; 85 Sthéfanny Reus Borges; 92 Gabriela Rossato Compassi	254 pts
19.	Chinese Taipei	96 Jou Cheng; 97 Yi-Chun Huang; 101 Ching Tseng	294 pts
20.	Singapore	98 Pei Xun Woo; 99 An Qi Lim; 100 Yumei Chan	297 pts

=== 2025 World Mountain Running Championships Short Trail Men's Results ===
Distance 44.5km, total ascent of 3,660 m, total descent of 3,660 m.

Rank	Name	Nationality	Time
1st place, gold medalist(s)	Frédéric Tranchand	France	4:42:10
2nd place, silver medalist(s)	Manuel Merillas	Spain	4:45:33
3rd place, bronze medalist(s)	Andreu Blanes	Spain	4:51:52
4	Alain Santamaria	Spain	4:55:48
5	Marcin Kubica	Poland	4:56:38
6	Luca Del Pero	Italy	4:56:57
7	Martin Nilsson	Sweden	4:57:09
8	Davide Magnini	Italy	4:57:42
9	Sylvain Cachard	France	4:58:23
10	Lorenzo Rota Martir	Italy	4:58:54
11	Roberto Delorenzi	Switzerland	4:58:57
12	Lorenzo Beltrami	Italy	5:00:40
13	Antonio Martinez	Spain	5:01:49
14	Noah Williams	United States	5:02:42
15	Daniel Pattis	Italy	5:02:46
16	Johann Baujard	France	5:02:56
17	Ryunosuke Omi	Japan	5:04:36
18	Eli Hemming	United States	5:05:13
19	David Sinclair	United States	5:08:40
20	Nicolas Molina	Spain	5:09:53
21	Jonathan Schmid	Switzerland	5:14:02
22	Pierre Galdbourdin	France	5:14:36
23	Dominik Tabor	Poland	5:18:39
24	Hugo César Rodriguez	Argentina	5:19:53
25	Anders Haga	Norway	5:20:38
26	Jackson Robert Cole	New Zealand	5:23:13
27	Benjamin Rothery	United Kingdom	5:23:15
28	Marcel Fabian	Poland	5:24:06
29	Josip Meštrić	Croatia	5:24:29
30	Mattia Tanara	Italy	5:24:57
31	Francesco Ceschi	Switzerland	5:25:54
32	Seth Ruhling	United States	5:27:04
33	Aasmund Kjøllmoen Steien	Norway	5:28:10
34	Tine Žižmond	Slovenia	5:28:24
35	Vasileios Balamotis	Greece	5:28:27
36	Moritz Auf Der Heide	Germany	5:28:46
37	Sindre Buraas	Norway	5:29:38
38	Jonas Hesthaug	Norway	5:29:45
39	Tencho Zhekov	Bulgaria	5:29:52
40	Thomas Butez	France	5:30:54
41	Adrian Berto Gaspar	Argentina	5:31:10
42	Weston Hill	New Zealand	5:31:27
43	Hajime Kasagi	Japan	5:31:46
44	Krzysztof Bodurka	Poland	5:31:47
45	Linus Hultegård	Sweden	5:32:49
46	Ruy Ueda	Japan	5:33:03
47	Rui Teixeira	Portugal	5:33:53
48	Marc Dürr	Germany	5:34:01
49	Joshua Potvin	Canada	5:34:04
50	Bruno Silva	Portugal	5:34:44
51	Bertie Houghton	United Kingdom	5:35:27
52	Diego Cardozo	Uruguay	5:35:35
53	Dorian Marchal	Switzerland	5:35:55
54	Javier Fernando Mariqueo	Argentina	5:36:01
55	Pablo Bautista	Spain	5:36:02
56	Romnick Tongkaling	Philippines	5:37:11
57	Thorsteinn Roy Jóhannsson	Iceland	5:37:23
58	Olle Kalered	Sweden	5:37:59
59	Sam Hendry	Canada	5:38:44
60	Edson Jair Mejia Casallas	Colombia	5:39:05
61	Grant Cunliffe	United Kingdom	5:39:06
62	Eric Stipić	Croatia	5:39:16
63	Georgi Zhekov	Bulgaria	5:40:28
64	Rafał Matuszczak	Poland	5:40:38
65	Diego Ramón Simon	Argentina	5:41:02
66	Juan Pablo Llanos	Chile	5:41:15
67	Matías Barros	Chile	5:43:48
68	Eder Belmont	Mexico	5:44:38
69	Randolf Gonzales	Philippines	5:45:19
70	John Luna Lima	Brazil	5:46:39
71	Máté Dávid Vásárhelyi	Hungary	5:47:01
72	Yordan Todorov	Bulgaria	5:48:03
73	Eliseo Joaquin Narvaez	Argentina	5:49:22
74	Edgars Daugulis	Latvia	5:49:28
75	Thijs De Lange	Netherlands	5:50:12
76	Rogério Silvestrim	Brazil	5:50:43
77	Zyade Chouiekh	Algeria	5:51:39
78	Wilmern Antonio Araujo Betancourt	Venezuela	5:51:45
79	Alexandre Ricard	Canada	5:52:04
80	Adrien Karim Chouchou	Algeria	5:52:13
81	Michelino Sunseri	United States	5:53:11
82	Diederick Calkoen	Netherlands	5:54:08
83	Ignacio Samuel Reyes	Argentina	5:54:12
84	Marc Fawcett-Atkinson	Canada	5:55:04
85	Blake Turner	Australia	5:55:09
86	João Ferreira	Portugal	5:55:18
87	Nuno Campos	Portugal	5:55:21
88	Benjamin Gys	Belgium	5:55:56
89	Vladislav Ixel	Australia	5:56:20
90	Max Boderskov	Denmark	5:56:38
91	Joseph Wright	United Kingdom	5:56:52
92	David Zebedee Haunschmidt	New Zealand	5:56:58
93	Enda Cloake	Ireland	5:59:17
94	Kārlis Eiduks	Latvia	5:59:53
95	Koken Ogasawara	Japan	6:00:27
96	Max King	United States	6:00:34
97	Eli Nixon	Bermuda	6:00:50
98	Jack Abbott Harris	New Zealand	6:01:31
99	Johannes Ostfalk	Germany	6:04:23
100	Anders Aagaard Hansen	Denmark	6:05:13
101	Rodrigo Lara Molina	Chile	6:05:37
102	Dominik Milewski	Poland	6:06:03
103	Halldór Hermann Jónsson	Iceland	6:06:13
104	Matthijs Karels	Netherlands	6:07:20
105	John Kinsella	Ireland	6:09:45
106	Tiago Vieira	Portugal	6:10:07
107	Csoban Csaba Balogh	Hungary	6:10:56
108	Sándor Szabó	Hungary	6:10:57
109	Tadej Serdinšek	Slovenia	6:12:47
110	Maikol Mendez	Uruguay	6:12:52
111	Ryan Stacy Carr	New Zealand	6:13:25
112	Kevin Stroek	Netherlands	6:13:27
113	Francisco Marin Zuniga	Chile	6:13:43
114	Roberth Paul Guachamin Raimundo	Ecuador	6:13:48
115	Gretar Orn Gudmundsson	Iceland	6:13:51
116	Nikolaj Brandt Blæsild	Denmark	6:14:22
117	Domantas Kavaliauskas	Lithuania	6:17:35
118	Marko Gorički	Croatia	6:19:25
119	Klever Villacres	Ecuador	6:23:20
120	Chih-Yuan Chang	Chinese Taipei	6:24:44
121	John Ray Onifa	Philippines	6:26:03
122	Valdas Rubel	Lithuania	6:28:50
123	S Supriatna	Indonesia	6:29:23
124	Luke Weldon	Ireland	6:30:23
125	Diego Armando Vera	Colombia	6:31:23
126	Sacha George Clement Lagesse	Mauritius	6:32:26
127	Ayslan Miragaia	Brazil	6:32:57
128	Khalid Chebab	Algeria	6:34:23
129	Jānis Kūms	Latvia	6:38:44
130	Ho Chung Wong	Hong Kong	6:39:14
131	Sammy Rotich Chelangat	Kenya	6:39:57
132	Gavin Byrne	Ireland	6:41:12
133	Chun Kit Tsang	Hong Kong	6:44:34
134	Jorge Ezequiel Torres Montero	Cuba	6:47:31
135	Andris Ronimoiss	Latvia	6:47:42
136	Kieren Dsouza	India	6:48:41
137	Elkin Yesid Quintana	Colombia	6:48:53
138	Stefán Pálsson	Iceland	6:50:50
139	Ryan Lenferna De La Motte	Mauritius	6:51:05
140	Ihor Sliusarenko	Ukraine	6:52:17
141	Matija Lisec	Croatia	6:54:33
142	Alex Cevallos	Ecuador	6:56:42
143	Aleksandar Vukmirović	Serbia	6:58:27
144	Brian Francois Fils	Mauritius	7:00:25
145	Roman Danylyshyn	Ukraine	7:03:00
146	Laurynas Remeika	Lithuania	7:04:31
147	Nemanja Rašković	Serbia	7:05:04
148	Andrius Šipkinas	Lithuania	7:11:12
149	Joseph Jean Damien Ravina	Mauritius	7:12:11
150	Yusri Nanda	Indonesia	7:12:41
151	Min Xiang Lee	Malaysia	7:16:16
152	Dwight Grieve	New Zealand	7:16:57
153	Yu-Jian Jiang	Chinese Taipei	7:18:08
154	Zhi-Kai Wu	Chinese Taipei	7:19:35
155	Tai-Wei Chang	Chinese Taipei	7:21:26
156	Lok Yin Lo	Hong Kong	7:21:27
157	Billy Curtis	Australia	7:26:04
158	Lorenzo Righi	San Marino	7:32:55
159	Mateo Ledinski	Croatia	7:32:59
160	Kyuhwan Lee	South Korea	7:34:30
161	Daniel Yap Chun Mun	Malaysia	7:34:36
162	Karl Midlane	Zambia	7:34:47
163	Liraud Flore	Mauritius	7:35:25
164	Valerio Rotela López	Paraguay	7:45:47
165	Hung-Yi Ko	Chinese Taipei	7:47:29
166	Fong Meng Lao	Macau	7:49:15
167	Daouda Diame	Senegal	7:54:35
168	Hemza Mana	Algeria	7:58:16
169	Jing Yan Chew	Singapore	7:58:19
170	Mohamad Shamsul Kamal	Malaysia	7:58:24
171	Willam Flores	Bolivia	8:07:16
	Žan Žepič	Slovenia	DNF
	Suyong Kim	South Korea	DNF
	Juho Ylinen	Finland	DNF
	Thomas Cardin	France	DNF
	Gustavo Adolfo Buitrago	Colombia	DNF
	Anders Johnny Kjærevik	Norway	DNF
	Jian Xing Lin	Singapore	DNF
	Dany Racine	Canada	DNF
	Thomas Roach	United Kingdom	DNF
	Kristian Jones	United Kingdom	DNF
	Einari Heinaro	Finland	DNF
	Francisco Corona	Mexico	DNF
	Victor Kwemboi	Uganda	DNF
	Juha Sorvisto	Finland	DNF
	Stian Hovind Angermund	Norway	DNF
	Tuomas Kari	Finland	DNF
	Vít Pavlišta	Czech Republic	DNF
	Elmir Askarov	Azerbaijan	DNF
	Kostyantyn Zhelezov	Ukraine	DNF
	Michele Rastelli	San Marino	DNF
	Roberto Pazzaglia	San Marino	DNF
	Mingoo Kang	South Korea	DNF
	Charleston Jia Jun Lim	Singapore	DNF
	Cheong Wun Hoi	Macau	DNF
	Pedro Gonzalo	Bolivia	DNF
	Eddy Khaou	Cambodia	DNF
	Martin Anthamatten	Switzerland	DNF

=== 2025 World Mountain Running Championships Short Trail Men's Team Results ===
Rank	Country	Racers	Score
1st place, gold medalist(s)	Spain	4:45:33 Manuel Merillas; 4:51:52 Andreu Blanes; 4:55:48 Alain Santamaria	14:33:13
2nd place, silver medalist(s)	France	4:42:10 Frédéric Tranchand; 4:58:23 Sylvain Cachard; 5:02:56 Johann Baujard	14:43:29
3rd place, bronze medalist(s)	Italy	4:56:56 Luca Del Pero; 4:57:42 Davide Magnini; 4:58:54 Lorenzo Rota Martir	14:53:33
4.	United States	5:02:42 Noah Williams; 5:05:13 Eli Hemming; 5:08:40 David Sinclair	15:16:35
5.	Switzerland	4:58:57 Roberto Delorenzi; 5:14:02 Jonathan Schmid; 5:25:54 Francesco Ceschi	15:38:53
6.	Poland	4:56:38 Marcin Kubica; 5:18:39 Dominik Tabor; 5:24:06 Marcel Fabian	15:39:23
7.	Sweden	4:57:09 Martin Nilsson; 5:32:49 Linus Hultegård; 5:37:59 Olle Kalered	16:07:57
8.	Japan	5:04:36 Ryunosuke Omi; 5:31:46 Hajime Kasagi; 5:33:03 Ruy Ueda	16:09:25
9.	Norway	5:20:38 Anders Haga; 5:28:10 Aasmund Kjøllmoen Steien; 5:29:38 Sindre Buraas	16:18:26
10.	Argentina	5:19:53 Hugo César Rodriguez; 5:31:10 Adrian Berto Gaspar; 5:36:01 Javier Fernando Mariqueo	16:27:04
11.	United Kingdom	5:23:15 Benjamin Rothery; 5:35:27 Bertie Houghton; 5:39:06 Grant Cunliffe	16:37:48
12.	New Zealand	5:23:13 Jackson Robert Cole; 5:31:27 Weston Hill; 5:56:58 David Zebedee Haunschmidt	16:51:38
13.	Bulgaria	5:29:52 Tencho Zhekov; 5:40:28 Georgi Zhekov; 5:48:03 Yordan Todorov	16:58:23
14.	Portugal	5:33:53 Rui Teixeira; 5:34:44 Bruno Silva; 5:55:18 João Ferreira	17:03:55
15.	Canada	5:34:04 Joshua Potvin; 5:38:44 Sam Hendry; 5:52:04 Alexandre Ricard	17:04:52
16.	Germany	5:28:46 Moritz Auf Der Heide; 5:34:01 Marc Dürr; 6:04:23 Johannes Ostfalk	17:07:10
17.	Croatia	5:24:29 Josip Meštrić; 5:39:16 Eric Stipić; 6:19:25 Marko Gorički	17:23:10
18.	Chile	5:41:15 Juan Pablo Llanos; 5:43:48 Matías Barros; 6:05:37 Rodrigo Lara Molina	17:30:40
19.	Philippines	5:37:11 Romnick Tongkaling; 5:45:19 Randolf Gonzales; 6:26:03 John Ray Onifa	17:48:33
20.	Netherlands	5:50:12 Thijs De Lange; 5:54:08 Diederick Calkoen; 6:07:20 Matthijs Karels	17:51:40
21.	Iceland	5:37:23 Thorsteinn Roy Jóhannsson; 6:06:13 Halldór Hermann Jónsson; 6:13:51 Gretar Örn Gudmundsson	17:57:27
22.	Hungary	5:47:01 Máté Dávid Vásárhelyi; 6:10:56 Csoban Csaba Balogh; 6:10:57 Sándor Szabó	18:08:54
23.	Brazil	5:46:39 John Luna Lima; 5:50:43 Rogério Silvestrim; 6:32:57 Ayslan Miragaia	18:10:19
24.	Denmark	5:56:38 Max Boderskov; 6:05:13 Anders Aagaard Hansen; 6:14:22 Nikolaj Brandt Blæsild	18:16:13
25.	Algeria	5:51:39 Zyade Chouiekh; 5:52:13 Adrien Karim Chouchou; 6:34:23 Khalid Chebab	18:18:15
26.	Latvia	5:49:28 Edgars Daugulis; 5:59:53 Kārlis Eiduks; 6:38:44 Jānis Kūms	18:28:05
27.	Ireland	5:59:17 Enda Cloake; 6:09:45 John Kinsella; 6:30:23 Luke Weldon	18:39:25
28.	Colombia	5:39:05 Edson Jair Mejia Casallas; 6:31:23 Diego Armando Vera; 6:48:53 Elkin Yesid Quintana	18:59:21
29.	Australia	5:55:09 Blake Turner; 5:56:20 Vladislav Ixel; 7:26:04 Billy Curtis	19:17:33
30.	Ecuador	6:13:48 Roberth Paul Guachamin Raimundo; 6:23:20 Klever Villacres; 6:56:42 Alex Cevallos	19:33:50
31.	Lithuania	6:17:35 Domantas Kavaliauskas; 6:28:50 Valdas Rubel; 7:04:31 Laurynas Remeika	19:50:56
32.	Mauritius	6:32:26 Sacha George Clement Lagesse; 6:51:05 Ryan Lenferna De La Motte; 7:00:25 Brian Francois Fils	20:23:56
33.	Hong Kong	6:39:14 Ho Chung Wong; 6:44:34 Chun Kit Tsang; 7:21:27 Lok Yin Lo	20:45:15
34.	Chinese Taipei	6:24:44 Chih-Yuan Chang; 7:18:08 Yu-Jian Jiang; 7:19:35 Zhi-Kai Wu	21:02:27
35.	Malaysia	7:16:16 Min Xiang Lee; 7:34:36 Daniel Yap Chun Mun; 7:58:24 Mohamad Shamsul Kamal	22:49:16

=== 2025 World Mountain Running Championships Short Trail Women's Results ===
Distance 44.5km, total ascent of 3,660 m, total descent of 3,660 m.

Rank	Name	Nationality	Time
1st place, gold medalist(s)	Tove Alexandersson	Sweden	5:04:20
2nd place, silver medalist(s)	Sara Alonso	Spain	5:38:15
3rd place, bronze medalist(s)	Naomi Lang	United Kingdom	5:38:54
4	Ida Amelie Eid Robsahm	Norway	5:44:54
5	Anna Plattner	Austria	5:45:40
6	Clementine Geoffray	France	5:46:28
7	Jane Maus	United States	5:48:23
8	Ikram Rharsalla	Spain	5:53:19
9	Johanna Gelfgren	Sweden	5:56:41
10	Barbora Bukovjan	Switzerland	5:56:43
11	Ruby Lindquist	United States	5:57:07
12	Kalie McCrystal	Canada	5:57:23
13	Patricia Pineda	Spain	5:57:30
14	Maria Fuentes	Spain	5:57:41
15	Shangave Balendran	Norway	5:59:42
16	Ioana Madalina Amariei	Romania	6:01:51
17	Maëlle Minnig	Switzerland	6:03:59
18	Olivia Magnone	France	6:04:11
19	Mirjam Niederberger	Switzerland	6:04:59
20	Adeline Martin	France	6:05:16
21	Tereza Hrochová	Czech Republic	6:05:28
22	Anna-Stiina Erkkilä	Finland	6:05:55
23	Mirosława Witowska	Poland	6:09:45
24	Denisa Ionela Dragomir	Romania	6:10:12
25	Alice Testini	Italy	6:10:23
26	Roberta Jacquin	Italy	6:11:22
27	Cristina Simion	Romania	6:12:25
28	Amanda Nilsson	Sweden	6:13:41
29	Daniela Oemus	Germany	6:13:58
30	Sarah Kistner	Germany	6:14:40
31	Cecilia Basso	Italy	6:14:53
32	Ivana Líšková	Slovakia	6:16:01
33	Renée Cardinaals	Netherlands	6:16:50
34	Tabor Scholl-Hemming	United States	6:18:20
35	Barbro Fjällstedt Oljans	Sweden	6:18:57
36	Lindsay Allison	United States	6:19:15
37	Urszula Paprocka	Poland	6:19:53
38	Jade Belzberg	Canada	6:21:21
39	Isabell Speer	Austria	6:23:37
40	Sophie Maschi	Italy	6:24:26
41	Sofiia Poroknhavets	Ukraine	6:25:44
42	Kristiane Width	Finland	6:26:05
43	Caitlin Fielder	New Zealand	6:28:49
44	Emily Cowper-Coles	United Kingdom	6:29:34
45	Hanna Darmohrai	Ukraine	6:32:36
46	Emilie Menuet	France	6:33:18
47	Hélène Delmée	Belgium	6:34:24
48	Oihana Cortazar	Spain	6:34:59
49	Andreea Alina Gabor-Pîșcu	Romania	6:36:20
50	Blanca Maribel Llumiquinga	Ecuador	6:38:47
51	Mirjam Saarheim	Norway	6:38:54
52	Takako Takamura	Japan	6:41:34
53	Marcela Vašínová	Czech Republic	6:42:10
54	Roxana Paola Flores	Argentina	6:44:21
55	Emilia Giustiniani	Argentina	6:46:15
56	Ana Paula Rodrigues	Portugal	6:49:13
57	Laurie Proulx	Canada	6:49:59
58	Francieli Renata Kiekow	Brazil	6:53:19
59	Pirjo Saukko	Finland	6:54:23
60	Sylwia Kapusta-Szydłak	Poland	6:55:01
61	Ana Carolina Oliveira	Portugal	6:58:09
62	Jeanette Cayuqueo Domininhual	Chile	6:58:49
63	Carol-Ann Rolle	Canada	7:01:01
64	Helene Draborg	Denmark	7:01:11
65	Judith Meskers	Netherlands	7:02:53
66	Nicole Lacis	Canada	7:02:57
67	Anna Berglind Pálmadóttir	Iceland	7:03:45
68	Irén Tiricz	Hungary	7:05:23
69	Sarah-Jayne Miller	Australia	7:05:27
70	Dominga Villarino Le Blanc	Chile	7:06:31
71	Anete Švilpe	Latvia	7:11:42
72	Íris Anna Skúladóttir	Iceland	7:11:59
73	Maria Papapostolou	Greece	7:12:17
74	Matea Grabovica	Croatia	7:13:03
75	Line Brandt Pedersen	Denmark	7:20:08
76	Patricia Mckibbin	Australia	7:21:44
77	Maria Soledad Sanchez Ruiz	Argentina	7:24:00
78	Leonor Calvo Galilea	Chile	7:24:48
79	Jessica Jason	Australia	7:24:50
80	Patricia Serafim	Portugal	7:25:06
81	Paula Nazal Labrin	Chile	7:25:14
82	Anouk Van De Coevering	Netherlands	7:26:02
83	Ana Mihalić	Croatia	7:26:20
84	Cho Yu Lam	Hong Kong	7:27:34
85	Helen Mino Faukner	United States	7:28:04
86	Amelia Horne	New Zealand	7:29:12
87	Ljiljana Krasić	Serbia	7:31:00
88	Lucie Gerard	Cambodia	7:32:46
89	Johanne Mosgaard	Denmark	7:32:57
90	Alejandrina Villacres	Ecuador	7:33:52
91	Nora Havlínová	Austria	7:34:09
92	Skaistė Kaštėtaitė-Meižikienė	Lithuania	7:34:19
93	Ana Maria Pineda	Colombia	7:34:52
94	Sorcha Loughnane	Ireland	7:35:28
95	Pilar Fernández	Uruguay	7:35:34
96	Paula Soares	Portugal	7:35:46
97	Joy Beltran	Philippines	7:36:43
98	Monika Fahle	Lithuania	7:38:58
99	Martha Cecilia Pesantez Chuqui	Ecuador	7:39:03
100	Petra Kulić	Croatia	7:39:06
101	Anne Marie John	Mauritius	7:43:39
102	Yuliia Tarasova	Ukraine	7:44:25
103	Jekaterina Gaļļamova	Latvia	7:44:41
104	Dominika Stelmach	Poland	7:47:26
105	Chia-Yen Lee	Chinese Taipei	7:50:07
106	Laura O'Driscoll	Ireland	7:50:12
107	Sunyeon Lee	South Korea	7:50:20
108	Martina Štrkalj	Croatia	7:51:21
109	Lidija Radulović	Serbia	7:54:54
110	Erzsébet Prokopp	Hungary	7:56:40
111	Sel-A Joung	South Korea	8:00:00
112	Fernanda Erica Martinez	Argentina	8:01:35
	Mercedes Estigarribia	Paraguay	DNF
	Lucía Carrizo	Uruguay	DNF
	Siti Nuraini	Indonesia	DNF
	Chiara Guiducci	San Marino	DNF
	Wan-Yun Kao	Chinese Taipei	DNF
	Liliana Suquillo	Ecuador	DNF
	Michaela Brtníčková	Czech Republic	DNF
	María Inés Regusci	Uruguay	DNF
	Raimonda Vaičaitytė	Lithuania	DNF
	Leticia Da Silva Saltori	Brazil	DNF
	Tenzin Dolma	India	DNF
	Veronika Jurišić	Croatia	DNF
	Martina Cumerlato	Italy	DNF
	Sonia Chuve	Bolivia	DNF
	Grayson Murphy	United States	DNF
	Elín Edda Sigurðardóttir	Iceland	DNF
	Yi-Ching Wu	Chinese Taipei	DNF
	Guan Shin Law	Malaysia	DNF
	Yunmi Lee	South Korea	DNF
	Inês Gomes	Portugal	DNF
	Judith Wyder	Switzerland	DNF
	Lena Bahat	Croatia	DNF
	Sofia Alfonso	Colombia	DNF
	Stephanie Ryall	Canada	DNF
	Katie Morgan	New Zealand	DNF
	Caroline Jepkoech Kimutai	Kenya	DNF
	Malen Osa	Spain	DNF
	Noime Fernandez	Philippines	DNF
	Ieng Cheung	Macau	DNF
	Tereza Hudcová	Czech Republic	DNF
	Līga Rusiņa	Latvia	DNF
	Halimatun Saadiah Mat Nor	Malaysia	DNF
	Rosalia Guachalla	Bolivia	DNF
	Rumilda Mongelos Arce	Paraguay	DNF
	Jonė Paurytė	Lithuania	DNF
	Kata Tomaschof	Hungary	DNF
	Sunyeong Kim	South Korea	DNF
	Lucille Germain	France	DNF
	Silvia Schwaiger	Slovakia	DNF
	Laura Kate Bungard	New Zealand	DNF
	Anna Kļučņika	Latvia	DNF
	Yan Ting Sim	Singapore	DNF
	Lalitah Binti Lintanga	Malaysia	DNF
	Wen Yi Lim	Singapore	DNF
	Charlotte Jane Walker Hand	New Zealand	DNF
	Xiaojing Mo	Macau	DNF
	Vicki Yuxuan Zhu	Singapore	DNF
	Wen-Chi Kuo	Chinese Taipei	DNF

=== 2025 World Mountain Running Championships Short Trail Women's Team Results ===
Rank	Country	Racers	Score
1st place, gold medalist(s)	Sweden	5:04:20 Tove Alexandersson; 5:56:41 Johanna Gelfgren; 6:13:41 Amanda Nilsson	17:14:42
2nd place, silver medalist(s)	Spain	5:38:15 Sara Alonso; 5:53:19 Ikram Rharsalla; 5:57:30 Patricia Pineda	17:29:04
3rd place, bronze medalist(s)	France	5:46:28 Clementine Geoffray; 6:04:11 Olivia Magnone; 6:05:16 Adeline Martin	17:55:55
4.	United States	5:48:23 Jane Maus; 5:57:07 Ruby Lindquist; 6:18:20 Tabor Scholl-Hemming	18:03:50
5.	Norway	5:44:54 Ida Amelie Eid Robsahm; 5:59:42 Shangave Balendran; 6:38:54 Mirjam Saarheim	18:23:30
6.	Romania	6:01:51 Ioana Madalina Amariei; 6:10:12 Denisa Ionela Dragomir; 6:12:25 Cristina Simion	18:24:28
7.	Italy	6:10:23 Alice Testini; 6:11:22 Roberta Jacquin; 6:14:53 Cecilia Basso	18:36:38
8.	Czech Republic	5:56:43 Barbora Bukovjan; 6:05:28 Tereza Hrochová; 6:42:10 Marcela Vašínová	18:44:21
9.	Canada	5:57:23 Kalie Mccrystal; 6:21:21 Jade Belzberg; 6:49:59 Laurie Proulx	19:08:43
10.	Poland	6:09:45 Mirosława Witowska; 6:19:53 Urszula Paprocka; 6:55:01 Sylwia Kapusta-Szydłak	19:24:39
11.	Finland	6:05:55 Anna-Stiina Erkkilä; 6:26:05 Kristiane Width; 6:54:23 Pirjo Saukko	19:26:23
12.	Austria	5:45:40 Anna Plattner; 6:23:37 Isabell Speer; 7:34:09 Nora Havlínová	19:43:26
13.	Ukraine	6:25:44 Sofiia Poroknhavets; 6:32:36 Hanna Darmohrai; 7:44:25 Yuliia Tarasova	20:42:45
14.	Netherlands	6:16:50 Renée Cardinaals; 7:02:53 Judith Meskers; 7:26:02 Anouk Van De Coevering	20:45:45
15.	Argentina	6:44:21 Roxana Paola Flores; 6:46:15 Emilia Giustiniani; 7:24:00 Maria Soledad Sanchez Ruiz	20:54:36
16.	Portugal	6:49:13 Ana Paula Rodrigues; 6:58:09 Ana Carolina Oliveira; 7:25:06 Patricia Serafim	21:12:28
17.	Chile	6:58:49 Jeanette Cayuqueo Domininhual; 7:06:31 Dominga Villarino Le Blanc; 7:24:48 Leonor Calvo Galilea	21:30:08
18.	Ecuador	6:38:47 Blanca Maribel Llumiquinga; 7:33:52 Alejandrina Villacres; 7:39:03 Martha Cecilia Pesantez Chuqui	21:51:42
19.	Australia	7:05:27 Sarah-Jayne Miller; 7:21:44 Patricia Mckibbin; 7:24:50 Jessica Jason	21:52:01
20.	Denmark	7:01:11 Helene Draborg; 7:20:08 Line Brandt Pedersen; 7:32:57 Johanne Mosgaard	21:54:16
21.	Croatia	7:13:03 Matea Grabovica; 7:26:20 Ana Mihalić; 7:39:06 Petra Kulić	22:18:29

=== 2025 World Mountain Running Championships Long Trail Women's Results ===
Distance 81.2 km, total ascent of 5410 m, total descent of 5410 m.

Rank	Name	Nationality	Time
1st place, gold medalist(s)	Katie Schide	United States	9:57:59
2nd place, silver medalist(s)	Sunmaya Budha	Nepal	10:23:03
3rd place, bronze medalist(s)	Fabiola Conti	Italy	10:35:51
4	Jazmine Lowther	Canada	10:45:18
5	Rosa Maria Lara	Spain	10:47:15
6	Anne Lise Rousset	France	10:50:45
7	Martina Valmassoi	Italy	10:55:07
8	Marion Delespierre	France	11:03:01
9	Giuditta Turini	Italy	11:05:19
10	Hillary Gerardi	France	11:05:20
11	Elísa Kristinsdóttir	Iceland	11:10:24
12	Honoka Akiyama	Japan	11:11:37
13	Andrea Kolbeinsdóttir	Iceland	11:12:39
14	Shea Aquilano	United States	11:18:25
15	Sylvia Nordskar	Norway	11:20:55
16	Mari Klakegg Fenre	Norway	11:21:34
17	Jennifer Lemoine	France	11:25:30
18	Anne-Cecile Thevenot	France	11:25:31
19	Sara-Rebekka Færø Linde	Norway	11:33:06
20	Irene Saggin	Italy	11:34:14
21	Ida Nilsson	Sweden	11:34:20
22	Katarzyna Dombrowska	Poland	11:37:29
23	Allison Baca	United States	11:38:55
24	Martina Chialvo	Italy	11:39:06
25	Ariane Wilhem	Switzerland	11:43:14
26	Ines Astrain	Spain	11:48:35
27	Genma Arenas Alcazar	Spain	11:56:11
28	Ida-Sophie Hegemann	Germany	11:57:46
29	Gudfinna Bjornsdottir	Iceland	11:58:21
30	Sara Bergen	Canada	12:01:32
31	Viktorija Senūtienė	Lithuania	12:03:20
32	Charlotta Brinks	Germany	12:09:02
33	Emily Schmitz	United States	12:10:36
34	Maria Del Mar Pastor	Spain	12:13:03
35	Klaire Rhodes	United States	12:15:39
36	Martina Klančnik Potrč	Slovenia	12:17:01
37	Lizzie Richardson	United Kingdom	12:20:41
38	Barbara Ruiz	Spain	12:21:10
39	Ayelen Liberal	Argentina	12:26:08
40	Eva-Maria Sperger	Germany	12:26:17
41	Jessica Geovana Tipan Gutierrez	Ecuador	12:26:32
42	Ivana Širić	Croatia	12:29:03
43	Vincenta Mikulėnaitė	Lithuania	12:30:28
44	Elizabeth Dangadang	Philippines	12:33:17
45	Marjo Liikanen	Finland	12:37:36
46	Anabel Estefania Oviedo Zelarayán	Argentina	12:38:56
47	Sara Escobar Carron	Switzerland	12:38:59
48	Alina Anna Wylężałek	Poland	12:42:20
49	Małgorzara Popek Moczulska	Poland	12:42:20
50	Simone Haastrup	Denmark	12:43:28
51	Josépha Seydoux	Switzerland	12:46:26
52	Emma Malene Lemminger	Denmark	12:48:12
53	Marisa Vieira	Portugal	12:50:07
54	Klaudia Petters	Poland	12:54:32
55	Nicole Paton	Australia	12:58:11
56	Zita Kosač	Lithuania	12:58:41
57	Cecelia Mattas	Australia	12:59:19
58	Eszter Csillag	Hungary	13:02:10
59	Polina Zakharova	Ukraine	13:10:28
60	Yuri Yoshizumi	Japan	13:12:57
61	Genevieve Asselin Demers	Canada	13:14:06
62	Tania Diaz Slater	Argentina	13:14:28
63	Susan Van Weperen	Netherlands	13:16:54
64	Julia Wendy Chamberlain	New Zealand	13:17:51
65	Susany Perardt	Brazil	13:18:59
66	Man Yee Cheung	Hong Kong	13:32:28
67	Susana Echeverría	Portugal	13:33:08
68	Vera Bernardo	Portugal	13:34:20
69	Hillary Allen	United States	13:35:16
70	Lana Ostojić	Croatia	13:35:22
71	Cristina Arreiol	Portugal	13:36:18
72	Ki Chun Wong	Hong Kong	13:36:49
73	Julija Šorytė	Lithuania	13:38:03
74	Caitlin Schindel	Canada	13:43:20
75	Mihaela Kaligari Hek	Croatia	13:44:25
76	Jelena Malyševa	Lithuania	13:47:25
77	Linda Boldāne	Latvia	13:51:21
78	Ivita Šale	Latvia	14:08:33
79	Mylene Sansoucy	Canada	14:14:19
80	Hilda Rebeca Pusay Chiriboga	Ecuador	14:20:51
81	Kellie Angel	Australia	14:24:15
82	Vilma Giménez Cabrera	Paraguay	14:35:15
83	Robin Mildren	Canada	14:41:06
84	Patrícia Honda Gerage	Brazil	14:48:18
85	Denise De Farias Da Maia	Brazil	14:48:18
86	Dayana Gutiérrez	Ecuador	14:49:44
87	Mel Brandon	New Zealand	14:58:17
88	Aoife Mundow	Ireland	14:58:49
	Ya-Zhu Zhuang	Chinese Taipei	DNF
	Hannah McRae	Australia	DNF
	Angelica Carolina Cabrera Cruz	Mexico	DNF
	Yajaira Rubio	Colombia	DNF
	Jinhee Kim	South Korea	DNF
	Kaisa Pirkonen	Finland	DNF
	Carla Pereira	Portugal	DNF
	Bengs Eevi	Finland	DNF
	Rosanna Buchauer	Germany	DNF
	Mireia Pons	Spain	DNF
	María Mercedes Pila	Ecuador	DNF
	Septiana Nia Swastika	Indonesia	DNF
	Sonia Bouaicha	Algeria	DNF
	Shu'en Jeanette Wang	Singapore	DNF
	Anita Lackovic	Croatia	DNF
	Andrea Nazara	Argentina	DNF
	Sara Dekker	Netherlands	DNF
	Katarzyna Wilk	Poland	DNF
	Richele May McKenzie	New Zealand	DNF
	Maja Urban	Croatia	DNF
	Meng-Yun Tung	Chinese Taipei	DNF
	Laura Moratorio	Uruguay	DNF
	Maja Bonačić	Croatia	DNF
	Wen-Ting Hsieh	Chinese Taipei	DNF
	Chi Yee Yan	Hong Kong	DNF
	Idalia Salvatierra	Bolivia	DNF
	Carmen Maria Montaño Lezama	Venezuela	DNF
	Siok Har Lim	Malaysia	DNF
	Sanita Roze	Latvia	DNF
	Zhonghuang Xu	Macau	DNF
	Marija Kraule	Latvia	DNF
	Bianca Dominguez	Argentina	DNF
	Angelie Cabalo	Philippines	DNF

=== 2025 World Mountain Running Championships Long Trail Women's Team Results ===
Rank	Country	Racers	Score
1st place, gold medalist(s)	Italy	10:35:51 Fabiola Conti; 10:55:07 Martina Valmassoi; 11:05:19 Giuditta Turini	32:36:17
2nd place, silver medalist(s)	United States	9:57:59 Katie Schide; 11:18:25 Shea Aquilano; 11:38:55 Allison Baca	32:55:19
3rd place, bronze medalist(s)	France	10:50:45 Anne Lise Rousset; 11:03:01 Marion Delespierre; 11:05:20 Hillary Gerardi	32:59:06
4.	Norway	11:20:55 Sylvia Nordskar; 11:21:34 Mari Klakegg Fenre; 11:33:06 Sara-Rebekka Færø Linde	34:15:35
5.	Iceland	11:10:24 Elísa Kristinsdóttir; 11:12:39 Andrea Kolbeinsdóttir; 11:58:21 Gudfinna Bjornsdottir	34:21:24
6.	Spain	10:47:15 Rosa Maria Lara; 11:48:35 Ines Astrain; 11:56:11 Genma Arenas Alcazar	34:32:01
7.	Canada	10:45:18 Jazmine Lowther; 12:01:32 Sara Bergen; 13:14:06 Genevieve Asselin Demers	36:00:56
8.	Germany	11:57:46 Ida-Sophie Hegemann; 12:09:02 Charlotta Brinks; 12:26:17 Eva-Maria Sperger	36:33:05
9.	Poland	11:37:29 Katarzyna Dombrowska; 12:42:20 Alina Anna Wylężałek; 12:42:20 Małgorzara Popek Moczulska	37:02:09
10.	Switzerland	11:43:14 Ariane Wilhem; 12:38:59 Sara Escobar Carron; 12:46:26 Josépha Seydoux	37:08:39
11.	Lithuania	12:03:20 Viktorija Senūtienė; 12:30:28 Vincenta Mikulėnaitė; 12:58:41 Zita Kosač	37:32:29
12.	Argentina	12:26:08 Ayelen Liberal; 12:38:56 Anabel Estefania Oviedo Zelarayán; 13:14:28 Tania Diaz Slater	38:19:32
13.	Croatia	12:29:03 Ivana Širić; 13:35:22 Lana Ostojić; 13:44:25 Mihaela Kaligari Hek	39:48:50
14.	Portugal	12:50:07 Marisa Vieira; 13:33:08 Susana Echeverría; 13:34:20 Vera Bernardo	39:57:35
15.	Australia	12:58:11 Nicole Paton; 12:59:19 Cecelia Mattas; 14:24:15 Kellie Angel	40:21:45
16.	Ecuador	12:26:32 Jessica Geovana Tipan Gutierrez; 14:20:51 Hilda Rebeca Pusay Chiriboga; 14:49:44 Dayana Gutiérrez	41:37:07
17.	Brazil	13:18:59 Susany Perardt; 14:48:18 Patrícia Honda Gerage; 14:48:18 Denise De Farias Da Maia	42:55:35

=== 2025 World Mountain Running Championships Long Trail Men's Results ===
Distance 81.2 km, total ascent of 5410 m, total descent of 5410 m.

Rank	Name	Nationality	Time
1st place, gold medalist(s)	Jim Walmsley	United States	8:35:11
2nd place, silver medalist(s)	Benjamin Roubiol	France	8:46:05
3rd place, bronze medalist(s)	Louison Coiffet	France	8:46:05
4	Cristian Minoggio	Italy	8:57:16
5	Peter Fraňo	Slovakia	9:01:37
6	Petter Engdahl	Sweden	9:03:38
7	Andrzej Witek	Poland	9:12:38
8	Adam Peterman	United States	9:18:36
9	Francesco Puppi	Italy	9:20:22
10	Vincent Bouillard	France	9:22:10
11	Baptiste Chassagne	France	9:25:28
12	Hugh Chatfield	United Kingdom	9:30:17
13	Joaquin Andres Lopez Iturralde	Ecuador	9:31:19
14	Leonard Albert Mitrica	Romania	9:34:48
15	Fredrik Bruseth Toreli	Norway	9:37:11
16	Andreas Reiterer	Italy	9:41:28
17	Miguel Arsénio	Portugal	9:43:46
18	Zach Miller	United States	9:44:01
19	Gabriel Santos Rueda	Argentina	9:44:58
20	Manuel Anguita	Spain	9:46:10
21	Ramon Manetsch	Switzerland	9:48:52
22	Valentin Toma	Romania	9:52:04
23	Julien Calvo	Spain	9:53:11
24	Bartosz Gorczyca	Poland	9:54:30
25	Tracen Knopp	United States	9:58:03
26	Tomáš Maceček	Czech Republic	9:58:52
27	Tobias Baggenstos	Switzerland	9:59:05
28	Manuel Hartweg	Germany	9:59:40
29	Claudio Diaz	Spain	10:04:21
30	Luke Grenfell-Shaw	United Kingdom	10:05:16
31	Tyler Green	United States	10:05:51
32	Kulung Suman	Nepal	10:06:25
33	Erland Åkra Eldrup	Norway	10:06:31
34	Nicolas Benavides Bohle	Chile	10:06:43
35	Andrew Symonds	United Kingdom	10:07:52
36	Tomáš Farník	Czech Republic	10:10:34
37	Man Kumar Roka Magar	Nepal	10:10:53
38	Juan Belman	Mexico	10:11:47
39	Riccardo Montani	Italy	10:13:21
40	Jean-Philippe Thibodeau	Canada	10:14:18
41	Marek Causidis	Czech Republic	10:18:57
42	Pello Berrizbeitia	Spain	10:20:51
43	Christian Stern	Austria	10:21:03
44	Gionata Cogliati	Italy	10:21:31
45	Lucien Epiney	Switzerland	10:21:57
46	Kamil Leśniak	Poland	10:22:05
47	Thorbergur Ingi Jónsson	Iceland	10:22:23
48	Alexander Hutter	Austria	10:23:55
49	Ben Burgess	Australia	10:26:53
50	Christopher Guevara	Ecuador	10:28:52
51	Yamato Yoshino	Japan	10:30:22
52	Arnie Macañeras	Philippines	10:31:21
53	Hugo Gonçalves	Portugal	10:33:59
54	Bruno Gonçalves	Portugal	10:34:42
55	Abel Carretero	Spain	10:38:24
56	Martin Halász	Slovakia	10:40:13
57	Karol Matyssek	Poland	10:44:44
58	Mathias Deutschbauer	Austria	10:45:00
59	Patrik Milata	Slovakia	10:45:09
60	Sigurjon Ernir Sturluson	Iceland	10:47:10
61	Johannes Löw	Germany	10:47:52
62	Raphael Sprenger	Switzerland	10:49:16
63	Pavle Kruljac	Croatia	10:49:31
64	Mathieu Delpeuch	France	10:51:30
65	Kristian Joergensen	Denmark	10:52:22
66	Benjamin Vuk	Croatia	10:52:49
67	Yuya Kawasaki	Japan	10:59:10
68	Marcus Ribi	Canada	10:59:56
69	Paulius Pečiūra	Lithuania	11:01:06
70	Nelson Santos	Portugal	11:01:27
71	Jon Lihtenegar Vidmajer	Slovenia	11:02:00
72	Janez Klančnik	Slovenia	11:02:00
73	Alastair Graves	United Kingdom	11:02:06
74	Larry Apolinario	Philippines	11:02:17
75	Brandon Gardiner	Canada	11:03:16
76	Keith Wigley	United Kingdom	11:05:10
77	Marco Augusto Vidoz	Argentina	11:06:30
78	Hirokazu Nishimura	Japan	11:06:51
79	Elliot Cardin	Canada	11:06:55
80	Toms Komass	Latvia	11:08:34
80	Toms Komass	Latvia	11:08:34
81	Andrew Gaskell	Australia	11:13:14
82	Matthew Crehan	Australia	11:13:14
83	Kok Wai Tse	Hong Kong	11:13:43
84	Jobert Elmaguin	Philippines	11:20:09
85	Ricki Wynne	Ireland	11:23:16
86	Said Hernan Lopez	Colombia	11:23:44
87	Franco Hernán Oro	Argentina	11:25:09
88	Rodrigo Machado Oliveira	Brazil	11:30:03
89	Marcel Geißler	Germany	11:31:59
90	Jack Scott	United Kingdom	11:33:01
91	Robin Juillaguet	France	11:35:45
92	Johannes Dörr	Germany	11:44:08
93	Célio Augusto Da Rosa	Brazil	11:44:35
94	Nino Janki	Switzerland	11:46:54
95	Hiroki Kai	Japan	11:49:11
96	Maximiliano Vazquez	Uruguay	11:51:57
97	Tsz Hong Tam	Hong Kong	11:52:46
98	Morocho López	Ecuador	11:57:33
99	Tomi Mikkola	Finland	11:58:03
100	Alois Ludwig Schindler	New Zealand	11:59:08
101	Nikolaj Dam	Denmark	11:59:13
102	Antun Posavec	Croatia	12:02:49
103	Ernestas Kavoliūnas	Lithuania	12:04:37
104	Marin Mandekić	Croatia	12:05:03
105	Vaidas Žlabys	Lithuania	12:08:36
106	Kento Tamura	Japan	12:11:05
107	Antonio Belmont Gonzalez	Mexico	12:13:01
108	Kristaps Magone	Latvia	12:13:03
109	Patrick O'Leary	Ireland	12:13:32
110	Thomas Dade	Australia	12:14:26
111	Song-Ming Syu	Chinese Taipei	12:17:34
112	Alberto Gonzalez Acuña	Uruguay	12:24:48
113	Alex Xavier Lozano Espinosa	Ecuador	12:26:44
114	Martín Rodriguez Chamorro	Uruguay	12:28:34
115	Miklós Őri	Hungary	12:31:25
116	Sange Sherpa	Nepal	12:33:09
117	Jussi Nokelainen	Finland	12:33:49
118	Hsiang-Yu Wu	Chinese Taipei	12:34:32
119	Gonzalo Caballero	Uruguay	12:37:25
120	Gonzalo Inzaurralde	Uruguay	12:37:25
121	Andrii Tkachuk	Ukraine	12:37:44
122	Sebastian Eneros Rilling	Chile	12:43:16
123	Fuk Cheung Tsang	Hong Kong	12:47:22
124	Darko Rogina	Croatia	12:47:24
125	Simon Desvaux De Marigny	Mauritius	12:50:31
126	Yaroslav Koval	Ukraine	12:55:32
127	Paulius Kovarskas	Lithuania	12:56:56
128	William Peter Lawrence Bielby	New Zealand	12:58:38
129	Diego Tales Da Silva	Brazil	13:07:52
130	Brandon Miller	Canada	13:08:00
131	Ivan Diklić	Croatia	13:16:57
132	Do Kim	South Korea	13:16:59
133	Cristian Ariel Aranda	Paraguay	13:17:08
134	Klāvs Stankevics	Latvia	13:24:48
135	Jonas Narkeliunas	Lithuania	13:36:32
136	Dongkuk Jang	South Korea	13:41:18
137	Brian Enrique Pasmor Alarcón	Paraguay	13:46:08
138	Mário Fonseca	Portugal	13:47:20
139	Han-Ching Su	Chinese Taipei	14:03:47
140	Dang Trung Nguyen	Singapore	14:09:26
141	Artūrs Junolainens	Latvia	14:26:48
142	Weng Wa Leong	Macau	14:38:01
143	Gonzalo David Galván Baez	Paraguay	14:41:35
144	Chia-Chieh Wang	Chinese Taipei	14:43:16
145	Rahmat	Indonesia	14:50:31
146	Patricio Cavieres Melgarejo	Chile	14:52:35
147	Sheng-Hung Lin	Chinese Taipei	14:54:16
	Tomas Hudec	Czech Republic	DNF
	Caleb Olson	United States	DNF
	José Ange Fernandez	Spain	DNF
	Morten Antonsen	Norway	DNF
	Thomas Palmen	Netherlands	DNF
	Henrik Westerlin	Denmark	DNF
	Tomasz Skupień	Poland	DNF
	Luis Efrain Urbina Frausto	Mexico	DNF
	Jan Höglund	Finland	DNF
	Nicolas Marechal	Cambodia	DNF
	Catalin Sorecau	Romania	DNF
	Patricio Gonzalez	Argentina	DNF
	Luis Soto Ayamante	Chile	DNF
	Florian Pyszel	Poland	DNF
	Andrew Phillip Crosland	New Zealand	DNF
	Bogdan Damian	Romania	DNF
	Chor Gan Deric Lau	Singapore	DNF
	Josh Campbell	New Zealand	DNF
	Octaviu Raul Butaci	Romania	DNF
	Anton Gustafsson	Sweden	DNF
	Andrei Gabriel Preda	Romania	DNF
	András Herczog	Hungary	DNF
	Dimitrios Seletis	Greece	DNF
	Cillian Fleming	Ireland	DNF
	Issiakhem Ouazene	Algeria	DNF
	Jean-François Cauchon	Canada	DNF
	Yusof Abdul Manan	Malaysia	DNF
	Chi Hsiung Ian Lye	Singapore	DNF
	Muhammad Aqmal Hakim Bin Mohd Adzmi	Malaysia	DNF
	Yi-Lin Chung	Chinese Taipei	DNF
	Will Bell	New Zealand	DNF
	Yusof Joseph Wong Nyuk Oi	Malaysia	DNF

=== 2025 World Mountain Running Championships Long Trail Men's Team Results ===
Rank	Country	Racers	Score
1st place, gold medalist(s)	France	8:46:05 Benjamin Roubiol; 8:46:05 Louison Coiffet; 9:22:10 Vincent Bouillard	26:54:20
2nd place, silver medalist(s)	United States	8:35:11 Jim Walmsley; 9:18:36 Adam Peterman; 9:44:01 Zach Miller	27:37:48
3rd place, bronze medalist(s)	Italy	8:57:16 Cristian Minoggio; 9:20:22 Francesco Puppi; 9:41:28 Andreas Reiterer	27:59:06
4.	Poland	9:12:38 Andrzej Witek; 9:54:30 Bartosz Gorczyca; 10:22:05 Kamil Leśniak	29:29:13
5.	United Kingdom	9:30:17 Hugh Chatfield; 10:05:16 Luke Grenfell-Shaw; 10:07:52 Andrew Symonds	29:43:25
6.	Spain	9:46:10 Manuel Anguita; 9:53:11 Julien Calvo; 10:04:21 Claudio Diaz	29:43:42
7.	Switzerland	9:48:52 Ramon Manetsch; 9:59:05 Tobias Baggenstos; 10:21:57 Lucien Epiney	30:09:54
8.	Slovakia	9:01:37 Peter Fraňo; 10:40:13 Martin Halász; 10:45:09 Patrik Milata	30:26:59
9.	Czech Republic	9:58:52 Tomáš Maceček; 10:10:34 Tomáš Farník; 10:18:57 Marek Causidis	30:28:23
10.	Portugal	9:43:46 Miguel Arsénio; 10:33:59 Hugo Gonçalves; 10:34:42 Bruno Gonçalves	30:52:27
11.	Austria	10:21:03 Christian Stern; 10:23:55 Alexander Hutter; 10:45:00 Mathias Deutschbauer	31:29:58
12.	Ecuador	9:31:19 Joaquin Andres Lopez Iturralde; 10:28:52 Christopher Guevara; 11:57:33 Morocho López	31:57:44
13.	Argentina	9:44:58 Gabriel Santos Rueda; 11:06:30 Marco Augusto Vidoz; 11:25:09 Franco Hernán Oro	32:16:37
14.	Canada	10:14:18 Jean-Philippe Thibodeau; 10:59:56 Marcus Ribi; 11:03:16 Brandon Gardiner	32:17:30
15.	Germany	9:59:40 Manuel Hartweg; 10:47:52 Johannes Löw; 11:31:59 Marcel Geißler	32:19:31
16.	Japan	10:30:22 Yamato Yoshino; 10:59:10 Yuya Kawasaki; 11:06:51 Hirokazu Nishimura	32:36:23
17.	Nepal	10:06:25 Kulung Suman; 10:10:53 Man Kumar Roka Magar; 12:33:09 Sange Sherpa	32:50:27
18.	Australia	10:26:53 Ben Burgess; 11:13:14 Andrew Gaskell; 11:13:14 Matthew Crehan	32:53:21
19.	Philippines	10:31:21 Arnie Macañeras; 11:02:17 Larry Apolinario; 11:20:09 Jobert Elmaguin	32:53:47
20.	Croatia	10:49:31 Pavle Kruljac; 10:52:49 Benjamin Vuk; 12:02:49 Antun Posavec	33:45:09
21.	Lithuania	11:01:06 Paulius Pečiūra; 12:04:37 Ernestas Kavoliūnas; 12:08:36 Vaidas Žlabys	35:14:19
22.	Hong Kong	11:13:43 Kok Wai Tse; 11:52:46 Tsz Hong Tam; 12:47:22 Fuk Cheung Tsang	35:53:51
23.	Brazil	11:30:03 Rodrigo Machado Oliveira; 11:44:35 Célio Augusto Da Rosa; 13:07:52 Diego Tales Da Silva	36:22:30
24.	Uruguay	11:51:57 Maximiliano Vazquez; 12:24:48 Alberto Gonzalez Acuña; 12:28:34 Martín Rodriguez Chamorro	36:45:19
25.	Latvia	11:08:34 Toms Komass; 12:13:03 Kristaps Magone; 13:24:48 Klāvs Stankevics	36:46:25
26.	Chile	10:06:43 Nicolas Benavides Bohle; 12:43:16 Sebastian Eneros Rilling; 14:52:35 Patricio Cavieres Melgarejo	37:42:34
27.	Chinese Taipei	12:17:34 Song-Ming Syu; 12:34:32 Hsiang-Yu Wu; 14:43:16 Chia-Chieh Wang	38:55:53
28.	Paraguay	13:17:08 Cristian Ariel Aranda; 13:46:08 Brian Enrique Pasmor Alarcón; 14:41:35 Gonzalo David Galván Baez	41:44:51

=== 2025 World Mountain Running Championships Mountain Classic (up and down) Men's Results ===
Distance 14.3 km, total ascent of 775 m, total descent of 775 m.

Rank	Name	Nationality	Time
1st place, gold medalist(s)	Ombogo Kiriago Philemon	Kenya	1:02:30
2nd place, silver medalist(s)	Martin Kiprotich	Uganda	1:03:14
3rd place, bronze medalist(s)	Paul Machoka	Kenya	1:03:25
4	Dominik Rolli	Switzerland	1:03:56
5	Ken Koros	Kenya	1:04:08
6	Michael Selelo	Kenya	1:04:24
7	Aziz Chebet	Uganda	1:04:30
8	Brayan Rodríguez	Mexico	1:04:36
9	Jonatha Camilo Castillo	Colombia	1:04:38
10	Isacco Costa	Italy	1:05:01
11	Cesare Maestri	Italy	1:05:04
12	Taylor Stack	United States	1:05:05
13	Alejandro García	Spain	1:05:19
14	Mason Coppi	United States	1:05:57
15	Manuel Innerhofer	Austria	1:06:04
16	Lorenzo Cagnati	Italy	1:06:12
17	Ibai Larrea	Spain	1:06:19
18	Isaac Masai	Uganda	1:06:24
19	Jacob Adkin	United Kingdom	1:06:35
20	Remi Leroux	Canada	1:06:54
21	Nathan Wanner	Switzerland	1:07:24
22	Theodore Klein	France	1:07:32
23	Jáchym Kovář	Czech Republic	1:07:38
24	Cam Smith	United States	1:07:58
25	Luca Merli	Italy	1:08:01
26	Hans-Peter Innerhofer	Austria	1:08:02
27	Konstantin Wedel	Germany	1:08:07
28	Julius Ott	Germany	1:08:16
29	Johannes Nussbaumer	Austria	1:08:25
30	Felix McGrath	United Kingdom	1:08:33
31	Máté Dalos	Hungary	1:08:37
32	Corentin Capelier	France	1:08:43
33	Per Christian Færøvik Grieg	Norway	1:08:57
34	Andrew Douglas	United Kingdom	1:09:07
35	Iu Net Puig	Spain	1:09:18
36	David Norris	United States	1:09:22
37	Rares Imre Miklos	Romania	1:09:29
38	Maciej Lachowski	Poland	1:09:43
39	Daniel Heschuk	Canada	1:09:48
40	Klemen Španring	Slovenia	1:09:52
41	Elias Hinge Krogsgaard	Denmark	1:10:00
42	Jeppe Aaskov Pallesen	Denmark	1:10:05
43	Jared Martin	Ireland	1:10:11
44	Romain Discher	France	1:10:13
45	Toby Batchelor	New Zealand	1:10:14
46	Nathan Pearce	Australia	1:10:31
47	Ruben Sansom	Netherlands	1:10:44
48	Maximilian Zeus	Germany	1:10:58
49	Michael Kernahan	Australia	1:10:58
50	Jules Barriod	France	1:11:13
51	Ricardo Soares Fonseca	Portugal	1:11:16
52	Lawrence Mccourt	United Kingdom	1:11:17
53	Killian Mooney	Ireland	1:11:30
54	Sebastian Falkensteiner	Austria	1:11:35
55	Pablo Van Hoorn	Netherlands	1:11:43
56	Eric Speakman	New Zealand	1:11:45
57	Gastón Nicolás Cambareri	Argentina	1:11:46
58	Jan Torrella	Spain	1:11:48
59	Cristian Rincon	Colombia	1:11:59
60	Diego Ignacio Diaz	Chile	1:12:04
61	Michael Sutton	New Zealand	1:12:11
62	Fraser Darcy	Australia	1:12:21
63	Javier Adolfo Carriqueo	Argentina	1:12:44
64	Yazid Menad	Algeria	1:12:54
65	Carlos Lopes	Portugal	1:12:57
66	Óscar Basantes	Ecuador	1:13:02
67	Paulo Macedo	Portugal	1:13:08
68	Christopher Levesque-Savard	Canada	1:13:26
69	Jean Faymonville	Belgium	1:13:32
70	Jairo Silva	Colombia	1:13:40
71	Camilo José Navas Madera	Ecuador	1:13:45
72	Luuk Wijering	Netherlands	1:13:56
73	Nikola Špoljar	Croatia	1:14:12
74	Maj Pritržnik	Slovenia	1:14:17
75	Esteban Izquierdo	Colombia	1:14:19
76	Uldis Upītis	Latvia	1:14:27
77	Daniel Dukstad	Norway	1:14:41
78	Ante Živković	Croatia	1:14:44
79	Stefan Tovilović	Serbia	1:15:01
80	Aleksa Banković	Serbia	1:15:01
81	Balázs Pernyész	Hungary	1:15:06
82	Valentin Toma	Romania	1:15:13
83	José Jorge Ubico Koose	Guatemala	1:15:24
84	Carlos José Ávile Pérez	Venezuela	1:15:29
85	Matthew Mcconnell	Ireland	1:15:34
86	Leonard Albert Mitrica	Romania	1:15:39
87	Samuël Poher	Canada	1:16:02
88	Aidan Tanti	Malta	1:16:25
89	Bruno Bullé Costa Esteves	Brazil	1:16:31
90	Valérian Lanzi	Switzerland	1:16:36
91	Lari Takanen	Finland	1:17:07
92	Alvaro Mauricio Carranza Olivo	Ecuador	1:17:11
93	David Alexander Nieva	Argentina	1:17:27
94	Jorge Montenegro Da Silva	Brazil	1:17:40
95	Zoltán Vigh	Hungary	1:18:03
96	Tiago Babo Pereira	Portugal	1:18:09
97	Eduardo De Brito Ramos	Brazil	1:18:21
98	Davide Venerucci	San Marino	1:18:29
99	Horacio Nuñez	Uruguay	1:18:34
100	Mario Alaniz	Argentina	1:18:38
101	Krešimir Mrčela	Croatia	1:19:04
102	Vaidas Ramanauskas	Lithuania	1:19:12
103	Dušan Krstić	Serbia	1:19:33
104	Artjoms Rekuņenko	Latvia	1:19:34
105	Frank Dariel Castro Perú	Cuba	1:19:42
106	Ihor Sliusarenko	Ukraine	1:19:46
107	Gediminas Viliūnas	Lithuania	1:19:59
108	Ivan Maletić	Croatia	1:20:03
109	Benjamin Rickerby	New Zealand	1:20:55
110	Kristaps Bērziņš	Latvia	1:21:09
111	Hugeseong Oh	South Korea	1:21:20
112	Lorenzo Bugli	San Marino	1:22:31
113	Donatas Jocius	Lithuania	1:22:40
114	Sagar Khemani	India	1:22:47
115	Wei-Cheng Li	Chinese Taipei	1:22:50
116	Jesus Cuevas	Bolivia	1:23:13
117	Martin Keohane	Ireland	1:23:14
118	Samuel Manuel	Philippines	1:23:16
119	Isaac Attard	Malta	1:23:27
120	Malek Leroul	Algeria	1:23:46
121	Yung-Jeng Tzeng	Chinese Taipei	1:23:54
122	Chieh-Kai Chan	Chinese Taipei	1:24:12
123	Arnas Gabrėnas	Lithuania	1:24:22
124	Po-Yu Lin	Chinese Taipei	1:24:49
125	Oleksii Babii	Ukraine	1:25:08
126	Faris Azhari Muhammad	Malaysia	1:26:02
127	Luca Censoni	San Marino	1:26:31
128	Andres Zaracho Vera	Paraguay	1:26:53
129	Chester Cheong	Singapore	1:28:15
130	Wen De Lester Tan	Singapore	1:31:09
131	Elmir Askarov	Azerbaijan	1:32:03
132	Adel Dogha	Algeria	1:32:03
133	Farrel Tes	Cambodia	1:43:15
134	Ammarith Ann	Cambodia	1:43:15
135	Jean Jacques Mok	Cambodia	1:47:23
136	Henry Yee Meng Yang	Singapore	1:49:17
	Bogdan Damian	Romania	DNF
	Jonas Soldini	Switzerland	DNF
	Max Napoleon Rohoden Jaramillo	Ecuador	DNF
	Pascual Acevedo	Uruguay	DNF
	Abel Chebet	Uganda	DNF
	Collin Van Almkerk	Netherlands	DNF

=== 2025 World Mountain Running Championships Mountain Classic (up and down) Men's Team Results ===
Rank	Country	Racers	Score
1st place, gold medalist(s)	Kenya	1 Ombogo Kiriago Philemon; 3 Paul Machoka; 5 Ken Koros	9
2nd place, silver medalist(s)	Uganda	2 Martin Kiprotich; 7 Aziz Chebet; 18 Isaac Masai	27
3rd place, bronze medalist(s)	Italy	10 Isacco Costa; 11 Cesare Maestri; 16 Lorenzo Cagnati	37
4	United States	12 Taylor Stack; 14 Mason Coppi; 24 Cam Smith	50
5	Spain	13 Alejandro García; 17 Ibai Larrea; 35 Iu Net Puig	65
6	Austria	15 Manuel Innerhofer; 26 Hans-Peter Innerhofer; 29 Johannes Nussbaumer	70
7	Great Britain	19 Jacob Adkin; 30 Felix McGrath; 34 Andrew Douglas	83
8	France	22 Theodore Klein; 32 Corentin Capelier; 44 Romain Discher	98
9	Germany	27 Konstantin Wedel; 28 Julius Ott; 48 Maximilian Zeus	103
10	Switzerland	4 Dominik Rolli; 21 Nathan Wanner; 90 Valérian Lanzi	115
11	Canada	20 Remi Leroux; 39 Daniel Heschuk; 68 Christopher Levesque-Savard	127
12	Colombia	9 Jonatha Camilo Castillo; 59 Cristian Rincon; 70 Jairo Silva	138
13	Australia	46 Nathan Pearce; 49 Michael Kernahan; 62 Fraser Darcy	157
14	New Zealand	45 Toby Batchelor; 56 Eric Speakman; 61 Michael Sutton	162
15	Netherlands	47 Ruben Sansom; 55 Pablo Van Hoorn; 72 Luuk Wijering	174
16	Ireland	43 Jared Martin; 53 Killian Mooney; 85 Matthew McConnell	181
17	Portugal	51 Ricardo Soares Fonseca; 65 Carlos Lopes; 67 Paulo Macedo	183
18	Romania	37 Rares Imre Miklos; 82 Valentin Toma; 86 Leonard Albert Mitrica	205
19	Hungary	31 Máté Dalos; 81 Balázs Pernyész; 95 Zoltán Vigh	207
20	Argentina	57 Gastón Nicolás Cambareri; 63 Javier Adolfo Carriqueo; 93 David Alexander Nieva	213
21	Ecuador	66 Óscar Basantes; 71 Camilo José Navas Madera; 92 Alvaro Mauricio Carranza Olivo	229
22	Croatia	73 Nikola Špoljar; 78 Ante Živković; 101 Krešimir Mrčela	252
23	Serbia	79 Stefan Tovilović; 80 Aleksa Banković; 103 Dušan Krstić	262
24	Brazil	89 Bruno Bullé Costa Esteves; 94 Jorge Montenegro Da Silva; 97 Eduardo De Brito Ramos	280
25	Latvia	76 Uldis Upītis; 104 Artjoms Rekuņenko; 110 Kristaps Bērziņš	290
26	Algeria	64 Yazid Menad; 120 Malek Leroul; 132 Adel Dogha	316
27	Lithuania	102 Vaidas Ramanauskas; 107 Gediminas Viliūnas; 113 Donatas Jocius	322
28	San Marino	98 Davide Venerucci; 112 Lorenzo Bugli; 127 Luca Censoni	337
29	Chinese Taipei	115 Wei-Cheng Li; 121 Yung-Jeng Tzeng; 122 Chieh-Kai Chan	358
30	Singapore	129 Chester Cheong; 130 Wen De Lester Tan; 136 Henry Yee Meng Yang	395
31	Cambodia	133 Farrel Tes; 134 Ammarith Ann; 135 Jean Jacques Mok	402

=== 2025 World Mountain Running Championships Mountain Classic (up and down) Women's Results ===
Distance 14.3 km, total ascent of 775 m, total descent of 775 m.

Rank	Name	Nationality	Time
1st place, gold medalist(s)	Nina Engelhard	Germany	1:11:00
2nd place, silver medalist(s)	Ruth Gitonga Mwihaki	Kenya	1:12:54
3rd place, bronze medalist(s)	Oria Liaci	Switzerland	1:13:15
4	Joyce Muthoni	Kenya	1:13:37
5	Lauren Gregory	United States	1:13:38
6	Rispa Cherop	Uganda	1:13:42
7	Nélie Clément	France	1:14:09
8	Gloria Chebet	Kenya	1:14:39
9	Elisa Morin	Canada	1:15:16
10	Marie Nivet	France	1:15:58
11	Axelle Genoud	Switzerland	1:16:06
12	Anna Gibson	United States	1:16:23
13	Courtney Coppinger	United States	1:16:24
14	Claudia Estevez	Spain	1:16:30
15	Scout Adkin	United Kingdom	1:16:30
16	Angela Mattevi	Italy	1:16:32
17	Anne-Marie Comeau	Canada	1:17:05
18	Alice Gaggi	Italy	1:17:27
19	Céline Aebi	Switzerland	1:17:49
20	Weronika Matuszczak	Poland	1:17:52
21	Christel Dewalle	France	1:17:55
22	Nancy Scott	United Kingdom	1:18:09
23	Arian Iveth Chia Hernández	Mexico	1:18:20
24	Julie Lelong	France	1:18:27
25	Allie McLaughlin	United States	1:18:41
26	Anna Hofer	Italy	1:19:14
27	Jessie Speedy	New Zealand	1:19:32
28	Ginary Camargo	Colombia	1:19:48
29	Kerine Cherop	Uganda	1:20:13
30	Maria Elena Aquino Espinoza	Mexico	1:20:17
31	Kate Maltby	United Kingdom	1:20:17
32	Claudine Soucie	Canada	1:20:37
33	Louise Jernberg	Sweden	1:20:52
34	Joana Soares	Portugal	1:21:00
35	Mariel Salazar	Mexico	1:21:09
36	Sara Willhoit	United Kingdom	1:21:26
37	Maia Flint	New Zealand	1:21:38
38	Rens Nijman	Netherlands	1:21:43
39	Beatrice Bianchi	Italy	1:21:51
40	Amelie Muss	Austria	1:21:55
41	Valentine Jepkoech Rutto	Kenya	1:21:59
42	Agnes Nørgård Kracht	Denmark	1:22:04
43	Flavia Van der Zon-Stutz	Switzerland	1:22:32
44	Kitti Posztós	Hungary	1:23:03
45	Tea Faber	Croatia	1:23:17
46	Madlen Kappeler	Germany	1:23:28
47	Dalia Alonso	Spain	1:23:33
48	Victoire Cravatte	Belgium	1:23:45
49	Lisa Cross	New Zealand	1:23:56
50	Julia Font	Spain	1:24:02
51	Pia Carayol Bressan	Argentina	1:25:19
52	Andreea Alina Gabor-Pîșcu	Romania	1:25:32
53	Souad Ait Salem	Algeria	1:25:57
54	Ana Martinović	Croatia	1:26:02
55	Nuša Mali	Slovenia	1:26:50
56	Deirdre Collins	Ireland	1:26:50
57	Jessica Ronan	Australia	1:27:30
58	Mirian Esperanza Puin	Ecuador	1:27:55
59	Yeni Paola Morales Pulido	Colombia	1:28:35
60	Rosa Godoy	Argentina	1:28:41
61	Sarah Mulligan	Ireland	1:28:48
62	Emily Greve Somerset	Denmark	1:29:31
63	Aušrinė Kutkaitė	Lithuania	1:29:41
64	Rocio Gisella Campanini	Argentina	1:29:47
65	Patricia Carreira	Portugal	1:29:58
66	Louise Murray	Ireland	1:30:18
67	Jo Hickman-Dunne	Ireland	1:30:40
68	Sandra Martins Bezerra	Brazil	1:30:56
69	Beatriz Alves	Portugal	1:31:11
70	Andrea Peat	New Zealand	1:31:31
71	Tanya Miley Pacheco Labrador	Venezuela	1:31:45
72	Olha Pylypiv	Ukraine	1:32:01
73	Kim Strohmann	Germany	1:32:23
74	Sandra Šrut	Croatia	1:32:28
75	Mina Kosanović	Serbia	1:32:55
76	Rocío Nathalia González	Paraguay	1:33:09
77	Lilla Jánosi	Hungary	1:33:20
78	Fatima Maria Villar	Paraguay	1:33:29
79	Daina Stonka	Latvia	1:33:32
80	Júlia Tüttő	Hungary	1:34:08
81	Antonia Sanchez Lagos	Chile	1:34:13
82	Paola Mabelis Martinez	Venezuela	1:34:38
83	Anna Herczog	Hungary	1:35:48
84	Emily Bartlett	Australia	1:36:01
85	Viktorija Striūkienė	Lithuania	1:36:06
86	Lorena Sosa	Uruguay	1:36:30
87	Paredes Myriam	Paraguay	1:36:39
88	Camila Quintulen	Argentina	1:36:45
89	Cecilia Piedra Cueva	Uruguay	1:37:05
90	Alejandra Perez	Ecuador	1:37:19
91	Maja Perišić	Croatia	1:38:05
92	Louise Souza de Lima	Brazil	1:38:36
93	Marta Meiere	Latvia	1:39:29
94	Pei-Lun Wu	Chinese Taipei	1:39:54
95	Joana Fernandes	Portugal	1:40:32
96	Toma Valeikaitė	Lithuania	1:41:02
97	Yudith Castillo	Venezuela	1:42:30
98	Nacima Messaoudi	Algeria	1:44:40
99	Charlotte Muyco	Philippines	1:45:48
100	Ineta Grytė	Lithuania	1:45:54
101	Pei Xun Woo	Singapore	1:46:19
102	Yee Leng Cheng	Malaysia	1:46:40
103	Melanie Haarring	Chinese Taipei	1:47:05
104	Yumei Chan	Singapore	1:49:43
105	Nazarena Fleitas	Uruguay	1:53:48
106	Ser Rin Lim	Malaysia	1:55:35
107	Mei Ang Yee	Malaysia	1:57:35
108	Min-Huei Huang	Chinese Taipei	1:59:58
109	Annie Teo	Singapore	2:00:40
	Martyna Młynarczyk	Poland	DNF
	Lara Hamilton	Australia	DNF
	Saibi Chebet	Uganda	DQ

=== 2025 World Mountain Running Championships Mountain Classic (up and down) Women's Team Results ===
Rank	Country	Racers	Score
1st place, gold medalist(s)	Kenya	2 Ruth Gitonga Mwihaki; 4 Joyce Muthoni; 8 Gloria Chebet	14 pts
2nd place, silver medalist(s)	United States	5 Lauren Gregory; 12 Anna Gibson; 13 Courtney Coppinger	30 pts
3rd place, bronze medalist(s)	Switzerland	3 Oria Liaci; 11 Axelle Genoud; 19 Céline Aebi	33 pts
4.	France	7 Nélie Clément; 10 Marie Nivet; 21 Christel Dewalle	38 pts
5.	Canada	9 Elisa Morin; 17 Anne-Marie Comeau; 32 Claudine Soucie	58 pts
6.	Italy	16 Angela Mattevi; 18 Alice Gaggi; 26 Anna Hofer	60 pts
7.	United Kingdom	15 Scout Adkin; 22 Nancy Scott; 31 Kate Maltby	68 pts
8.	Mexico	23 Arian Iveth Chia Hernández; 30 Maria Elena Aquino Espinoza; 35 Mariel Salazar	88 pts
9.	Spain	14 Claudia Estevez; 47 Dalia Alonso; 50 Julia Font	111 pts
10.	New Zealand	27 Jessie Speedy; 37 Maia Flint; 49 Lisa Cross	113 pts
11.	Germany	1 Nina Engelhard; 46 Madlen Kappeler; 73 Kim Strohmann	120 pts
12.	Portugal	34 Joana Soares; 65 Patricia Carreira; 69 Beatriz Alves	168 pts
13.	Croatia	45 Tea Faber; 54 Ana Martinović; 74 Sandra Šrut	173 pts
14.	Argentina	51 Pia Carayol Bressan; 60 Rosa Godoy; 64 Rocio Gisella Campanini	175 pts
15.	Ireland	56 Deirdre Collins; 61 Sarah Mulligan; 66 Louise Murray	183 pts
16.	Hungary	44 Kitti Posztós; 77 Lilla Jánosi; 80 Júlia Tüttő	201 pts
17.	Paraguay	76 Rocío Nathalia González; 78 Fatima Maria Villar; 87 Paredes Myriam	241 pts
18.	Lithuania	63 Aušrinė Kutkaitė; 85 Viktorija Striūkienė; 96 Toma Valeikaitė	244 pts
19.	Venezuela	71 Tanya Miley Pacheco Labrador; 82 Paola Mabelis Martinez; 97 Yudith Castillo	250 pts
20.	Uruguay	86 Lorena Sosa; 89 Cecilia Piedra Cueva; 105 Nazarena Fleitas	280 pts
21.	Chinese Taipei	94 Pei-Lun Wu; 103 Melanie Haarring; 108 Min-Huei Huang	305 pts
22.	Singapore	101 Pei Xun Woo; 104 Yumei Chan; 109 Annie Teo	314 pts
23.	Malaysia	102 Yee Leng Cheng; 106 Ser Rin Lim; 107 Mei Ang Yee	315 pts

=== 2025 World Mountain Running Championships Mountain Classic U20 Men's Results ===
Distance 7.8 km, total ascent of 400 m, total descent of 400 m.

Rank	Country	Racers	Score
1st place, gold medalist(s)	Titus Musau	Uganda	33:09
2nd place, silver medalist(s)	Enos Chebet	Uganda	33:26
3rd place, bronze medalist(s)	Abraham Cherotich	Uganda	33:32
4	Matthieu Bührer	Switzerland	33:44
5	Loïc Berger	Switzerland	34:26
6	Jack Sanderson	United Kingdom	34:36
7	Asher Oates	United States	35:11
8	Stefano Perardi	Italy	35:20
9	Cadel Ruthven	United States	35:35
10	Sam Bentham	United Kingdom	35:51
11	Mathieu Desboudard	France	36:06
12	Pietro Ruga	Italy	36:10
13	Ewan Busfield	United Kingdom	36:18
14	Clement Coudert	France	36:21
15	Marco Stupiggia	Italy	36:24
16	Francesco Pepe	Italy	36:26
17	Isak Drøpping	Norway	36:30
18	Maxime Corbeil	Canada	36:31
19	Noah Mcmahan	United States	36:34
20	Oscar Cransac-Chayrgues	France	36:37
21	Oliver Habáň	Czech Republic	36:38
22	Antoine Puydebois	France	36:43
23	Lennart Rössler	Germany	36:50
24	Facundo Valentin Peralta	Argentina	36:56
25	Lorick Buclin	Switzerland	37:00
26	Fabian Hennerbichler	Austria	37:02
27	José Julian Carrion Pazmiño	Ecuador	37:04
28	Rowan Taylor	United Kingdom	37:05
29	Alec Franzke	Australia	37:18
30	Max Doherty	New Zealand	37:20
31	Oscar Bourgeois	Belgium	37:23
32	Bertold Kalász	Hungary	37:24
33	Yeray Hernandez	Spain	37:24
34	Laureano Quiroga	Argentina	37:28
35	Linus Wedin	Sweden	37:30
36	Martin Chekanski	Bulgaria	37:32
37	Aleksander Głód	Poland	37:33
38	Ezekiel Wilcox	United States	37:34
39	Dániel Major	Hungary	37:36
40	Carlos García	Spain	37:39
41	Gerard Lopez	Spain	37:40
42	Benedikt Rindle	Germany	37:45
43	Finn Yore	Ireland	38:00
44	Santiago Salguero	Ecuador	38:01
45	Lukács Walter	Hungary	38:05
46	Loucas Céré	Canada	38:36
47	Eoin Mcconnell	Ireland	38:45
48	Teodor Franke	Germany	38:56
49	Pavel Zdravkov	Bulgaria	38:58
50	Robin Lefebvre	Canada	39:00
51	Žiga Jan Novak	Slovenia	39:03
52	Jonas Oliva	Switzerland	39:09
53	Rui Ferraz Brochado	Portugal	39:14
54	João Mendes Muniz	Brazil	39:25
55	Rudy Mayne	Ireland	39:27
56	Ekain Fernandez	Spain	39:34
57	Roberto Carlos Espinoza	Mexico	39:35
58	Riley Connolly	Ireland	39:36
59	William Lebel	Canada	39:44
60	Lucas Henry Huia	New Zealand	39:50
61	Abel Herrera	Ecuador	39:59
62	Rasmus Töyrylä	Finland	40:06
63	Algirdas Dienys	Lithuania	40:16
64	Domas Juknevičius	Lithuania	40:23
65	Philipp Koch	Austria	40:31
66	José Ferreira Cunha	Portugal	40:31
67	Abel Rene Chaile	Argentina	40:37
68	Luka Rodman	Slovenia	41:01
69	Mathias Mlekuž	Slovenia	41:01
70	Luís Silva Vieira	Portugal	41:20
71	Gustavo Valverde Lopes Da Silva	Brazil	41:36
72	Ken Oliver Libo-On	Philippines	42:41
73	Robert Shannon	Australia	42:42
74	Matija Maglica	Slovenia	43:04
75	Weng Tou Ip	Macau	44:01
76	Aleksandras Učkūronis	Lithuania	44:19
77	Kaio Augusto Souza Martins	Brazil	45:16
78	Tadhg Nolan	Australia	46:54
79	Rafael Mini	San Marino	47:17
80	Gonçalo Sousa Monteiro	Portugal	47:23

=== 2025 World Mountain Running Championships Mountain Classic U20 Men's Team Results ===
Rank	Country	Racers	Score
1st place, gold medalist(s)	Uganda	1 Titus Musau; 2 Enos Chebet; 3 Abraham Cherotich	6 pts
2nd place, silver medalist(s)	United Kingdom	6 Jack Sanderson; 10 Sam Bentham; 13 Ewan Busfield	29 pts
3rd place, bronze medalist(s)	Switzerland	4 Matthieu Bührer; 5 Loïc Berger; 25 Lorick Buclin	34 pts
4	Italy	8 Stefano Perardi; 12 Pietro Ruga; 15 Marco Stupiggia	35 pts
5	United States	7 Asher Oates; 9 Cadel Ruthven; 19 Noah Mcmahan	35 pts
6	France	11 Mathieu Desboudard; 14 Clement Coudert; 20 Oscar Cransac-Chayrgues	45 pts
7	Germany	23 Lennart Rössler; 42 Benedikt Rindle; 48 Teodor Franke	113 pts
8	Spain	33 Yeray Hernandez; 40 Carlos García; 41 Gerard Lopez	114 pts
9	Canada	18 Maxime Corbeil; 46 Loucas Céré; 50 Robin Lefebvre	114 pts
10	Hungary	32 Bertold Kalász; 39 Dániel Major; 45 Lukács Walter	116 pts
11	Argentina	24 Facundo Valentin Peralta; 34 Laureano Quiroga; 67 Abel Rene Chaile	125 pts
12	Ecuador	27 José Julian Carrion Pazmiño; 44 Santiago Salguero; 61 Abel Herrera	132 pts
13	Ireland	43 Finn Yore; 47 Eoin Mcconnell; 55 Rudy Mayne	145 pts
14	Australia	29 Alec Franzke; 73 Robert Shannon; 78 Tadhg Nolan	180 pts
15	Slovenia	51 Žiga Jan Novak; 68 Luka Rodman; 69 Mathias Mlekuž	188 pts
16	Portugal	53 Rui Ferraz Brochado; 66 José Ferreira Cunha; 70 Luís Silva Vieira	189 pts
17	Brazil	54 João Mendes Muniz; 71 Gustavo Valverde Lopes Da Silva; 77 Kaio Augusto Souza Martins	202 pts
18	Lithuania	63 Algirdas Dienys; 64 Domas Juknevičius; 76 Aleksandras Učkūronis	203 pts

=== 2025 World Mountain Running Championships Mountain Classic U20 Women's Results ===
Distance 7.8 km, total ascent of 400 m, total descent of 400 m.

Rank	Name	Nationality	Time
1st place, gold medalist(s)	Julia Ehrle	Germany	38:47
2nd place, silver medalist(s)	Nancy Chepkwurui	Uganda	39:24
3rd place, bronze medalist(s)	Felister Chekwemoi	Uganda	39:29
4	Vendula Šoukalová	Czech Republic	40:03
5	Licia Ferrari	Italy	40:06
6	Rahel Good	Switzerland	40:49
7	Ines Herault	Spain	40:58
8	Agnes Josefsson	Sweden	41:04
9	Nowel Cheruto	Uganda	41:09
10	Leonie Mathis	Switzerland	41:17
11	Andronicas Chebet	Uganda	41:23
12	Martina Ghisalberti	Italy	41:32
13	Alice Mugnier	France	41:36
14	Sophia Rodriguez	United States	41:45
15	Isla Paterson	United Kingdom	42:06
16	Laura Ordiales	Spain	42:26
17	Nadia Soto	Spain	42:29
18	Alice Rosa Brusin	Italy	42:42
19	Zoey Crosby	Canada	42:45
20	Jessica Taylor	United Kingdom	42:56
21	Sierra Wall	United States	43:03
22	Klara Močnik	Slovenia	43:04
23	Klara Velepec	Slovenia	43:11
24	Manon Duprat	France	43:19
25	Ruby Ihmels	United States	43:30
26	Ines Rozand	France	43:49
27	Henriette Radzikowski	Switzerland	43:58
28	Eva Nikolova	Bulgaria	44:10
29	Manca Mlekuž	Slovenia	44:28
30	Aricia Glauser	Switzerland	44:30
31	Amelie Lane	United Kingdom	44:31
32	Hannah Lösel	Germany	44:33
33	Anna Desgardin	France	44:34
34	Hania Czebreszuk	United Kingdom	44:38
35	Bronwen Rees-Jones	New Zealand	44:38
36	Ana Novak	Slovenia	44:48
37	Korinna Katona	Hungary	44:56
38	Abby Stone	United States	45:27
39	Abby Smith	Ireland	45:34
40	Camilla Bonariva	Italy	45:56
41	Dorottya Jázmin Juhász	Hungary	46:16
42	Bridie Restieaux	New Zealand	46:23
43	Sinead Farrell	Ireland	47:14
44	Melissa Aguayo	Ecuador	48:14
45	Jessica Anne McNeilly	New Zealand	48:40
46	Anna McGookin	Ireland	48:48
47	Ena Belaćević	Serbia	48:54
48	Alaoise Geraghty	Ireland	49:11
49	Vanda Lövei	Hungary	49:22
50	Mar Espartero	Spain	50:36
51	Domenica Damaris Lopez Lluay	Ecuador	51:18
52	Mariana Saltão	Portugal	51:26
53	Danna Lily Pérez Lara	Ecuador	52:42
54	Brenda Fabiana Insauralde	Argentina	52:55
55	Mina Belaćević	Serbia	53:28
56	Julieta Gregório Gomes	Portugal	53:36
57	Ruby Smith	Australia	53:50
58	Agustina Silva	Uruguay	55:21
59	Evan Dian Sitoy	Philippines	56:16
60	Nicole Guachamin	Ecuador	58:11
61	Rita Lopes	Portugal	58:55
	Beatriz Costa Claro	Portugal	DNF
	Karolina Tyman	Poland	DNF

=== 2025 World Mountain Running Championships Mountain Classic U20 Women's Team Results ===
Rank	Country	Racers	Score
1st place, gold medalist(s)	Uganda	2 Nancy Chepkwurui; 3 Felister Chekwemoi; 9 Nowel Cheruto	14 pts
2nd place, silver medalist(s)	Italy	5 Licia Ferrari; 12 Martina Ghisalberti; 18 Alice Rosa Brusin	35 pts
3rd place, bronze medalist(s)	Spain	7 Ines Herault; 16 Laura Ordiales; 17 Nadia Soto	40 pts
4.	Switzerland	6 Rahel Good; 10 Leonie Mathis; 27 Henriette Radzikowski	43 pts
5.	United States	14 Sophia Rodriguez; 21 Sierra Wall; 25 Ruby Ihmels	60 pts
6.	France	13 Alice Mugnier; 24 Manon Duprat; 26 Ines Rozand	63 pts
7.	United Kingdom	15 Isla Paterson; 20 Jessica Taylor; 31 Amelie Lane	66 pts
8.	Slovenia	22 Klara Močnik; 23 Klara Velepec; 29 Manca Mlekuž	74 pts
9.	New Zealand	35 Bronwen Rees-Jones; 42 Bridie Restieaux; 45 Jessica Anne McNeilly	122 pts
10.	Hungary	37 Korinna Katona; 41 Dorottya Jázmin Juhász; 49 Vanda Lövei	127 pts
11.	Ireland	39 Abby Smith; 43 Sinead Farrell; 46 Anna McGookin	128 pts
12.	Ecuador	44 Melissa Aguayo; 51 Domenica Damaris Lopez Lluay; 53 Danna Lily Pérez Lara	148 pts
13.	Portugal	52 Mariana Saltão; 56 Julieta Gregório Gomes; 61 Rita Lopes	169 pts
