= Felister Chekwemoi =

Ugandan athlete

Personal information
- Nationality: Ugandan
- Born: 15 August 2007 (age 18)

Sport
- Sport: Athletics
- Event(s): Cross country, Middle-distance running, Long distance running
Medal record
Women's athletics
Representing Uganda
World Cross Country Championships
Gold medal – first place	2026 Tallahassee	U20 team
World Mountain Running Championships
Gold medal – first place	2025 Canfranc	U20 Mountain Team
Bronze medal – third place	2025 Canfranc	U20 Mountain

Felister Chekwemoi (born 15 August 2007) is a Ugandan middle-, and long-distance and cross country runner. She was a double medalist in the U20 races at the 2025 World Mountain and Trail Running Championships.

== Career ==
Chekwemoi placed fourteenth in the individual competition as she competed for Uganda in the U20 race at the 2023 World Athletics Cross Country Championships in Bathurst, Australia, as the Ugandan women's U20 team placed fourth overall.

In July 2023, she was runner-up to Knight Aciru at the Ugandan national championships over 1500 metres. She was runner-up again at the 2024 Ugandan Athletics Championships over 1500 metres in June 2024. In March 2025, she lowered her personal best over 1500 metres to 4:14.72, whilst competing in Kampala.

Chekwemoi placed seventh over 1500 metres at the 2025 African U20 Championships in Abeokuta, Nigeria, in July 2025 behind compatriot Nancy Chepkwurui. She won the bronze medal in the U20 individual race and the gold medal in the team race with Chepkwurui at the 2025 World Mountain and Trail Running Championships in Spain in September 2025.

Chekwemoi was selected to represent Uganda in the U20 race at the 2026 World Athletics Cross Country Championships in Tallahassee, Florida. She had a top-ten finish in the U20 women's race, helping Uganda to win the gold medal in the team event.
