= Martin Kiprotich =

Ugandan athlete

Personal information
- Nationality: Ugandan
- Born: Martin Magengo Kiprotich; 6 April 2003 (age 23)

Sport
- Sport: Athletics
- Event(s): Cross country, long distance running

Achievements and titles
- Personal best: 10000m: 28:46.10 (2023)
Medal record
Men's athletics
Representing Uganda
World Cross Country Championships
Bronze medal – third place	2023 Bathurst	Senior team
World Mountain Running Championships
Silver medal – second place	2025 Canfranc	Mountain
Silver medal – second place	2025 Canfranc	Mountain Team

Martin Magengo Kiprotich (born 6 April 2003) is an Ugandan cross country and long distance runner.

== Career ==
He was runner-up at the Ugandan U20 Cross Country Championships in 2022. A tendon injury prevented him from competing at the 2022 World U20 Championships in August 2022. However, he recovered to win the Senior Ugandan Cross Country Championships in Tororo in December 2022, at the age of 19 years-old.

He finished eighteenth and was a bronze medal winner in the men's team competition at the 2023 World Athletics Cross Country Championships in Bathurst, Australia.

He ran at the 2024 World Athletics Cross Country Championships in Belgrade.

He competed in the 10,000 metres at the 2024 Summer Olympics in Paris in August 2024.

Kiprotich won the silver medal in the mountain classic individual race and the silver medal in the team race at the 2025 World Mountain and Trail Running Championships in Spain in September 2025.
