= Nélie Clément =

French long-distance runner (born 2003)

Personal information
- Born: 10 February 2003 (age 23) Grenoble, France
- Height: 150 cm (4 ft 11 in)
- Weight: 40 kg (88 lb)

Sport
- Country: France
- Sport: Athletics
- Events: Long-distance running; Cross country running
Medal record
Representing France
Women's athletics
European Cross Country Championships
Gold medal – first place	2025 Lagoa	U23 team
Women's mountain running
World Championships
Silver medal – second place	2025 Canfranc	Team uphill
European Off-Road Championships
Bronze medal – third place	2026 Kamnik	9km uphill

Nélie Clément (born 13 July 2003) is French long-distance, mountain, and cross country runner. A winner in 2025 in the WMRA World Cup and a silver medalist in the team uphill race at the 2025 World Mountain and Trail Running Championships, Clément won the gold medal in the under-23 team event at the 2025 European Cross Country Championships.

== Biography ==
Clément is from Gap, Hautes-Alpes, and trained as a member of GH2A and the Hautes-Alpes Elite club. She won French age-group titles in 2022 on the track and the roads, and was selected for the French junior team for the World Mountain Running Championships held in Chiang Mai, Thailand in November 2022.

In 2023, she placed fourth in the U23 category at the French Cross Country Championships. In March 2024, she was the runner-up at the French junior cross-country championships, having achieved a Top 10 overall finish in the women's race. In 2024, she won three gold medals, beckoning French Champion in mountain running and vertical climbing in the senior category as well as in the team event, at the French mountain running championships.

In July 2025, she won a stage of the WMRA World Cup. In 2025, she placed eighth individually and won a silver medal with the French team in the Team uphill race in Canfranc, Spain, at the 2025 World Mountain and Trail Running Championships.

Clément won the gold medal in the under-23 team event at the 2025 European Cross Country Championships in Portugal, placing ninth overall as the third French finisher behind Julia David-Smith and Camille Place.

In June 2026, she won the bronze medal in the 9km uphill race at the European Athletics Off-Road Running Championships in Kamnik, Slovenia.
