= Anna Gibson =

American ski mountaineer (born 1999)

- Gibson at Sierre-Zinal 2026

Personal information
- Born: May 7, 1999 (age 27) Jackson, Wyoming, U.S.
- Height: 1.65 m (5 ft 5 in)

Sport
- Country: United States
- Sport: Track; Mountain running; Ski mountaineering

Anna Gibson (born May 7, 1999) is an American multi-sport athlete (track, mountain running, ski mountaineer). She represented the United States at the 2026 Winter Olympics.

== Early life and education ==
Gibson was born to Les and Maggie Gibson, and has one older sister, Reily. She attended Jackson Hole High School where she was named the valedictorian of her class. She was a multi-sport athlete, participating in track, cross country, and Nordic skiing, and won 17 overall Wyoming state titles. During her senior year she won the Wyoming 4A state cross country title and on the track won the 800-meters, 1,600-meters, 3,200-meters, and the 4x800-meter relay. She set the Wyoming state cross country record and the state 1,600-meter record. She was subsequently named the 2017 Gatorade Wyoming Track Athlete of the Year and the Gatorade Wyoming Cross Country Runner of the Year.

She then attended the University of Washington where she ran cross country and track and field, excelling in middle-distance running. In 2024, she made the 1500 meter semifinal at the U.S. Olympic Trials.

== Career ==
Gibson has had a successful mountain running career, with podium finishes in the Broken Arrow Skyrace (23 km) in 2023 and 2025 and winning Gorge Waterfalls 30 km in 2025. She finished third at the 2025 World Mountain and Trail Running Championships uphill race in 2025.

During the opening race of the 2025–26 ISMF Ski Mountaineering World Cup on December 6, 2025, Gibson finished in first place in the mixed relay, along with Cameron Smith. She had only began ski mountaineering six months prior to the competition. They became the first American team in World Cup history to medal in the event. With the win, they earned an Olympic quota spot and qualified to represent the United States at the 2026 Winter Olympics. Gibson and Smith finished fourth place in the mixed relay.
