= Nina Engelhard =

German mountain runner

Personal information
- Born: Kassel, Germany

Sport
- Sport: Athletics
- Event: Long-distance running
- Club: PSV Grün-Weiß Kassel
- Coached by: Udo Engelbrecht
Medal record
Mountain running
Representing Germany
World Championships
Winner	2025 Canfranc	Uphill
Winner	2025 Canfranc	Up&Down
European Championships
Winner	2024 Annecy	Uphill
Winner	2024 Annecy	Up&Down

Nina Engelhard is a German female long-distance runner and mountain runner, double world champion at the World Mountain Running Championships (2025) and double champion at the European Mountain Running Championships (2024).

== Biography ==
Engelhard won the 2024 European Mountain Running Championships, both in the Uphill/Vertical and Up&Down/Classic categories. She also won the 2024 Grossglocker Mountain Run, a WMRA World Cup event. In 2025, she won the German Mountain Running Championships and the World Mountain Running Championships, the latter again in both the Uphill/Vertical and Up&Down/Classic categories.
