= Jacob Adkin =

Scottish long-distance runner (born 1996)

- Adkin in 2019

Personal information
- Nationality: British (Scottish)
- Born: 18 May 1996 (age 30) Melrose, Scotland

Sport
- Sport: Athletics
- Events: Long-distance running, Mountain running
- Club: Moorfoot Runners
- Coached by: Robbie Simpson
Medal record
Representing Great Britain
Men's mountain running
European Mountain Running Championships
Gold medal – first place	2019 Zermatt	Uphill
European Off-Road Championships
Gold medal – first place	2026 Kamnik	Uphill

Jacob Adkin (born 18 May 1996) is a British long-distance and mountain runner from Scotland. Adkin won the uphill title at the European Mountain Running Championships in 2019, and won the gold medal in the uphill race at the 2026 European Athletics Off-Road Running Championships. He is the brother of Scout Adkin.

== Biography ==
Adkin was born at Borders General Hospital and raised in Peebles, where he was educated at Priorsford Primary and Peebles High School before studying for a mechanical engineering degree at Edinburgh University.

Adkin began mountain running as a child, when he would liven up family walks by running to the summits of climbs. His sister Scout Adkin also competes with both training with Moorfoot Runners in Peebles. His first hill race was the Scald Law junior event in the Pentlands, at the age of 11 years-old. By the age of 16, he had won his first Scottish junior hill title. He represented Scotland for the first time in 2013, and made his debut representing Great Britain the following year, and competed in back-to-back European and World junior championships in 2014 and 2015. He also began working with former international runner Robbie Simpson as a coach.

In 2018, Adkin placed sixth at the 2018 World Mountain Running Championships in Andorra. Adkin won the uphill title at the European Mountain Running Championships in 2019. At the 2024 European Mountain Running Championships in Annecy, France, Adkin was part of the medal winning British team, and won the individual silver medal behind Joe Steward in the uphill race. The following year, he had a fifth place finish in the uphill race at the 2025 World Mountain and Trail Running Championships in Canfranc, Pyrenees.

Adkin won the gold medal in the uphill race at the European Athletics Off-Road Running Championships in June 2026. Later that summer, he finished fourth at the Sierre-Zinal race in Switzerland, in a time of 2:30:49, the fastest time recorded by a Briton ever in the race. That year, he was nominated for British Male Athlete of the Year by Athletics Weekly.
