= European Athletics Off-Road Running Championships =

The European Athletics Off-Road Running Championships are the successor of what were previously the European Mountain Running Championships. First held in 2022 in El Paso, Spain, the biennial competition is now on its third edition. The 2026 European Athletics Off Road Running Championships were held in Kamnik, Slovenia, from the 5–6 June 2026.

== 2026 Senior Results- Women ==
Race	1st	2nd	3rd	Team Title Winner
9km uphill	Morven GOODRUM 🇬🇧	Laura HOTTENROTT 🇩🇪	Nélie CLÉMENT 🇫🇷	Great Britain and Northern Ireland
52km trail	Judith WYDER 🇨🇭	María LA CHICA 🇪🇸	Emma ERIKSSON 🇸🇪	Switzerland
13km uphill downhill	Hanna GRÖBER 🇩🇪	Nancy SCOTT 🇬🇧	Nélie CLÉMENT 🇫🇷	Switzerland

== 2026 Senior Results- Men ==
Race	1st	2nd	3rd	Team Title Winner
9km uphill	Jacob ADKIN 🇬🇧	Petter ENGDAHL 🇸🇪	Andrea ELIA 🇮🇹	Switzerland
52km trail	Frédéric TRANCHAND 🇫🇷	Daniel PATTIS 🇮🇹	Antoine CHARVOLIN 🇫🇷	France
13km uphill downhill	Jan TORRELLA 🇪🇸	Dominik ROLLI 🇨🇭	Petter ENGDAHL 🇸🇪	Italy

Jan Torrella, the youngest senior medallist of the Championship at 22 years old, won Spain's first gold medal in the history of the European Athletics Off Road Running Championships.

== 2026 Medal Table ==
Country	Gold	Silver	Bronze	Total
France	8	5	4	17
Switzerland	4	2	2	8
Germany	4	1	1	6
Great Britain and Northern Ireland	3	1	3	7
Spain	1	3	5	9
Italy	1	3	3	7
Czechia	1	0	0	1
Sweden	0	1	2	3
Hungary	0	1	0	1
Poland	0	1	0	1
