= Sara Alonso Martínez =

Spanish trail and mountain runner (born 1999)

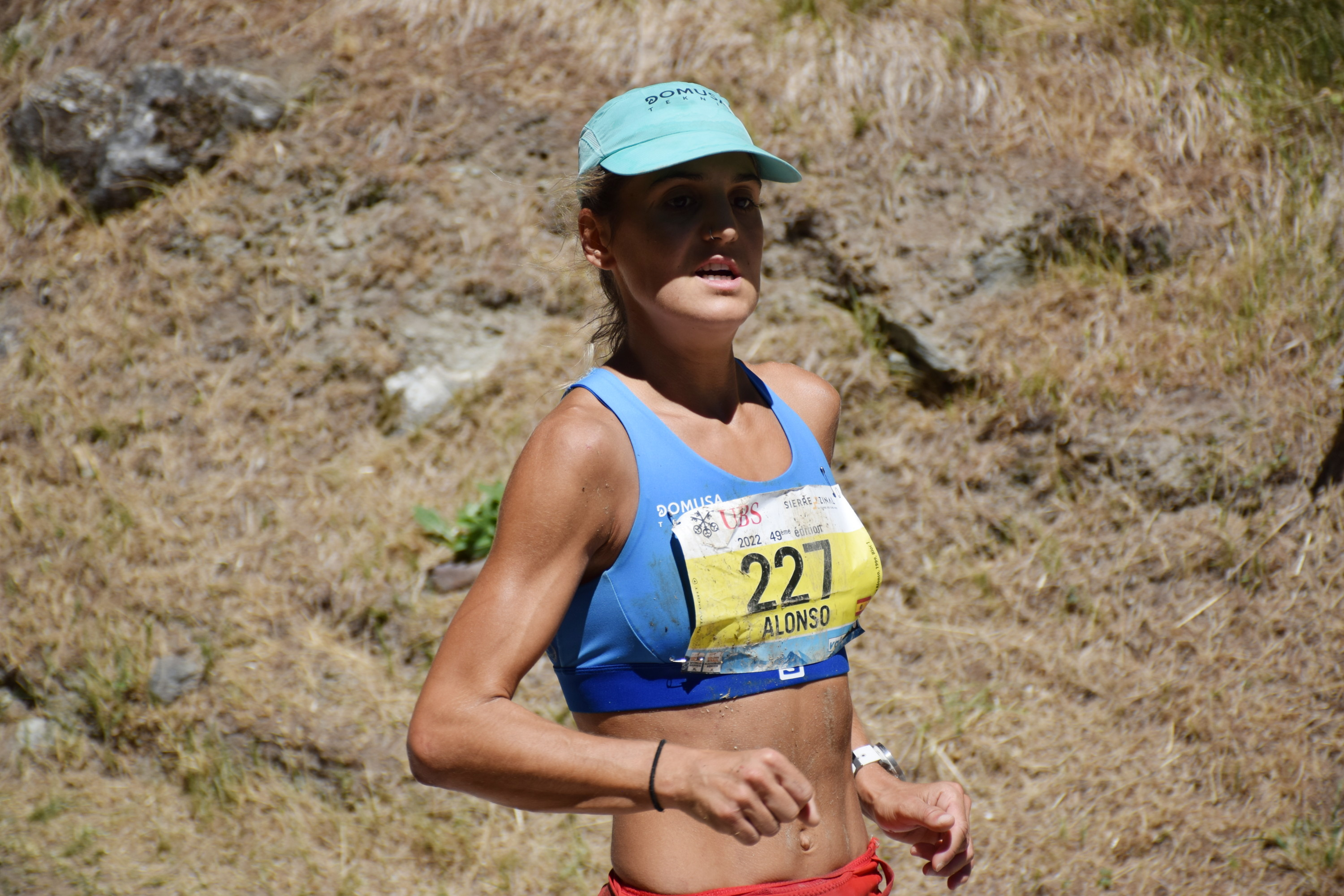

Personal information
- Nationality: Spanish
- Born: Sara Alonso Martínez; 17 April 1999 (age 27) San Sebastián, Gipuzkoa, Spain
- Occupations: Trail and mountain runner
- Years active: 2020–present

Sport
- Sport: Trail running, Mountain running
- Events: Marathon and short trail

Sara Alonso Martínez (born 1999) is a Spanish long-distance runner who specialises in trail running and mountain running. A former 3,000 metres steeplechase athlete, she became Spanish trail running champion in 2022 and the same year won both the Transgrancanaria Marathon and the Marathon du Mont Blanc, briefly leading the Golden Trail World Series standings; in 2025 she won the Zegama-Aizkorri mountain marathon, took silver at the 2025 World Mountain and Trail Running Championships in Canfranc and finished as runner-up in the Golden Trail World Series.

== Early life and athletics ==
While studying a double degree in physiotherapy and Physical Activity and Sport Sciences at the University of Lleida, she made the transition to mountain running through a class trip to the Pyrenees. She joined the Salomon España trail team in 2019 after contacting them via Instagram, and made her debut on the Golden Trail World Series in 2021. A full-time professional athlete, she has reported training around 130 to 140 kilometres a week in the build-up to her main races. Winning the Zegama-Aizkorri mountain marathon, on home soil in the Basque Country, has been described as a long-standing personal goal of hers.

== Career ==
=== 2022: Breakthrough season ===
Alonso opened 2022 by winning the marathon distance of the Transgrancanaria in 3:30:10, taking her first major international title ahead of South Africa's Toni McCann and Spain's Anna Comet. A few months later she earned a podium finish at the Zegama-Aizkorri mountain marathon, and on 4 June 2022 she was crowned Spanish trail running champion at Riópar (Albacete), leading a sweep for Bilbao Atletismo alongside teammates Onditz Iturbe and Yolanda Martín. A week later she won the Olla Vertical de Núria, a 3.78 km vertical race with 949 metres of positive elevation rising from the Sanctuary of Núria to the summit of Puigmal.

On 26 June 2022 Alonso won the Marathon du Mont Blanc, a 42-kilometre race finishing in the centre of Chamonix, in 4:14:49, more than five minutes ahead of New Zealand's Caitlin Fielder. The result gave her her first Golden Trail World Series victory and the provisional lead of the circuit. She finished the season third in the Golden Trail World Series overall standings. At the end of 2022 she announced the end of her partnership with Salomon España and subsequently signed with Asics.

=== 2025: Zegama win, Canfranc silver and Golden Trail runner-up ===
After missing the 2023 season with a stress fracture and the 2024 Zegama marathon due to pneumonia, Alonso opened the 2025 Golden Trail World Series season with victory in the Kobe Trail in Kobe, Japan, on 19 April, finishing in 2:53:57 ahead of Romania's Madalina Florea and Spain's Malen Osa. Her return to Zegama after two consecutive missed editions was widely covered in the Spanish press, and on 25 May 2025 she led the race from start to finish to win her home mountain marathon in 4:27:25, ahead of Switzerland's Judith Wyder and her compatriot Malen Osa.

In July 2025, while training in the Pyrenees, Alonso was charged from behind by a cow and sustained a fractured sixth rib, forcing her to withdraw from Sierre-Zinal and the OCC race of the Ultra-Trail du Mont-Blanc.

She returned later in the summer, finishing fifth in the OCC at UTMB, before competing at the 2025 World Mountain and Trail Running Championships in Canfranc, where, on 26 September, she took the silver medal in the short trail (44.4-kilometre) race in 5:38:15, behind Tove Alexandersson and ahead of Britain's Naomi Lang by 39 seconds; the Spanish team also won silver behind Sweden. On 11 October she finished third at the Ledro Sky Trentino Grand Finale, the closing event of the 2025 Golden Trail World Series, sealing the runner-up position in the overall standings (913 points), behind Madalina Florea (958) and ahead of Lauren Gregory.

=== 2026 season ===
Alonso opened her 2026 campaign in the Skyrunner World Series. In March she won Acantilados del Norte in La Palma, the third round of the circuit, repeating Spain's double victory alongside Manuel Merillas. On 11 April 2026 she won the Calamorro Skyrace in Benalmádena in 3:25:42, taking her second consecutive World Series victory and the lead in the women's overall standings. She subsequently turned her attention to the defence of her Zegama-Aizkorri title, scheduled for May 2026.
