= Abraham Cherotich =

Ugandan athlete

Personal information
- Nationality: Ugandan
- Born: 8 August 2007 (age 18)

Sport
- Sport: Athletics
- Event(s): Cross country, long distance running

Achievements and titles
- Personal best(s): 1500m: 3:56.41 (2023); 3000m: 8:31.40 (2024); 5000m: 14:09.63 (2025); Road; 10km: 29:32 (2025)
Medal record
Men's athletics
Representing Uganda
World Cross Country Championships
Silver medal – second place	2026 Tallahassee	U20 team
World Mountain Running Championships
Gold medal – first place	2025 Canfranc	U20 Mountain Team
Bronze medal – third place	2025 Canfranc	U20 Mountain

Abraham Cherotich (born 8 August 2007) is a Ugandan cross country and long-distance runner. He was a double medalist in the U20 races at the 2025 World Mountain and Trail Running Championships.

== Career ==
As a seventeen-year-old, Cherotich won the 2025 Stadsloop door Appingedam in the Netherlands in June 2025, running the 10 km course in 29:38.

Cherotich won the bronze medal in the U20 individual race and the gold medal in the team race at the 2025 World Mountain and Trail Running Championships in Spain in September 2025.

Cherotich won the Ugandan national under-20 cross country trials in Mbale in November 2025. He was subsequently selected to represent Uganda in the U20 race at the 2026 World Athletics Cross Country Championships in Tallahassee, Florida. He placed fifth overall in the individual U20 race, and was a silver medalist with Uganda in the U20 team event.
