= Nancy Chepkwurui =

Ugandan middle-distance runner

Personal information
- Born: 14 June 2007 (age 19)

Sport
- Sport: Athletics
- Event(s): Middle-distance running, Steeplechase, Cross country running

Achievements and titles
- Personal best(s): 1500m: 4:13.55 (Kampala, 2025); 3000m: 9:32.60 (Kampala, 2024); 5000m: 17:22.17 (Namboole, 2023); 3000m S'chase: 9:47.47 (Lima, 2024)
Medal record
Women's athletics
Representing Uganda
World Cross Country Championships
Gold medal – first place	2026 Tallahassee	U20 team
African U20 Championships
Gold medal – first place	2025 Abeokuta	1500m
World Mountain Running Championships
Gold medal – first place	2025 Canfranc	U20 Mountain Team
Silver medal – second place	2025 Canfranc	U20 Mountain

Nancy Chepkwurui (born 14 June 2007) is an Ugandan steeplechaser, middle-distance and cross country runner. She became Ugandan national champion in the 3000 metres steeplechase in 2025, as well as the 2025 African U20 Champion over 1500 metres, and was a gold medalist in the U20 team event at the 2025 World Mountain and Trail Running Championships.

== Career ==
Chepkwurui placed fifth in the 3000 metres steeplechase representing Uganda at the 2024 World Athletics U20 Championships in Lima, Peru.

Chepkwurui was a gold medalist over 1500 metres at the 2025 African U20 Championships in Abeokuta, Nigeria in July 2025. Later that month, she won the 3000 metres steeplechase at the Uganda Athletics Championships in Kampala. She won the silver medal behind Germany's Julia Ehrle in the U20 individual race and won the gold medal in the team race at the 2025 World Mountain and Trail Running Championships in Spain in September 2025.

In January 2026, she was confirmed in the Uganda U20 team for the 2026 World Athletics Cross Country Championships in Tallahassee, where she placed twelfth overall.
