= Matthew McConnell =

Irish rugby league footballer

Matt McConnell
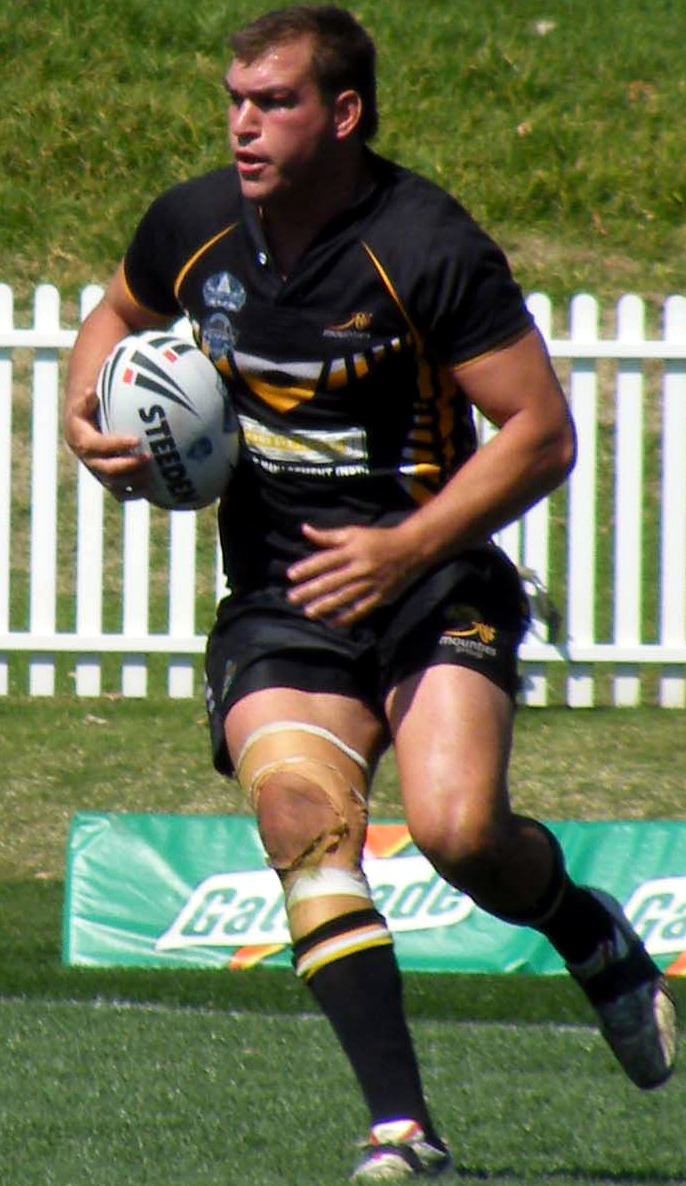

Personal information
- Full name: Matthew McConnell

Playing information
- Position: Second-row
Club
Years	Team	Pld	T	G	FG	P
≤2004–≥04	Barrow Raiders
Representative
Years	Team	Pld	T	G	FG	P
2004	Ireland	3

Matthew McConnell is a professional rugby league footballer who played in the 2000s. He played at representative level for Ireland, and at club level for Barrow Raiders, as a second-row.

== International honours ==
Matt McConnell won caps for Ireland while at Barrow Raiders 2004 3-caps.
