= Hillary Allen =

American ultrarunner and endurance athlete (born 1988)

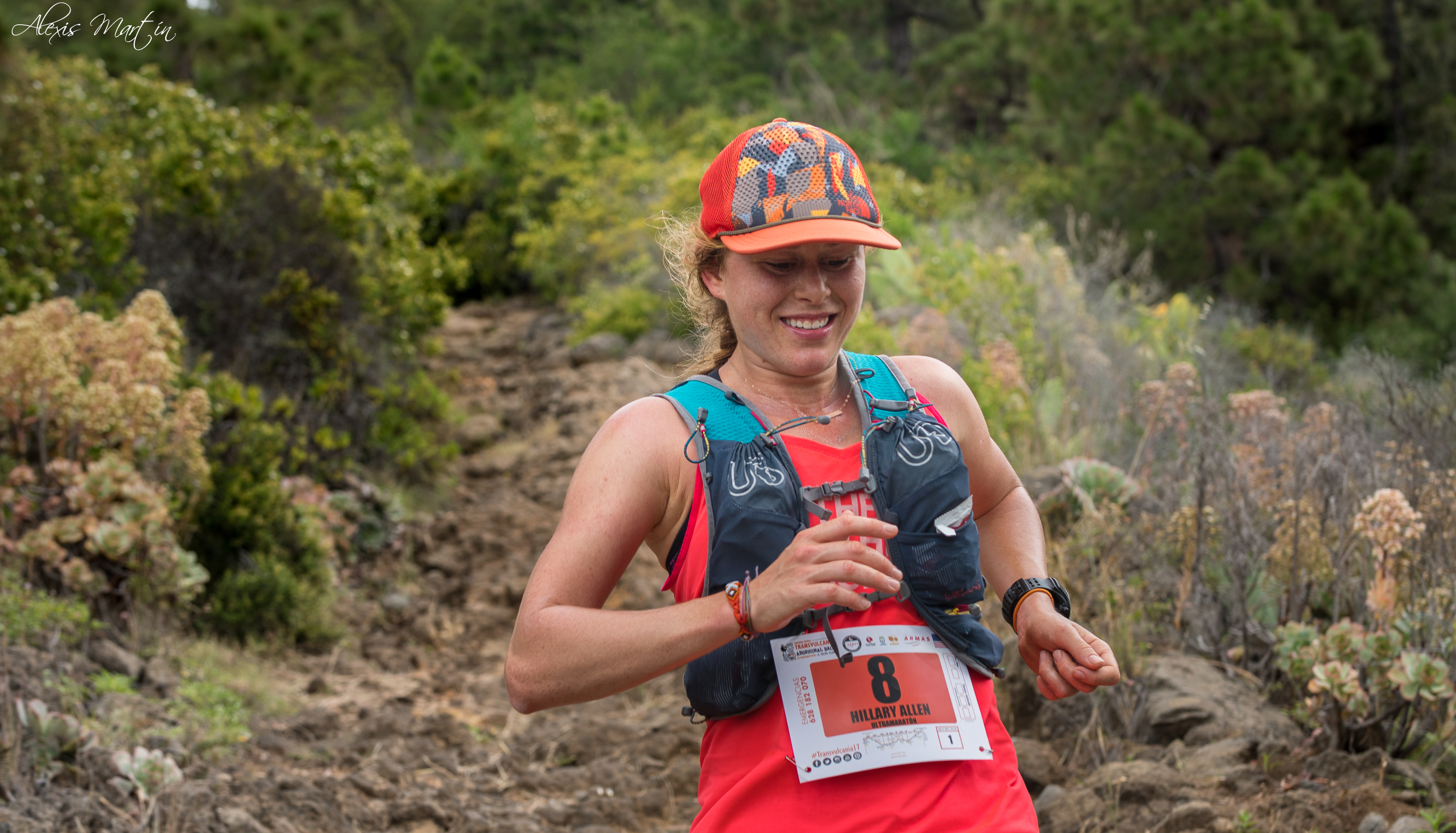
- Hillary Allen at 2017 Transvulcania.

Personal information
- Nickname: Hilly Goat
- National team: USA
- Born: August 26, 1988 (age 38) Fort Collins, Colorado
- Occupations: Professional ultramarathon runner, author, multisport athlete

Sport
- Sport: Sky running, ultramarathon, gravel cycling

Hillary Allen is an American professional ultrarunner and endurance athlete. She was previously sponsored by The North Face and is currently sponsored by Brooks Running.

== Career ==
Allen began trail running while she was studying for her PhD in science, but shortly after started competing—and winning—races. She quickly went on to become an accomplished high-altitude trail runner.

In 2017 Allen was ranked one of the top runners in the world when she suffered a near-fatal accident while competing in the Hamperroken Skyrace in Tromsø, Norway. The athlete fell 150 feet off a ridge, breaking both arms, two vertebrae, several ribs, and bones in her feet. Allen, nicknamed "Hillygoat," endured a year of physical and mental recovery before returning to the sport to compete in the Broken Arrow Vertical kilometer race in mid-2018. She has acknowledged that there were times when death seemed easier than recovering.

Two years after her accident, Allen returned to compete in the Hamperroken Skyrace and conquered the course that almost killed her. In 2019, she gave a TedX talk about her recovery titled "You Can Challenge the Impossible." One of Allen's goals is to inspire more women to get into trail running.

Allen is a multi-sport athlete, adding Gravel racing to her portfolio starting in 2019 at Unbound Gravel and the Oregon Trail Gravel Grinder.

Allen qualified for Team USA for the 2025 World Mountain Running Championships Uphill Race at the 2025 Broken Arrow Ascent.

== Book ==
She is the author of Out and Back: A Runner's Story of Survival Against All Odds.
