= Lauren Gregory =

American cross country runner (born 1999)

Lauren Gregory (born July 25, 1999) is an American ultra trail runner. She is the 2026 winner of the Orsières-Champex-Chamonix, the 50K UTMB World Series Finals race. In 2026 the race was actually 60K. In 2025, Gregory won the Golden Trail Series final.

Gregory competed for the University of Arkansas Razorbacks, where she was a scoring member of the 2019 Cross Country Championship team. The team also won the 2019, 2021 and 2023 NCAA Indoor Championships with Gregory contributing; as a freshman getting 3 points for a 7th in the 3000, after COVID on the 2021 silver medal winning Distance Medley Relay, delivering them the lead after her opening 1200, as well as her individual silver in the 3000 meters in 9:01.67, just .2 behind Courtney Wayment. She duplicated the point total in 2023 with the DMR, her 4:31.36 fastest split in the 1600 eating away 7 seconds, but not quite enough to catch Juliette Whittaker, and a second place in the Mile in 4:34.24.

While at Fort Collins High School in Fort Collins, Colorado, she won three state Cross Country Championships and four track individual championships. She finished third at Nike Cross Nationals behind fellow Coloradan Brie Oakley, who she had beaten two weeks earlier while winning the Southwest Regional.

Gregory's super power is her ability to run up hill, exhibited in Colorado's notoriously hilly state course and carrying forward into her professional career.

Gregory has taken the example from her friend and training partner in Boulder, Colorado, Allie Ostrander and started a YouTube channel.
