= Julia Ehrle =

German long-distance runner

Personal information
- Born: 12 August 2007 (age 18)

Sport
- Sport: Athletics
- Event(s): Long-distance running, Cross country running
Medal record
Women's athletics
Representing Germany
European U20 Championships
Bronze medal – third place	2025 Tampere	5000 m
European U18 Championships
Silver medal – second place	2024 Banská Bystrica	3000 m
World Mountain Running Championships
Gold medal – first place	2025 Canfranc	U20 Mountain Classic

Julia Ehrle (born 12 August 2007) is a German long-distance and cross country runner. She won the gold medal in the women's under-20 race at the 2025 World Mountain and Trail Running Championships.

== Biography ==
From Villingen in Baden-Württemberg, Ehrle won her first German age-group national title at the German Youth Athletics Championships in Rostock as a 15-year-old, when she won the under-18 3000 metres race in July 2023.

Ehrle was a silver medalist over 3000 metres at the 2024 European Athletics U18 Championships in Banská Bystrica, Slovakia. She became the U20 European Mountain Running Champion as a 17-year-old, and won the under-20 race at the Sparkassen Cross in Pforzheim in November 2024. She placed fourth in the under-20 race at the 2024 European Cross Country Championships in Antalya, Turkey.

Ehrle was a bronze medalist over 5000 metres at the 2025 European Athletics U20 Championships in Tampere, Finland, running a personal best of 15:44.06, her first time under sixteen minutes in just her fifth race at the distance.

She won the gold medal in the U20 women’s race at the 2025 World Mountain and Trail Running Championships. That year, she won the German under-20 cross country championships. She was selected for the 2025 European Cross Country Championships in Portugal.

In June 2026, Ehrle won the U20 up-and-downhill mountain race at the European Athletics Off-Road Running Championships in Ljubljana-Kamnik, Slovenia, also winning the bronze medal in the uphill race.
