= Anne-Marie Comeau =

Canadian cross-country skier

Personal information
- Born: 1 June 1996 (age 30) Quebec City, Quebec, Canada

Sport
- Sport: Skiing
- Club: Club Nordique Mont Sainte-Anne

World Cup career
- Seasons: 1 – (2013)
- Indiv. starts: 2
- Indiv. podiums: 0
- Team starts: 0
- Team podiums: 0
- Overall titles: 0
- Discipline titles: 0
- Updated on 25 January 2019

Anne-Marie Comeau (born 1 June 1996) is a Canadian cross-country skier. She competed in the women's 15 kilometre skiathlon at the 2018 Winter Olympics where she finished 48th. She competed for Canada at the FIS Nordic World Ski Championships 2017 in Lahti, Finland. She is also a cross-country & Marathon runner.

== Cross-country skiing results ==
All results are sourced from the International Ski Federation (FIS).

=== Olympic Games ===
Year	Age	10 km individual	15 km skiathlon	30 km mass start	Sprint	4 × 5 km relay	Team sprint
2018	21	62	48	DNF	—	13	—

=== World Cup ===
==== Season standings ====
Season	Age	Discipline standings			Ski Tour standings		
Season	Age	Overall	Distance	Sprint	Nordic Opening	Tour de Ski	World Cup Final
2013	16	NC	NC	—	—	—	—

== Personal bests ==
Personal bests by events
Event	Time	Location
10,000 metres	33 mins 13 s 89	Canada, Burnaby
Half marathon	1 h 11 mins 30 s	United States, Congers
Marathon	2 h 34 mins 44 s	Canada, Toronto Waterfront Marathon 15/10/2023
