= Isabell Speer =

Austrian trail runner

Personal information
- Born: August 12, 1992 (age 34)

Sport
- Country: Austria
- Sport: Trail running, mountain running, skyrunning
- Events: Mountain running, short trail, 50K trail
- Club: LAC Salzburg
- Team: Salomon DACH

Isabell Speer (August 12, 1992) is an Austrian trail runner, mountain runner and skyrunning athlete, sponsored by Salomon Group.

== Running career ==
Speer is based in Salzburg and competes for LAC Salzburg.

Speer emerged in Austrian trail-running media as a Salzburg-based athlete during the early 2020s. Kronen Zeitung described her as a local runner at the Salzburg Trailrunning Festival, while Running Schritti reported that she was named "Trailrunning Aufsteigerin des Jahres" at the Austria Trail Awards and appeared in an interview for the Laufend Entdecken podcast.

Her early UTMB World Series results included victory in the women's mozart Light race at mozart 100 by UTMB in Salzburg, where she finished the 31.7 km event in 2:49:42 and placed second overall. She also won the women's Speed Trail race at Hochkönigman in 1:50:55.

Speer's Austrian results include wins at the Trail Classic race of the Innsbruck Alpine Trailrun Festival, the PIUT50 at the Paznaun Ischgl Ultratrail, the Gaisbergrace at the Salzburg Trailrunning Festival and the Red Bull 400 at the Bergisel ski jump in Innsbruck. At PIUT50, she covered the 50 km course with 3,150 metres of elevation gain in 5:56:08.

Kronen Zeitung covered Speer ahead of the Salzburg Trailrunning Festival, describing her as a previous winner returning to the event with a new multi-day challenge. German trail-running site Alles Laufbar also listed Speer among the notable athletes in the women's field at the Hochstaufen Run, part of the Golden Trail National Series.

Speer represented Austria at the World Mountain and Trail Running Championships in Canfranc, Spain, competing in the women's short trail race over 44.5 km.

At Mallorca by UTMB, Speer won the women's Els Tres Mils race, a 56 km event with 2,450 metres of elevation gain in the Serra de Tramuntana. She finished in 6:02:57. Her win drew coverage in Salzburger Nachrichten, which described the result as a breakthrough performance at a UTMB World Series event.

Speer won the women's HOKA mozart Marathon at mozart 100 by UTMB, a 44 km race with 1,600 metres of elevation gain. She finished in 3:38:17. Salzburger Nachrichten described the result as a home victory for the Salzburg athlete, while iRunFar also reported the win in its international weekly race roundup.

== Selected results ==
Year	Race	Location	Distance	Time	Overall place	Notes	Ref.
2023	mozart Light, mozart 100 by UTMB	Salzburg, Austria	31.7 km	2:49:42	2nd	Women's winner	
2023	Speed Trail, Hochkönigman	Maria Alm am Steinernen Meer, Austria	20.9 km	1:50:55	4th	Women's winner	
2025	Trail Classic, Innsbruck Alpine Trailrun Festival	Innsbruck, Austria	17 km	1:18:31	24th	Women's winner; Austrian Trail Classic championship	
2025	PIUT50, Paznaun Ischgl Ultratrail	Paznaun, Austria	50 km	5:56:08	3rd	Women's winner	
2025	Short Trail, World Mountain and Trail Running Championships	Canfranc, Spain	44.5 km	6:23:37	158th	39th female	
2025	Gaisbergrace, Salzburg Trailrunning Festival	Salzburg, Austria	9.1 km	1:13:43	—	Women's winner	
2025	Red Bull 400 Bergisel	Innsbruck, Austria	400 m uphill	—	—	Women's winner	
2025	Els Tres Mils, Mallorca by UTMB	Serra de Tramuntana, Spain	56 km	6:02:57	11th	Women's winner	
2026	HOKA mozart Marathon, mozart 100 by UTMB	Fuschl am See / Salzburg, Austria	44 km	3:38:17	—	Women's winner	
