= 2023 World Mountain and Trail Running Championships =

- Dates: June 6–10, 2023
- Host city: Innsbruck-Stubaital, Austria
- Level: Senior, Junior
- Type: Outdoor
- Events: 10 (men: 4; women: 4) (U20 boys: 1; U20 girls: 1)

The 2023 World Mountain and Trail Running Championships (abbreviated WMTRC 2023) was the second World Mountain and Trail Running Championships, combining the World Mountain Running Championships and IAU Trail World Championships. The event was organised by the World Mountain Running Association, International Trail Running Association and International Association of Ultrarunners sanctioned by World Athletics.

== Medal summary ==
=== Medal table ===
* Host nation (Austria)

Rank	Nation	Gold	Silver	Bronze	Total
1	France	6	2	3	11
2	Kenya	5	2	2	9
3	Great Britain	3	2	1	6
4	Uganda	2	3	0	5
5	Switzerland	1	2	3	6
6	United States	1	1	2	4
7	Austria	1	0	0	1
7	Norway	1	0	0	1
9	Italy	0	3	4	7
10	Germany	0	3	1	4
11	Spain	0	1	3	4
12	Sweden	0	1	0	1
13	Slovakia	0	0	1	1
Totals (13 entries)		20	20	20	60

=== Men's events ===
Results for men's events:

Event	Gold		Silver		Bronze	
Uphill mountain race	Patrick Kipngeno; Kenya	40:18	Levi Kiprotich; Uganda	41:51	Josphat Kiprotich; Kenya	42:04
Team uphill race	Kenya; Patrick Kipngeno; Josphat Kiprotich; Philemon Ombogo Kiriago	11pts	Uganda; Levi Kiprotich; Eliud Cherop; Dismas Yeko	21pts	Switzerland; Roberto De Lorenzi; Dominik Rolli; Jonas Soldini	45pts
Short trail	Stian Hovind Angermund; Norway	4:19:00	Thomas Roach; Great Britain	4:21:18	Luca Del Pero; Italy	4:22:04
Team short trail	United Kingdom; Thomas Roach; Jonathan Albon; Kristian Jones	13:18:52	Italy; Luca Del Pero; Francesco Puppi; Cristian Minoggio	13:26:32	France; Thibaut Baronian; Frederic Tranchand; Thomas Cardin	13:34:38
Long trail	Benjamin Roubiol; France	9:52:59	Andreas Reiterer; Italy	10:00:46	Peter Fraño; Slovakia	10:02:10
Team long trail	France; Benjamin Roubiol; Thibaut Garrivier; Baptiste Chassagne	30:43:09	United States; Drew Holmen; Zach Miller; Eric Lipuma	30:48:17	Italy; Andreas Reiterer; Davide Cheraz; Philipp Ausserhofer	31:29:55
Up and downhill mountain race	Leonard Chemutai; Uganda	56:14	Philemon Ombogo Kiriago; Kenya	56:22	Filimon Abraham; Germany	56:27
Team up and downhill race	Kenya; Philemon Ombogo Kiriago; Patrick Kipngeno; Josphat Kiprotich	15pts	Italy; Cesare Maestri; Xavier Chevrier; Alberto Vender	30pts	Spain; Alejandro García; Andreu Blanes; Ibai Larrea	43pts
6.5 km U20 mountain race	James Kirwa; Uganda	27:37	Hosea Chemutai; Uganda	27:43	Matthieu Bührer; Switzerland	27:52
Team 6.5 km U20 mountain race	Switzerland; Matthieu Bührer; Loïc Berger; Nino Freitag	18 pts	France; Anatole Berthou; Jules Mongellaz; Jules Barriod	28 pts	Spain; Jan Torrella; Marcos Villamuera; Marcos López Galera	32 pts

=== Women's events ===
Event	Gold		Silver		Bronze	
Uphill mountain race	Andrea Mayr; Austria	48:14	Philaries Jeruto Kisang; Kenya	48:51	Grayson Murphy; United States	49:22
Team uphill race	Kenya; Philaries Jeruto Kisang; Valentine Repkoech Rutto; Joyce Muthoni	17pts	Germany; Laura Hottenrott; Domenika Mayer; Hanna Gröber	33pts	United Kingdom; Scout Adkin; Sara Willhoit; Philippa Williams	51pts
Short trail	Clementine Geoffray; France	4:53:12	Judith Wyder; Switzerland	4:55:13	Theresa Leboeuf; Switzerland	5:09:29
Team short trail	France; Clementine Geoffray; Louise Serban-Phenoat; Lucille Germain	15:35:53	Switzerland; Judith Wyder; Theresa Leboeuf; Nina Zoller	15:44:14	United States; Jennifer Lichter; Emkay Sullivan; Kimber Mattox	15:54:29
Long trail	Marion Delespierre; France	11:22:31	Katharina Hartmuth; Germany	11:29:14	Manon Bohard Cailler; France	11:34:22
Team long trail	France; Marion Delespierre; Manon Bohard Cailler; Audrey Tanguy	34:58:23	Germany; Katharina Hartmuth; Rosanna Buchauer; Ida-Sophie Hegemann	35:32:01	Italy; Martina Valmassoi; Giuditta Turini; Marina Cugnetto	36:20:08
Up and downhill mountain race	Grayson Murphy; United States	1:04:29	Tove Alexandersson; Sweden	1:05:26	Joyce Muthoni; Kenya	1:06:40
Team up and downhill race	Kenya; Joyce Muthoni; Valentine Repkoech Rutto; Philaries Jeruto Kisang	14pts	United Kingdom; Alice Goodall; Scout Adkin; Philippa Williams	43pts	France; Cecile Jarousseau; Christel Dewalle; Elise Poncet	46pts
6.5 km U20 mountain race	Rebecca Flaherty; Great Britain	33:20	Ines Herault; Spain	33:27	Lucia Arnoldo; Italy	33:42
Team 6.5 km U20 mountain race	United Kingdom; Rebecca Flaherty; Amelie Lane; Lauren Russell	10 pts	France; Margot Dajoux; Alice Mugnier; Pauline Trocellier	27 pts	Spain; Ines Herault; Nadia Soto; Blanca Batlle	27 pts

== Results ==
=== 2023 World Mountain Running Championships Uphill Men's Standings ===
Distance 7.1km, difference in height 1,020 m.

Rank	Name	Nationality	Time	Notes
1st place, gold medalist(s)	Patrick Kipngeno	Kenya	40:18	
2nd place, silver medalist(s)	Levi Kiprotich	Uganda	41:51	
3rd place, bronze medalist(s)	Josphat Kiprotich	Kenya	42:04	
4	Eliud Cherop	Uganda	42:16	
5	Joseph Gray	United States	42:32	
6	Daniel Osanz	Spain	42:41	
7	Ombogo Kiriago Philemon	Kenya	42:54	
8	Joe Steward	United Kingdom	43:02	
9	Filimon Abraham	Germany	43:08	
10	Roberto Delorenzi	Switzerland	43:31	
11	Dominik Rolli	Switzerland	43:38	
12	Hillary Kimaiyo	Kenya	43:44	
13	Julius Ott	Germany	43:50	
14	Andrea Rostan	Italy	43:53	
15	Dismas Yeko	Uganda	43:54	
16	Emmanuel Meyssat	France	44:04	
17	Alexandre Ricard	Canada	44:08	
18	Quentin Meyleu	France	44:11	
19	Andrea Elia	Italy	44:18	
20	Theodore Klein	France	44:21	
21	Johan Bugge	Norway	44:25	
22	Jacob Adkin	United Kingdom	44:35	
23	Cesare Maestri	Italy	44:40	
24	Jonas Soldini	Switzerland	44:43	
25	Remi Leroux	Canada	44:47	
26	Alejandro García	Spain	45:00	
27	Zak Hanna	Ireland	45:03	
28	Klemen Španring	Slovenia	45:25	
29	Manuel Innerhofer	Austria	45:37	
30	Tiziano Moia	Italy	45:39	
31	Maximilian Zeus	Germany	45:43	
32	Christopher Richards	United Kingdom	45:50	
33	Matěj Zima	Czech Republic	46:11	
34	Martin Mattle	Austria	46:12	
35	Fabian Aebersold	Switzerland	46:22	
36	Timotej Bečan	Slovenia	46:30	
37	Manuel Santiago	Mexico	46:33	
38	Kane Reilly	South Africa	46:36	
39	Halfdan-Emil Færø	Norway	46:38	
40	Marcin Kubica	Poland	46:51	
41	Dan Curts	United States	47:06	
42	Marek Chrascina	Czech Republic	47:14	
43	Javier Adolfo Carriqueo	Argentina	47:23	
44	Eduardo Hernández	Spain	47:38	
45	Rares Imre Miklos	Romania	47:40	
46	Harald Kårbö	Norway	47:41	
47	Piotr Łobodziński	Poland	47:41	
48	Michal Šmahel	Czech Republic	47:46	
49	Augusto Geovanny Andrade Paguay	Ecuador	47:46	
50	Andrew Douglas	United Kingdom	47:57	
51	Pedro Jose Puentes Figueroa	Venezuela	48:02	
52	Liam Meirow	United States	48:03	
53	Marcelo Gonçalves	Portugal	48:05	
54	Toby Batchelor	New Zealand	48:05	
55	Dawid Malina	Poland	48:17	
56	Florian Zeisler	Austria	48:19	
57	Paulo Gomes	Portugal	48:19	
58	Jáchym Kovář	Czech Republic	48:23	
59	Justino Coronado	Mexico	48:26	
60	Erenjia Jia	China	48:26	
61	José Carvalho	Portugal	48:29	
62	Dominik Tabor	Poland	48:44	
63	Juan Ignacio Redolatti	Argentina	48:54	
64	Diego Ignacio Diaz	Chile	49:03	
65	Patrik Juhász	Hungary	49:17	
66	Martin Enzenberger	Austria	49:20	
67	Miran Cvet	Slovenia	49:34	
68	Oscar Paul Basantes Guañuna	Ecuador	49:34	
69	Peter-Daniel Herman	Romania	49:38	
70	Niam Macdonald	New Zealand	49:40	
71	Simon Spiteri	Malta	49:47	
72	Morgan Elliott	United States	49:48	
73	Rui Muga	Portugal	49:58	
74	Ákos Molnár	Hungary	50:04	
75	Eder Belmont	Mexico	50:13	
76	Cristóbal Stack	Chile	50:18	
77	Killian Mooney	Ireland	50:25	
78	Joel Dyrhovden	Norway	50:25	
79	Ruairi Long	Ireland	50:59	
80	Nathan Pearce	Australia	51:10	
81	Llewellyn Groeneveld	South Africa	51:11	
82	Sebastien Leclere	Belgium	51:13	
83	Max Napoleon Rohoden Jaramillo	Ecuador	51:18	
84	Aaron McGrady	Ireland	51:23	
85	Gabriel Muñoz	Chile	51:25	
86	Edgars Daugulis	Latvia	51:33	
87	Michael Sutton	New Zealand	51:34	
88	Tomas Reyes	Mexico	51:42	
89	Philipp Stuckhardt	Germany	51:51	
90	Zoltán Vigh	Hungary	52:14	
91	Nikola Špoljar	Croatia	52:22	
92	Andrejs Dmitrijevs	Latvia	52:26	
93	Kristaps Bērziņš	Latvia	52:26	
94	Kevin Dure Morales	Argentina	52:33	
95	Ivan Dračar	Croatia	52:45	
96	Georgi Zhekov	Bulgaria	52:52	
97	William Ricardo Aveiro	Paraguay	53:20	
98	Wai Ching Soh	Malaysia	53:26	
99	Marius Valentin Popa	Romania	53:32	
100	Alastair George	Australia	53:45	
101	Jeremy Hunt	Australia	53:51	
102	Jānis Mežiels	Latvia	54:08	
103	Frank Dariel Castro Perú	Cuba	55:18	
104	Ante Živković	Croatia	56:27	
105	Gareth Hadfield	Canada	56:40	
106	Marco Francioni	San Marino	57:09	
107	Thabang Madiba	South Africa	57:14	
108	Hsin-Kai Su	Chinese Taipei	57:20	
109	Karim Ramadan	Lebanon	58:29	
110	Mark Pace	Malta	59:29	
111	Cameron McNamara	Canada	1:00:11	
112	Wei-Ting Chen	Chinese Taipei	1:00:51	
113	Jake Fenech	Malta	1:01:06	
114	Yung-Jeng Tzeng	Chinese Taipei	1:01:29	
115	Stefano Benvenuti	San Marino	1:01:36	
116	Roberto Pazzaglia	San Marino	1:02:04	
117	Martín Schurch	Chile	1:02:37	
118	Elmir Askarov	Azerbaijan	1:15:02	
119	Farrell Hedrick	Cambodia	1:15:23	
120	Jun Kwan Chan	Malaysia	1:16:36	
121	Ammarith Ann	Cambodia	1:32:46	
	Ezequiel Becerra	Argentina	DNF	
	Miquel Corbera	Spain	DNS	
	Ventura Yanez Lozano	Equatorial Guinea	DNS	
	Ibai Larrea	Spain	DNS	
	Sebastian Batchelor	United Kingdom	DNS	
	Alex Baldaccini	Italy	DNS	
	Xavier Chevrier	Italy	DNS	
	Daniel Lustenberger	Switzerland	DNS	
	Edward Owens	United States	DNS	
	Jim Walmsley	United States	DNS	

=== 2023 World Mountain Running Championships Uphill Men's Team Standings ===
Rank	Country	Racers	Score
1st place, gold medalist(s)	Kenya	1 Patrick Kipngeno; 3 Josphat Kiprotich; 7 Ombogo Kiriago Philemon	11 pts
2nd place, silver medalist(s)	Uganda	2 Levi Kiprotich; 4 Eliud Cherop; 15 Dismas Yeko	21 pts
3rd place, bronze medalist(s)	Switzerland	10 Roberto Delorenzi; 11 Dominik Rolli; 24 Jonas Soldini	45 pts
4.	Germany	9 Filimon Abraham; 13 Julius Ott; 31 Maximilian Zeus	53 pts
5.	France	16 Emmanuel Meyssat; 18 Quentin Meyleu; 20 Theodore Klein	54 pts
6.	Italy	14 Andrea Rostan; 19 Andrea Elia; 23 Cesare Maestri	56 pts
7.	United Kingdom	8 Joe Steward; 22 Jacob Adkin; 32 Christopher Richards	62 pts
8.	Spain	6 Daniel Osanz; 26 Alejandro García; 44 Eduardo Hernández	76 pts
9.	United States	5 Joseph Gray; 41 Dan Curts; 52 Liam Meirow	98 pts
10.	Norway	21 Johan Bugge; 39 Halfdan-Emil Færø; 46 Harald Kårbö	106 pts
11.	Austria	29 Manuel Innerhofer; 34 Martin Mattle; 56 Florian Zeisler	119 pts
12.	Czech Republic	33 Matěj Zima; 42 Marek Chrascina; 48 Michal Šmahel	123 pts
13.	Slovenia	28 Klemen Španring; 36 Timotej Bečan; 67 Miran Cvet	131 pts
14.	Poland	40 Marcin Kubica; 47 Piotr Łobodziński; 55 Dawid Malina	142 pts
15.	Canada	17 Alexandre Ricard; 25 Remi Leroux; 105 Gareth Hadfield	147 pts
16.	Portugal	53 Marcelo Gonçalves; 57 Paulo Gomes; 61 José Carvalho	171 pts
17.	Mexico	37 Manuel Santiago; 59 Justino Coronado; 75 Eder Belmont	171 pts
18.	Ireland	27 Zak Hanna; 77 Killian Mooney; 79 Ruairi Long	183 pts
19.	Ecuador	49 Augusto Geovanny Andrade Paguay; 68 Oscar Paul Basantes Guañuna; 83 Max Napoleon Rohoden Jaramillo	200 pts
20.	Argentina	43 Javier Adolfo Carriqueo; 63 Juan Ignacio Redolatti; 94 Kevin Dure Morales	200 pts
21.	New Zealand	54 Toby Batchelor; 70 Niam Macdonald; 87 Michael Sutton	211 pts
22.	Romania	45 Rares Imre Miklos; 69 Peter-Daniel Herman; 99 Marius Valentin Popa	213 pts
23.	Chile	64 Diego Ignacio Diaz; 76 Cristóbal Stack; 85 Gabriel Muñoz	225 pts
24.	South Africa	38 Kane Reilly; 81 Llewellyn Groeneveld; 107 Thabang Madiba	226 pts
25.	Hungary	65 Patrik Juhász; 74 Ákos Molnár; 90 Zoltán Vigh	229 pts
26.	Latvia	86 Edgars Daugulis; 92 Andrejs Dmitrijevs; 93 Kristaps Bērziņš	271 pts
27.	Australia	80 Nathan Pearce; 100 Alastair George; 101 Jeremy Hunt	281 pts
28.	Croatia	91 Nikola Špoljar; 95 Ivan Dračar; 104 Ante Živković	290 pts
29.	Malta	71 Simon Spiteri; 110 Mark Pace; 113 Jake Fenech	294 pts
30.	Chinese Taipei	108 Hsin-Kai Su; 112 Wei-Ting Chen; 114 Yung-Jeng Tzeng	334 pts
31.	San Marino	106 Marco Francioni; 115 Stefano Benvenuti; 116 Roberto Pazzaglia	337 pts

=== 2023 World Mountain Running Championships Uphill Women's Standings ===
Distance 7.1km, difference in height 1,020 m.

Rank	Name	Nationality	Time	Notes
1st place, gold medalist(s)	Andrea Mayr	Austria	48:13	
2nd place, silver medalist(s)	Philaries Jeruto Kisang	Kenya	48:51	
3rd place, bronze medalist(s)	Grayson Murphy	United States	49:22	
4	Laura Hottenrott	Germany	49:56	
5	Valentine Jepkoech Rutto	Kenya	49:59	
6	Christel Dewalle	France	50:04	
7	Domenika Mayer	Germany	51:21	
8	Scout Adkin	United Kingdom	51:39	
9	Karoline Holsen Kyte	Norway	51:51	
10	Joyce Muthoni	Kenya	52:09	
11	Emma Pooley	Switzerland	52:11	
12	Annet Chemengich Chelangat	Uganda	52:23	
13	Allie McLaughlin	United States	52:27	
14	Giselle Slotboom	Netherlands	52:29	
15	Anne-Marie Comeau	Canada	52:29	
16	Elisa Sortini	Italy	52:43	
17	Tereza Hrochová	Czech Republic	52:52	
18	Francesca Ghelfi	Italy	52:52	
19	Valentina Belotti	Italy	52:58	
20	Sara Willhoit	United Kingdom	52:58	
21	Sarah McCormack	Ireland	53:12	
22	Hanna Gröber	Germany	53:14	
23	Phillipa Williams	United Kingdom	53:19	
24	Kate Avery	United Kingdom	53:39	
25	Silvia Schwaiger	Slovakia	53:43	
26	Onditz Iturbe	Spain	54:10	
27	Jade Belzberg	Canada	54:20	
28	Lara Hamilton	Australia	54:20	
29	Anna Celinska	Poland	54:23	
30	Melanie Maurer	Switzerland	54:48	
31	Barbora Macurová	Czech Republic	54:48	
32	Vivien Bonzi	Italy	54:53	
33	Adéla Vetchá	Czech Republic	55:08	
34	Silvia Lara	Spain	55:15	
35	Nora Markhus	Norway	55:21	
36	Katarína Pejpkova–Beresová	Slovakia	55:23	
37	Flavia Stutz	Switzerland	55:40	
38	Rachel Tomajczyk	United States	55:47	
39	Laura Hampel	Germany	55:50	
40	Blanca Maribel Llumiquinga	Ecuador	55:54	
41	Liliana Maria Dragomir	Romania	55:56	
42	Malen Osa	Spain	55:56	
43	Diana Landi Andrade	Ecuador	56:17	
44	Maria Magdalena Bosinceanu	Romania	56:30	
45	Hana Švestková Stružková	Czech Republic	56:42	
46	Valentina Venerucci	San Marino	56:48	
47	Ainhoa Sanz	Spain	56:53	
48	Chiara Milena Mainetti	Argentina	57:02	
49	Karin Freitag	Austria	57:10	
50	Sandrina Illes	Austria	57:13	
51	Céline Aebi	Switzerland	57:29	
52	Camila Cioffi	Argentina	57:29	
53	Katarína Lovrantová	Slovakia	57:37	
54	Kerri Labrecque	Canada	57:37	
55	Elena Adelina Panaet	Romania	58:09	
56	Mariel Salazar	Mexico	58:30	
57	Aine Gosling	Ireland	58:46	
58	Dominika Zupančič Valant	Slovenia	58:48	
59	Joana Soares	Portugal	58:50	
60	Bianca Tarboton	South Africa	58:56	
61	Ida Waldal	Norway	59:00	
62	Marie Dessart	Belgium	59:15	
63	Tea Faber	Croatia	59:23	
64	Anja Mikuž	Slovenia	59:30	
65	Varineja Drašler	Slovenia	59:30	
66	Maria Jilote	Mexico	59:56	
67	Jessica Ronan	Australia	59:58	
68	Maia Flint	New Zealand	1:00:42	
69	Agate Armane	Latvia	1:00:45	
70	Sarah Douglas	New Zealand	1:00:46	
71	Maegan Mackenzie	South Africa	1:00:53	
72	Kate Morrison	New Zealand	1:01:30	
73	Lisa Hegarty	Ireland	1:01:36	
74	Viviana Carolina Rios Cedillo	Ecuador	1:01:49	
75	Valeria Correa	Chile	1:01:50	
76	Sabrina Edwards	New Zealand	1:02:29	
77	Maria Sol Andreucetti	Argentina	1:03:22	
78	Carla Alejandra Pinos Santamaria	Ecuador	1:03:32	
79	Elena Stephenson	Australia	1:03:45	
80	Sasha Gollish	Canada	1:04:09	
81	Kinga Zólyomi	Hungary	1:04:26	
82	Judith Lopez	Mexico	1:04:35	
83	Rachel Borg	Malta	1:05:17	
84	Virginija Bernotaite	Lithuania	1:06:18	
85	Marisa Cortright	Croatia	1:06:33	
86	Sara Superina	Croatia	1:06:40	
87	Tamara Véliz	Chile	1:07:04	
88	Eszter Osi	Hungary	1:07:36	
89	Giselle Camilleri	Malta	1:08:10	
90	Wan-Fang Chang	Chinese Taipei	1:08:28	
91	Emma OSullivan	Australia	1:08:42	
92	Gundega Heidingere	Latvia	1:08:50	
93	Meng-Yun Tung	Chinese Taipei	1:11:29	
94	Alexandra Lawson	United States	1:11:58	
95	Lucija Kopic	Croatia	1:16:09	
96	Kriste Hincaite	Lithuania	1:17:34	
97	Wan-Yun Kao	Chinese Taipei	1:19:32	
	Susanna Saapunki	Finland	DNF	
	Edel Monaghan	Ireland	DNF	
	Monica Madalina Florea	Romania	DNF	
	Immaculate Chemutai	Uganda	DNF	
	Dominika Méro	Hungary	DNS	
	Risper Chebet	Uganda	DNS	
	Joy Cheptoyek	Uganda	DNS	
	Lijan van Niekerk	South Africa	DNS	
	Rosa Godoy	Argentina	DNS	
	Anna Plattner	Austria	DNS	
	Pavla Schorná Matyásová	Czech Republic	DNS	
	Ruth Jones	United Kingdom	DNS	
	Maddalena Somà	Italy	DNS	
	Lucija Krkoc	Slovenia	DNS	
	Judith Wyder	Switzerland	DNS	

=== 2023 World Mountain Running Championships Uphill Women's Team Standings ===
Rank	Country	Racers	Score
1st place, gold medalist(s)	Kenya	2 Philaries Jeruto Kisang; 5 Valentine Jepkoech Rutto; 10 Joyce Muthoni	17 pts
2nd place, silver medalist(s)	Germany	4 Laura Hottenrott; 7 Domenika Mayer; 22 Hanna Gröber	33 pts
3rd place, bronze medalist(s)	United Kingdom	8 Scout Adkin; 20 Sara Willhoit; 23 Phillipa Williams	51 pts
4.	Italy	16 Elisa Sortini; 18 Francesca Ghelfi; 19 Valentina Belotti	53 pts
5.	United States	3 Grayson Murphy; 13 Allie Mclaughlin; 38 Rachel Tomajczyk	54 pts
6.	Switzerland	11 Emma Pooley; 30 Melanie Maurer; 37 Flavia Stutz	78 pts
7.	Czech Republic	17 Tereza Hrochová; 31 Barbora Macurová; 33 Adéla Vetchá	81 pts
8.	Canada	15 Anne-Marie Comeau; 27 Jade Belzberg; 54 Kerri Labrecque	96 pts
9.	Austria	1 Andrea Mayr; 49 Karin Freitag; 50 Sandrina Illes	100 pts
10.	Spain	26 Onditz Iturbe; 34 Silvia Lara; 42 Malen Osa	102 pts
11.	Norway	9 Karoline Holsen Kyte; 35 Nora Markhus; 61 Ida Waldal	105 pts
12.	Slovakia	25 Silvia Schwaiger; 36 Katarína Pejpkova-Berešová; 53 Katarína Lovrantová	114 pts
13.	Romania	41 Liliana Maria Dragomir; 44 Maria Magdalena Bosinceanu; 55 Elena Adelina Panaet	140 pts
14.	Ireland	21 Sarah Mccormack; 57 Aine Gosling; 73 Lisa Hegarty	151 pts
15.	Ecuador	40 Blanca Maribel Llumiquinga Llumiquinga; 43 Diana Landi Andrade; 74 Viviana Carolina Rios Cedillo	157 pts
16.	Australia	28 Lara Hamilton; 67 Jessica Ronan; 79 Elena Stephenson	174 pts
17.	Argentina	48 Chiara Milena Mainetti; 52 Camila Cioffi; 77 Maria Sol Andreucetti	177 pts
18.	Slovenia	58 Dominika Zupančič Valant; 64 Anja Mikuž; 65 Varineja Drašler	187 pts
19.	Mexico	56 Mariel Salazar; 66 Maria Jilote; 82 Judith Lopez	204 pts
20.	New Zealand	68 Maia Flint; 70 Sarah Douglas; 72 Kate Morrison	210 pts
21.	Croatia	63 Tea Faber; 85 Marisa Cortright; 86 Sara Superina	234 pts
22.	Chinese Taipei	90 Wan-Fang Chang; 93 Meng-Yun Tung; 97 Wan-Yun Kao	280 pts

=== 2023 World Mountain Running Championships 7.5 km U20 Women’s Standings ===
Distance 7.5 km, total ascent of 375 m, total descent of 375 m.

Rank	Name	Nationality	Time
1st place, gold medalist(s)	Rebecca Flaherty	United Kingdom	33:20
2nd place, silver medalist(s)	Ines Herault	Spain	33:27
3rd place, bronze medalist(s)	Lucia Arnoldo	Italy	33:42
4	Amelie Lane	United Kingdom	34:22
5	Lauren Russell	United Kingdom	34:25
6	Nadia Soto	Spain	34:28
7	Margot Dajoux	France	34:52
8	Eve Whitaker	United Kingdom	35:00
9	Alice Mugnier	France	35:05
10	Ida Waldal	Norway	35:06
11	Pauline Trocellier	France	35:09
12	Anna Hofer	Italy	35:21
13	Aina Scherling	Switzerland	35:28
14	Klara Močnik	Slovenia	35:35
15	Lili Beck	France	36:01
16	Samantha Wood	United States	36:16
17	Emily Vucemillo	Italy	36:25
18	Lindsey Whitton	United States	36:45
19	Blanca Batlle	Spain	36:56
20	Laura Ordiales	Spain	37:02
21	Ceyda Melek Pinar	Turkey	37:03
22	Petra Havlová	Czech Republic	37:22
23	Rojda Goran	Turkey	37:22
24	Matilde Bonino	Italy	37:30
25	Monika Ogórek	Poland	37:34
26	Gabriela Camacho	Mexico	37:37
27	Sofia Chételat	Switzerland	37:54
28	Milaina Almonte	United States	38:04
29	Vanda Lövei	Hungary	38:16
30	Zofia Teofilewska	Poland	38:22
31	Sofia Peña	Mexico	38:23
32	Natália Iker	Hungary	38:35
33	Zeynep Ertaş	Turkey	38:48
34	Sara Bilban	Slovenia	38:51
35	Ana Novak	Slovenia	38:51
36	Katie Graham	Ireland	39:00
37	Eunice Lescano	Argentina	39:25
38	Eimear Mccarroll	Ireland	40:13
39	Juliana Itati Romero	Argentina	40:22
40	Fabiola Fortschegger	Austria	41:28
41	Hanna Galler	Austria	42:06
42	Laura Galsi	Hungary	42:16
43	Selwyn Russell	Australia	42:19
44	Kate Connolly	Ireland	43:49
45	Tania Geovanna Vallejo Triana	Ecuador	44:56
46	Camila De La Colina	Argentina	45:45
47	Jessica Blaney	Ireland	48:06
48	Lily Jin	United States	53:53
	Antonella Cristina Arias Zambrano	Ecuador	DNF
	Klara Velepec	Slovenia	DNF
	Nina Villiger	Switzerland	DNF
	Maria Belen Burgos Lozada	Bolivia	DNS
	Georgia Bell	United Kingdom	DNS
	Matilde Bagnus	Italy	DNS
	Elisa Peverelli	Italy	DNS
	Priscilla Chepkwemoi	Uganda	DNS
	Nancy Chepkwurui	Uganda	DNS

=== 2023 World Mountain Running Championships 7.5 km U20 Women's Team Standings ===
Distance 7.5 km, total ascent of 375 m, total descent of 375 m.

Rank	Country	Racers	Score
1st place, gold medalist(s)	United Kingdom	1 Rebecca Flaherty; 4 Amelie Lane; 5 Lauren Russell	10 pts
2nd place, silver medalist(s)	France	7 Margot Dajoux; 9 Alice Mugnier; 11 Pauline Trocellier	27 pts
3rd place, bronze medalist(s)	Spain	2 Ines Herault; 6 Nadia Soto; 19 Blanca Batlle	27 pts
4.	Italy	3 Lucia Arnoldo; 12 Anna Hofer; 17 Emily Vucemillo	32 pts
5.	United States	16 Samantha Wood; 18 Lindsey Whitton; 28 Milaina Almonte	62 pts
6.	Turkey	21 Ceyda Melek Pinar; 23 Rojda Goran; 33 Zeynep Ertaş	77 pts
7.	Slovenia	14 Klara Močnik; 34 Sara Bilban; 35 Ana Novak	83 pts
8.	Hungary	29 Vanda Lövei; 32 Natália Iker; 42 Laura Galsi	103 pts
9.	Ireland	36 Katie Graham; 38 Eimear Mccarroll; 44 Kate Connolly	118 pts
10.	Argentina	37 Eunice Lescano; 39 Juliana Itati Romero; 46 Camila De La Colina	122 pts

=== 2023 World Mountain Running Championships 7.5 km U20 men’s Standings ===
Distance 7.5 km, total ascent of 375 m, total descent of 375 m.

Rank	Name	Nationality	Time
1st place, gold medalist(s)	James Kirwa	Uganda	27:37
2nd place, silver medalist(s)	Hosea Chemutai	Uganda	27:43
3rd place, bronze medalist(s)	Matthieu Bührer	Switzerland	27:52
4	Lukas Ehrle	Germany	28:28
5	Jan Torrella	Spain	28:38
6	Anatole Berthou	France	28:43
7	Loic Berger	Switzerland	28:56
8	Nino Freitag	Switzerland	29:10
9	Jules Mongellaz	France	29:16
10	Mervan Haykir	Turkey	29:25
11	Marcos Villamuera	Spain	29:32
12	Matěj Placatka	Czech Republic	29:36
13	Jules Barriod	France	29:48
14	Mauro Dallapiccola	Italy	29:58
15	Michael Maiorano	United States	30:07
16	Marcos López Galera	Spain	30:10
17	Fabián Venero	Spain	30:16
18	Miguel Angel Lopez	Mexico	30:19
19	Adam Krajč	Slovakia	30:21
20	Nicola Morosini	Italy	30:23
21	Chane Souard	France	30:23
22	Kenan Pala	United States	30:34
23	William Longden	United Kingdom	30:46
24	Jesus Quiroz	Mexico	30:55
25	Maximilian Meusburger	Austria	30:55
26	Ümran Bulut	Turkey	30:57
27	Tom Crudgington	Ireland	30:58
28	Ewan Busfield	United Kingdom	31:01
29	Caleb Richardson	United States	31:16
30	Francesco Bongio	Italy	31:25
31	Alexander Poulston	United Kingdom	31:28
32	Bertold Kalász	Hungary	31:35
33	Maj Pritržnik	Slovenia	31:44
34	Francesco Mazza	Italy	31:51
35	Maciej Lachowski	Poland	31:59
36	Milán Zahorán	Hungary	32:04
37	Julio Alejandro Espinoza	Chile	32:07
38	Emilio Paul Leon Perez	Ecuador	32:09
39	Mark Lopez	Mexico	32:11
40	Niklas Scherb	Austria	32:21
41	Wes Shipsey	United States	32:28
42	Colum O'neil	Ireland	32:46
43	Thomas Perry	United Kingdom	32:50
44	Zack Newsham	Australia	32:54
45	Diego Rebolledo	Argentina	33:00
46	Hector Perez	Mexico	33:11
47	Fabian Hennerbichler	Austria	33:14
48	Arvid Lösel	Germany	33:16
49	Mark Kocar	Slovenia	33:18
50	Israel Chimbo Pasato	Ecuador	33:34
51	Abdülmecit Açan	Turkey	33:49
52	Dumitru-Florin Gut	Romania	33:53
53	Ignacio Poza	Argentina	33:58
54	Ciprian Costin	Romania	34:20
55	Jaka Marinko	Slovenia	34:31
56	Martín Céspedes	Chile	34:31
57	Agustín García	Chile	34:36
58	Lawson Duff	Australia	34:38
59	Benjamin Rickerby	New Zealand	34:43
60	Andrei Dascal	Romania	35:17
61	Roberth Paul Guachamin Raimundo	Ecuador	35:27
62	Matija Maglica	Slovenia	35:44
63	Lucas Maldonado	Chile	35:46
64	Anselme Poher	Canada	36:08
65	Ryan Mccarthy	Ireland	36:40
66	Ariel Sebastian Vallejo Buenaño	Ecuador	37:12
67	Albert Constantin Munteanu	Romania	37:37
68	Ethan Mcmullan	Ireland	38:05
69	Lautaro Daniel Tesio	Argentina	39:29
70	Levente Pocsai	Hungary	39:29
DNS	Jesus Cuevas Veramendi	Bolivia	DNS
DNS	Ignacio Alejandro Sejas Aguilera	Bolivia	DNS
DNS	Julian Salas Acuña	Argentina	DNS
DNS	Nicoló Lora Moretto	Italy	DNS
DNS	Samuel Zanaboni	Italy	DNS

=== 2023 World Mountain Running Championships 7.5 km U20 Men's Team Standings ===
Rank	Country	Racers	Score
1st place, gold medalist(s)	Switzerland	3 Matthieu Bührer; 7 Loïc Berger; 8 Nino Freitag	18 pts
2nd place, silver medalist(s)	France	6 Anatole Berthou; 9 Jules Mongellaz; 13 Jules Barriod	28 pts
3rd place, bronze medalist(s)	Spain	5 Jan Torrella; 11 Marcos Villamuera; 16 Marcos López Galera	32 pts
4.	Italy	4 Mauro Dallapiccola; 20 Nicola Morosini; 30 Francesco Bongio	64 pts
5.	United States	15 Michael Maiorano; 22 Kenan Pala; 29 Caleb Richardson	66 pts
6.	Mexico	18 Miguel Angel Lopez; 24 Jesus Quiroz; 39 Mark Lopez	81 pts
7.	United Kingdom	23 William Longden; 28 Ewan Busfield; 31 Alexander Poulston	82 pts
8.	Turkey	10 Mervan Haykir; 26 Ümran Bulut; 51 Abdülmecit Açan	87 pts
9.	Austria	25 Maximilian Meusburger; 40 Niklas Scherb; 47 Fabian Hennerbichler	112 pts
10.	Ireland	27 Tom Crudgington; 42 Colum O'neil; 65 Ryan Mccarthy	134 pts
11.	Slovakia	33 Maj Pritržnik; 49 Mark Kocar; 55 Jaka Marinko	137 pts
12.	Hungary	32 Bertold Kalász; 36 Milán Zahorán; 70 Levente Pocsai	138 pts
13.	Ecuador	38 Emilio Paul Leon Perez; 50 Israel Chimbo Pasato; 61 Roberth Paul Guachamin Raimundo	149 pts
14.	Chile	37 Julio Alejandro Espinoza; 56 Martín Céspedes; 57 Agustín García	150 pts
15.	Romania	52 Dumitru-Florin Gut; 54 Ciprian Costin; 60 Andrei Dascal	166 pts
16.	Argentina	45 Diego Rebolledo; 53 Ignacio Poza; 69 Lautaro Daniel Tesio	167 pts

=== 2023 World Mountain Running Championships Short trail Men’s Standings ===
Distance 45.2 km, total ascent of 3,130 m, total descent of 2,720 m.

Individual

Rank	Runner	Country	Time
1st place, gold medalist(s)	Stian Hovind Angermund	Norway	4:19:00
2nd place, silver medalist(s)	Thomas Roach	United Kingdom	4:21:18
3rd place, bronze medalist(s)	Luca Del Pero	Italy	4:22:04
4	Thibaut Baronian	France	4:25:41
5	Jonathan Albon	United Kingdom	4:26:57
6	Francesco Puppi	Italy	4:28:16
7	Andrzej Witek	Poland	4:29:21
8	Kristian Jones	United Kingdom	4:30:37
9	Frédéric Tranchand	France	4:31:07
10	Benedikt Hoffmann	Germany	4:32:28
11	Stephan Wenk	Switzerland	4:34:08
12	Ruy Ueda	Japan	4:34:45
13	Petter Engdahl	Sweden	4:35:21
14	Garrett Corcoran	United States	4:35:34
15	Cristian Minoggio	Italy	4:36:12
16	Thomas Cardin	France	4:37:50
17	Eliseo Joaquin Narvaez	Argentina	4:39:05
18	Leonard Albert Mitrica	Romania	4:41:24
19	Max King	United States	4:41:50
20	Anders Johnny Kjærevik	Norway	4:42:03
21	Loïc Robert	France	4:42:18
22	Daniel Pattis	Italy	4:42:47
23	Rafał Matuszczak	Poland	4:43:38
24	Michał Rajca	Poland	4:44:26
25	Zaid Ait Malek	Spain	4:44:40
26	Mario Olmedo	Spain	4:44:44
27	Marc Dürr	Germany	4:44:47
28	Juho Ylinen	Finland	4:45:33
29	Dominik Matt	Austria	4:46:08
30	Jackson Brill	United States	4:46:26
31	Krzysztof Bodurka	Poland	4:46:58
32	Hans-Peter Innerhofer	Austria	4:49:28
33	Tomas Hudec	Czech Republic	4:50:08
34	Tobias Baggenstos	Switzerland	4:50:36
35	Bogdan Damian	Romania	4:52:00
36	Jonatan Arobes	Spain	4:52:04
37	Craig Hunt	United States	4:53:02
38	Bruno Silva	Portugal	4:53:10
39	Tuomas Kari	Finland	4:53:28
40	Thomas Wanninger	Germany	4:54:08
41	Moises Martínez	Mexico	4:54:28
42	Julien Rancon	France	4:54:37
43	Oscar Claesson	Sweden	4:54:37
44	Marcel Höche	Germany	4:54:45
45	Andreas Rieder	Austria	4:55:09
46	Mårten Boström	Finland	4:55:31
47	Chris Balestrini	Canada	4:56:13
48	Jonas Hesthaug	Norway	4:56:33
49	François Leboeuf	Switzerland	4:57:37
50	Andrea Rota	Italy	4:59:27
51	Dimas Pereira	Spain	5:01:38
52	Ruedi Becker	Switzerland	5:01:51
53	Linus Hultegård	Sweden	5:02:55
54	Marcus Ribi	Canada	5:03:12
55	Dário Moitoso	Portugal	5:04:41
56	Valentin Toma	Romania	5:04:54
57	Rogério Silvestrim	Brazil	5:05:42
58	Jon Aziz	United States	5:05:42
59	Vladislav Ixel	Australia	5:06:26
60	Tiago Vieira	Portugal	5:07:32
61	Juan Pablo Llanos	Chile	5:10:01
62	Luis Valle	Chile	5:11:30
63	Athanasios Pagounadis	Greece	5:11:46
64	Diego Ramón Simon	Argentina	5:12:24
65	Samuël Poher	Canada	5:13:49
66	Ezequiel Alexis Pauluzak	Argentina	5:14:14
67	Marko Tratnik	Slovenia	5:14:25
68	Adam Cunningham	Ireland	5:14:34
69	Paulo Mesquita	Portugal	5:14:51
70	Nicolás Palacios	Chile	5:15:54
71	Huub Van Noorden	Netherlands	5:16:14
72	Kane Reilly	South Africa	5:17:19
73	Thorsteinn Roy Jóhannsson	Iceland	5:18:26
74	Christian Grøn Nørfelt	Denmark	5:18:34
75	Matthew Crehan	Australia	5:18:58
76	Johan Van Heerden	South Africa	5:19:29
77	Antti Parjanne	Finland	5:19:40
78	Alexander Marcelo Olivo Merino	Ecuador	5:20:13
79	Gastón Nicolás Cambareri	Argentina	5:20:29
80	Miroslav Hraško	Slovakia	5:20:43
81	Christian Leu	Switzerland	5:21:15
82	António Almeida	Portugal	5:22:08
83	Nayib Daabal Chmeit	Venezuela	5:22:22
84	Frederik Hagen Ernst	Denmark	5:23:00
85	Máté Dávid Vásárhelyi	Hungary	5:24:06
86	Barry Mcevoy	Ireland	5:25:30
87	Martin Anthamatten	Switzerland	5:26:47
88	Fraser Darcy	Australia	5:27:06
89	Hugo César Rodriguez	Argentina	5:29:28
90	Jacques Du Plessis	South Africa	5:29:43
91	Jörundur Frímann Jónasson	Iceland	5:30:41
92	Enda Cloake	Ireland	5:32:17
93	Roberto Baião	Portugal	5:32:58
94	Halldór Hermann Jónsson	Iceland	5:33:05
95	Alexandru Marinel Blejdea	Romania	5:34:30
96	Pavol Orolín	Slovakia	5:34:40
97	Gerhard Kaufmann	Austria	5:35:25
98	Andrej Hladnik	Croatia	5:35:59
99	Randolf Gonzales	Philippines	5:39:54
100	Nejc Blatnik	Slovenia	5:40:01
101	Josip Meštrić	Croatia	5:40:51
102	Jan Margarit	Spain	5:41:15
103	Alex Xavier Lozano Espinosa	Ecuador	5:42:26
104	Kārlis Eiduks	Latvia	5:43:13
105	Darius Bajarunas	Lithuania	5:43:30
106	Aleš Žontar	Slovenia	5:43:46
107	Nick Elson	Canada	5:44:56
108	Samuel David Davila	Venezuela	5:45:07
109	Matías Barros	Chile	5:45:28
110	Dwight Grieve	New Zealand	5:46:48
111	Nikola Špoljar	Croatia	5:47:37
112	Ryan Farrugia	Malta	5:47:57
113	Wilsen Singgin	Malaysia	5:52:35
114	Domantas Kavaliauskas	Lithuania	5:52:42
115	Godwin Mirar	Philippines	5:53:11
116	Anders Poul	Denmark	5:54:22
117	Suyong Kim	South Korea	5:54:58
118	David Longo	Australia	5:55:55
119	Ievgen Dzhadan	Ukraine	5:56:36
120	Máté Dalos	Hungary	5:57:28
121	Josip Toljan	Croatia	6:00:53
122	Emmanouil Pourikas	Greece	6:02:27
123	Karl Midlane	Zambia	6:04:06
124	Koji Morimoto	Japan	6:05:14
125	Jānis Kūms	Latvia	6:06:00
126	Matej Schieber	Slovakia	6:07:40
127	Juha Sorvisto	Finland	6:08:24
128	Justinas Vaizmuzys	Lithuania	6:10:30
129	Cristian Ariel Aranda	Paraguay	6:12:53
130	Jayson Zonio	Philippines	6:13:19
131	Rodrigo Andres Pozo Rosas	Ecuador	6:14:33
132	Joshua Potvin	Canada	6:14:43
133	Dimitri Thiounn	Cambodia	6:17:42
134	Doyun Kim	South Korea	6:28:54
135	Eldin Hodzic	Croatia	6:30:35
136	Marius Dijokas	Lithuania	6:32:07
137	Raivis Reinfelds	Latvia	6:32:10
138	Vaidas Ramanauskas	Lithuania	6:33:20
139	Sampathkumar Subramanian	India	6:35:49
140	Sannat Sachdev	India	6:36:49
141	Safrey Sumping	Malaysia	6:40:06
142	Bruno Schumi	Austria	6:42:20
143	Sergejs Ļeta	Latvia	6:45:08
144	Nandino Malešević	Bosnia and Herzegovina	6:45:20
145	Hyung Min Hwang	South Korea	6:46:03
146	Lorenzo Righi	San Marino	6:50:33
147	Ade Putra Katume	Indonesia	6:50:46
148	Francisco Moreira	Chile	7:03:54
149	Mohamad Affindi Bin Nudin	Malaysia	7:05:11
150	Eddy Khaou	Cambodia	7:05:18
151	Attila Pelsőczy	Hungary	7:08:23
152	Yu-Jian Jiang	Chinese Taipei	7:12:57
153	Kyuhwan Lee	South Korea	7:22:30
	Elmir Askarov	Azerbaijan	DNF
	Jean Jacques Mok	Cambodia	DNF
	Danielius Stasiulis	Lithuania	DNF
	Oliver Horst Kroll	Paraguay	DNF
	Shih-Jin Chien	Chinese Taipei	DNF
	Chih-Min Chuang	Chinese Taipei	DNF
	Kostyantyn Zhelezov	Ukraine	DNF
	Sebastian Falkensteiner	Austria	DNF
	Maximilien Drion Du Chapois	Belgium	DNF
	Jean Luc Puong	Cambodia	DNF
	Jessie Mcauley	Canada	DNF
	Max Boderskov	Denmark	DNF
	Anders Aagaard Hansen	Denmark	DNF
	Otto Saikkonen	Finland	DNF
	Alexander Chepelin	United Kingdom	DNF
	Ranto Ranto	Indonesia	DNF
	Tria Saputra	Indonesia	DNF
	Arnar Pétursson	Iceland	DNF
	Sebastian Krogvig	Norway	DNF
	Salim Baghdali	Algeria	DNS
	Mustapha Moumene	Algeria	DNS
	Mathieu Leng	Cambodia	DNS
	Yousheng Guan	China	DNS
	Tao Luo	China	DNS
	Juwei Zi	China	DNS
	Arnaud Bonin	France	DNS
	Daniel Connolly	United Kingdom	DNS
	Som Bahadur Thami	India	DNS
	Gianluca Ghiano	Italy	DNS
	Davide Magnini	Italy	DNS
	Fabio Ruga	Italy	DNS
	Geoffrey Gikuni	Kenya	DNS
	Ruud Kappert	Netherlands	DNS
	Seth Ruhling	United States	DNS

=== 2023 World Mountain Running Championships Short trail Men’s Team Standings ===
Rank	Team	Athletes	Total time
1st place, gold medalist(s)	United Kingdom	4:21:18 Thomas Roach; 4:26:57 Jonathan Albon; 4:30:37 Kristian Jones	13:18:52
2nd place, silver medalist(s)	Italy	4:22:04 Luca Del Pero; 4:28:16 Francesco Puppi; 4:36:12 Cristian Minoggio	13:26:32
3rd place, bronze medalist(s)	France	4:25:41 Thibaut Baronian; 4:31:07 Frédéric Tranchand; 4:37:50 Thomas Cardin	13:34:38
4	Poland	4:29:21 Andrzej Witek; 4:43:38 Rafał Matuszczak; 4:44:26 Michał Rajca	13:57:25
5	Norway	4:19:00 Stian Hovind Angermund; 4:42:03 Anders Johnny Kjærevik; 4:56:33 Jonas Hesthaug	13:57:36
6	United States	4:35:34 Garrett Corcoran; 4:41:50 Max King; 4:46:26 Jackson Brill	14:03:50
7	Germany	4:32:28 Benedikt Hoffmann; 4:44:47 Marc Dürr; 4:54:08 Thomas Wanninger	14:11:23
8	Spain	4:44:40 Zaid Ait Malek; 4:44:44 Mario Olmedo; 4:52:04 Jonatan Arobes	14:21:28
9	Switzerland	4:34:08 Stephan Wenk; 4:50:36 Tobias Baggenstos; 4:57:37 François Leboeuf	14:22:21
10	Austria	4:46:08 Dominik Matt; 4:49:28 Hans-Peter Innerhofer; 4:55:09 Andreas Rieder	14:30:45
11	Sweden	4:35:21 Petter Engdahl; 4:54:37 Oscar Claesson; 5:02:55 Linus Hultegård	14:32:53
12	Finland	4:45:33 Juho Ylinen; 4:53:28 Tuomas Kari; 4:55:31 Mårten Boström	14:34:32
13	Romania	4:41:24 Leonard Albert Mitrica; 4:52:00 Bogdan Damian; 5:04:54 Valentin Toma	14:38:18
14	Portugal	4:53:10 Bruno Silva; 5:04:41 Dário Moitoso; 5:07:32 Tiago Vieira	15:05:23
15	Argentina	4:39:05 Eliseo Joaquin Narvaez; 5:12:24 Diego Ramón Simon; 5:14:14 Ezequiel Alexis Pauluzak	15:05:43
16	Canada	4:56:13 Chris Balestrini; 5:03:12 Marcus Ribi; 5:13:49 Samuël Poher	15:13:14
17	Chile	5:10:01 Juan Pablo Llanos; 5:11:30 Luis Valle; 5:15:54 Nicolás Palacios	15:37:25
18	Australia	5:06:26 Vladislav Ixel; 5:18:58 Matthew Crehan; 5:27:06 Fraser Darcy	15:52:30
19	South Africa	5:17:19 Kane Reilly; 5:19:29 Johan Van Heerden; 5:29:43 Jacques Du Plessis	16:06:31
20	Ireland	5:14:34 Adam Cunningham; 5:25:30 Barry McEvoy; 5:32:17 Enda Cloake	16:12:21
21	Iceland	5:18:26 Thorsteinn Roy Jóhannsson; 5:30:41 Jörundur Frímann Jónasson; 5:33:05 Halldór Hermann Jónsson	16:22:12
22	Denmark	5:18:34 Christian Grøn Nørfelt; 5:23:00 Frederik Hagen Ernst; 5:54:22 Anders Poul	16:35:56
23	Slovenia	5:14:25 Marko Tratnik; 5:40:01 Nejc Blatnik; 5:43:46 Aleš Žontar	16:38:12
24	Slovakia	5:20:43 Miroslav Hraško; 5:34:40 Pavol Orolín; 6:07:40 Matej Schieber	17:03:03
25	Croatia	5:35:59 Andrej Hladnik; 5:40:51 Josip Meštrić; 5:47:37 Nikola Špoljar	17:04:27
26	Ecuador	5:20:13 Alexander Marcelo Olivo Merino; 5:42:26 Alex Xavier Lozano Espinosa; 6:14:33 Rodrigo Andres Pozo Rosas	17:17:12
27	Philippines	5:39:54 Randolf Gonzales; 5:53:11 Godwin Mirar; 6:13:19 Jayson Zonio	17:46:24
28	Lithuania	5:43:30 Darius Bajarunas; 5:52:42 Domantas Kavaliauskas; 6:10:30 Justinas Vaizmuzys	17:46:42
29	Latvia	5:43:13 Kārlis Eiduks; 6:06:00 Jānis Kūms; 6:32:10 Raivis Reinfelds	18:21:23
30	Hungary	5:24:06 Máté Dávid Vásárhelyi; 5:57:28 Máté Dalos; 7:08:23 Attila Pelsőczy	18:29:57
31	South Korea	5:54:58 Suyong Kim; 6:28:54 Doyun Kim; 6:46:03 Hyung Min Hwang	19:09:55
32	Malaysia	5:52:35 Wilsen Singgin; 6:40:06 Safrey Sumping; 7:05:11 Mohamad Affindi Bin Nudin	19:37:52

=== 2023 World Mountain Running Championships Short trail Women’s Standings ===
Distance 45.2 km, total ascent of 3,130 m, total descent of 2,720 m.

Individual

Rank	Runner	Country	Time
1st place, gold medalist(s)	Clementine Geofffray	France	4:53:12
2nd place, silver medalist(s)	Judith Wyder	Switzerland	4:55:13
3rd place, bronze medalist(s)	Theresa Leboeuf	Switzerland	5:09:29
4	Jennifer Lichter	United States	5:11:55
5	Emilia Brangefält	Sweden	5:15:11
6	Daniela Oemus	Germany	5:16:34
7	Oihana Kortazar	Spain	5:18:45
8	Emelie Forsberg	Sweden	5:18:45
9	Emkay Sullivan	United States	5:19:43
10	Louise Serban-Penhoat	France	5:20:21
11	Cecilia Basso	Italy	5:20:55
12	Caitlin Fielder	New Zealand	5:21:10
13	Sylvia Nordskar	Norway	5:21:25
14	Julia Font	Spain	5:21:43
15	Lucille Germain	France	5:22:20
16	Kimber Mattox	United States	5:22:51
17	Eleanor Davis	United Kingdom	5:23:30
18	Fabiola Conti	Italy	5:27:14
19	Alice Gaggi	Italy	5:27:16
20	Karina Carsolio	Mexico	5:28:48
21	Klaire Rhodes	United States	5:29:49
22	Anja Kobs	Germany	5:31:28
23	Johanna Gelfgren	Sweden	5:32:51
24	Ikram Rharsalla	Spain	5:33:06
25	Martina Cumerlato	Italy	5:36:42
26	Kalie McCrystal	Canada	5:36:45
27	Nuria Gil	Spain	5:37:05
28	Marie Goncalves	France	5:37:11
29	Lena Laukner	Germany	5:37:12
30	Marie Perrier	Mauritius	5:37:35
31	Noemie Vachon	France	5:37:43
32	Johanna Hiemer	Austria	5:38:21
33	Nina Zoller	Switzerland	5:39:32
34	Martina Chialvo	Italy	5:39:56
35	Andrea Kolbeinsdóttir	Iceland	5:42:14
36	Ida Amelie Eid Robsahm	Norway	5:42:22
37	Landie Greyling	South Africa	5:43:36
38	Charlotte Moerman	Belgium	5:43:41
39	Petra Tratnik	Slovenia	5:43:48
40	Sharon Taylor	United Kingdom	5:44:22
41	Kellie Angel	Australia	5:47:23
42	Emma Pooley	Switzerland	5:48:17
43	Natalia Gonzalez	Spain	5:48:34
44	Johanna Åström	Sweden	5:50:35
45	Ainara Urrutia	Spain	5:51:05
46	Inês João	Portugal	5:52:13
47	Ariane Wilhem	Switzerland	5:54:03
48	Michaela Pilat	Austria	5:54:28
49	Emilie Mann	Canada	5:56:10
50	Katie Morgan	New Zealand	5:57:34
51	Andreea Alina Piscu	Romania	5:59:26
52	Dioni Gorla	Germany	5:59:37
53	Cristina Arreiol	Portugal	6:00:40
54	Silvia Ortega	Mexico	6:01:08
55	Beatriz Alves	Portugal	6:01:20
56	Sofiia Porokhnavets	Ukraine	6:04:49
57	Susana Echeverría	Portugal	6:06:57
58	Oana Mihalcea	Romania	6:07:56
59	Shannon Penway	Canada	6:09:21
60	Isabell Bichler	Austria	6:10:39
61	Ivana Líšková	Slovakia	6:10:40
62	Suzuha Kusuda	Japan	6:11:30
63	Sigþóra Brynja Kristjánsdóttir	Iceland	6:12:19
64	Laura O'Driscoll	Ireland	6:13:14
65	Konstantina Boskopoulou	Greece	6:17:04
66	Maria Ines Chrestia	Argentina	6:17:42
67	Anna Pálmadóttir	Iceland	6:17:44
68	Catherine Taylor	United Kingdom	6:20:22
69	Patricia McKibbin	Australia	6:20:36
70	Florencia Soledad Iuorno	Argentina	6:22:50
71	Íris Anna Skúladóttir	Iceland	6:23:01
72	Chiara Giovando	Italy	6:23:30
73	Vanda Jenejová	Slovakia	6:24:25
74	Shelly Schenk	Switzerland	6:24:47
75	Jessica Campbell	New Zealand	6:26:07
76	Tamara Isabel Lopez	Argentina	6:27:24
77	Olga Nataly Torres Guzman	Ecuador	6:27:52
78	Mirjana Šimek Bilić	Croatia	6:28:30
79	Raluca Adriana Burtea	Romania	6:28:39
80	Leticia Da Silva Saltori	Brazil	6:32:22
81	Andrea Vanessa Eras Quirola	Ecuador	6:36:00
82	Jelena Malyseva	Lithuania	6:36:42
83	Vana Čargonja	Croatia	6:38:55
84	Melodie Gilbert	Canada	6:40:26
85	Neasa Coll	Canada	6:43:32
86	Dominga Villarino	Chile	6:43:53
87	Katherine Cañete	Chile	6:44:00
88	Patricia Cobi	Chile	6:46:11
89	Stine Katrine Baekgaard Olsen	Denmark	6:50:26
90	Erzsébet Prokopp	Hungary	6:51:41
91	Ana Oliveira	Portugal	6:53:49
92	Elizabeth Wheeler	Ireland	6:54:27
93	Gitana Akmanaviciutė	Lithuania	6:55:50
94	Simone Haastrup	Denmark	6:56:45
95	Amalie Wærum Hauge Bengtsson	Denmark	6:56:56
96	Valentyna Horban	Ukraine	7:00:48
97	Paula Havu	Finland	7:00:52
98	Petra Gergely	Hungary	7:01:35
99	Amelia Horne	New Zealand	7:02:40
100	Laura Moratorio	Uruguay	7:03:20
101	Ivita Šale	Latvia	7:05:54
102	Maria de Los Angeles Pereyra	Argentina	7:07:31
103	Irena Smojver	Croatia	7:07:33
104	Anja Neumann	Austria	7:08:09
105	Alejandra Valeria Maldonado Cachumba	Ecuador	7:08:23
106	Christabel Martes	Philippines	7:09:45
107	Norma Elizabeth Huera Aldas	Ecuador	7:12:59
108	Sunyeong Kim	South Korea	7:14:11
109	Blanca Marina Guaman Ortuño	Ecuador	7:14:11
110	Jan Corcoran	Ireland	7:14:22
111	Verónica Bravo	Chile	7:16:27
112	Veronika Páleniková	Slovakia	7:16:36
113	Helene Draborg	Denmark	7:18:00
114	Fatima Maria Villar	Paraguay	7:27:14
	Maria Paula Galindez	Argentina	DNF
	Madison Reynolds	Australia	DNF
	Dannielle Van Der Heul	Australia	DNF
	Naida Avdić	Bosnia and Herzegovina	DNF
	Helena Gleđa	Croatia	DNF
	Ines Jozić	Croatia	DNF
	Erika Lehtola	Finland	DNF
	Vivien Csiszár	Hungary	DNF
	Brigitta Poór	Hungary	DNF
	Kihyeon An	South Korea	DNF
	Eunju Baek	South Korea	DNF
	Yunmi Lee	South Korea	DNF
	Lauma Čerņevska	Latvia	DNF
	Aiga Taulīna	Latvia	DNF
	Patricija Tomasun	Lithuania	DNF
	Shamiera Auther	Malaysia	DNF
	Izzah Hazirah Binti Abdul Malek	Malaysia	DNF
	Kona Binti Liau A Ken	Malaysia	DNF
	Angeline Cabalo	Philippines	DNF
	Gretchen Felipe	Philippines	DNF
	Martyna Młynarczyk	Poland	DNF
	Maria Teresa Giardi	San Marino	DNF
	Yi-Chun Chou	Chinese Taipei	DNF
	Wei-Ling Tseng	Chinese Taipei	DNF
	Chao-Wen Wang	Chinese Taipei	DNF
	Anna Opanasiuk	Ukraine	DNF
	Maryna Shapovalova	Ukraine	DNF
	Pilar Fernández	Uruguay	DNF
	Inga Aukštuolytė	Lithuania	DNF
	Rima Viliuniene	Lithuania	DNF
	Jasmine Sargeant	Australia	DNF
	Laura Hottenrott	Germany	DNF
	Yenni Susano	Mexico	DNF
	Eli Anne Dvergsdal	Norway	DNF
	Ercília Machado	Portugal	DNF
	Cristina Simion	Romania	DNF
	Hanna Darmohrai	Ukraine	DNF
	Brittany Charboneau	United States	DNF
	Bailey Kowalczyk	United States	DNF
	Graciela Jakeline Rodriguez Rojas	Bolivia	DNF
	Roxana Paola Flores	Argentina	DNS
	Jessica Jason	Australia	DNS
	Sandra Plaza Cespedes	Bolivia	DNS
	Barbora Macurová	Czech Republic	DNS
	Laura Marie Sommer Hulgaard	Denmark	DNS
	Anna-Stiina Erkkilä	Finland	DNS
	Ruut Uusitalo	Finland	DNS
	Esther Eustache	France	DNS
	Sarah Kistner	Germany	DNS

=== 2023 World Mountain Running Championships Short trail Women’s Team Standings ===
Team

Rank	Team	Athletes	Time
1st place, gold medalist(s)	France	4:53:12 Clementine Geofffray; 5:20:21 Louise Serban-Penhoat; 5:22:20 Lucille Germain	15:35:53
2nd place, silver medalist(s)	Switzerland	4:55:13 Judith Wyder; 5:09:29 Theresa Leboeuf; 5:39:32 Nina Zoller	15:44:14
3rd place, bronze medalist(s)	United States	5:11:55 Jennifer Lichter; 5:19:43 Emkay Sullivan; 5:22:51 Kimber Mattox	15:54:29
4	Sweden	5:15:11 Emilia Brangefält; 5:18:45 Emelie Forsberg; 5:32:51 Johanna Gelfgren	16:06:47
5	Spain	5:18:45 Oihana Kortazar; 5:21:43 Julia Font; 5:33:06 Ikram Rharsalla	16:13:34
6	Italy	5:20:55 Cecilia Basso; 5:27:14 Fabiola Conti; 5:27:16 Alice Gaggi	16:15:25
7	Germany	5:16:34 Daniela Oemus; 5:31:28 Anja Kobs; 5:37:12 Lena Laukner	16:25:14
8	United Kingdom	5:23:30 Eleanor Davis; 5:44:22 Sharon Taylor; 6:20:22 Catherine Taylor	17:28:14
9	Canada	5:36:45 Kalie McCrystal; 5:56:10 Emilie Mann; 6:09:21 Shannon Penway	17:42:16
10	Austria	5:38:21 Johanna Hiemer; 5:54:28 Michaela Pilat; 6:10:39 Isabell Bichler	17:43:28
11	New Zealand	5:21:10 Caitlin Fielder; 5:57:34 Katie Morgan; 6:26:07 Jessica Campbell	17:44:51
12	Portugal	5:52:13 Inês João; 6:00:40 Cristina Arreiol; 6:01:20 Beatriz Alves	17:54:13
13	Iceland	5:42:14 Andrea Kolbeinsdóttir; 6:12:19 Sigþóra Brynja Kristjánsdóttir; 6:17:44 Anna Pálmadóttir	18:12:17
14	Romania	5:59:26 Andreea Alina Piscu; 6:07:56 Oana Mihalcea; 6:28:39 Raluca Adriana Burtea	18:36:01
15	Argentina	6:17:42 Maria Ines Chrestia; 6:22:50 Florencia Soledad Iuorno; 6:27:24 Tamara Isabel Lopez	19:07:56
16	Slovakia	6:10:40 Ivana Líšková; 6:24:25 Vanda Jenejová; 7:16:36 Veronika Páleniková	19:51:41
17	Ecuador	6:27:52 Olga Nataly Torres Guzman; 6:36:00 Andrea Vanessa Eras Quirola; 7:08:23 Alejandra Valeria Maldonado Cachumba	20:12:15
18	Chile	6:43:53 Dominga Villarino; 6:44:00 Katherine Cañete; 6:46:11 Patricia Cobi	20:14:04
19	Croatia	6:28:30 Mirjana Šimek Bilić; 6:38:55 Vana Čargonja; 7:07:33 Irena Smojver	20:14:58
20	Ireland	6:13:14 Laura O'Driscoll; 6:54:27 Elizabeth Wheeler; 7:14:22 Jan Corcoran	20:22:03
21	Denmark	6:50:26 Stine Katrine Baekgaard Olsen; 6:56:45 Simone Haastrup; 6:56:56 Amalie Wærum Hauge Bengtsson	20:44:07

=== 2023 World Mountain Running Championships Long trail Men’s Standings ===
Distance 86.9km, total ascent of 6,500 m, total descent of 6,920 m.

Rank	Name	Nationality	Time	Notes
1st place, gold medalist(s)	Benjamin Roubiol	France	9:52:59	
2nd place, silver medalist(s)	Andreas Reiterer	Italy	10:00:46	
3rd place, bronze medalist(s)	Peter Fraňo	Slovakia	10:02:10	
4	Thibaut Garrivier	France	10:14:49	
5	Drew Holmen	United States	10:15:40	
6	Zach Miller	United States	10:15:45	
7	Eric Lipuma	United States	10:16:52	
8	Ramon Manetsch	Switzerland	10:17:13	
9	Tomáš Farník	Czech Republic	10:18:02	
10	Walter Manser	Switzerland	10:19:19	
11	Thomas Joly De Lotbiniare	United Kingdom	10:22:39	
12	Andrei Gabriel Preda	Romania	10:32:55	
13	Fotios Zisimopoulos	Greece	10:33:18	
14	Hannes Namberger	Germany	10:33:47	
15	Davide Cheraz	Italy	10:34:34	
16	Nelson Santos	Portugal	10:34:51	
17	Baptiste Chassagne	France	10:35:21	
18	Tobias Dahl Fenre	Norway	10:37:30	
19	Ionel Cristian Manole	Romania	10:40:54	
20	Alexander Hutter	Austria	10:45:47	
21	Catalin Sorecau	Romania	10:52:22	
22	Joaquin Andres Lopez Iturralde	Ecuador	10:52:32	
23	Philipp Ausserhofer	Italy	10:54:35	
24	Christian Stern	Austria	10:57:31	
25	Kamil Leśniak	Poland	11:00:10	
26	Simon Desvaux De Marigny	Mauritius	11:00:48	
27	Francisco Xavier Pinto Moreno	Ecuador	11:01:12	
28	Raphael Sprenger	Switzerland	11:02:42	
29	Aasmund Kjøllmoen Steien	Norway	11:03:31	
30	Koken Ogasawara	Japan	11:04:57	
31	Kok Wai Tse	Hong Kong	11:05:51	
31	Yuya Kawasaki	Japan	11:05:51	
33	Snorri Björnsson	Iceland	11:08:17	
34	Adrian Niski	Germany	11:08:42	
35	Marián Priadka	Slovakia	11:13:46	
36	Hiroki Kai	Japan	11:13:59	
37	Aritz Egea	Spain	11:14:56	
38	Tomáš Maceček	Czech Republic	11:15:50	
39	Weston Hill	New Zealand	11:17:32	
40	Jupiter Carera	Mexico	11:18:11	
41	Ho Chung Wong	Hong Kong	11:20:59	
42	Didrik Grytbak Hermansen	Norway	11:21:46	
43	Jean-Philippe Thibodeau	Canada	11:23:44	
44	Daniel Claassen	South Africa	11:24:42	
45	Juan Belman	Mexico	11:26:17	
46	Bruno Sousa	Portugal	11:30:44	
47	Florian Grasel	Austria	11:39:24	
48	Tomasz Skupień	Poland	11:39:52	
49	Onorio Tomas	Mexico	11:40:45	
50	Arjun Rai Kulung	Nepal	11:41:21	
51	Erland Åkra Eldrup	Norway	11:42:24	
52	Riccardo Borgialli	Italy	11:43:45	
53	Christian Meier	Canada	11:46:11	
54	Rikki Wynne	Ireland	11:47:22	
55	Santiago Margozzini	Chile	11:48:25	
56	Luciano Pilatti	Argentina	11:51:08	
57	Janez Klančnik	Slovenia	11:51:40	
58	Harry Jones	United Kingdom	11:52:42	
59	Pawel Czerniak	Poland	11:56:53	
60	Borja Fernández	Spain	11:57:58	
61	Miklós Őri	Hungary	11:57:58	
62	Jeffrey Campbell	Canada	11:58:01	
63	David Jeker	Canada	11:58:10	
64	Christian Calderón	Chile	12:04:19	
65	Maximiliano Vazquez	Uruguay	12:07:13	
66	Galen Reynolds	Canada	12:08:25	
67	Eduardo Müller	Chile	12:10:01	
68	Michael Skobierski	Austria	12:10:59	
69	Arnie Macañeras	Philippines	12:12:15	
70	Facundo Alejo Nuñer	Argentina	12:18:36	
71	Milton Amat	Malaysia	12:19:21	
72	Kristian Joergensen	Denmark	12:20:10	
73	Fernando Rubén Mendieta	Argentina	12:20:30	
74	Matic Čačulovič	Slovenia	12:20:44	
75	Dillon Mcevoy	Ireland	12:22:42	
76	Thomas Dade	Australia	12:23:00	
77	Vaidas Zlabys	Lithuania	12:31:17	
78	Christiaan Greyling	South Africa	12:36:26	
79	Larry Apolinario	Philippines	12:36:26	
79	John Ray Onifa	Philippines	12:36:26	
81	Hirokazu Nishimura	Japan	12:37:31	
82	Slovak Ianco	Romania	12:41:01	
83	Luca Arrigoni	Italy	12:42:20	
84	Manuel Bonardi	Italy	12:42:20	
85	Matej Nidorfer	Slovenia	12:44:36	
86	Pedro Barros	Portugal	12:47:44	
87	Max Moberg	Finland	12:48:06	
88	Chun Kit Tsang	Hong Kong	12:52:36	
89	Thorbergur Ingi Jónsson	Iceland	12:58:32	
90	Caleb Olson	United States	12:58:32	
91	Gavin Byrne	Ireland	12:58:35	
92	Mario Weiss	Austria	13:00:33	
93	Samuel Hansby	New Zealand	13:01:07	
94	András Herczog	Hungary	13:01:19	
95	Wilmer Joffre Lopez Muñoz	Ecuador	13:05:55	
96	Edvardas Moseika	Lithuania	13:08:35	
97	Pēteris Grīviņš	Latvia	13:08:35	
98	Andrew Gaskell	Australia	13:10:17	
99	Pablo Ariel Nadalez	Argentina	13:11:04	
100	Dávid Kovács	Hungary	13:11:17	
101	Alberto Gonzalez Acuña	Uruguay	13:14:44	
102	Marcelo Muñoz	Chile	13:22:37	
103	Rommel Stalyn Sanchez Quimbiamba	Ecuador	13:27:13	
104	Martín Alejandro Balliro	Argentina	13:27:14	
105	Oleksii Melnyk	Ukraine	13:28:04	
106	Bastien Missud	Australia	13:28:24	
107	Majell Backhausen	Australia	13:34:29	
108	Enzo Ferrari	Chile	13:35:28	
109	Nenad Ostojić	Croatia	13:40:36	
110	Cillian Fleming	Ireland	13:41:07	
111	Nigel Hill	Australia	13:53:55	
112	Brandon Miller	Canada	13:58:56	
113	Tomi Mikkola	Finland	14:02:26	
114	Benjamin Vuk	Croatia	14:11:07	
115	Gonzalo Caballero	Uruguay	14:13:42	
116	Darko Rogina	Croatia	14:20:17	
117	Valdas Rubel	Lithuania	14:22:20	
118	Antonio Ramirez	Mexico	14:22:28	
119	Jose Nieto	Mexico	14:29:29	
120	Peng-Chung Chen	Chinese Taipei	14:35:15	
121	Gustavo Jimenez Rosillo	Ecuador	14:40:03	
122	Yen-Tsung Chen	Chinese Taipei	14:44:55	
	Franco Hernán Oro	Argentina	DNF	
	Célio Rosa	Brazil	DNF	
	Emmanuel Acuña	Chile	DNF	
	Marko Martinčić	Croatia	DNF	
	Stjepan Radić	Croatia	DNF	
	Hrvoje Vlašić	Croatia	DNF	
	Jesper Meins	Denmark	DNF	
	José Angel Fernández	Spain	DNF	
	Alejandro Mayor	Spain	DNF	
	Marcos Ramos	Spain	DNF	
	Eetu Nordman	Finland	DNF	
	Nicolas Martin	France	DNF	
	Paul Mathou	France	DNF	
	George Foster	United Kingdom	DNF	
	Alexander Dautel	Germany	DNF	
	Florian Reichert	Germany	DNF	
	Ryunosuke Omi	Japan	DNF	
	Yamato Yoshino	Japan	DNF	
	Sangjun Lee	South Korea	DNF	
	Sungchan Park	South Korea	DNF	
	Didzis Glušņevs	Latvia	DNF	
	Artūrs Vadzis	Latvia	DNF	
	Emilis Domarkas	Lithuania	DNF	
	Jonas Narkeliunas	Lithuania	DNF	
	Muhammad Aqmal Hakim Bin Mohd Adzmi	Malaysia	DNF	
	Daved Simpat	Malaysia	DNF	
	Wayne Botha	New Zealand	DNF	
	Diego Enrique Marin	Paraguay	DNF	
	Julio César Román	Paraguay	DNF	
	Joel Román Vallejos	Paraguay	DNF	
	Carlos Ferreira	Portugal	DNF	
	André Rodrigues	Portugal	DNF	
	Octaviu Raul Butaci	Romania	DNF	
	Alberto Zanchi	San Marino	DNF	
	Martin Lustenberger	Switzerland	DNF	
	Gian Marchet Schicktanz	Switzerland	DNF	
	Yi-Lin Chung	Chinese Taipei	DNF	
	Ignacio Garrone Deicas	Uruguay	DNF	
	Preston Cates	United States	DNF	
	Windy Erlin Arévalo Encinas	Bolivia	DNS	
	Peiquan You	China	DNS	
	Ricardo Cherta	Spain	DNS	
	Hemant Limbu	India	DNS	
	Gyehoon Jo	South Korea	DNS	
	Jim Walmsley	United States	DNS	
	Jakob Herrmann	Austria	DNS	
	Mads Flensted Louring	Denmark	DNS	
	Romain Maillard	France	DNS	
	Owen Davies	United Kingdom	DNS	
	Joshua Wade	United Kingdom	DNS	
	Francesco Cucco	Italy	DNS	
	Riccardo Montani	Italy	DNS	
	Ezekiel Cheruiyot Kurui	Kenya	DNS	
	Andris Ronimoiss	Latvia	DNS	
	Oleksandr Skorokhod	Ukraine	DNS	

=== 2023 World Mountain Running Championships Long trail Men’s Team Standings ===
Rank	Country	Racers	Score
1st place, gold medalist(s)	France	9:52:59 Benjamin Roubiol; 10:14:49 Thibaut Garrivier; 10:35:21 Baptiste Chassagne	30:43:09
2nd place, silver medalist(s)	United States	10:15:40 Drew Holmen; 10:15:45 Zach Miller; 10:16:52 Eric Lipuma	30:48:17
3rd place, bronze medalist(s)	Italy	10:00:46 Andreas Reiterer; 10:34:34 Davide Cheraz; 10:54:35 Philipp Ausserhofer	31:29:55
4	Switzerland	10:17:13 Ramon Manetsch; 10:19:19 Walter Manser; 11:02:42 Raphael Sprenger	31:39:14
5	Romania	10:32:55 Andrei Gabriel Preda; 10:40:54 Ionel Cristian Manole; 10:52:22 Catalin Sorecau	32:06:11
6	Norway	10:37:30 Tobias Dahl Fenre; 11:03:31 Aasmund Kjøllmoen Steien; 11:21:46 Didrik Grytbak Hermansen	33:02:47
7	Austria	10:45:47 Alexander Hutter; 10:57:31 Christian Stern; 11:39:24 Florian Grasel	33:22:42
8	Japan	11:04:57 Koken Ogasawara; 11:05:51 Yuya Kawasaki; 11:13:59 Hiroki Kai	33:24:47
9	Mexico	11:18:11 Jupiter Carera; 11:26:17 Juan Belman; 11:40:45 Onorio Tomas	34:25:13
10	Poland	11:00:10 Kamil Leśniak; 11:39:52 Tomasz Skupień; 11:56:53 Pawel Czerniak	34:36:55
11	Portugal	10:34:51 Nelson Santos; 11:30:44 Bruno Sousa; 12:47:44 Pedro Barros	34:53:19
12	Ecuador	10:52:32 Joaquin Andres Lopez Iturralde; 11:01:12 Francisco Xavier Pinto Moreno; 13:05:55 Wilmer Joffre Lopez Muñoz	34:59:39
13	Canada	11:23:44 Jean-Philippe Thibodeau; 11:46:11 Christian Meier; 11:58:01 Jeffrey Campbell	35:07:56
14	Hong Kong	11:05:51 Kok Wai Tse; 11:20:59 Ho Chung Wong; 12:52:36 Chun Kit Tsang	35:19:26
15	Chile	11:48:25 Santiago Margozzini; 12:04:19 Christian Calderón; 12:10:01 Eduardo Müller	36:02:45
16	Argentina	11:51:08 Luciano Pilatti; 12:18:36 Facundo Alejo Nuñer; 12:20:30 Fernando Rubén Mendieta	36:30:14
17	Slovenia	11:51:40 Janez Klančnik; 12:20:44 Matic Čačulovič; 12:44:36 Matej Nidorfer	36:57:00
18	Ireland	11:47:22 Rikki Wynne; 12:22:42 Dillon Mcevoy; 12:58:35 Gavin Byrne	37:08:39
19	Philippines	12:12:15 Arnie Macañeras; 12:36:26 Larry Apolinario; 12:36:26 John Ray Onifa	37:25:07
20	Hungary	11:57:58 Miklós Őri; 13:01:19 András Herczog; 13:11:17 Dávid Kovács	38:10:34
21	Australia	12:23:00 Thomas Dade; 13:10:17 Andrew Gaskell; 13:28:24 Bastien Missud	39:01:41
22	Uruguay	12:07:13 Maximiliano Vazquez; 13:14:44 Alberto Gonzalez Acuña; 14:13:42 Gonzalo Caballero	39:35:39
23	Lithuania	12:31:17 Vaidas Zlabys; 13:08:35 Edvardas Moseika; 14:22:20 Valdas Rubel	40:02:12
24	Croatia	13:40:36 Nenad Ostojić; 14:11:07 Benjamin Vuk; 14:20:17 Darko Rogina	42:12:00

=== 2023 World Mountain Running Championships Long trail Women’s Standings ===
Distance 86.9km, total ascent of 6,500 m, total descent of 6,920 m.

Rank	Name	Nationality	Time	Notes
1st place, gold medalist(s)	Marion Delespierre	France	11:22:31	
2nd place, silver medalist(s)	Katharina Hartmuth	Germany	11:29:14	
3rd place, bronze medalist(s)	Manon Bohard Cailler	France	11:34:22	
4	Martina Valmassoi	Italy	11:44:50	
5	Rosanna Buchauer	Germany	11:45:58	
6	Allison Baca	United States	11:56:21	
7	Emily Schmitz	United States	11:58:31	
8	Mari Klakegg Fenre	Norway	12:00:57	
9	Akiyama Honoka	Japan	12:01:23	
10	Audrey Tanguy	France	12:01:30	
11	Rosa María Lara	Spain	12:09:05	
12	Marcela Vašínová	Czech Republic	12:09:39	
13	Giuditta Turini	Italy	12:15:21	
14	Sara-Rebekka Færø Linde	Norway	12:16:21	
15	Ida-Sophie Hegemann	Germany	12:16:49	
16	Marina Cugnetto	Italy	12:19:57	
17	Jocelyne Pauly	France	12:25:17	
18	Fiona Pascall	United Kingdom	12:25:54	
19	Claudia Rosegger	Austria	12:42:45	
20	Eva-Maria Sperger	Germany	12:45:34	
21	Paulina Tracz	Poland	12:45:38	
22	Genma Arenas Alcazar	Spain	12:47:30	
23	Esther Fellhofer	Austria	12:49:49	
24	Sarah Keyes	United States	12:51:05	
25	Martina Klančnik Potrč	Slovenia	12:51:17	
26	Sara Escobar Carron	Switzerland	12:52:58	
27	Marjo Liikanen	Finland	12:53:45	
28	Camilla Spagnol	Italy	13:00:26	
29	Francesca Pretto	Italy	13:03:08	
30	Dominique Van Mechgelen	Belgium	13:04:52	
31	Jasmin Paris	United Kingdom	13:05:15	
32	Marisa Vieira	Portugal	13:05:40	
33	Shea Aquilano	United States	13:09:58	
34	Arden Young	Canada	13:10:54	
35	Giovanna Rodrigues Costa Martins	Brazil	13:27:05	
36	Yuri Yoshizumi	Japan	13:27:56	
37	Man Yee Cheung	Hong Kong	13:29:43	
38	Jessica Geovana Tipan Gutierrez	Ecuador	13:30:08	
39	Elisabeth Borgersen	Norway	13:30:46	
40	Marie-Luise Mühlhuber	Germany	13:30:56	
41	Julia Davis	United Kingdom	13:38:17	
42	Vera Bernardo	Portugal	13:41:26	
43	Halldóra Huld Ingvarsdóttir	Iceland	13:41:49	
44	Irén Tiricz	Hungary	13:42:47	
45	Katja Kegl Vencelj	Slovenia	13:43:46	
46	Anne-Marie Madden	Canada	13:44:38	
47	Mylene Sansoucy	Canada	13:46:21	
48	Carolina Tania Diaz Estevez	Argentina	13:46:32	
49	Paula Barbosa	Portugal	13:46:44	
50	Linda Boldāne	Latvia	13:49:35	
50	Therese Dahl Årvik	Norway	13:49:35	
52	Genevieve Asselin Demers	Canada	13:57:14	
53	Christina Giazitzidou	Greece	14:05:35	
54	Rebecca Quinn	Ireland	14:12:35	
55	Anabel Estefania Oviedo Zelarayán	Argentina	14:15:07	
56	Nicole Paton	Australia	14:17:40	
57	Rannveig Oddsdóttir	Iceland	14:18:10	
58	Veronika Jurišić	Croatia	14:23:05	
59	Nádia Casteleiro	Portugal	14:26:50	
60	Laura Seskiene	Lithuania	14:31:12	
61	Eulalia Margarita Paucar Quezada	Ecuador	14:31:43	
62	Henna Ahomies	Finland	14:35:29	
63	Elizabeth Dangadang	Philippines	14:36:25	
64	Katarzyna Wilk	Poland	14:40:56	
65	Clare Gallagher	United States	14:46:26	
66	Claire O'Brien-Smith	Australia	14:50:17	
67	Nayeli De La Torre	Mexico	15:05:27	
68	Veronika Haas	Austria	15:07:05	
69	Oksana Riabova	Ukraine	15:22:07	
	Veronica Palmira Filippa	Argentina	DNF	
	María Silvina Perez	Argentina	DNF	
	María Luciana Urioste Correa	Argentina	DNF	
	Adriana Vanesa Vargas	Argentina	DNF	
	Sarah Ludowici	Australia	DNF	
	Hayley Teale	Australia	DNF	
	Yvonne Keil	Austria	DNF	
	Jade Belzberg	Canada	DNF	
	Alissa St Laurent	Canada	DNF	
	Pamela Angel	Chile	DNF	
	Carla Fuenzalida	Chile	DNF	
	Patricia González	Chile	DNF	
	Constanza Leal	Chile	DNF	
	Mariana Leal	Chile	DNF	
	Alejandra Vergara	Chile	DNF	
	Maja Bonačić	Croatia	DNF	
	Anita Lackovic	Croatia	DNF	
	Maja Urban	Croatia	DNF	
	Paula Vrdoljak	Croatia	DNF	
	Maria Emilia Crespo Barahona	Ecuador	DNF	
	Maria Vallejo Salgado	Ecuador	DNF	
	Azara García	Spain	DNF	
	Jasmina Nikula	Finland	DNF	
	Blandine L'Hirondel	France	DNF	
	Meryl Cooper	United Kingdom	DNF	
	Emőke Paál	Hungary	DNF	
	Sarah Brady	Ireland	DNF	
	Aoife Mundow	Ireland	DNF	
	Takako Takamura	Japan	DNF	
	Seola Jung	South Korea	DNF	
	Jinhee Kim	South Korea	DNF	
	Sanglim Lee	South Korea	DNF	
	Viviāna Kirilova	Latvia	DNF	
	Linda Meirēna	Latvia	DNF	
	Ieva Upmace-Grīviņa	Latvia	DNF	
	Viktorija Kalvelyte	Lithuania	DNF	
	Lina Pranyte	Lithuania	DNF	
	Deimante Razukiene	Lithuania	DNF	
	Toma Valeikaite	Lithuania	DNF	
	Mei Sze Chong	Malaysia	DNF	
	Siok Har Lim	Malaysia	DNF	
	Sally Ann Yap Yu Ing	Malaysia	DNF	
	Belen Benjamin	Mexico	DNF	
	Sunmaya Budha	Nepal	DNF	
	Sworupa Khadka	Nepal	DNF	
	Shannon-Leigh Litt	New Zealand	DNF	
	Eveling Violeta Alarcon	Paraguay	DNF	
	Maria Sotelo	Paraguay	DNF	
	Agustoralin Sabanal	Philippines	DNF	
	Cecille Wael	Philippines	DNF	
	Katarzyna Solinska	Poland	DNF	
	Sofia Roquete	Portugal	DNF	
	Barbara Jolić	Slovenia	DNF	
	Kathrin Götz	Switzerland	DNF	
	Hsiu-Ching Chen	Chinese Taipei	DNF	
	Hsuan-Yu Chen	Chinese Taipei	DNF	
	Ling-Chun Chou	Chinese Taipei	DNF	
	Olena Khashko	Ukraine	DNF	
	Yuliya Tarasova	Ukraine	DNF	
	Hannah Osowski	United States	DNF	
	Lucinda Bartholomew	Australia	DNS	
	Anna Mckenna	Australia	DNS	
	Johanna Antila	Finland	DNS	
	Lisa Watson	United Kingdom	DNS	
	Ildikó Wermescher	Hungary	DNS	
	Emily Vaudan	Switzerland	DNS	

=== 2023 World Mountain Running Championships Long trail Women’s Team Standings ===
Rank	Country	Racers	Score
1st place, gold medalist(s)	France	11:22:31 Marion Delespierre; 11:34:22 Manon Bohard Cailler; 12:01:30 Audrey Tanguy	34:58:23
2nd place, silver medalist(s)	Germany	11:29:14 Katharina Hartmuth; 11:45:58 Rosanna Buchauer; 12:16:49 Ida-Sophie Hegemann	35:32:01
3rd place, bronze medalist(s)	Italy	11:44:50 Martina Valmassoi; 12:15:21 Giuditta Turini; 12:19:57 Marina Cugnetto	36:20:08
4.	United States	11:56:21 Allison Baca; 11:58:31 Emily Schmitz; 12:51:05 Sarah Keyes	36:45:57
5.	Norway	12:00:57 Mari Klakegg Fenre; 12:16:21 Sara-Rebekka Færø Linde; 13:30:46 Elisabeth Borgersen	37:48:04
6.	United Kingdom	12:25:54 Fiona Pascall; 13:05:15 Jasmin Paris; 13:38:17 Julia Davis	39:09:26
7.	Portugal	13:05:40 Marisa Vieira; 13:41:26 Vera Bernardo; 13:46:44 Paula Barbosa	40:33:50
8.	Austria	12:42:45 Claudia Rosegger; 12:49:49 Esther Fellhofer; 15:07:05 Veronika Haas	40:39:39
9.	Canada	13:10:54 Arden Young; 13:44:38 Anne-Marie Madden; 13:46:21 Mylene Sansoucy	40:41:53

=== 2023 World Mountain Running Championships Up and downhill mountain race (Mountain Classic) Men's Standings ===
Distance 15.0 km, total ascent of 750 m, total descent of 750 m.

Rank	Name	Nationality	Time	Notes
1st place, gold medalist(s)	Leonard Chemutai	Uganda	56:14	
2nd place, silver medalist(s)	Ombogo Kiriago Philemon	Kenya	56:22	
3rd place, bronze medalist(s)	Filimon Abraham	Germany	56:27	
4	Eliud Cherop	Uganda	57:26	
5	Patrick Kipngeno	Kenya	57:27	
6	Alejandro García	Spain	59:25	
7	Cesare Maestri	Italy	59:28	
8	Josphat Kiprotich	Kenya	59:34	
9	Xavier Chevrier	Italy	59:43	
10	Andreu Blanes	Spain	59:54	
11	Julius Ott	Germany	59:58	
12	Theodore Klein	France	1:00:20	
13	Liam Meirow	United States	1:00:26	
14	Alberto Vender	Italy	1:00:32	
15	Emmanuel Meyssat	France	1:00:44	
16	Alexandre Ricard	Canada	1:00:48	
17	Johan Bugge	Norway	1:00:51	
18	Joe Steward	United Kingdom	1:00:54	
19	Jáchym Kovář	Czech Republic	1:01:07	
20	Jacob Adkin	United Kingdom	1:01:16	
21	Erenjia Jia	China	1:01:18	
22	Andrew Douglas	United Kingdom	1:01:25	
23	Luciano Rota	Italy	1:01:28	
24	Jonas Soldini	Switzerland	1:01:28	
25	Marcin Kubica	Poland	1:01:35	
26	Casey Campbell	United States	1:01:38	
27	Ibai Larrea	Spain	1:01:42	
28	Marek Chrascina	Czech Republic	1:02:10	
29	Pedro Jose Puentes Figueroa	Venezuela	1:02:33	
30	Miguel Perez	Mexico	1:02:43	
31	Christopher Richards	United Kingdom	1:02:50	
32	Michał Olejnik	Poland	1:02:52	
33	Sam Hendry	Canada	1:03:01	
34	Javier Adolfo Carriqueo	Argentina	1:03:11	
35	Timotej Bečan	Slovenia	1:03:14	
36	Augusto Geovanny Andrade Paguay	Ecuador	1:03:15	
37	Matěj Zima	Czech Republic	1:03:16	
38	Dominik Tabor	Poland	1:03:23	
39	Rares Imre Miklos	Romania	1:03:35	
40	Fabian Aebersold	Switzerland	1:03:45	
41	Sipho Mbanjwa	South Africa	1:03:51	
42	Piotr Łobodziński	Poland	1:03:53	
43	Maximilian Zeus	Germany	1:04:01	
44	Michal Šmahel	Czech Republic	1:04:04	
45	Diego Ignacio Diaz	Chile	1:04:24	
46	Dismas Yeko	Uganda	1:04:25	
47	Quentin Meyleu	France	1:04:26	
48	Marius Valentin Popa	Romania	1:04:33	
49	Carlos Lopes	Portugal	1:04:38	
50	Siboniso Soldaka	South Africa	1:04:43	
51	Eduardo Hernández	Spain	1:04:50	
52	Alexandre Fine	France	1:04:51	
53	Toby Batchelor	New Zealand	1:04:56	
54	Gabriel Muñoz	Chile	1:05:13	
55	Luke Micallef	Malta	1:05:15	
56	Killian Mooney	Ireland	1:05:26	
57	Martin Mattle	Austria	1:05:30	
58	Ákos Molnár	Hungary	1:05:31	
59	Paulo Macedo	Portugal	1:05:51	
60	Robert Mccann	Canada	1:06:00	
61	Jeremy Hunt	Australia	1:06:03	
62	Tomas Reyes	Mexico	1:06:04	
63	Martin Enzenberger	Austria	1:06:06	
64	Peter-Daniel Herman	Romania	1:06:30	
65	Morgan Elliott	United States	1:06:31	
66	Oscar Paul Basantes Guañuna	Ecuador	1:06:34	
67	Klemen Španring	Slovenia	1:06:36	
68	Daniel Lustenberger	Switzerland	1:06:38	
69	Raoul Raus	Belgium	1:06:46	
70	William Ricardo Aveiro	Paraguay	1:06:54	
71	Nathan Pearce	Australia	1:07:19	
72	Simon Spiteri	Malta	1:07:26	
73	Niam Macdonald	New Zealand	1:07:34	
74	Halfdan-Emil Færø	Norway	1:07:45	
75	Lari Takanen	Finland	1:07:50	
76	Alexis Castro Calce	Uruguay	1:08:12	
77	Ezequiel Antonio Lopez	Argentina	1:08:13	
78	Llewellyn Groeneveld	South Africa	1:08:13	
79	Patrik Juhász	Hungary	1:08:16	
80	Leo Peterson	Australia	1:08:18	
81	Andy Good	New Zealand	1:08:28	
82	Jeffrey Archer	Canada	1:08:35	
83	Pedro Miguel Rodrigues	Portugal	1:08:43	
84	Timothy Johnston	Ireland	1:08:48	
85	Hugo Contreras	Chile	1:08:52	
86	Philipp Stuckhardt	Germany	1:08:59	
87	Eduardo Pestana	Portugal	1:09:08	
88	James Kevan	Ireland	1:09:09	
89	David Alexander Nieva	Argentina	1:09:12	
90	Kristaps Bērziņš	Latvia	1:09:20	
91	Harald Kårbö	Norway	1:09:30	
92	Lorenzo Bugli	San Marino	1:09:32	
93	Max Napoleon Rohoden Jaramillo	Ecuador	1:09:38	
94	Eoin Lennon	Ireland	1:10:04	
95	Zoltán Vigh	Hungary	1:10:09	
96	Luis Fernando Ordoñez	Mexico	1:10:19	
97	Frank Dariel Castro Perú	Cuba	1:10:45	
98	Brian Rubén Burgos	Argentina	1:10:58	
99	Edgars Daugulis	Latvia	1:11:04	
100	Georgi Zhekov	Bulgaria	1:11:16	
101	Samu Heiska	Finland	1:12:13	
102	Darío Campos	Chile	1:12:25	
103	Alvaro Mauricio Carranza Olivo	Ecuador	1:12:34	
104	Jānis Mežiels	Latvia	1:12:54	
105	Marco Francioni	San Marino	1:13:07	
106	Ewan Shingler	Australia	1:14:22	
107	Roberto Del Valle	Mexico	1:14:52	
108	Andrejs Dmitrijevs	Latvia	1:16:17	
109	Cristian Ariel Aranda	Paraguay	1:16:58	
110	Jake Fenech	Malta	1:17:08	
111	Karim Ramadan	Lebanon	1:18:54	
112	Michele Agostini	San Marino	1:19:10	
113	Valentas Uža	Lithuania	1:21:18	
114	Sagar Khemani	India	1:21:24	
115	Gediminas Viliunas	Lithuania	1:21:54	
116	Donatas Jocius	Lithuania	1:23:55	
117	Farrell Hedrick	Cambodia	1:29:03	
118	Elmir Askarov	Azerbaijan	1:30:47	
119	Oliver Horst Kroll	Paraguay	1:30:57	
120	Haim Malka	Israel	1:53:58	
	Manuel Innerhofer	Austria	DNF	
	Hillary Kimaiyo	Kenya	DNF	
	Mbuleli Mathanga	South Africa	DNF	
	Dominik Rolli	Switzerland	DNF	
	Isaac Mande Kibet	Uganda	DNF	
	Dan Curts	United States	DNF	
	Joel Torrez Cruz	Bolivia	DNS	
	Ammarith Ann	Cambodia	DNS	
	Joel Dyrhovden	Norway	DNS	
	Alexis Castro Calce	Uruguay	DNS	
	Alvaro Mauricio Carranza Olivo	Ecuador	DNS	
	Kouider Bouregba	Algeria	DNS	
	Yousheng Guan	China	DNS	
	Tao Luo	China	DNS	
	Juwei Zi	China	DNS	
	Miquel Corbera	Spain	DNS	
	Finlay Grant	United Kingdom	DNS	
	Isacco Costa	Italy	DNS	
	Marco Filosi	Italy	DNS	
	Roberto Delorenzi	Switzerland	DNS	

=== 2023 World Mountain Running Championships Up and downhill mountain race (Mountain Classic) Men's Team Standings ===
Rank	Country	Racers	Score
1st place, gold medalist(s)	Kenya	2 Ombogo Kiriago Philemon; 5 Patrick Kipngeno; 8 Josphat Kiprotich	15 pts
2nd place, silver medalist(s)	Italy	7 Cesare Maestri; 9 Xavier Chevrier; 14 Alberto Vender	30 pts
3rd place, bronze medalist(s)	Spain	6 Alejandro García; 10 Andreu Blanes; 27 Ibai Larrea	43 pts
4.	Uganda	1 Leonard Chemutai; 4 Eliud Cherop; 46 Dismas Yeko	51 pts
5.	Germany	3 Filimon Abraham; 11 Julius Ott; 43 Maximilian Zeus	57 pts
6.	United Kingdom	18 Joe Steward; 20 Jacob Adkin; 22 Andrew Douglas	60 pts
7.	France	12 Theodore Klein; 15 Emmanuel Meyssat; 47 Quentin Meyleu	74 pts
8.	Czech Republic	19 Jáchym Kovář; 28 Marek Chrascina; 37 Matěj Zima	84 pts
9.	Poland	25 Marcin Kubica; 32 Michał Olejnik; 38 Dominik Tabor	95 pts
10.	United States	13 Liam Meirow; 26 Casey Campbell; 65 Morgan Elliott	104 pts
11.	Canada	16 Alexandre Ricard; 33 Sam Hendry; 60 Robert Mccann	109 pts
12.	Switzerland	24 Jonas Soldini; 40 Fabian Aebersold; 68 Daniel Lustenberger	132 pts
13.	Romania	39 Rares Imre Miklos; 48 Marius Valentin Popa; 64 Peter-Daniel Herman	151 pts
14.	South Africa	41 Sipho Mbanjwa; 50 Siboniso Soldaka; 78 Llewellyn Groeneveld	169 pts
15.	Norway	17 Johan Bugge; 74 Halfdan-Emil Færø; 91 Harald Kårbö	182 pts
16.	Chile	45 Diego Ignacio Diaz; 54 Gabriel Muñoz; 85 Hugo Contreras	184 pts
17.	Mexico	30 Miguel Perez; 62 Tomas Reyes; 96 Luis Fernando Ordoñez	188 pts
18.	Portugal	49 Carlos Lopes; 59 Paulo Macedo; 83 Pedro Miguel Rodrigues	191 pts
19.	Ecuador	36 Augusto Geovanny Andrade Paguay; 66 Oscar Paul Basantes Guañuna; 93 Max Napoleon Rohoden Jaramillo	195 pts
20.	Argentina	34 Javier Adolfo Carriqueo; 77 Ezequiel Antonio Lopez; 89 David Alexander Nieva	200 pts
21.	New Zealand	53 Toby Batchelor; 73 Niam Macdonald; 81 Andy Good	207 pts
22.	Australia	61 Jeremy Hunt; 71 Nathan Pearce; 80 Leo Peterson	212 pts
23.	Ireland	56 Killian Mooney; 84 Timothy Johnston; 88 James Kevan	228 pts
24.	Hungary	58 Ákos Molnár; 79 Patrik Juhász; 95 Zoltán Vigh	232 pts
25.	Malta	55 Luke Micallef; 72 Simon Spiteri; 110 Jake Fenech	237 pts
26.	Latvia	90 Kristaps Bērziņš; 99 Edgars Daugulis; 104 Jānis Mežiels	293 pts
27.	Paraguay	70 William Ricardo Aveiro; 109 Cristian Ariel Aranda; 119 Oliver Horst Kroll	298 pts
28.	San Marino	92 Lorenzo Bugli; 105 Marco Francioni; 112 Michele Agostini	309 pts
29.	Lithuania	113 Valentas Uža; 115 Gediminas Viliunas; 116 Donatas Jocius	344 pts

=== 2023 World Mountain Running Championships Up and downhill mountain race (Mountain Classic) Women's Standings ===
Distance 15.0 km, total ascent of 750 m, total descent of 750 m.

Rank	Name	Nationality	Time	Notes
1st place, gold medalist(s)	Grayson Murphy	United States	1:04:29	
2nd place, silver medalist(s)	Tove Alexandersson	Sweden	1:05:26	
3rd place, bronze medalist(s)	Joyce Muthoni	Kenya	1:06:40	
4	Valentine Jepkoech Rutto	Kenya	1:06:56	
5	Domenika Mayer	Germany	1:07:09	
6	Monica Madalina Florea	Romania	1:07:25	
7	Philaries Jeruto Kisang	Kenya	1:08:31	
8	Tereza Hrochová	Czech Republic	1:08:37	
9	Cecile Jarousseau	France	1:08:40	
10	Alice Goodall	United Kingdom	1:09:22	
11	Annet Chemengich Chelangat	Uganda	1:09:41	
12	Scout Adkin	United Kingdom	1:10:00	
13	Christel Dewalle	France	1:10:02	
14	Francesca Ghelfi	Italy	1:10:04	
15	Natalia Gemperle	Switzerland	1:10:10	
16	Silvia Schwaiger	Slovakia	1:10:13	
17	Anne-Marie Comeau	Canada	1:10:20	
18	Rebecca Cheptegei	Uganda	1:10:29	
19	Hanna Gröber	Germany	1:10:53	
20	Elisa Sortini	Italy	1:11:07	
21	Phillipa Williams	United Kingdom	1:11:21	
22	Onditz Iturbe	Spain	1:11:29	
23	Gladys Tejeda	Peru	1:11:40	
24	Elise Poncet	France	1:11:49	
25	Allie Mclaughlin	United States	1:12:36	
26	Lindsay Webster	Canada	1:12:50	
27	Lara Hamilton	Australia	1:13:00	
28	Karoline Holsen Kyte	Norway	1:13:06	
29	Malen Osa	Spain	1:13:12	
30	Sara Bottarelli	Italy	1:13:13	
31	Nora Markhus	Norway	1:13:22	
32	Rea Iseli	Switzerland	1:13:25	
33	Hana Švestková Stružková	Czech Republic	1:13:44	
34	Bianca Tarboton	South Africa	1:13:54	
35	Rachel Tomajczyk	United States	1:13:58	
36	Barbora Macurová	Czech Republic	1:14:02	
37	Nina Voelckel	Germany	1:14:02	
38	Chiara Milena Mainetti	Argentina	1:14:08	
39	Adéla Vetchá	Czech Republic	1:14:08	
40	Diana Landi Andrade	Ecuador	1:14:16	
41	Vivien Bonzi	Italy	1:14:55	
42	Nélie Clément	France	1:14:58	
43	Carolyn Nelson	Canada	1:15:13	
44	Katarína Pejpkova-Berešová	Slovakia	1:15:19	
45	Sarah Mccormack	Ireland	1:15:25	
46	Maria Magdalena Bosinceanu	Romania	1:15:39	
47	Laura Hampel	Germany	1:15:42	
48	Elena Adelina Panaet	Romania	1:16:16	
49	Céline Aebi	Switzerland	1:16:20	
50	Katarína Lovrantová	Slovakia	1:16:40	
51	Olena Koval	Ukraine	1:17:12	
52	Fernanda Erica Martinez	Argentina	1:17:37	
53	Teddy Simon Chekwemboi	Uganda	1:17:42	
54	Liliana Maria Dragomir	Romania	1:17:48	
55	Holly Page	United Kingdom	1:18:24	
56	Valentina Venerucci	San Marino	1:18:46	
57	Jessica Ronan	Australia	1:18:51	
58	Laura Domene	Spain	1:18:56	
59	Bernadette Schuster	Austria	1:19:05	
60	Blanca Maribel Llumiquinga Llumiquinga	Ecuador	1:19:54	
61	Sylwia Kapusta-Szydłak	Poland	1:20:03	
62	Maria Ordoñez	Spain	1:20:17	
63	Aine Gosling	Ireland	1:20:34	
64	Maria Jilote	Mexico	1:20:44	
65	Maia Flint	New Zealand	1:21:06	
66	Agate Armane	Latvia	1:21:15	
67	Lijan Van Niekerk	South Africa	1:21:27	
68	Victoire Cravatte	Belgium	1:21:54	
69	Varineja Drašler	Slovenia	1:22:15	
70	Andrea Jimenez	Chile	1:23:48	
71	Edel Monaghan	Ireland	1:24:11	
72	Gundega Heidingere	Latvia	1:24:27	
73	Sarah Flanagan	Ireland	1:24:37	
74	Judith Lopez	Mexico	1:24:46	
75	Andrea Peat	New Zealand	1:24:49	
76	Sabrina Edwards	New Zealand	1:25:22	
77	Dominika Zupančič Valant	Slovenia	1:25:32	
78	Kinga Zólyomi	Hungary	1:25:33	
79	Fatima Maria Villar	Paraguay	1:26:09	
80	Nadia Daniela Bernardis	Argentina	1:26:41	
81	Rachel Borg	Malta	1:27:41	
82	Paola Mabelis Martinez	Venezuela	1:27:58	
83	Carla Alejandra Pinos Santamaria	Ecuador	1:28:25	
84	Viviana Carolina Rios Cedillo	Ecuador	1:28:32	
85	Anissa Zsófia Weibl	Hungary	1:28:43	
86	Karley Rempel	Canada	1:28:52	
87	Tamara Véliz	Chile	1:28:59	
88	Amber Philp	Chile	1:29:15	
89	Eszter Ősi	Hungary	1:29:57	
90	Tetiana Davydenko	Ukraine	1:30:58	
91	Olha Havlytska	Ukraine	1:31:35	
92	Chiara Guiducci	San Marino	1:34:15	
93	Nwabisa Mjoli	South Africa	1:34:50	
94	Margherita Ceccoli	San Marino	1:52:18	
	Elena Stephenson	Australia	DNF	
	Paula Nazal	Chile	DNF	
	Giselle Slotboom	Netherlands	DNF	
	Sarah Douglas	New Zealand	DNF	
	Immaculate Chemutai	Uganda	DNF	
	Barbora Macurová	Czech Republic	DNS	
	Eli Anne Dvergsdal	Norway	DNS	
	Rosa Godoy	Argentina	DNS	
	Caroline Lambert	United Kingdom	DNS	
	Martina Bilora	Italy	DNS	
	Alice Gaggi	Italy	DNS	
	Flavia Stutz	Switzerland	DNS	

=== 2023 World Mountain Running Championships Up and downhill mountain race (Mountain Classic) Women's Team Standings ===
Rank	Country	Racers	Score
1st place, gold medalist(s)	Kenya	3 Joyce Muthoni; 4 Valentine Jepkoech Rutto; 7 Philaries Jeruto Kisang	14 pts
2nd place, silver medalist(s)	United Kingdom	10 Alice Goodall; 12 Scout Adkin; 21 Phillipa Williams	43 pts
3rd place, bronze medalist(s)	France	9 Cecile Jarousseau; 13 Christel Dewalle; 24 Elise Poncet	46 pts
4.	United States	1 Grayson Murphy; 25 Allie Mclaughlin; 35 Rachel Tomajczyk	61 pts
5.	Germany	5 Domenika Mayer; 19 Hanna Gröber; 37 Nina Voelckel	61 pts
6.	Italy	14 Francesca Ghelfi; 20 Elisa Sortini; 30 Sara Bottarelli	64 pts
7.	Czech Republic	8 Tereza Hrochová; 33 Hana Švestková Stružková; 36 Barbora Macurová	77 pts
8.	Uganda	11 Annet Chemengich Chelangat; 18 Rebecca Cheptegei; 53 Teddy Simon Chekwemboi	82 pts
9.	Canada	17 Anne-Marie Comeau; 26 Lindsay Webster; 43 Carolyn Nelson	86 pts
10.	Switzerland	15 Natalia Gemperle; 32 Rea Iseli; 49 Céline Aebi	96 pts
11.	Romania	6 Monica Madalina Florea; 46 Maria Magdalena Bosinceanu; 48 Elena Adelina Panaet	100 pts
12.	Spain	22 Onditz Iturbe; 29 Malen Osa; 58 Laura Domene	109 pts
13.	Slovakia	16 Silvia Schwaiger; 44 Katarína Pejpkova-Berešová; 50 Katarína Lovrantová	110 pts
14.	Argentina	38 Chiara Milena Mainetti; 52 Fernanda Erica Martinez; 80 Nadia Daniela Bernardis	170 pts
15.	Ireland	45 Sarah Mccormack; 63 Aine Gosling; 71 Edel Monaghan	179 pts
16.	Ecuador	40 Diana Landi Andrade; 60 Blanca Maribel Llumiquinga Llumiquinga; 83 Carla Alejandra Pinos Santamaria	183 pts
17.	South Africa	34 Bianca Tarboton; 67 Lijan Van Niekerk; 93 Nwabisa Mjoli	194 pts
18.	New Zealand	65 Maia Flint; 75 Andrea Peat; 76 Sabrina Edwards	216 pts
19.	Ukraine	51 Olena Koval; 90 Tetiana Davydenko; 91 Olha Havlytska	232 pts
20.	San Marino	56 Valentina Venerucci; 92 Chiara Guiducci; 94 Margherita Ceccoli	242 pts
21.	Chile	70 Andrea Jimenez; 87 Tamara Véliz; 88 Amber Philp	245 pts
22.	Hungary	78 Kinga Zólyomi; 85 Anissa Zsófia Weibl; 89 Eszter Ősi	252 pts
