= Rachel Johnson (disambiguation) =

Rachel Johnson (born 1965) is a British journalist, television presenter, and author.

Rachel Johnson may also refer to:

- Rachel Johnson (athlete) (born 1993), American track and field athlete
- Rachel Johnson (rugby union) (born 1991), American rugby union player
- Rachel Johnson, fictional character from Yogi Bear (2010)

== See also ==
- Rachel John (born 1980), British actress
