= 2023 European Athletics U23 Championships – Women's 10,000 metres =

Women's 10,000 metres at the 2023 European Athletics U23 Championships
- Venue: Leppävaara Stadium
- Location: Espoo, Finland
- Dates: 15 July
- Competitors: 27 from 17 nations
- Winning time: 33:16.45

Medalists
gold medal	Alice Goodall	Great Britain
silver medal	Sara Nestola	Italy
bronze medal	Aurora Bado	Italy

The women's 10,000 metres event at the 2023 European Athletics U23 Championships was held in Espoo, Finland, at the Leppävaara Stadium on 15 July.

== Records ==
Prior to the competition, the records were as follows:

European U23 record	Yasemin Can (TUR)	30:26.41	Rio de Janeiro, Brazil	12 August 2016
Championship U23 record	Alina Reh (GER)	31:39.34	Gävle, Sweden	12 July 2019

== Results ==
Rank	Name	Nationality	Time	Notes
1st place, gold medalist(s)	Alice Goodall	Great Britain	33:16.45	
2nd place, silver medalist(s)	Sara Nestola	Italy	33:17.51	
3rd place, bronze medalist(s)	Aurora Bado	Italy	34:12.75	
4	Maria Kassou	Greece	34:20.52	
5	Małgorzata Karpiuk	Poland	34:25.99	PB
6	Dafni Lavasia	Greece	34:36.71	
7	Clara Las Heras	Spain	34:53.68	
8	Greta Settino	Italy	35:01.46	
9	Hanna Bruckmayer	Germany	35:16.65	
10	Beata Niemyjska	Poland	35:22.74	
11	Anika Thompson	Ireland	35:26.91	
12	Jana Van Lent	Belgium	35:28.42	
13	Katrine Risvig	Denmark	35:32.17	
14	Julia-Anna Bell	Czech Republic	35:44.43	
15	Maria Nieves Campos	Spain	35:45.94	
16	Emma Heckel	Germany	35:49.44	
17	Mie Gam Nielsen	Denmark	35:59.89	
18	Kristine Meinert Rød	Norway	36:39.81	SB
19	Liza Šajn	Slovenia	37:04.29	
20	Ürküş Işık	Turkey	37:27.85	
21	Liina Winborn	Finland	37:43.19	
	Lisa Redlinger	Austria	DNF	
	Jasmina Nanette Stahl	Germany	DNF	
	Adele Norheim Henriksen	Norway	DNF	
	Madalina-Elena Sirbu	Romania	DNF	
	Rümeysa Coşkun	Turkey	DNF	
	Špela Gonza	Slovenia	DNF	
