= Grayson Murphy (runner) =

American mountain runner

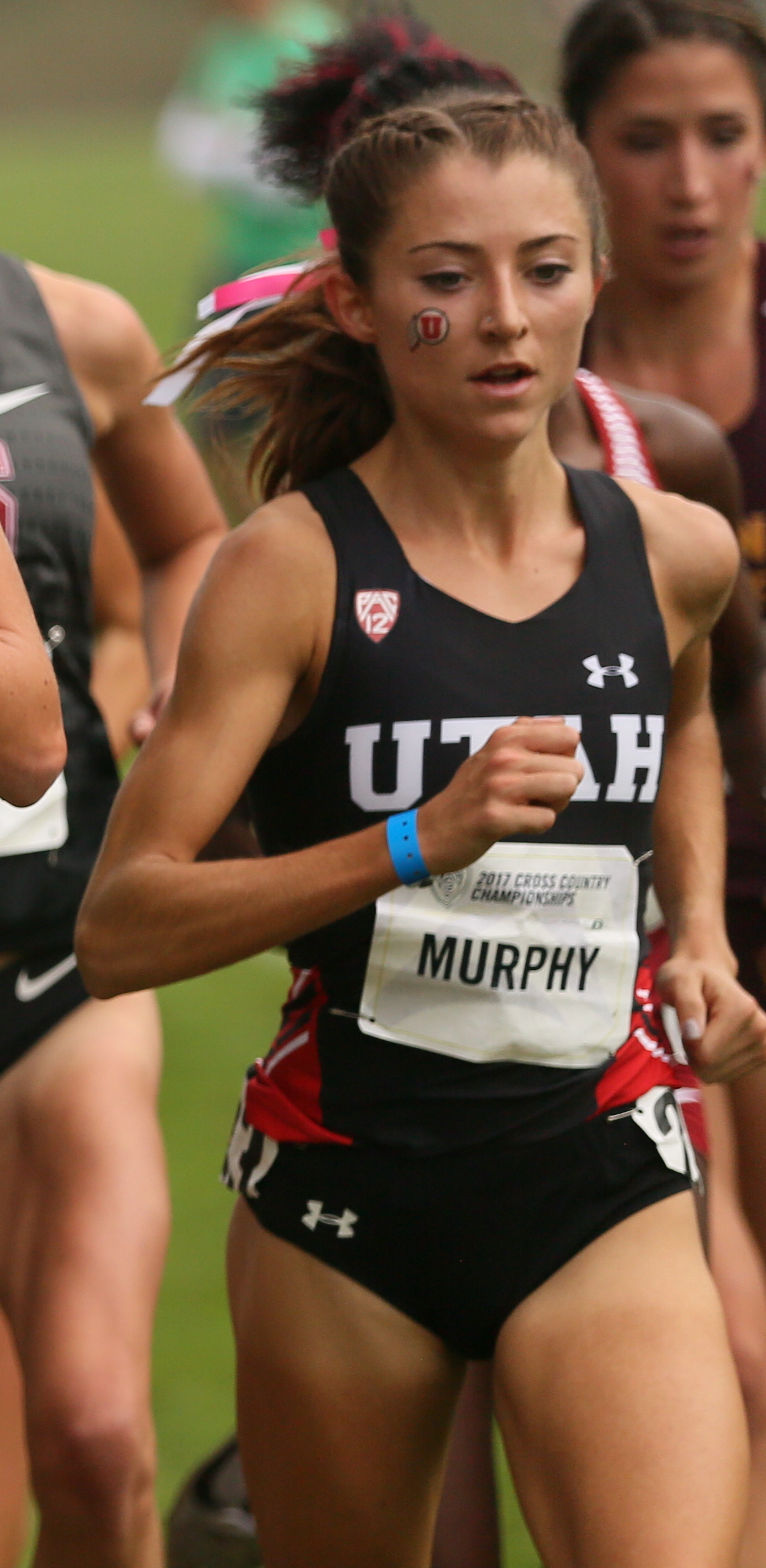
- Grayson Murphy in 2017

Personal information
- Full name: Grayson Murphy
- Nationality: American
- Born: June 28, 1995 (age 31)

Sport
- Country: United States
- Sport: Mountain running

Grayson Murphy (born June 28, 1995) is an American mountain, road, and track runner. Representing the United States, she is a two-time world champion in mountain running, as well as a five-time US national champion in mountain running and one-time US national champion in the vertical kilometer. At the University of Utah, Murphy competed in cross-country and track and field and was a five-time All-American. Murphy also has a strong presence on social media, where she is affectionately known as Racin' Grayson. She is also growing her entrepreneurial presence with her company, Wild Strides Paper Co.

== Early life and education ==
While a student at West High School (Utah), Murphy ran 1:02.53, placed 2nd in the 2013 Utah Region 2 400m semi-final. She instead was focused on soccer, and began her college athletic career as a member of the NCAA Division III soccer team at Sweet Briar College. After one year, she transferred to Santa Clara University and competed in track and cross-country for the first time, as a walk-on for the Santa Clara Broncos. She spent the remainder of her collegiate career with the Utah Utes, where she became an All-American in cross-country, indoor track, and outdoor track. Graduating summa cum laude, Murphy received her B.S. degree in Civil Engineering from the University of Utah in 2018, M.S. degree in Sustainability, and married Logan Diekmann on September 1 2024.

== Professional career ==
Murphy captured her first USA Track & Field national title at the 2019 USATF Mountain Running Championships. She repeated her title in 2021, 2023, and 2024 while also adding another victory in the Vertical Mountain Running division in 2023.

Internationally, Murphy won the 2019 World Mountain Running Championships in her debut at the event. She is also a two-time XTERRA trail run world champion.

Murphy also won the 2023 World Mountain Running Championships in the Classic Mountain discipline in Austria. At the same 2023 World Championships, Murphy also came home with a 3rd place podium finish in the Vertical discipline. Murphy was the only athlete competing at the 2023 World Championships to earn two medals.

On the track, Murphy finished in 6th place in the 3000m steeplechase, with a time of 9:25, at the 2020 (held in 2021) the US Olympic Trials. On the road, Murphy finished just off the podium, in 4th place, at the 2022 USATF Women's 6k Championships in Canton, Ohio. She also ran a personal best (1:10:34) at the Mill Town half marathon in 2023 to qualify for the 2024 US Olympic Marathon Trials. In cross-country, Murphy's best professional finish was in 2019 when she qualified for the NACAC Championships competing for Team USA. The NACAC cross-country championships were held in Trinidad and Tobago where Murphy finished 6th overall and 3rd for Team USA.

Murphy has been sponsored by Saucony from 2019 to 2026. In 2024 she was also sponsored by non-endemic sponsors Lagoon Sleep, Osprey, Ketone IQ, and COROS.

== Entrepreneurship ==
In late 2018, Murphy started selling her original Racin' Grayson Training Log + Planner product, a training log and daily planner combo intended to be used by athletes as a holistic, inspirational way to keep track of their training and life. In 2024, Murphy expanded her business to be Wild Strides Paper Co.- an online business specializing in selling stationery and paper goods for athletes.
