= Alice Goodall =

British athlete (born 2001)

Personal information
- Nationality: British
- Born: 3 October 2001 (age 24)

Sport
- Sport: Athletics
- Event(s): 10,000 metres, cross country
- Coached by: David Roche

Achievements and titles
- Personal best(s): 10,000m: 32:29.71 (London, 2023); 10km road:32:08 (Valencia, 2024)
Medal record
Women's Athletics
Representing Great Britain
European U23 Championships
Gold medal – first place	2023 Espoo	10,000 metres
European Cross Country Championships
Gold medal – first place	2022 Turin	U23 Team
Mountain running
World Championships
Silver medal – second place	2023 Innsbruck	Team uphill and downhill

Alice Goodall (born 3 October 2001) is a British track and field athlete who competes in long distance and cross country running. In 2023, she won gold at the European U23 Athletics Championships over 10,000 metres.

== Biography ==
In December 2022, she was a gold medalist in the U23 team event at the 2022 European Cross Country Championships in Turin, Italy.

An Edinburgh University athlete, Goodall was runner-up at the Scottish national cross country championships in Falkirk in March 2023. Goodall won the British University and Colleges (BUCS) title on her 10,000m track debut in a time of 33:10.01 in Loughborough in April 2023.

In June 2023, she was a silver medalist at the 2023 World Mountain and Trail Running Championships in the women’s team up and down race alongside Scout Adkin. In July 2023, she won gold at the 2023 European Athletics U23 Championships over 10,000 metres in Espoo, Finland.

In January 2024, Goodall ran a 10 km personal best of 32.08 on the road in Valencia. In February 2024, Goodall finished as runner-up in the 10 km race at the 2024 FISU Cross Country World Championships in Muscat, Oman. The following week she won the Scottish national cross country title in Falkirk. In March 2024, she finished third at the UK Inter-Counties Cross Country Championships at Wollaton Park. She was subsequently named in the senior British team for the 2024 World Athletics Cross Country Championships in Serbia, where she finished 46th.
