= Patrick Kipngeno =

Kenyan mountain runner

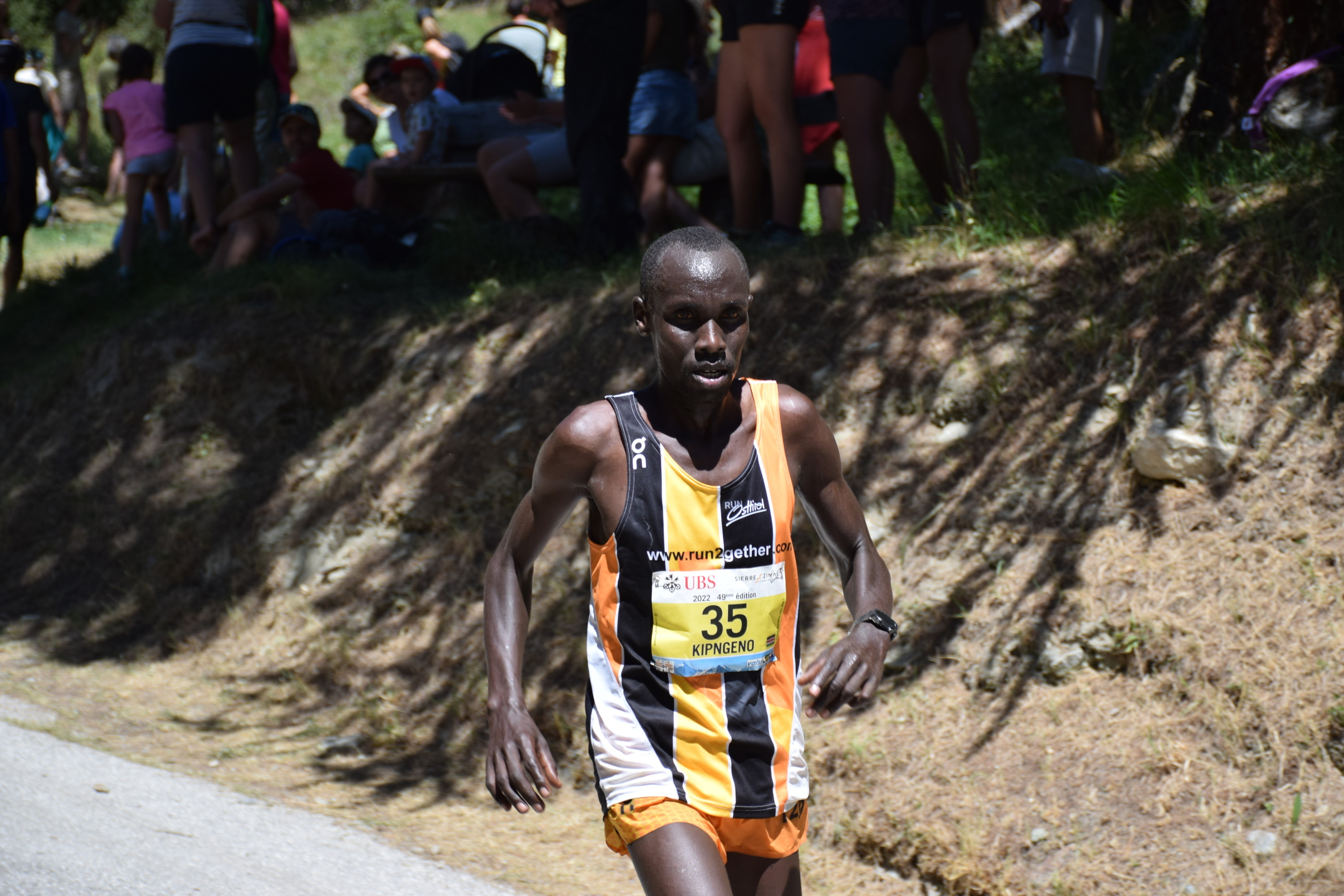
- Patrick Kipngeno at Sierre-Zinal 2022

Personal information
- Nationality: Kenyan
- Born: 18 June 1993 (age 33) Bomet County, Kenya

Sport
- Country: Kenya
- Sport: Mountain running, Sky running

Achievements and titles
- Personal best(s): Half marathon: 1:02:42 (2015, Nairobi) 10 km: 29:22 (2016, Kericho)

Patrick Kipngeno (born 18 June 1993, Bomet County, Kenya) is a Kenyan mountain runner. He primarily competes in mountain and trail races in Italy, France, Switzerland, and Austria.

As of 2022, Kipngeno is based in Austria. His current technical sponsor is On.

== Competition record ==
Competition record:

Position	Course	Distance	Date	Time
1st	Kenya Mountain Running Championships	10 km	22 November 2020	50:37
1st	Mount Kenya	13 km	26 February 2022	44:13
1st	Montemuro Vertical Run	9.5 km	19 June 2022	50:45
1st	Grossglockner Berglauf	13.4 km	10 July 2022	1:08:22
1st	Montée du Nid d'Aigle	19.5 km	16 July 2022	1:38:54
1st	Giir di Mont Uphill	9 km	30 July 2022	46:12
1st	Thyon-Dixence	16.35 km	7 August 2022	1:06:57
2nd	Sierre-Zinal	31 km	13 August 2022	2:29:35
1st	Nasego Vertical	4.2 km	3 September 2022	33:47
1st	Nasego Trophy	20.6 km	4 September 2022	1:30:46
1st	2022 World Mountain and Trail Running Championships - uphill	8.5 km	4 November 2022	46:51
2nd	2022 World Mountain and Trail Running Championships - up and down	11.2 km	6 November 2022	40:12
1st	2023 World Mountain and Trail Running Championships - uphill		10 June 2023	40:18
1st	2023 World Mountain and Trail Running Championships - team uphill		10 June 2023	11 pts
1st	2023 World Mountain and Trail Running Championships - team up & downhill		10 June 2023	11 pts
