= Emilia Brangefält =

Swedish trail runner (2002 – 2023)

Personal information
- National team: Sweden 2022–2023
- Born: May 10, 2002 Västerås
- Died: November 13, 2023 (aged 21)
- Years active: 2021–2023

Sport
- Sport: Trail running
- Club: Västerås Athletics
- Team: adidas Terrex

Achievements and titles
- World finals: 2022 World Mountain and Trail Running Championships, 40k, 3rd 2023 Trail and Mountain Running World Championships, 40k, 5th
- National finals: 2021 Swedish National Championships, 40k, 3rd 2022 Swedish National Championships, 40k, 1st
- Highest world ranking: 6
Medal record
Women's trail running
Representing Sweden
World Championships
Bronze medal – third place	2022 Chiang Mai	40km

Emilia Brangefält (10 May 2002 – 13 November 2023) was a Swedish marathon, trail and sky runner.

== Background ==
Brangefält grew up in Västerås, in Sweden's southern flatlands. As a child, Brangefält was active in orienteering and cross country skiing. In 2019, she began to concentrate on running, and joined the local team, Västerås Athletics.

=== 2021 ===
In 2021, she made her competitive debut at the Bålsta VIP Marathon. During the competition, she set the year's fastest time in the world for women under 20 in the marathon. The following week, she graduated from Rudbeckianska high school and received the Sports Shield, one of Sweden's top athletics honors

After graduation, she moved to Uppsala. Later that year, she earned a bronze medal in the Swedish national championships in the 45 km trail competition.

=== 2022 ===
In 2022, she won the Swedish National Championships in the 40km short trail and earned a place on the Swedish national team. She was the youngest member of the Swedish team, at 20 years old. Competing for Sweden, she received a bronze medal at the inaugural World Mountain & Trail Running Championships in Chiang Mai, Thailand. It was her first international competition.

=== 2023 ===
In 2023, she won the Sandnes Ultratrail and placed second in the Transvulcania Ultramarathon. She additionally placed fourth in the Swedish National Cup ski mountaineering competition. She would go on to place fifth in the World Mountain and Trail Running Championships in Innsbruck.

Later that year, Brangefält fell ill with a condition that caused her heartbeat to increase unexpectedly. Her illness prevented her from training.

Brangefält died on 13 November 2023 by suicide.

== Results ==
Year	Event	Distance	Placing	Competitors	Reference
2021	Salming Idre Mountain Marathon - 45 km - Reindeer path	45 km 1400 M+	4	194	
2021	Swedish Nationals Ultratrail - 45km	45 km	3	14	
2022	Genarps IF Trail - GIFT 40K - TRAIL SM 2022	41 km 860 M+	1	27	
2022	Mountain marathon week Årefjällen - Peak Performance Vertical K		3	64	
2022	Mountain marathon week Årefjällen - 45K	45 km 1900 M+	2	112	
2022	World Mountain & Trail Running Championship - Short Trail 40km	38 km 2425 M+	3	75	
2023	Sandnes Ultratrail - 23 K	22 km 1400 M+	1	41	
2023	Swedish National Cup - Bjursås Skimo Race		4	8	
2023	Transvulcania Ultramarathon La Palma Island - Volcanoes 48K	48 km 2580 M+	2	87	
2023	World Mountain and Trail Running Championships Innsbruck-Stubai - Trail Short	44.2 km 3250 M+	5	125	
