= Rebecca Flaherty (runner) =

British athlete (born 2005)

- Flaherty in 2026

Personal information
- Born: 28 December 2005 (age 20)

Sport
- Sport: Athletics
- Events: Middle-distance, Long-distance, Cross country

Rebecca Flaherty (born 28 December 2005) is a British cross country runner. She won the U20 race at the 2023 World Mountain and Trail Running Championships. She represented Great Britain at the 2025 European Cross Country Championships. She won the junior race at the 2026 English National Cross Country Championships.

== Biography ==
Flaherty is from Menston, West Yorkshire and attended Bradford Grammar School, where she served as Head Girl. She later studied biochemistry at the University of Oxford, where she also participated as a member of Oxford University Cross Country Club.

In November 2022 in Thailand, she claimed the silver medal behind compatriot Jess Bailey in the junior up and down race at the delayed 2021 World Mountain and Trail Running Championships, winning team gold. In June 2023, she won the individual gold medal and led Great Britain and Northern Ireland to team gold at the 2023 World Mountain and Trail Running Championships. She also competed for Great Britain in the under-20 race at the 2023 World Athletics Cross Country Championships in Bathurst, Australia as a 17 year-old.

Running alongside her mother, Sarah Flaherty, a Head of Year 12 and Teacher of Chemistry at Bradford Grammar School, the pair set a Guinness World Record at the Great North Run in November 2025, becoming the fastest mother–daughter duo ever to complete a half marathon.

Flaherty represented Great Britain in the under-23 race at the 2025 European Cross Country Championships in Lagoa, Portugal in December 2025. She won the under-20 women’s title at the 2026 English National Cross Country Championships in Sedgefield in February 2026. In May, she placed second over 5000 metres at the 2026 British Universities and Colleges Sport (BUCS) Outdoor Championships. On 8 November, Flaherty placed third the Cardiff Cross Challenge, a silver label race on the World Athletics Cross Country Tour.
