= Andreu Blanes =

Spanish orienteering competitor and long-distance runner

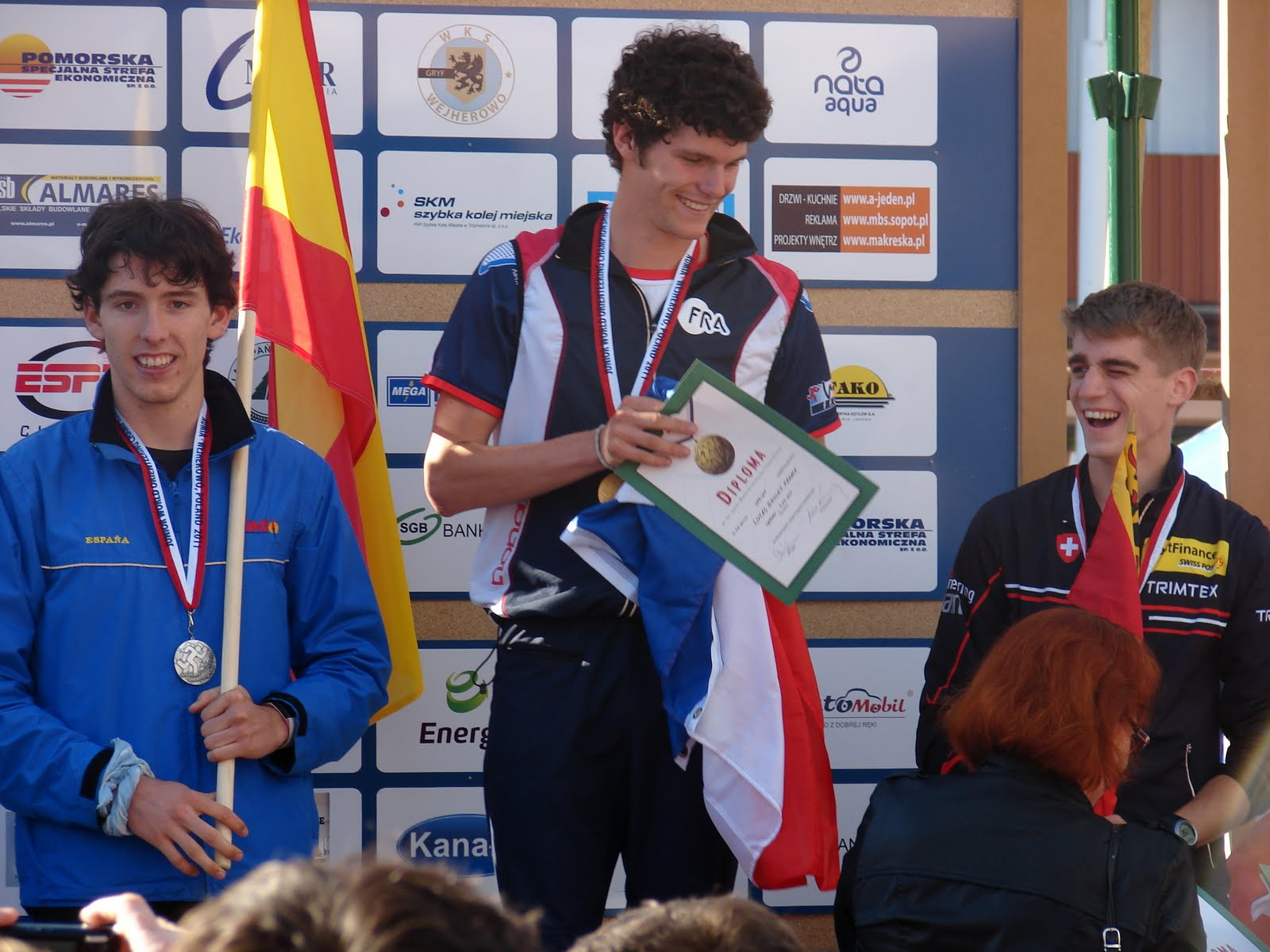
- Sprint medalists at the 2011 Junior World Championships (Blanes with silver medal)

Personal information
- Full name: Andreu Blanes Reig
- Born: 14 October 1991 (age 34) Onil, Spain

Sport
- Sport: Orienteering; Long-distance running
- Club: Onil (ESP); Madrid (ESP); Södertälje (SWE)
Medal record
Men's orienteering
Representing Spain
Junior World Championships
| Silver medal – second place | 2011 Wejerowo | Sprint |

Andreu Blanes Reig (born 14 October 1991) is a Spanish orienteering competitor and long-distance runner. He was born in Onil. He won a silver medal in sprint at the 2011 Junior World Orienteering Championships, and placed fourth in the relay. He competed at the 2018 World Orienteering Championships in Latvia, where he placed seventh in the sprint final. He has competed in the 2011, 2012, 2013, 2014, 2015, 2016, 2017 and 2018 World Orienteering Championships. His best World Championship result before 2018 was a seventh place in the sprint at the 2015 World Orienteering Championships.

In 2022, he won a silver medal in the team up and downhill race at the World Mountain and Trail Running Championships. He competed in the senior race at the 2023 World Athletics Cross Country Championships, where he finished 55th.

== Personal bests ==
Outdoor

- 1500 m: 3:45.56 (Barcelona 2021)
- 3000 m: 8:07.72 (Castellón 2020)
- 2000 m steeplechase: 5:41.35 (Barcelona 2020)
- 3000 m steeplechase: 8:33.22 (Castellón 2020)
- 5000 m: 14:25.16 (Onil 2020)
- 10,000 m: 30:43.12 (Andújar 2018)
- 10K (road): 27:47 (Valencia 2026)
- Half marathon: 1:02:40 (Valencia 2021)
- Marathon: 2:09:18 (Valencia 2024)

Indoor

- 1500 m: 3:48.77 (Madrid 2019)
- 3000 m: 7:52.40 (Valencia 2021)

== International Athletics Competitions, Selected Results ==
| Year | Competition | Venue | Position | Event | Notes |
Representing Spain
| 2022 | World Mountain and Trail Running Championships | Chiang Mai, Thailand | 6th | Up & Downhill (11.2 km) | 41:31 |
| 2022 | Sierre-Zinal | Valais, Switzerland | 1st | | 2:29:19 |
| 2023 | World Cross Country Championships | Bathurst, Australia | 55th | 10 km cross | 32:38 |
| 2023 | World Mountain and Trail Running Championships | Innsbruck, Austria | 10th | Up & Downhill (10.7 km) | 59:54 |
