= Elena Adelina Panaet =

Romanian long-distance runner

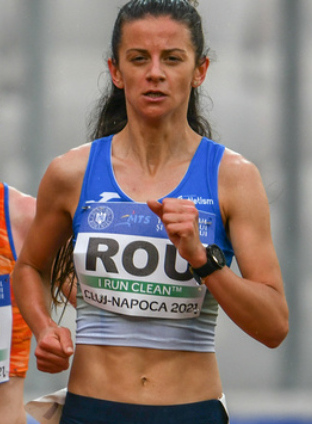

Personal information
- Born: 5 June 1993 (age 33)

Sport
- Country: Romania
- Sport: Long-distance running

Elena Adelina Panaet (born 5 June 1993) is a Romanian long-distance and steeplechase runner. In 2020, she competed in the women's half marathon at the 2020 World Athletics Half Marathon Championships held in Gdynia, Poland.
