= Liliana Maria Dragomir =

Romanian long-distance runner

Personal information
- Nationality: Romanian
- Born: 18 June 1990 (age 36)

Sport
- Sport: Long-distance running
- Event: Marathon

Liliana Maria Dragomir (born 18 June 1990) is a Romanian long-distance runner. She competed in the women's marathon at the 2017 World Championships in Athletics. In 2020, she competed in the women's race at the 2020 World Athletics Half Marathon Championships held in Gdynia, Poland.
