= Scout Adkin =

Scottish long-distance runner (born 1993)

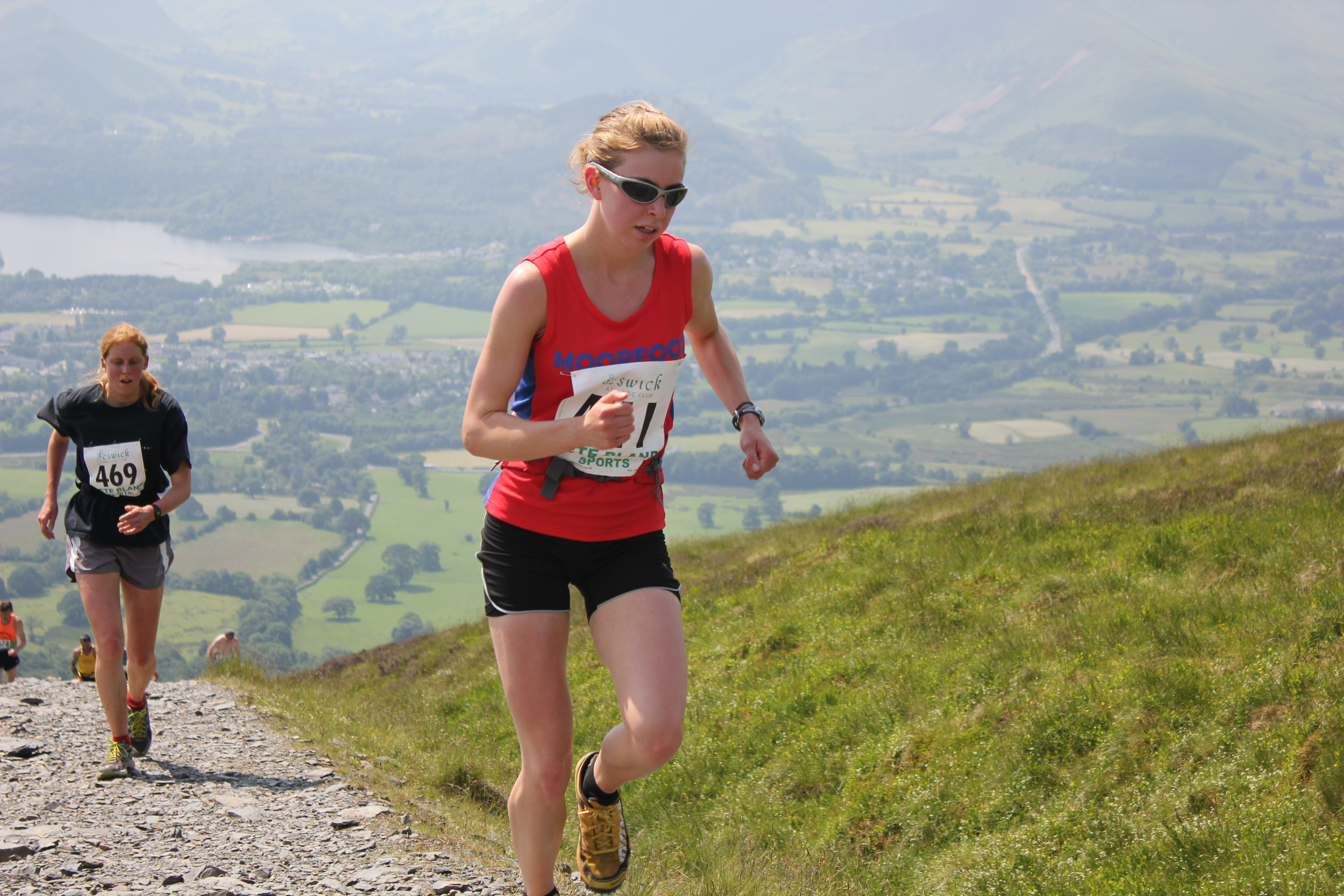
- Adkin in 2013

Personal information
- Nationality: British (Scottish)
- Born: 16 August 1993 (age 33)

Sport
- Sport: Athletics
- Event: Long-distance running
Medal record
Women's athletics
Representing Great Britain
Mountain running
World Championships
| Bronze medal – third place | 2023 Innsbruck | Team Uphill |
| Silver medal – second place | 2023 Innsbruck | Team Up and Down |
| Silver medal – second place | 2021 Chiang Mai | Team Uphill |
| Silver medal – second place | 2021 Chiang Mai | Team Up and Down |
European Championships
| Gold medal – first place | 2026 Kamnik | Team Uphill |
| Bronze medal – third place | 2026 Kamnik | Team Up and Down |
| Silver medal – second place | 2024 Annecy | Uphill |
| Silver medal – second place | 2024 Annecy | Team Uphill |
| Gold medal – first place | 2024 Annecy | Team Up and Down |
| Gold medal – first place | 2022 La Palma | Team Uphill |
| Bronze medal – third place | 2022 La Palma | Up and Down |
| Bronze medal – third place | 2022 La Palma | Team Up and Down |
WMRA World Cup
| First place | 2025 | Overall Series |
| First place | 2024 | Overall Series |
| Second place | 2023 | Overall Series |

Scout Adkin (born 16 August 1993) is a British long-distance and mountain runner from Scotland. She won the Mountain Running World Cup in 2024 and 2025 and was an individual and team medalist at the 2023 World Mountain and Trail Running Championships.

== Biography ==
From Peebles in Scotland, Adkin took part in competitive swimming as a youngster before focusing on running. She is from a sporting family, her brother Jacob Adkin also competes as a runner and was 2019 European Mountain Running champion. She ran a hill race for first time in 2008 as a fifteen year-old, and was UK junior champion in 2011 going on to compete at the 2011 European Mountain Running Championships. She studied at Robert Gordon University in Aberdeen for a degree in physiotherapy after which she was based herself in the Lake District, combining running with physio work.

Adkin won the silver medal at the World Mountain Running Association (WMRA) Nations Cup in Chiavenna, Italy, in October 2021. She made her her senior debut for Great Britain team at the inaugural European Off-Road Running Championships in Spain in 2022, winning gold in the team event, the first Brit to finish individually in fourth overall, in the women's uphill race. She also won the individual bronze medal in the uphill and downhill mountain running event at the championships.

Adkin was third at the World Long Distance Mountain Running Championships in March 2023 and won a silver medal in the team uphill race and was a bronze medalist in the team up and downhill race at the 2023 World Mountain and Trail Running Championships. She won the Scottish cross country national title and was nominated for Scottish athlete of the year in 2023. That year, Adkin won the Montemuro Vertical Run in Portugal, and was also the 2023 Sky Gran Canaria Vertical winner.

Adkin won the silver medal in the women's uphill race in Annecy at the 2024 European Off-Road Running Championships, where her brother also won the silver medal in the men's race. Adkin won the 2024 Mountain Running World Cup, her performances including a win at the Lagunc KM Verticale in Italy.

Adkin retained her title at the 2025 Mountain Running World Cup despite missing the final races with injury, having achieved victories in individual events throughout the season from the first event in Bukovina in May at the Zmeu X-Fest Mountain Race, and in Poland, at the Tatra Fest. She placed fifteenth in the uphill race at the 2025 World Mountain Championships.
