= Rachel Tomajczyk =

American track and field athlete

Personal information
- Born: Rachel Johnson; April 30, 1993 (age 33) Dallas, Texas
- Height: 5 ft 5 in (165 cm)

Sport
- Country: United States
- Event(s): 3000 m, 3000m Steeplechase, 5000 m, Trail running
- College team: Baylor University
- Team: Merrell

Achievements and titles
- Personal best(s): 3000 m Steeplechase: 9:41.56; 5000 meters: 15:39.42
Medal record
Women's athletics
Representing the United States
NACAC U23
Gold medal – first place	Kamloops	3000 m SteeplechaseCR

Rachel Tomajczyk (née Johnson; born April 30, 1993) is an American distance running athlete.

== High school ==
Rachel ran for the Plano Senior High School cross country and track team in Plano, Texas. She trained with the Dallas Metroplex Striders club team. Rachel won the 2010 Nike Cross Nationals Cross Country meet. She is a two-time Foot Locker Cross Country Championships finalist, finishing as runner-up in 2010 and 11th overall in 2009. Rachel claimed the University Interscholastic League Texas Class 5A state championships individual state cross country title in 2010 after earning a runner-up finish in 2009. Rachel was named 2010 Gatorade Player of the Year awards Texas Cross Country Runner. Rachel earned Texas 5A track state titles in 1600 meters and 3200 meters. She finished second at the Texas state meet in 1600 meters in 2009. Rachel had high school personal bests of 4:53.75 at 1600 meters and 17:10 at 5000 meters.

== NCAA College ==
Rachel was a six time NCAA Division I All-American, and a fourteen time All- Big 12 Conference while running as an athlete at Baylor University. While competing at Baylor, she set Baylor track records for the 3 km indoor, 5 km indoor, 3 km steeplechase outdoor, 5 km outdoor, and the 1 km outdoor. She was a silver medalist at the 2015 NCAA Indoor Championships in the 5,000 meters.

== After college ==
After graduation from Baylor University, Rachel Johnson joined ASICS Furman Elite, an elite post-collegiate distance program under Coach Robert Gary based out of Greenville, South Carolina, in September 2016. In September 2018, she moved to Flagstaff, Arizona, where Ryan Hall began coaching her. In July 2019, Rachel moved to Lynchburg, Virginia, and began to coach distance athletes at Liberty University. She married Drew Tomajczyk in June 2021 and they currently live in Williams, Arizona. She is currently sponsored by Merrell.

=== NACAC Track and Field Championships ===
Year	Competition	Venue	Position	Event	Notes
2014	NACAC U-23 Track and Field Championships	Kamloops, BC	1st	3000 meter steeplechase	9:46.79

=== USA National Championships ===
Mountain

Year	Competition	Venue	Position
2021	USA Mountain Championship	Mt. Hood, Oregon	2nd
2022	USA Mountain Classic Championship	Wilmington, New York	2nd
2022	USA Mountain Vertical Championship	Lincoln, New Hampshire	2nd

Trail

Year	Competition	Venue	Position
2021	USA Half Marathon Trail Championship	Cable, Wisconsin	1st
2023	XTERRA Trail Half Marathon World Championship	Carrabassett Valley, Maine	1st

==== Road ====
Year	Competition	Venue	Position	Event	Notes
2015	USA 5 km Road Championship	Providence, Rhode Island	18th	5 km	16:54
2015	USA 10 km Road Championship	Boston, Massachusetts	14th	10 km	33:34
2016	USA 5 km Road Championship	New York, New York	7th	5 km	16:34
2017	USA 5 km Road Championship	New York, New York	14th	5 km	16:23
2018	USA 5 km Road Championship	New York, New York	14th	5 km	16:22

==== Track and Field ====
Year	Competition	Venue	Position	Event	Notes
2014	USA Outdoor Track and Field Championship	Sacramento, California	5th	3000 m steeplechase	9:41.56
2015	USA Outdoor Track and Field Championship	Eugene, Oregon	9th	3000 m steeplechase	9:53.34
