= List of people from Christchurch =

Famous and well known people associated with Christchurch

This is a list of notable people who were either born in Christchurch, New Zealand, or who spent a significant part of their lives living in the region.

== A ==
- Hugh Acland (1874–1956), surgeon
- Jim Anderton (1938–2018), Labour politician and deputy prime minister (1999–2002)
- Harry Ayres (1912–1987), mountaineer, guide, and gardener
- Ernest Andrews (1873–1961), longstanding mayor of Christchurch
- Marcus Armstrong (born 2000), motor racing driver
- Vajin Armstrong (born 1980), ultra-distance runner

== B ==
- Petra Bagust, (born 1972), Television news presenter
- Simon Barnett (born 1967), public figure and co-host of morning radio show
- Blanche Baughan (1870–1958), poet, writer and penal reformer
- Peter Beaven (1925–2012), architect and heritage lobbyist
- Ursula Bethell (1874–1945), poet and social activist
- John Blumsky (1928–2013), journalist and broadcaster
- Shane Bond (born 1975), player and coach of the national cricket team
- John Britten (1950–1995) New Zealand mechanical engineer who designed a world-record-setting motorcycle with innovative features and materials
- Kathleen Browne (1905–2007), artist
- Gerry Brownlee (born 1956), National Party MP for Ilam electorate
- Vicki Buck (born 1955/56), first female mayor of Christchurch and activist

== C ==
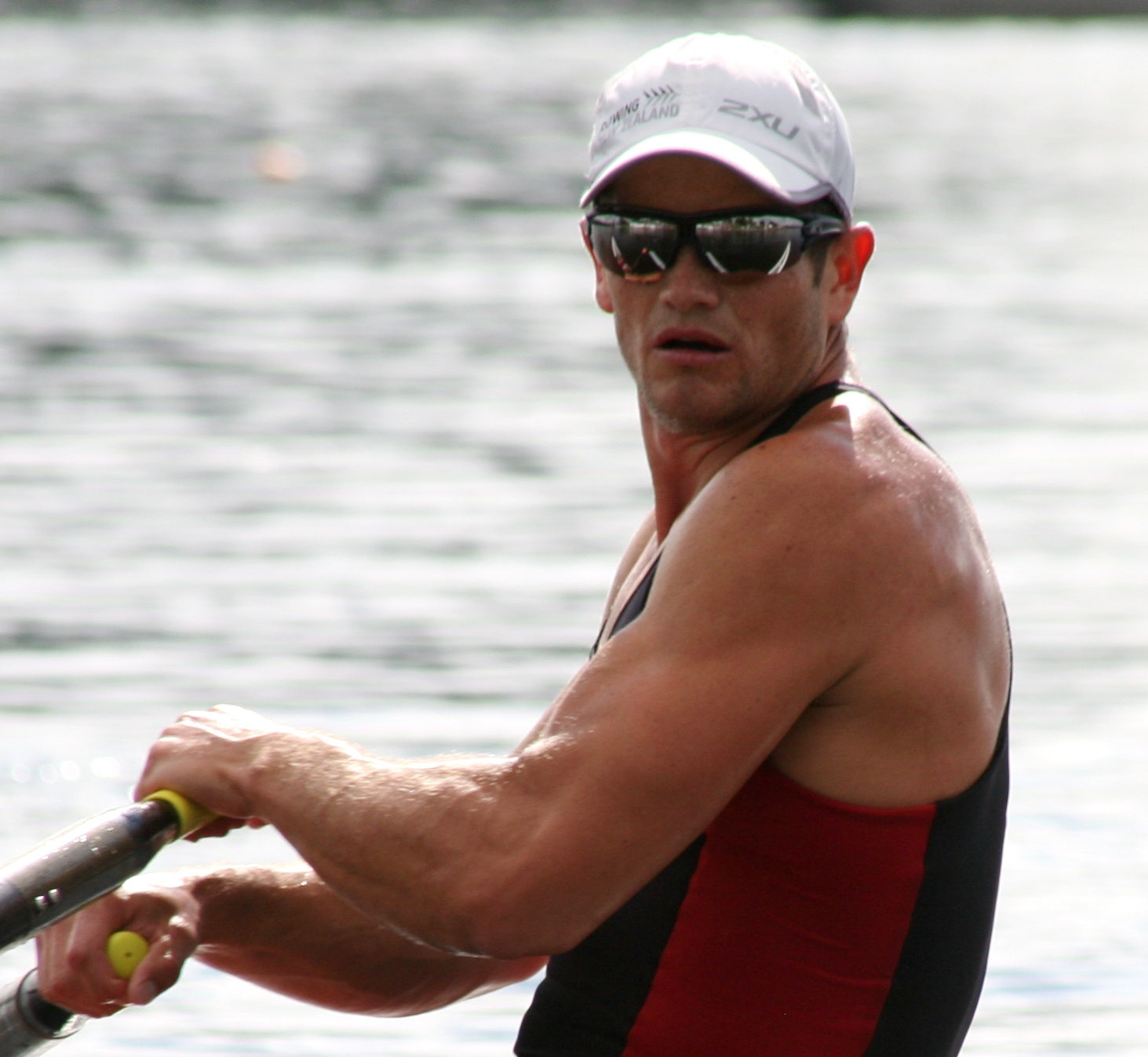
Nathan Cohen

- Dolce Ann Cabot (1862–1943), journalist, newspaper editor, feminist and teacher
- Tonie Carroll (born 1976), rugby league player, played for both New Zealand and Australia
- Kahurangi Carter (born 1983 or 1984), politician
- Dan Carter (born 1982), plays rugby for Canterbury Crusaders and the All Blacks, highest test-match point scorer
- Nathan Cohen (born 1986), world and Olympic champion rower
- Brendan Cole (born 1976), ballroom dancer and television personality
- Ray Columbus (1942–2016), singer-songwriter of Ray Columbus & the Invaders
- John Cracroft Wilson ("Nabob" Wilson, 1808–1881), farmer of Cashmere and independent parliamentarian

== D ==
- Lianne Dalziel (born 1960), mayor of Christchurch, former Labour Party MP for Christchurch Central and Christchurch East electorates
- John Deans (1820–1854), pioneer farmer
- Sharon Shobha Devi Lingham (1956–2010), broadcaster
- David de Lautour (born 1982), actor and musician
- Christopher Doig (1948–2011), opera singer
- Axel Downard-Wilke (born 1966), transport planner and Wikipedian
- Brooke Duff (born 1991), Christchurch-born singer/songwriter
- Andrew Duncan (1834–1880), mayor of Christchurch and provincial councillor

== E ==
- Lincoln Arthur Winstone Efford (1907–1962), pacifist, social reformer and adult educationalist

== F ==
- Eileen Fairbairn (1893–1981), geographer, climber, teacher
- Daniel Faitaua (born c.1976), Television news reporter, currently working for TVNZ

== G ==
- Jon Gadsby (1953–2015), actor and comedian
- James Gapes (1822–1899), mayor of Christchurch and flautist
- Jo Giles (1950–2011), former sports representative and television personality
- A. K. Grant (1941–2000), writer, historian and humorist
- Charles Gray (1853–1918), independent parliamentarian and mayor of Christchurch
- Jeffrey Grice (born 1954), classical pianist
- John Grimes (1842–1915), first Roman Catholic bishop of Christchurch
- Jason Gunn (born 1968), broadcaster and entertainer

== H ==
- Sir Richard Hadlee (born 1951), international cricketer
- John Hall (1824–1907), independent politician, 12th prime minister of New Zealand and mayor of Christchurch
- Sir William Hamilton, (1899–1978) Fairlie-born inventor of the jetboat, whose company, Hamilton Jet, was based in Christchurch from 1948
- Joel Hayward (born 1964), academic, writer and poet
- Graham Henry (born 1946), rugby union coach, head coach of the All Blacks
- Tom Hern (born 1984), actor
- Hera Hjartardóttir (born 1983), Iceland-born singer/songwriter
- Fred Hobbs (1841–1920), mayor of Christchurch and drainage activist
- M. H. Holcroft (1902–1993), essayist and novelist

== J ==
- Barry Jones (1941–2016), ninth Roman Catholic bishop of Christchurch
- Churchill Julius (1847–1938), second Anglican bishop of Christchurch and first archbishop of New Zealand

== K ==
- Phil Keoghan (born 1967), television host of The Amazing Race
- John Key, (born 1961), former National Party MP and prime minister
- Nathan King singer/songwriter with the rock band Zed
- John Kennard, rally co-driver

== L ==
- Ladi6 (born 1982) Christchurch-born singer/songwriter
- Charles Luney (1905–2006), famous New Zealand builder and company director
- Christopher Luxon, (born 1970), National Party MP and prime minister (2023–present)

== M ==
- Justice Peter Mahon QC, (1923–1986), the New Zealand High Court judge who led the Commission of Inquiry into the 1979 crash of Air New Zealand Flight 901 into Mount Erebus.
- Margaret Mahy (1936–2012), writer for children and young adults
- George Manning (1887–1976), politician and mayor of Christchurch
- Ngaio Marsh (1895–1982), crime writer and theatre director
- Richie McCaw (born 1980), captain of the New Zealand rugby team, the All Blacks
- Gary McCormick (born 1951), poet, radio and television personality, and co-host of morning radio show
- Scott McLaughlin (born 1993), 2x V8 Supercars Champion, Current NTT IndyCar Series driver
- David McPhail, (1945–2021), actor and comedian
- Bernice Mene (born 1975), former Silver Ferns netball captain
- Max Merritt (born 1941), singer-songwriter and guitarist
- Juliet Mitchell (born 1940), professor and psychoanalyst
- Anika Moa (born 1980), singer-songwriter
- Elizabeth Moody (1939–2010), actor and director
- Garry Moore (born 1951), 44th mayor of Christchurch
- Stacey Morrison (born c.1974), television and radio host
- Benjamin Mountfort (1825–1898), dominant local architect
- Charles Mountfort (1854–1941), surveyor
- Anjali Mulari (born 1993), Christchurch-born international ice and inline hockey player

== O ==
- John Ollivier (1812–1893), politician and auctioneer
- Denis O'Rourke (born 1946) politician and former City councillor
- Daisy Osborn (1888–1957), artist

== P ==
- Frederick Page (1905–1983), music professor, pianist and critic
- Robert Page (1897–1957), pacifist and industrial chemist
- Bob Parker (born 1953), mayor of Christchurch during the 2011 Christchurch earthquakes
- Sophie Pascoe (born 1993), Paralympic champion awarded nine gold medals
- Mike Pero (born 1960), businessman and entrepreneur

== R ==
- Bic Runga (born 1976), singer-songwriter
- Boh Runga (born 1969/1970), lead singer and guitarist in New Zealand rock band Stellar
- Ernest Rutherford (1871–1937), Nobel Prize winning physicist, completed a BA, BSc and MA at the then Canterbury College

== S ==
- Robertson Stewart (1913–2007), industrialist and exporter
- Ben Stokes (born 1991), English cricketer

== T ==
- Lilia Tarawa, former member of Gloriavale Christian Community, author, speaker, entrepreneur
- Pana Hema Taylor (born 1989), television actor
- Gary Thain (1948–1975), rock bassist (Keef Hartley Band, Uriah Heep)
- Mildred Annie Trent (1883–1942), cook, tearooms manager and community worker

== W ==
- Miho Wada, jazz flautist and founder of Miho's Jazz Orchestra
- Nicky Wagner (born 1953), National Party MP for Christchurch Central and educationist
- R. C. S. Walters (1888–1980), civil engineer, hydrogeologist
- Deane Waretini (born 1946), singer-songwriter
- Hayley Westenra (born 1987), classical singer, songwriter and UNICEF ambassador
- Elsie Maud White (1889–1978), miniaturist
- Brooke Williams (born 1984), television actress
- Colin Wilson (born 1949), comic book artist
- William Wilson ("Cabbage" Wilson, 1819–1897), first mayor of Christchurch
- Wizard of New Zealand (born 1932), public speaker, comedian and iconic local figure
- Megan Woods (born 1973), Labour Party MP for Wigram electorate
