= Francesca Canepa =

Italian snowboarder

Personal information
- Nationality: Italian
- Born: 14 September 1971 (age 54) Courmayeur

Sport
- Country: Italy
- Sport: Snowboarding; Skyrunning; Trail running
Medal record
Skyrunning
Skyrunner World Series
Bronze medal – third place	Season 2017	Sky Ultra

Francesca Canepa (born 14 September 1971) is a former Italian female snowboarder, in 2010 she became sky runner and trail runner at the age of 40.

== Biography ==
In skyrunning she achieved her best results at international level, winning three Skyrunner World Series races and breaking the final rankings of the 2017 Ultra category.

In snowboarding her best international result in FIS Snowboard World Cup was in the season 1997-98 with 8th place in parallel slalom of Sestrieres.

== Selected results ==
=== Trail running/skyrunning ===
2012

- (gold) Lavaredo Ultra Trail
- (gold) Tor des Géants
- (silver) Ultra-Trail du Mont-Blanc

2013

- (gold) Ronda dels Cims (2013 Skyrunner World Series race)
- (gold) Eiger Ultra Trail
- (gold) Tor des Géants

2014

- (gold) Hong Kong 100
- (gold) Eiger Ultra Trail
- (silver) Transgrancanaria
- (silver) Lavaredo Ultra Trail

2015

- (gold) 100 Miles of Istria
- (gold) Cappadocia Ultra Trail
- (bronze) Eiger Ultra Trail

2016

- (gold) 100 Miles of Istria
- (gold) Mozart 100

2017

- (gold) 100 Miles of Istria
- (gold) Scenic Trail (2017 Skyrunner World Series race)
- (gold) Devil’s Ridge Ultra (2017 Skyrunner World Series race)
- (gold) Ultra des COURSIERES

2018

- (gold) Ultra-Trail du Mont-Blanc

== See also ==
- List of multi-sport athletes
