= Tatry =

Tatry may refer to:

- Tatra Mountains, or Tatry, on the border between Slovakia and Poland
- 1989 Tatry, a carbonaceous Vestian asteroid and tumbling slow rotator
- Tatry Airport, an airport in the Slovak ski resort town of Poprad
- Tatry Running Tour, a stage structured trail running competition
