= Tor des Géants =

Endurance trail race

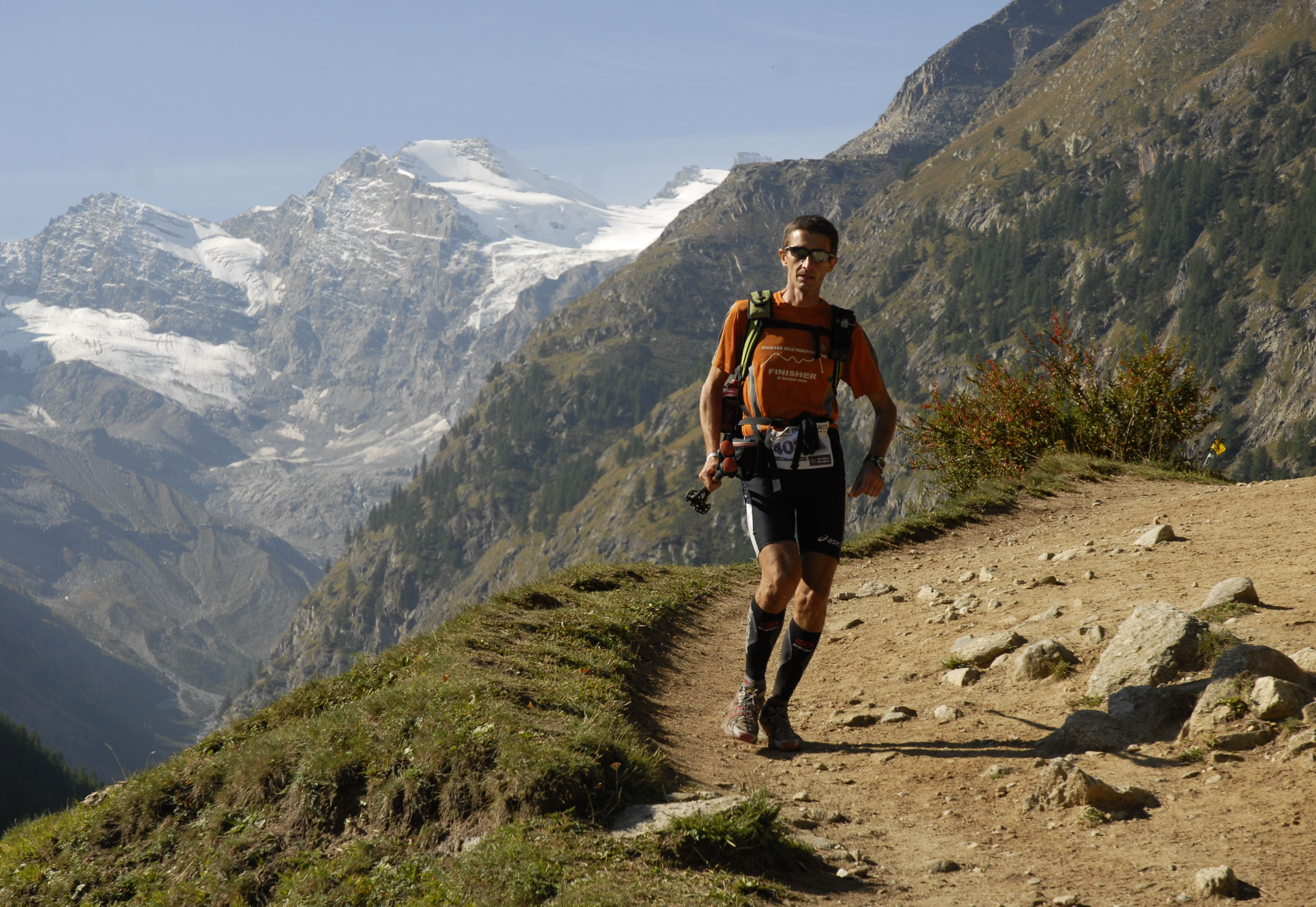
- Event: Race
- Sport: Trail running
- Nation: Italy
- Region: Aosta Valley
- Participant: 1100 from all over the world (2026)
- Date: yearly, mid-September
- Length: about 330km (205mi)
- Men's Record: Zhao Jiaju, 65h55' (2026)
- Women's Record: Katharina Hartmuth, 67h10' (2026)
- Site: Official site

Tor des Géants (meaning Tour of Giants in Valdôtain, the dialect of Arpitan spoken in Aosta Valley) is an endurance trail race of the XXL category which takes place in Aosta Valley, Italy, in September.

== Description ==
The start and the finish are in Courmayeur. The total length of the race is 330 km (205 mi) which must be completed in less than 150 hours. There are 43 refreshment points at which the runners can eat, sleep, and, if needed, obtain medical care. There are also 6 life bases, which are bigger than refreshment points. They are placed about every 50 km (31 mi). Because of its difficulty, many athletes do not complete the race. The completion rate is about 60%. Around 2000 volunteers are used to organize the race. Weather can be a challenge, given the large elevation changes over the course and competitors can encounter sun, rain, wind, and even snow. The number of participants is limited because of the complexity of managing people over the 330 km trek. For the 2015 edition there were 2291 pre-registrations. The 2016 race was conducted under ITRA regulations.

The inaugural edition was in 2010.

The 2012 edition was interrupted on the fourth night and stopped on the fifth day at Saint-Rhémy-en-Bosses (303 km). About 70 runners completed the whole course.

The 2013 edition was marked by the death of the Chinese runner, Yang Yuan. He fell and hit his head on rocks during the rainy first night of the race. The site of the accident has a cairn inscribed with a poem written by Yang Yuan.

The 2015 edition was interrupted on the third night due to severe weather and stopped on the fourth night, because Col Malatra got covered by ice. Only six runners completed the race.

In 2016, local authorities organized a competing race 4K VDA. The suspected reasons were concerns for runners' safety and the costs. The race started and ended in Cogne and went clockwise (unlike Tor).

The 2017 edition introduced a GPS tracking system. The Tor des Géants website, shows live data for each athlete including time of pass at specific points along the path, overall ranking, median speed, distance and elevation gain traveled. There is also a map that shows the athletes live position.

The 2026 edition saw the first Asian and Chinese man, Zhao Jiaju, taking the crown in the event's 16-year history, with a new course record. On the women's side, Katharina Hartmuth became the first woman to ever land on the overall podium with her third-place overall finish, winning the women race while shortening her own previous course record from 2024 by almost exactly 12 hours.

== Path ==
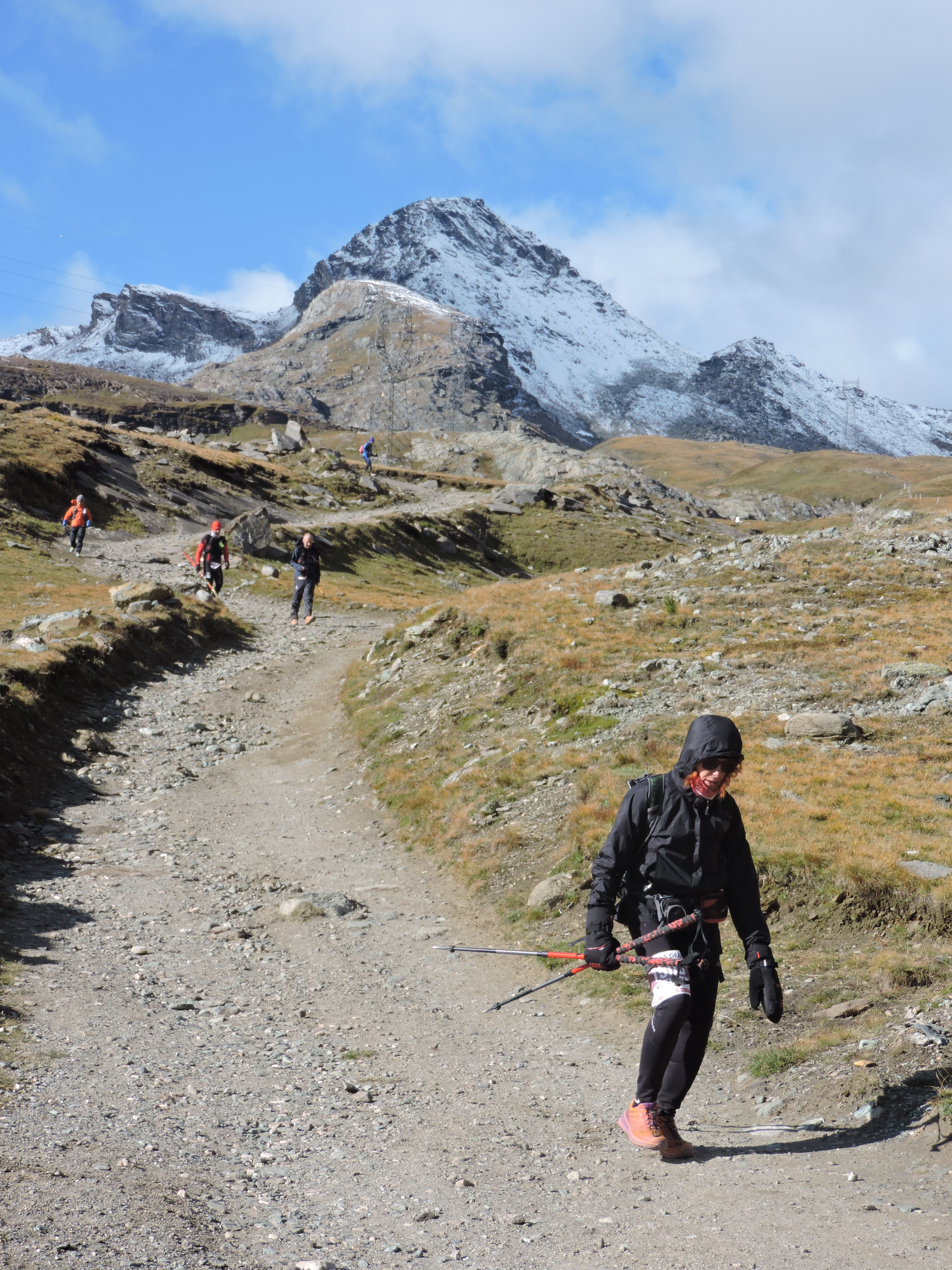
The race in the Champorcher valley

The trail is a tour of Aosta Valley following the two "High Routes" of the region, the Italian: Alta Via n.2 or French: Haute route n°2 for the first half of the race, and the Italian: Alta Via n.1 or French: Haute route n°1 for the second half of the race. During the tour, the runners cross 34 municipalities, 25 mountain passes over 2000 metres, 30 alpine lakes and 2 natural parks. The minimum altitude is 300 m (985 ft) and the highest is 3,300 m (10800 ft). The total elevation gain is about 24,000 m (78700 ft).

== Hall of Fame ==
Year	Winner (M)	Time	2nd place	Time	3rd place	Time	Winner (F)	Time	2nd place	Time	3rd place	Time
2010	(Italy) Ulrich Gross	80:27:23	(Spain) Salvador Calvo Redondo	86:47:54	(France) Guillaume Millet	87:17:37	(Italy) Anne Marie Gross	91:19:13	(Germany) Julia Böttger	100:03:51	(France) Corinne Favre	114:40:37
2011	(Switzerland) Jules Henri Gabioud	79:58:26	(France) Christophe Le Saux	84:09:46	(Spain) Pablo Criado Toca	89:43:07	(Italy) Anne Marie Gross (2)	91:28:21	(Italy) Patrizia Pensa	102:25:42	(Italy) Giuliana Arrigoni	102:26:05
2012	(Spain) Óscar Pérez	75:56:31	(France) Grégoire Millet	78:50:03	(France) Christophe Le Saux	80:14:14	(Italy) Francesca Canepa (Note: Tempo ricalcolato per la sospensione)	85:33:56	(Italy) Sonia Glarey	96:59:54	(Switzerland) Patrizia Pensa	97:06:15
2013	(Spain) Iker Carrera	70:04:15	(Spain) Óscar Pérez	70:29:41	(Italy) Franco Collé	72:05:23	(Italy) Francesca Canepa (2)	88:12:17	(Spain) Nerea Martinez	91:01:42	(Italy) Emanuela Scilla Tonetti	94:45:59
2014	(Italy) Franco Collé	71:49:10	(United States) Nick Hollon	76:29:38	(France) Christophe Le Saux e (France) Antoine Guillon	79:02:29	(France) Émilie Lecompte	85:53:14	(Italy) Lisa Borzani	94:43:46	(Switzerland) Denise Zimmermann	98:27:16
2015	(France) Patrick Bohard	80:20:35	(Italy) Gianluca Galeati	80:44:34	(France) Christophe Le Saux	81:19:25	(Switzerland) Denise Zimmermann (Note: Base vita Ollomont)	79:12:35	(Italy) Lisa Borzani	80:16:53	(France) Marina Plavan	85:55:00
2016	(Italy) Oliviero Bosatelli	75:10:22	(Spain) Óscar Pérez	81:14:50	(Spain) Pablo Criado Toca	83:40:10	(Italy) Lisa Borzani	91:09:44	(Canada) Stephanie Case	98:15:27	(France) Maria Semerjian	106:29:21
2017	(Spain) Javi Dominguez	67:52:15	(Italy) Olivero Bosatelli	69:16:19	(Italy) Andrea Macchi	74:51:14	(Italy) Lisa Borzani (2)	89:40:24	(Spain) Silvia Ainhoa Trigueros Garrote	97:43:06	(Italy) Marina Plavan	106:29:21
2018	(Italy) Franco Collé (2)	74:03:00	(Canada) Galen Reynolds	74:40:36	(Italy) Peter Kienzl	77:31:11	(Spain) Silvia Ainhoa Trigueros Garrote	87:50:31	(Italy) Scilla Tonetti e (United Kingdom) Jamie Aarons	95:54:35		
2019	(Italy) Oliviero Bosatelli (2)	72:37:13	(Canada) Galen Reynolds	77:06:12	(Italy) Danilo Lantermino	79:09:46	(Spain) Silvia Ainhoa Trigueros Garrote (2)	85:23:15	(France) Jocelyne Pauly	94:22:02	(Italy) Chiara Boggio	96:55:05
2020	COVID−19											
2021	(Italy) Franco Collé (3)	66:47:57	(Switzerland) Jonas Russi	67:03:00	(Sweden) Petter Restorp	74:36:00	(Spain) Silvia Ainhoa Trigueros Garrote (3)	87:57:50	(Italy) Melissa Paganelli	91:35:07	(United Kingdom) Nicky Spinks	99:16:50
2022	(Switzerland) Jonas Russi	70:31:36	(Italy) Simone Corsini	75:27:33	(Italy) Andrea Macchi	76:43:50	(United Kingdom) Sabrina Verjee	80:19:38	(Spain) Silvia Ainhoa Trigueros Garrote	84:58:55	(France) Sandrine Béranger	89:40:04
2023	(Italy) Franco Collé (4)	66:39:16	(France) Olivier Romain	69:49:38	(Canada) Galen Reynolds	71:22:30	(United Kingdom) Emma Stuart	82:21:44	(France) Jocelyne Pauly	84:36:21	(Italy) Elisabetta Negra	88:37:42
2024	(France) François D'Haene	69:08:32	(France) Beñat Marmissolle	73:10:18	(Switzerland) Martin Perrier	75:35:59	(Germany) Katharina Hartmuth	79:10:40	(United Kingdom) Sabrina Verjee	84:03:21	(France) Claire Bannwarth	85:02:47
2026	(China) Zhao Jia-Ju	65:55:22 (Record)	(Switzerland) Jonathan Schindler	66:55:06	(China) Zhang Wei-Qiang	71:53:56	(Germany) Katharina Hartmuth	67:10:09 (Record)	(China) Zhang Hui-Ping	80:35:31	(Brazil) Manuela Vilaseca	82:31:56

== Media coverage ==
The race has received significant media coverage both on general television broadcasts and in the general press as well as in specialized media in the fields of running, hiking and mountaineering. For example, Meridiani Montagna, one of the reference magazines for enthusiasts, devoted an extensive article to the preparation of the race in its May 2010 issue.

== TOR 130 - Tot Dret ==
Within the Tor des Geants, since the 2017 edition, a trail race called Tot Dret has been organized. The name, which in Valdôtain patois means "straight ahead" (a version is also present in Titsch, Groadus), refers to the fact that, compared to the Tor, in which one can identify an outward route (the Alta Via della Valle d'Aosta No. 2) and a return route (the Alta Via della Valle d'Aosta No. 1), in the Tot Dret only the Alta Via della Valle d'Aosta No. 1 is followed; therefore it can be defined as "straight ahead", with departure from Gressoney-Saint-Jean and arrival in Courmayeur. The route is 140 kilometres long with a positive elevation gain of 12,000 metres. Along the route there are several refreshment points (every 7–10 km) and a life base in Oyace. Like the Tor, it takes place in a single stage, with free pace, within a limited time of 44 hours, under a semi-self-sufficiency regime.

Starting from the 2019 edition, Tot Dret became TOR130 - Tot Dret, a qualifying race for the Tor des Geants.

The first edition of the Tot Dret took place in 2017; the winner was the Valdôtain Cesare Clap with a time of 24h 15m 11s.

In 2018 the race was won by Marco Mangaretto with a time of 24h 1m 7s. Behind him on the podium were Ruben Bovet and Radeka Geoffrey.

In 2019 the athlete Giuliano Cavallo finished in first place at the finish line in Courmayeur, setting a new course record.

In 2020 the event did not take place due to the COVID-19 pandemic.

In 2021 the competition was won by Henri Grosjacques ahead of Christophe Tieran and Raphael Paronuzzi.

In 2022 the Valdôtain Henri Grosjacques crossed the finish line in Courmayeur in first place, setting a new course record: 22h 06m 31s.

In 2023 the winner was the South Tyrolean Daniel Jung. The runner delivered a strong performance, improving the race record to 21h 11m 04s.

In 2024 the Lombard Gionata Cogliati won the race. The victory came in record time: the Team Kailas athlete stopped the clock at 21h 10m 09s, improving the previous race record by about one minute.

In 2025 Davide Rivero won the TOR130 - Tot Dret. The runner from Cuneo crossed the finish line in Courmayeur first with a time of 21h 44m 33s. Together with Rivero, Mirko Marchi and Gabriel Dupont reached the podium in second and third place respectively.

== TOR 450 - Tor des Glaciers ==
Within the Tor des Geants, starting from the 2019 edition (TORX), a trail race called Tor des Glaciers ("Tour of the Glaciers" in Valdôtain patois) has been organized. The race is longer than the Tor des Geants: it covers about 450 km with more than 32,000 metres of elevation gain, and it is open only to people who have finished the Tor in previous years within a maximum time of 130 hours, for a maximum of 100 competitors (2019). The route runs along the Alta Vie 3 and 4 of the Aosta Valley, trails that have never been officially formalized.

The first edition in 2019 was won by the Varese-born naturalized Frenchman Luca Papi, who completed the race in 134 hours and 10 minutes. The same Luca Papi confirmed his victory in 2021, completing the route in 138 hours and 17 minutes together with the Swiss Jules Henri Gabioud.

== Gallery ==
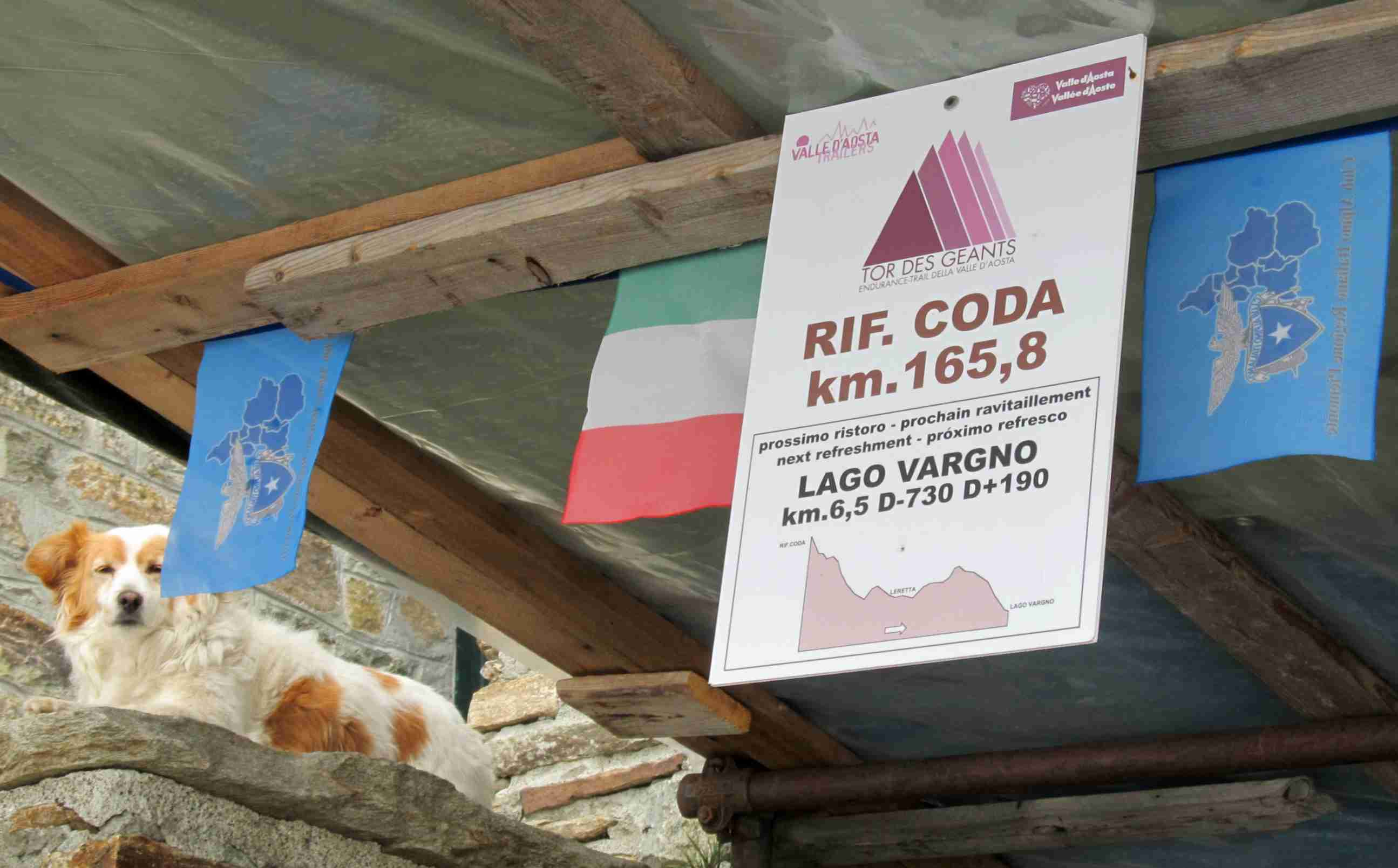
Indications at Coda refuge.

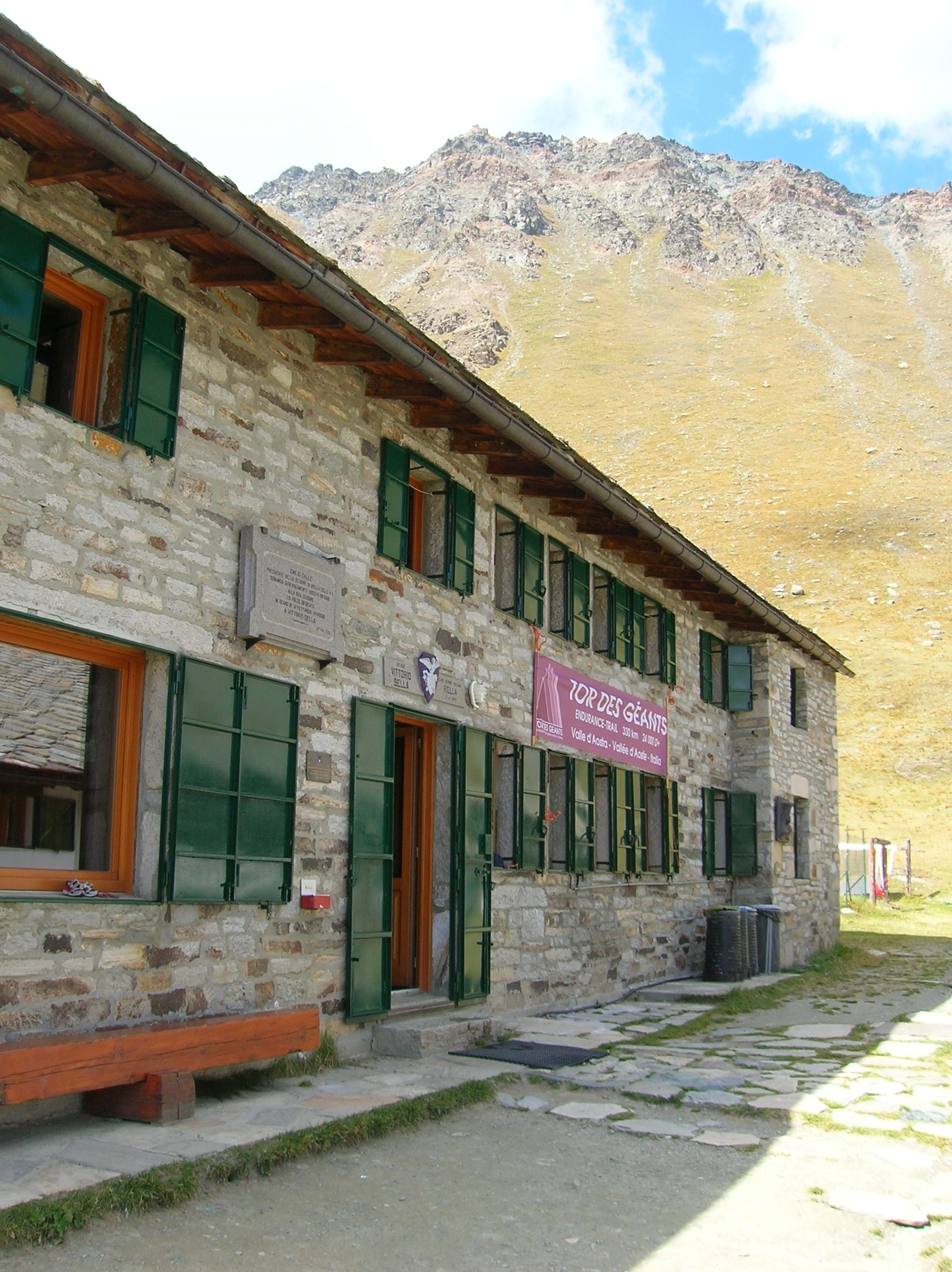
Tor des Géants at refuge Victor Sella.

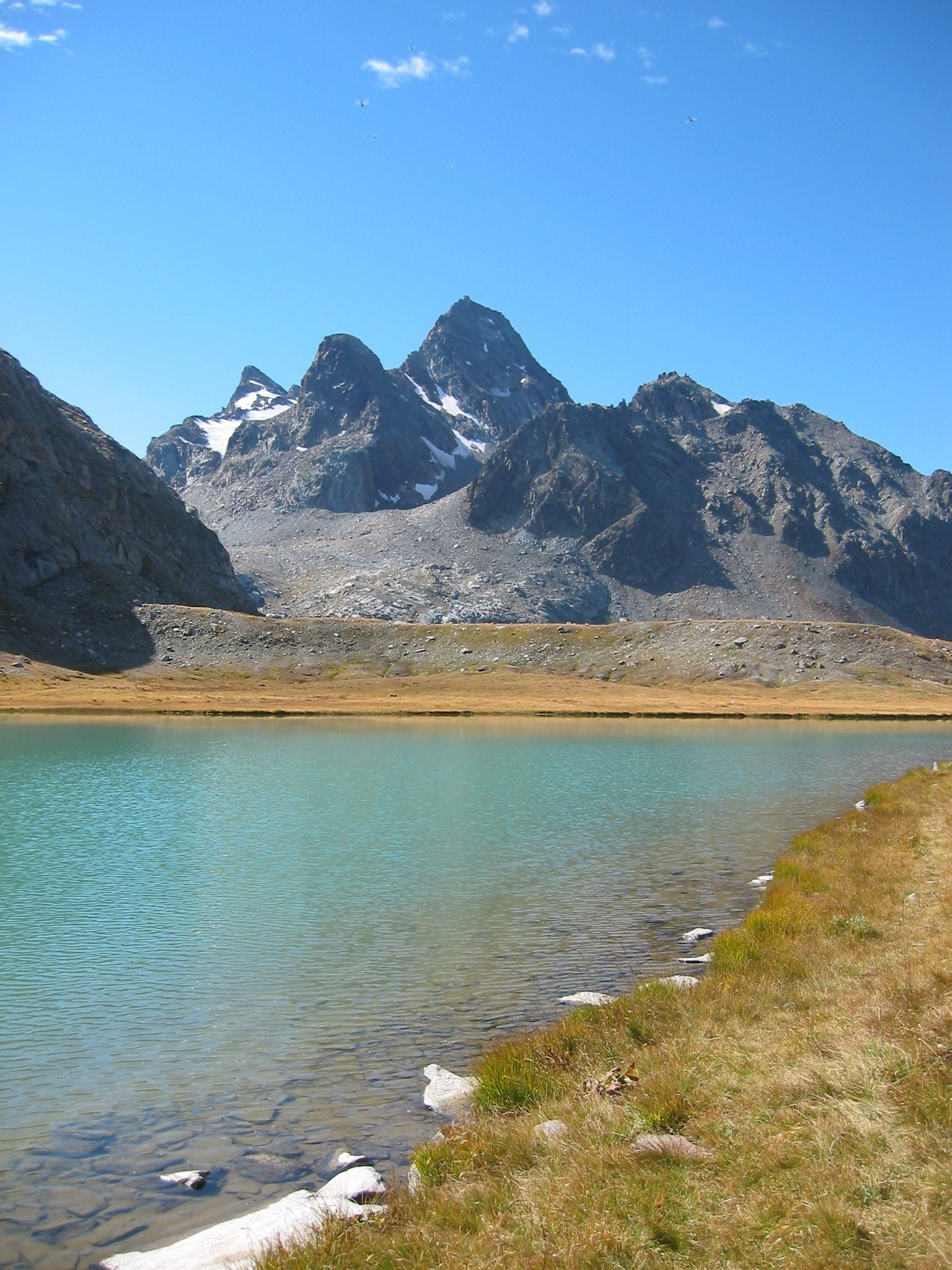
The Grand Assaly complex seen from Albert Deffeyes refuge.

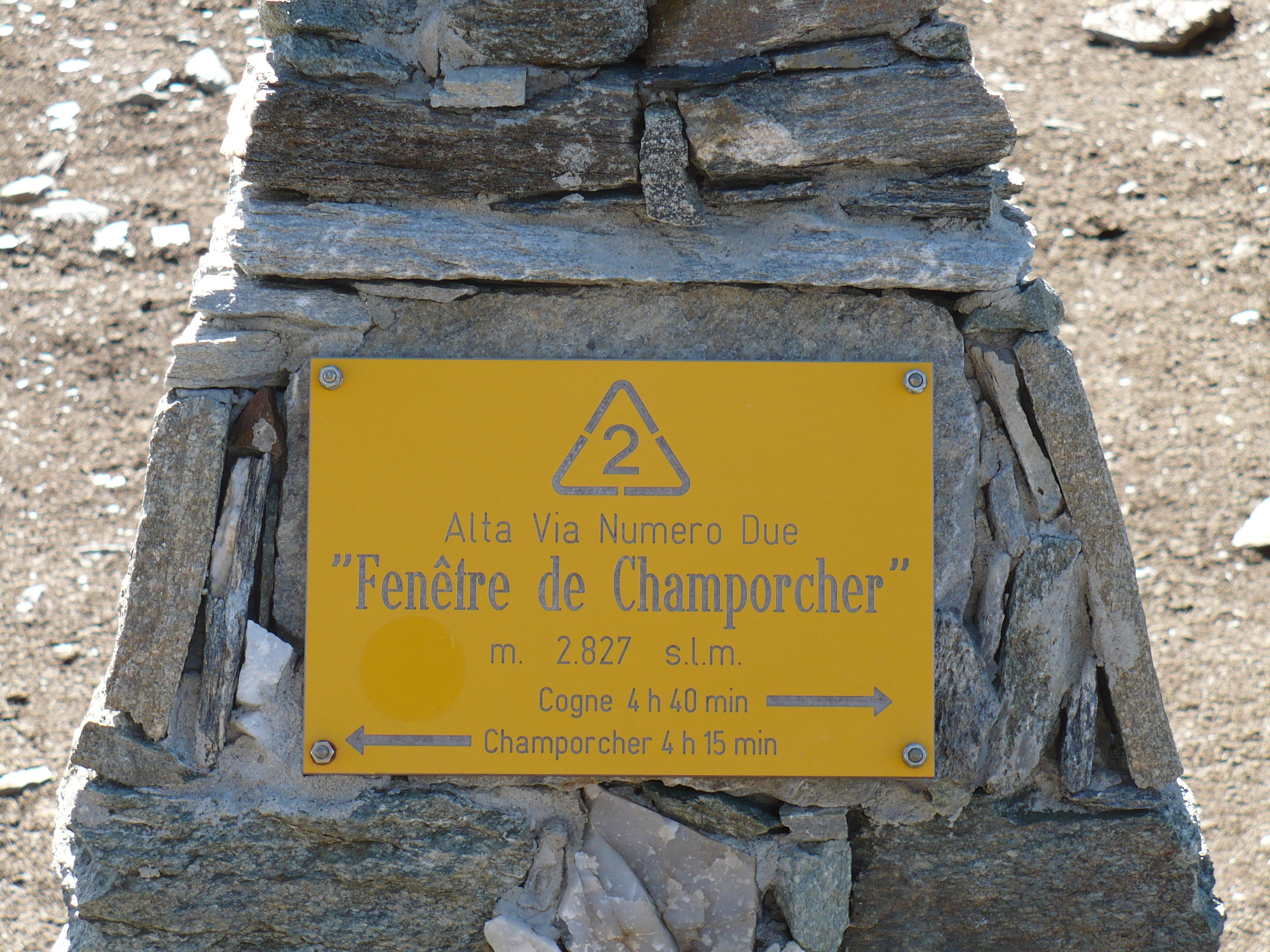
The "Fenêtre de Champorcher", after the first 115 km.

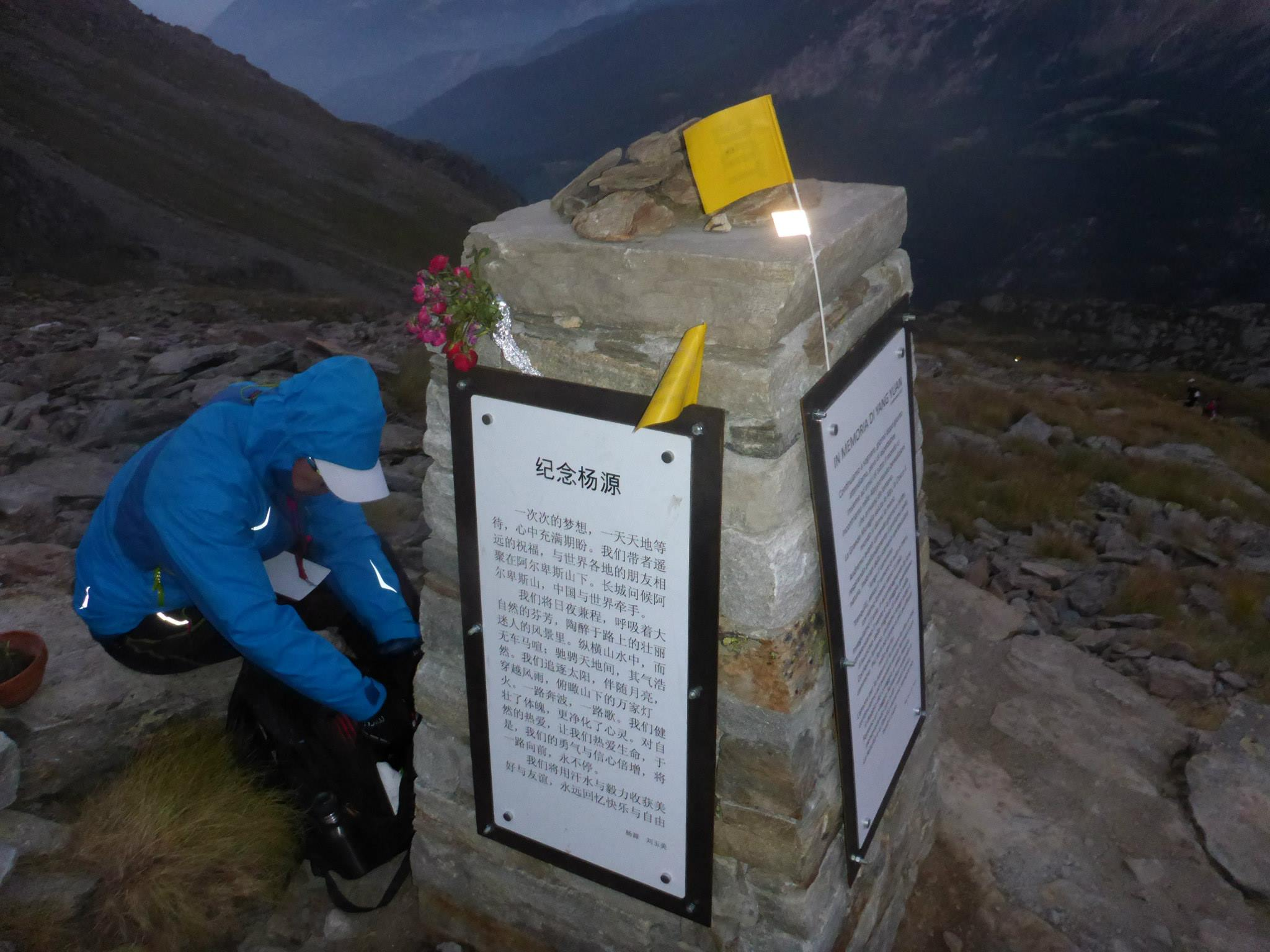
Yang Yuan monument at night

== See also ==
- Sports in Aosta Valley
- Trail running
