= World Mountain and Trail Running Championships =

- Formerly: World Mountain Running Championships and IAU Trail World Championships
- Sport: Athletics (mountain running, trail running)
- First season: 2022
- Sponsor: World Athletics
- Website: worldathletics.org/competitions/world-mountain-and-trail-running-championships

The World Mountain and Trail Running Championships (WMTRC) decides the world champions in mountain running and trail running, two out-of-stadia disciplines in the sport of athletics. The event was founded by World Athletics and the first edition was scheduled for 2021 and held in 2022 after being postponed. Prior to 2022, the World Mountain Running Championships and IAU Trail World Championships were held as two separate events.

== Editions ==
Edition	Year	City	Country	Date
1st	2022	Chiang Mai	Thailand	4–6 November
2nd	2023	Innsbruck-Stubaital	Austria	6–10 June
3rd	2025	Canfranc	Spain	25–28 September
4th	2027	Cape Town	South Africa	6–10 October

== History ==
The founding of the event required coordination between four different running organizations: the World Mountain Running Association, the International Trail Running Association, the International Association of Ultrarunners, and World Athletics. It was considered a "patched-together partnership" with World Athletics sponsoring the event in a push to bring trail running to the 2032 Summer Olympics. The inaugural event was postponed to 2022 due to the COVID-19 pandemic.

The 2025 event was considered the most competitive WMTRC to that point. It was criticized, however, for dedicating more live stream coverage to the men's races than the women's races. The growth in trail running has attracted money from brands like Nike, Inc.
