= Allie Bailey (runner) =

British ultrarunner and author

Personal information
- Born: 1981 (age 43–44)
- Website: www.alliebailey.co.uk

Sport
- Sport: trail running

Allie Bailey (born 1981) is a British ultrarunner and author.

In 2022, Bailey was voted one of the most inspiring female adventurers in the UK. In 2024, she wrote There is no Wall, an account of the alcoholism, depression and severe mental breakdowns which almost cost her her life.
