= New Balance 574 =

Hybrid road/trail running shoe

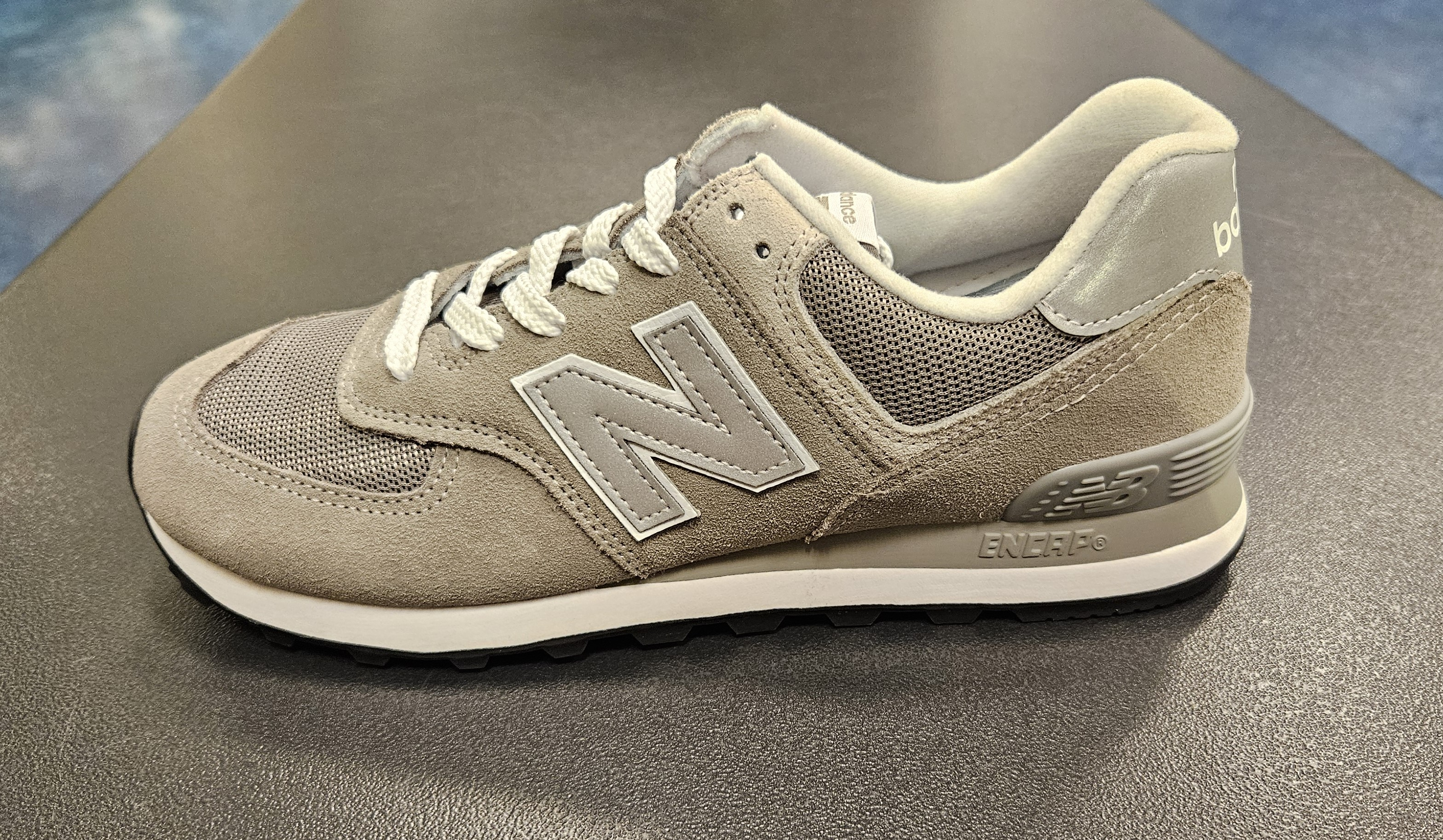
- Type: Sneakers
- Inventor: New Balance
- Inception: 1988; 38 years ago
- Manufacturer: New Balance
- Available: Yes

The New Balance 574 is a hybrid road/trail running shoe produced by New Balance. The shoe is synonymous with New Balance, and is seen as the symbol for the company. It has been described as the "most New Balance shoe" due to its modest design and grey colorway, along with its emphasis on comfort and quality.

== Overview ==
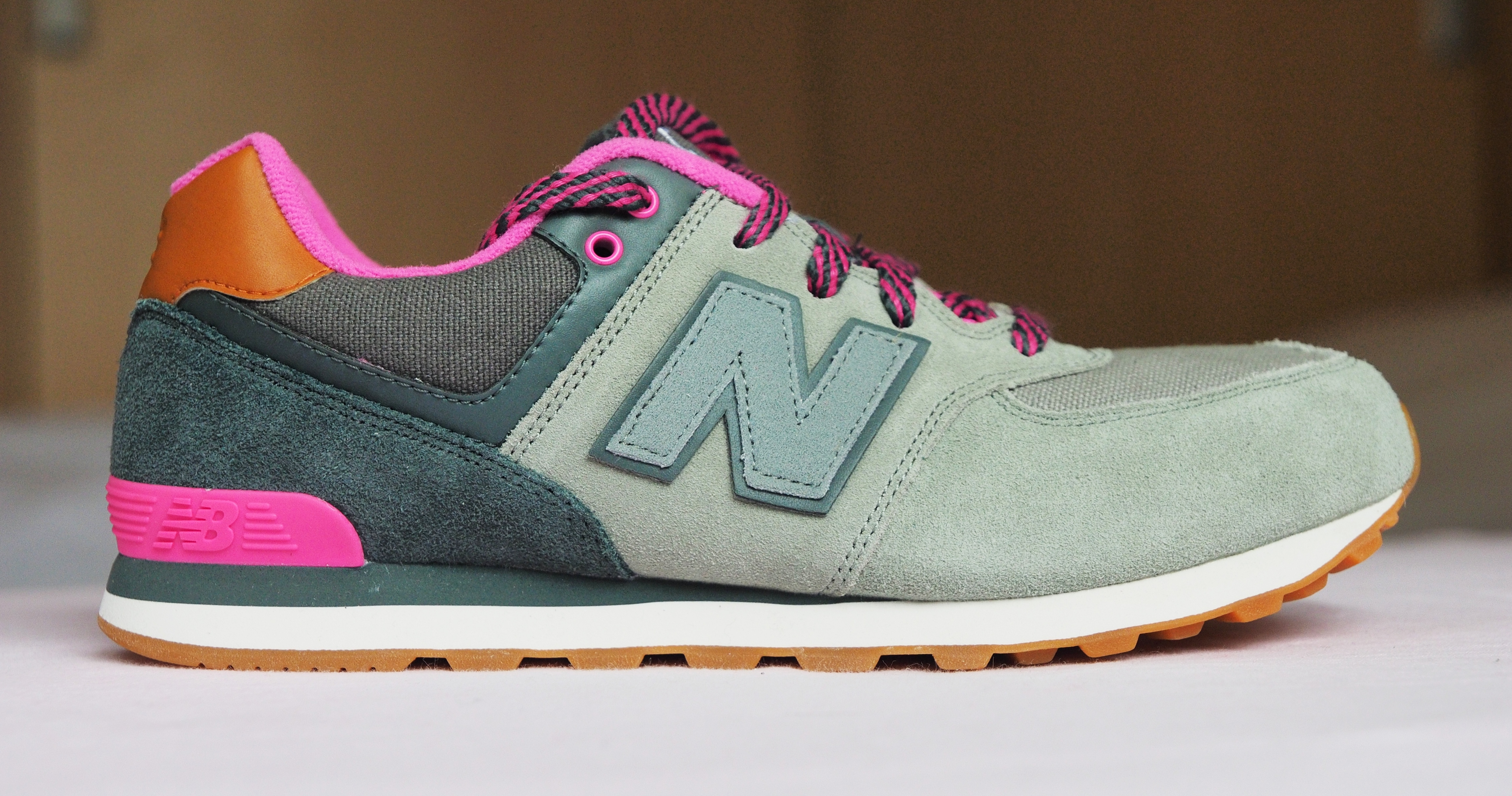
A "Collegiate Pack" pair of New Balance 574s

The 500 series was created to target consumers who wanted to run offroad, on rougher terrain similar to trail running. The 500s series used durable suede, breathable mesh, and aggressive outsoles to be able to handle the terrain. New Balance would release the first model in the series, the 575, in 1986. Updated versions of the line would follow, with the 576 in 1988, and the 577 in 1989. The popularity of the series led New Balance to release a cheaper alternative in the line for budget consumers.

The cheaper version would eventually be called the 574, and would be designed by longtime New Balance designer Steven Smith. The design of the shoe was a combination of different models. The upper was a stripped-down version of the 576, while the bottom was taken from the then-unreleased 577. The shoe featured the company's "ENCAP" technology, which stood for "encapsulated", and provided better stability for the wearer. ENCAP is a soft piece of EVA surrounded by a hard plastic ring under the heel in the midsole. The shoe was released in 1988 to massive success.

Despite being created as a budget product, the shoe became an iconic symbol of fashion and sneakers. It has been described as the "most New Balance shoe" due to its modest design and grey colorway, along with its emphasis on comfort and quality.

== Models ==
=== 574 Greens ===
This is a golf variant which was released in 2021. The upper features the same design as the original, but with a different sole made for the terrain of golf courses.

==== 574 Greens v2 ====
This is a followup to the golf shoe, released in 2023. It features updated cushioning and sole.

=== 574+ ===
This is a platform version that features two EVA foams stacked on top of each other, with a smaller ENCAP piece in the shoe. It was released in 2022.

=== Numeric 574 ===
This is a skateboarding shoe released in 2023. It features a lower top compared to the original, and a vulcanized rubber outsole for better control of the board.
