= Ruby Muir =

New Zealand runner (born 1991)

Personal information
- Nationality: New Zealand
- Born: 1 July 1991 (age 35)

Sport
- Sport: Running
- Club: Tauranga Ramblers

Ruby Muir (born 1 July 1991) is an ultra-endurance runner from New Zealand. In 2017 she won the national women's cross-country event.

== Life ==
Muir grew up in Whenaukite on the Coromandel Peninsula in the North Island of New Zealand and attended Mercury Bay Area School. While at high school she became involved with training on Mount Ruapehu for the Hillary Adventure Race, a five-day hiking adventure racing event. In 2009 she entered the Goat Adventure Run, also on Ruapehu, as her first endurance event and won. She then began competing in endurance and trail marathons regularly.

In 2013 and 2015 Muir won the Tarawera Ultramarathon and she has won the Kepler Challenge six times. In 2013 she also won the Otter African Trail Run in South Africa.

In 2014 Muir suffered an injury while running the Ultra Du Mont Blanc in France and as a result she began running shorter races. In 2015 she won the Wellington Marathon.
