= Kepler Challenge =

Coordinates: 45.440456°S 167.686254°E

- Kepler Challenge Logo
- Date: Early December
- Location: Fiordland National Park, New Zealand
- Event type: Mountain
- Distance: 60km (Luxmore Grunt 27km)
- Primary sponsor: FreshChoice
- Established: 1988
- Course records: Men: 4:33:37; Women: 5:23:34; Luxmore Grunt Men: 1:52:30; Luxmore Grunt Women: 2:04:18
- Website: www.keplerchallenge.co.nz

The Kepler Challenge Mountain Run is the premier mountain running event in New Zealand and follows the 60 km Kepler Track through the Fiordland National Park. It has been held annually since 1988, and draws competitors from throughout New Zealand and around the world. Around 450 runners enter the event with nearly all completing the demanding course.

== Route ==
Starting at the Control Gates of Lake Te Anau the route follows an easy first 6 km before it takes a steady climb to the Luxmore Hut. The next 12 km offer wonderful views of the South Fiord along the undulating tops before a spectacular descent to the Iris Burn Hut. A gradual 17 km journey down the Iris Burn brings competitors to the Moturau Hut on Lake Manapouri and from there a 6 km run to the last checkpoint at Rainbow Reach. The home straight follows alongside the Waiau River and back to the Control Gates.

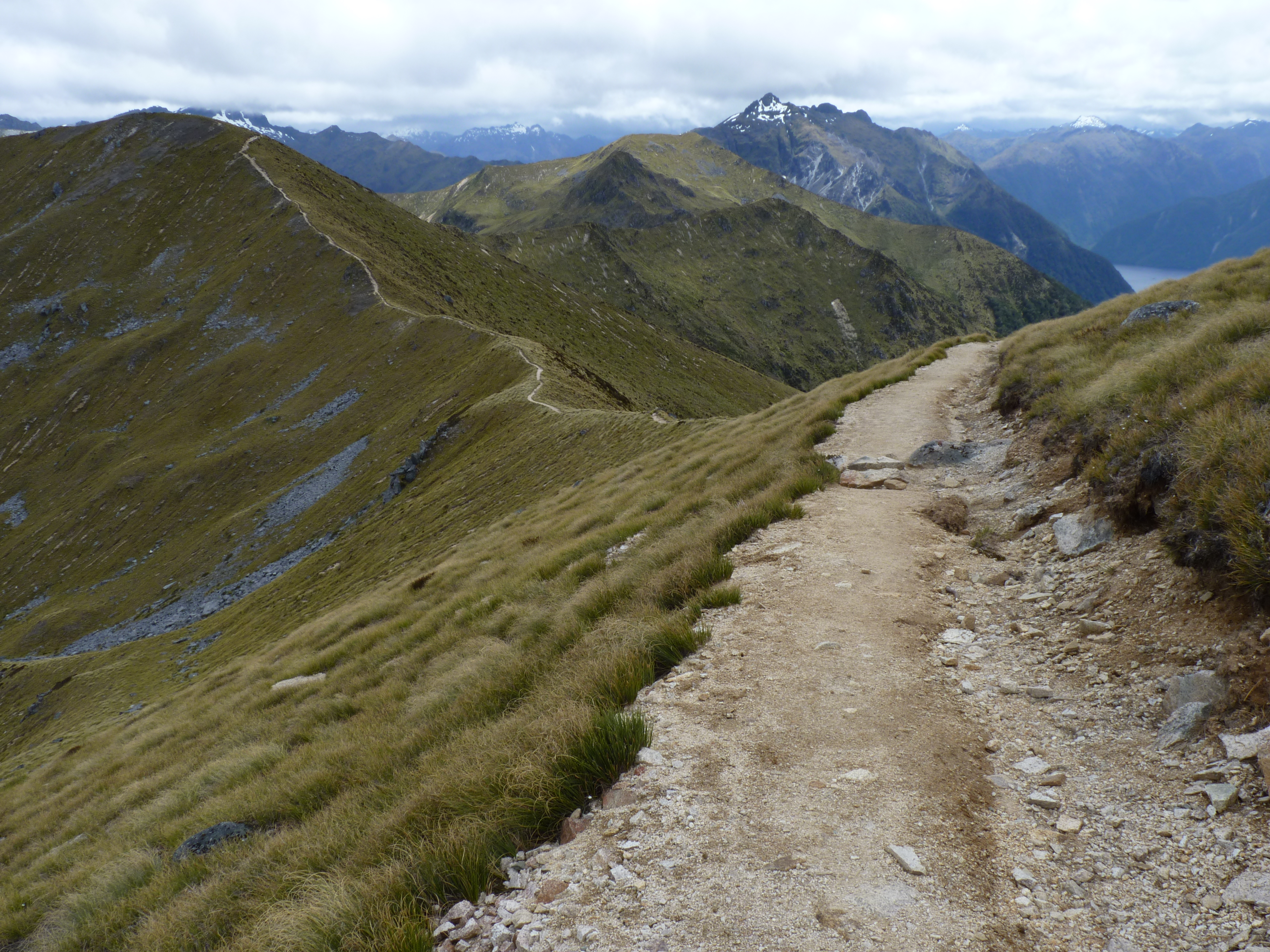
Alpine running section of the track

== Records ==
In 2013 the men's record was beaten by Martin Dent with a time of 4h33m37s surpassing the record of 4h37m41s was which held by Phil Costley, who in December 2005 beat Russell Hurring's previous record of 4h41m32s (set in 1993). Zelah Morrall smashed the women's race record repeatedly, last in 2003 by a further 10 minutes her best time being 5h23m34s. A number of competitors should complete the course in less than 5 hours. Others may take up to 11 hours. As of 2006, Murray Thomas, an engineer from Alexandra has run in and completed all 19 Kepler Challenges, while Alan Reid, a school teacher from Greymouth at the time (now Lumsden), and Peter Dunne, who works for Badminton NZ, have each run 18.

From 2010–2012 Vajin Armstrong finished first three years in a row. Ruby Muir has been the first female finisher six times.

In 2009, one of the competitors, Malcolm Law, completed the run as the last stage in a "7-in-7 challenge", in which he became the first person to run all of New Zealand's 7 Great Walks in 7 days (a total of 360 km, or 9 marathons), in aid of the Leukemia and Blood Foundation of New Zealand.

Also in 2009, Murray Thomas returned from overseas to complete his 21st challenge, Ray Willett (Te Anau) completed his 21st challenge and Alan Reid completed his 21st event from 22 starts (Alan withdrew during the 2006 event due to injury/knee surgery issues).

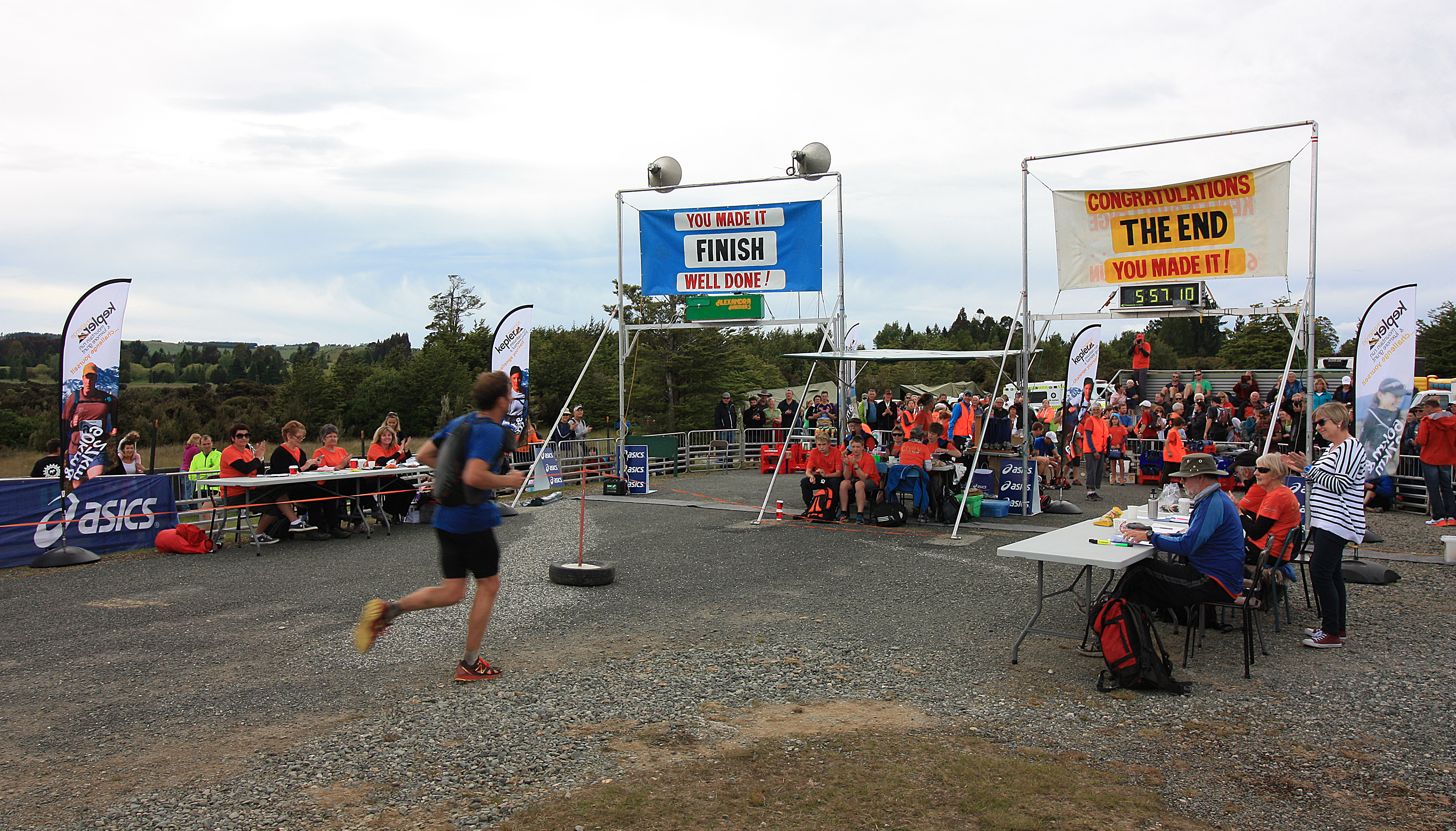
Finish line of the Kepler Challenge and Luxmore Grunt events.

== Community support ==
Such an event requires a large support team to operate the checkpoints, provide communications, first aid and other services. Nearly 200 local people contribute in some way to ensure that the event runs smoothly. Thousands of voluntary hours go into organising the race but it is worth all the effort to make it a major highlight on the Fiordland Calendar. The event organised by the Kepler Challenge Mountain Run Trust and its Organising Committee. The Trust is a charitable entity and uses any surplus to fund local community projects.

== Luxmore Grunt ==
The Luxmore Grunt is held on the same race day as the Kepler Challenge but is much shorter being only 27 km in distance. Competitors follow the same route starting at the control gates but then turn around at Luxmore Hut and head back down to the start/finish line. This event was limited to 150 runners annually but since 2013 has been increased to 200 because of its growing popularity.

== See also ==
- Trail running
