= Sharon Shobha Devi Lingham =

Sharon Shobha Devi Lingham (Sharon Lingham) (11 December 1956 – 8 March 2010) (née Verma) was a New Zealand entrepreneur and philanthropist.

== Life and career ==
She was born to a Rajasthani Arya Samaj Indian family, before moving to New Zealand to settle. She was a well-known personality in the Christchurch-Canterbury region of New Zealand, being involved in local media television stations (including CTV), and also as a celebrity ambassador, with her well-known website, www.sharonlingham.com. She was also the supporter of many local charities, including the Royal New Zealand Foundation for the Blind, KidsCan and Ronald McDonald House.

In 2006 she organised a global wedding extravaganza in Victoria Square as a fundraiser for The Salvation Army. Her Global Extravaganza in 2008 and 2009 in Victoria Square in Christchurch also attracted many people, and brought people of different ethnicities together.

She also ran for the Christchurch City Council Hagley-Ferrymead and Shirley-Papanui wards.

Lingham was variously known as the "Fuchsia Queen" through her business Canterbury Fuchsia Centre, and later known as the "Limousine Queen", through her business Crown Limousines NZ Ltd, which provided luxury transport for the many celebrities that came into the region.

== Death ==
Lingham died of a subarachnoid haemorrhage on 8 March 2010.
