= Tatry Running Tour =

Trail running competition

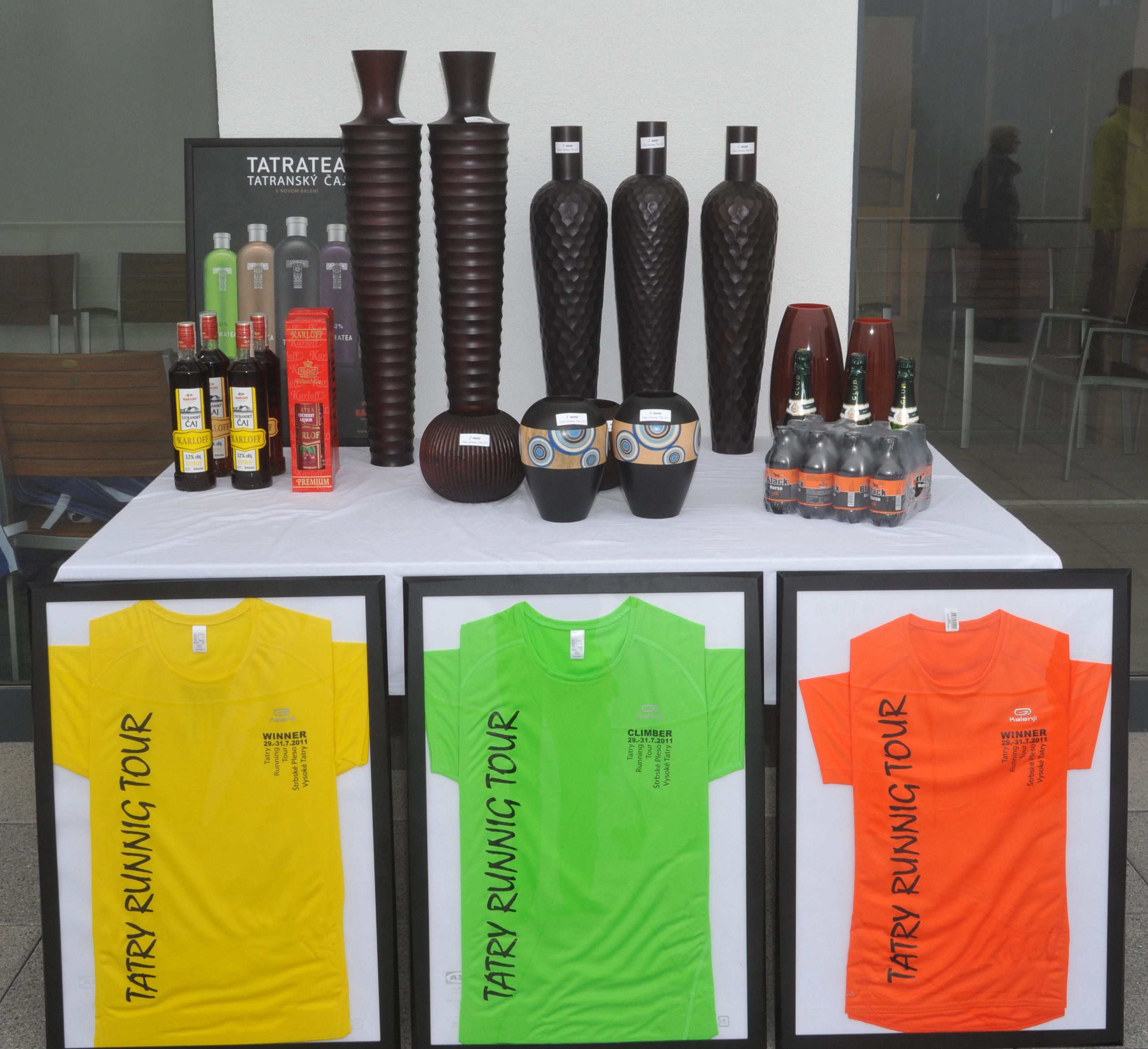
- Winners jersey

Race details
- Region: Slovakia, High Tatras, Štrbské Pleso
- Discipline: Trail running
- Type: Stage race
- Organiser: Sport Club 1896 Štrbské Pleso
- Race director: Peter Vegh

History
- First edition: 2011
- Editions: 7
- First winner: Ondráček Tomáš (CZE)
- Most wins: Ryška Vít (2012, 2013, 2015, 2016) (CZE) Vnenčáková Soňa (2012, 2013, 2015) (SVK)
- Most recent: Orolín Pavol (SVK)

Tatry Running Tour is a stage structured trail running competition. It is organized mainly for running enthusiasts who would like to enhance their stay in the High Tatras.

== Tatry Running Tour 2011 ==
Tatry Running Tour 2011 was the 1st edition of the three stage trail running competition.

1. Stage 3.5 km Night Run, Ascent/Descent: 30 m
2. Stage 12.1 km Panorama Run, Ascent/Descent:320 m
3. Stage 5.5 km Cross Run, Ascent/Descent: 280 m

Maps and profile

== Tatry Running Tour 2012 ==
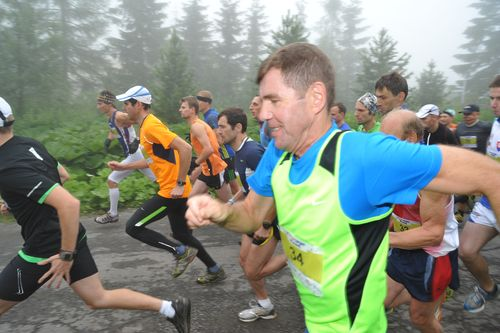
2011

Tatry Running Tour 2012 was the 2nd edition of the three stage trail running competition.

1. Stage 3.5 km Night Run, Ascent/Descent: 30 m
2. Stage 12.1 km Panorama Run, Ascent/Descent:320 m
3. Stage 5.5 km Cross Run, Ascent/Descent: 280 m

Maps and profile

== Tatry Running Tour 2013 ==
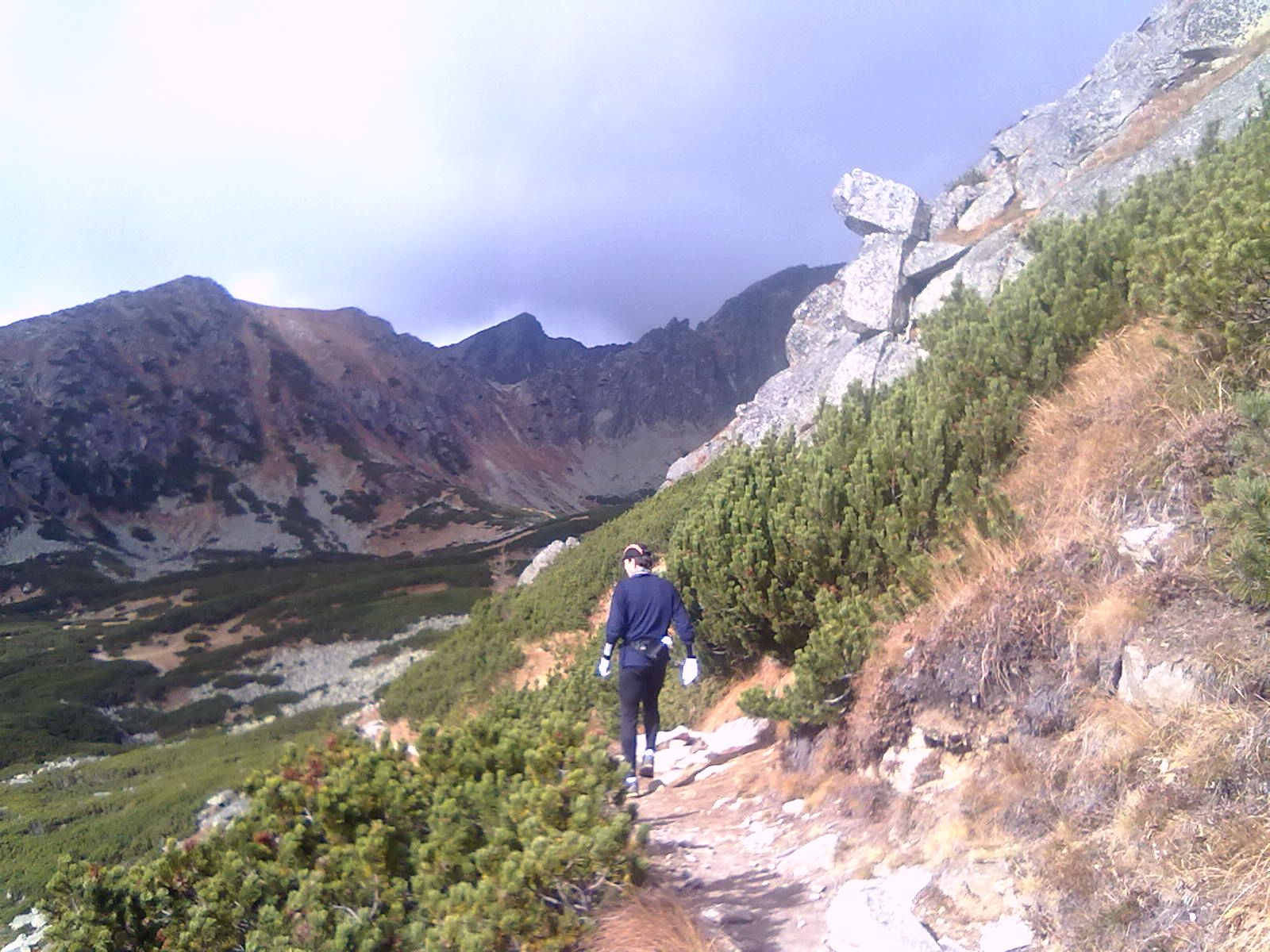
SKY&CLOUDS 2013

Tatry Running Tour 2013 was the 3rd edition of the three stage trail running competition.

1. Stage 3.5 km Night Run, Ascent/Descent: 30 m
2. Stage 12.1 km Cross Run, Ascent/Descent:320 m
3. Stage 7.5 km Interski Run, Ascent/Descent: 280 m

== Tatry Running Tour 2014 ==
Tatry Running Tour 2014 was the 4th edition of the three stage trail running competition.

1. Stage 3.5 km Night Run, Ascent/Descent: 30 m
2. Stage 12.1 km Cross Run, Ascent/Descent:320 m
3. Stage 7.5 km Interski Run, Ascent/Descent: 280 m

== Tatry Running Tour 2015 ==
CLASSIC Tatry Running Tour 2015 was the 5th edition of the three stage trail running competition.

1. Stage 4.5 km Night Run, Ascent/Descent: 30 m
2. Stage 10.1 km Cross Run, Ascent/Descent:320 m
3. Stage 7.5 km Interski Run, Ascent/Descent: 280 m

EXTREME Tatry Running Tour Extreme 2015 was the 1st edition of the three stage trail running competition.

1. Stage 4.5 km Night Run, Ascent/Descent: 30 m
2. Stage 33 km, Sky & Clouds Run Ascent/Descent: 935m
3. Stage 7.5 km Interski Run, Ascent/Descent: 280 m

== Tatry Running Tour 2016 ==
CLASSIC Tatry Running Tour 2016 was the 6th edition of the three stage trail running competition.

1. Stage 4.5 km Night Run, Ascent/Descent: 30 m
2. Stage 12.5 km Cross Run, Ascent/Descent:320 m
3. Stage 7.5 km Interski Run, Ascent/Descent: 280 m

EXTREME Tatry Running Tour Extreme 2016 was the 2nd edition of the three stage trail running competition.

1. Stage 4.5 km Night Run, Ascent/Descent: 30 m
2. Stage 33 km, Sky & Clouds Run Ascent/Descent: 935m
3. Stage 7.5 km Interski Run, Ascent/Descent: 280 m

Maps and profile

== Sky & Clouds Run 21km / 33km ==
Sky & Clouds Run 21 km, Ascent/Descent: 935m. Alpine extreme half marathon distance. The Sky & Clouds Run takes place together with the 2nd stage of the Tatry Running Tour. The runners continue up to the highest point at the elevation of 2140 m.

== Tatry Running Tour 2017 ==
CLASSIC Tatry Running Tour 2017 was the 7th edition of the three stage trail running competition.

1. Stage 4.5 km Night Run, Ascent/Descent: 30 m
2. Stage 12.5 km Cross Run, Ascent/Descent:320 m
3. Stage 7.5 km Interski Run, Ascent/Descent: 280 m

EXTREME Tatry Running Tour Extreme 2017 was the 3nd edition of the three stage trail running competition.

1. Stage 4.5 km Night Run, Ascent/Descent: 30 m
2. Stage 33 km, Sky & Clouds Run Ascent/Descent: 935m
3. Stage 7.5 km Interski Run, Ascent/Descent: 280 m

== Sky & Clouds Run 21km / 33km ==
Sky & Clouds Run 21 km, Ascent/Descent: 935m. Alpine extreme half marathon distance. The Sky & Clouds Run takes place together with the 2nd stage of the Tatry Running Tour. The runners continue up to the highest point at the elevation of 2140 m.

Overall results 2017 (in Czech)

== Tatry Running Tour 2018 ==
CLASSIC Tatry Running Tour 2018 was the 8th edition of the three stage trail running competition.

1. Stage 4.5 km Night Run, Ascent/Descent: 30 m
2. Stage 12.5 km Cross Run, Ascent/Descent:320 m
3. Stage 7.5 km Interski Run, Ascent/Descent: 280 m

EXTREME Tatry Running Tour Extreme 2018 was the 4th edition of the three stage trail running competition.

1. Stage 4.5 km Night Run, Ascent/Descent: 30 m
2. Stage 33 km, Sky & Clouds Run Ascent/Descent: 935m
3. Stage 7.5 km Interski Run, Ascent/Descent: 280 m

== Sky & Clouds Run 21km / 33km ==
Sky & Clouds Run 21 km, Ascent/Descent: 935m. Alpine extreme half marathon distance. The Sky & Clouds Run takes place together with the 2nd stage of the Tatry Running Tour. The runners continue up to the highest point at the elevation of 2140 m.

Overall results 2018 (in Czech)

== Tatry Running Tour 2019 ==
CLASSIC Tatry Running Tour 2019 was the 9th edition of the three stage trail running competition.

1. Stage 4.5 km Night Run, Ascent/Descent: 30 m
2. Stage 12.5 km Cross Run, Ascent/Descent:320 m
3. Stage 7.5 km Interski Run, Ascent/Descent: 280 m

EXTREME Tatry Running Tour Extreme 2019 was the 5th edition of the three stage trail running competition.

1. Stage 4.5 km Night Run, Ascent/Descent: 30 m
2. Stage 33 km, Sky & Clouds Run Ascent/Descent: 935m
3. Stage 7.5 km Interski Run, Ascent/Descent: 280 m

== Sky & Clouds Run 21km / 33km ==
Sky & Clouds Run 21 km, Ascent/Descent: 935m. Alpine extreme half marathon distance. The Sky & Clouds Run takes place together with the 2nd stage of the Tatry Running Tour. The runners continue up to the highest point at the elevation of 2140 m.

Overall results 2019 (in Czech)

== Winners Tatry Running Tour - CLASSIC ==
Year	Winner M	Winner F	Climber	Full results
2011	Ondráček Tomáš (CZE)	Macháčková Šárka (CZE)	Matanin-Konečný Marcel (SVK)	Full results 2011
2012	Gergardt Artur (UKR)	Vnenčáková Soňa (SVK)	Vrábel Mikuláš (SVK)	Full results 2012
2013	Ryška Vít (CZE)	Vnenčáková Soňa (SVK)	Széll Tamáš (HUN)	Full results 2013
2014	Ryška Vít (CZE)	Olejárová Viera (SVK)	Bizoň Tomáš (SVK)	Full results 2014
2015	Ryška Vít (CZE)	Vnenčáková Soňa (SVK)	Hrdina Tomáš (CZE)	Full results 2015
2016	Ryška Vít (CZE)	Mihoková Timea (SVK)	Lukáč Mirosolav (SVK)	Full results 2016
2017	Orolín Pavol (SVK)	Pukolvá Patrícia (SVK)	Ryška Vít (CZE)	Full results 2017
2018	Orolín Pavol (SVK)	Pukolvá Patrícia (SVK)	Griger Tomáš (SVK)	Full results 2018
2019	Orolín Pavol (SVK)	Mihoková Timea (SVK)	Griger Tomáš (SVK)	Full results 2019

== Winners Tatry Running Tour - EXTREME ==
Year	Winner M	Winner F	Full results
2015	Czech Republic Jiří Petr	Slovakia Lukáčová Šulcová Denisa	Full results 2015
2016	Czech Republic Jiří Petr	Czech Republic Urbancová Zuzana	Full results 2016
2017	Czech Republic Jiří Petr	Slovakia Čibová Martina	Full results 2017
2018	Czech Republic Jiří Petr	Slovakia Beniačová Linda	Full results 2018
2019	Slovakia Halasz Martin	Hungary Dendel Nikolet	Full results 2019

== Winner Sky&Clouds Run 22km / 33km ==
Ročník	Winner M	Winner F	Full results
2013	Slovakia Bizoň Tomáš	Italy Innerebner Karin	Full results 2013
2014	Slovakia Vnenčák Matúš	Hungary Juhasz Rozalinda	Full results 2014
2015	Czech Republic Jiří Petr	Poland Natalia Tomasiak	Full results 2015
2016	Czech Republic Jiří Petr	Poland Olga Łyjak	Full results 2016
2017	Czech Republic Křivohlávek Tomáš	United States Harkins Erika	Full results 2017
2018	Czech Republic Jiří Petr	Slovakia Beniačová Linda	Full results 2018
2019	Slovakia Halasz Martin	Hungary Dendel Nikolet	Full results 2019
