= Scenic Trail =

Skyrunning competition in Lugano, Switzerland

- Date: June
- Location: (Switzerland) Lugano
- Event type: Ultra SkyMarathon; SkyMarathon; SkyRace; Vertical Kilometer
- Distance: 113 km / 7,400 m 54 km / 3,800 m 27 km / 2,200 m 4.5 km / 880 m
- Established: 2013
- Website: [scenictrail.ch Scenic Trail]

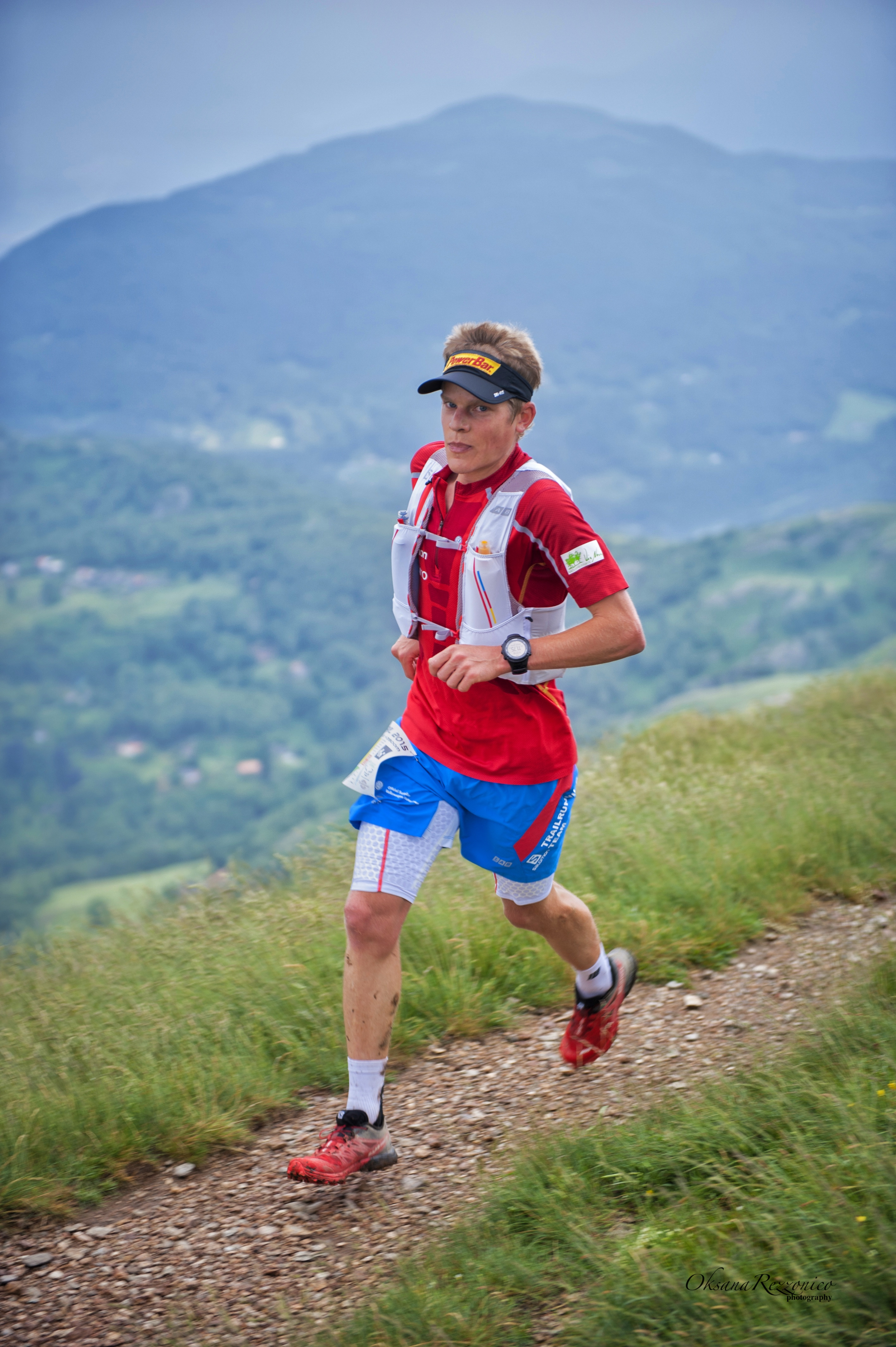
The three-time winner of the race Stephan Hugenschmidt in 2015.

The Scenic Trail is an international skyrunning competition held for the first time in 2013. It runs every year in Lugano (Switzerland) in June. The race was valid in 2017 for the Skyrunner World Series.

== Races ==
- Scenic Trail M100 Hyper, an Ultra SkyMarathon (167 km / 11,560 m vertical climb)
- Scenic Trail K113 Ultra, an Ultra SkyMarathon (119 km / 7,600 m vertical climb)
- Scenic Trail K54 Trail, a SkyMarathon (54 km / 3,650 m vertical climb)
- Scenic Trail K27 Skyrunning, a SkyRace (27 km / 2,200 m vertical climb)
- Scenic Trail K18 Walking, a not competitive mini SkyRace (18 km / 1150 m vertical climb)
- Scenic Trail K4 VK, a Vertical Kilometer (4.5 km / 880 m vertical climb)

== Results ==
Race of Skyrunner World Series

K113 Ultra
Year	Men's winner	Time	Women's winner	Time
2017	(Germany) Stephan Hugenschmidt (Germany) Matthias Dippacher	15:40:44	(Italy) Francesca Canepa	19:12:18

K54 Trail
Year	Men's winner	Time	Women's winner	Time
2014	(Switzerland) Marco Gazzola	5h48'01"	(Italy) Arianna Regis	7h15'22"
2015	(Germany) Stephan Hugenschmidt	5h45'44"	(Italy) Francesca Canepa (Switzerland) Korinne Kaegerer	7h31'41"
2016	(Germany) Stephan Hugenschmidt	5h57'35"	(Switzerland) Kathrin Goetz	7h10'43"
2017	(Switzerland) Adrian Brennwald	5h59'07"	(Switzerland) Vera Nina Schneebeli	7h56'17"

K27 Skyrunning
Year	Men's winner	Time	Women's winner	Time
2015 (24k)	(Italy) Alessio Rigamonti	2h59'03"	(Italy) Carla Corti	3h35'05"
2016 (24k)	(Italy) Cristian Minoggio	2h34'00"	(France) Jessica Pardin	3h04'05"
2017	(Switzerland) Aurelien Patoz	2h55'46"	(Switzerland) Andrea Vlasakova	3h23'30"

K4 VK
Year	Men's winner	Time	Women's winner	Time
2016	(Switzerland) Lukas Oehen	38'14"	(Italy) Serena Vittori	46'00"
2017	(Switzerland) Lukas Oehen	38'07"	(Switzerland) Susanna Serafini	46'50"

== See also ==
- Skyrunner World Series
