= International Trail Running Association =

Sports organisation for trail running

- Formation: 1 August 2013; 13 years ago
- Type: Sports federation
- Headquarters: (Switzerland) Lausanne
- Website: itra.run

International Trail Running Association (ITRA), often stylised as iTRA, is the governing body for trail running. It was formed in 2013, emerging from the 1st International Trail Running Conference held in 2012. Trail running was first recognised by the International Association of Athletics Federations (now World Athletics) in 2015 as a discipline of athletics. ITRA has, among other things, developed a points system for ranking the difficulty of specific trail routes and tracking the performance of runners across races.

The first General Assembly was held on 3 March 2015 in Paris. The ITRA aimed to become the international reference organization for trail running and hoped that the International Association of Athletics Federations (IAAF, now World Athletics) would recognize trail running as a separate discipline and the ITRA as its representative body. In 2015, during its Congress in Beijing, the IAAF officially included trail running as a discipline.

Since 2022 ITRA has been one of three lead organisations alongside the World Mountain Running Association and the International Association of Ultrarunners for the World Mountain and Trail Running Championships, an event which is sanctioned by World Athletics. The WMTRC incorporates 4 trail races a Men's and Women's Short Trail held over a distance of 35-45km with no less than 1,500m of elevation gain, and a Men's and Women's Long Trail over a distance of between 75-85km.

ITRA is currently headed by Janet Ng, a co-founder of the Hong Kong Trail Running Association.

== See also ==
- International Association of Ultrarunners (IAU)
