= Charles Mountfort =

New Zealand surveyor

Charles Adnam Mountfort (9 February 1854 – 11 May 1941) was a notable New Zealand surveyor. He was born in Christchurch, New Zealand on 9 February 1854. He was the nephew of noted architect Benjamin Mountfort.

Mountfort died at Feilding on 11 May 1941, and was buried at Feilding Cemetery.
