= Vajin Armstrong =

New Zealand ultramarthon runner

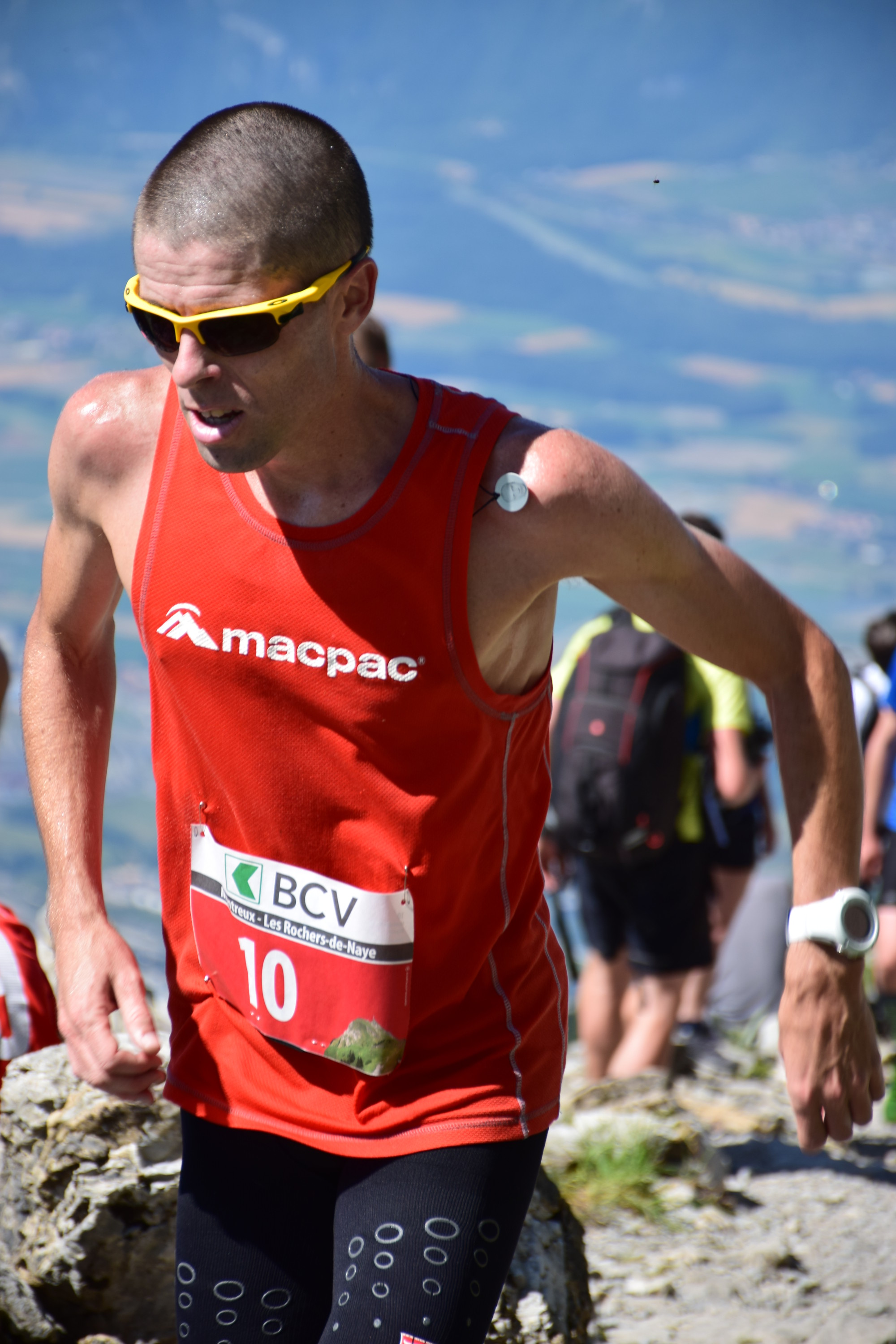

Personal information
- Full name: Vajin Armstrong
- Nationality: New Zealander
- Born: 12 May 1980 (age 46)

Vajin Armstrong (born Luke Armstrong; 12 May 1980) is an ultra-distance runner from Christchurch, New Zealand. Armstrong is a disciple of Sri Chinmoy.

== Races and results ==
- 2010–2012 Kepler Challenge, 1st
- 2012 American River 1st
- 2013 Swiss Alpine Marathon, 2nd
- 2013 Zugspitz Ultra Trail, 2nd
- 2014 Bedrock50 Ultra, 1st
- 2014 Buffalo Stampede Marathon, 1st
- 2015 Two Bays 56 km Trail Run, 1st
- 2016 Swiss Alpine Marathon, Davos, 1st
