= Trail running =

Mountain sport

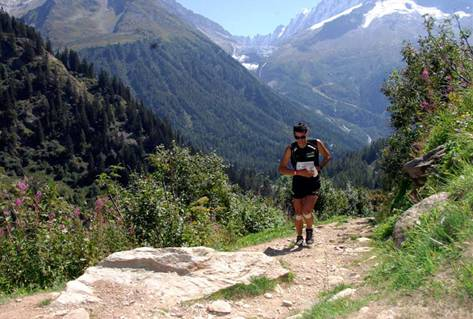
Kilian Jornet, during his winning run at the 2008 Ultra-Trail du Mont-Blanc

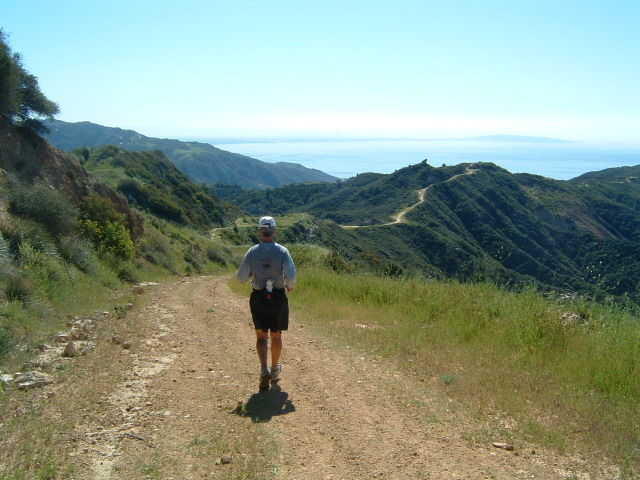
The Backbone Trail, Santa Monica Mountains, southern California

Trail running is a type of running that takes place on outdoor trails, often in mountainous terrain, and often includes significant ascents and descents.

It is similar to both mountain and fell running (also known as hill running). Unlike road running and track running, it generally takes place on outdoor trails, often in mountainous terrain, and often includes significant ascents and descents. It is difficult to definitively distinguish trail running from cross country running. In general, however, cross country running is a discipline governed by World Athletics, which is typically raced over shorter distances.

Runners often cite less impact stress compared to road running, as well as the landscape and non-urban environment, as primary reasons for preferring trail running. This move to nature is also reflected in a large increase in competitors in non-traditional/off-road triathlons and adventure racing in the 2010s.

In 2013 International Trail Running Association (ITRA) was formed to promote trail running. ITRA's Performance Index and WMRA world ranking are used to rank runner's performances.

== Equipment ==
When comparing a trail-running shoe to a road-running shoe, trail-running shoes are built for more rugged terrain. They have noticeably thicker outsoles allowing for better traction on the trails and stiffer midsoles for support on uneven and rocky surfaces. Other features like added heel and toe protection and waterproof technologies are also found in trail shoes.

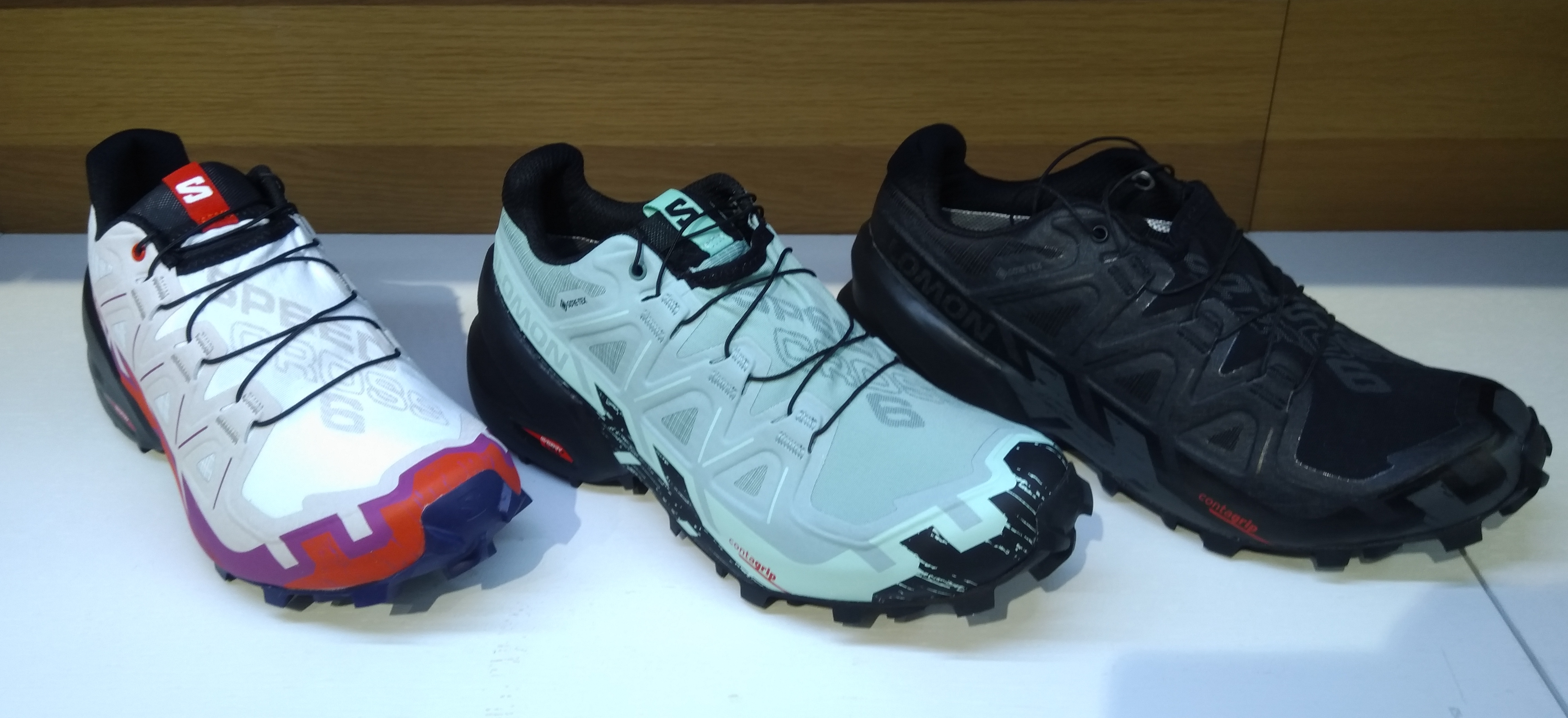
Trail shoes with toe protection and more tread than road shoes.

Trail-running gear can vary depending on specific trail and weather conditions but can include wicking garments, water bottles, sunscreen, sunglasses, hats, gaiters, insect repellent spray, headlamps, headphones, and ivy block. Some trail runners attach lightweight crampons to the bottom of their shoes to aid with traction in the snow and on ice. Ultra-light hiking poles or trekking poles can be used to increase speed and stability. Water may be stored inside a hydration bladder with a drinking tube, carried in a backpack, waist pack, or hydration pack.

== Races ==
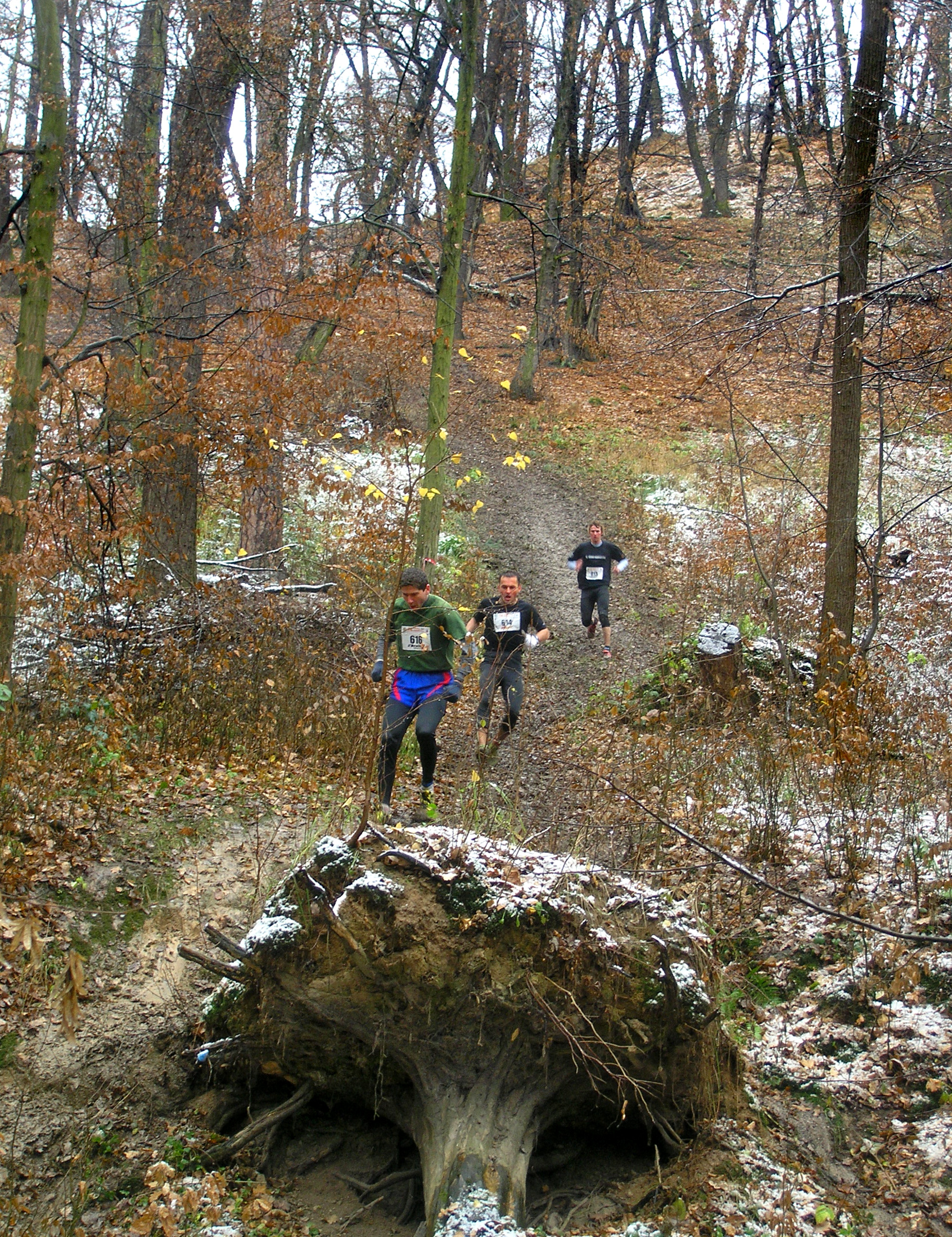
A hill-running race in Prague

Trail running races are organized globally and vary in distance, terrain, and vertical climb. For example, in the United States, the American Trail Running Association was only founded in 1996 to represent trail races in the US. In the United Kingdom, the Trail Running Association was formed in 1991. The International Trail Running Association (ITRA) was founded in 2013, and was first recognized by the IAAF in 2015. In 2025, Sophie Power launched a series of women-only trail races in the UK.

Distances in races vary widely, from 5 km, to over 100 miles (161 km). Many trail races are of ultramarathon distance. Races of similar distances often differ significantly in terms of terrain, which makes it difficult to compare performance across different courses. This is in contrast to times over standard distances in road running, such as 10 km or marathon.

The International Triathlon Union conducts an annual Cross Triathlon World Championship race. Additionally, the XTERRA Triathlon is a private off-road series that concludes with a championship each year in Maui.

== Aid stations ==
Aid stations are physical checkpoints commonly located every 5 to 10 kilometers along the course. Ultramarathon aid stations are often stocked with foods that provide runners with quickly digestible sugars that can provide a needed boost as their glycogen levels begin to drop. Most trail races only have a single stage, where competitors are timed over the entire duration of their run, including stops at aid stations. However, trail running stage races also exist. These multiday-stage races usually offer complete support and runner amenities between stages. There are, however, stage races that provide no support apart from water and medical aid, and require competitors to carry all their equipment (food, sleeping bag, change of clothes, compass). The best-known example of such races is the Marathon des Sables, which was first held in 1986.

== Participation limitations ==
Compared to road races, there are often fewer participants as the number of entries is often limited. There can be a few reasons for this: narrowness of trails, national parks (where the courses are often set) may limit the number of participants via a permitting process, safety, and environmental concerns. There are many popular races such as the Ultra-Trail du Mont-Blanc in Europe or the Western States Endurance Run in the United States that have been forced to limit entries due to overwhelming demand.

Additionally, runners may be expected to behave in sportsmanlike ways that increase access and enjoyment for all participants. These actions can include yielding to uphill traffic, staying on established trails, passing on the left (United States), staying single file, and yielding to fast runners.

Some notable trail races include:

=== Africa ===
- Fish River Canyon Ultra Marathon
- Kalahari Augrabies Extreme Marathon
- Mount Cameroon Race of Hope
- Rhodes Trail Run

=== Asia ===
- 9 Dragons: Hong Kong, 50 km 100 km
- Coast To Coast Night Trail Ultra: Indonesia, since 2015
- Japan Mountain Endurance Race Hasegawa Tsuneo Cup (HASETSUNE CUP): 71.5 km (since 1993)
- Trans Japan Alps Race (TJAR): 415 km (since 2002)
- Ultra-Trail Mount Fuji (UTMF): 161 km (since 2012)

=== Europe ===
- Fruškogorski maraton: 125 kilometres (78 mi) (since 1978)
- Scenic Trail: 167 kilometres (104 mi)
- Tatry Running Tour
- Tor des Géants: 330 kilometres (210 mi)
- Transvulcania: 83 kilometres (52 mi)
- Ultra-Trail du Mont-Blanc: 174 kilometres (108 mi)
- Zugspitz Ultratrail 101 kilometres (63 mi) since 2011

=== North America ===
- Barkley Marathons: 100 miles (160 km)
- Bear 100 Mile Endurance Run: 100 miles (160 km)
- Dipsea Race: 7.5 miles (12.1 km) the oldest trail running event in the US
- Hardrock Hundred Mile Endurance Run: 100 miles (160 km)
- Leadville Trail 100: 100 miles (160 km)
- Western States Endurance Run: 100 miles (160 km)

=== Oceania ===
- Kepler Challenge: 60 kilometres (37 mi) also includes the Luxmore Grunt 28 kilometres (17 mi) (New Zealand)
- Kokoda Challenge Race: 96 kilometres (60 mi)

== Related activities ==
=== Fastpacking ===
A growing number of people are participating in solo backcountry trail running trips, carrying an ultralight form of backpacking to allow faster speeds than with a traditional backpack. Running while backpacking has been termed "fastpacking". These trips can be both difficult and dangerous, depending on length, weather, and terrain.

=== Mountain and fell running ===
Mountain and fell running (also called hill running, particularly in Scotland) are sports that combine running and racing off-road over the upland country, where the gradient climbed is a significant component. Fell is a dialect word from the northwest of England where it is popular–especially in the Lake District. Fell races require mountain navigation skills and participants carry survival equipment. Unlike trail running, the routes of fell races are often unmarked so that competitors frequently are able to choose their own route to a checkpoint.

The only difference between mountain running and trail running is that a mountain running course sometimes includes paving. It is different from fell running because (1) courses are clearly marked and avoid dangerous sections; and (2) while mountain running takes place mainly off-road, if there is significant elevation gain on the route, surfaced roads may be used.

== See also ==
- Hillwalking
- IAU Trail World Championships
- List of shoe styles
- Skyrunning
- Cross-country running
