= 2021 World Mountain and Trail Running Championships =

- Dates: November 4–6, 2022
- Host city: Chiang Mai, Thailand
- Level: Senior, Junior
- Type: Outdoor
- Events: 10 (men: 4; women: 4) (U20 boys: 1; U20 girls: 1)

The 2021 World Mountain and Trail Running Championships (abbreviated WMTRC 2021) was an inaugural event which combined the World Mountain Running Championships and IAU Trail World Championships into a new competition, the World Mountain and Trail Running Championships. The event was organised by the World Mountain Running Association, International Trail Running Association and International Association of Ultrarunners sanctioned by World Athletics. It was held in Chiang Mai, Thailand, from November 4–6, 2022.

== Schedule ==
Although the WMTRC 2021 was originally scheduled to be held during November 11–14, 2021, it was postponed to November 2022 due to the COVID-19 pandemic.

The schedule is as follows.

- Friday, November 4 – 10:15 am – VERTICAL MOUNTAIN (8500 m (27,887 ft 1 1/2 in), 1065 m (3,494 ft 1 in) vertical) race, from the Chiang Mai International Exhibition and Convention Centre to Khun Chang Khian village.
- Saturday, November 5 – 6:30 am – 80000 m (262,467 ft 2 1/4 in) TRAIL (5400 m (17,716 ft 6 1/4 in) meters vertical) race, from the Chiang Mai International Exhibition and Convention Centre to Khun Chang Khian village, Doi Pui, and back down.
- Saturday, November 5 – 7:30 am – 40000 m (131,233 ft 7 in) TRAIL (2900 m (9,514 ft 5 in) meters vertical) race, from the Chiang Mai International Exhibition and Convention Centre to Khun Chang Khian village, down to Huay Tung Tao reservoir, up to Khun Chang Khian village and back down to the convention centre.
- Sunday, November 6 – 8:30 am – 11200 m (36,745 ft 4 3/4 in) CLASSIC MOUNTAIN (550 m (1,804 ft 5 1/2 in) meters vertical) up and down races.
- Sunday, November 6 – 8:30 am – 6500 m (21,325 ft 5 1/2 in) CLASSIC MOUNTAIN (275 m (902 ft 2 3/4 in) meters vertical) up and down races.

== Medal summary ==
=== Medal table ===
* Host nation (Thailand)

Rank	Nation	Gold	Silver	Bronze	Total
1	Uganda	5	2	2	9
2	United States	4	1	2	7
3	France	2	4	1	7
4	Great Britain	2	3	4	9
5	Italy	2	2	4	8
6	Spain	1	2	4	7
7	Kenya	1	2	0	3
8	Switzerland	1	1	2	4
9	Norway	1	0	0	1
9	Romania	1	0	0	1
11	Sweden	0	1	1	2
12	Austria	0	1	0	1
12	Czech Republic	0	1	0	1
Totals (13 entries)		20	20	20	60

=== Men's events ===
Results for men's events:

Event	Gold		Silver		Bronze	
Uphill mountain race	Patrick Kipngeno; Kenya	46:51	Philemon Kiriago; Kenya	48:24	Alejandro García Carrillo; Spain	49:03
Team uphill race	Italy; Cesare Maestri; Xavier Chevrier; Andrea Rostan	32pts	Switzerland; Joey Hadorn; Jonas Soldini; Fabian Aebersold	34pts	Spain; Alejandro García Carrillo; Miquel Corbera Rubio; Oriol Cardona Coll	37pts
Short trail	Stian Hovind Angermund; Norway	3:08.29	Francesco Puppi; Italy	3:11.47	Jonathan Albon; Great Britain	3:13.05
Team short trail	Italy; Francesco Puppi; Andrea Rota; Christian Minoggio	9:53.39	France; Thomas Cardin; Frederic Tranchand; Julien Rancon	10:05.50	United Kingdom; Jonathan Albon; Kristian Jones; Billy Cartwright	10:07.16
Long trail	Adam Peterman; United States	7:15.53	Nicolas Martin; France	7:28.44	Andreas Reiterer; Italy	7:36.50
Team long trail	United States; Adam Peterman; Eric Lipuma; Jeff Colt	23:06.27	France; Nicolas Martin; Thibaut Garrivier; Paul Mathou	23:12.41	Spain; José Ángel Fernańdez Jiménez; Aritz Egea Cáceres; Marcos Ramos González	23:42.54
Up and Downhill mountain race	Samuel Kibet; Uganda	40:02	Patrick Kipngeno; Kenya	40:12	Timothy Toroitich; Uganda	40:26
Team up and downhill race	Uganda; Samuel Kibet; Timothy Toroitich; Leonard Chemonges	8pts	Spain; Andreu Blanes Reig; Oriol Cardona Coll; Alejandro García Castillo	29pts	Italy; Alberto Vender; Cesare Maestri; Xavier Chevrier	30pts
6.5 km U20 mountain race	Leonard Chemutai; Uganda	21:07	Caleb Arap Musobo Tungwet; Uganda	21:44	Denis Kiplangat; Uganda	22:18
Team 6.5 km U20 mountain race	Uganda; Leonard Chemutai; Caleb Arap Musobo Tungwet; Denis Kiplanga	6pts	France; Baptiste Cartieaux; Pierre Boudy; Mélaine Le Palabe	33.5pts	United Kingdom; Finlay Grant; Fraser Gilmour; William Longden	34pts

=== Women's events ===
Event	Gold		Silver		Bronze	
Uphill mountain race	Allie McLaughlin; United States	55:15	Andrea Mayr; Austria	55:41	Maude Mathys; Switzerland	56:00
Team uphill race	United States; Allie McLaughlin; Lauren Gregory; Rachel Tomajczyk	39pts	United Kingdom; Scout Adkin; Ruth Jones; Holly Page	41pts	Switzerland; Maude Mathys; Judith Wyder; Selina Burch	41pts
Short trail	Denisa Ionela Dragomir; Romania	3:49.23	Barbora Macurova; Czech Republic	3:51.22	Emilia Brangefält; Sweden	3:54.52
Team short trail	Spain; Nuria Gil Clapera; Sheila Aviles Castaño; Julia Font Gómez	11:55.44	United States; Kimber Mattox; Ashley Brasovan; Stevie Kremer	12:08.39	United Kingdom; Eleanor Davis; Sharon Taylor; Nichola Jackson	12:10.30
Long trail	Blondine Lhirondel; France	8:22.14	Ida Nilsson; Sweden	8:34.59	Gemma Arenas Alcázar; Spain	8:46.27
Team long trail	France; Blandine Lhirondel; Audrey Tanguy; Marion Delespierre	26:06.06	Spain; Gemma Arenas Alcázar; Maite Mayorga Elizondo; Marta Molist Codina	26:53.19	Italy; Giuditta Turini; Camilla Spagnol; Alessandra Boifava	28:06.06
Up and downhill mountain race	Rebecca Cheptegei; Uganda	46:25	Annet Chemengich Chelangat; Uganda	46:52	Allie McLoughlin; United States	48:31
Team up and downhill race	Switzerland; Maude Mathys; Judith Wyder; Rea Iseli	34pts	United Kingdom; Scout Adkin; Holly Page; Naomi Lang	38pts	United States; Allie McLaughlin; Corey Dowe; Rachel Tomajczyk	45pts
6.5 km U20 mountain race	Jess Bailey; Great Britain	26:27	Rebecca Flaherty; Great Britain	27:45	Axelle Vicari; Italy	28:21
Team 6.5 km U20 mountain race	United Kingdom; Jess Bailey; Rebecca Flaherty; Ellen Weir	7pts	Italy; Axelle Vicari; Anna Hofer; Emily Vucemillo	18.5pts	France; Lili Anne Beck; Pauline Trocellier; Nélie Clement	29pts

== Results ==
=== 2022 World Mountain Running Championships Uphill Men's Results ===
Rank	Name	Nationality	Time	Notes
1	Patrick Kipngeno	Kenya	46:51	a
2	Philemon Kiriago	Kenya	48:24	a
3	Alejandro Garcia Carrillo	Spain	49:03	
4	Joey Hadorn	Switzerland	49:09	
5	Zak Hanna	Ireland	49:32	
6	Joseph Gray	United States	49:39	
7	Cesare Maestri	Italy	49:45	
8	Xavier Chevrier	Italy	50:03	
9	Marek Chrascina	Czech Republic	50:03	
10	Alexandre Ricard	Canada	50:04	
11	Johan Bugge	Norway	50:06	
12	Jonas Soldini	Switzerland	50:31	
13	Miquel Corbera Rubio	Spain	50:49	
14	Remi Leroux	Canada	50:56	
15	Chris Richards	United Kingdom	51:04	
16	Joe Steward	United Kingdom	51:06	
17	Andrea Rostan	Italy	51:28	
18	Fabian Aebersold	Switzerland	51:38	
19	Jáchym Kovář	Czech Republic	51:41	
20	Cameron Smith	United States	52:07	
21	Oriol Cardona Coll	Spain	52:12	
22	Jacob Adkin	United Kingdom	52:23	
23	Halfdan-Emil Færø	Norway	52:29	
24	Daniel Curts	United States	52:42	
25	Viktor Šinágl	Czech Republic	52:45	
26	Pascal Buchs	Switzerland	53:15	
27	Toru Miyahara	Japan	53:29	
28	Henri Aymonod	Italy	53:43	
29	Thibault Triaille	Belgium	53:47	
30	Maximilien Drion Du Chapois	Belgium	53:51	
31	Juan Ignacio Redolatti	Argentina	53:55	
32	Rui Muga	Portugal	54:31	
33	José Carvalho	Portugal	54:57	
34	Diego Ignacio Diaz Inostroza	Chile	54:59	
35	Øyvind Heiberg Sundby	Norway	55:21	
36	Guillermo Albert Lizandra	Spain	56:06	
37	Kristopher Swanson	Canada	57:27	
38	Gabriel Halans Muñoz Flores	Chile	57:35	
39	Hugo Felipe Contreras Campos	Chile	58:15	
40	Toby Bachelor	New Zealand	58:19	
41	Daniel Haworth	United Kingdom	58:51	
42	Oscar Basantes	Ecuador	58:54	
43	Paulo Macedo	Portugal	58:58	
44	Michael Sutton	New Zealand	59:02	
45	Jeremy Hunt	Australia	59:21	
46	Matias Ramon Espejo	Argentina	59:40	
47	Shaun Stephens-Whale	Canada	1:01:07	
48	Kevin Dure	Argentina	1:01:29	
49	Tiago Pereira	Portugal	1:01:38	
50	Jack Powell	Australia	1:01:47	
51	Sanchai Namkhet	Thailand	1:02:08	
52	James Minto	Australia	1:02:10	
53	Mark Bourne	Australia	1:02:53	
54	Ryunosuke Omi	Japan	1:03:28	
55	Juan Manuel Sanchez Quiroga	Argentina	1:04:50	
56	Boonthung Srisang	Thailand	1:07:09	
57	Soda Arthit	Thailand	1:09:43	
58	Gaetan Piette	Belgium	1:37:08	
DNF	Jasper Boot	Netherlands	DNF	
DNS	Joel Ayeko	Uganda	DNS	B
DNS	Leonard Chemonges	Uganda	DNS	B
DNS	Victor Kwemboi	Uganda	DNS	B
DNS	Caleb Arap Tungwet	Uganda	DNS	B
DNS	Dejan Angeloski	North Macedonia	DNS	

- a: Kenyan athletes missed the race call-time but were given leniency by the race organisers.
- b: Uganda athletes missed the start after accidentally travelling to finish of the course at the top of the mountain.

=== 2022 World Mountain Running Championships Uphill Men's Team Standings ===
Rank	Country	Racers	Score
1.	Italy	7 Cesare Maestri; 8 Xavier Chevrier; 17 Andrea Rostan	32 pts
2.	Switzerland	4 Joey Hadorn; 12 Jonas Soldini; 18 Fabian Aebersold	34 pts
3.	Spain	3 Alejandro Garcia Carrillo; 13 Miquel Corbera Rubio; 21 Oriol Cardona Coll	37 pts
4.	United States	6 Joseph Gray; 20 Cameron Smith; 24 Daniel Curts	50 pts
5.	United Kingdom	15 Chris Richards; 16 Joe Steward; 22 Jacob Adkin	53 pts
6.	Czech Republic	9 Marek Chrascina; 19 Jáchym Kovář; 25 Viktor Šinágl	53 pts
7.	Canada	10 Alexandre Ricard; 14 Remi Leroux; 37 Kristopher Swanson	61 pts
8.	Norway	11 Johan Bugge; 23 Halfdan-Emil Færø; 35 Øyvind Heiberg Sundby	69 pts
9.	Portugal	32 Rui Muga; 33 José Carvalho; 43 Paulo Macedo	108 pts
10.	Chile	34 Diego Ignacio Diaz Inostroza; 38 Gabriel Halans Muñoz Flores; 39 Hugo Felipe Contreras Campos	111 pts
11.	Belgium	29 Thibault Triaille; 30 Maximilien Drion Du Chapois; 58 Gaetan Piette	117 pts
12.	Argentina	31 Juan Ignacio Redolatti; 46 Matias Ramon Espejo; 48 Kevin Dure	125 pts
13.	Australia	45 Jeremy Hunt; 50 Jack Powell; 52 James Minto	147 pts
14.	Thailand	51 Sanchai Namkhet; 56 Boonthung Srisang; 57 Soda Arthit	164 pts

=== 2022 Trail World Championships 40k Men's Results ===
Rank	Name	Nationality	Time
1	Stian Hovind-Angermund	Norway	3:08:29
2	Francesco Puppi	Italy	3:11:47
3	Jonathan Albon	United Kingdom	3:13:05
4	Max King	United States	3:17:31
5	Kristian Jones	United Kingdom	3:17:47
6	Thomas Cardin	France	3:19:31
7	Andrea Rota	Italy	3:19:56
8	Bogdan Damian	Romania	3:19:59
9	Antonio Martinez Perez	Spain	3:21:35
10	Christian Minoggio	Italy	3:21:57
11	Leonard Albert Mitrică	Romania	3:22:12
12	Frédéric Tranchand	France	3:22:20
13	Julien Rancon	France	3:24:02
14	Zaid Ait Malek Oulkis	Spain	3:25:52
15	Timothée Bommier	France	3:27:45
16	Moises Martinez	Mexico	3:28:46
17	Kévin Vermeulen	France	3:29:39
18	Mattia Gianola	Italy	3:30:10
19	Diego Ramon Simon	Argentina	3:31:07
20	Joaquin Narvaez	Argentina	3:31:32
21	Martin Dematteis	Italy	3:32:05
22	Noah Williams	United States	3:33:21
23	Zach Miller	United States	3:34:06
24	Tomáš Křivohlávek	Czech Republic	3:35:07
25	Billy Cartwright	United Kingdom	3:36:26
26	Ricardo Cherta Ballester	Spain	3:37:08
27	Vít Pavlišta	Czech Republic	3:37:13
28	Pedro Barros	Portugal	3:38:29
29	Matěj Zima	Czech Republic	3:39:15
30	Cristian Marian Moșoiu	Romania	3:39:32
31	Roberto Delorenzi	Switzerland	3:39:40
32	Vladislav Ixel	Australia	3:39:46
33	Jeffrey Campbell	Canada	3:40:06
34	Arnaud Bonin	France	3:40:44
35	Helio Fumo	Portugal	3:40:57
36	Juho Ylinen	Finland	3:41:57
37	Ruedi Becker	Switzerland	3:42:57
38	Nicolas Ignacio Benavides Bohie	Chile	3:43:25
39	Joseph Demoor	United States	3:45:04
40	Jonathan Aziz	United States	3:45:45
41	Ezequiel Alexis Pauluzak	Argentina	3:46:38
42	Brennan Townshend	United Kingdom	3:46:48
43	Bruno Silva	Portugal	3:47:23
44	Raul Ortiz Cabello	Spain	3:48:21
45	Max Boderskov	Denmark	3:53:59
46	Thomas Adams	United Kingdom	3:54:21
47	Juan Esteban Las Peñas Romano	Argentina	3:56:31
48	Gaston Nicolas Cambareri	Argentina	3:57:50
49	Kok Wai Tse	Hong Kong	3:58:12
50	Luca Cagnati	Italy	4:00:28
51	John Ray Galutera Onifa	Philippines	4:00:56
52	Aidan Hobbs	Australia	4:01:41
53	Toms Komass	Latvia	4:03:54
54	Alin Ionuț Zincă	Romania	4:06:43
55	Rui Ueda	Japan	4:07:07
56	Fuk Cheung Tsang	Hong Kong	4:11:24
57	Louis Liraud Flore	Mauritius	4:13:09
58	Ryan Carr	New Zealand	4:13:37
59	Calum Neff	Canada	4:14:32
60	John Ellis	Australia	4:14:40
61	Andreas Rois	Austria	4:18:15
62	Tanapong Chankrachang	Thailand	4:19:41
63	Mathieu Leng	Cambodia	4:23:11
64	Sampathkumar Subramanian	India	4:23:40
65	Louis Renaldo Zoe Thomas	Mauritius	4:24:29
66	Dany Racine	Canada	4:31:01
67	Halldor Hermann Jonsson	Iceland	4:31:57
68	Madeo Ittoo	Mauritius	4:31:59
69	Patikarn Pechsricha	Thailand	4:32:10
70	Nicholas Muxlow	Australia	4:34:11
71	Justinas Vaižmužys	Lithuania	4:34:40
72	Thorolfur Ingi Thorsson	Iceland	4:36:24
73	Phattharaphon Noimor	Thailand	4:36:53
74	Alvis Danovskis	Latvia	4:37:26
75	Romain Fabien Bayol	Mauritius	4:37:37
76	Putra Katume Ade	Indonesia	4:37:44
77	Kieren Dsouza	India	4:43:24
78	Gustin Bin Thiam	Malaysia	4:46:45
79	Kittipat Chotchindakun	Thailand	4:50:17
80	Marius Dijokas	Lithuania	4:56:12
81	Surasak Somboon	Thailand	4:57:12
82	Narathip Chanwang	Thailand	4:59:33
83	Simonas Bartkus	Lithuania	6:19:14
84	Jean-Jacques Mok	Cambodia	6:36:30
DNF	Sebastian Ljungdahl	Sweden	DNF
DNS	Oriol Cardona Coll	Spain	DNS
DNS	Miguel Angel Garcia	Mexico	DNS
DNS	Dário Moitoso	Portugal	DNS
DNS	Martin Anthamatten	Switzerland	DNS
DNS	Daniel Curts	United States	DNS
DNS	Cameron Smith	United States	DNS

=== 2022 Trail World Championships 40k Men's Team Standings ===
Rank	Country	Racers	Score
1.	Italy	3:11:47 Francesco Puppi; 3:19:56 Andrea Rota; 3:21:57 Christian Minoggio	9:53:39
2.	France	3:19:31 Thomas Cardin; 3:22:20 Frédéric Tranchand; 3:24:02 Julien Rancon	10:05:50
3.	United Kingdom	3:13:05 Jonathan Albon; 3:17:47 Kristian Jones; 3:36:26 Billy Cartwright	10:07:16
4.	Romania	3:19:59 Bogdan Damian; 3:22:12 Leonard Albert Mitrică; 3:39:32 Cristian Marian Moșoiu	10:21:42
5.	Spain	3:21:35 Antonio Martinez Perez; 3:25:52 Zaid Ait Malek Oulkis; 3:37:08 Ricardo Cherta Ballester	10:24:33
6.	United States	3:17:31 Max King; 3:33:21 Noah Williams; 3:34:06 Zach Miller	10:24:56
7.	Argentina	3:31:07 Diego Ramon Simon; 3:31:32 Joaquin Narvaez; 3:46:38 Ezequiel Alexis Pauluzak	10:49:16
8.	Czech Republic	3:35:07 Tomáš Křivohlávek; 3:37:13 Vít Pavlišta; 3:39:15 Matěj Zima	10:51:34
9.	Portugal	3:38:29 Pedro Barros; 3:40:57 Helio Fumo; 3:47:23 Bruno Silva	11:06:47
10.	Australia	3:39:46 Vladislav Ixel; 4:01:41 Aidan Hobbs; 4:14:40 John Ellis	11:56:05
11.	Canada	3:40:06 Jeffrey Campbell; 4:14:32 Calum Neff; 4:31:01 Dany Racine	12:25:38
12.	Mauritius	4:13:09 Louis Liraud Flore; 4:24:29 Louis Renaldo Zoe Thomas; 4:31:59 Madeo Ittoo	13:09:35
13.	Thailand	4:19:41 Tanapong Chankrachang; 4:32:10 Patikarn Pechsricha; 4:36:53 Phattharaphon Noimor	13:28:42
14.	Lithuania	4:34:40 Justinas Vaižmužys; 4:56:12 Marius Dijokas; 6:19:14 Simonas Bartkus	15:50:05

=== 2022 Trail World Championships 80k Men's Results ===
Rank	Name	Nationality	Time
1	Adam Peterman	United States	7:15:53
2	Nicolas Martin	France	7:28:44
3	Andreas Reiterer	Italy	7:36:50
4	Jose Angel Fernandez Jimenez	Spain	7:39:19
5	Aritz Egea Caceres	Spain	7:48:42
6	Thibaut Garrivier	France	7:50:12
7	Eric Lipuma	United States	7:52:13
8	Peter Fraňo	Slovakia	7:53:06
9	Didrik Grytbak Hermansen	Norway	7:53:42
10	Paul Mathou	France	7:53:47
11	Harry Jones	United Kingdom	7:54:10
12	Ramon Manetsch	Switzerland	7:55:18
13	Raul Octavian Butaci	Romania	7:57:34
14	Jeff Colt	United States	7:58:23
15	Martin Kern	France	7:59:53
16	Yuya Kawasaki	Japan	8:01:17
17	Davide Cheraz	Italy	8:03:48
18	Benedikt Hoffmann	Germany	8:07:16
19	Andrei Preda	Romania	8:08:13
20	Riccardo Montani	Italy	8:09:11
21	Hirokazu Nishimura	Japan	8:11:11
22	Simen Hjalmar Wästlund	Sweden	8:11:54
23	Marcos Ramos Gonzalez	Spain	8:14:55
24	Ludovic Pommeret	France	8:16:50
25	Francesco Cucco	Italy	8:17:39
26	Kamil Leśniak	Poland	8:21:06
27	Mads Louring	Denmark	8:23:15
28	Arthur Joyeux Bouillon	France	8:26:07
29	Martin Lustenberger	Switzerland	8:26:49
30	Miguel Arsénio	Portugal	8:28:36
31	Jean-Philippe Thibodeau	Canada	8:30:04
32	Ho Chung Wong	Hong Kong	8:31:00
33	Yutaro Yokouchi	Japan	8:32:39
34	George Foster	United Kingdom	8:34:19
35	Anders Johnny Kjærevik	Norway	8:35:18
36	Paweł Czerniak	Poland	8:35:31
37	Matteo Anselmi	Italy	8:35:46
38	Tom Erik Halvorsen	Norway	8:37:06
39	Ryan Smith	United Kingdom	8:38:38
40	Patrick O'leary	Ireland	8:41:59
41	Satoru Suga	Japan	8:43:01
42	Thorbergur Ingi Jonsson	Iceland	8:45:47
43	Weston Hill	New Zealand	8:46:00
44	Kristian Joergensen	Denmark	8:46:56
45	Borja Fernandez Fernandez	Spain	8:47:36
46	Juuso Simpanen	Finland	8:48:03
47	Joshua Chugg	Australia	8:48:35
48	Jussi Nokelainen	Finland	8:49:34
49	Hugo Gonçalves	Portugal	8:49:52
50	Valentin Toma	Romania	8:54:19
51	Marián Priadka	Slovakia	8:58:22
52	Tomasz Skupień	Poland	9:02:15
53	Adam Merry	United States	9:02:42
54	Bruno Sousa	Portugal	9:03:08
55	Sebastian Krogvik	Norway	9:04:05
56	Matthew Crehan	Australia	9:12:22
57	David Jeker	Canada	9:13:19
58	Gvido Kalniņš	Latvia	9:13:30
59	Jesus Antonio Barroso Agüero	Argentina	9:13:36
60	Jantaraboon Kiangchaipaiphana	Thailand	9:14:50
61	Dwi Kurniawan Risqi	Indonesia	9:17:39
62	Franco Hernan Oro	Argentina	9:20:59
63	Henrik Westerlin	Denmark	9:23:26
64	Facundo Alejo Nuñer	Argentina	9:23:41
65	Jesper Meins	Denmark	9:28:23
66	Luis Efrain Urbina	Mexico	9:28:57
67	Alexander Olivo	Ecuador	9:31:03
68	Carlos Ferreira	Portugal	9:31:43
69	Luis Esteban Soto Ayamante	Chile	9:34:31
70	Oswaldo Yair Peredo	Mexico	9:34:42
71	Edvardas Moseika	Lithuania	9:40:46
72	Thorsteinn Roy Johannsson	Iceland	9:42:21
73	Atthapol Intajak	Thailand	9:43:14
74	Majell Backhausen	Australia	9:45:51
75	Krisada Thongjib	Thailand	9:46:29
76	Milton Amat	Malaysia	9:50:39
77	Laurynas Remeika	Lithuania	9:50:39
78	Luciano Pilatti	Argentina	9:56:59
79	Riccardo Borgialli	Italy	9:57:10
80	Oleksii Melnyk	Ukraine	10:04:25
81	Thomas Dade	Australia	10:13:05
82	Donatas Kojala	Lithuania	10:23:52
83	Sigurjon Ernir Sturluson	Iceland	10:34:14
84	Matīss Vecvagaris	Latvia	10:37:43
85	Yi-Lin Chung	Taiwan	10:53:43
86	Sanya Khanchai	Thailand	10:57:52
87	Matt Tribe	Canada	11:07:24
88	Wouter Verheyen	Belgium	11:27:01
89	Bogdan Onyschenko	Ukraine	11:40:34
90	Tsai-Tsung Chen	Taiwan	11:43:18
91	Yotchai Chaipromma	Thailand	12:07:39
92	Shih-Hsuan Chen	Taiwan	12:17:10
93	Ramūnas Grumbinas	Lithuania	12:19:47
94	Kristo Halme	Finland	12:20:20
95	Yen-Tsung Chen	Taiwan	12:22:54
96	Jia-Horng Gau	Taiwan	13:00:01
97	Elmir Askarov	Azerbaijan	13:15:59
98	Jean-Luc Puong	Cambodia	13:41:40
99	Richard Voilquin	Cambodia	14:33:22
100	Saroeun Kim	Cambodia	14:40:30
DNF	Tobias Dahl Fenre	Norway	DNF
DNS	Catalin Sorecau	Romania	DNS
DNS	Martin Anthamatten	Switzerland	DNS
DNS	Tom Evans	United Kingdom	DNS

=== 2022 Trail World Championships 80k Men's Team Standings ===
Rank	Country	Racers	Score
1.	United States	7:15:53 Adam Peterman; 7:52:13 Eric Lipuma; 7:58:23 Jeff Colt	23:06:29
2.	France	7:28:44 Nicolas Martin; 7:50:12 Thibaut Garrivier; 7:53:47 Paul Mathou	23:12:43
3.	Spain	7:39:19 Jose Angel Fernandez Jimenez; 7:48:42 Aritz Egea Caceres; 8:14:55 Marcos Ramos Gonzalez	23:42:56
4.	Italy	7:36:50 Andreas Reiterer; 8:03:48 Davide Cheraz; 8:09:11 Riccardo Montani	23:49:49
5.	Japan	8:01:17 Yuya Kawasaki; 8:11:11 Hirokazu Nishimura; 8:32:39 Yutaro Yokouchi	24:45:07
6.	Romania	7:57:34 Raul Octavian Butaci; 8:08:13 Andrei Preda; 8:54:19 Valentin Toma	25:00:06
7.	Norway	7:53:42 Didrik Grytbak Hermansen; 8:35:18 Anders Johnny Kjærevik; 8:37:06 Tom Erik Halvorsen	25:06:06
8.	United Kingdom	7:54:10 Harry Jones; 8:34:19 George Foster; 8:38:38 Ryan Smith	25:07:07
9.	Poland	8:21:06 Kamil Leśniak; 8:35:31 Paweł Czerniak; 9:02:15 Tomasz Skupień	25:58:52
10.	Portugal	8:28:36 Miguel Arsénio; 8:49:52 Hugo Gonçalves; 9:03:08 Bruno Sousa	26:21:36
11.	Denmark	8:23:15 Mads Louring; 8:46:56 Kristian Joergensen; 9:23:26 Henrik Westerlin	26:33:37
12.	Australia	8:48:35 Joshua Chugg; 9:12:22 Matthew Crehan; 9:45:51 Majell Backhausen	27:46:48
13.	Argentina	9:13:36 Jesus Antonio Barroso Agüero; 9:20:59 Franco Hernan Oro; 9:23:41 Facundo Alejo Nuñer	27:58:16
14.	Thailand	9:14:50 Jantaraboon Kiangchaipaiphana; 9:43:14 Atthapol Intajak; 9:46:29 Krisada Thongjib	28:44:33
15.	Canada	8:30:04 Jean-Philippe Thibodeau; 9:13:19 David Jeker; 11:07:24 Matt Tribe	28:50:47
16.	Iceland	8:45:47 Thorbergur Ingi Jonsson; 9:42:21 Thorsteinn Roy Johannsson; 10:34:14 Sigurjon Ernir Sturluson	29:02:22
17.	Lithuania	9:40:46 Edvardas Moseika; 9:50:39 Laurynas Remeika; 10:23:52 Donatas Kojala	29:55:17
18.	Finland	8:48:03 Juuso Simpanen; 8:49:34 Jussi Nokelainen; 12:20:20 Kristo Halme	29:57:57
19.	Chinese Taipei	10:53:43 Yi-Lin Chung; 11:43:18 Tsai-Tsung Chen; 12:17:10 Shih-Hsuan Chen	34:54:11
20.	Cambodia	13:41:40 Jean-Luc Puong; 14:33:22 Richard Voilquin; 14:40:30 Saroeun Kim	42:55:32

=== 2022 World Mountain Running Championships Men's Up & Downhill (11.2km) Results ===
Rank	Name	Nationality	Time
1	Samuel Kibet	Uganda	40:02
2	Patrick Kipngeno	Kenya	40:12
3	Timothy Toroitich	Uganda	40:26
4	Leonard Chemonges	Uganda	40:51
5	Eliud Cherop	Uganda	41:27
6	Andreu Blanes Reig	Spain	41:31
7	Alberto Vender	Italy	42:26
8	Oriol Cardona Coll	Spain	42:44
9	Cesare Maestri	Italy	42:47
10	Jáchym Kovář	Czech Republic	42:48
11	Marek Chrascina	Czech Republic	42:57
12	Théodore Klein	France	43:01
12	Joey Hadorn	Switzerland	43:01
14	Xavier Chevrier	Italy	43:16
15	Alejandro Garcia Carrillo	Spain	43:23
16	Daniel Curts	United States	43:35
17	Andrew Douglas	United Kingdom	43:39
18	Everardo Moreno	Mexico	43:41
19	Miquel Corbera Rubio	Spain	43:44
20	Halfdan-Emil Færø	Norway	43:54
20	Ross Gollan	United Kingdom	43:54
22	Viktor Šinágl	Czech Republic	43:58
23	Baptiste Fourmont	France	44:01
24	Chris Richards	United Kingdom	44:08
25	Jonas Soldini	Switzerland	44:10
26	David Santiago	Mexico	44:11
27	Maximilien Drion Du Chapois	Belgium	44:15
28	Alexander Chepelin	United Kingdom	44:22
29	Daniel Pattis	Italy	44:25
30	Alexandre Ricard	Canada	44:29
31	Killian Allaire	France	44:36
32	Remi Leroux	Canada	45:01
33	Toru Miyahara	Japan	45:08
33	Pascal Buchs	Switzerland	45:08
35	Fabian Aebersold	Switzerland	45:17
36	Cesar Daniel Gomez	Mexico	45:33
37	Andy Wacker	United States	45:45
38	Diego Ignacio Diaz Inostroza	Chile	45:58
39	Mason Coppi	United States	46:12
40	Leo Peterson	Australia	46:21
41	Carlos Lopes	Portugal	47:04
42	Morgan Elliott	United States	47:16
43	Gabriel Halans Muñoz Flores	Chile	47:26
44	Braian Burgos	Argentina	47:50
45	Johan Bugge	Norway	47:58
46	Oscar Basantes	Ecuador	48:04
47	Hugo Felipe Contreras Campos	Chile	48:05
48	Øyvind Heiberg Sundby	Norway	48:17
49	Thibault Triaille	Belgium	48:47
50	Ezequiel Antonio Lopez	Argentina	49:01
51	Yamato Yoshino	Japan	49:25
52	Nathan Pearce	Australia	49:34
53	Sanchai Namkhet	Thailand	49:36
54	Shaun Stephens-Whale	Canada	50:20
55	Nicolas Ignacio Benavides Bohie	Chile	52:12
56	Danchai Pankong	Thailand	53:19
57	Seksan Jakkaew	Thailand	54:34
58	Karn Aunreun	Thailand	1:00:03
59	Gaetan Piette	Belgium	1:03:54
60	Farrell Hedrick	Cambodia	1:10:30
61	Ammarith Ann	Cambodia	1:17:05
	Javier Adolfo Carriqueo	Argentina	DNF
	Nahuel Aurelio Luengo	Argentina	DNF
	Sylvain Cachard	France	DNF
	Philemon Kiriago	Kenya	DNF
	Kelvin Josue Gallo	Honduras	DNS
	Dejan Angeloski	North Macedonia	DNS

=== 2022 World Mountain Running Championships Men's Up & Downhill (11.2km) Team Standings ===
Rank	Country	Racers	Score
1.	Uganda	1 Samuel Kibet; 3 Timothy Toroitich; 4 Leonard Chemonges	8 pts
2.	Spain	6 Andreu Blanes Reig; 8 Oriol Cardona Coll; 15 Alejandro Garcia Carrillo	29 pts
3.	Italy	7 Alberto Vender; 9 Cesare Maestri; 14 Xavier Chevrier	30 pts
4.	Czech Republic	10 Jáchym Kovář; 11 Marek Chrascina; 22 Viktor Šinágl	43 pts
5.	United Kingdom	17 Andrew Douglas; 20.5 Ross Gollan; 24 Chris Richards	61.5 pts
6.	France	12.5 Théodore Klein; 23 Baptiste Fourmont; 31 Killian Allaire	66.5 pts
7.	Switzerland	12.5 Joey Hadorn; 25 Jonas Soldini; 33.5 Pascal Buchs	71 pts
8.	Mexico	18 Everardo Moreno; 26 David Santiago; 36 Cesar Daniel Gomez	80 pts
9.	United States	16 Daniel Curts; 37 Andy Wacker; 39 Mason Coppi	92 pts
10.	Norway	20.5 Halfdan-Emil Færø; 45 Johan Bugge; 48 Øyvind Heiberg Sundby	113.5 pts
11.	Canada	30 Alexandre Ricard; 32 Remi Leroux; 54 Shaun Stephens-Whale	116 pts
12.	Chile	38 Diego Ignacio Diaz Inostroza; 43 Gabriel Halans Muñoz Flores; 47 Hugo Felipe Contreras Campos	128 pts
13.	Belgium	27 Maximilien Drion Du Chapois; 49 Thibault Triaille; 59 Gaetan Piette	135 pts
14.	Thailand	53 Sanchai Namkhet; 56 Danchai Pankong; 57 Seksan Jakkaew	166 pts

=== 2022 World Mountain Running Championships 6.5 km U20 Men's Results ===
Rank	Name	Nationality	Time
1	Leonard Chemutai	Uganda	21:07
2	Caleb Arap Musobo Tungwet	Uganda	21:44
3	Denis Kiplangat	Uganda	22:18
4	Silas Rotich	Uganda	23:01
5	Finlay Grant	United Kingdom	23:26
6	Fabian Venero Jimenez	Spain	23:28
7	Baptiste Cartieaux	France	23:29
7	Michael Maiorano	United States	23:29
9	Elia Mattio	Italy	23:51
10	Fraser Gilmour	United Kingdom	23:58
11	Pierre Boudy	France	24:02
12	Marcos Villamuera Izquierdo	Spain	24:03
12	Eduardo Pichardo	Mexico	24:03
14	Tomas Reyes	Mexico	24:07
15	Mélaine Le Palabe	France	24:28
16	Manuel Santiago	Mexico	24:29
17	Simone Giolitti	Italy	24:36
18	Miguel Angel Lopez	Mexico	24:41
19	William Longden	United Kingdom	24:45
20	Antonin Therond	France	24:46
21	Alvaro Osanz Laborda	Spain	24:50
22	Matteo Bardea	Italy	24:52
23	Torrella Oller	Spain	24:56
24	Nicolò Lora Moretto	Italy	25:01
25	Christian Groendyk	United States	25:21
26	Edward Corden	United Kingdom	26:04
27	Ignatius Fitzgerald	United States	26:07
28	Tomas Ariel Lifona	Argentina	26:36
29	Zack Newsham	Australia	27:06
30	Dalton Kaines	United States	27:37
31	Benjamin Rickerby	New Zealand	27:48
32	Pornchinrat Jamroon	Thailand	28:11
33	Diego Rebolledo	Argentina	28:43
34	Toby Lang	Australia	29:46
35	Itthipon Kokthongkham	Thailand	32:27
36	Nubngern Lappoontavee	Thailand	33:02
36	Ittipat Kodkaew	Thailand	33:02

=== 2022 World Mountain Running Championships 6.5 km U20 Men's Team Standings ===
Rank	Country	Racers	Score
1.	Uganda	1 Leonard Chemutai; 2 Caleb Arap Musobo Tungwet; 3 Denis Kiplangat	6 pts
2.	France	7.5 Baptiste Cartieaux; 11 Pierre Boudy; 15 Mélaine Le Palabe	33.5 pts
3.	United Kingdom	5 Finlay Grant; 10 Fraser Gilmour; 19 William Longden	34 pts
4.	Spain	6 Fabian Venero Jimenez; 12.5 Marcos Villamuera Izquierdo; 21 Alvaro Osanz Laborda	39.5 pts
5.	Mexico	12.5 Eduardo Pichardo; 14 Tomas Reyes; 16 Manuel Santiago	42.5 pts
6.	Italy	9 Elia Mattio; 17 Simone Giolitti; 22 Matteo Bardea	48 pts
7.	United States	7.5 Michael Maiorano; 25 Christian Groendyk; 27 Ignatius Fitzgerald	59.5 pts
8.	Thailand	32 Pornchinrat Jamroon; 35 Itthipon Kokthongkham; 36.5 Nubngern Lappoontavee	103.5 pts

=== 2022 World Mountain Running Championships Uphill Mountain Women's Results ===
Rank	Name	Nationality	Time
1	Allie McLaughlin	United States	55:15
2	Andrea Mayr	Austria	55:41
3	Maude Mathys	Switzerland	56:00
4	Monica Madalina Florea	Romania	57:44
5	Onditz Iturbe Arginzoniz	Spain	57:56
6	Susanna Saapunki	Finland	58:12
7	Elisa Sortini	Italy	58:42
8	Christel Dewalle	France	58:49
9	Tereza Hrochová	Czech Republic	59:12
10	Hanna Groeber	Germany	59:27
11	Scout Adkin	United Kingdom	59:45
12	Lauren Gregory	United States	1:00:06
13	Judith Wyder	Switzerland	1:00:14
14	Ruth Jones	United Kingdom	1:00:54
15	Adeline Martin Roche	France	1:01:17
16	Holly Page	United Kingdom	1:01:46
17	Silvia Schwaiger	Slovakia	1:01:47
18	Pavla Schorná Matyášová	Czech Republic	1:01:54
19	Anne Golden Bersagel	Norway	1:02:10
20	Kate Avery	United Kingdom	1:02:16
21	Gloria Rita Antonia Giudici	Italy	1:02:28
22	Clémentine Geoffray	France	1:02:38
23	Valentina Belotti	Italy	1:02:46
24	Hana Švestková Stružková	Czech Republic	1:03:10
25	Selina Burch	Switzerland	1:03:21
26	Rachel Tomajczyk	United States	1:03:43
27	Gabriela Veigertová	Czech Republic	1:03:54
28	Maria Ordoñez Marina	Spain	1:04:20
29	Lina Kott Helander	Sweden	1:04:57
30	Kerri Labrecque	Canada	1:04:59
31	Joana Soares	Portugal	1:05:02
32	Simone Troxler	Switzerland	1:05:17
33	Monica Iren Solvang	Norway	1:05:17
34	Charlotte Cotton	Belgium	1:05:35
35	Joyce Njeru	Kenya	1:06:15
36	Louise Sharp	Australia	1:07:28
37	Anita Iversen Lilleskare	Norway	1:07:37
38	Laia Montoya Garcia	Spain	1:08:00
39	Yuri Yoshizumi	Japan	1:08:47
40	Maria Florencia Milanesi	Argentina	1:09:36
41	Andrea Rico González	Spain	1:11:46
42	Elena Stephenson	Australia	1:11:48
43	Sanna Kott Helander	Sweden	1:11:55
44	Sarah Douglas	New Zealand	1:12:06
45	Maria Belen Sanchez Ruiz	Argentina	1:13:00
46	Jeanette Macarena Cayuqueo Domihual	Chile	1:14:13
47	Kate Morrison	New Zealand	1:14:50
48	Sasirada Chanpaeng	Thailand	1:17:32
49	Montanna Mcavoy	Australia	1:18:31
50	Eva Pringle	New Zealand	1:19:21
51	Natthaya Thanaronnawat	Thailand	1:19:29
52	Ana Ailin Funes	Argentina	1:21:56
53	Dinaira Gonzalez	Venezuela	1:25:45
54	Nampetch Porntharukcharoen	Thailand	1:31:04
55	Muktapha Changhin	Thailand	1:41:33
DNF	Alessia Scaini	Italy	DNF

=== 2022 World Mountain Running Championships Uphill Mountain Women's Team Standings ===
Rank	Country	Racers	Score
1.	United States	1 Allie McLaughlin; 12 Lauren Gregory; 26 Rachel Tomajczyk	39 pts
2.	United Kingdom	11 Scout Adkin; 14 Ruth Jones; 16 Holly Page	41 pts
3.	Switzerland	3 Maude Mathys; 13 Judith Wyder; 25 Selina Burch	41 pts
4.	France	8 Christel Dewalle; 15 Adeline Martin Roche; 22 Clémentine Geoffray	45 pts
5.	Italy	7 Elisa Sortini; 21 Gloria Rita Antonia Giudici; 23 Valentina Belotti	51 pts
6.	Czech Republic	9 Tereza Hrochová; 18 Pavla Schorná Matyášová; 24 Hana Švestková Stružková	51 pts
7.	Spain	5 Onditz Iturbe Arginzoniz; 28 Maria Ordoñez Marina; 38 Laia Montoya Garcia	71 pts
8.	Norway	19 Anne Golden Bersagel; 33 Monica Iren Solvang; 37 Anita Iversen Lilleskare	89 pts
9.	Australia	36 Louise Sharp; 42 Elena Stephenson; 49 Montanna Mcavoy	127 pts
10.	Argentina	40 Maria Florencia Milanesi; 45 Maria Belen Sanchez Ruiz; 52 Ana Ailin Funes	137 pts
11.	New Zealand	44 Sarah Douglas; 47 Kate Morrison; 50 Eva Pringle	141 pts
12.	Thailand	48 Sasirada Chanpaeng; 51 Natthaya Thanaronnawat; 54 Nampetch Porntharukcharoen	153 pts

=== 2022 Trail World Championships 40k Women's Results ===
Rank	Name	Nationality	Time
1	Denisa Ionela Dragomir	Romania	3:49:23
2	Barbora Macurová	Czech Republic	3:51:22
3	Emilia Brangefält	Sweden	3:54:52
4	Nuria Gil Clapera	Spain	3:56:25
5	Sheila Aviles Castaño	Spain	3:56:39
6	Fabiola Conti	Italy	3:57:10
7	Kimber Mattox	United States	3:57:40
8	Eleanor Davis	United Kingdom	3:58:06
9	Sharon Taylor	United Kingdom	4:01:27
10	Julia Font Gomez	Spain	4:02:41
11	Ashley Brasovan	United States	4:04:05
12	Mathilde Sagnes	France	4:05:54
13	Stevie Kremer	United States	4:06:55
14	Takako Takamura	Japan	4:07:12
15	Anna-Stiina Erkkilä	Finland	4:07:55
16	Chiara Giovando	Italy	4:08:44
17	Esther Eustache	France	4:08:59
18	Nichola Jackson	United Kingdom	4:10:59
19	Anna Comet Pascua	Spain	4:12:38
20	Camilla Magliano	Italy	4:13:23
21	Andrea Kolbeinsdottir	Iceland	4:14:08
22	Catriona Graves	United Kingdom	4:16:21
23	Barbora Jíšová	Czech Republic	4:16:40
24	Johanna Gelfgren	Sweden	4:17:25
25	Kristina Mascarenas	United States	4:18:22
26	Ariane Wilhem	Switzerland	4:18:45
27	Ulrikke Evensen	Denmark	4:19:13
28	Louise Serban Penhoat	France	4:20:13
29	Paige Linegar	Australia	4:20:14
30	Marisa Vieira	Portugal	4:24:32
31	Anaïs Sabrie	France	4:25:55
32	Virginia Perez Mesonero	Spain	4:27:23
33	Ivana Iozzia	Italy	4:32:27
34	Hanna Darmohrai	Ukraine	4:32:37
35	Roxana Flores	Argentina	4:33:10
36	Inês João	Portugal	4:33:18
37	Candice Fertin	France	4:34:05
38	Mariana Machado	Portugal	4:36:01
39	Lucie Šaclová	Czech Republic	4:36:49
40	Maria Ines Chrestia	Argentina	4:37:44
41	Nádia Casteleiro	Portugal	4:37:47
42	Patricia Ariela Cobi Velasquez	Chile	4:37:55
43	Lina Kott Helander	Sweden	4:39:14
44	Amy Daniel	Australia	4:40:56
45	Irita Puķīte	Latvia	4:42:13
46	Magaly Bonilla	Ecuador	4:44:54
47	Laura Hulgaard	Denmark	4:45:45
48	Veronica Palmira Filippa	Argentina	4:46:29
49	Maria Paula Galindez	Argentina	4:48:05
50	Amalie Bengtsson	Denmark	4:50:24
51	Jessica Campbell	New Zealand	4:51:03
52	Jeanette Macarena Cayuqueo Domihaul	Chile	4:57:26
53	Anne Marie John	Mauritius	4:58:02
54	Kelsey Lepard	Canada	4:58:08
55	Iris Anna Skuladottir	Iceland	5:01:08
56	Darika Suwanmongkol	Thailand	5:06:55
57	Michelle Merlis	United States	5:07:31
58	Nisachon Morgan	Thailand	5:09:26
59	Sigthora Brynja Kristjansdottir	Iceland	5:13:46
60	Valentyna Horban	Ukraine	5:17:13
61	Veronica Galvan	Argentina	5:21:26
62	Keerati Tepinta	Thailand	5:22:31
63	Erika Acosta	Venezuela	5:33:31
64	Nuraini Siti	Indonesia	5:38:37
65	Liāna Ginela	Latvia	5:45:40
66	Lita Dzelme	Latvia	5:47:52
67	Edita Krušinskienė	Lithuania	5:51:36
68	Inga Aukštuolytė	Lithuania	6:03:56
69	Dana Mačtama	Latvia	6:05:55
70	Ramunė Petrulytė	Lithuania	6:12:04
71	Wipawee Pratumsuwan	Thailand	6:21:07
72	Yupa Saelee	Thailand	6:21:08
73	Agnė Mataitytė	Lithuania	6:38:57
74	Jassica Binti Lintanga	Malaysia	6:55:23
DNF	Sanna Kott Helander	Sweden	DNF
DNS	Allie Mclaughlin	United States	DNS
DNS	Lauren Gregory	United States	DNS

=== 2022 World Mountain Running Championships 40k Women's Team Standings ===
Rank	Country	Racers	Score
1.	Spain	3:56:25 Nuria Gil Clapera; 3:56:39 Sheila Aviles Castaño; 4:02:41 Julia Font Gomez	11:55:44
2.	United States	3:57:40 Kimber Mattox; 4:04:05 Ashley Brasovan; 4:06:55 Stevie Kremer	12:08:39
3.	United Kingdom	3:58:06 Eleanor Davis; 4:01:27 Sharon Taylor; 4:10:59 Nichola Jackson	12:10:30
4.	Italy	3:57:10 Fabiola Conti; 4:08:44 Chiara Giovando; 4:13:23 Camilla Magliano	12:19:16
5.	France	4:05:54 Mathilde Sagnes; 4:08:59 Esther Eustache; 4:20:13 Louise Serban Penhoat	12:35:04
6.	Czech Republic	3:51:22 Barbora Macurová; 4:16:40 Barbora Jíšová; 4:36:49 Lucie Šaclová	12:44:49
7.	Sweden	3:54:52 Emilia Brangefält; 4:17:25 Johanna Gelfgren; 4:39:14 Lina Kott Helander	12:51:29
8.	Portugal	4:24:32 Marisa Vieira; 4:33:18 Inês João; 4:36:01 Mariana Machado	13:33:50
9.	Denmark	4:19:13 Ulrikke Evensen; 4:45:45 Laura Hulgaard; 4:50:24 Amalie Bengtsson	13:55:19
10.	Argentina	4:33:10 Roxana Flores; 4:37:44 Maria Ines Chrestia; 4:46:29 Veronica Palmira Filippa	13:57:21
11.	Iceland	4:14:08 Andrea Kolbeinsdottir; 5:01:08 Iris Anna Skuladottir; 5:13:46 Sigthora Brynja Kristjansdottir	14:29:01
12.	Thailand	5:06:55 Darika Suwanmongkol; 5:09:26 Nisachon Morgan; 5:22:31 Keerati Tepinta	15:38:51
13.	Latvia	4:42:13 Irita Puķīte; 5:45:40 Liāna Ginela; 5:47:52 Lita Dzelme	16:15:43
14.	Lithuania	5:51:36 Edita Krušinskienė; 6:03:56 Inga Aukštuolytė; 6:12:04 Ramunė Petrulytė	18:07:35

=== 2022 Trail World Championships 80k Women's Results ===
Rank	Name	Nationality	Time
1	Blandine L'Hirondel	France	8:22:14
2	Ida Nilsson	Sweden	8:34:59
3	Gemma Arenas Alcazar	Spain	8:46:27
4	Eszter Csillag	Hungary	8:49:24
5	Rosanna Buchauer	Germany	8:50:45
6	Audrey Tanguy	France	8:51:57
7	Marion Delespierre	France	8:51:57
8	Maite Mayora Elizondo	Spain	8:56:40
9	Giuditta Turini	Italy	9:00:05
10	Sunmaya Budha	Nepal	9:00:28
11	Emma Pooley	Switzerland	9:05:08
12	Sylvia Nordskar	Norway	9:06:43
13	Johanna Antila	Finland	9:07:09
14	Honoka Akiyama	Japan	9:09:20
15	Marta Molist Codina	Spain	9:10:13
16	Jocelyne Pauly	France	9:14:20
17	Katarzyna Wilk	Poland	9:14:58
18	Mari Klakegg Fenre	Norway	9:15:16
19	Leah Yingling	United States	9:16:28
20	Manon Bohard Cailler	France	9:23:24
21	Laure Paradan	France	9:25:30
22	Katarzyna Solińska	Poland	9:27:54
23	Camilla Spagnol	Italy	9:30:52
24	Kaytlyn Gerbin	United States	9:33:08
25	Alessandra Boifava	Italy	9:35:11
26	Monica Vives Vila	Spain	9:36:06
27	Brittany Charboneau	United States	9:43:52
28	Sara-Rebekka Færø Linde	Norway	9:46:49
29	Katie Kaars Sijpesteijn	United Kingdom	9:47:35
30	Esther Fellhofer	Austria	9:54:44
31	Man Yee Cheung	Hong Kong	9:57:49
32	Inês Marques	Portugal	9:58:02
33	Azara Garcia De Los Salmones Marcano	Spain	10:18:24
34	Meryl Cooper	United Kingdom	10:21:34
35	Sarah Ludowici	Australia	10:22:25
36	Paula Barbosa	Portugal	10:27:45
37	Inga Cimarmanaitė	Lithuania	10:32:20
38	Addie Bracy	United States	10:40:42
39	Adriana Vanesa Vargas	Argentina	10:43:32
40	Anabel Oviedo Zelarrayan	Argentina	10:43:47
41	Dominika Stelmach	Poland	10:48:16
42	Louise Clifton	Australia	10:56:40
43	Laura Čakle	Latvia	10:59:17
44	Ying Suet Leung	Hong Kong	11:02:28
45	Jessica Schluter	Australia	11:05:39
46	Gitana Akmanavičiūtė	Lithuania	11:09:47
47	Maria Silvina Perez	Argentina	11:19:55
48	Maria Belen Barrera	Argentina	11:19:55
49	Gillian Fowler	Australia	11:22:49
50	Lucinda Sousa	Portugal	11:26:46
51	Joannie Desroches	Canada	11:32:19
52	Maïka Lamoureux	Canada	11:32:21
53	Benjamas Chotemateepirom	Thailand	11:37:37
54	Rannveig Oddsdottir	Iceland	11:39:40
55	Thea Hanssen	Norway	11:45:08
56	Marija Pipiraitė-Grumbinė	Lithuania	11:52:14
57	Elisabet Margeirsdottir	Iceland	11:53:42
58	Fan Xiang	Australia	11:54:43
59	Jatupornpunoot Putthajunya	Thailand	11:56:38
60	Carolina Tania Diaz Estevez	Argentina	11:57:41
61	Maira Valeria Mardones	Argentina	12:06:22
62	Phichanan Mahachot	Thailand	12:07:39
63	Phichamon Ruksakul	Thailand	12:08:52
64	Hsiu-Ching Chen	Taiwan	12:20:00
65	Chonlada Kappiyanond	Thailand	12:41:18
66	Elīna Jokuma	Latvia	12:59:14
67	Theresia Ruth	Indonesia	13:00:45
68	Ilze Limanāne	Latvia	13:07:07
69	Hsiao-Hui Lo	Taiwan	13:19:08
70	Elīna Kabaļina	Latvia	14:35:33
71	Wen-Ya Tsai	Taiwan	15:07:12
DNF	Daniela Lasso	Ecuador	DNF
DNF	Sally Ann Yap Yu Ing	Malaysia	DNF
DNF	Olena Khashko	Ukraine	DNF
DNS	Marcela Vašínová	Czech Republic	DNS
DNS	Henriette Albon	Norway	DNS
DNS	Jennifer Lichter	United States	DNS

=== 2022 Trail World Championships 80k Women's Team Standing ===
Rank	Country	Racers	Score
1.	France	8:22:14 Blandine L'Hirondel; 8:51:57 Audrey Tanguy; 8:51:57 Marion Delespierre	26:06:06
2.	Spain	8:46:27 Gemma Arenas Alcazar; 8:56:40 Maite Mayora Elizondo; 9:10:13 Marta Molist Codina	26:53:19
3.	Italy	9:00:05 Giuditta Turini; 9:30:52 Camilla Spagnol; 9:35:11 Alessandra Boifava	28:06:06
4.	Norway	9:06:43 Sylvia Nordskar; 9:15:16 Mari Klakegg Fenre; 9:46:49 Sara-Rebekka Færø Linde	28:08:46
5.	United States	9:16:28 Leah Yingling; 9:33:08 Kaytlyn Gerbin; 9:43:52 Brittany Charboneau	28:33:26
6.	Poland	9:14:58 Katarzyna Wilk; 9:27:54 Katarzyna Solińska; 10:48:16 Dominika Stelmach	29:31:05
7.	Portugal	9:58:02 Inês Marques; 10:27:45 Paula Barbosa; 10:40:33 Cristina Arreiol	31:06:19
8.	Australia	10:22:25 Sarah Ludowici; 10:56:40 Louise Clifton; 11:05:39 Jessica Schluter	32:24:43
9.	Argentina	10:43:32 Adriana Vanesa Vargas; 10:43:47 Anabel Oviedo Zelarrayan; 11:19:55 Maria Silvina Perez	32:47:12
10.	Lithuania	10:32:20 Inga Cimarmanaitė; 11:09:47 Gitana Akmanavičiūtė; 11:52:14 Marija Pipiraitė-Grumbinė	33:34:18
11.	Thailand	11:37:37 Benjamas Chotemateepirom; 11:56:38 Jatupornpunoot Putthajunya; 12:07:39 Phichanan Mahachot	35:41:52
12.	Latvia	10:59:17 Laura Čakle; 12:59:14 Elīna Jokuma; 13:07:07 Ilze Limanāne	37:05:37
13.	Taiwan	12:20:00 Hsiu-Ching Chen; 13:19:08 Hsiao-Hui Lo; 15:07:12 Wen-Ya Tsai	40:46:18

=== 2022 World Mountain Running Championships 11.2 km Women's Results ===
Rank	Name	Nationality	Time
1	Rebecca Cheptegei	Uganda	46:25
2	Annet Chemengich Chelangat	Uganda	46:52
3	Allie McLaughlin	United States	48:31
4	Monica Madalina Florea	Romania	49:12
5	Scout Adkin	United Kingdom	50:19
6	Judith Wyder	Switzerland	50:36
7	Hanna Groeber	Germany	50:49
8	Holly Page	United Kingdom	50:52
9	Onditz Iturbe Arginzoniz	Spain	50:57
10	Adeline Martin Roche	France	51:01
11	Tereza Hrochová	Czech Republic	51:09
12	Susanna Saapunki	Finland	51:16
13	Maude Mathys	Switzerland	51:31
14	Sara Bottarelli	Italy	52:01
15	Rea Iseli	Switzerland	52:04
16	Marie Nivet	France	52:06
17	Pavla Schorná Matyášová	Czech Republic	52:10
18	Alice Gaggi	Italy	52:17
19	Rachel Tomajczyk	United States	52:23
20	Chiara Mainetti	Argentina	52:24
21	Sarah Mccormack	Ireland	52:47
22	Clémentine Geoffray	France	53:03
23	Corey Dowe	United States	53:19
24	Silvia Schwaiger	Slovakia	53:29
25	Naomi Lang	United Kingdom	53:53
26	Kate Avery	United Kingdom	53:55
27	Valeria Roffino	Italy	54:12
28	Ingrid Mutter	Romania	54:25
29	Elena Stephenson	Australia	54:27
30	Rosa Liliana Godoy	Argentina	54:31
31	Christel Dewalle	France	54:32
32	Vivien Bonzi	Italy	54:44
33	Maria Ordoñez Marina	Spain	55:01
34	Yuri Yoshizumi	Japan	55:04
35	Monica Iren Solvang	Norway	55:18
36	Anita Iversen Lilleskare	Norway	56:05
36	Gabriela Veigertová	Czech Republic	56:05
38	Hana Švestková Stružková	Czech Republic	56:06
39	Laia Montoya Garcia	Spain	56:12
40	Samantha Lewis	United States	56:24
41	Anne Golden Bersagel	Norway	57:22
42	Montanna Mcavoy	Australia	57:27
43	Shannon Penway	Canada	57:32
44	Charlotte Cotton	Belgium	57:33
45	Simone Brick	Australia	57:51
46	Fernanda Erica Martinez	Argentina	58:04
47	Sarah Douglas	New Zealand	59:35
48	Laurie Phai	Cambodia	59:41
49	Andrea Rico González	Spain	59:47
50	Yadira Franco	Mexico	1:00:35
51	Cristina Isabel Barriga Catelican	Chile	1:00:40
52	Paola Martinez	Venezuela	1:02:16
53	Woraphan Nuanlsri	Thailand	1:02:37
54	Selina Burch	Switzerland	1:05:16
55	Dinaira Gonzalez	Venezuela	1:08:11
56	Natthaya Thanaronnawat	Thailand	1:10:39
57	Jetnipit Ruangmak	Thailand	1:13:08
58	Aline Seng	Cambodia	1:14:11
59	Muyngim Eng	Cambodia	1:17:08
60	Krittika Houngsuwannakorn	Thailand	1:18:02
61	Silvia Adriana Gonzalez Victorica	Argentina	1:44:09
	Sasha Gollish	Canada	DNF
	Joyce Njeru	Kenya	DNF
	Rispa Cherop	Uganda	DNF
	Vilma Maria Escoto Rodriguez	Honduras	DNS
	Denisa Ionela Dragomir	Romania	DNS

=== 2022 World Mountain Running Championships Up and Downhill Mountain 11.2 km Women's Race Team Standing ===
Rank	Country	Racers	Score
1.	Switzerland	6 Judith Wyder; 13 Maude Mathys; 15 Rea Iseli	34 pts
2.	United Kingdom	5 Scout Adkin; 8 Holly Page; 25 Naomi Lang	38 pts
3.	United States	3 Allie Mclaughlin; 19 Rachel Tomajczyk; 23 Corey Dowe	45 pts
4.	France	10 Adeline Martin Roche; 16 Marie Nivet; 22 Clémentine Geoffray	48 pts
5.	Italy	14 Sara Bottarelli; 18 Alice Gaggi; 27 Valeria Roffino	59 pts
6.	Czech Republic	11 Tereza Hrochová; 17 Pavla Schorná Matyášová; 36.5 Gabriela Veigertová	64.5 pts
7.	Spain	9 Onditz Iturbe Arginzoniz; 33 Maria Ordoñez Marina; 39 Laia Montoya Garcia	81 pts
8.	Argentina	20 Chiara Mainetti; 30 Rosa Liliana Godoy; 46 Fernanda Erica Martinez	96 pts
9.	Norway	35 Monica Iren Solvang; 36.5 Anita Iversen Lilleskare; 41 Anne Golden Bersagel	112.5 pts
10.	Australia	29 Elena Stephenson; 42 Montanna Mcavoy; 45 Simone Brick	116 pts
11.	Cambodia	48 Laurie Phai; 58 Aline Seng; 59 Muyngim Eng	165 pts
12.	Thailand	53 Woraphan Nuanlsri; 56 Natthaya Thanaronnawat; 57 Jetnipit Ruangmak	166 pts

=== 2022 World Mountain Running Championships 6.5 km U20 Women's Results ===
Rank	Name	Nationality	Time
1	Jess Bailey	United Kingdom	26:27
2	Rebecca Flaherty	United Kingdom	27:45
3	Axelle Vicari	Italy	28:21
4	Ellen Weir	United Kingdom	28:28
5	Anna Hofer	Italy	28:32
5	Oakley Olson	United States	28:32
7	Lili Anne Beck	France	28:59
8	Pauline Trocellier	France	29:13
9	Blanca Batlle Busquet	Spain	29:17
10	Emily Vucemillo	Italy	29:52
11	Mariel Salazar	Mexico	29:56
12	Gemma Rebollo Osma	Spain	29:58
13	Samantha Blair	United States	30:00
14	Nélie Clement	France	30:23
15	Sonia Gonzalez	Mexico	30:33
16	Fannie Sapet	France	31:10
17	Sofia Peña	Mexico	31:23
18	Shalom Eunice Lescano	Argentina	31:49
18	Emily Gibbins	United Kingdom	31:49
20	Willow Lott	United States	32:15
21	Matilde Bonino	Italy	32:43
22	Ludmila Abigail Salguero	Argentina	36:27
23	Nuttakamon Monmeoy	Thailand	37:53
24	Ravint Wongratanaphisan	Thailand	38:05
25	Camila de La Colina	Argentina	38:26
26	Nattayada Ruanpor	Thailand	41:55

=== 2022 World Mountain Running Championships 6.5 km U20 Women's Team Standings ===
Rank	Country	Racers	Score
1.	United Kingdom	1 Jess Bailey; 2 Rebecca Flaherty; 4 Ellen Weir	7 pts
2.	Italy	3 Axelle Vicari; 5.5 Anna Hofer; 10 Emily Vucemillo	18.5 pts
3.	France	7 Lili Anne Beck; 8 Pauline Trocellier; 14 Nélie Clement	29 pts
4.	United States	5.5 Oakley Olson; 13 Samantha Blair; 20 Willow Lott	38.5 pts
5.	Mexico	11 Mariel Salazar; 15 Sonia Gonzalez; 17 Sofia Peña	43 pts
6.	Argentina	18.5 Shalom Eunice Lescano; 22 Ludmila Abigail Salguero; 25 Camila de La Colina	65.5 pts
7.	Thailand	23 Nuttakamon Monmeoy; 24 Ravint Wongratanaphisan; 26 Nattayada Ruanpor	73 pts
