= Easy Money =

Easy Money may refer to:

== Film ==
- Easy Money (1917 film), an American drama film directed by Travers Vale
- Easy Money (1922 film), an American film produced by REOL Productions
- Easy Money (1925 film), an American silent film directed by Al Rogell
- Easy Money (1934 film), a British film directed by Redd Davis
- Easy Money (1936 film), an American film directed by Phil Rosen
- Easy Money (1948 film), a British satirical film directed by Bernard Knowles
- Easy Money (1981 film), a Soviet film directed by Yevgeny Matveyev
- Easy Money (1983 film), an American comedy film starring Rodney Dangerfield
- Easy Money (1987 film) (Tong tian da dao), a Hong Kong film starring Michelle Yeoh
- Easy Money (1991 film) (Lao biao fa qian han), a Hong Kong film starring Amy Yip
- Easy Money (1994 film) (Xian guang wei lai quan), a Hong Kong film starring Athena Chu
- Easy Money (2010 film) (Snabba Cash), a Swedish thriller film directed by Daniel Espinosa

== Music ==
- Easy Money, a band that included Toby Keith

=== Albums ===
- Easy Money (album), by John Anderson

=== Songs ===
- "Easy Money" (Johnny Marr song), 2014
- "Easy Money", by Billy Joel, from the album An Innocent Man
- "Easy Money", by Brad Paisley, from the album Time Well Wasted
- "Easy Money", by Bruce Springsteen, from the album Wrecking Ball
- "Easy Money", by Electric Light Orchestra, from the album Zoom
- "Easy Money", by Foghat, from the album Stone Blue
- "Easy Money", by Josh Graves, from the album Sing Away the Pain
- "Easy Money", by Karmin, from the album Leo Rising
- "Easy Money", by King Crimson, from the album Larks' Tongues in Aspic
- "Easy Money", by Lights, from the album Pep
- "Easy Money", by Little River Band, from the album The Net
- "Easy Money", by Lowell George, from the album Thanks, I'll Eat It Here
- "Easy Money", by Nick Cave, from the album Abattoir Blues / The Lyre of Orpheus
- "Easy Money", by REO Speedwagon, from the album Nine Lives
- "Easy Money", by Rickie Lee Jones, from the album Rickie Lee Jones
- "Easy Money", by Todd Snider, from the album Songs for the Daily Planet

== Books ==
- Easy Money (Lapidus novel), a novel by Jens Lapidus
- Easy Money (Siler novel), a novel by Jenny Siler
- Easy Money: Cryptocurrency, Casino Capitalism, and the Golden Age of Fraud, 2023 book by Ben McKenzie with Jacob Silverman

== Other ==
- Easy Money (board game), by Milton Bradley
- Easy Money (TV series), 2008 U.S. dramedy series on the CW television network
- Easy Money Creek, a stream in Alaska
- East Money Information, Chinese company

== See also ==
- Ea$y Money, a 1988 board game by Milton Bradley
- Get-rich-quick scheme
- Make Money Fast
