= Hellgate Canyon =

Canyon in Missoula, Montana

Coordinates: 46.75°N 113.71°W

Hellgate Canyon is a canyon in Missoula County, Montana, formed by the Clark Fork River. It is located just to the east of Missoula, and is approximately fifty miles long. The entrance to the canyon is known as Hell's Gate.

== Name ==
Hellgate Canyon's name is a reference to an ambush that occurred there, in which the Séliš u Ql̓ispé / k̓upawiȼq̓nuk (Flathead) were defeated by the Niitsítapi (Blackfeet). The evidence of these ambushes was known as the "gates of hell", which led to the canyon acquiring its current name.

Its name in Niitsíʼpowahsin (ᖹᒧᐧᑲᖷᐦᓱᐡ, the Blackfoot language) is Iitassiimoo (ᖱᒣᓱᒐ, [iːd̥asːiːmoː], pronounced like ee-duh-ssee-mo), meaning where we ambushed the enemy.

== Historical significance ==
French-Canadian settlers in Montana thought that the local Native Americans, especially those of the Flathead Nation, traveled through Hellgate Canyon to hunt for bison. Lewis and Clark passed through Hellgate Canyon during their expedition through the Western United States. During the mid-19th century, the canyon became a major strategic corridor in the region, and the Mullan Road was routed through it. The Northern Pacific Railroad and Milwaukee Railroad were later routed along a similar path. Later in the 19th century, Carrie Strahorn, also an explorer, wrote about a stagecoach ride she took in the area in 1878. She described, among other things, a "veritable Lover’s Lane" formed above the canyon by an arch of wild roses. The Kim Williams trail replaces the old railroad through the western three miles of trail.

== See also ==
- Hellgate High School in Missoula, which is named after the canyon
- H is for Hellgate, a band also named after the canyon
