= Jenny Siler =

American writer (born 1971)

- Born: 1971 (age 54–55)
- Education: University of Southern Maine (BA)
- Occupation: Novelist
- Children: 1
- Writing career
- Pen name: Alex Carr
- Genres: Crime; thriller; spy
- Notable work: Easy Money (1998)
- Website: jennysiler.com

Jenny Siler (born 1971) is an American writer. She has written a number of crime thrillers under her own name, featuring strong female leads, as well as two novels under the pseudonym Alex Carr and a non-fiction biography.

== Early life, education and family ==
Siler grew up in Missoula, Montana. Her mother was an associate professor of English at the University of Montana. After attending Hellgate High School for one year, she left home and travelled around the United States and Europe for 13 years. She completed her high school studies during this time. In the late 1990s she returned to Missoula, having most recently worked as a bartender in Seattle, after the sale of her first novel through a publishing auction.

Siler graduated from the University of Southern Maine in 2024 with a bachelor's degree in philosophy. She and her husband have one daughter, and have previously owned a coffee shop together in Portland, Maine.

== Career ==
=== Easy Money (1998) ===
Siler's first novel, Easy Money (1998), is a thriller about a young woman drug runner who becomes an inadvertent investigator after the mysterious drowning death of a CIA agent.

=== Iced (2001), Shot (2002) and Flashback (2004) ===
Siler's first novel was followed by Iced (2001). Kirkus Reviews described it as "tightly plotted, thoroughly enjoyable, angst-filled: a tough-gal follow-up to Siler's excellent Easy Money (1999)". Publishers Weekly noted the introduction of a new main character and location from Easy Money, and while suggesting the novel "lacks a solid punch at its end", concluded that it "shows fine movement and rhythm", with her character being "a complex soul, faithless and dour, as rugged as the Montana wilderness". The Guardian called it "complex, rugged and entertaining". The Baltimore Sun described the work as "almost as cold and hard as winter itself, with a flinty female protagonist who repossesses cars for a living".

Shot (2002) is a novel about a woman who wants to find out the truth behind her husband's death. Kirkus Reviews describes the character as "tough but tender", and said Siler "hits her marks with quick, fast takes packed with telling clues and sharp details".

Flashback (2004) features an amnesiac young woman who must track down the killer of a convent of French nuns. In its review, Kirkus Reviews described Siler as "known for her cool, street-smart, wonderfully vulnerable action heroines". The review concludes that the novel "loses its way amid too much villainous complication and a sudden ending that doesn’t quite tie up", but is nevertheless "a fun ride". By contrast, Publishers Weekly called it a "beautifully written spy novel", and compared Siler to John le Carré. The Globe and Mail said that Siler "is turning into one of crime fiction's best authors of hot action thrillers".

=== Alex Carr novels ===
Siler has published two novels under the pseudonym Alex Carr, both thrillers set internationally with strong female leads.

Publishers Weekly called An Accidental American (2007) a "thought-provoking thriller", with "complex layers of lies and betrayal [that] keep the reader happily guessing up to the end". The Daily Telegraph described it as "downbeat" compared to Siler's earlier novels, and compared her "blend of lyrical brooding and violent action" to Len Deighton's work.

The Prince of Bagram Prison (2008) was about a terrorist interrogator working in Afghanistan. It was nominated for the 2009 Edgar Allan Poe Award for Best Paperback Original. While reviews spoke positively about the writing and main character, the book's plot was described in several reviews as confusing. The Washington Post said it was "a tribute to Alex Carr's considerable skill as a novelist that I hugely enjoyed [the book] without having much of a clue as to what was going on". Kirkus Reviews lauded the work as a "smart, timely thriller" and a "provocative tale of military intelligence gone haywire ... marred only by rapid and bewildering shifts of time and territory from the 1970s to the early 2000s, Afghanistan and Spain to Vietnam and Morocco". While similarly critical of the novel's time and place shifts, The New York Times praised the main character, a "smart striver who's neither fatally ambitious nor an unbelievable femme fatale"; "Almost singlehandedly, she manages to keep this spinning top of a novel guiltily entertaining".

=== The Art of the Heist (2009) ===
Together with art thief Myles Connor, Siler wrote The Art of the Heist: Confessions of a Master Art Thief, Rock-and-Roller, and Prodigal Son (2009). It received a starred review from Publishers Weekly, which noted that Connor's life "is the stuff of adventure novels". Kirkus Reviews praised it as revealing, although noting that the narrative "focuses on [Connor's] criminal glamour rather than the nitty-gritty mechanics of his devious deeds".

== Selected works ==
- Easy Money (Henry Holt, 1998; ISBN 978-0-8050-6025-6)
- Iced (Henry Holt, 2001; ISBN 0-8050-6438-9)
- Shot (Henry Holt, 2002; ISBN 0-8050-7203-9)
- Flashback (Henry Holt, 2004; ISBN 0-8050-7211-X)
- An Accidental American (as Alex Carr) (Random House, 2007; ISBN 978-0-8129-7708-0)
- The Prince of Bagram Prison (as Alex Carr) (Mortalis/Random House, 2008; ISBN 978-0-8129-7709-7)
- The Art of the Heist: Confessions of a Master Art Thief, Rock-and-Roller, and Prodigal Son (non-fiction, with Myles Connor) (Collins, 2009; ISBN 978-0-06-167228-6)
