= Adam Peterman =

American runner (born 1995)

Personal information
- Nationality: American
- Born: August 11, 1995 (age 30) Missoula, Montana
- Education: University of Colorado Boulder; Hellgate High School
- Height: 6 ft 2 in (188 cm)

Sport
- Sport: Ultramarathon; Track, cross country
- Events: 50 km, 80 km, 100 km, 5000 meters, 3000 metres steeplechase, 1500 meters, 10,000 metres
- College team: Colorado Buffaloes men's cross country
- Turned pro: 2018
- Coached by: Mark Wetmore & Heather Burroughs; 2013–2018; Self; 2018–present
Medal record
Men's athletics
Representing United States
World Championships
Gold medal – first place	2022 Chiang Mai, Thailand	80km
Gold medal – first place	2022 Chiang Mai, Thailand	Team 80km
Western States 100
Gold medal – first place	2022 Auburn	100 miles
Representing University of Colorado Pac-12 Conference
NCAA Cross Country Championships
Gold medal – first place	2014 Terre Haute	Team Gold

Adam Peterman (born August 11, 1995) is an American professional ultra-distance and marathon runner sponsored by Hoka.

== Personal life ==
Adam Peterman was born and raised in Missoula, Montana, where he developed a love for the outdoors and running at an early age. He went to Hellgate High School, where he excelled in cross country and track. Peterman's talent earned him a scholarship to run at the University of Colorado Boulder.

During his college years, Peterman faced various challenges, including various injuries such as Achilles tendinitis.

After winning his debut 100 mile race at the Western States 100, Peterman's most recent and serious injury sidelined him for most of 2023, a sacral stress fracture. He underwent surgery and spent months recovering, gradually transitioning from walking to cycling before returning to running, after which he ran his first race since 2022, the Antelope Island Buffalo Run, March 29, 2024. He continued his success in 2024 after placing 3rd at the Courmayeur - Champex - Chamonix (CCC) race by UTMB, being one of two Americans on the podium.

Adam lives with his fiancé, Erin Clark, in Missoula, Montana. The two met in college while attending and running for the University of Colorado Boulder. In his professional career, Peterman is often crewed by his family and Evan Barnes, a crewing specialist and long-time friend who has supported him during various high-profile trail races.

== Running career ==
=== High school record ===
Adam Peterman graduated from Hellgate High School class of 2013 is a Missoula, Montana native and 2013 Montana High School Association class AA 3200 m champion.

Representing Hellgate High School
Year	Cross Country class 2A state championship	Outdoor Track and Field class 2A state championship
2012–13	2nd 15:17.6	1600 m 3rd 4:17.26
2012–13	2nd 15:17.6	3200 m 1st 9:12.38
2011–12	3rd 15:31.0	1600 m 4th 4:28.28
2011–12	3rd 15:31.0	3200 m 4th 9:53.36
2010–11	3rd 15:49.0	1600 m 5th 4:33.47
2010–11	3rd 15:49.0	3200 m 4th 9:40.80
2009–10	29th 16:43.9	

Adam Peterman set Hellgate High School school records in 2 events, the 1,600-meters: 4:17 & 3,200-meters: 8:57, the later of which still stands as the school record.

=== NCAA record ===
Adam Peterman earned All-Pac-12 Conference honors after earning bronze and honorable mention All-American honors in 2016 in the steeplechase.

Peterman finished as Colorado's 7th runner as a part of their 2014 NCAA Division 1 Cross Country National Championship.

Year	Competition	Venue	Position	Event	Notes
Representing Colorado Buffaloes
2018	NCAA Division I Outdoor Track and Field Championships	California State University, Sacramento	41st	3000 m steeplechase	8:54.63
2018	Pac-12 Conference Outdoor Track and Field Championships	Stanford University	8th	3000 meters steeplechase	9:09.06
2018	Pac-12 Conference Outdoor Track and Field Championships	Stanford University	17th	5000 meters	14:39.26
2018	MPSF Indoor Track and Field Championships	University of Washington	14th	5000 meters	14:19.22
2017	NCAA Division I Cross Country Championships	Louisville, Kentucky	89th	10,000 meters	30:34.7
2017	Pac-12 Conference Cross Country Championships	University of Oregon	12th	8000 meters	24:07.0
2016	NCAA Division I Outdoor Track and Field Championships	University of Oregon	23rd	3000 meters steeplechase	8:53.58
2016	Pac-12 Conference Outdoor Track and Field Championships	University of Washington	3rd	3000 meters steeplechase	8:43.19
2015	NCAA Division I Outdoor Track and Field Championships	University of Texas	25th	3000 meters steeplechase	8:58.04
2015	Pac-12 Conference Outdoor Track and Field Championships	University of California, Los Angeles	8th	3000 meters steeplechase	8:58.04
2015	MPSF Indoor Track and Field Championships	University of Washington	19th	3000 meters	8:14.33
2014	NCAA Division I Cross Country Championships	Terre Haute, Indiana	202nd	10,000 meters	32:36.8
2014	Pac-12 Conference Cross Country Championships	University of California, Berkeley	28th	8000 meters	24:20.5
2014	MPSF Indoor Track and Field Championships	University of Washington	19th	3000 meters	8:14.33

Peterman graduated with environmental studies and geology degrees magna cum laude.

=== Professional career ===
Peterman is a two-time US trail national champion in the marathon.

Peterman's 2022 ultra marathon results ended with 4 consecutive win culminating in 2 gold medals at 2022 World Mountain and Trail Running Championships. USA Track & Field Mountain Ultra Trail (MUT) Running Council of long distance running has named Adam Peterman one of the 2022 USATF MUT Runners of the Year.

In 2024, Peterman continued his strong campaign of race results, finishing 3rd at the highly competitive UTMB CCC 100 km in a time of 10:28:50.

Adam Peterman's name was known by few in the trail community through late 2021, when he destroyed the field at the JFK 50 Miler and nearly broke a course record many assumed was indestructible.

2026 Notable Results
Place	Race	Distance	Location
2nd	Black Canyon Ultra	50 km	Phoenix, AZ
1st	Canyons Endurance Runs by UTMB	100 km	(United States) Auburn, CA
6th	Western States 100	100 M	(United States) Olympic Valley, CA

2024 Notable Results
Place	Race	Distance	Location
3rd	CCC by UTMB	100 km	(France) Chamonix
3rd	Broken Arrow Skyrace	46 km	(United States) Lake Tahoe, CA
1st	Antelope Island Buffalo Run	50 km	(United States) Syracuse, UT

2022 Notable Results
Place	Race	Distance	Location
1st	2022 Trail World Championships	78 km	(Thailand) Chiang Mai, THA
1st	Western States 100	100M	(United States) Olympic Valley, CA
1st	Canyons Endurance Runs by UTMB	100 km	(United States) Auburn, CA
1st	Chuckanut 50k	50 km	(United States) Bellingham, WA
