= Athletics at the 2015 Summer Universiade – Women's 5000 metres =

The women's 5000 metres event at the 2015 Summer Universiade was held on 9 and 11 July at the Gwangju Universiade Main Stadium.

== Medalists ==
| Gold | Silver | Bronze |
|---|---|---|
| Kristina Maki; Czech Republic | Camille Buscomb; New Zealand | Daria Maslova; Kyrgyzstan |

== Results ==
=== Heats ===
Qualification: First 5 in each heat (Q) and next 5 fastest (q) qualified for the semifinals.

| Rank | Heat | Name | Nationality | Time | Notes |
|---|---|---|---|---|---|
| 1 | 1 | Kristina Maki | Czech Republic | 16:18.10 | Q |
| 2 | 1 | Daria Maslova | Kyrgyzstan | 16:18.40 | Q |
| 3 | 1 | Jennifer Wenth | Austria | 16:18.58 | Q |
| 4 | 1 | Natsuki Omori | Japan | 16:18.99 | Q |
| 5 | 1 | Elif Karabulut | Turkey | 16:21.94 | Q, PB |
| 6 | 1 | Simone Christensen Glad | Denmark | 16:21.94 | q, SB |
| 7 | 2 | Camille Buscomb | New Zealand | 16:33.77 | Q |
| 8 | 1 | Holly Page | United States | 16:34.25 | q, PB |
| 8 | 2 | Rina Koeda | Japan | 16:34.25 | Q |
| 10 | 2 | Sara Sutherland | United States | 16:34.49 | Q |
| 11 | 2 | Rachel Cliff | Canada | 16:36.87 | Q |
| 12 | 2 | Paulina Kaczyńska | Poland | 16:36.94 | Q |
| 13 | 2 | Sanjivani Jadhav | India | 16:39.89 | q |
| 14 | 1 | Barbara Bressi | Italy | 16:40.52 | q, PB |
| 15 | 2 | Monika Juodeškaitė | Lithuania | 16:41.25 | q |
| 16 | 2 | Ilham El Mouradi | Morocco | 16:42.39 | SB |
| 17 | 2 | Nubia Arteaga | Venezuela | 17:32.77 | SB |
| 18 | 1 | Faith Keitany | Kenya | 17:46.37 | |
| 19 | 2 | Janet Okeago | Kenya | 17:46.98 | |
| 20 | 2 | Mamphielo Sibanda | South Africa | 17:48.35 | |
| 21 | 1 | Margarita Masías | Chile | 18:07.65 | |
| 22 | 1 | Ritu Dinkar | India | 18:17.82 | |
| 23 | 2 | Yetsemin González | Chile | 18:48.23 | |
| 24 | 1 | Ilsida Toemere | Suriname | 21:30.90 | |
| 25 | 1 | Hyacinthe Umukire | Rwanda | 23:17.85 | |
| | 1 | Emmanuellique Niyongere | Burundi | DNS | |
| | 2 | Chu Yun-Cheng | Chinese Taipei | DNS | |

=== Final ===
Official Video

| Rank | Name | Nationality | Time | Notes |
|---|---|---|---|---|
| 1st place, gold medalist(s) | Kristina Maki | Czech Republic | 16:03.29 | |
| 2nd place, silver medalist(s) | Camille Buscomb | New Zealand | 16:03.72 | |
| 3rd place, bronze medalist(s) | Daria Maslova | Kyrgyzstan | 16:04.09 | |
| 4 | Paulina Kaczyńska | Poland | 16:05.81 | |
| 5 | Sara Sutherland | United States | 16:06.94 | SB |
| 6 | Jennifer Wenth | Austria | 16:07.24 | |
| 7 | Natsuki Omori | Japan | 16:07.57 | |
| 8 | Rina Koeda | Japan | 16:09.92 | |
| 9 | Rachel Cliff | Canada | 16:13.08 | |
| 10 | Simone Christensen Glad | Denmark | 16:13.70 | SB |
| 11 | Elif Karabulut | Turkey | 16:15.34 | PB |
| 12 | Holly Page | United States | 16:16.17 | PB |
| 13 | Sanjivani Jadhav | India | 16:16.18 | PB |
| 14 | Monika Juodeškaitė | Lithuania | 16:24.42 | SB |
| 15 | Barbara Bressi | Italy | 16:31.40 | PB |
