= Hellgate High School =

Coordinates: 46.8630°N 113.9974°W

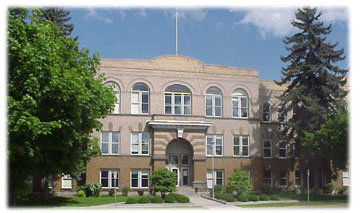
- West entrance on Higgins Avenue

Location
- 900 Higgins Avenue; Missoula, Montana 59801; United States

Information
- School type: Public, secondary school
- School district: Missoula County Public Schools District No. 1
- Principal: Judson Miller
- Staff: 95.63 (FTE)
- Grades: 9–12
- Enrollment: 1,312 (2023-2024)
- Student to teacher ratio: 13.72
- Language: English
- Campus: Urban
- Colors: Scarlet & Gold
- Mascot: The Hellgate Knight
- Team name: Knights
- Rivals: Sentinel, Big Sky
- Yearbook: Halberd, Hellgate Canyon
- Communities served: Missoula
- Elevation: 3,210 ft (980 m) AMSL
- Website: hellgate.mcpsmt.org

Hellgate High School is a four-year public high school in the western United States, located in Missoula, Montana. The second largest high school in the Missoula County Public Schools District, Hellgate has approximately 1300 students and a faculty of approximately 90. It is an AA high school, the classification given to Montana's largest high schools.

== History ==
Opened in 1908 as Missoula County High School, the school on Higgins Avenue was renamed Hellgate High in the mid-1960s, shortly after the foundation of Sentinel High School. Constructed 118 years ago, Hellgate is one of the oldest high school buildings in Montana; a three-story structure, it blends several different forms of architecture with a network of tunnels.

On September 24, 1952, the morning after giving his Checkers speech, Republican vice-presidential candidate Richard Nixon spoke at the school. He denied that politics was a dirty game, and stated that if students thought it was, they should get involved and clean it up.

Missoula County High School added a second campus in the fall of 1956, with freshman and sophomores staying at the Higgins Avenue unit, and the two upper classes moving to the new building on South Avenue, approximately 1.5 miles (2.4 km) southwest. Eight years later, the Hellgate and Sentinel names were established for the respective sites; the incoming junior class (1966) was divided between the campuses, with the full senior class (1965) at South Avenue in the last year as MCHS. In the summer of 1965, each campus became a stand alone four-year high school; the team names and colors of MCHS stayed at Sentinel, while new team names (pages, squires, and knights) and colors for Hellgate were created, with all new traditions.

Prior to 1965, Missoula County High School was the only public high school in Missoula, with Frenchtown High School the only other public high school in the county. Hellgate is named for Hellgate Canyon, a passage carved by the Clark Fork River through the mountains where Blackfeet warriors would lay in wait for the Interior Salish. French trappers called the canyon Porte de l'Enfer, translated as "Gate of Hell". Hell Gate Canyon remained a dangerous site until 1855, when the Flatheads and Blackfeet signed a treaty.

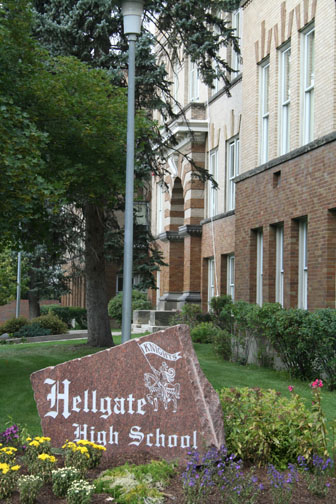
Hellgate High School

== Programs ==
=== Academic ===
In 2007, the Hellgate Academic WorldQuest team received first place in the state competition, and second in the nation. The team returned to nationals in 2010 and 2014.

=== Music ===
Hellgate High School's successful music programs send many band, orchestra, choir, and jazz students to the All-Northwest and All-State programs each year.

==== Choir ====
In 1997, the Choir Director received the Milken Family Foundation's National Educator Award.

In 2014 and 2024, Hellgate's choir was selected to sing at Carnegie Hall.

==== Missoula Youth Choir ====
Formed in 1987 by founders David Heidel and Dean Peterson, for the sole purpose of performing at the first International Choral Festival, the Missoula Youth Choir (MYC) has performed at every Festival since. MYC is composed of select high school students from Missoula's public high schools. MYC conductors are local Missoula high school directors who have collaborated on many school festivals and concerts.

==== Band ====
John Combs, the school's former band director who, as of 2010, serves as the fine arts supervisor for Missoula County Public Schools, was named outstanding music educator in both Montana and the Rocky Mountain West in 2010.

== Notable alumni ==
- Steve Albini, musician, audio engineer, and journalist
- Katharine Berkoff, swimmer and Olympic gold medalist, class of 2019
- Judith Blegen, soprano, class of 1959
- Adam Peterman, ultramarathoner, 2022 Western States Endurance Run champion, class of 2013
- Timm Rosenbach, NFL quarterback, class of 1985 (attended)
- Jenny Siler, novelist (attended for freshman year only)
- Dennis Washington, construction magnate, billionaire (MCHS)
