= Sara Sutherland =

American runner

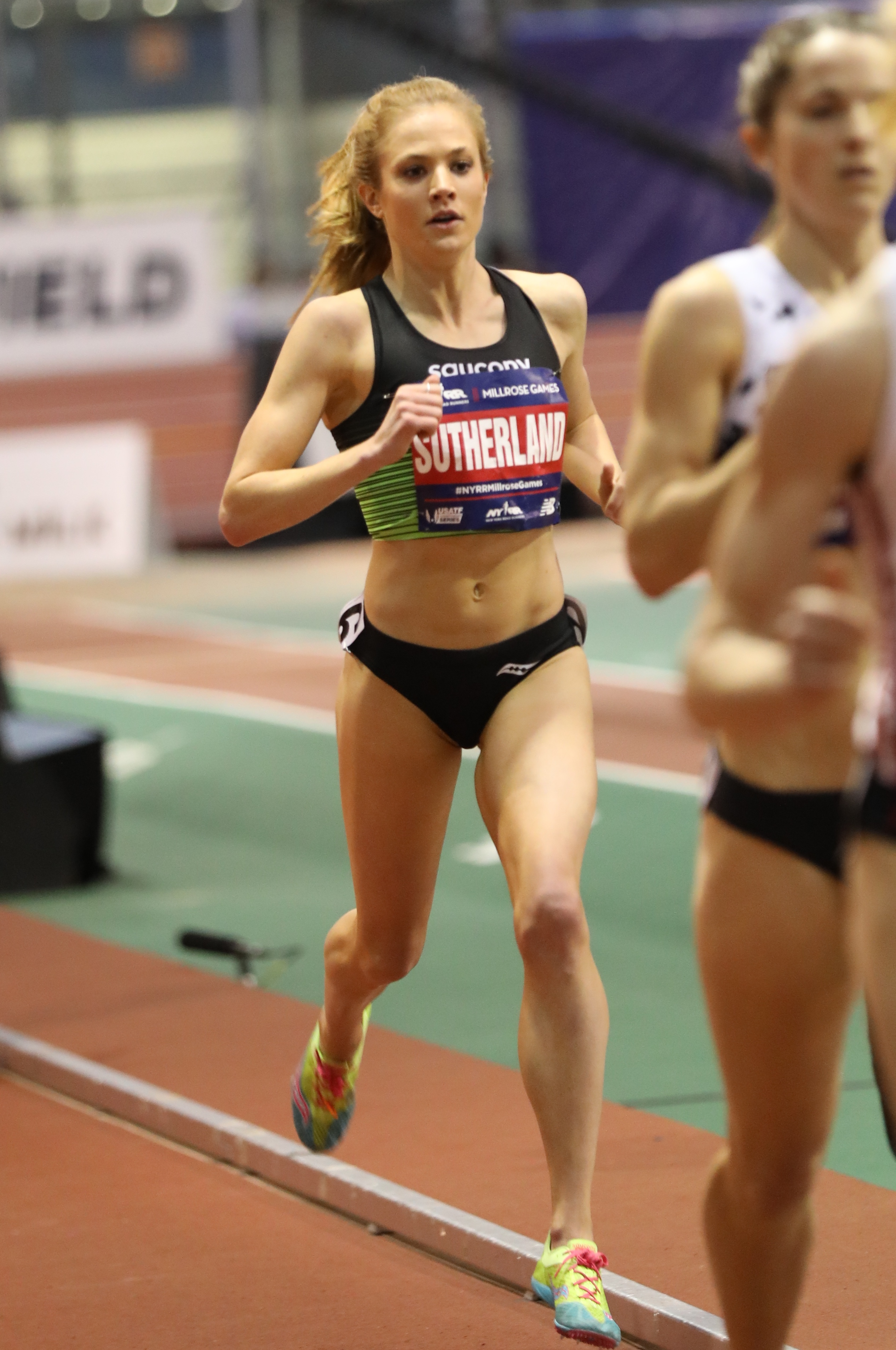
- Sutherland in 2019

Personal information
- Nationality: United States
- Born: January 31, 1992 (age 34) Dallas, Texas, U.S.
- Height: 5 ft 3 in (1.60 m)

Sport
- Sport: Track, long-distance running
- Event(s): 1500 meters, mile, 5000 meters, 10,000 meters
- College team: Colorado Buffs; Texas Longhorns
- Club: Saucony
- Turned pro: 2015

Achievements and titles
- Personal best(s): 1500 meters: 4:06.43 5000 meters: 15:26.59 10,000 meters: 34:28.07
- Updated on 11–7–15

Sara Sutherland (born January 31, 1992) is an American middle-distance and long-distance runner. While attending the University of Texas and University of Colorado, Sara Sutherland was a four-time NCAA Division I All-American cross country and Track and field runner.

== Highland Park High School ==
Sara Sutherland won the 2007 Texas University Interscholastic League 4A Cross Country Championship. She was named the 2009 Texas Girls Coaches Association Cross Country Athlete of the Year.

== NCAA ==
Sara Sutherland, a four-time NCAA Division I All-American in Track and field, graduated BA from University of Texas at Austin and has completed work on her MA in Technology for Global Development at the University of Colorado, Boulder.

== International ==
Sara Sutherland qualified to represent United States. She competed in Athletics at the 2015 Summer Universiade – Women's 5000 metres where she placed 5th.

=== USA National Championships ===
==== Track and field ====
Year	Competition	Venue	Position	Event	Notes
2015	USA Outdoor Track and Field Championships	Eugene, Oregon	25th	1500m	4:22.65
