= Monika Juodeškaitė =

Lithuanian runner

Monika Juodeskaite
Personal information
- Nationality: Lithuania
- Born: 3 October 1991 (age 34) Kaunas, Lithuania
- Height: 5 ft 6 in (1.68 m)

Sport
- Sport: Track, long-distance running
- Event(s): 1500 meters, mile, 5000 meters
- College team: Oklahoma State Cowboys and Cowgirls
- Turned pro: 2016

Achievements and titles
- Personal best(s): 1500 meters: 4:19.58 5000 meters: 16:00.32; 3000 meters: 9:10.83 Marathon: 2:34.29
Medal record
Representing Lithuania
Women's athletics
European championships in athletics
2014 European Team Championships
Silver medal – second place	2014 Braunschweig	1st league 3000 m
- Updated on 11–7–15

Monika Juodeskaite (born 3 October 1991) is a middle-distance and long-distance runner. While attending the Oklahoma State University, Monika was a two-time All-American runner and three-time NCAA Division I All-Midwest Region cross country.

== NCAA ==
Monika Juodeskaite earned ten All-Big 12 conference honors for Oklahoma State University. She was an All-American in 2013 Cross Country and 2014 Outdoor 5,000 Meters Outdoor Track and field.

== International ==
Monika qualified to represent Lithuania. She competed in Athletics at the 2015 Summer Universiade – Women's 5000 metres where she placed 14th in 16:24.42. She competed in 2013 European Athletics U23 Championships – Women's 5000 metres where she placed 10th in 16:22.46 (8th after disqualifications).

== Professional ==
Monika Juodeskaite qualified for 2016 Summer Olympic Standard in the Marathon. Her time in 2015 Chicago Marathon was 2:34.29.
