= Easy Money (Siler novel) =

Novel by Jenny Siler (1998)

Easy Money is a debut novel by American writer, Jenny Siler, published in 1998. It is a thriller about a young woman drug runner who becomes an inadvertent investigator after the mysterious drowning death of a CIA agent. Siler was inspired by former roommates who had worked in the illicit drug trade and by conspiracy theories about the death of former CIA director of William Colby.

== Reception ==
The Missoula Independent noted that the novel draws from Siler's "rich and interesting range of experiences". It was noted by The Guardian and Publishers Weekly as having established Siler as a new talent in crime fiction.

The work was named a Notable Book of 1999 by The New York Times; reviewer Marilyn Stasio praised Siler's "seductive voice" and "intensely vivid" writing, commenting that: "Once in a blue moon, a new writer speaks up in a voice that gets your attention like a rifle shot. [Siler] has that kind of voice: clean, direct and a little dangerous". The Wall Street Journal said Siler "has shown tough-guy thriller writers how a woman does it ... she packs some punch".

Cathrine Avery, writing in Contemporary Women's Writing, describes Easy Money and Siler's other early novels as belonging to the hardboiled detective genre, with "a central happenstance investigative character who works independently to solve a mystery". Siler herself has said that she was influenced by the Western genre and the idea of an outlaw or outsider who is "searching for their place in the world".

== Publication history ==
- Easy Money (Henry Holt, 1998; ISBN 978-0-8050-6025-6)
