= Allie McLaughlin =

American mountain runner

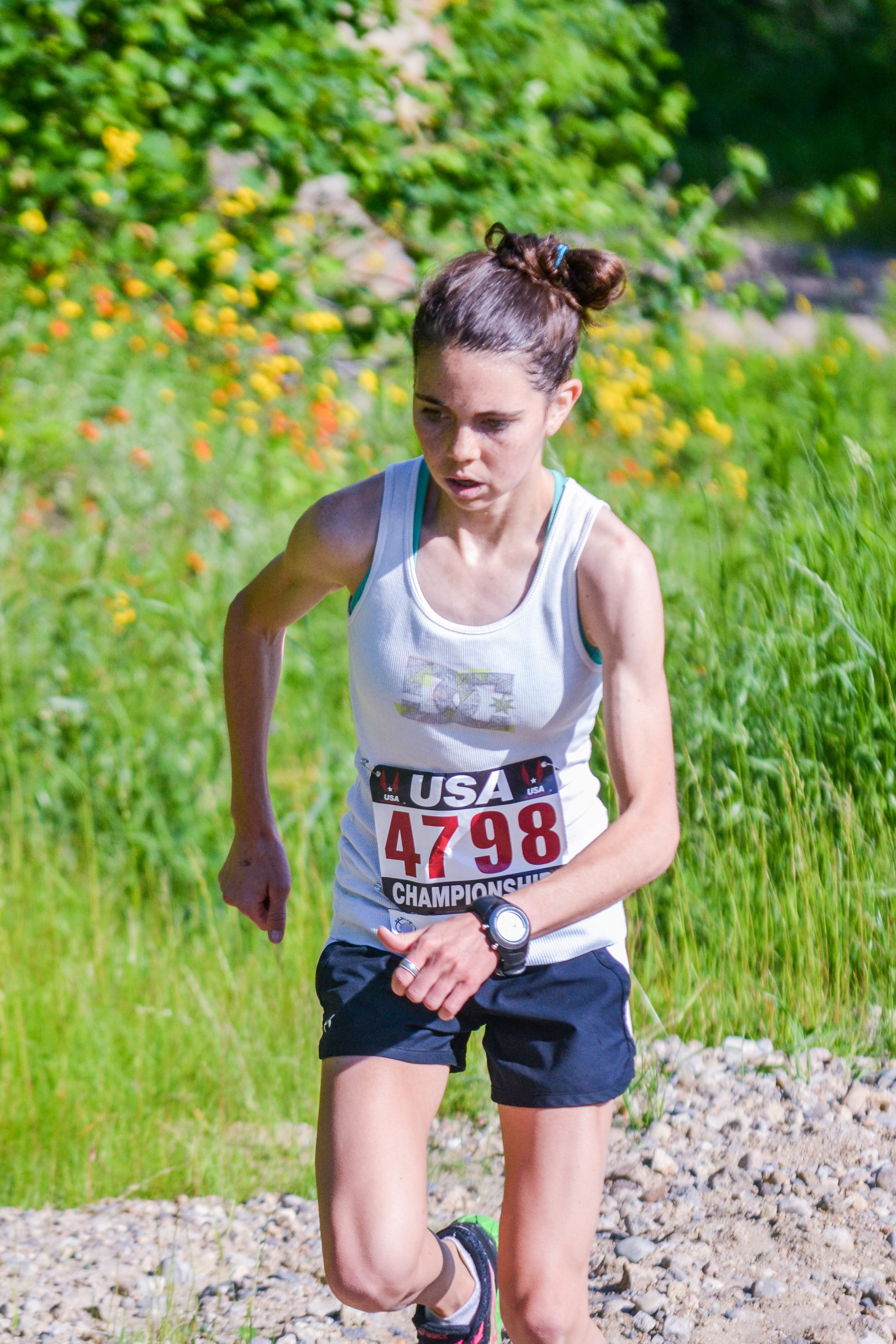
- Allie McLaughlin in 2014

Personal information
- Born: October 30, 1990 (age 36) Dayton, Ohio, U.S.

Sport
- Country: United States
- Sport: Mountain running

Allie McLaughlin (born October 30, 1990) is an American female mountain runner, world champion at the World Long Distance Mountain Running Championships (2014).

McLaughlin was gold medal with the national team at senior level at the 2017 World Mountain Running Championships.

In 2020 McLaughlin won the US Trail marathon championships.
