= Easy Money Creek =

Stream in Yukon–Koyukuk Census Area, Alaska, U.S.

Coordinates: 64°27′15″N 155°11′10″W

Easy Money Creek is a stream in Yukon–Koyukuk Census Area, Alaska, in the United States.

Prospectors likely coined the name Easy Money Creek which was recorded by the United States Geological Survey in 1912.

== See also ==
- List of rivers of Alaska
