= H Is for Hellgate =

Indie pop band

H is for Hellgate
- Origin: Seattle, Washington
- Genres: Indie pop
- Years active: 2007–2009
- Labels: Stereotype Records, Scissor City Sound
- Members: Jamie Henkensiefken, also known as Jamie Hellgate and Jamie Aaron Aux (guitar/lead vocals), Ben Baier (bass guitar), Jon Jacobson (drums)
- Past members: Marie Calderon (drums), and David Thomas (guitar/vocals)

H is for Hellgate was an indie pop band based in Seattle, active from 2007 until breaking up in 2009.

== History ==
H is for Hellgate's frontwoman, Jamie Henkensiefken, moved to Seattle from Missoula, Montana in 2002. The band released two studio albums during its 2 years of activity. The first was released on Stereotype Records and the second was released on Scissor City Sound. The band's name derives from a canyon in Missoula. The first was self-titled and was released on February 15, 2007. The second of these albums was entitled "Come for the Peaks, Stay for the Valleys" and was released on December 2, 2008 and produced by Mark Mercer. Their first album was home recorded and their second was recorded at Avast! Recording Company. The band broke up in July 2009, and played their last show on the 23rd of that month at Seattle's Comet Tavern. Both their albums were reviewed by Robert Christgau. Baier is also affiliated with another band, entitled We Wrote the Book on Connectors. Jamie is currently a member of another band, entitled Eighteen Individual Eyes.

== Critical reception ==
The Eugene Weekly compared some of H Is for Hellgate's music to that of At the Drive-In, as well as Sleater-Kinney, and compared Henkensiefken's vocals to Alison Mosshart's. The Seattle PI's Gene Stout wrote that their musical style was "A fascinating blend of folk, pop, indie rock, progressive rock and classical, with a hefty dose of riot grrrl energy."

=== H is for Hellgate (2007) ===
Out There Monthly reviewed their self-titled debut and wrote, "Jamie Henkensiefken’s undeniably loveable and soulful vocals, much like Jamie herself, are the bread and butter of H." Another review of this album came from Three Imaginary Girls, which gave the album a 5.6 out of 10 and wrote "H is for Hellgate almost appears to be two separate bands. The first is a rock band that uses lots of different timing changes and is driven by guitars, primarily. This band reminds me of Silversun Pickups or Metric. The second H is for Hellgate is a vocal-based pop band in the vein of Death Cab for Cutie." Megan Seling of the Stranger was less favorable in her assessment of the album, describing it as "less-than-memorable".

=== Come for the Peaks, Stay for the Valleys (2008) ===
Nada Mucho ranked Come for the Peaks, Stay for the Valleys as the 6th best Seattle album of 2008. In addition, Three Imaginary Girls ranked the album as the 23rd best Northwest release of 2008. When Robert Christgau reviewed this album, he wrote, "Woman tells her bitter truths, which her guitar elaborates, or is it challenges?" Another positive review of their second album came from the Missoula Independent, who wrote that "each song is beautifully crafted" and compared Henkensiefken favorably to Liz Phair. Seattle Magazine wrote that their second album "...showcases the band’s—and in particular, lead singer Jamie Henkensiefken’s—ability to move seamlessly between punk rants (think Sleater-Kinney), alt-folk ballads (à la Laura Veirs) and the tricky time signatures of prog rock (like The Dismemberment Plan). The surprising mix will keep your ears on their toes." Megan Seling reviewed the album favorably in the Stranger, writing that "Hellgate's pounding drumming and wiry guitar work nod to turbulent '90s post-rock, but some songs ("Blood," for instance) come with a somber Pacific Northwest vibe. "Copernicus and Me" is dark and drilling; "Dusk at Devil's Tower" is one part Jawbox, one part Bikini Kill."

== Discography ==
- H Is for Hellgate (Stereotype, 2007)
- Come For the Peaks, Stay For the Valleys (Scissor City Sound, 2008)
