= Holly Page =

American runner

Personal information
- Nationality: United States
- Born: August 13, 1993 (age 32) Orlando, Florida, U.S.
- Home town: Maitland, Florida, U.S.
- Height: 5 ft 7 in (1.70 m)

Sport
- Sport: Track, long-distance running
- Event(s): 1500 meters, mile, 5000 meters, 10,000 meters
- College team: Wyoming Cowboys and Cowgirls
- Turned pro: 2015

Achievements and titles
- Personal best(s): 1500 meters: 4:35.49 5000 meters: 16:16.17 10,000 meters: 33:49.66
- Updated on 11–7–15

Holly Page (born August 13, 1993) is an American middle-distance and long-distance runner. While attending the University of Wyoming, Page was a two-time NCAA Division I All-Mountain Region cross country and Track and field runner.

== Bishop Moore High School ==
Page was an eight-time state finalist in cross country and Track and field in Florida High School Athletic Association 2A.

== University of Wyoming ==
Page placed 1st all-time in University of Wyoming 10,000 metres history, 2nd in 5000 metres history and 9th in 1500 metres outdoor history. Page placed 1st all-time in University of Wyoming indoor 5000 metres and 3000 metres.

== International ==
Page qualified to represent the United States. She competed in Athletics at the 2015 Summer Universiade – Women's 5000 metres where she placed 12th.
