= UTMB Mont-Blanc =

Annual trail-running event week in Chamonix, France

UTMB Mont-Blanc HOKA UTMB Mont-Blanc
- Status: Active
- Genre: Trail running / Ultramarathon
- Frequency: Annual
- Locations: Chamonix, France
- Country: France
- Years active: 2003–present
- Founder: Catherine Poletti and Michel Poletti
- Participants: More than 10,000 runners across the event week
- Organizer: UTMB Group
- Website: montblanc.utmb.world

UTMB Mont-Blanc is an annual trail running and ultramarathon event week based in Chamonix, France. The event is centred on races around Mont Blanc and through the Alps of France, Italy and Switzerland.

UTMB Mont-Blanc is the event in which the UTMB World Series Finals take place. Since 2023, three races held during the Chamonix week have served as the Finals of the UTMB World Series: OCC as the 50K Final, CCC as the 100K Final and the original Ultra-Trail du Mont-Blanc race, usually called UTMB, as the 100M Final.

The event week also includes other races, such as TDS, MCC, ETC, YCC and PTL. The original UTMB race was first held in 2003 and follows a roughly 170 km route around Mont Blanc. As the event grew, demand for places exceeded the available field size. UTMB Mont-Blanc therefore introduced an entry process based on qualifying points and a lottery in 2008.

Under the current UTMB World Series system, most runners enter the Finals lottery by holding a valid UTMB Index in the relevant race category and at least one Running Stone. Running Stones are earned by finishing UTMB World Series Events or Majors and function as lottery entries for the Chamonix Finals. Elite runners can also gain access through direct qualification pathways, including results at UTMB World Series Majors and Events.

== History ==
The original Ultra-Trail du Mont-Blanc race was founded by Catherine and Michel Poletti and first held in 2003. The first race followed the route of the Tour du Mont Blanc, beginning and ending in Chamonix and passing through France, Italy and Switzerland.

The event expanded during the 2000s and 2010s from a single long-distance race into a multi-race festival. CCC, a route from Courmayeur through Champex to Chamonix, became one of the principal races of the week, while OCC, TDS and PTL added shorter, longer and team-based formats around the Mont-Blanc region.

Doug Mayer's 2023 book The Race That Changed Running: The Inside Story of the UTMB describes the growth of the Chamonix race from a local mountain ultramarathon into one of the central institutions of international trail running. The event also became the symbolic centre of the UTMB brand, which later expanded into the UTMB World Series, a global circuit of trail-running events.

In 2021, UTMB Group and The IRONMAN Group announced the UTMB World Series, which began in 2022. Under the new structure, UTMB Mont-Blanc became the annual finals week of the circuit, with OCC, CCC and UTMB serving as the finals for the 50K, 100K and 100M categories.

== Event week ==
UTMB Mont-Blanc is held annually in late August or early September, with races and associated events based around Chamonix and nearby towns in the Mont-Blanc region. The event brings together elite athletes, recreational runners, crews, volunteers, spectators and media from across the international trail-running community.

The official event website describes UTMB Mont-Blanc as including more than 10,000 runners across eight races, including the UTMB World Series Finals. The event week includes race starts in Chamonix, Courmayeur, Orsières, Martigny-Combe and other locations, with several races finishing in Chamonix.

The week is also associated with live coverage, athlete media events, sponsor activations, public exhibitions and fan gatherings. Runner's World, Outside, iRunFar and other running media have published previews, race reports, viewing guides and results coverage from UTMB Mont-Blanc week.

== Races ==
The race programme changes from year to year, but UTMB Mont-Blanc has included the following principal races:

Race	Name or route	Category	Description	Ref.
UTMB	Ultra-Trail du Mont-Blanc	100M	Flagship race of approximately 170 km and 10,000 m of elevation gain around Mont Blanc through France, Italy and Switzerland; 100M Final of the UTMB World Series	
CCC	Courmayeur–Champex–Chamonix	100K	Race from Courmayeur to Chamonix via Champex; 100K Final of the UTMB World Series	
OCC	Orsières–Champex–Chamonix	50K	Race from Orsières to Chamonix via Champex; 50K Final of the UTMB World Series	
TDS	Sur les Traces des Ducs de Savoie	100M / long ultra	Mountain ultramarathon linking the Aosta Valley and the Savoie region with a more technical profile than the main UTMB route	
PTL	La Petite Trotte à Léon	Team event	Long-distance team event around the Mont-Blanc region	
MCC	Martigny-Combe–Chamonix	40K range	Race from the Swiss side of the Mont-Blanc region toward Chamonix	
ETC	ETC Trail	20K range	Short trail race associated with the event week	
YCC	Youth Chamonix Courmayeur	Youth race	Youth race programme connected to UTMB Mont-Blanc week	

== UTMB World Series Finals ==
The UTMB World Series Finals are held during UTMB Mont-Blanc week in Chamonix. The Finals are organized by race category: OCC is the 50K Final, CCC is the 100K Final and UTMB is the 100M Final.

The Finals structure links the Chamonix event week to the wider UTMB World Series. Runners can qualify or gain access through the UTMB World Series system, including the UTMB Index and Running Stones. The 100M Final remains the original UTMB race around Mont Blanc, while OCC and CCC function as championship races for shorter categories within the same event week.

== Organization ==
UTMB Mont-Blanc is organized by UTMB Group. Since 2021, UTMB Group has partnered with The IRONMAN Group on the UTMB World Series.

The event is supported by public authorities, local communities, volunteers, commercial partners and international media operations. The race week uses mountain trails, public roads, aid stations, timing systems, safety systems and environmental rules across France, Italy and Switzerland.

The event has also become central to debates about the professionalization and commercialization of trail running. Le Monde described UTMB as having become an international group and reported criticism from some race organizers and members of the trail-running community over expansion, event acquisitions and franchising strategy.

== Media coverage and significance ==
UTMB Mont-Blanc has been widely covered by international newspapers, broadcasters, running magazines and specialist endurance outlets. The Guardian has described the Mont Blanc ultra as one of the world's most famous trail races, while BBC Sport described UTMB as a major 100-mile race crossing three countries and one of the largest trail-running events in the world.

Runner's World has covered UTMB Mont-Blanc through athlete features, viewing guides and results reports, including coverage of Tom Evans, Ruth Croft, Jim Walmsley and Courtney Dauwalter.

iRunFar has published extensive coverage of the race week, including previews, interviews and results for UTMB, OCC, CCC and TDS.

Outside has described UTMB as central to the professional trail-running calendar, publishing coverage of the race's history, safety, live broadcasts, route previews and professional prize-money debates.

French media have also covered UTMB Mont-Blanc as both a major sporting event and an international endurance business. L'Équipe has published race previews, route updates, broadcast information and environmental coverage related to UTMB Mont-Blanc.

== See also ==
- Ultra-Trail du Mont-Blanc
- UTMB World Series
- UTMB World Series Finals
- UTMB Index
- Trail running
- Ultramarathon
- Chamonix
- Mont Blanc
