= Grant Barnette =

American ultrarunner and endurance athlete

Personal information
- Born: March 31, 1996 (age 30) Lenoir, North Carolina, U.S.
- Website: RunWithGrant.com

Sport
- Country: United States
- Sport: Ultra Running, Trail Running, Ski Mountaineering
- Team: Craft Elite Run Team
- Turned pro: 2022

Grant Barnette (born March 31, 1996) is an American ultrarunner, trail runner and ski mountaineering athlete.

== Early life and career ==
Barnette attended West Caldwell High School in Lenoir, North Carolina. While in high school he was on the soccer, wrestling, track and field, and cross country teams.

He attended Mars Hill University, where he competed in both indoor and outdoor track and field, as well as cross country.

After hiking the Appalachian Trail in 2016 and the Pacific Crest Trail in 2017, he transitioned to ultrarunning, gaining recognition for his performances in UTMB World Series events such as the Grindstone 100 Miler and the Speedgoat 50K.

== Notable race results ==
2025 Notable Results
Place	Race	Distance	Location
5th	Ultra-trail Cape Town (UTCT)	100 km	(South Africa) Cape Town, ZA
5th	Speedgoat by UTMB	50 km	(United States) Snowbird, UT
2nd	Twisted Fork Trail Festival	68 km	(United States) Park City, UT
1st	Antelope Island Buffalo Run	50 km	(United States) Syracuse, UT

2024 Notable Results
Place	Race	Distance	Location
1st	DC Peaks 50	50M	(United States) Kaysville, UT
5th	Speedgoat by UTMB	50 km	(United States) Snowbird, UT

2023 Notable Results
Place	Race	Distance	Location
2nd	Grindstone by UTMB	100M	(United States) Swoope, VA
1st	Telluride Mountain Race	40M	(United States) Telluride, CO
5th	Broken Arrow Skyrace	46 km	(United States) Lake Tahoe, CA
1st	Quest for the Crest	50 km	(United States) Burnsville, NC

2022 Notable Results
Place	Race	Distance	Location
1st	South Mountains Marathons	50 km	(United States) Connelly Springs, NC
1st	HURL Elkhorn	50 km	(United States) Helena, MT
1st	Duncan Ridge Trail	50 km	(United States) Blairsville, GA

2021 Notable Results
Place	Race	Distance	Location
1st	The Uncharted	50 km	(United States) Shelby, NC
3rd	Never Summer	100 km	(United States) Gould, CO
4th	Run The Rock	50 km	(United States) Terrebonne, OR

2020 Notable Results
Place	Race	Distance	Location
2nd	No Business 100 Miler	100M	(United States) Jamestown, TN
2nd	Fort Yargo Ultra	50 km	(United States) Winder, GA
