= UTMB World Series Finals =

Championship races of the UTMB World Series

- Sport: Trail running / Ultramarathon
- Founded: 2022
- Organizing body: UTMB Group
- Region: Chamonix, France
- Qualification: UTMB Index and Running Stones
- Related competitions: UTMB World Series, Ultra-Trail du Mont-Blanc
- Website: utmb.world/finals

The UTMB World Series Finals are the championship races of the UTMB World Series, held annually during UTMB Mont-Blanc week in Chamonix, France.

The Finals are organized across three race categories: OCC serves as the 50K Final, CCC serves as the 100K Final, and the Ultra-Trail du Mont-Blanc race serves as the 100M Final. The Finals are connected to the original Ultra-Trail du Mont-Blanc race, first held in 2003 around Mont Blanc, but form part of the later World Series system launched in 2022.

The Finals are the highest level of the UTMB World Series structure. Men's and women's World Series titles are awarded in each of the three categories.

== Races ==
The Finals take place during UTMB Mont-Blanc week in the Alps. The three championship races are:

| Race | Category | Route | Notes | Ref. |
|---|---|---|---|---|
| OCC | 50K | Orsières–Champex–Chamonix | Annual 50K category final of the UTMB World Series | |
| CCC | 100K | Courmayeur–Champex–Chamonix | Annual 100K category final of the UTMB World Series | |
| UTMB | 100M | Loop around Mont Blanc, starting and finishing in Chamonix | Annual 100M category final of the UTMB World Series | |

The Finals are distinct from the broader UTMB Mont-Blanc race week, which also includes other races such as TDS, MCC, ETC, YCC and PTL. Within the World Series system, OCC, CCC and UTMB are the races that award World Series titles.

== Qualification and entry ==
Entry to the UTMB World Series Finals is based on a combination of a valid UTMB Index and Running Stones, except for elite runners who qualify directly through World Series races. The UTMB Index is a performance-rating system used in the UTMB World Series. It assesses runners in the 20K, 50K, 100K and 100M categories and is used to establish eligibility for the Finals lottery. A valid Index can be obtained by finishing a UTMB World Series race or a UTMB Index race in the relevant category. Running Stones function as entries in the lottery for the Finals. They are earned by finishing races at UTMB World Series Events or UTMB World Series Majors. UTMB states that a runner must have at least one Running Stone and a valid UTMB Index to enter the UTMB Mont-Blanc lottery for the Finals.

== Direct qualification ==
Elite athletes can qualify directly for the Finals through results at UTMB World Series Events and Majors. World Series Events provide direct qualification for the top three male and female finishers in the 50K, 100K and 100M categories, while Majors provide expanded access, including the top ten male and female finishers in those categories and age-group winners.

== History ==
The Finals system was introduced as part of the creation of the UTMB World Series, announced in May 2021 by UTMB Group and The IRONMAN Group. The World Series began in 2022 as a global circuit of trail-running events connected to UTMB Mont-Blanc in Chamonix. The structure repositioned the Chamonix races as championship finals for the wider circuit. OCC, CCC and UTMB became the 50K, 100K and 100M Finals respectively, while races around the world became World Series Events, Majors or Index races connected to the same qualification system.

== See also ==
- UTMB World Series
- Ultra-Trail du Mont-Blanc
- Trail running
- Ultramarathon
