= Grindstone 100 Miler =

100 mile ultramarathon

- Location: (United States) Swoope, Virginia
- Event type: Ultramarathon
- Distance: 101.85 miles (163.91 km)
- Primary sponsor: UTMB
- Organizer: Dr. Clark Zealand (Race Director)
- Website: Grindstone Running Festival

Grindstone 100 Miler is an annual 100 mile long ultramarathon that takes place on trails in Virginia's Allegheny Mountains, usually held during the end of September.

The race starts at Camp Shenandoah, a local camp of the Boy Scouts of America. Beginning at Camp Shenandoah, this out-n-back course ascends and descends Little North Mountain before climbing over 2,400 ft (730 m) in 4 miles (6.4 km) to the summit of Elliott Knob.

The course then proceeds north following the ridgeline of the Great North Mountain range, crossing over to and following the Wild Oak Trail before continuing north to the summit of Reddish Knob.

Runners continue north to Briery Branch Gap before retracing their steps (without summiting Elliott & Reddish) back along the course to Camp Shenandoah. Runners climb a cumulative total of 23,200 feet (7,100 m) and descend a total of 23,200 feet (7,100 m) on mountain trails before reaching the finish.

All sub-38 hour finishers receive a Grindstone 100 Belt Buckle, and a finishers shirt. First place overall male and female runners will receive the Grindstone Champion's trophy. Special awards are also given out to the top 5 male and female finishers, first place male and female masters (40-49), grand masters (50-59) and male super masters (60 and over) and Best Blood.

Grindstone is the fourth race in the Beast Series, which comprises six races: Holiday Lake 50 km, Terrapin Mountain 50 km, Promise Land 50 km, Grindstone 100M, Mountain Masochist Trail Run 50 miler, and the Hellgate 100 km.

In 2023, it was rebranded as Grindstone Trail Running Festival by UTMB and became part of the UTMB World Series Finals.

The race is a triple qualifier for UTMB Mont-Blanc, Western States Endurance Run and the Hardrock Hundred Mile Endurance Run.

== Results ==
=== 2026 ===
100M - Men
Place	Name
1	(United States) Jordan Buck
2	(United States) Spencer Imbach
3	(United States) Chris Aldrich

100M - Women
Place	Name
1	(United States) Katti Jackson
2	(United States) Jessie George
3	(United States) Sarah Gage

=== 2025 ===
100M - Men
Place	Name
1	(United States) Christopher Sobie
2	(Canada) Yannick Bernard
3	(United States) Nick Luden

100M - Women
Place	Name
1	(United States) Isabelle Danforth
2	(United States) Justine Koksal
3	(United States) Celia Nalbach

=== 2024 ===
100M - Men
Place	Name
1	(United States) Gavin Prior
2	(United States) Anton Krupicka
3	(United States) Alex Proctor

100M - Women
Place	Name
1	(United States) Katti Jackson
2	(United States) Jill Dennes
3	(United States) Tatiana Rypinski

=== 2023 ===
100M - Men
Place	Name
1	(United States) Mike McMonagle
2	(United States) Grant Barnette
3	(United States) Joe Miller

100M - Women
Place	Name
1	(Canada) Alissa St. Laurent
2	(United States) Shelby Johnson
3	(United States) Serena Eley

=== 2022 ===
100M - Men
Place	Name
1	(United States) Daniel Frank
2	(United States) Andrew Macgibbon
3	(United States) Nicholas Wirz

100M - Women
Place	Name
1	(United States) Shannon Cebron
2	(United States) Meridith Ussery
3	(United States) Meg Landymore
