= Anna Mae Flynn =

American ultrarunner

Personal information
- Nationality: American
- Born: Banner Elk, North Carolina
- Website: www.MountainEnduranceLife.com

Sport
- Country: United States
- Sport: Ultrarunning
- Event: Ultramarathon
- Team: Hoka One One
- Turned pro: 2017
- Coached by: Self

Anna Mae Flynn is an ultrarunner and ultrarunning coach based in Lake Tahoe, California. Flynn was the female winner of the 2017 and 2019 Speedgoat 50k.

== Notable race results ==
2012

- Rodeo Valley Trail Run 1/2 Marathon December 30, 2012 - 3rd Female (15th overall), 2:08:07

2013

- Knickerbocker Canyon Trail Run 1/2 Marathon March 24, 2013 - 1st Female (5th overall) 2:01:00
- Escape From Prison Hill 1/2 Marathon April 20, 2013 - 4th Female (17th overall), 2:02:19

2014

- Switchback Challenge 11k October 11, 2014 - 1st Female (8th overall), 00:54:22
- The North Face Endurance Challenge San Francisco 1/2 Marathon December 6, 2014 - 2nd Female (16th overall), 1:39:57

2015

- Way Too Cool 50k March 7, 2015 - 4th Female (34 overall), 4:00:37
- Canyons Endurance Run by UTMB 50k May 2, 2015 - 3rd Female (14th overall), 6:23:22
- Audi Power of Four 50k July 19, 2015 - 2nd Female (14th overall), 6:11:58
- The Nifty Fifty 50k August 15, 2015 - 1st Female (2nd overall), 4:41:45
- Run the Rut 50k September 5, 2015 - 5th Female (39th overall), 6:51:01
- Flagstaff Sky Peaks Vertical Km October 2, 2015 - 1st Female (7th overall), 00:57:37
- Moab Trail Marathon November 7, 2015 - 3rd Female (40th overall), 3:59:48

2016

- Way Too Cool 50k March 5, 2016 - 3rd Female (28th overall), 3:59:44
- Knickerbocker Canyon Trail Run 35k March 26, 2016 - 1st Female (3rd overall), 3:01:44
- Lake Sonoma 50 Miler April 9, 2016 - 3rd Female (17th overall), 7:28:22
- Silver State 50k May 21, 2016 - 1st Female (5th overall), 4:34:48

2017

- Quad Rock 50 miler May 13, 2017 - 3rd Female (7th overall), 8:40:23
- The Broken Arrow Skyrace 52k June 17, 2017 - 3rd Female (22nd overall), 6:08:09
- Speedgoat 50k July 29, 2017 - 1st Female (10th overall), 6:18:04

2019

- Lake Sonoma 50 miler April 13, 2019 - 1st Female (14th overall), 7:25:15
- Speedgoat 50k July 20, 2019 - 1st Female (15th overall), 6:30:15

2023

- The Broken Arrow Skyrace Vertical K June 16, 2023 - 5th Female (39th overall), 00:53:13
- Barr Trail Mountain Race 12.6 Miler July 16, 2023 - 3rd Female (11th overall), 01:58:29

2024

- Royal Gorge Groove 50k April 20, 2024 - 1st Female (7th overall), 5:04:45
