= Jim Walmsley =

American long-distance runner

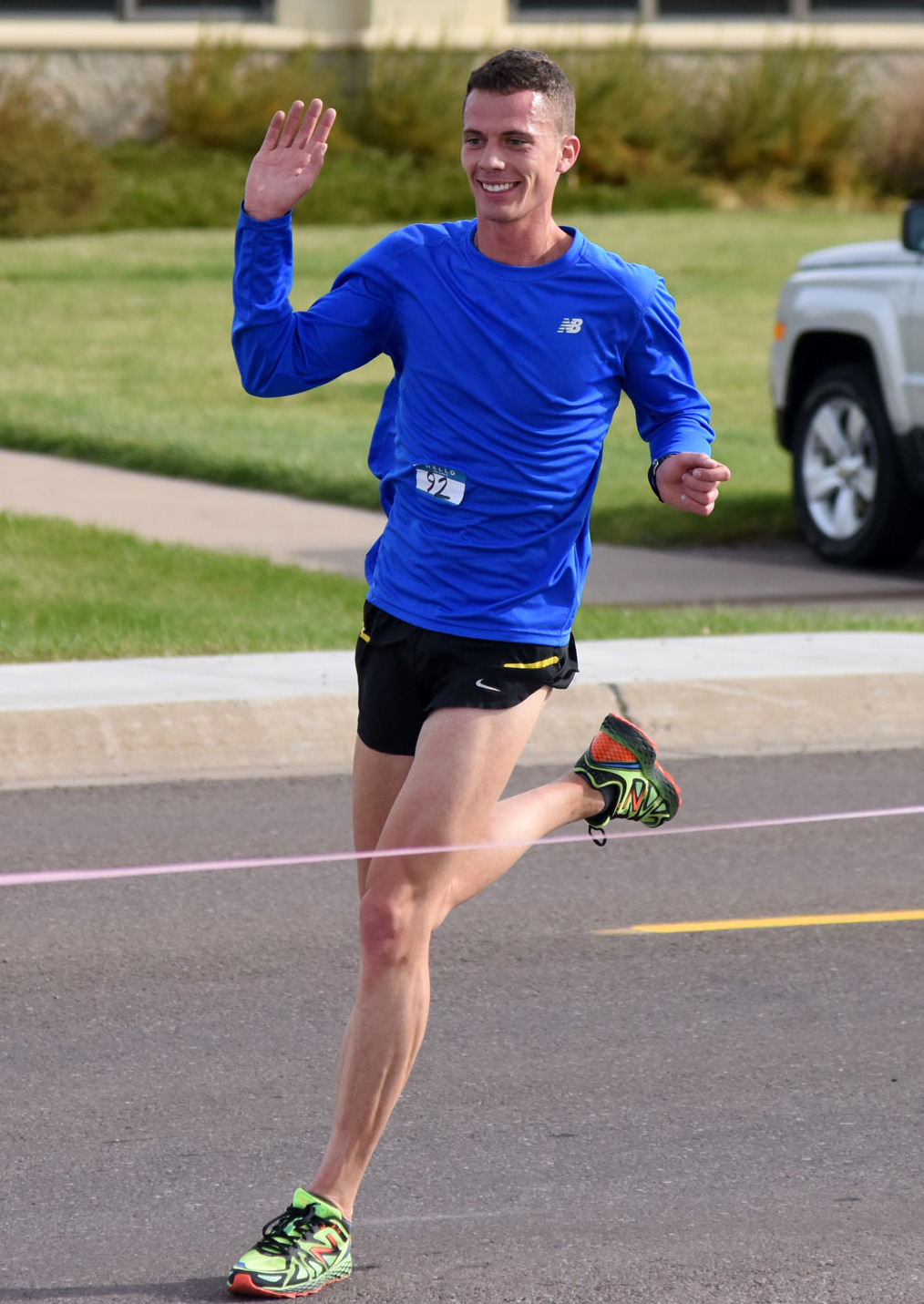

Personal information
- Born: 17 January 1990 (age 36) Phoenix, Arizona, United States
- Height: 1.85 m (6 ft 1 in)
- Weight: 68 kg (150 lb)

Sport
- Country: United States
- Events: Half-marathon, ultramarathon, trail running
- College team: Air Force Academy
- Team: Hoka

Achievements and titles
- Personal bests: 1500m: 3:48.16; 3000m st: 8:41.05; 5000m: 13:52.87; 10,000m: 29:08.88 ½-marathon: 1:04:00; Marathon: 2:15:05; 100km: 6:09:26

Jim Walmsley (born January 17, 1990) is an American long-distance runner. An ultra-trail specialist, his wins include the JFK 50 Mile in 2014, 2015 and 2016, the Lake Sonoma 50 in 2016 and 2018, the Tarawera Ultramarathon in 2017, and the Western States 100 in 2018, 2019, 2021, and 2024. In 2023, he became the first American man to win the Ultra-Trail du Mont-Blanc.

Walmsley has set 7 Fastest Known Time running records, including the speed record for the 44-mile Rim-to-Rim-to-Rim Grand Canyon crossing in 2016.

Sponsored by Hoka, Walmsley was named UltraRunner of the Year for four years in a row - 2016, 2017, 2018 and 2019. He also won UltraRunner of the Year in 2023 and 2025.

Walmsley qualified and ran in the 2020 Olympic trials in the marathon with his 2019 qualifying performance at the Houston half-marathon. While competing in the Hoka One One Project Carbon X 100K Challenge on May 5, 2019 he set a new world best for the 50 mile distance, completing it in 4:50:07 (besting Bruce Fordyce's previous 36-year old record by 14 seconds). Walmsley won the World Long Distance Mountain Running Championships in 2019.

In 2023, Walmsley won Ultra Trail de Mont Blanc UTMB in a course record of 19:37:43 becoming the first American man to win the race.

== Career ==
=== High school ===
Walmsley attended Horizon High School in Scottsdale, Arizona. In his senior year in 2007, he became Arizona's Division 5A-II cross country state champion, winning every race he ran in, and was named Runner of the Year. He finished 23rd in the national championships that year.

=== College ===
He considered attending Arizona State, Georgetown, Iona College, Washington, California and the Air Force Academy, eventually choosing the latter. During his 4 years there, from 2008 to 2012, he ran cross country and also took part in the 5000 meters, 10,000 meters, and steeplechase. In 2012, as the captain of the cross country and long-distance running teams, his best times were 4:04 for the mile, 13:52 for 5000m, 29:08 for 10000m and 8:41 for the 3000m steeplechase.

== Achievements ==
Year	Competition	Venue	Position	Event	Notes
2014	JFK 50 Mile	Washington County, Maryland, United States	1st	50 mile	5 h 56 min 31 s
2015	JFK 50 Mile	Washington County, Maryland, United States	1st	50 mile	5 h 47 min 37 s
2016	Bandera 100K	Bandera County, Texas, United States	1st	100 km	7 h 46 min 37 s
2016	Moab Red Hot 55K	Moab, Utah, United States	1st	55 km	3 h 49 min 20 s
2016	Lake Sonoma 50	Healdsburg, California, United States	1st	50 mile	6 h 00 min 52 s
2016	JFK 50 Mile	Washington County, Maryland, United States	1st	50 mile	5 h 21 min 29 s
2017	Tarawera Ultramarathon	New Zealand	1st	100 km	7 h 23 min 32 s
2017	Gorge Waterfalls 100K	Cascade Locks, Oregon, United States	1st	100 km	8 h 20 min 28 s
2017	Kendall Mountain Run	Silverton, Colorado, United States	1st	12 mile	1 h 31 min 05 s
2017	Speedgoat 50K	Little Cottonwood Canyon, Utah, United States	1st	50 km	5 h 04 min 55 s
2017	UTMB	Chamonix, France	5th	167 km	20 h 11 min 38 s
2018	Lake Sonoma 50	Healdsburg, California, United States	1st	50 mile	5 h 51 min 16 s
2018	Western States 100	Olympic Valley, California, United States	1st	100 mile	14 h 30 min 04 s
2019	Houston half-marathon	Houston, Texas, United States	27th	half-marathon	1 h 04 min 00 s
2019	Hong Kong Fast 50 Ultra	Hong Kong	1st	50 mile	6 h 05 min 00 s
2019	Western States 100	Olympic Valley, California, United States	1st	100 mile	14 h 09 min 28 s
2019	Ultravasan	Mora, Dalarna, Sweden	1st	90 km	5 h 47 min 28 s
2020	U.S. Olympic Marathon Trials	Atlanta, Georgia, United States	22nd	marathon	2 h 15 min 05 s
2021	Hoka One One Project Carbon X	Phoenix, Arizona, United States	1st	100 km	6 h 09 min 26 s
2021	Western States 100	Olympic Valley, California, United States	1st	100 mile	14 h 46 min 01 s
2021	Ultra-trail Cape Town	Cape Town, South Africa	1st	100 km	9 h 47 min 20 s
2022	UTMB	Chamonix, France	4th	167 km	21 h 12 min 12 s
2023	UTMB	Chamonix, France	1st	172 km	19 h 37 min 43 s
2024	Western States 100	Olympic Valley, California, United States	1st	100 mile	14 h 13 min 45 s
2025	Ultra Trail Chianti Castles (UTCC) by UTMB	Radda in Chianti, Italy	1st	120 km	9 h 59 min 48 s
2025	UTMB OCC	Chamonix, France	1st	61 km	5 h 00 min 35 s
2025	World Mountain and Trail Running Championships - Long Trail	Canfranc, Spain	1st	81.2 km	8 h 35 min 11 s

== Records ==
Course records set by Jim Walmsley
Event	Time	Date
JFK 50	5 h 21 min 28 s	19 November 2016
Lake Sonoma 50	6 h 00 min 52 s	9 April 2016
Lake Sonoma 50	5 h 51 min 16 s — current record	14 April 2018
Bandera 100K	7 h 46 min 37 s — current record	9 January 2016
Tarawera Ultramarathon	7 h 23 min 32 s — current record	11 February 2017
Western States 100	14 h 30 min 04 s	23 June 2018
Western States 100	14 h 09 min 28 s	29 June 2019
Ultra-Trail du Mont-Blanc	19 h 37 min 43 s — current record	2 September 2023
