= Sunseri =

Sunseri is a surname. Notable people with the surname include:

- John Sunseri (born 1969), American writer
- Michelino Sunseri, American ultrarunner
- Rodolfo Padilla Sunseri, Honduran politician
- Sal Sunseri (born 1959), American football coach
- Tino Sunseri (born 1988), American football player and coach
- Vinnie Sunseri (born 1991), American football player and coach
