= Lucy Bartholomew =

Australian ultramarathon runner

- Lucy Bartholomew in 2026, speaking at an event in London

Personal information
- Full name: Lucy Bartholomew
- Nationality: Australian
- Born: 20 May 1996 (age 30) Melbourne, Victoria, Australia

Sport
- Sport: Trail running, Triathlon
- Events: Ultramarathon, Ironman Triathlon

Lucy Bartholomew (born 20 May 1996) is an Australian ultramarathon runner and endurance athlete who has achieved international recognition in trail ultrarunning and triathlon.

== Early years ==
Bartholomew was born in Melbourne, Victoria, Australia on 20 May 1996. Inspired by her father, Ash Bartholomew, an ultrarunner, Lucy developed an early love of trail running. At age 15, she completed her first 100-kilometer ultramarathon alongside her father, finishing in approximately 12 and a half hours. This formative experience sparked her lifelong passion for ultradistance running.

== Achievements ==
Bartholomew rose to prominence in the ultrarunning world as a teenager, quickly becoming known for her strength in mountain and trail races.

- In 2017, she won both Ultra-Trail Australia 100 km and Ultra-Trail Cape Town 100 km; placed second in the 80 km Marathon du Mont Blanc.
- In 2018, she finished third at the Western States 100-mile Endurance Run in the United States, one of the world's most prestigious ultramarathons.
- In 2023, she completed the Ultra-Trail du Mont-Blanc (UTMB) 171 km in 27:39:23, placing 10th in her age group. She also competed in her first Ironman triathlon (Ironman Western Australia), finishing fourth in her age group and qualifying for the Ironman World Championship in Kona, Hawaii, United States.
- Later in 2023, she became the second woman ever to complete both the UTMB and Ironman World Championship in the same year, finishing the Ironman Kona in 10:43:41.

== Results ==
Place	Race	Distance	Date	Time
Gold	Ultra-Trail Australia	100 km	20 May 2017	10 h 52 min 35 s
Silver	Marathon du Mont Blanc	80 km	23 June 2017	13 h 23 min 12 s
Gold	Ultra-Trail Cape Town	100 km	2 December 2017	11 h 21 min 49 s
Bronze	Western States Endurance Run	100 mi	23 June 2018	18 h 59 min 45 s
Gold	Tarawera Ultramarathon Miler	165.2 km	11 February 2023	17 h 13 min 27 s
Silver	Ultra-Trail Australia	100 km	13 May 2023	11 h 52 min 41 s
Silver	Ultra-Trail Australia	100 km	18 May 2024	11 h 00 min 34 s
Silver	Ultra-Trail Kosciuszko by UTMB - Kosci 50	50 km	27 November 2025	4 h 32 min 13 s
Silver	Transvulcania	73 km	9 May 2026	7 h 49 min 26 s
Silver	Lavaredo Ultra Trail	120 km	26 June 2026	13 h 34 min 59 s

== Personal bests ==
- 100 kilometers trail – 10:01:06 (Tarawera Ultramarathon, 2025).
- 100 miles trail – 17:13:27 (Tarawera Ultramarathon, 2023).
- Ironman triathlon – 10:43:41 (Ironman Kona, 2023).
- UTMB 171 km – 27:39:23 (UTMB 2023).
- Marathon - 02:47:06 (Brisbane marathon 2026).
