= DC Peaks 50 =

50 mile ultramarathon

- Location: (United States) Kaysville, Utah
- Event type: Ultramarathon
- Distance: 50M, 55K, 25K
- Primary sponsor: Rockstar Energy
- Established: 2021
- Organizer: Jake Kilgore and Mick Garrison
- Course records: 7:35:06 - Grant Barnette (2024)
- Website: DC Peaks 50

The DC Peaks 50 is an annual race series held in Kaysville, Utah that offers 100M, 50M, 55K and 25K trailrunning races.

The flagship 50 mile race starts near the East Mountain Wilderness Park in Kaysville. Runners traverse the Great Western Trail, go through several hiking trails in Mueller Park, and end at Tunnel Springs Park in North Salt Lake.

During the first race in 2021, DC Peaks 50 garnered national attention whenever it was abruptly called off three hours after the start due to a sudden blizzard. 87 runners had to be rescued or assisted off the course, but none were seriously harmed or injured.

== Results ==
=== 2025 ===
50M - Men
Place	Name	Time
1	(United States) Eli White	8:43:12
2	(United States) Matt Comi	8:55:00
3	(United States) Cody Robinson	9:23:00

50M - Women
Place	Name	Time
1	(United States) Ashley Moline	10:23:00
2	(United States) Astrid Lindgren	10:52:00
3	(United States) Kacy Nowak	11:22:00

=== 2024 ===
50M - Men
Place	Name	Time
1	(United States) Grant Barnette	7:35:06 (CR)
2	(United States) Zachary Garner	7:47:22
3	(United States) Alex Johnson	8:00:11

50M - Women
Place	Name	Time
1	(United States) Sabrina Stanley	8:52:24 (CR)
2	(United States) Marie Young	9:42:20
3	(United States) Ashley Moline	10:25:11

=== 2023 ===
50M - Men
Place	Name	Time
1	(United States) Adam Loomis	7:41:00
2	(United States) Tyler Weber	9:02:07
3	(United States) Devin Lang	9:07:57

50M - Women
Place	Name	Time
1	(United States) Elizabeth Butler	10:09:11
2	(United States) Maria Guy	10:29:40
3	(United States) Tara Miranda	10:36:26
