= La Breya =

Mountain of the Mont Blanc massif

- Location within Switzerland

Highest point
- Elevation: 2,374 m (7,789 ft)
- Prominence: 78 m (256 ft)
- Coordinates: 46°01′18″N 7°06′12″E

Geography
- Location: Valais, Switzerland
- Parent range: Mont Blanc Massif

La Breya (2,374 m) is a mountain of the Mont Blanc massif, overlooking Champex in the Swiss canton of Valais. It is accessible by chair lift from Champex, the upper station being located at Grands Plans (2,194 m). From there a trail leads to its summit.

The mountain is accessible by chairlift from Champex-Lac. The top station is located on a ridge near Grands Plans at an altitude of 2194 meters above sea level. From there, a trail leads to the summit. Another chairlift near Grands Plans , along with two ski lifts at the base station, comprise the Champex-Lac ski area. A trail leads from the top station to the two Swiss Alpine Club (SAC) huts, Cabane d'Orny and Cabane du Trient .
