= Lake Sonoma 50 =

Ultramarathon in California, United States

Lake Sonoma 50 is a 50-mile ultramarathon race held near Healdsburg, California. The course circumnavigates the Warm Springs arm of Lake Sonoma on hiking trails. It takes place annually on the second Saturday in April. The race was first run in 2008. In recent years it has become one of the most highly competitive ultramarathons in the United States.

== Registration ==
Registration is limited to only 400 runners. As a result, entry into the race is determined by lottery.

== Race and elevation profile ==
The Lake Sonoma 50 has a 14 hour time limit, with the gun-time being 6:30am on the day of the race.

According to the official course website, 86% of the course is single track, 9% dirt roads, and the first 2.4 miles on a paved road. There are twelve creek crossings and around 10,500 ft of elevation gain throughout the race.

== Aid stations ==
Aid stations and characteristics
Aid station name	Mile	Next aid station (miles)	Cut off time	Crew Access	Drop Bags
Island View	4.3	7.3		No	No
Warm Springs Creek	11.6	5.3		Yes	Yes
Wulfow	16.9	1.9		No	No
Madrone Point	18.8	6.4		Yes	No
No Name Flat	25.2	5.7	1:15 PM	Yes	Yes
Madrone Point	30.9	1.9		Yes	No
Wulfow	32.8	5.3		No	No
Warm Springs Creek	38.0	7.5	4:45 PM	Yes	Yes
Island View (full)	45.5	4.8	7:10 PM	No	No
Finish	50.29		8:30 PM	Yes	Yes

Stocked with normal ultra aid station fare including GU energy gels and products. The race directors ask that participants limit their drop bag to the size of a small shoe box.

== Race rules ==
Rules:

1. No littering
2. Be nice
3. Have Fun!

If a participant violates the no littering rule or is observed being rude or unsportsmanlike they will be disqualified from the race.

Furthermore, there is a zero tolerance policy regarding the use of performance-enhancing drugs.

No pacers are allowed during the duration of the race.

== Western States Endurance Run Golden Ticket race ==
The first two men and women finishers of the Lake Sonoma 50 mile race are rewarded a guaranteed entry into the Western States Endurance run. Because of this it is considered highly competitive in the ultra running community.

== Results ==
Key: Current course record

Edition	Year	Male winner	Country	Time (h:m:s)	Female winner	Country	Time (h:m:s)
15	2024	Francesco Puppi	Italy	6:30:17	Lindsay Allison	United States	8:44:11
14	2023	Drew Holmen	United States	6:44:20	Erin Clark	United States	7:49:27
13	2022	Matthew Seidel	United States	7:07:14	Brittany Charboneau	United States	7:27:14
12	2021	Mario Mendoza	United States	7:10:13	Keely Henninger	United States	7:40:20
-	2020	race cancelled due to pandemic					
11	2019	Jared Hazen	United States	6:08:29	Anna Mae Flynn	United States	7:13:55
10	2018	Jim Walmsley	United States	5:51:16	Keely Henninger	United States	7:13:55
9	2017	Sage Canaday	United States	6:17:55	YiOu Wang	United States	7:22:34
8	2016	Jim Walmsley	United States	6:00:52	YiOu Wang	United States	7:14:45
7	2015	Alex Varner	United States	6:09:39	Stephanie Howe Violett	United States	7:08:23
6	2014	Zach Miller	United States	6:11:10	Emily Harrison	United States	7:26:15
5	2013	Sage Canaday	United States	6:14:55	Cassie Scallon	United States	7:47:42
4	2012	Dakota Jones	United States	6:17:27	Joelle Vaught	United States	7:52:44
-	2011	race cancelled due to bad weather conditions					
3	2010	Hal Koerner	United States	7:08:20	Devon Crosby-Helms	United States	8:26:53
2	2009	Jonathan Olsen	United States	7:30:58	Suzanna Bon	United States	8:43:30
1	2008	Dan Barger	United States	8:24:31	Clare Abram	United States	9:44:13
