= Elliott Knob =

Mountain in Virginia

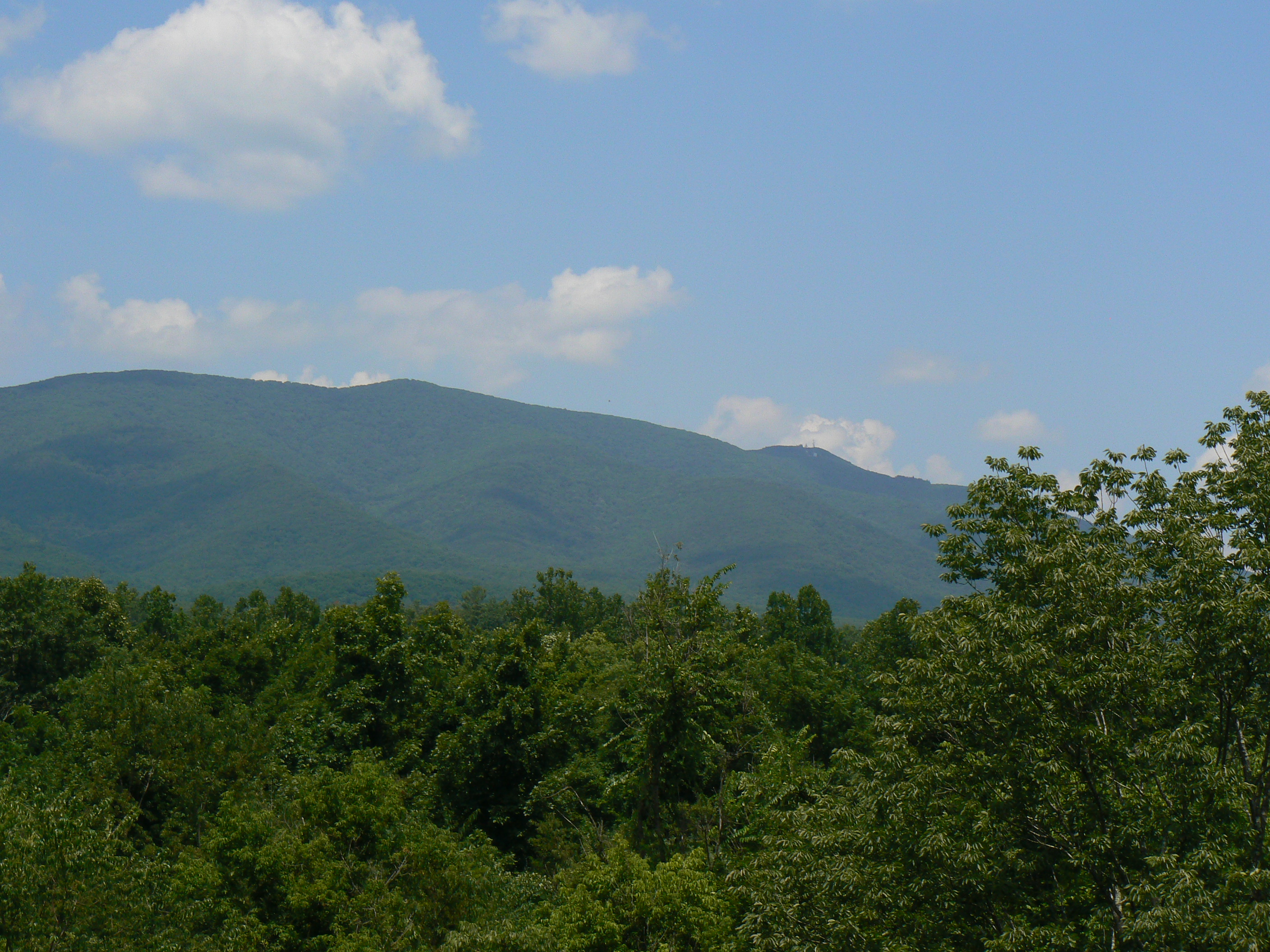
- Elliott Knob (summit on right)

Highest point
- Elevation: 4,463 ft (1,360 m)
- Prominence: 2,423 ft (739 m)
- Coordinates: 38°09′59″N 79°18′52″W

Geography
- Location within Virginia Location within the United States
- Location: Augusta County, Virginia, U.S.
- Parent range: Ridge-and-Valley Appalachians; Shenandoah Mountain
- Topo map: USGS Elliott Knob

Climbing
- First ascent: Prehistoric
- Easiest route: Hike

Elliott Knob is one of the highest mountains in the northern portions of the U.S. state of Virginia. At 4,463 ft (1,360 m), the peak is located on the ridge known as Great North Mountain. A subpeak known simply as "Hogback" (4,447 ft (1,355 m)) is located 0.5 mi (0.80 km) to the southwest. A small, naturally growing stand of red spruce trees is on the summit, and the upper slopes also have yellow birch and sugar maple, indicating that the altitude is just high enough to support tree species normally found hundreds of miles to the north. Otherwise oak and hickory trees are the most common types found on the mountain. The mountain is entirely within George Washington and Jefferson National Forests.

The area around the mountain is inhabited by a wide array of fauna including black bears, white-tailed deer and the elusive bobcat.

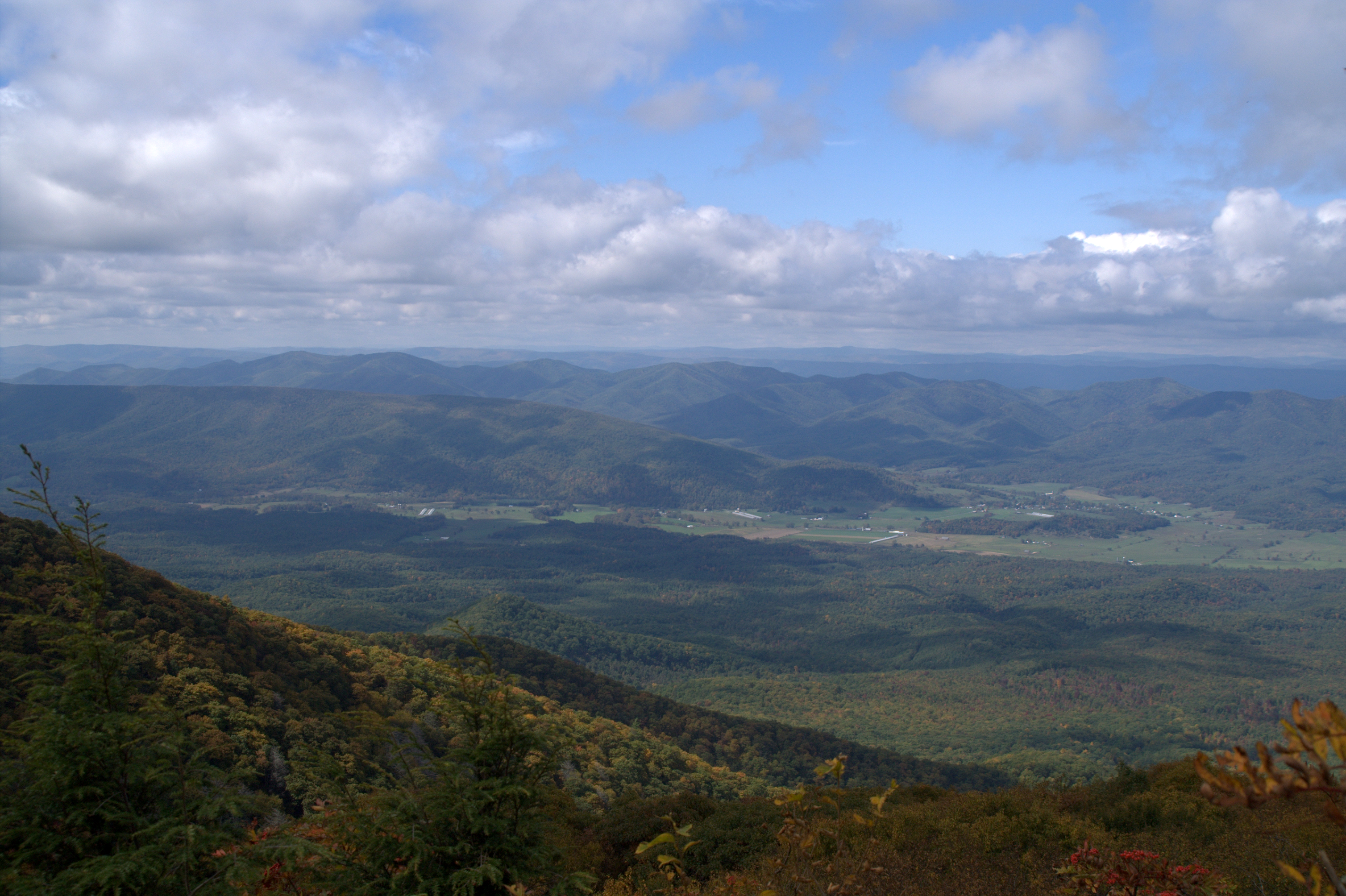
View looking west from the summit of Elliott Knob

A primitive jeep trail ascends the mountain from the east but it is also closed to public vehicles. The jeep trail is used by the Forest Service to gain access to a (closed) fire lookout on the summit and is very steep, rising over 2,000 ft (610 m) in less than 2.5 mi (4.0 km). Just 4 mi (6.4 km) to the south of the mountain lies the town of Augusta Springs, Virginia, which is 2,800 ft (850 m) below the summit. The only access for the public is on foot and along with the jeep trail, several other trails can be used to ascend to the top, each averaging 5 mi (8.0 km) in length and climbing up to 2,400 ft (730 m) from the trailheads. A small grassy cove is on the top and there is a spring 0.4 mi (0.64 km) below the summit which flows year round as well as a small man-made pond not far from the spring.

Right beside the base of the fire tower there is a National Geodetic Survey triangulation station disk. The entire firetower structure is enclosed within a fence with barbed wire at the top. However, there is evidence of people gaining entry in the form of holes under the fence and loose sections where the fence can be pulled up high enough for a person to crawl under, since the ground is only covered with grass in that area of the summit.

== Recreation ==
Elliott Knob is a popular day hike of 14 mi (23 km) for Boy Scouts who attend Camp Shenandoah. The route for the Grindstone 100 Miler ultramarathon includes the summit of Elliot Knob.

== Gallery ==
Elliott Knob in winter

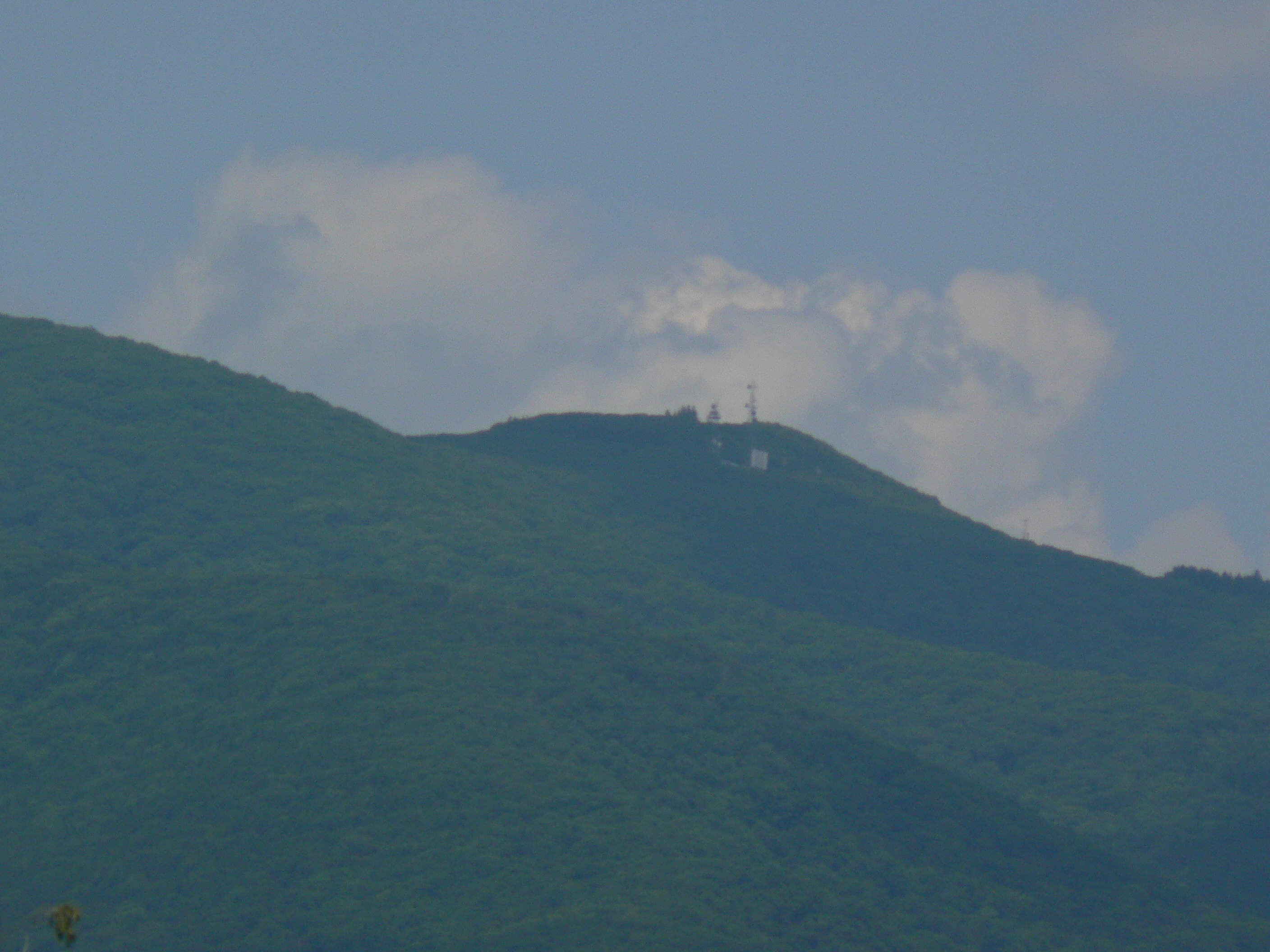
Radio towers below summit
