= Sage Canaday =

American long-distance runner (born 1985)

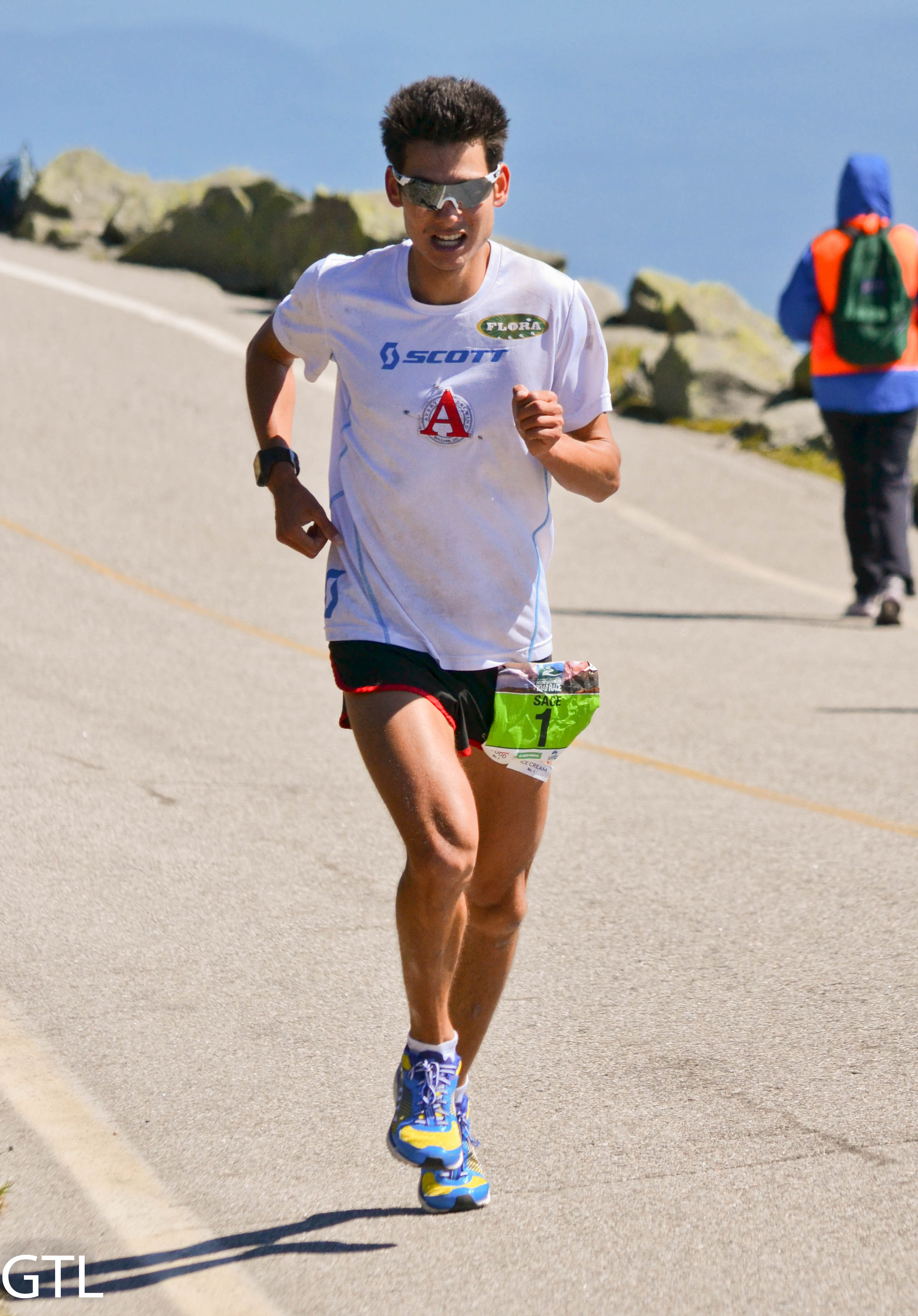
- Canaday at the 2013 Mount Washington Road Race

Personal information
- Born: 14 November 1985 (age 40) Oregon, United States
- Height: 5 ft 11 in (1.80 m)
- Weight: 150 lb (68 kg)
- Website: http://sagecanaday.com

Sport
- Country: United States
- Events: Marathon, ultramarathon, trail running
- College team: Cornell

Achievements and titles
- Personal bests: 10,000m: 29:47.39 ½ marathon: 1:04:32
- Updated on January 4, 2019

Sage Clifton Read Canaday (born November 14, 1985) is an American long-distance runner and ultramarathoner.

== Running career ==
=== High school and collegiate ===
Canaday attended Newberg High School in Newberg, Oregon, where he ran track and cross country. He then went on to run for Cornell University in Ithaca, New York, and at 21 was the youngest qualifier and runner at the 2008 U.S. Olympic Trials marathon, held in New York City on the same weekend as the 2007 New York City Marathon, and went on to win the Ivy League 10,000 meter championship in 2008. Canaday graduated from Cornell in 2009 with a Bachelor of Science in design.

=== Professional ===
After graduating from Cornell, Canaday began his professional running career as a marathoner for the Hansons-Brooks Distance Project, sponsored by Brooks Sports. While with Hansons-Brooks, Canaday set personal bests in both the half marathon (1:04:32 at the 2011 Rock 'n’ Roll Mardi Gras half marathon) and marathon (2:16:52 at the 2011 Rock 'n' Roll San Diego Marathon *Not Legal worldathletics.org). He qualified again for the Olympic Trials marathon, where he finished 43rd in 2:18:24 in 2012, but left Hansons-Brooks that February to pursue a career as an ultramarathoner.

Canaday wrote a book titled Running For The Hansons about his experience with Hansons-Brooks, published in 2011.

Canaday placed second at his debut ultramarathon in March after running off course for several minutes in the Chuckanut 50k in Bellingham, Washington, and won the USA Track & Field (USATF) Mountain Running Championship at the Mount Washington Road Race in June. That same year, he moved from the Hansons-Brooks base of Rochester Hills, Michigan to Boulder, Colorado, a major center for endurance athletes, and in October announced a sponsorship deal with SCOTT Sports, which replaced Brooks as his primary sponsor. Canaday's streak of ultramarathon success continued into 2013, when he won the USATF 100K Trail Championship in Bandera, Texas, the Speedgoat 50K, and Lake Sonoma 50, all in course records, as well as the Cayuga Trails 50 in Ithaca, New York and the 100K race at the Tarawera Ultramarathon in New Zealand.

Canaday has set 6 Fastest Known Time running records, including the speed record for the 28-mile Maroon Bells 4 Passes Loop in 2013.

In January 2014, Canaday announced a new primary sponsor, Hoka One One, a French running shoe company known for its "maximalist," highly cushioned shoes. Wearing Hoka One One shoes that year, Canaday replicated his victories at Tarawera and Speedgoat and also won the Pikes Peak Ascent in August, en route to winning the prestigious The North Face Endurance Challenge 50 mile race in December.

In 2015, Canaday re-focused on the marathon distance with the goal of qualifying for the 2016 Olympic Trials marathon. In March, he was 8th in the USATF marathon championship among American runners at the Los Angeles Marathon, in which he placed 12th overall, and was 16th overall at the Boston Marathon in April, though he fell short of an Olympic Trials qualifying time in both races. Canaday made a brief summer return to ultramarathoning for the Comrades Marathon, where he placed 15th, and Speedgoat, which he again won, before competing in the Ultra-Trail du Mont-Blanc–his first race of 100 miles–in late August, which he was forced to drop out of due to a knee injury. He would make two more Olympic Trials marathon qualifying attempts, at the California International Marathon in December and the Houston Marathon in January 2016, but failed to meet the qualifying standard of 2:19:00 before the January 17, 2016 deadline, with a season best time of 2:19:12 on a windy day at the Boston Marathon where he was 16th place overall.

He continued his ultra-marathon career in 2016, including his second 100-mile race and first finish at the distance, placing 11th at the Western States Endurance Run, having at one point been second and ahead of record course pace.

Through February 2020, Canaday continued to compete in both marathons and ultramarathons. In 2020 and 2021, the COVID-19 pandemic and personal health issues limited his ability to compete. By 2022, Canaday began racing again.

== Personal bests ==
Personal bests
Distance	Time	Location
5,000 meters	14:29.01	University Park, PA
10,000 meters	29:47.39	Lewisburg, PA
Half-marathon	1:04:32	New Orleans, LA
Marathon	2:16:52	San Diego, CA *Not legal, the course has a net downhill loss

== Achievements ==
Year	Competition	Venue	Position	Event	Notes
2012	Chuckanut 50K	USA	2nd	50 km	3:49:22
2012	Mount Washington Road Race	USA	1st	12.2 km	58:27
2012	White River	USA	1st	50 miles	6:16:10 (course record)
2012	UROC 100	USA	2nd	100 km	8:12:05
2013	Bandera 100K	USA	1st	100 km	8:13:49 (course record)
2013	Tarawera 100K	New Zealand	1st	100 km	8:53:34
2013	Lake Sonoma 50	USA	1st	50 miles	6:14:55
2013	Transvulcania	Spain	3rd	73.3 km	7:09:57
2013	Cayuga Trail 50	USA	1st	50 miles	6:47:48
2013	Mount Washington Road Race	USA	3rd	12.2 km	1:03:39
2013	Speedgoat	USA	1st	50 km	5:08:07
2014	Carlsbad Marathon	USA	2nd	26.2 miles	2:22:15
2014	Tarawera 69K	New Zealand	1st	69 km	5:33:38
2014	Northburn 50	New Zealand	1st	50 km	4:45:46
2014	Lake Sonoma 50	USA	3rd	50 miles	6:12:58
2014	Transvulcania	Spain	3rd	73.3 km	7:11:39
2013	Mount Washington Road Race	USA	3rd	12.2 km	1:01:30
2014	Pikes Peak Ascent	USA	1st	>13.1 miles	2:10:03
2014	Speedgoat	USA	1st	50 km	5:12:30
2014	The Rut	USA	2nd	50 km	2:51:07
2014	The North Face 50-mile	USA	1st	50 miles	6:07:52
2015	Speedgoat	USA	1st	50 km	5:13:02
2016	Black Canyon 100K	USA	1st	100 km	7:52:26
2016	Transvulcania	Spain	3rd	73.3 km	7:14:16
2016	Moab Trail marathon	USA	2nd	26.2 miles	2:58:25
2017	Hong Kong 100K	China	3rd	100 km	10:03:50
2017	Chuckanut 50K	USA	3rd	50 km	3:40:28
2017	Lake Sonoma 50	USA	1st	50 miles	6:17:55
2017	XTERRA Trail Run World Championship	USA	2nd	13.2 miles	1:19:21
2018	Speedgoat	USA	2nd	50 km	5:29:22
2019	Moab Red Hot 55K	USA	2nd	55 km	3:52:41
2019	Pikes Peak Marathon	USA	2nd	26.2 miles	3:39:02
2019	XTERRA Trail Run World Championship	USA	2nd	13.2 miles	1:22:27
2024	Taco Bell 50k	USA	1st	50 km	4:28 (course record)

== Coaching ==
Canaday is self-coached and public with his training, posting most of his workouts on the activity-tracking website Strava.

He and his girlfriend, fellow ultramarathoner Sandi Nypaver, are the owners and founders of Higher Running, an online running coaching website which markets training plans and e-books for the running community.

Canaday is an outspoken opponent of performance-enhancing drug use and has professed support for a zero-tolerance policy for PED users in endurance sports.

== Personal life ==
Canaday was raised a vegetarian and describes his current diet as "nearly vegan," citing the environmental and health benefits of a plant-based, high-carbohydrate diet. He admits to regular beer-drinking and is sponsored by the Boulder-based Avery Brewing Company.

In 2021, Canaday suffered from a bi-lateral pulmonary embolism and lost his home and most possessions in a fire that destroyed an entire apartment complex in downtown Boulder, Colorado.

== Internet videos ==
Canaday is the owner of the YouTube channel Vo2maxProductions, where he posts a mix of training videos, running gear reviews, race recaps, and "training talks", all self-produced. He often releases several videos a week. As of July 2024, the channel has over 247,000 subscribers and more than 49,000,000 views.

Canaday was also the subject of a documentary film, "Starting Over," which highlighted his illness and return to running.
