= Le Catogne =

Mountain on the Blanc massif

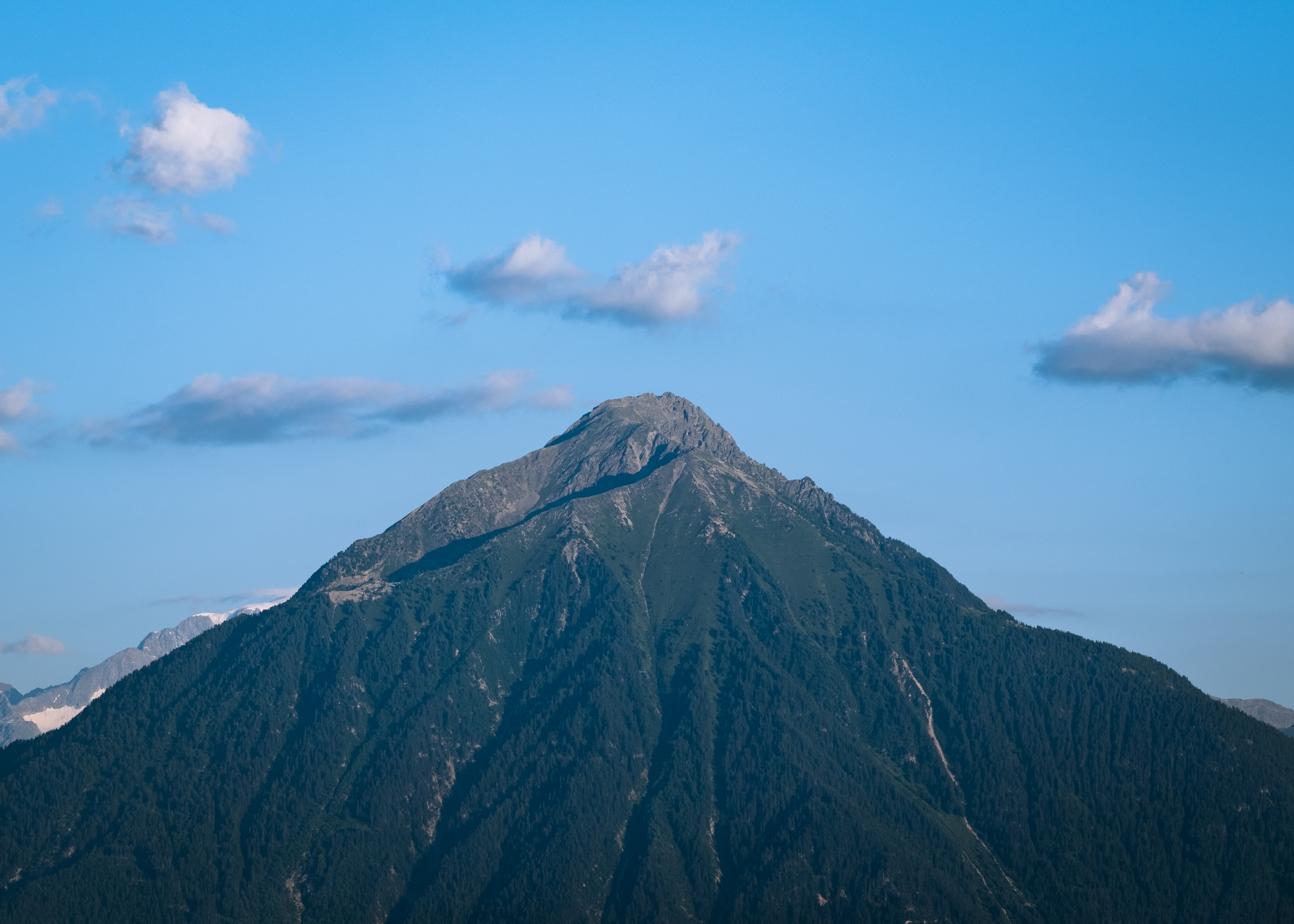

Highest point
- Elevation: 2,598 m (8,524 ft)
- Prominence: 1,108 m (3,635 ft)
- Parent peak: Mont Blanc
- Coordinates: 46°3′18.6″N 7°6′41.2″E

Geography
- Location within Switzerland
- Location: Valais, Switzerland
- Parent range: Mont Blanc massif

Le Catogne is a mountain on the extreme north-eastern edge of the Mont Blanc massif, overlooking Champex in the Swiss canton of Valais. Some sources consider this summit as being within the Pennine Alps.
