= Mount Washington Road Race =

Running race held in New Hampshire, USA

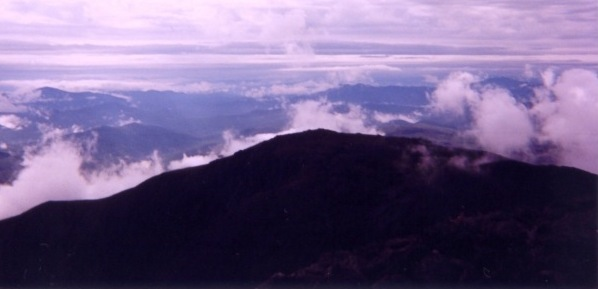
The Mt. Washington Road Race has an 11% grade, averaged over 7.6 miles.

The Mount Washington Road Race is a 7.6-mile (12.2 km) road running event that follows the auto road going from the base of Mount Washington in New Hampshire nearly to the mountain's summit (located at 6,288 feet (1,917 m) above sea level). The race was first held in 1936, and has been run annually since 1966. Women first participated officially in 1972.

The race course rises 4,650 vertical feet (1,420 m) feet from start to finish. It is a steep mountain course with an average grade of 12%, all uphill after the first few hundred yards. Held in June each year, Mount Washington is a popular race for runners in New England, and also attracts many runners from other parts of the United States and the world.

For non-elite runners, entry is by lottery. The lottery winners are able to be among the approximately 1,100 runners who partake in this annual event. The lottery is held in mid-March, with a sign-up period from March 1–15. Andy Schachat currently serves as race announcer.

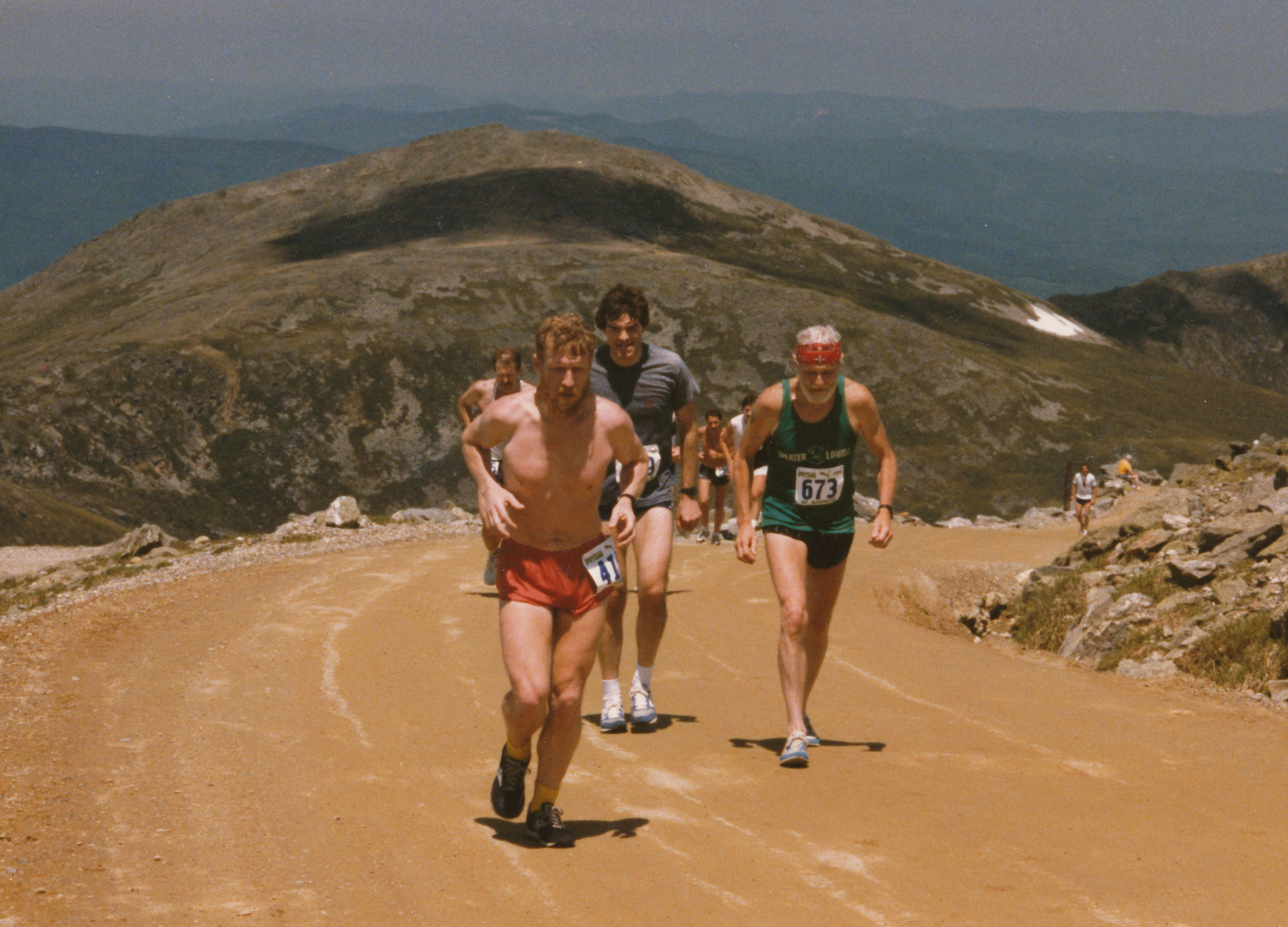
Competitors running on the upper portion of the auto road, well above tree line

The course record of 56:41 was set in 2004 by renowned mountain runner Jonathan Wyatt. The female course record was set by Shewarge Amarein of Ethiopia with a time of 1:08:21 in 2010. Multiple winners of the race on the men's side include Joseph Gray, Francis Darrah, Mike Gallagher, Bob Hodge, Gary Crossan, Dave Dunham, Derek Froude, Matt Carpenter, Daniel Kihara, Simon Gutierrez and Eric Blake. On the female side, Eleonora Mendonca, Cathy Hodgdon, Chris Maisto, Jacqueline Gareau, J'ne Day-Lucore, and Anna Pichrtová are multiple winners. John J. Kelley and Jacqueline Gareau are the only runners ever to win both the Boston Marathon and the Mount Washington Road Race. Kelley won the former in 1957 and the latter in 1961. Gareau won Boston in 1980 and won Mt. Washington in 1989, 1994 and 1996.

In addition to having a steep road race course, Mount Washington is home to extremely unpredictable weather. Winds have been known to top 200 miles per hour (320 km/h) at the summit. Although the race has never been run in such extreme conditions, factors like snow, ice, fog, wind, rain and cold, added to the steep climb, can make the race exceptionally challenging for those who run it. It is not uncommon for temperatures at the foot of the mountain to be warm at the beginning of the race, but for runners to encounter wintry white-out conditions at the summit, even in June. In an attempt to create some levity out of the difficult conditions, race organizers have often used the slogan "only one hill" as the event's official motto.

== Winners ==
Year	Men	Time	Women	Time
2025	Alexandre Richard (CA)	0:27:12	Rena Schwartz (USA)	0:32:30
2024	Joseph Gray -8-	1:02:21	Kayla Lampe (USA)	1:15:02
2023	Joseph Gray -7-	1:00:24	Amber Ferreira (USA)	1:15:15
2022	Joseph Gray -6-	0:27:43	Kim Dobson -7-	0:31:56
2021	Joseph Gray -5-	1:01:40	Kim Dobson -6-	1:11:16
2020	Event Cancelled (COVID 19)	N/A	Event Cancelled (COVID 19)	N/A
2019	Eric Blake -4-	1:02:52	(Tie) Brittni Hutton and Heidi Caldwell	1:16:17
2018	Cesare Maestri (ITA)	1:00:53	Kim Dobson -5-	1:11:43
2017	Joseph Gray -4-	58:58	Shannon Payne -2-	1:11:22
2016	Joseph Gray -3-	58:17	Kim Dobson -4-	1:09:34
2015	Joseph Gray -2-	58:15	Kim Dobson -3-	1:11:39
2014	Joseph Gray (USA)	59:09	Shannon Payne (USA)	1:10:12
2013	Eric Blake -3-	59:57	Laura Haefeli (USA)	1:18:05
2012	Sage Canaday (USA)	58:27	Kim Dobson -2-	1:09:25
2011	Rickey Gates -2-	1:01:32	Kim Dobson (USA)	1:12:11
2010	Chris Siemers (USA)	1:00:22	Shewarge Amare (ETH)	1:08:21
2009	Rickey Gates (USA)	59:58	Brandy Erholtz -2-	1:10:53
2008	Eric Blake -2-	1:00:39	Brandy Erholtz (USA)	1:11:08
2007	Jonathan Wyatt -2-	1:01:25	Anna Pichrtová -6-	1:12:53
2006	Eric Blake (USA)	1:01:09	Anna Pichrtová -5-	1:11:18
2005	Simon Gutierrez -3-	1:00:54	Melissa Moon (NZL)	1:10:11
2004	Jonathan Wyatt (NZL)	56:41	Anna Pichrtová -4-	1:12:19
2003	Simon Gutierrez -2-	1:02:54	Anna Pichrtová -3-	1:12:50
2002	Simon Gutierrez (USA)	28:02	Anna Pichrtová -2-	32:32
2001	Daniel Kihara -4-	1:00:06	Anna Pichrtová (CZE)	1:13:48
2000	Daniel Kihara -3-	59:24	Alice Muriithi (KEN)	1:17:26
1999	Daniel Kihara -2-	59:03	Barbara Remmers (USA)	1:13:52
1998	Matt Carpenter -3-	1:00:24	Magdalena Thorsell (SWE)	1:10:09
1997	Craig Fram (USA)	1:04:48	Cathy O'Brien (USA)	1:12:24
1996	Daniel Kihara (KEN)	58:21	Jacqueline Gareau -3-	1:17:15
1995	Gideon Mutisya (KEN)	1:01:42	J'ne Day-Lucore -3-	1:17:29
1994	Dave Dunham -3-	1:03:22	Jacqueline Gareau -2-	1:16:16
1993	Matt Carpenter -2-	59:49	J'ne Day-Lucore -2-	1:12:59
1992	Matt Carpenter (USA)	1:00:43	J'ne Day-Lucore (USA)	1:11:46
1991	Derek Froude -2-	1:00:35	Christine Maisto -3-	1:12:15
1990	Derek Froude (NZL)	59:17	Lynn Brown (USA)	1:19:57
1989	Dave Dunham -2-	1:02:59	Jacqueline Gareau (CAN)	1:13:13
1988	Dave Dunham (USA)	1:00:50	Janine Aiello (USA)	1:20:48
1987	Bob Hodge -7-	1:01:14	Peg Donovan (USA)	1:15:05
1986	Gary Crossan -4-	1:02:10	Christine Maisto -2-	1:19:26
1985	Bob Hodge -6-	1:01:31	Christine Maisto (USA)	1:14:44
1984	Gary Crossan -3-	1:01:13	Betsy Haydock (USA)	1:20:46
1983	Keith Woodward (USA)	1:06:38	Anna Sonnerup (USA)	1:22:19
1982	Gary Crossan -2-	1:01:40	Cathy Hodgdon -3-	1:22:40
1981	Gary Crossan (USA)	1:02:51	Cathy Hodgdon -2-	1:22:57
1980	Bob Hodge -5-	1:04:29	Cathy Hodgdon (USA)	1:26:44
1979	Bob Hodge -4-	1:02:08	Martha Rockwell (USA)	1:19:14
1978	Bob Hodge -3-	1:04:13	Eleonora Mendonça -3-	1:28:39
1977	Bob Hodge -2-	1:04:44	Eleonora Mendonça -2-	1:30:05
1976	Bob Hodge (USA)	1:05:31	Eleonora Mendonça (BRA)	1:35:05
1975	Gary Johnson (USA)	1:06:01	Hester Sargent (USA)	1:31:13
1974	Jim Capezzuto (USA)	1:07:58	---	---
1973	John Cederholm (USA)	1:08:26	Lise Demers (CAN)	1:51:51
1972	Roland Cormier (USA)	1:09:16	Charlotte Lettis (USA)	1:40:08
1971	Mike Gallagher -4-	1:07:27	---	---
1970	Mike Gallagher -3-	1:09:06	---	---
1969	Mike Gallagher -2-	1:06:44	---	---
1968	Mike Gallagher (USA)	1:06:13	---	---
1967	Angus Wooten (GBR)	1:12:43	---	---
1966	Leo J. Carroll (GBR)	1:07:31	---	---
1962	Fred Norris (GBR)	1:04:57	---	---
1961	John J. Kelley (USA)	1:08:54	---	---
1938	Francis Darrah -2-	1:15:27	---	---
1937	Paul Donato (USA)	1:16:24	---	---
1936	Francis Darrah (USA)	1:15:50	---	---

== See also ==
- Mount Washington Auto Road Bicycle Hillclimb
- Mount Washington Hillclimb Auto Race
