= Lac de Champex =

Lake in Valais, Switzerland

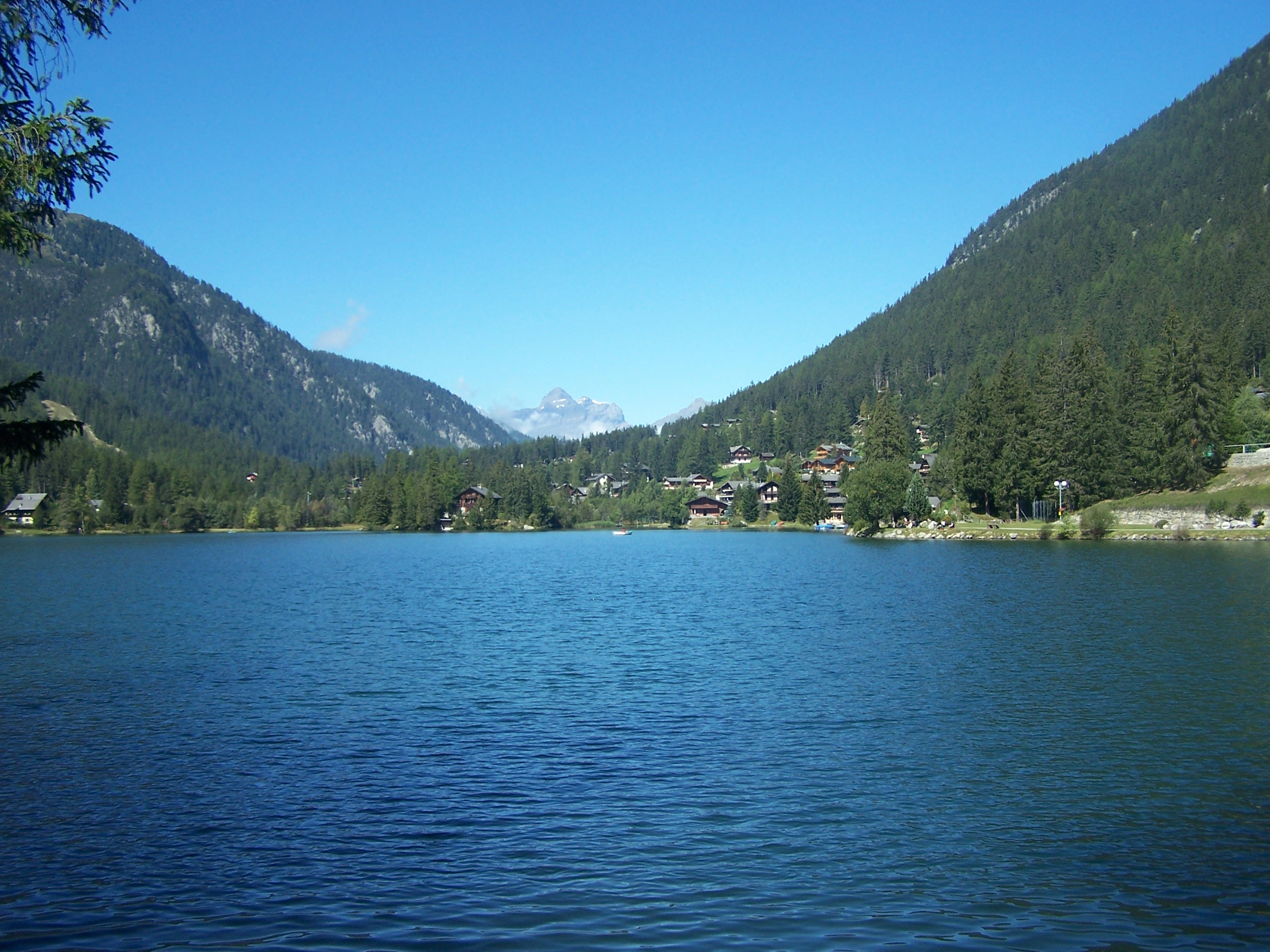

- Location within Canton of Valais Location within Switzerland Location within Alps
- Interactive map of Lac de Champex
- Location: Valais
- Coordinates: 46°1′42″N 7°6′59″E
- Basin countries: Switzerland
- Surface area: 11 ha (27 acres)
- Surface elevation: 1,466 m (4,810 ft)
- Settlements: Champex

Lac de Champex is a lake in Valais, Switzerland. Its surface area is 17 ha (42 acres). The village of Champex is situated on the shores.

== See also ==
- List of mountain lakes of Switzerland
