= Michelino Sunseri =

American ultrarunner

Personal information
- Nationality: American

Sport
- Country: United States
- Sport: Ultrarunning
- Event: Ultramarathon
- Club: Teton Valley Mountain Runners
- Turned pro: 2018

Michelino Sunseri is an ultrarunner from Kings Beach, California. Sunseri has been a professional ultramarathoner since 2018.

In September 2025, he was convicted, in federal court, of violating 36 CFR § 2.1(b) regarding shortcuts and hiking restrictions, during his 2024 record summit of Grand Teton at Grand Teton National Park; in November, he was pardoned by President Donald Trump.

== Notable race results ==
Year	Race	Location	Place	Ref.
2023	Broken Arrow Skyrace 46K	(United States) Lake Tahoe, California	1st	
2023	Run the Rut Lone Peak VK	(United States) Big Sky, Montana	2nd	
2023	Run the Rut 50K	(United States) Big Sky, Montana	1st	
2022	Lake Sonoma Marathon	(United States) Sonoma County, California	4th	
2022	Don't Fence Me In Trail Run 30K	(United States) Helena, Montana	1st	
2022	Speedgoat 50K	(United States) Snowbird, Utah	3rd	
2022	Pikes Peak Marathon	(United States) Manitou Springs, Colorado	4th	
2022	Mammoth Trailfest, Dragon Ascent	(United States) Mammoth Lakes, California	2nd	
2021	Run the Rut 50K	(United States) Big Sky, Montana	1st	
2020	Foresthill Divide Loop 30K	(United States) Foresthill, California	1st	
2020	Moab Trail Marathon	(United States) Moab, Utah	4th	
2019	Knickerbocker Canyon Trail Run 35K	(United States) Cool, California	1st	
2019	Silver State 50K	(United States) Reno, Nevada	1st	
2019	Mt. Ashland Hill Climb 13.3M	(United States) Ashland, Oregon	1st	
2019	Broken Arrow Skyrace 46K	(United States) Lake Tahoe, California	2nd	
2019	Speedgoat 50K	(United States) Snowbird, Utah	1st	
2018	Knickerbocker Canyon Trail Run 35K	(United States) Cool, California	1st	
2018	Broken Arrow Skyrace Vertical K	(United States) Lake Tahoe, California	2nd	
2018	Broken Arrow Skyrace 23K	(United States) Lake Tahoe, California	4th	
2018	Tahoe Flume Trail Fall Classic Half Marathon	(United States) Lake Tahoe, Nevada	1st	
2018	Transvulcania Ultramarathon La Palma Island Marathon	La Palma, Spain	5th	

== See also ==
- List of people granted executive clemency in the second Trump presidency
