= UTMB Index =

- Sport: Trail running / Ultramarathon
- Operator: UTMB Group
- Categories: 20K, 50K, 100K, 100M
- Related competitions: UTMB World Series, UTMB World Series Finals, Ultra-Trail du Mont-Blanc

The UTMB Index is a performance-rating system for trail running and ultramarathon runners, operated by UTMB Group as part of the UTMB World Series. It gives runners scores in the 20K, 50K, 100K and 100M race categories, as well as a general index based on results across categories.

The Index is used to compare performances across races with different distances, elevation profiles, terrain and competitive fields. It is also used within the UTMB World Series for athlete ranking, race eligibility, start-wave placement and elite access.

Running-media outlets and coaching sites have described the Index as one of the main ranking and qualification measures in contemporary trail running.

== Purpose ==
The UTMB Index was created to provide a common performance scale for trail running, a sport in which race courses vary widely in length, ascent, terrain, altitude, weather and technical difficulty. The system allows runners, race organizers, media, sponsors and fans to compare results across different events and race categories.

The wider UTMB system grew from the expansion of Ultra-Trail du Mont-Blanc from a single mountain race in Chamonix into a global trail-running brand. Doug Mayer's 2023 book The Race That Changed Running: The Inside Story of the UTMB describes the rise of UTMB from its early years around Mont Blanc into a central institution in international trail running.

In a 2026 Singletrack podcast episode about changes to the Index, UTMB representatives Adrien Vincent and Karen Merlin described the system as increasingly important for race entry, professional athlete benefits, media coverage and comparison between runners across different race formats.

== Race scores and Index ==
The UTMB system distinguishes between an individual race score and the overall UTMB Index. A race score measures a runner's performance in one race edition. The UTMB Index combines a runner's strongest recent race scores into a broader performance rating. Race scores are calculated for a specific race edition, while the Index is built from a weighted average of a runner's best scores over time. A race score remains attached to that race result, while the Index can change as a runner completes new races and older results lose weight in the calculation.

UTMB's race-score explanation describes the method as a way to convert race performance into a score that is comparable across race editions. Elite Trail Team has similarly explained that individual race scores and the broader Index serve different functions, with scores attached to performances and the Index summarizing a runner's recent level.

== Categories ==
The UTMB Index is organized into four categories:

Category	Race type	Example use
20K	Short trail and mountain races	Ranking and comparison over shorter trail distances
50K	Marathon to short ultramarathon races	Ranking and comparison for 50K-category events
100K	Middle-distance ultramarathons	Ranking and comparison for 100K-category events
100M	Long ultramarathons	Ranking and comparison for 100M-category events

These categories correspond to the main distance framework used by the UTMB World Series. GOREWEAR's guide to the UTMB World Series describes the same category structure and explains that runners receive Index scores tied to these distance categories. French training site Campus Coach has also described the Index as an official trail-performance measure calculated across the 20K, 50K, 100K and 100M categories.

== Calculation ==
UTMB describes the Index as a weighted average of a runner's best race scores over the previous three years, with stronger and recent scores carrying greater influence. UTMB's FAQ states that up to a runner's five best scores are taken into account once a runner has a valid result in the category. The score for an individual race is calculated from the performances achieved in that race edition. The updated system compares runners within the same race, using the movement of the field to account indirectly for race-day conditions such as heat, mud, technical terrain or weather.

The 2026 explanation described four broad stages in the scoring process: identifying relevant comparison races, estimating expected performance for runners, selecting high-confidence data from the race field and converting race speed into a final score. Trail & Kale summarized the 2026 update as the largest change to the Index since 2010 and highlighted new attention to gradient, altitude, race competitiveness and recalculation of previous scores.

== 2026 update ==
In April 2026, UTMB announced an evolution of the UTMB Index calculation, describing the Index as a tool used since 2010 to evaluate trail-running performances across large numbers of recorded results. The organization said the update was intended to improve consistency across distances and terrain types and create a stronger foundation for future scoring.

The revised method addressed several common questions about the Index, including race-day conditions, gender scoring, professional-athlete benefits and perceived bias toward UTMB-branded races. Trail & Kale reported that the 2026 revision included a transparency campaign around how the calculation works, while Elite Trail Team described the change as part of a wider evolution in how UTMB scores are applied to athletes and race results.

== Gender scoring and athlete policies ==
The UTMB Index uses a single absolute scoring scale. UTMB has compared the Index to a stopwatch or tape measure: one unit of measurement applied across the field. The organization has also discussed separate gender-based indices and sought feedback from elite women athletes before continuing with a single scale. UTMB has introduced athlete parenthood policies connected to the Index. In 2026, UTMB World Series announced an expansion of its Paths to Parenthood policy, stating that elite runners' UTMB Index and ranking could be frozen for up to five years during their path to parenthood.

== Relationship to ITRA ==
The UTMB Index has historical links to earlier trail-running performance index systems. The International Trail Running Association (ITRA) was established in 2013 and developed its own Performance Index for comparing trail runners worldwide.

The UTMB Index and ITRA Performance Index shared earlier database history before the two systems separated, with UTMB continuing its own index under the UTMB name. RunMotion has described the distinction between the UTMB Index and the ITRA Performance Index, explaining that both are trail-running performance systems with separate institutional operators and uses.

== Reception ==
The UTMB Index has become influential as trail running has grown and professionalized. Singletrack described it as significant for sponsorship, race entry opportunities, fan understanding and media comparison across years, distances and terrain types. UTMB's 2026 update was presented partly as a response to the growing importance of the Index for elite athletes and the broader trail-running ecosystem.

Common questions have concerned the transparency of the calculation, comparison between men and women, perceived bias toward UTMB-branded races, treatment of weather and course conditions, and the relationship between race-day scores and course records. UTMB representatives said the calculation gives no scoring bonus to UTMB-branded events and handles race-day conditions through comparison among runners in the same race edition.

Several running outlets have published explanatory guides because the Index is frequently confused with ITRA points and other trail-running qualification systems. Finishers described the UTMB Index as a runner-performance measure, while ITRA points concern race difficulty; RunMotion and Campus Coach also published French and English explanations of the distinction between UTMB and ITRA systems.

== See also ==
- UTMB World Series
- UTMB World Series Finals
- Ultra-Trail du Mont-Blanc
- International Trail Running Association
- Trail running
- Ultramarathon
