= Broken Arrow Skyrace =

100 mile ultramarathon

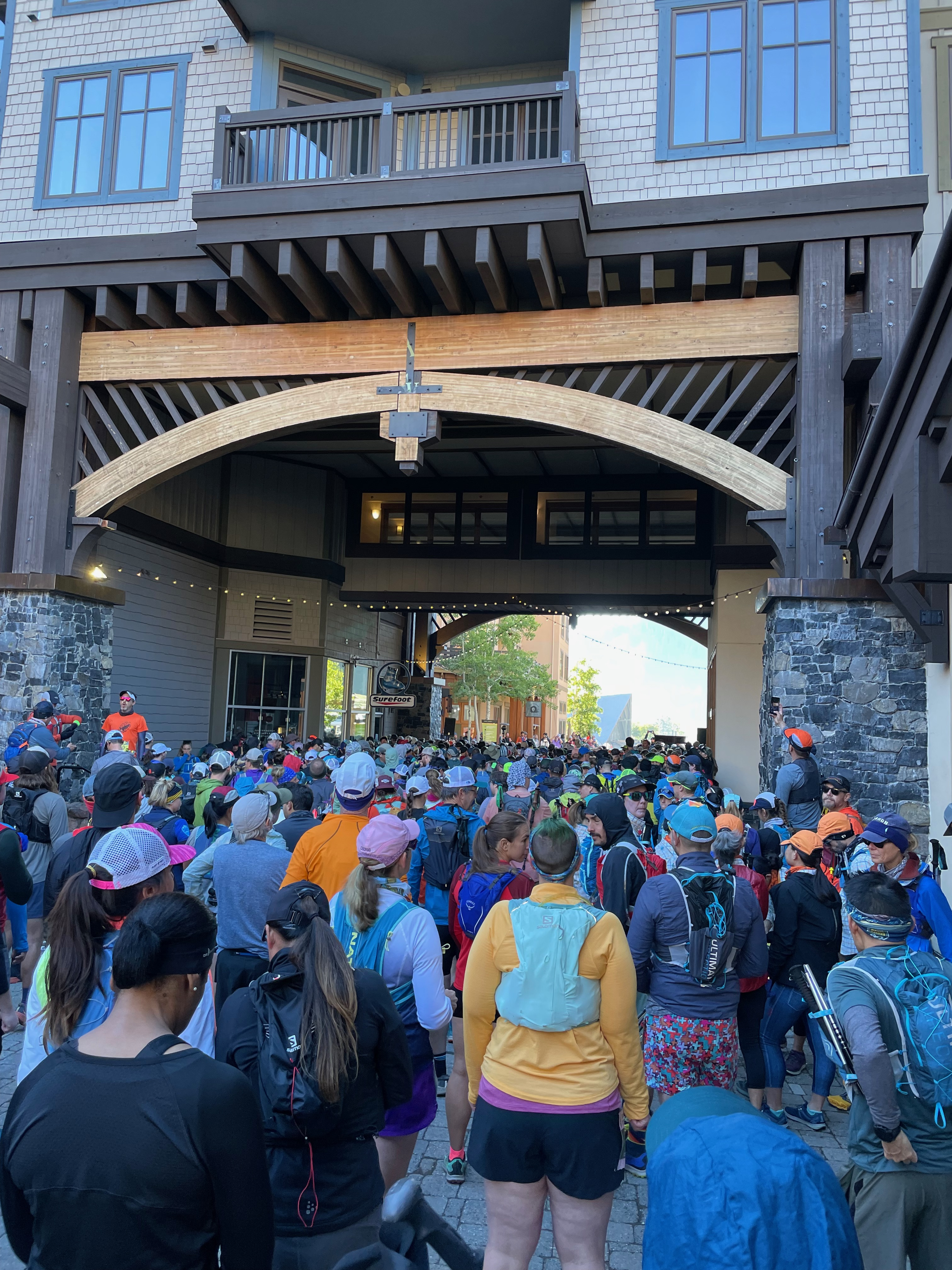
- The start of 2022 race.
- Location: (United States) Truckee, California
- Event type: Ultramarathon
- Distance: 46K, 23K, 18K, 11K, VK
- Primary sponsor: Nike ACG (All Conditions Gear)
- Website: Broken Arrow Skyrace

Broken Arrow Skyrace is an annual three-day, eight distance sky running race series held at Palisades Tahoe in the North Lake Tahoe region of California.

The Broken Arrow Skyrace features eight events spread over three days: the Vertical Kilometer (VK), "Iron Face Challenge" which includes a section of via ferrata climbing, 11 kilometres (6.8 mi), 18 kilometres (11 mi), 23 kilometres (14 mi), 46 kilometres (29 mi), Triple Crown (VK+23k+46k), Iron Crown (Iron Face+23k+46k), and a kids race.

Broken Arrow races are unique in California as most of the terrain is above tree line, with significant parts of the course still snowbound in some high precipitation years. The race begins at the same location and on part of the same course as the Western States Endurance Run. Founded in 2016, the race has grown to host thousands of participants including many international runners and an elite field. In 2024, the VK and 23k were the host race for the Mountain Running World Cup.

In December 2025, the race announced a new multi-year title sponsorship with Nike ACG (All Conditions Gear) beginning with the 2026 event. The total of $150,000 in prize money, spread across three races, was announced as the largest prize purse of any trail race in the world.

== Results ==
=== 2025 ===
46K - Men
Place	Name
1	(United States) Eli Hemming
2	(United States) David Sinclair
3	(United States) Ryan Becker
4	(United States) Noah Williams
5	(United States) Jeshurun Small

46K - Women
Place	Name
1	(United States) Jennifer Lichter
2	(United States) Helen Mino Faukner
3	(United States) Daniella Moreno
4	(United States) Jane Maus
5	(United States) Grayson Murphy

23K - Men
Place	Name
1	(Switzerland) Elhousine Elazzaoui
2	(Kenya) Philemon Ombogo Kiriago
3	(Kenya) Patrick Kipngeno
4	(United States) Christian Allen
5	(Germany) Lukas Ehrle

23K - Women
Place	Name
1	(Kenya) Joyce Muthoni Njeru
2	(Romania) Florea Monica Madalina
3	(United States) Anna Gibson
4	(United States) Lauren Gregory
5	(Italy) Alice Gaggi

18K - Men
Place	Name
1	(United States) Daniel Friesen
2	(United States) Teddy Eyster
3	(United States) Etienne Blrdes
4	(United States) Elius Graff
5	(United States) Joshua Bigler

18K - Women
Place	Name
1	(United States) Kristina Randrup
2	(Australia) Sidney McIntosh
3	(United States) Lisa Musacchio
4	(United States) Lucinda Kolpa
5	(United States) Emily Schwerdt

=== 2024 ===
46K - Men
Place	Name
1	(United States) David Sinclair
2	(United States) Jeff Mogavero
3	(United States) Adam Peterman
4	(United States) Cameron Smith
5	(China) Guangfu Meng

46K - Women
Place	Name
1	(South Africa) Toni McCann
2	(United States) Klaire Rhodes
3	(United States) Amanda Basham
4	(United States) Lindsay Allison
5	(United States) Sarah Guhl

23K - Men
Place	Name
1	(Kenya) Patrick Kipngeno
2	(United States) Eli Hemming
3	(Kenya) Philemon Ombogo Kiriago
4	(United States) Taylor Stack
5	(United States) Meikael Beaudoin-Rousseau

23K - Women
Place	Name
1	(Kenya) Joyce Muthoni Njeru
2	(United States) Jade Belzberg
3	(United States) Tabor Hemming
4	(United States) Allie McLaughlin
5	(United States) Daniella Moreno

18K - Men
Place	Name
1	(United States) Kyle Lund
2	(United States) Daniel Sealand
3	(United States) Richard Skogsberg
4	(United States) Joshua Bigler
5	(United States) Brody Barkan

18K - Women
Place	Name
1	(United States) Anika Kimme
2	(Australia) Paige Penrose
3	(United States) Summer Allen
4	(United States) Lyndsey Bednar
5	(United States) Care Bear

=== 2023 ===
46K - Men
Place	Name
1	(United States) Michelino Sunseri
2	(United States) Jeff Mogavero
3	(United States) Nick Handel
4	(United States) Cole Campbell
5	(United States) Grant Barnette

46K - Women
Place	Name
1	(United States) Helen Mino Faukner
2	(United States) Lindsey McDonald
3	(United States) Kristina Mascarenas
4	(China) Fuzhao Xiang
5	(United States) Emmiliese Von Avis

23K - Men
Place	Name
1	(United States) Eli Hemming
2	(United States) Chad Hall
3	(United States) Meikael Beaudoin-Rousseau
4	(United States) Talon Hull
5	(Italy) Henri Aymonod

23K - Women
Place	Name
1	(United States) Allie McLaughlin
2	(United States) Anna Gibson
3	(United States) Tabor Hemming
4	(United States) Janelle Lincks
5	(United Kingdom) Sara Willhoit
