= JFK 50 Mile =

Ultramarathon in Washington County, Maryland, USA

Coordinates: 39°30′44.5″N 77°39′14″W

- Date: 23 November 2024
- Location: Boonsboro, Maryland to Williamsport, Maryland
- Event type: Ultramarathon
- Distance: 50 miles (80 km)
- Established: 1963 (63 years ago)
- Course records: Men's: 5:08:27 (2024); David Sinclair; Women's: 5:57:32 (2024); Rachel Drake
- Website: JFK 50 Mile

The JFK 50 Mile or the JFK 50 Mile Memorial is an ultramarathon that takes place annually in Washington County, Maryland, United States. The first race was held on 30 March 1963, one of numerous 50-mile (80 km) races that year. After the Kennedy assassination, many of these events were never held again. It is the oldest continuously held ultramarathon in the US.

The current course records are held by David Sinclair (5:08:27) for men and Rachel Drake (5:57:32) for women, both set in 2024. Rachel Drake is the only woman to have run the race in under 6 hours.

The race starts in the town of Boonsboro, Maryland; the official starting line is marked by two commemorative bronze plaques, one on each side of Boonsboro's main street. It then heads east out of town toward the South Mountain Inn. The first 2.3 miles (3.7 km) are on a hardball road, which leads to the Appalachian Trail. The Appalachian Trail piece is approximately 13 miles (21 km). The trail then continues on the Chesapeake and Ohio Canal for 26.3 miles (42.3 km), following the canal to Dam #4 on the Potomac River. The final leg of the Race follows 8.4 miles (13.5 km) of hardball roads to Williamsport, Maryland. As of 2023, the race has a 13-hour time limit, runners that do not finish in 13 hours are required to withdraw from the race.

The Race is held on the Saturday before Thanksgiving.

The current race director is Mike Spinnler.

== History ==
The JFK 50 was founded in 1963 by William Joseph “Buzz” Sawyer Jr. (1928-2019). It was initially a private club event of the boys of the Cumberland Valley Athletic Club based in Hagerstown, Maryland. With all the 50-mile hikes taking place across the country in 1963, Sawyer decided to organize his own hike for the Club. The 50-miler took place on March 30, 1963, and was called the “CVAC 50 Mile Hike.” The original route started at Boonsboro Junior High School and ended at St. James School in Hagerstown. Ten boys and Sawyer started. Only three boys finished, all age 16, together with Sawyer in 13:10.
