= Speedgoat =

Running competition

- Location: (United States) Little Cottonwood Canyon
- Event type: Trailrunning, Skyrunning, Ultramarathon
- Distance: 50 km; 30 km; 10 km; 5 km
- Primary sponsor: Hoka One One; Wahoo Fitness
- Established: 2008
- Website: Speedgoat Mountain Races

Speedgoat Mountain Races is an international skyrunning competition founded by Karl Meltzer. It is run every year in Little Cottonwood Canyon (Utah, United States) in July and includes a marquee 50 kilometer race, as well as a 28 km race added in 2018 and a 10km race added in 2023. In 2025, the 28 km was changed to 30 km. In 2026, a 5 km race was added known as the Speedgoat Summit.

The 50k race features an elevation ascent and descent of roughly 11,000 feet. The race has a minimum base elevation 7,589 feet and a maximum elevation of 10,980 feet. Due to its high altitude, large vertical gain/loss, and technical terrain, the race is regarded as one of the toughest 50ks in the world.

In 2012, 2013 and 2014 the 50K was valid as Sky Ultra for the Skyrunner World Series.

Prior to the 2021 edition, Meltzer sold the Speedgoat races to IRONMAN Group, which is owned by Advance Publications. A stipulation of the sale was that Meltzer remain as race director through the 2024 edition. Beginning in 2023, the races are part of the UTMB World Series.

== Races results ==
- Speedgoat 50K - 50 km / 3,450 M+ (31 miles / 11,318 ft+)
- Speedgoat 30K - 31 km / 2,000 M+ (19.2 miles / 6,561 ft+)
- Speedgoat 10K - 10 km / 500 M+ (6.2 miles / 1,640 ft+)
- Speedgoat Summit - 5 km / 921 M+ (3.1 miles / 3,021 ft+)

=== 50K Winners ===
Race of Skyrunner World Series
Race of UTMB World Series

Edition	Year	Men's winner	Women's winner
1st	2008	(United States) Nate McDowell	(United States) Anita Ortiz
2nd	2009	(United States) Erik Storheim	(United States) Mandy Hosford
3rd	2010	(United States) Kevin Shilling	(United States) Keri Nelson
4th	2011	(United States) Nick Clark	(United States) Bethany Lewis
5th	2012	(Spain) Kilian Jornet	(New Zealand) Anna Frost
6th	2013	(United States) Sage Canaday	(United States) Stephanie Howe
7th	2014	(United States) Sage Canaday	(New Zealand) Anna Frost
8th	2015	(United States) Sage Canaday	(United States) Hillary Allen
9th	2016	(United States) Hayden Hawks	(United States) Abby Rideout
10th	2017	(United States) Jim Walmsley	(United States) Anna Mae Flynn
11th	2018	(United States) David Sinclair	(New Zealand) Ruth Croft
12th	2019	(United States) Michelino Sunseri	(United States) Anna Mae Flynn
13th	2020	(United States) Noah Brautigam	(United States) Michelle Hummel
14th	2021	(United States) Adam Peterman	(United States) Ashley Brasovan
15th	2022	(United States) David Sinclair	(United States) Addie Bracy
16th	2023	(United States) Christian Allen	(United States) Helen Mino Faukner
17th	2024	(United States) David Sinclair	(Canada) Jazmine Lowther
18th	2025	(United States) Ryan Becker	(United States) Jennifer Lichter
19th	2026	(United States) Mason Coppi	(United States) Lauren Gregory

=== 28K Winners ===
Edition	Year	Men's winner	Women's winner
1st	2018	(United States) Timmy Parr	(United States) Marissa Floodman
2nd	2019	(United States) Davin Grapentine	(United States) Mali Noyes
3rd	2020	(United States) Jeshurun Small	(United States) Jessica Brazeau
4th	2021	(United States) Justin Grunwald	(United States) Sophia Gorman
5th	2022	(United States) Zane Fields	(United States) Tabor Hemming
6th	2023	(United States) Andy Wacker	(United States) Hannah Rowe
7th	2024	(United States) Hawk Call	(United States) Robyn Lesh
8th	2025	(United States) Christian Allen	(United States) Kody Kleven
9th	2026	(United States) Adrian MacDonald	(United States) Carmen Bango

=== 10K Winners ===
Edition	Year	Men's winner	Women's winner
1st	2023	(United States) Timmy Parr	(Canada) Karley Rempel
2nd	2024	(United States) Taylor Bondin	(United States) Josie Alexander
3rd	2025	(United States) Shawn Little	(United States) Janelle Day
4th	2026	(United States) Noah Knight	(United States) Maili Boyer

=== Summit Winners ===
Edition	Year	Men's winner	Women's winner
1st	2026	(Italy) Davide Giardini	(United States) Amber Zimmerman
