= Tarawera Ultramarathon =

Race in New Zealand

Tarawera Ultra-Trail
- Date: February
- Location: Rotorua, Bay of Plenty, New Zealand
- Event type: Trail running, Ultramarathon
- Distance: TMiler (163 km / 101.2 miles); T102 (102 km / 63.3 miles); T50 (52 km / 32.3 miles); T21 (23 km / 14.2 miles); T14 (14 km / 8.6 miles)
- Established: 2009
- Organizer: UTMB World Series

Tarawera Ultra-Trail is a trail running event series hosted annually in Bay of Plenty. It is held annually in February and takes place in Rotorua, New Zealand. The event includes a 14 km, 21 km, 50 km, 102 km and a 100 mile ultramarathon trail race.

== Event history ==
The race was created by Rotorua local Paul Charteris in 2009. The inaugural race was over an 85 km distance and was won by New Zealanders, Kerry Suter and Jean Beaumont. Kerry backed up his 2009 win with a further win in 2010, this time over the new distance of 100 km.

The race was previously a in the Ultra-Trail World Tour. It has featured different distances throughout the years. In 2014, the 50 km race was added. The 2016 and 2017 races featured a trail marathon distance. In 2017, the 100 km race was extended by 2 km to a complete distance of 102 km. In 2018, the inaugural 100 mile race was added to the event.

The 2022 race was cancelled due to the COVID-19 pandemic.

The 2023 edition saw another round of major changes come to the race, with announcements of a new 21 km race and the race joining the UTMB World Series. The 2027 edition will feature a 14 km race.

== Course records ==
The 102 km course ran from Rotorua to Kawerau from 2009 to 2017. The old course records were set in 2017 by Americans Camille Herron (8:56:00) and Jim Walmsley (7:23:32). The course changed direction in 2018, starting in Kawerau in and finishing in Rotorua. In 2018, 100 miles was added to the events. The courses have had deviations over the years due to inclement weather. The records for the current course are held by New Zealanders Ruth Croft and Daniel Jones, both set in 2025.

== Results and past winners ==
=== 102 km Winners ===
Year	Women's Winner	Time	Men's Winner	Time	Notes
2009	Jean Beaumont (NZL)	10:14:15	Kerry Suter (NZL)	8:12:00	85 km course
2010	Fleur Bromley (NZL)	11:29:12	Kerry Suter (NZL)	9:48:20	Course updated to 100 km
2011	Amy Campbell (NZL)	11:36:35	Sam Wreford (NZL)	8:33:50	
2012	Nicola Gildersleeve (CAN)	10:26:28	Mick Donges (AUS)	8:51:08	
2013	Ruby Muir (NZL)	10:30:11	Sage Canaday (USA)	8:53:34	
2014	Jo Johansen (NZL)	9:02:23	Sage Canaday (USA)	8:27:06	Shortened course due to weather (approx. 73 km)
2015	Ruby Muir (NZL)	9:02:42	Dylan Bowman (USA)	7:44:57	
2016	Fiona Hayvice (NZL)	10:34:26	Jonas Buud (SWE)	8:00:53	
2017	Camille Herron (USA)	8:56:00	Jim Walmsley (USA)	7:23:32	Distance officially changed to 102 km; Rotorua to Kawerau course record
2018	Kelly Wolf (USA)	10:08:45	Dylan Bowman (USA)	8:27:41	Course direction reversed (Kawerau to Rotorua)
2019	Courtney Dauwalter (USA)	9:28:04	Reece Edwards (AUS)	8:22:52	
2020	Manuela Soccol (BEL)	9:39:49	Tom Evans (ENG)	8:03:29	
2021	Ruth Croft (NZL)	9:21:03	Rhys Johnston (NZL)	9:39:29	
2022	Event cancelled due to COVID-19 restrictions				
2023	Nancy Jiang (NZL)	9:26:08	Daniel Jones (NZL)	7:27:55	Joined UTMB World Series
2024	Ruth Croft (NZL)	9:14:14	Daniel Jones (NZL)	7:46:42	
2025	Ruth Croft (NZL)	8:24:34	Daniel Jones (NZL)	7:17:42	Course records set for current route
2026	Ruth Croft (NZL)	8:41:11	Daniel Jones (NZL)	7:31:27	

=== 100 Mile Winners ===
Year	Women's Winner	Time	Men's Winner	Time	Notes
2018	Sally McRae (USA)	21:11:14	Adrian Prigent (FRA)	19:38:32	Inaugural 100-mile race
2019	Camille Herron (USA)	17:25:45	Jeff Browning (USA)	16:18:54	
2020	Ailsa Campbell (NZL)	20:30:15	Vladimir Shatrov (AUS)	15:53:30	
2021	Katie Wright (NZL)	20:18:19	Matt Urbanski (USA)	18:04:34	
2022	Event cancelled due to COVID-19 restrictions				
2023	Katie Wright (NZL)	18:20:21	Zach Miller (USA)	14:41:41	
2024	Konoka Azumi (JPN)	18:25:32	Adrian Macdonald (USA)	15:01:31	
2025	Kimino Miyazaki (JPN)	17:40:37	Sam Harvey (NZL)	15:16:54	
2026	Devon Yanko (USA)	19:58:28	Simon Cochrane (NZL)	16:26:17	
