= Virginia Headwaters Council =

Council of the Boy Scouts of America

Virginia Headwaters Council (#763)
- Owner: Boy Scouts of America
- Headquarters: Waynesboro, Virginia
- Location: Virginia, West Virginia
- Country: United States
- Founded: 1927
- Council President: Mike White
- Council Commissioner: Matt Phillippi
- Scout Executive: Susan Hart
- Website www.virginiaheadwaters.org

The Virginia Headwaters Council (VAHC) is the local council of the Boy Scouts of America (BSA) that serves Scouts in areas of the Shenandoah Valley in Virginia and West Virginia and areas of central Virginia.

== History ==
The first council in the area was the Staunton Council, formed in 1920 and failed in 1924. The Stonewall Jackson Area Council was chartered in Staunton, Virginia in January 1927. The adjacent Lewis & Clark Council was formed in Charlottesville, Virginia in February 1927, and it dissolved and was absorbed into the Stonewall Jackson Council in mid-1931. The first Scout executive of the Stonewall Jackson Area Council was J.W. Fix who served from 1927 to 1950.

The council was renamed in 2019 to the Virginia Headwaters Council. The name refers to the area being the source of the James River, York River, Rappahannock River, and the Potomac River.

== Organization ==
The council is part of Council Service Territory 12 of the BSA. The council service center is in Staunton, Virginia and employs four paid professional Scouters and office staff. VAHC is divided into two districts:

- Monticello District: Charlottesville; Albemarle, Fluvanna, Greene, Louisa, Madison and Orange counties
- Mountain Valley District: Staunton, Waynesboro, Augusta, Harrisonburg, Rockingham, Pendleton, Buena Vista, Covington, Clifton Forge, Lexington, Alleghany, Bath, Rockbridge, and Highland counties

== Camp Shenandoah ==
Camp Shenandoah
- Location: Swoope, Virginia
- Coordinates: 38°08′03″N 79°13′39″W
- Founded: 1950
- Founder: J. W. Fix
- Camp Director: Robert Clemmer
- Assistant Camp Director: Jim Echols
- Program Director: Zac Collins
- Camp Commissioner: RJ Sen
- Website www.campshenandoah.org

Camp Shenandoah was first established in 1930 near McGaheysville, Virginia and moved to its present site near Swoope, Virginia in 1950. With expansions in 1999, the camp property is now 454 acres (1.84 km^{2}) located on the eastern slope of Little North Mountain. The west side of the camp borders on the George Washington National Forest and north, east and south sides bordering on agricultural areas of Swoope. A hunter access road runs through the camp. Three creeks run through the camp, supplying the small man-made Hope Lake. A portion of the new property on the north side has been placed into the Conservation Reserve Enhancement Program and is being restored from an agricultural to a natural state. The camp suffered major damage during the June 2012 North American derecho, resulting in the temporary closure of the camp. Due to the fortunate circumstance of the entirety of the camp's staffers and attendees already being gathered in the dining hall, no one was injured.

The camp is primarily used by units within the council, but is available to other Scouting units and youth groups and is used year-round.

Camp Shenandoah is recognized as a nationally accredited summer camp by BSA National Camp Accreditation Program.

=== Facilities ===
The camp ranger has a house just outside the camp entrance. The camp office includes the health lodge where emergency health care is provided during summer camp. The dining hall seats up to 300 people and includes the kitchen and food storage facilities, a staff lounge and restrooms for visitors. The trading post is a camp store that sells snacks, souvenirs, craft materials, and other items during summer camp; attached is a storage room. The maintenance area includes the workshop, quartermaster storage, a shed for tractor and equipment storage, and equipment for the welding merit badge. The parade field provides an area where campers assemble for flag ceremonies and other activities. The Lockridge Chapel is open-air with benches for seating. The shower house has facilities for male and female, youth and adult campers. Water is provided from a well-fed water tower and sewage is processed on-site. There is a campfire ring by the lake that provides uncovered seating for the Sunday and Friday night campfires. There is also a campfire ring solely used for Order of the Arrow activities and ceremonies.

The camp has 14 tent campsites, each with running water and a latrine and most with a small pavilion. Unimproved areas are available for outpost camping. The 14th campsite, Ridgway, is considered "primitive" and guests must bring their own tents.

The Colonel Morris T. Warner Jr. Rifle Range, the shotgun range and the archery range are located on OA Ridge; a separate black powder range can be set up as needed. The climbing area has a climbing tower that is no longer in use. The waterfront has a swim area, canoes, and rowboats.

=== Summer Camp ===
The summer camp program provides opportunities for a range of merit badges in the areas of Scoutcraft, Handicraft, aquatics, nature, STEM, Timber Mountain, Trail-to-Eagle, and Shooting Sports. Other programs include hikes to Elliott Knob and a high adventure program. Scout leaders can take supplemental training in aquatics and boating safety and CPR. New Scouts can participate in Timber Mountain, which is designed to help work towards First Class Scout.

=== 2009 fire ===
In the early morning of August 7, 2009, a fire destroyed the wooden trading post, killing one adult. Since then, a new metal trading post has been built and no staff sleep in the building.

== Shenandoah Lodge ==
Shenandoah Lodge
- Founded: 29 March 1944
- Lodge Chief: Charles Palmer V
- Lodge Adviser: Jeff Nelson
- Staff Adviser: Robert Clemmer
- Website shenandoahlodge.org

The Order of the Arrow is represented by the Shenandoah Lodge. It supports the Scouting programs of the Virginia Headwaters Council through leadership, camping, and service. Currently, the lodge has four chapters serving the council's districts.

== See also ==
- Scouting in Virginia
