= Champex =

Village in the canton of Valais, Switzerland

Coordinates: 46°02′N 7°07′E

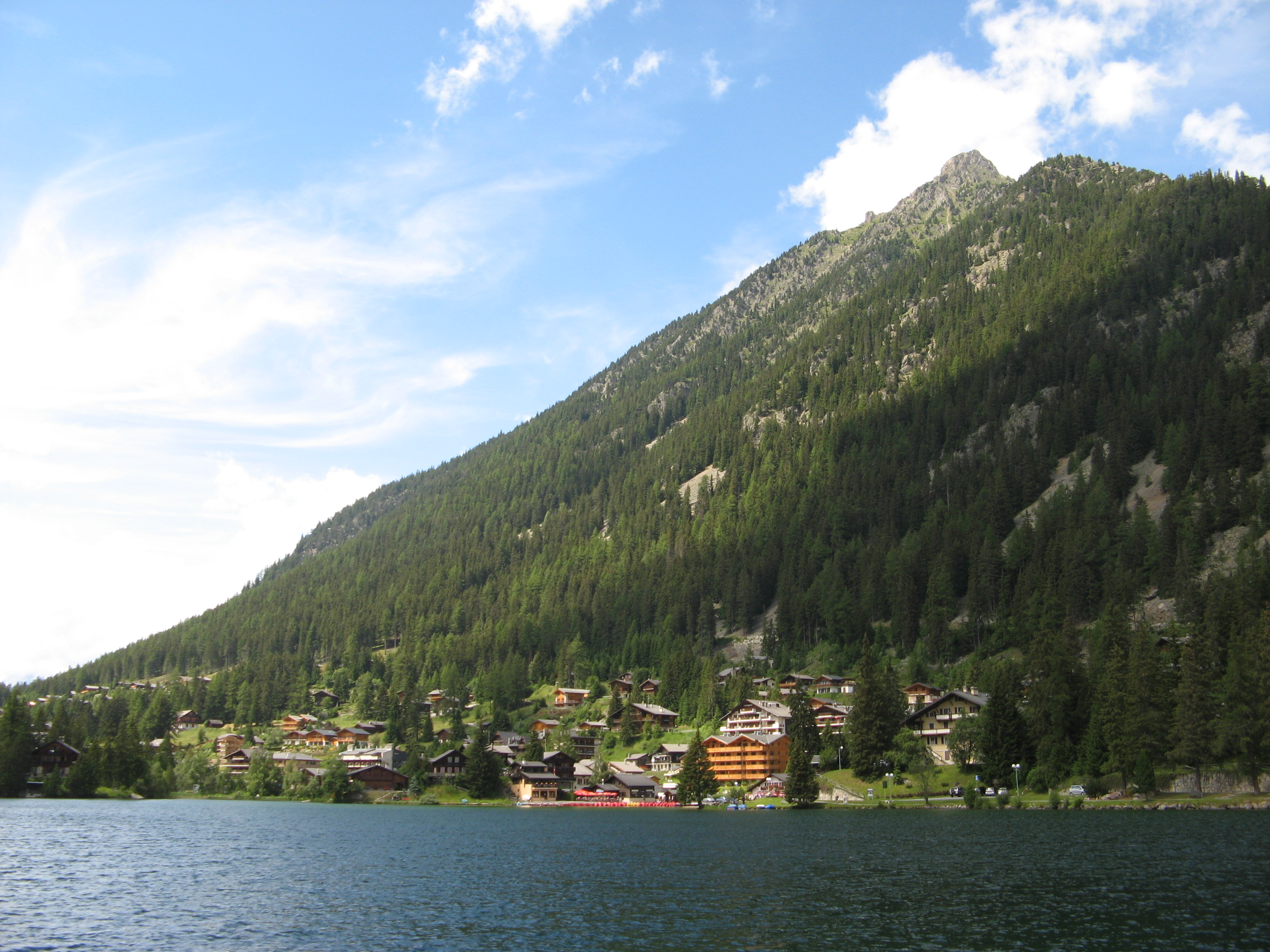
Champex

Champex (French pronunciation: [ʃɑ̃pe]; also Champex-Lac) is a village located in the French-speaking Swiss canton of Valais, part of the municipality of Orsières.

The village lies at 1,470 metres on the shore of Lac de Champex, at the foot of the Mont Blanc Massif. It is a starting point for many hikes into the surrounding mountains and huts (La Breya, Cabane du Trient, Le Catogne). Champex is also a small ski resort.

The Champex Pass is located a few hundred metres west of Champex.
