= UTMB World Series =

Global ultramarathon trail running race series

- Sport: Trail running / Ultramarathon
- Founded: 2021
- First season: 2022
- Organizing body: UTMB Group
- Region: Worldwide
- Qualification: UTMB Index and Running Stones
- Level on pyramid: Finals, Majors, Events, Index races
- Website: utmb.world

The UTMB World Series is a global circuit of trail running and ultramarathon events operated by UTMB Group, a privately held company, in a commercial partnership with The IRONMAN Group.

It began in 2022 and uses the name of the original Ultra-Trail du Mont-Blanc race as the umbrella brand for a worldwide race system.

The World Series is distinct from the annual UTMB World Series Finals race week in Chamonix.

== Overview ==
The UTMB World Series is organized around a global calendar of trail-running events that lead toward the annual UTMB World Series Finals at UTMB Mont-Blanc in Chamonix, France.

The series uses two main systems: the UTMB Index, which measures a runner's performance level, and Running Stones, which give runners entries in the lottery for the Chamonix Finals.

The UTMB Index is a performance-rating system for trail runners. It gives runners scores in the 20K, 50K, 100K and 100M categories and can be used for ranking, comparison and entry eligibility across races of different distances, terrain profiles and competitive fields.

Running Stones are separate from the UTMB Index. They are lottery entries for the UTMB World Series Finals. A runner generally needs both a valid UTMB Index in the relevant category and at least one Running Stone to enter the lottery for OCC, CCC or UTMB at UTMB Mont-Blanc.

The series has four levels: Finals, Majors, Events and Index races. Finals are held at UTMB Mont-Blanc. Majors are regional championship-level races. Events are UTMB-branded races held across several continents. Index races allow runners to obtain or update a UTMB Index, while Running Stones are awarded through World Series Events and Majors.

== UTMB Index ==
The UTMB Index is the performance-rating system used in the UTMB World Series. It gives trail runners a score in the 20K, 50K, 100K and 100M categories, as well as a general index based on results across categories. The Index is used to compare performances across races with different distances, elevation profiles, terrain and competitive fields.

A valid UTMB Index is required to enter the lottery for the UTMB World Series Finals. It can also be used as an eligibility requirement for some longer races in the circuit. For example, UTMB states that a runner entering a 100K race may need a valid Index in the 50K, 100K or 100M category, while a runner entering a 100M race may need an Index in the 100K or 100M category.

A runner can obtain or update a valid UTMB Index by finishing a UTMB World Series race or a UTMB Index race in the relevant category. UTMB states that the Index calculation uses results from the previous 36 months once a runner has at least one valid result in a category.

In 2026, UTMB announced changes to the Index methodology, describing the Index as a tool used since 2010 to evaluate trail-running performances across millions of recorded results. UTMB said the updated calculation used a weighted average of a runner's best scores over the previous three years, with stronger and recent scores carrying greater influence. The change was also discussed on a 2026 episode of Singletrack, which described the Index as increasingly significant for race entry, sponsorship, media coverage and comparisons between athletes.

== Running Stones ==
Running Stones are lottery entries for the UTMB World Series Finals at UTMB Mont-Blanc. They are separate from the UTMB Index: the Index establishes eligibility, while Running Stones determine how many chances a runner has in the lottery.

A runner can earn Running Stones by finishing a race at a UTMB World Series Event or UTMB World Series Major. UTMB Index races can generate or update a runner's UTMB Index, while World Series Events and Majors award Running Stones. UTMB states that World Series Events award one Running Stone for 20K races, two for 50K races, three for 100K races and four for 100M races; World Series Majors award double those amounts.

To enter the lottery for the Finals in Chamonix, a runner generally needs both a valid UTMB Index in the relevant category and at least one Running Stone acquired during the relevant qualification period. Each Running Stone gives the runner one chance in the lottery, so additional Running Stones increase the probability of selection.

== Structure ==
The UTMB World Series uses a four-tier structure: Finals, Majors, Events and Index races.

=== Finals ===
The UTMB World Series Finals are held each year during UTMB Mont-Blanc week in Chamonix, France. The Finals are organized by race category: OCC is the 50K Final, CCC is the 100K Final and UTMB is the 100M Final. Men's and women's UTMB World Series titles are awarded in each category.

The Finals are the highest level of the circuit and are connected to the original Ultra-Trail du Mont-Blanc event around Mont Blanc. Entry for most runners is based on a valid UTMB Index in the relevant category and Running Stones used in the lottery for the Chamonix races.

=== Majors ===
UTMB World Series Majors are regional championship-level races within the circuit. They serve as focal events for major trail-running regions and give runners increased access to the Finals. Finishers at Majors receive double the number of Running Stones awarded at standard UTMB World Series Events.

Majors also provide qualification pathways for elite runners. Leading athletes at Majors can qualify directly for the Finals through their performances, while recreational runners use them primarily to collect Running Stones and maintain or improve their UTMB Index.

=== Events ===
UTMB World Series Events form the main body of the circuit. They are branded races held across several continents and usually include races in the 20K, 50K, 100K and 100M categories. Finishers receive Running Stones according to the distance category of the race, and those stones can be used as lottery entries for UTMB Mont-Blanc.

=== Index races ===
UTMB Index races sit outside the branded World Series Event structure but remain part of the wider UTMB qualification system. They allow runners to obtain or update a UTMB Index in the 20K, 50K, 100K or 100M category. Index races count toward a runner's performance rating and can establish eligibility for longer-distance races or for the Finals lottery, while Running Stones are awarded through World Series Events and Majors.

== History ==
=== Origins in UTMB Mont-Blanc ===
The original UTMB race follows the route of the Tour du Mont Blanc, crossing France, Italy and Switzerland, and became one of the central events in international trail ultrarunning. As participation in trail running expanded during the 2000s and 2010s, UTMB Group developed additional races, rankings and entry systems around the Chamonix event, including OCC, CCC and TDS alongside the flagship UTMB race.

The UTMB World Series grew out of the international prominence of Ultra-Trail du Mont-Blanc, first held in 2003 in Chamonix.

Before the creation of the UTMB World Series, international trail races were partly organized through the Ultra-Trail World Tour, a circuit founded in 2013 that linked major long-distance trail races across several continents. The UTWT included races such as UTMB, Western States Endurance Run, Transgrancanaria, Marathon des Sables and Tarawera Ultramarathon. The later UTMB World Series created a tighter branded structure around UTMB Mont-Blanc.

=== Launch and expansion ===
On 6 May 2021, UTMB Group and The IRONMAN Group announced the creation of the UTMB World Series, planned to begin in 2022. The new circuit replaced the Ultra-Trail World Tour and established the Chamonix races at UTMB Mont-Blanc as the annual UTMB World Series Finals.

The first UTMB World Series season in 2022 included races in Europe, Asia, Oceania and the Americas. The calendar expanded during the following years through the acquisition, partnership or rebranding of existing trail races, as well as the creation of new events. Races such as Ultra-Trail Australia, Tarawera Ultramarathon, Istria 100, Val d'Aran, Lavaredo Ultra Trail, Transvulcania, Doi Inthanon Thailand and Canyons Endurance Runs became part of the circuit.

By the mid-2020s, the UTMB World Series had become the largest branded circuit in trail ultrarunning. UTMB's official website described the circuit as including over sixty events across Asia, Oceania, Europe, Africa and the Americas. In 2024, Le Monde reported that the group had announced 51 World Series events in 28 countries for 2025 and had attracted criticism from some independent race organizers over its acquisition and franchising strategy.

== Major events ==
The UTMB World Series calendar changes from year to year. For 2026, UTMB announced a calendar of 64 events across five continents. The announced 2026 events include:

Event	Location	Country or territory	Region	Notes	Ref.
Mountain Ultra-Trail by UTMB	George, South Africa	South Africa	Africa	Mountain event in the Outeniqua Mountains region	
Oh Meu Deus by UTMB	Serra da Estrela	Portugal	Europe	New 2026 World Series event	
Arc of Attrition by UTMB	Cornwall	United Kingdom	Europe	Coastal ultramarathon	
Chianti Ultra Trail by UTMB	Chianti	Italy	Europe	Tuscan trail-running event	
Istria 100 by UTMB	Istria	Croatia	Europe	European spring ultramarathon	
Tenerife Bluetrail by UTMB	Tenerife	Spain	Europe	Mountain race associated with Teide National Park	
Trail Alsace Grand Est by UTMB	Alsace	France	Europe	Race in the Grand Est region	
Ultra-Trail Snowdonia by UTMB	Llanberis	United Kingdom	Europe	Mountain race in Eryri / Snowdonia	
mozart 100 by UTMB	Salzburg	Austria	Europe	Race around Salzburg and nearby lakes	
Grand Raid Ventoux by UTMB	Mont Ventoux	France	Europe	Race around Mont Ventoux	
Trail 100 Andorra by UTMB	Ordino	Andorra	Europe	Pyrenean mountain event	
Trail du Saint-Jacques by UTMB	Haute-Loire	France	Europe	Race linked to the Way of St. James	
Zugspitz Ultra Trail by UTMB	Zugspitze region	Germany	Europe	New 2026 World Series event	
Lavaredo Ultra Trail by UTMB	Cortina d'Ampezzo	Italy	Europe	Race in the Dolomites	
Val d'Aran by UTMB	Val d'Aran	Spain	Europe	2026 Europe Major	
Restonica Trail by UTMB	Corte, Haute-Corse	France	Europe	Mountain race in Corsica	
Trail Verbier St-Bernard by UTMB	Verbier	Switzerland	Europe	Alpine mountain event	
Eiger Ultra-Trail by UTMB	Grindelwald	Switzerland	Europe	Race near the Eiger	
Monte Rosa Walser Waeg by UTMB	Aosta Valley	Italy	Europe	Alpine race near Monte Rosa	
Bucovina Ultra Rocks by UTMB	Bucovina	Romania	Europe	New 2026 World Series event	
Gauja Trail by UTMB	Gauja National Park	Latvia	Europe	New 2026 World Series event	
KAT100 by UTMB	Fieberbrunn	Austria	Europe	Mountain race in the Kitzbühel Alps	
UTMB Mont-Blanc	Chamonix	France	Europe	Annual World Series Finals; includes OCC, CCC and UTMB	
Wildstrubel by UTMB	Crans-Montana, Kandersteg and Adelboden	Switzerland	Europe	Alpine race around the Wildstrubel region	
Kaçkar by UTMB	Kaçkar Mountains	Turkey	Europe / Asia	Mountain race in northeastern Turkey	
Julian Alps Trail Run by UTMB	Kranjska Gora	Slovenia	Europe	Race in the Julian Alps	
Nice Côte d'Azur by UTMB	Nice and the French Riviera	France	Europe	Race linking the Mercantour mountains and the Mediterranean coast	
Puglia by UTMB	Puglia	Italy	Europe	Race in southern Italy	
Kullamannen by UTMB	Mölle	Sweden	Europe	Coastal and forest trail event	
Mallorca by UTMB	Serra de Tramuntana, Mallorca	Spain	Europe	Mediterranean mountain event in a UNESCO World Heritage landscape	
Lake Toba by UTMB	Lake Toba	Indonesia	Asia	Race around a volcanic lake landscape	
Kaga Spa Trail Endurance 100 by UTMB	Kaga, Ishikawa	Japan	Asia	Trail race in Japan	
Malaysia Ultra-Trail by UTMB	Malaysia	Malaysia	Asia	Southeast Asian trail event	
Dajingmen by UTMB	Zhangjiakou	China	Asia	Race in northern China	
TransJeju by UTMB	Jeju Island	South Korea	Asia	Island mountain race	
Mount Yun by UTMB	Shanxi	China	Asia	Chinese mountain trail event	
Shu Dao Mountain by UTMB	Sichuan	China	Asia	Race in western China	
TransLantau by UTMB	Lantau Island	Hong Kong	Asia	Hong Kong trail event	
Chiang Mai Thailand by UTMB	Chiang Mai province	Thailand	Asia-Pacific	2026 Asia-Pacific Major	
Oman by UTMB	Oman	Oman	Asia	New 2026 World Series event	
Amazean Jungle Thailand by UTMB	Betong	Thailand	Asia	Jungle and mountain race in southern Thailand	
Ultra Trail Mogan by UTMB	Mogan Mountain	China	Asia	New 2026 World Series event	
Xiamen by UTMB	Xiamen	China	Asia	Chinese coastal trail event	
Xtrail Kenting by UTMB	Kenting National Park	Taiwan	Asia	New 2026 World Series event	
Torrencial Chile by UTMB	Valdivian temperate forests	Chile	South America	Trail event in southern Chile	
Quito Trail by UTMB	Quito	Ecuador	South America	High-altitude Andean event	
Paraty Brazil by UTMB	Paraty	Brazil	South America	Coastal and rainforest race	
Bariloche by UTMB	Bariloche	Argentina	South America	Patagonian mountain race	
Valhöll Argentina by UTMB	Ushuaia	Argentina	South America	Southern Argentina trail event	
Western States Endurance Run	Olympic Valley to Auburn, California	United States	North America	Historic 100-mile race	
Speedgoat Mountain Races by UTMB	Snowbird, Utah	United States	North America	Mountain race in the Wasatch Range	
Boréalys Mont-Tremblant by UTMB	Mont-Tremblant	Canada	North America	New 2026 World Series event	
Ultra Trail Whistler by UTMB	Whistler, British Columbia	Canada	North America	Mountain event in the Whistler Blackcomb region	
Snowbasin by UTMB	Snowbasin	United States	North America	Mountain race in Utah	
Grindstone Trail Running Festival by UTMB	Virginia	United States	North America	Appalachian mountain event	
Chihuahua by UTMB	Chihuahua	Mexico	North America	Race in northern Mexico	
Kodiak Ultra Marathons by UTMB	Big Bear Lake, California	United States	North America	2026 Americas Major	
Pacific Trails by UTMB	California	United States	North America	Coastal California trail event	
Desert Rats Trail Running Festival by UTMB	Fruita, Colorado	United States	North America	Desert trail-running festival	
Canyons Endurance Runs by UTMB	Auburn, California	United States	North America	Race linked to the Western States trail region	
Rothrock by UTMB	Rothrock State Forest	United States	North America	New 2026 World Series event	
Puerto Vallarta México by UTMB	Puerto Vallarta	Mexico	North America	Coastal and mountain race in western Mexico	
Kosciuszko by UTMB	Thredbo, New South Wales	Australia	Oceania	Race in the Snowy Mountains	
Tarawera by UTMB	Rotorua	New Zealand	Oceania	Major New Zealand trail ultramarathon	
Ultra-Trail Australia by UTMB	Katoomba, New South Wales	Australia	Oceania	2026 Oceania Major	

== Media coverage ==
UTMB Mont-Blanc and UTMB World Series events have been covered by international newspapers, broadcasters, sports magazines and specialist endurance-running publications. Coverage has focused on the original UTMB race in Chamonix, the expansion of the World Series, major race results, elite athletes, safety issues, environmental impact and commercial growth.

In the United Kingdom, The Guardian has covered UTMB Mont-Blanc since at least 2009, describing the race as an extreme mountain-running challenge around Mont Blanc. BBC Sport has covered UTMB Mont-Blanc as a major international ultrarunning event, including race starts, event features and British performances.

French coverage has treated UTMB as both a major sporting event and a growing international endurance business. Le Monde reported on the expansion of UTMB into an international group and examined criticism of its acquisition and franchising strategy. L'Équipe has maintained regular coverage of UTMB Mont-Blanc, including race previews, route changes, broadcasts, environmental measures and elite athletes.

In the United States, Runner's World has covered UTMB Mont-Blanc through race previews, athlete features, viewing guides and results reports. Specialist publications such as iRunFar and Outside have produced race previews, results reports, course analysis and commentary on professional trail running.

=== Whistler dispute ===
In October 2023, UTMB and Vail Resorts announced Ultra Trail Whistler by UTMB in Whistler, British Columbia. The announcement drew criticism because it followed the departure of the locally organized Whistler Alpine Meadows races from the Whistler Blackcomb area. Canadian Running Magazine, iRunFar and local British Columbia media reported criticism from runners and organizers who viewed the new event as an example of UTMB's expansion into spaces previously occupied by independent local races. UTMB later published an open letter stating that the organizers of the previous local race had already indicated that they would leave Whistler before the UTMB event was created.

=== Athlete governance discussion ===
In January 2024, a private email associated with elite runners Kílian Jornet and Zach Miller was leaked publicly. The email raised concerns about UTMB's expansion, the role of The IRONMAN Group, athlete representation and communication with elite runners. Jornet and Miller later met with UTMB representatives. Trail Runner reported that the meeting addressed rapid expansion, sporting rules and communication with elite athletes.

== See also ==
- Ultra-Trail du Mont-Blanc
- Trail running
- Ultramarathon
- International Trail Running Association
