= Courmayeur–Champex–Chamonix =

101 km ultramarathon trail race, a half-tour of Mont-Blanc

The Ultra-Trail Courmayeur-Champex-Chamonix (CCC) is a mountain ultramarathon held as part of the Ultra-Trail du Mont-Blanc event. It starts in Courmayeur, Italy, passes through Champex-Lac, Switzerland, and finishes in Chamonix, France. First held in 2006, the race serves as the 100K final of the UTMB World Series.

== History ==
Organizers introduced the CCC at the fourth edition of the Ultra-Trail du Mont-Blanc in response to growing demand for entries. They based it on the second half of the original UTMB route, with a start in Courmayeur and the same finish in Chamonix. The inaugural course covered 86 km. Corinne Favre finished first overall in 10 hours, 35 minutes and 55 seconds, ahead of men's winner Alun Powell.

The course measured 98 km in 2008 and 101 km in 2013. The 2020 race was cancelled along with the other UTMB Mont-Blanc events during the COVID-19 pandemic. In 2023, the CCC hosted the 100K race at the inaugural UTMB World Series Finals. Jonathan Albon and Yngvild Kaspersen won that edition.

== Course ==
From Courmayeur, the route climbs to the Grand Col Ferret, where it crosses from Italy into Switzerland. It continues through La Fouly, Champex-Lac and Trient, then re-enters France near Vallorcine before descending into Chamonix.

Course distance and elevation gain vary by edition. The 2022 race covered 101 km with about 6,100 m of climbing. That year, Petter Engdahl and Blandine L'Hirondel set men's and women's records for that version of the course, finishing in 9:53:02 and 11:40:55, respectively.

Weather shortened the 2012 race to 86 km. In 2026, a weather-related reroute brought the distance to about 108 km, with 6,200 m of climbing.

== Results ==
CCC winners by year
Year	Distance (km)	Starters	Finishers	Men's winner	Time	Women's winner	Time	Sources
2006	86	—	854	Alun Powell (United Kingdom)	10:53:17	Corinne Favre (France)	10:35:55	
2007	86.5	1,609	1,330	Julien Chorier (France)	10:19:46	Andréa Zimmermann (Switzerland)	12:28:05	Archived results
2008	98	2,032	1,315	Guillaume Le Normand (France)	12:26:04	Lucy Colquhoun (United Kingdom)	14:33:37	Archived results
2009	98	1,865	1,266	Jean-Yves Rey (Switzerland)	11:40:47	Chantal Begue (France)	16:51:00	Archived results
2010	98	—	444 (Note: The results database lists 444 classified finishers for this edition.)	Xavier Thévenard (France)	11:57:13	Maud Giraud (France)	14:07:38	Archived results
2011	98	1,907	1,591	Emmanuel Gault (France)	10:10:25	Virginie Govignon (France)	12:47:11	Archived results
2012	86 (Note: Organizers shortened the course because of severe weather.)	1,913	1,585	Tòfol Castanyer (Spain)	08:57:04	Ellie Greenwood (United Kingdom)	11:17:24	Archived results
2013	101	1,910	1,320	Jordi Bes (Spain)	11:23:01	Caroline Chaverot (France)	14:12:00	Archived results
2014	101	1,945	1,423	Pau Bartoló (Spain)	11:21:16	Anne-Lise Rousset (France)	14:28:48	Archived results
2015	101	2,127	1,470	Zach Miller (United States)	11:53:32	Ruth Croft (New Zealand)	12:54:53	Archived results
2016	101	2,123	1,386	Michel Lanne (France)	12:10:04	Mimmi Kotka (Sweden)	13:42:46	Archived results
2017	101	2,155	1,742	Hayden Hawks (United States)	10:24:30	Clare Gallagher (United States)	12:13:57	Archived results
2018	101	2,147	1,622	Tom Evans (United Kingdom)	10:44:32	Miao Yao (China)	11:57:46	
2019	101	2,132	1,577	Luis Alberto Hernando (Spain)	10:28:49	Ragna Debats (Netherlands)	12:10:33	
2020	Cancelled due to the COVID-19 pandemic							
2021	101	2,009	1,578	Thibaut Garrivier (France)	10:23:26	Marta Molist Codina (Spain)	12:50:48	
2022	101	2,113	1,727	Petter Engdahl (Sweden)	09:53:02	Blandine L'Hirondel (France)	11:40:55	
2023	100	2,228	1,650	Jonathan Albon (United Kingdom)	10:14:25	Yngvild Kaspersen (Norway)	11:51:22	Official results
2024	101	2,269	1,636	Hayden Hawks (United States)	10:20:11	Toni McCann (South Africa)	11:57:59	Official results
2025	101	2,127	1,641	Francesco Puppi (Italy)	10:06:02	Martyna Młynarczyk (Poland)	11:41:55	Official results
2026	108	1,974	1,516	Cristian Minoggio (Italy)	10:21:48	Yngvild Kaspersen (Norway)	12:01:14	Official results
