= Ben Dhiman =

American ultratrail runner

Personal information
- Nationality: United States
- Born: November 6, 1991 (age 34)
- Home town: Cincinnati, Ohio
- Years active: 2018–present
- Spouse: Ophélie
- Website: SpeedHiman.com

Sport
- Sport: Trail running, Ultra running
- Rank: 945 UTMB Index; 942 iTRA Index (as of August 2026)
- Team: ASICS Trail

Ben Dhiman is an American professional athlete competing in trail running.

In 2026, Dhiman set a new course record for the Ultra-Trail du Mont-Blanc with a time of 18:16:29, becoming the first person to finish the race in less than 19 hours and the second American to win.

== Early life and career ==
Dhiman graduated from Sycamore High School (Ohio) in 2010. He was a stand out soccer player and went on to play in college for Emory University.

Dhiman has completed several long-distance hikes, including the Appalachian Trail in 2012 and the Continental Divide Trail in 2016.

== Personal life ==
Dhiman is the father of three children. He lives and trains full time in Soues, Hautes-Pyrénées.

== Notable race results ==
=== 2026 results ===
Place	Race	Distance	Location	Time	Source
1st	Ultra-Trail du Mont-Blanc	174 km	Chamonix, France	18:16:29	
2nd	Marathon du Mont Blanc 90 km	88.8 km	Chamonix, France	9:38:02	
5th	Transvulcania La Palma Island	73 km	La Palma, Canary Islands	6:48:42	

=== 2025 results ===
Place	Race	Distance	Location	Time	Source
2nd	Ultra-Trail du Mont-Blanc	174 km	Chamonix, France	19:51:37	
1st	Lavaredo Ultra Trail	120 km	Cortina d'Ampezzo, Italy	11:49:16	
1st	Grand Raid Ventoux by UTMB	100 km	Malaucène, France	7:35:47	

=== 2024 results ===
Place	Race	Distance	Location	Time	Source
2nd	La Asics La SaintéLyon	82 km	Saint-Étienne, France	6:03:25	
3rd	Grand Raid de La Réunion	175 km	Réunion	24:42:53	
2nd	Trail 100 Andorra by UTMB	105 km	Ordino, Andorra	13:25:36	
1st	Madeira Island Ultra-Trail	115 km	Madeira, Portugal	13:52:46	

=== 2023 results ===
Place	Race	Distance	Location	Time	Source
3rd	Grand Trail des Templiers	80 km	Millau, France	7:00:19	
1st	Grand Trail de la Vallée d'Ossau	37.2 km	Laruns, France	3:50:55	
1st	Trail 100 Andorra by UTMB	105 km	Ordino, Andorra	13:36:38	
1st	ASICS Penyagolosa Trails CSP	106 km	Castellón de la Plana, Spain	10:35:48	
