= IAU Trail World Championships =

Annual trail running World Championships

Trail World Championships
- Status: active
- Genre: sporting event
- Date: mid-year
- Frequency: annual
- Location: various
- Inaugurated: 2007
- Most recent: 2019
- Organiser: IAU

The IAU Trail World Championships are annual trail running World Championships, from 2007 up to 2015 was biennial, held for the first time in Huntsville, United States in 2007 and organised by International Association of Ultrarunners.

The 2021 World Mountain and Trail Running Championships (abbreviated WMTRC 2021), held in Chiang Mai, Thailand, from November 4–6, 2022, combined the World Mountain Running Championships and IAU Trail World Championships. Events since then have been combined into the World Mountain and Trail Running Championships.

== Editions ==
	Year	Date	Venue	Country	Distance	Arrived at the finish	Notes
1st	2007	8 December	Huntsville, 18. Sunmart Texas Trail	United States	80.5 km	172 (128 m, 44 w)	Results, Results
2nd	2009	12 July	Serre Chevalier, Merrell Sky Race	France	68 km	46 (32 m, 14 w)	Results
3rd	2011	9 July	Connemara	Ireland	71.5 km	98 (68 m, 30 w)	Results, Results
4th	2013	6 July	Llanrwst; Wales	United Kingdom	75 km	99 (53 m, 46 w)	Report, Results, Results (xls 84kb)
5th	2015	30 May	Annecy, 4. Maxi Race du Lac d'Annecy	France	84 km	229 (144 m, 85 w)	Report, Results
6th	2016	29 October	Braga, Trans Peneda-Gerês	Portugal	85 km	203 (119 m, 84 w)	Report, Results
7th	2017	10 June	Badia Prataglia, Sacred Forests	Italy	50 km	239 (138 m, 101 w)	Report, Results
8th	2018	12 May	Castellón de la Plana, 18. Penyagolosa Trails HG	Spain	85.3 km	263 (159 m, 104 w)	Results
9th	2019	8 June	Miranda do Corvo, Trilhos dos Abutres	Portugal	44.2 km	363 (204 m, 159 w)	Results

== Results ==
=== Men ===
	Gold	Silver	Bronze
2007	(Poland) Jarosław Janicki	(Belgium) Marc Vanderlinden	(Luxembourg) José Azevedo
2009	(France) Thomas Lorblanchet	(Nepal) Dachhiri Sherpa	(Germany) Matthias Dippacher
2011	(France) Erik Clavery	(Canada) Jason Loutitt	(France) Patrick Bringer
2013	(United Kingdom) Ricky Lightfoot	(Germany) Florian Neuschwander	(France) Julien Rancon
2015	(France) Sylvain Court	(Spain) Luis Alberto Hernando	(France) Patrick Bringer
2016	(Spain) Luis Alberto Hernando	(France) Nicolas Martin	(France) Sylvain Court
2017	(Spain) Luis Alberto Hernando	(Spain) Cristofer Clemente	(France) Cedric Fleureton
2018	(Spain) Luis Alberto Hernando	(Spain) Cristofer Clemente	(United Kingdom) Thomas Evans
2019	(United Kingdom) Jonathan Albon	(France) Julien Rancon	(Switzerland) Christian Mathys

=== Women ===
	Gold	Silver	Bronze
2007	(Japan) Norimi Sakurai	(Republic of Ireland) Helena Crossan	(United Kingdom) Adela Salt
2009	(Italy) Cecilia Mora	(United Kingdom) Angela Mudge	(United Kingdom) Lizzy Hawker
2011	(France) Maud Gobert	(Italy) Cecilia Mora	(United Kingdom) Lucy Colquhoun
2013	(France) Nathalie Mauclair	(France) Aurélia Truel	(Italy) Maria Chiara Parigi
2015	(France) Nathalie Mauclair	(France) Caroline Chaverot	(Spain) Maite Maiora
2016	(France) Caroline Chaverot	(Spain) Azara García	(Netherlands) Ragna Debats
2017	(France) Adeline Roche	(France) Amandine Ferrato	(Italy) Silvia Rampazzo
2018	(Netherlands) Ragna Debats	(Spain) Laia Cañes	(France) Claire Mougel
2019	(France) Blandine L'Hirondel	(New Zealand) Ruth Croft	(Spain) Sheila Avilés

== See also ==
- IAU 50 km World Championships
- IAU 100 km World Championships
- IAU 24 Hour World Championship
- World Long Distance Mountain Running Championships
