= Ekaterina Mityaeva =

Russian athlete

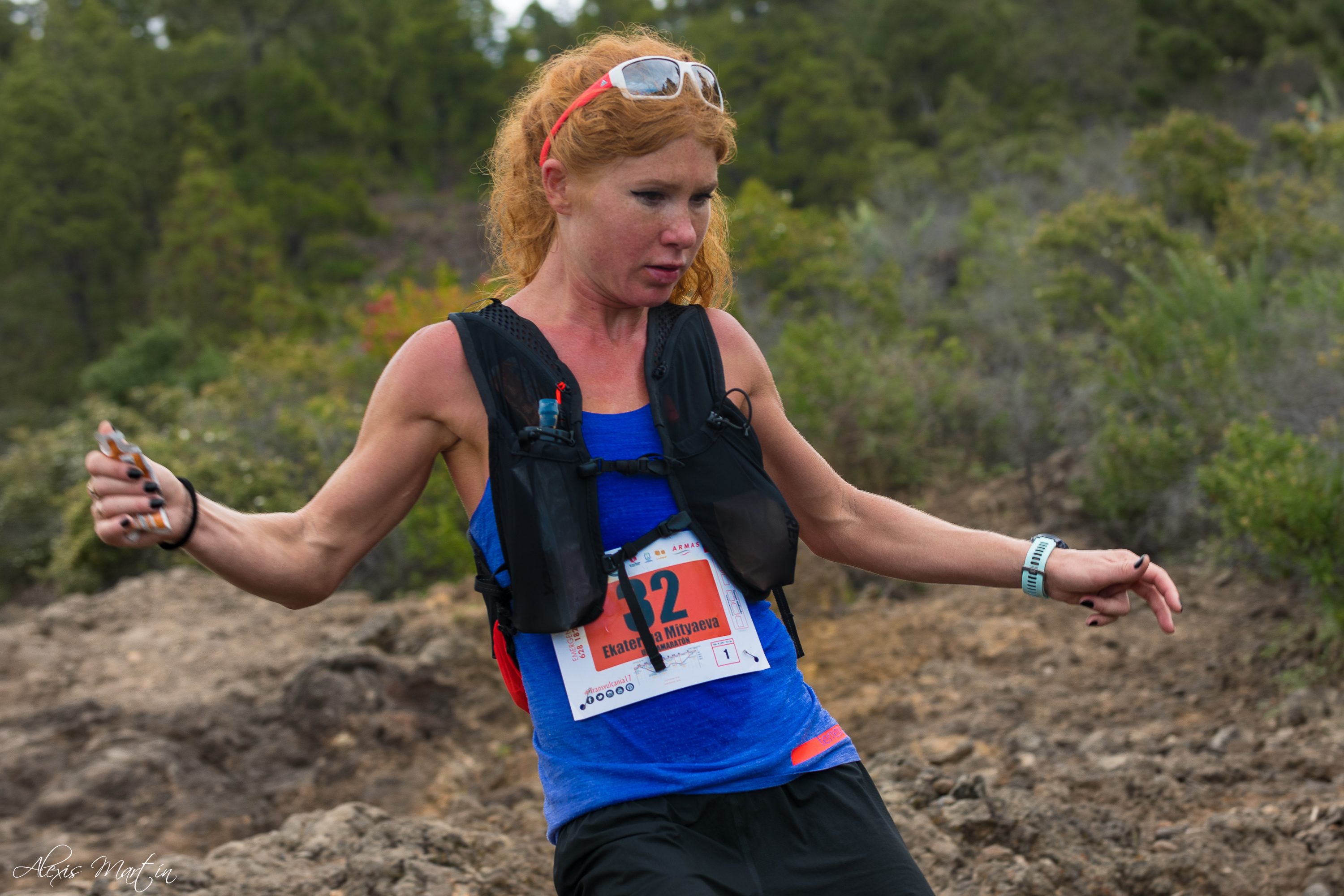
- Ekaterina Mityaeva at 2017 Transvulcania.

Personal information
- Nationality: Russian
- Born: 15 February 1989 (age 37) Pokhvistnevo, Samara Oblast, Russia
- Life partner: Dmitry Mityaev
- Website: trailrunningschool.com
Medal record
Skyrunning
2018
Gold medal – first place	Ultra Pirineu 110 km, Spain	Ultra
Bronze medal – third place	High Trail Vanoise 70 km, France	Ultra
2017
Bronze medal – third place	Ultra Pirineu 110 km, Spain	Ultra
Bronze medal – third place	Royal Ultra Sky Marathon 56 km, Italy	Ultra
Silver medal – second place	Ultra SkyMarathon Madeira 55 km, Portugal	Ultra
2016
Bronze medal – third place	Skyrunning World Championships, France	Trail
Trail Running
2023
Gold medal – first place	Innsbruck Alpine Trailrun Festival (K42) 47 km, Austria	Marathon
2020
Gold medal – first place	Desafio En Las Nubes 60 km, Mexico	Ultra
2019
Gold medal – first place	Adidas Infinite Trails World Championships 125 km, Austria	Relay
2018
Bronze medal – third place	Transgrancanaria HG, Trans GC 127 km, Spain	Ultra
Gold medal – first place	Trilhos Dos Abutres, 50 km, Portugal	Ultra
2017
Bronze medal – third place	Marathon du Mont Blanc 91 km, France	Ultra
2016
Bronze medal – third place	Marathon du Mont Blanc 42 km, France	Marathon
ARDF
2008
Gold medal – first place	14th ARDF World Championships 2-m-band, Korea	Team
Silver medal – second place	14th ARDF World Championships 2-m-band, Korea	Individual
Bronze medal – third place	14th ARDF World Championships 80-m-band, Korea	Team
Red Bull 400
2018
Gold medal – first place	Red Bull 400 Chaykovskiy, Russia	Vertikal
2017
Gold medal – first place	Red Bull 400 Chaykovskiy, Russia	Vertikal
Gold medal – first place	Red Bull 400, Russia	Vertikal

Ekaterina Mityaeva (nee Filippova, born 15 February 1989) is a Russian athlete specializing in trail running, skyrunning, mountain running and ultra running. She is a winner and prize-winner of the international competitions and Championships of Russia.

She became bronze medalist of Marathon du Mont Blanc in 2016 and 2017, Ultra Pirineu 110 km in 2017, Transgrancanaria 127 km in 2018 and won Ultra Pirineu 110 km in 2018 and High Trail Vanoise 20 km in 2019.

Ekaterina came 4th at Ultra-Trail du Mont-Blanc (UTMB) 170 km in 2019 showing the best result in history among athletes from Russia - 25:53:26.

She also holds Master of Sports of Russia in five different endurance disciplines – athletics, skyrunning, ski mountaineering, orienteering and radio orienteering (ARDF).

== Biography ==
Ekaterina was born on February 15, 1989 in the city of Pokhvistnevo (Samara region). In 2013 she graduated from the Kuban State University of Physical Culture, Sports and Tourism with a degree in physical culture and sport.

Ekaterina started running at school at the age of 10 participating in school competitions. At 14 (2003) she decided to try orienteering, and in 2006 she started radio orienteering (ARDF). After 2 years she took part in the 14th ARDF World Championships in Seoul, where she took gold, silver and bronze medals in different categories. Ekaterina had also been doing athletics to get faster for orienteering.

In 2010 at an orienteering competition Ekaterina met Dmitry Mityaev. The pair became inseparable, training, competing and winning together. In 2011 Ekaterina and Dmitry decided to give road running a shot and started training for the 2012 Moscow International Marathon. The result was 02:43:49.

Ekaterina's first trail start was Konzhak Marathon in the Ural Mountains in 2013 where she came 2nd, since then she has been engaged in trail running and skyrunning.

In 2014, with the support of Adidas Terrex, Ekaterina and Dmitry created their online Trail Running School, where Ekaterina trains girls, and Dmitry trains men. The couple also organizes training camps, where they teach the technique of running and walking in the mountains.

== More Results ==
=== Skyrunning ===
2014

- 10th, Skyrunning World Championships, Vertical Kilometer, France
- 10th, Skyrunning World Championships, SkyMarathon, France

2015

- 11th, Skyrunning European Championships, SkyMarathon, Zegama
- 7th, 2015 Skyrunner World Series, SkyRace
- 4th, Skyrunning World Championships, Vertical Kilometer, France
- 9th, Dolomites SkyRace 22 km, Italy
- 6th, Lantau 2 Peaks Skyrunning 23 km, China
- 8th, Limone Extreme 24 km, Italy
- 1st, National Skyrunning Championship, Konzhak Skymarathon 30 km, Russia
- 2nd, National Skyrunning Championship 20 km, Russia

2016

- 1st, High Trail Vanoise 18 km, France
- 5th, Skyrunning World Championships, Vertical Kilometer, France
- 10th, 2016 Skyrunner World Series, Ultra
- 7th, Dolomites SkyRace 22 km, Italy
- 7th, SkyRace Comapedrosa 22 km, Spain
- 4th, Ultra Pirineu 1109 km, Spain
- 8th, Buff Epic Trail Aiguestortes 40 km, Spain
- 1st, Sugar Marathon 2016. National Skyrunning Championship 40 km, Russia

2017

- 1st, High Trail Vanoise 20 km, France
- 1st, Santana Vertikal Kilometer, Portugal
- 9th, 2017 Skyrunner World Series, SkyExtreme
- 4th, 2017 Skyrunner World Series, Ultra
- 7th, Transvulcania Ultramarathon La Palma Island 73 km, Spain

2018

- 4th, 2018 Skyrunner World Series, SkyExtra
- 5th, Ultra SkyMarathon Madeira 55 km, Portugal
- 9th, Trofeo Kima 50 km, Italy
- 5th, Transvulcania Ultramarathon La Palma Island 73 km, Spain

2019

- 1st, Odlo High Trail Vanoise, Les Balcons, 20 km, France
- 4th, Transvulcania Ultramarathon La Palma Island 74 km, Spain

=== Trail Running ===
2014

- 11th, Marathon du Mont Blanc, 41 km, France

2015

- 1st, Elbrus World Race Trail, 34 km, Russia

2016

- 1st, Elbrus World Race Trail 34 km, Russia

2017

- 1st, Samoëns Trail Tour 18 km, France
- 1st, Elbrus World Race Marathon 46 km, Russia

2018

- 1st, Alanya Ultra, Taurus Mountain Marathon 45 km, Turkey

2019

- 4th, Ultra-Trail du Mont-Blanc (UTMB) 170 km, France
- 1st, Alpindustria Elbrus Race Marathon 46 km, Russia
- 5th, Vibram Hong Kong 104 km, China

2020

- 1st, Hoka Wild Trail 80 km, Russia

2023

- 1st, Innsbruck Alpine Trail Festival (K42) 47 km, Austria

=== Marathon ===
2012

- 9th, Moscow International Marathon, National Championship, Russia

2013

- 1st, Volgograd International Marathon, Russia

=== Mountain Running ===
2014

- 27th, European Mountain Running Championships
- 22nd, World Mountain Running Championships, Italy

2015

- 28th, World Mountain Running Championships, Great Britain
- 2nd, Russian Cup and Open Championship of Sochi, 5860 m, Russia
- 4th, XIV Championship of Russia in mountain running, 5 km, Russia
- 1st, Cup of Russia, 4650 m, Russia
- 4th, XII Russian Championship and I CIS Championship, 6900 m, Russia
- 2nd, XIII Russian Championship and I CIS Championship, 5 km, Russia
- 4th, VII Russian Long-Distance Mountain Running Championship, 30 km, Russia
- 2nd, Russian Cup, Stage 16 of the Russian Grand Prix, 5700 m, Russia
