= UTMB =

UTMB may refer to:

- University of Texas Medical Branch
- Ultra-Trail du Mont-Blanc, single-stage mountain ultramarathon
