= 2019 Trail World Championships =

- Location: Miranda do Corvo, Portugal
- Date: 8 June 2019
- Competitors: c. 400 from 50 nations

Champions
- Men: Jonathan Albon
- Women: Blandine L'Hirondel

The 2019 Trail World Championships was the ninth edition of the global trail running competition, organised by the International Association of Ultrarunners (IAU) and the International Trail Running Association (ITRA). It was held on 8 June 2019 in Miranda do Corvo, Portugal. The event was hosted by the annual Ultra Trilhos dos Abutres (Vultures Trail) and featured a 44 km course with uphills totalling 2120 m and downhills totalling 1970 m. Great Britain's Jonathan Albon won the men's individual race, while France's Blandine L'Hirondel won the women's individual race. France won both the men's and women's team rankings.

== Results ==
=== Men ===
Event	Gold		Silver		Bronze	
Individual	Jonathan Albon; Great Britain	3:35:34	Julien Rancon; France	3:37:47	Christian Mathys; Switzerland	3:40:34
Team	France		Great Britain		Spain	

=== Women ===
Event	Gold		Silver		Bronze	
Individual	Blandine L'Hirondel; France	4:06:15	Ruth Croft; New Zealand	4:14:27	Sheila Avilés; Spain	4:15:03
Team	France		Spain		Romania	
