= Trans Japan Alps Race =

Japanese marathon event

- Date: Biannual August
- Location: Toyama - Shizuoka, Japan
- Event type: Mountain Ultra Trail race / Ultramarathon mountain race
- Distance: 415 km (258 miles) elevation 27,000 m (89,000 ft)
- Established: 2002
- Course records: 4 days 17 hours 33 min (2022); Takashi Doi
- Website: www.tjar.jp

Trans Japan Alps Race (TJAR) is a mountain ultra-trail race (a 415 km ultramarathon with a total elevation gain of approximately 27,000 m) that takes place on roughly half roads and half trails in the Japanese Alps mountains. It has been held every other year since 2002 and is known as the most demanding race in Japan.

Despite its immense difficulty, winners receive no prize money or awards of any kind. Competitors must carry a long list of required gear and the race is run self-supported, meaning that they are responsible for carrying and resupplying all of their own water and food in the mountain sections, and they must sleep in a bivouac shelter which they carry. No pacers, crew or external support of any kind is allowed. Because of the demanding nature of the race and the small number (up to 30) of allowed competitors, the qualifying standards are higher than those of any other races held in Japan, and they are more stringent than most around the world. The major reason for dropping out of the race is hypothermia due to severe wind and rain in the high altitude mountain regions.

== Race ==
=== Course ===
The race starts at Toyama Bay in Sea of Japan at midnight and ends at Suruga Bay in the Pacific Ocean. Runners must cross traverse the Japanese Alps, Hida Mountains, the Kiso Mountains and the Akaishi Mountains. It is regarded as the most demanding trail race in Japan. The majority of competitors suffer hallucination due to stress and lack of sleep. Participants who cannot finish the race within 8 days are disqualified.

=== Rules ===
(Excerpt) Participants are required to go through 30 check points and finish within 8 days without using any transportation/devices other than their own feet. During the race, use of mountain huts for lodging is prohibited and competitors use their own bivouac shelters to sleep. Furthermore, as of the 2021 race, it will be impermissible for athletes to replenish with food or drinks other than water at huts in the mountain sections of the course. Aid from friends/family/team is strictly prohibited along the entire route. Participants are allowed, however, to mail a self-addressed resupply package to one designated location just beyond the halfway point in Ichinose. There in Ichinose they may resupply and/or swap out items, and mail any items back to themselves that they will not use for the remainder of the race. Hiking manners and respect for nature and others comes first. Throwing materials in the race is prohibited. Violation of any rules will result in disqualification.

=== Participation ===
A maximum of 30 participants who have passed the qualifying standards set by the TJAR committee are allowed to run the race. The requirements include an experience of camping more than 10 days at altitudes over 2,000 m (6,600 ft), experience of bivouacking more than 4 times at altitudes over 2000 m after hiking more than 20 hours of map time, experience of finishing a trail race over 70 km, achievement of a full marathon time of 3:20 or less or 100 km time of 10:30 or less, ability of risk management and emergency measures in mountains, Japanese language ability sufficient to communicate, a medical certificate, and a mountaineering insurance that preferably includes death benefit. If the number of applications which satisfy all the requirements exceeds the limit, the committee selects more experienced applicants with more serious training.

As of 2024, the minimum age for finishers of these races was 21 and the maximum age was 58. For the first time, a foreign national participated in the 2024 race. This person was a U.S. citizen living in Tokyo.

=== GPS ===
The location of each competitor is tracked by the GPS device and is shown online during the race.

=== Prize ===
The race does not offer any prize money for winners.

=== Sponsors ===
The official sponsor of the race is The North Face.

== Results ==
- 2002: 1 finished out of 4 participants. Winner: Mikio Iwase (7 days 5 hours 7 min).
- 2004: 6 finished out of 9 participants. Winner: Masato Tanaka (6 days 2 hours 0 min).
- 2006: 2 finished out of 6 participants. Winner: Chigaya Mase (7 days 10 hours 48 min).
- 2008: 15 finished out of 20 participants. Winner: Masato Tanaka (5 days 10 hours 32 min).
- 2010: 15 finished out of 23 participants. Winner: Mochizuki Shougo (5 days 5 hours 22 minutes)
- 2012: 18 finished out of 28 participants. Winner: Mochizuki Shougo. (5 days 6 hours 24 min). With the exception of the 2014 race, documentaries have been broadcast on NHK since the 2012 race.
- 2014: 15 finished out of 30 participants. Winner: Mochizuki Shougo (5 days 12 hours 57 min). Time limit was extended by 3 hours due to Typhoon.
- 2016: 25 finished out of 29 participants. Winner: Mochizuki Shougo (4 days 23 hours 52 min)
- 2018: 27 finished out of 30 participants. Winner: Kousuke kaitou (6 days 1 hours 22 min)
- 2020 (2021): Canceled in the middle of the second day due to inclement weather.
- 2022: 20 finished out of 30 participants. Winner: Takashi Doi (4 days 17 hours 33 min)
- 2024: 21 finished out of 30 participants. Winner: Takashi Doi (5 days 1 hours 26 min)

== See also ==
- Ultramarathon
- Ultra-Trail du Mont-Blanc
