= Soues =

Soues is the name of two places in France:

- Soues, Hautes-Pyrénées, a town and commune in the Hautes-Pyrénées département of south-western France
- Soues, Somme, a town and commune in the Somme département of northern France
