= Zach Miller =

Zach Miller may refer to:

- Zach Miller (tight end, born 1984), NFL tight end for the Jacksonville Jaguars, Tampa Bay Buccaneers, and Chicago Bears
- Zach Miller (tight end, born 1985), former NFL tight end for the Oakland Raiders and Seattle Seahawks
- Zach Miller (runner), an American professional trail and ultramarathon runner
- Zach Miller (snowboarder), American snowboarder
- Zach Miller, a member of the band Dr. Dog
