= Mityaev =

Mityaev (masculine, Russian: Митяев) or Mityaeva (feminine, Russian: Митяева) is a Russian surname. Notable people with the surname include:

- Ekaterina Mityaeva (born 1989), Russian athlete
- Galina Mityaeva (born 1984), Tajikistani hammer thrower
- Oleg Mityaev (born 1956), Russian bard, musician and actor
- Oleg Mityaev (general) (born c.1974), Russian lieutenant general
