= Aurélia Truel =

French ultramarathon runner

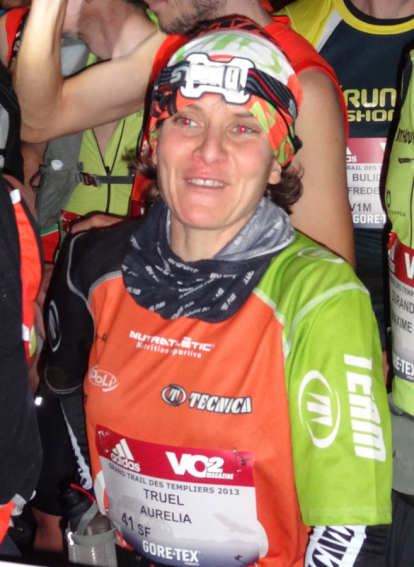
- Truel at the 2013 Festival des Templiers

Personal information
- Born: 4 April 1975 (age 51) Ivry-sur-Seine, France
- Height: 154 cm (5 ft 1 in)
- Weight: 46 kg (101 lb)
Medal record
Trail running
Representing France
World Championships
Gold medal – first place	2011 Connemara	Team event
Silver medal – second place	2013 Llanrwst	Individual event
Gold medal – first place	2013 Llanrwst	Team event
Gold medal – first place	2016 Braga	Team event

Aurélia Truel (born 4 April 1975) is a French ultramarathon runner, who specialises in trail running. She came second at the 2013 IAU Trail World Championships in Llanrwst, Wales, and was part of teams that won the 2011, 2013 and 2016 Trail World Championship team events.

== Early life ==
Truel was born in Ivry-sur-Seine, France. Aged 10, Truel started playing handball, and at the same time she started running, initially focusing on middle-distance running. She quit handball after deciding that she was too short to be competitive. Truel ran her first half-marathon in 1995 in Nogent-sur-Marne.

== Career ==
Truel competed in her first trail event at the 2008 Festival des Templiers in the Grands Causses, France. In 2009, she came 21st overall and second female at the Le Trail de la Côte d'Opale event, and third female at the Les Gendarmes et les Voleurs de Temps event. In 2010, she came third at the Festival des Templiers. Truel was selected for the 2011 IAU Trail World Championships in Connemara, Ireland. She finished fourth in the individual event, and won the team event. In the same year, she won the Éco-Trail de Paris Île-de-France, and the Le Trail de la Côte d'Opale.

In 2012, Truel won the Festival des Templiers event. At the 2013 Trail World Championships in Llanrwst, Wales, Truel came second in the individual event, and retained her title in the team event. In the same year, she finished third at the Festival des Templiers event.

In 2014, Truel won the Éco-Trail de Paris Île-de-France again, as well as the Maxi-Race du Lac d'Annecy. In 2016, Truel came 11th at the IAU Trail World Championships in Braga, Portugal, and won the team event again. In 2017, Truel won the Marathon international du beaujolais. It was her first participation at the event.

== Publications ==
- Truel, Aurélia, Aubineau, Nicolas (2017) Trail: Coaching nutrition (in French) Fleurus ISBN 9782317015625
