= Rory Bosio =

American athlete

- Born: Rory Bosio; August 13, 1984; Lake, Tahoe, CA, United States
- Occupations: Nurse, Trail runner
- Years active: 2003-

Rory Bosio is an American ultramarathon runner. She specializes in mountain running, and won the 2013 and 2014 Ultra-Trail du Mont-Blanc.

Bosio is a pediatric intensive care nurse from Truckee, California, United States. She grew up in Truckee attending North Tahoe High School, where she ran her first 1-mile race at the age of 8. In 8th grade, she won her local cross country championships, and later spent time hiking and mountain climbing around the Sierra Nevada. In 2007, she graduated from the University of Davis, California.

Bosio spent 10 months in 2015 filming for the reality documentary series Boundless for its third season on Travel+Escape Channel and Esquire Network. Rory has been a sponsored athlete with The North Face and CamelBak.

== Results ==
Year	Event	Rank
2007	1st women Silver State 50/50	4th overall
2010	Western States Endurance Run	4th
2011	Western States Endurance Run	5th
2012	Western States Endurance Run	2nd
2012	Mt Mitchell Challenge 40 mile	1st
2013	Way Too Cool 50K Endurance Run	2nd
2013	Ultra-Trail du Mont-Blanc	1st, 7th overall
2014	Lavaredo Ultra-Trail	1st
2014	Ultra-Trail du Mont-Blanc	1st
2014	Ultra-Trail World Tour 2014	9th
2015	Atacama Extreme 100 Miles	1st
2016	Lavaredo Ultra Trail	14th
2016	North Face Challenge, Utah	1st, 10th overall
2017	Tahoe Rim Trail 50M Endurance Run	1st overall
2017	The Broken Arrow Skyrace	5th
2017	Orsières-Champex-Chamonix (OCC)	6th
2018	The Broken Arrow Skyrace	3rd, 13th overall
2018	Ultra-Trail du Mont-Blanc	2nd, 26th overall
2019	Ushuaia by UTMB - 130K - Tierra del Fuego	1st, 9th overall
2019	Ultra-Trail du Mont-Blanc	8th, 68th overall
