= Canton of Aureilhan =

Coordinates: 43.24°N 0.10°E

The canton of Aureilhan is an administrative division of the Hautes-Pyrénées department, southwestern France. Its borders were modified at the French canton reorganisation which came into effect in March 2015. Its seat is in Aureilhan.

It consists of the following communes:

1. Aureilhan
2. Séméac
3. Soues
