= Ultra Pirineu =

- Date: September
- Location: (Spain) Bagà
- Event type: Sky Ultra
- Distance: 110 km / 6800 m
- Established: 2014
- Website: Ultra Pirineu

Ultra Pirineu is an international skyrunning competition held for the first time in 2009 under the name Cavalls del Vent. It has been known as Ultra Pirineu since the 2014 edition. It takes place in Bagà, Catalonia, Spain, in September each year. The race has formed part of the Skyrunner World Series.

== Races ==
- Ultra Pirineu Marathon, an Ultra SkyMarathon (110 km / 6800 m elevation)
- Pirineu Marathon, a SkyMarathon (45 km / 2400 m elevation)
- Nit Pirineu, a Vertical Kilometer (5 km / 860 m elevation)

== Editions ==
Race of Skyrunner World Series
Record of the race

Edition	Year	Men's winner	Time	Women's winner	Time
80 km and 5,800 m D+
I	2009	(Spain) Jessed Hernàndez	9:31.35	(France) Corinne Favre	11:55.52
84 km and 6,000 m D+
II	2010	(Spain) Miguel Heras	9:06.39	(Spain) Nerea Martínez	12:14.50
III	2011	(Spain) Miguel Heras	8:57.32	(Spain) Núria Picas	11:37.43
IV	2012	(Spain) Kilian Jornet	8:42:23	(Spain) Núria Picas	10:34:18
100 km and 6,600 m D+
V	2013	(Spain) Luis Alberto Hernando	10:23:15	(Spain) Núria Picas	12:05:46
103 km and 6,324 m D+ (Ultra Pirineu)
VI	2014	(Spain) Luis Alberto Hernando	11:15:14	(Spain) Núria Picas	12:39:02
110 km and 6,800 m D+ (Ultra Pirineu)
VII	2015	(Spain) Kilian Jornet	12:03:27	(Sweden) Emelie Forsberg	13:39:33
VIII	2016	(Spain) Miguel Heras	12:05:51	(Spain) Gemma Arenas Alcázar	15:20:34
IX	2017	(Spain) Pablo Villa González	12:30:19	(Spain) Maite Maiora	14:22:19
X	2018	(Spain) Jessed Hernandez	12:35:36	(Russia) Ekaterina Mityaeva	15:12:24
94 km and 6,200 m D+ (Ultra Pirineu)
XI	2019	(Russia) Dmitry Mityaev	10:22:55	(Spain) Mónica Comas	12:31:10

== See also ==
- Skyrunner World Series
