= Aureilhan, Hautes-Pyrénées =

Aureilhan
- Commune
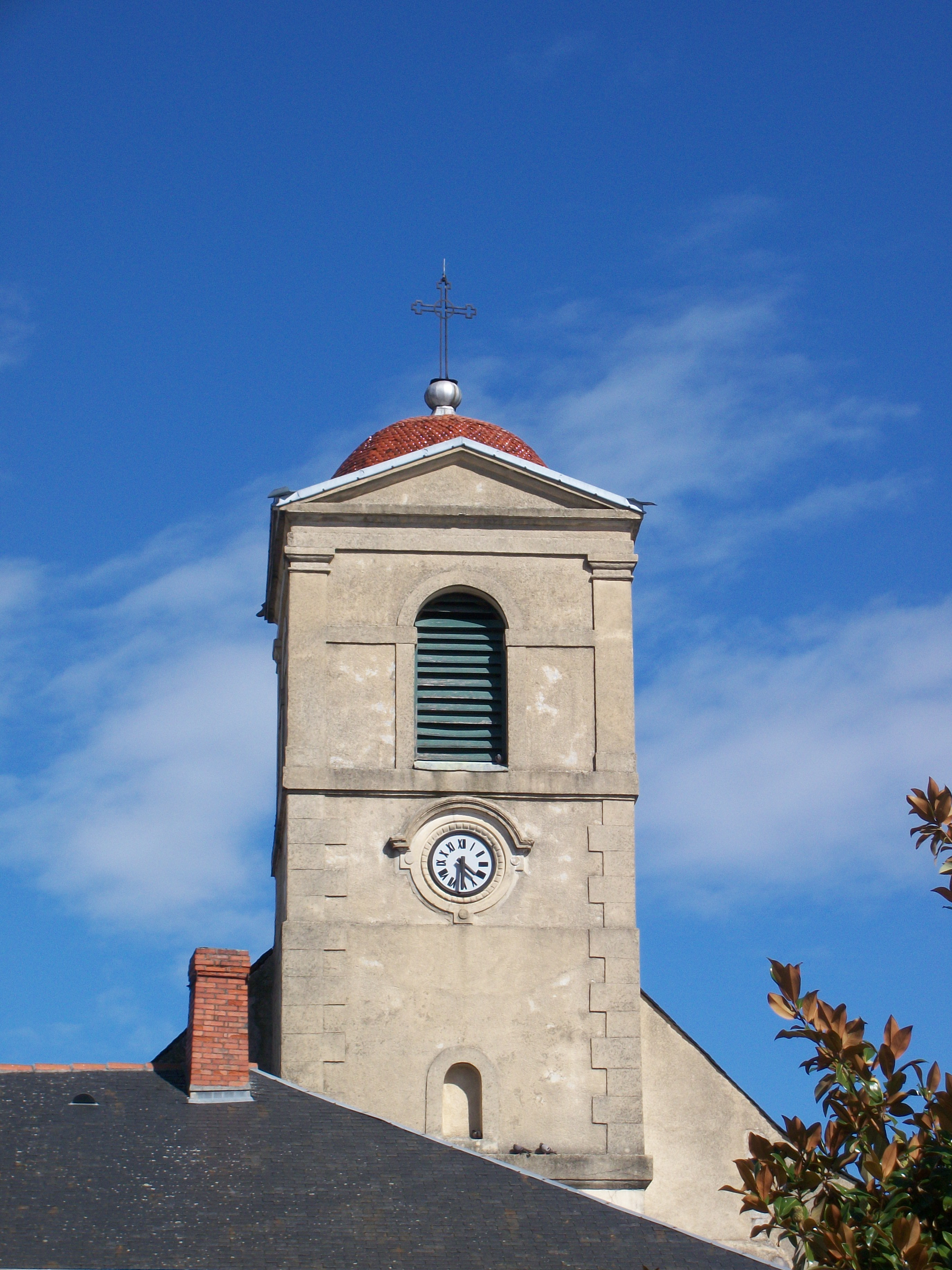
- The bell tower of the church of Saint-Guérin

- Coat of arms
- Location of Aureilhan
- Location within France Location within Occitanie
- Coordinates: 43°14′41″N 0°05′51″E
- Country: France
- Region: Occitania
- Department: Hautes-Pyrénées
- Arrondissement: Tarbes
- Canton: Aureilhan
- Intercommunality: CA Tarbes-Lourdes-Pyrénées

Government
  - Mayor (2023–2026): Emmanuel Alonso
- Area^{1}: 9.44 km^{2} (3.64 sq mi)
- Elevation: 306 m (1,004 ft)
- Highest elevation: 385 m (1,263 ft)
- Lowest elevation: 284 m (932 ft)
- Population (2023): 8,031
  - Density: 851/km^{2} (2,200/sq mi)
- Time zone: UTC+01:00 (CET)
  - Summer (DST): UTC+02:00 (CEST)
- INSEE/Postal code: 65047 /65800
- ^{1} French Land Register data, which excludes lakes, ponds, glaciers > 1 km^{2} (0.386 sq mi or 247 acres) and river estuaries.

Aureilhan (French pronunciation: [oʁɛjɑ̃]; Occitan: Aurelhan) is a commune in the Hautes-Pyrénées department in southwestern France.

== Population ==
Historical population

Year	Pop.	±% p.a.
1936	2,668	—
1946	3,939	+3.97%
1954	4,076	+0.43%
1962	5,835	+4.59%
1968	6,782	+2.54%
1975	7,895	+2.19%
1982	7,590	−0.56%

Year	Pop.	±% p.a.
1990	7,454	−0.23%
1999	7,447	−0.01%
2007	7,616	+0.28%
2012	7,992	+0.97%
2017	7,745	−0.63%
2023	8,031	+0.61%

Source: EHESS and INSEE (1968-2023)

== See also ==
- Communes of the Hautes-Pyrénées department
