= Xavier Thévenard =

French elite athlete (born 1988)

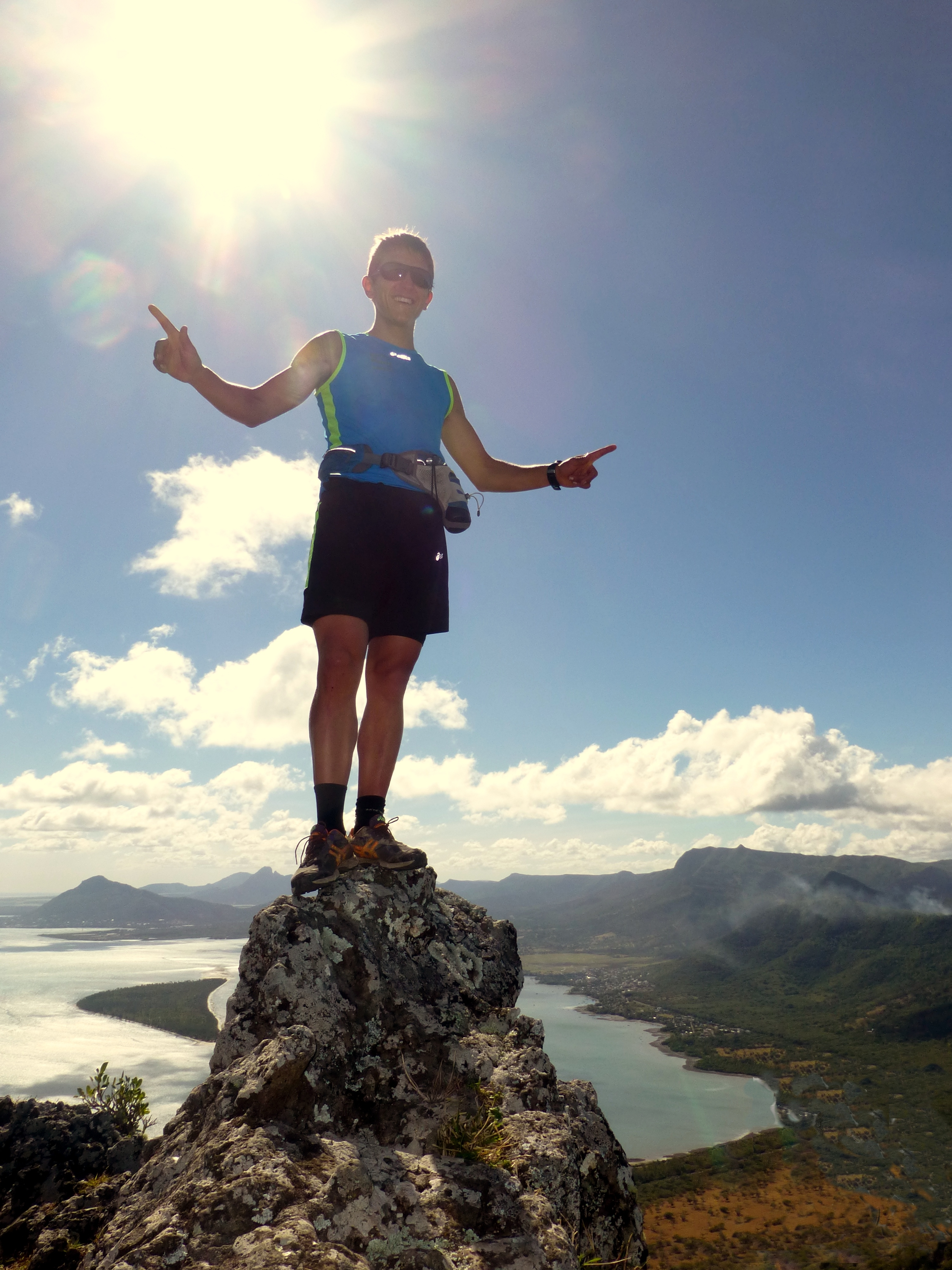
- Xavier Thévenard on the summit of Le Morne Brabant, Mauritius, slightly less than two months before winning the UTMB.

Personal information
- Nationality: French
- Born: March 6, 1988 (age 37) Nantua, France
- Height: 170 cm (5 ft 7 in)
- Weight: 62 kg (137 lb)

Xavier Thévenard is a French elite athlete who specialises in trail and mountain running. He was born on March 6, 1988 in Nantua, France. He won the Ultra-Trail du Mont-Blanc in 2013, 2015 and 2018.

== Biography ==
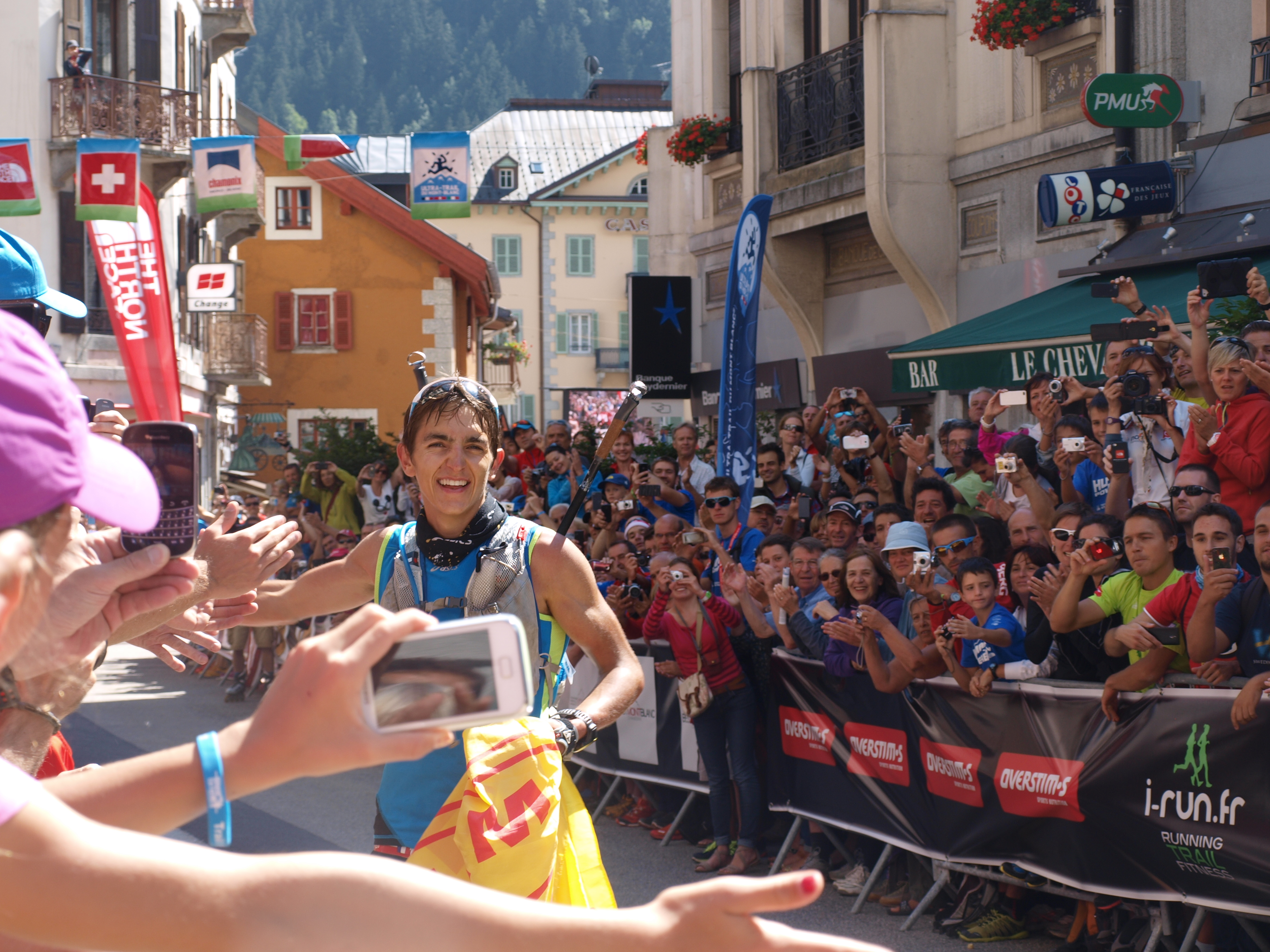
Xavier Thévenard about to cross 2013's UTMB finish line

A native of the ski resort Les Plans d'Hotonnes, and a former cross-country skier and biathlete, he started running as physical training over the summer months, before entering his first ultra running competitions in 2010.

He is the only athlete to have achieved the Ultra-Trail du Mont-Blanc Grand Slam with victories in the four individual races:

- UTMB (170 km) in 2013, 2015 and 2018
- CCC (99 km) in 2010
- TDS (119 km) in 2014
- OCC (55 km) in 2016

In 2017, he won the Mont-Blanc 80 km. In 2019, he won Ultra-Trail Mt. Fuji (UTMF) and Mont-Blanc 90 km.

== Record of achievements ==
#	Mars symbol	Race	Distance	Start	Time
2nd	2nd place, silver medalist(s)	(France) Transju'Trail	70 km	6 June 2010	06:31:15
1st	1st place, gold medalist(s)	(France) (Italy) (Switzerland) CCC	98 km	27 August 2010	11:57:13
1st	1st place, gold medalist(s)	(France) Transju'Trail (1)	70 km	5 June 2011	06:20:51
2nd	2nd place, silver medalist(s)	(France) 6000D	60 km	30 July 2011	05:48:06
3rd	3rd place, bronze medalist(s)	(France) Trail des Aiguilles Rouge	50 km	25 September 2011	06:48:29
1st	1st place, gold medalist(s)	(France) Endurance trail des Templiers	106 km	21 October 2011	10:58:44
1st	1st place, gold medalist(s)	(France) Trail des forts du Grand Besançon	45 km	12 May 2012	03:44:58
1st	1st place, gold medalist(s)	(France) Transju'trail (2)	72 km	2 June 2013	06:21:21
3rd	3rd place, bronze medalist(s)	(France) (Switzerland) 80km du Mont-Blanc	80 km	28 June 2013	10:06:28
1st	1st place, gold medalist(s)	(France) (Italy) (Switzerland) Ultra-Trail du Mont-Blanc (1)	168 km	30 August 2013	20:34:57
2nd	2nd place, silver medalist(s)	(France) Grande course des Templiers	73 km	27 October 2013	06:47:46
1st	1st place, gold medalist(s)	(France) (Italy) TDS	119 km	27 August 2014	14:10:37
1st	1st place, gold medalist(s)	(France) (Italy) (Switzerland) Ultra-Trail du Mont-Blanc (2)	170 km	28 August 2015	21:09:15
3rd	3rd place, bronze medalist(s)	(France) Transju'trail	72 km	5 June 2016	06:42:33
2nd	2nd place, silver medalist(s)	(France) (Switzerland) Marathon du Mont-Blanc	42 km	24 June 2016	4:07:51
3rd	3rd place, bronze medalist(s)	(United States) Hardrock 100	100 mi	15 July 2016	23:57:10
1st	1st place, gold medalist(s)	(France) (Switzerland) OCC	55 km	2016-08-25	5:28:37
3rd	3rd place, bronze medalist(s)	(Portugal) Ultra Trail de l'île de Madère	115 km	22 April 2017	13:42:16
1st	1st place, gold medalist(s)	(France) (Switzerland) 80km du Mont-Blanc	82 km	23 June 2017	11:03:05
4th	4th	(France) (Italy) (Switzerland) Ultra-Trail du Mont-Blanc	167 km	1 September 2017	20:03:14
1st	1st place, gold medalist(s)	(France) (Italy) (Switzerland) Ultra-Trail du Mont-Blanc (3)	171 km	1 September 2018	20:44:16
