= Séméac =

- Commune
- Location of Séméac
- Location within France Location within Occitanie
- Coordinates: 43°13′45″N 0°06′27″E
- Country: France
- Region: Occitania
- Department: Hautes-Pyrénées
- Arrondissement: Tarbes
- Canton: Aureilhan
- Intercommunality: CA Tarbes-Lourdes-Pyrénées

Government
  - Mayor (2020–2026): Philippe Baubay
- Area^{1}: 6.29 km^{2} (2.43 sq mi)
- Elevation: 321 m (1,053 ft)
- Highest elevation: 436 m (1,430 ft)
- Lowest elevation: 310 m (1,020 ft)
- Population (2023): 5,236
  - Density: 832/km^{2} (2,160/sq mi)
- Time zone: UTC+01:00 (CET)
  - Summer (DST): UTC+02:00 (CEST)
- INSEE/Postal code: 65417 /65600
- ^{1} French Land Register data, which excludes lakes, ponds, glaciers > 1 km^{2} (0.386 sq mi or 247 acres) and river estuaries.

Séméac (French pronunciation: [semeak]; Occitan: Semiac) is a commune in the Hautes-Pyrénées department in south-western France.

== Population ==
Historical population
Year	Pop.	±% p.a.
1968	5,122	—
1975	5,158	+0.10%
1982	5,012	−0.41%
1990	4,428	−1.54%
1999	4,751	+0.79%
2007	5,077	+0.83%
2012	4,632	−1.82%
2017	4,926	+1.24%
2023	5,236	+1.02%
Source: INSEE

== See also ==
- Communes of the Hautes-Pyrénées department
