= Ichinose =

Ichinose (written: 市瀬 or 市ノ瀬 or 一之瀬 or 一ノ瀬 or 一の瀬) is a Japanese surname. Notable people with the surname include:

- Hidekazu Ichinose (市瀬 秀和; born 1975), Japanese voice actor
- Kana Ichinose (市ノ瀬 加那; born 1996), Japanese voice actress
- Taizo Ichinose (一ノ瀬 泰造; 1947–1973), Japanese war photographer

== Fictional characters ==
- Chizuru Ichinose (一ノ瀬 ちづる), a character in the manga series Rent-A-Girlfriend
- Futaba Ichinose (一ノ瀬 双葉), a character in the manga series Seiyu's Life!
- Guren Ichinose (一瀬 グレン), a character in the manga series Seraph of the End
- Hajime Ichinose (一ノ瀬 はじめ), the protagonist of the anime series Gatchaman Crowds
- Hanea Ichinose (一の瀬 花枝), a character in the manga series Maison Ikkoku
- Haru Ichinose (一ノ瀬 晴), a character in the manga series Riddle Story of Devil
- Honami Ichinose (一之瀬 帆波), a character in the light novel and anime series Classroom of the Elite
- Hotaro Ichinose (一ノ瀬 宝太郎), a character in the TV series Kamen Rider Gotchard
- Kaede Ichinose (一ノ瀬 かえで), a character in the anime series Aikatsu!
- Kentaro Ichinose (一の瀬 賢太郎), a character in the manga series Maison Ikkoku
- Kotomi Ichinose (一ノ瀬 ことみ), a character in the visual novel Clannad
- Kouki Ichinose (一の瀬 後期), a character in the manga series Ore Monogatari
- Kuon Ichinose (一ノ瀬 久音), a character in the video game Persona 5 Strikers
- Maki Ichinose (一之瀬 真樹), a character in the manga series Bleach
- Minori Ichinose (一之瀬みのり), a character in the 2021 anime series Tropical-Rouge! Pretty Cure
- Narumi Ichinose (一之瀬なるみ), a character in the anime series Tropical-Rouge! Pretty Cure
- Sô Ichinose (一ノ瀬 曹), a character in the manga Doubt!!
- Tokiya Ichinose (一ノ瀬 トキヤ), a character in the visual novel series Uta no Prince-sama
- Miki Ichinose the protagonist of the teen drama series mother at fourteen
