= Hayden Hawks =

American ultramarathon runner

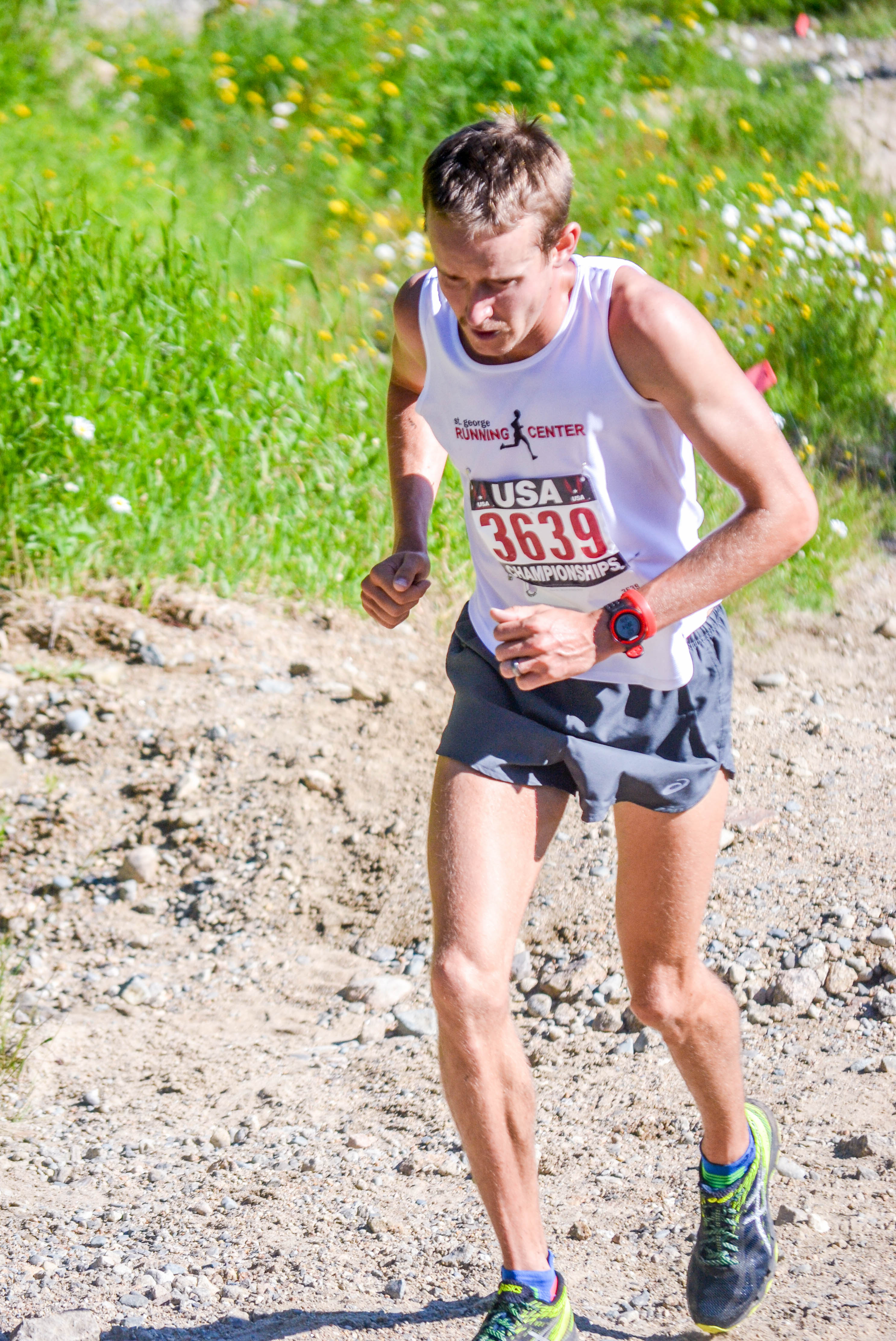
- Hawks in 2016

Personal information
- Nationality: United States
- Born: January 22, 1991 (age 35)

Sport
- Events: Ultramarathon, trail running, skyrunning
- Team: Hoka One One

Hayden Hawks (born 1991) is an American professional trail and ultramarathon runner. A St. George, Utah native, Hawks began running cross-country in high school after playing basketball. He won high school state championships in the 1600m and 3200m, and later went on to run in the Division I team at Southern Utah University. He first gained notoriety as a trail athlete with his 2016 win of the Speedgoat 50k, by the next year joining the US team at the International Association of Ultrarunners World Championships.

== Notable race results ==
Hawks has had top three finishes at a number of the most competitive trail ultramarathons in the world.

Year	Competition	Venue	Position	Event
2026	Canyons Endurance Runs by UTMB	California	3rd	100k
2025	Chiangmai Thailand by UTMB	Thailand	3rd	50k
2025	Kodiak Ultra Marathons by UTMB	California	1st	100 mile
2025	Tarawera Ultra-Trail by UTMB	Australia	1st	50k
2024	Julian Alps Trail by UTMB	Slovenia	2nd	50k
2024	Ultra-Trail du Mont-Blanc Courmayer/Champex/Chamonix (CCC)	Italy, Switzerland, France	1st	100k
2024	Western States Endurance Run	California	3rd	100 mile
2024	Black Canyon Ultras	Arizona	1st (course record)	100k
2022	Western States Endurance Run	California	2nd	100 mile
2020	JFK 50 Mile	Maryland	1st (course record)	50 mile
2019	Broken Arrow Skyrace	California	1st	46k
2017	Ultra-Trail du Mont-Blanc Courmayer/Champex/Chamonix (CCC)	Italy, Switzerland, France	1st	100k
2016	The North Face Endurance Challenge	California	2nd	50 miler
2016	Speedgoat	Utah	1st	50k
