= Zach Miller (runner) =

American ultramarathon runner (born 1988)

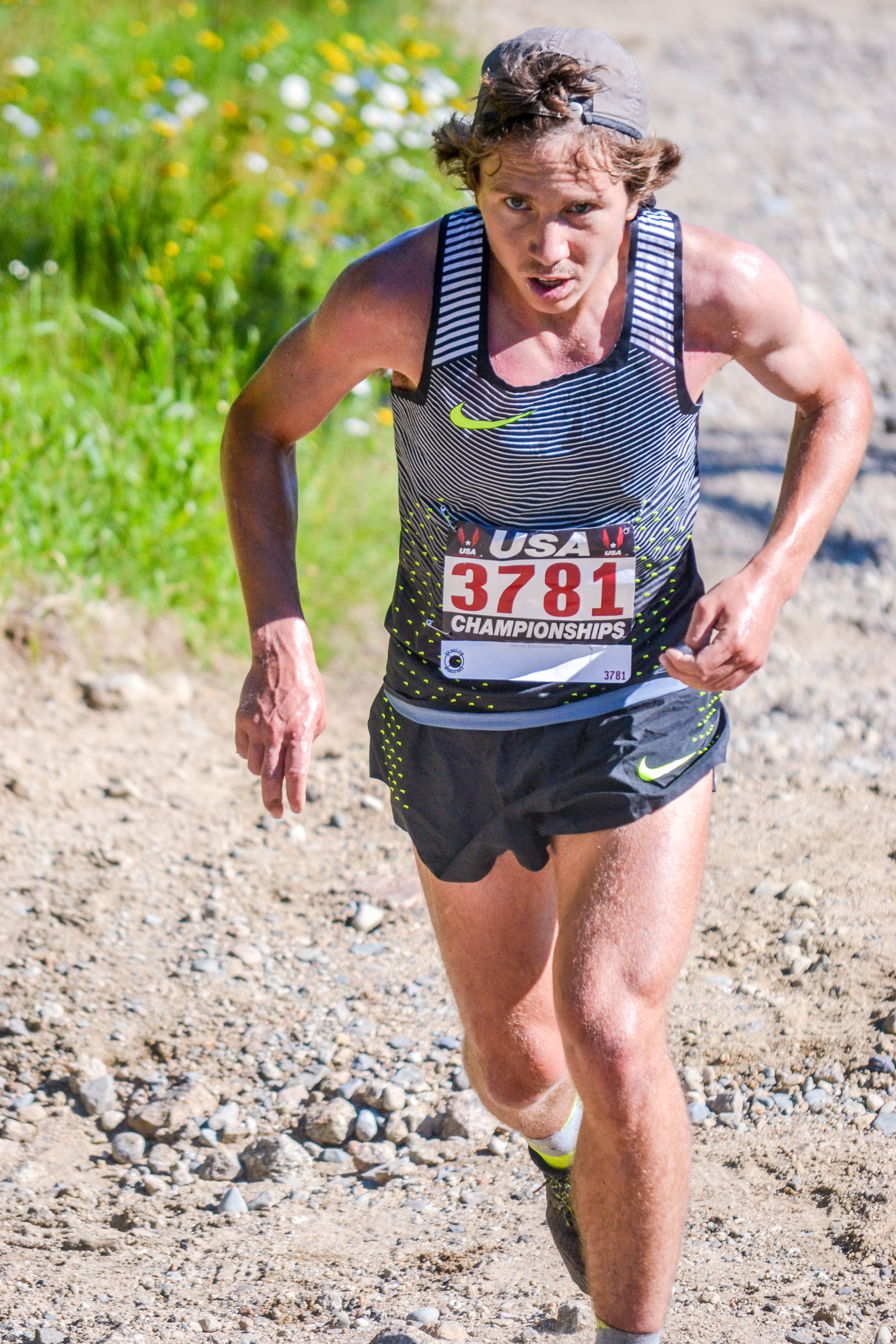
- Miller racing in 2016

Personal information
- Born: October 30, 1988 (age 38)

Sport
- Country: United States
- Events: Ultramarathon, trail running

Zach Miller is a professional American ultramarathon runner.

Born in Kenya to missionary parents, Miller was primarily raised in Lancaster County, Pennsylvania. He ran track, cross country, and played soccer in high school. He continued to run at Rochester Institute of Technology while studying electrical engineering.

After college Miller worked in the print shop on the Queen Mary 2 cruise ship, and trained for running on a treadmill, the ship's stairwells, and at ports of call. After his win of the JFK 50 Mile in 2013 with the third fastest time in course history, he turned pro while continuing his cruise ship work. In 2015, his win of Ultra-Trail du Mont-Blanc's 105 kilometres (65 mi) Courmayeur-Champex-Chamonix (CCC) was the first American win of that race.

After his cruise work Miller was the resident caretaker at Barr Camp near Manitou Springs, Colorado for five years, which provided the opportunity to live and train at altitude on the Barr Trail and nearby Pikes Peak. After Barr Camp, Miller's primary residence became a converted school bus.

After a three-year break to recover from Haglund's syndrome, Miller returned to racing in 2023. He became one of only a few American men to podium at the Ultra-Trail du Mont-Blanc 105 mile race, after coming in second to overall winner Jim Walmsley.

== Notable race results ==
Miller has won or had a top three finish at a number of the most competitive ultramarathons in the world.

Year	Competition	Venue	Position	Event
2023	Ultra-Trail du Mont-Blanc	Switzerland, Italy, France	2nd	100 mile
2023	Tarawera Ultramarathon	New Zealand	1st	100 mile
2022	Trail 100 Andorra	Andorra	1st	105k
2018	JFK 50	Maryland, USA	2nd	50 mile
2017	The North Face Endurance Challenge	Marin County, California	1st	50 mile
2016	The North Face Endurance Challenge	Marin County, California	1st	50 mile
2016	Madeira Island Ultra Trail	Madeira Island	1st	100 mile
2015	The North Face Endurance Challenge	Marin County, California	1st	50 mile
2015	Ultra-Trail du Mont-Blanc CCC	Italy, France, Switzerland	1st	100k
2014	Lake Sonoma	California	1st	50 mile
2013	JFK 50	Maryland, USA	1st	50 mile
