= Transvulcania =

Ultramarathon race held in Spain

- Date: Early May
- Location: (Spain) La Palma
- Event type: Ultramarathon trail run
- Distance: 73 km (45 mi)
- Established: 2009
- Course records: Men: David Sinclair 6:32:24 (2026); Women: Blandine L'Hirondel 7:43:47 (2026)
- Website: www.transvulcania.com

Transvulcania is a long distance race that is held annually on La Palma, one of the western Canary Islands. It is considered one of the hardest mountain-ultramarathons in the world and one of the most important in Spain. The total route has a length of 73 km (45 mi) with a cumulative elevation gain of 4,350 m (14,270 ft) and elevation loss of 4,057 m (13,310 ft). The race has taken place since 2009, with the participation of many international runners.

From 2012-2019, Transvulcania was included in the Skyrunner World Series, with the vertical kilometer included as part of the Vertical Kilometer World Circuit starting in 2017. After cancellations in 2020 and 2021, the race returned as part of was part of the UTMB World Series from 2022-2023, before ending its affiliation in order to "recover its essence." In 2024, adidas TERREX became the lead sponsor of the event, which was rebranded as Transvulcania adidas TERREX La Palma Island.

Over time, additional races have been added to the original Transvulcania ultramarathon. As of 2025, they include:

- Transvulcania Ultramarathon, approximately 73 km (45 mi) with 4,350 m (14,270 ft) of elevation gain and 4,057 m (13,310 ft) of elevation loss (previously known as "Volcanes")
- Transvulcania Marathon, approximately 43 km (27 mi) with 1,884 m (6,181 ft) of elevation gain and 3,329 m (10,922 ft) of elevation loss
- Transvulcania Half Marathon, approximately 25 km (16 mi) with 2,097 m (6,880 ft) of elevation gain and 689 m (2,660 ft) of elevation loss (previously known as "El Roque")
- Transvulcania Vertical Kilometer, approximately 7 km (4 mi) with 1,160 m (3,806 ft) of elevation gain (previously known as the "Vertical Challenge")
- Transvulcania Joëlette, approximately 8 km (5 mi) with 1,048 m (3,438 ft) of elevation change, introduced in 2025 to include athletes with disabilities and allow the use of mountain-adapted wheelchairs
- Transvulcania Kids-Junior, a collection of youth races ranging in distance from 250 m (820 ft) to 4,500 m (~2.8 mi) depending on age category

== Winners ==
Course records with green background.

Year	Country	Man	Time	Country	Woman	Time
2009	Spain	Salvador Calvo Redondo	9:00:36	Spain	Marta Prat Llorens	13:37:51
2010	Spain	Miguel Heras Hernández	8:09:32	Spain	Nerea Martínez	10:53:33
2011	Spain	Miguel Heras Hernández	7:32:11	Spain	Mónica Aguilera	10:00:03
2012	United States	Dakota Jones	6:59:07	New Zealand	Anna Frost	8:11:31
2013	Spain	Kílian Jornet	6:54:09	Sweden	Emelie Forsberg	8:13:22
2014	Spain	Luis Alberto Hernando	6:55:41	New Zealand	Anna Frost	8:10:41
2015	Spain	Luis Alberto Hernando	6:52:39	Sweden	Emelie Forsberg	8:32:59
2016	Spain	Luis Alberto Hernando	7:04:44	Sweden	Ida Nilsson	8:14:18
2017	United States	Tim Freriks	7:02:03	Sweden	Ida Nilsson	8:04:16
2018	Spain	Pere Aurell Bové	7:37:26	Sweden	Ida Nilsson	8:40:43
2019	France	Thibaut Garrivier	7:11:04	Netherlands	Ragna Debats	8:09:25
2020	cancelled due to coronavirus pandemic					
2021	cancelled due to volcanic eruption					
2022	Sweden	Petter Engdahl	7:10:29	United States	Abby Hall	8:29:10
2023	United States	Dakota Jones	7:02:16	Italy	Martina Valmassoi	9:09:13
2024	United Kingdom	Jonathan Albon	7:03:10	New Zealand	Ruth Croft	8:02:49
2025	Slovakia	Peter Fraňo	6:55:36	France	Anne-Lise Rousset	8:18:17
2026	United States	David Sinclair	6:32:24	France	Blandine L'Hirondel	7:43:47
