= Lizzy Hawker =

British endurance athlete (born 1976)

Elizabeth Hawker
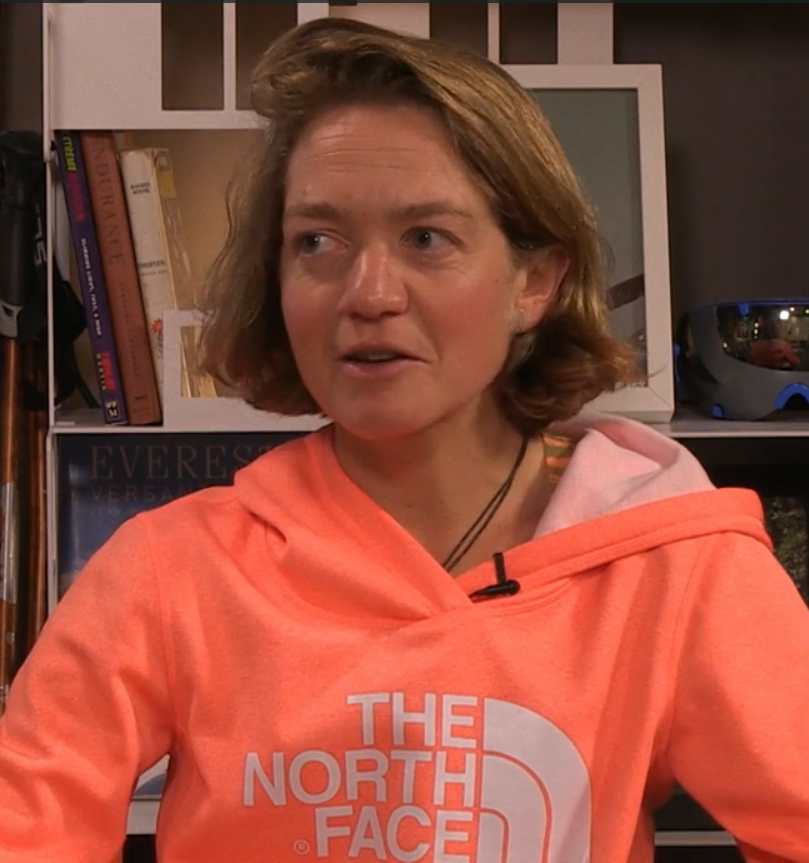

Personal information
- Nationality: British
- Born: 10 March 1976 (age 50)
- Years active: 2005–present
- Website: lizzyhawker.com

Sport
- Country: United Kingdom
- Sport: Running
Medal record
Ultramarathon
Representing United Kingdom
IAU 100 km World Championships
Gold medal – first place	2006 Misari Regatta	100 km
Bronze medal – third place	2010 Gibraltar	100 km
- Updated on 2 May 2015

Elizabeth Hawker (born 10 March 1976) is a British endurance athlete. Her career highlights include five wins at the Ultra-Trail du Mont-Blanc (UTMB), as well as the 2006 IAU 100 km World Championships. She is a former world record-holder at the 24 hour distance. She has also worked as an oceanographer and climate change researcher.

== Early life ==
Hawker grew up in Upminster, a suburb of London. She stated that she first fell for mountains when visiting Zermatt in the Swiss Alps at the age of six.

== Career ==
Hawker ran her first long-distance race at the London Marathon in 2000.

Hawker first ran the Ultra-Trail du Mont-Blanc (UTMB) in 2005. Although she had never owned a pair of trail-running shoes until 10 days before the race she won it at her first attempt. She has won UTMB record five times, a record for either male or female runners.

The North Face began sponsoring Hawker in 2005. She continued to work as a researcher for the British Antarctic Survey until 2007, when she relocated to the Laufschule Scuol, a training centre in the Swiss Alps. Hawker won the 2006 IAU 100km World Championships, and in 2007 set the record for running the 199 miles between Mount Everest South Base Camp and Kathmandu, Nepal, in 77 hours 36 minutes.

The 2010 IAU 100 km World Championships saw Hawker lead the way for most of the race, battling with her compatriot Ellie Greenwood but she faded towards the end to take bronze behind Greenwood and Monica Carlin of Italy. This also earned her a bronze in the jointly hosted IAU 100 km European Championships. In 2011, she set the women's 24-hour world record with 153.5 miles in Llandudno, Wales. She also improved on her Everest record with a time of 71 hours 25 minutes. The following year Hawker won UTMB, the 100-mile Run Rabbit Run in Colorado, and the 155-mile Spartathlon while setting a new women's record and placing third overall.

She beat her Everest Base Camp–Kathmandu time in 2013, completing the distance in 63 hours.

Hawker says that she has suffered few injuries in her career, except in the two years up to 2015, when she suffered six stress fractures. She has a reputation for recovering quickly after major races.

While training for the UTMB, Hawker ran along the footpath of the Tour de Monte Rosa many times. This experience led her to create a new race, the Ultra Tour Monte Rosa, which runs for 93 miles from Grächen to Zermatt, on through villages in Italy, before returning to the start point. It incorporates more than 32,000 feet of ascent and descent over technical terrain. The inaugural "Zero Edition" took place in August 2015.

Hawker ran, hiked and climbed 1,600 km across the Himalayas in Nepal in 2016.

She is the author of the book Runner: A short story about a long run.

== Personal life ==
Hawker completed her PhD in physical oceanography from Southampton University in 2005. She has worked for the British Antarctic Survey, studying climate change along the Antarctic coastline. As of 2013, she lived in Switzerland.

Hawker has been a strict vegetarian since five years old.

== See also ==
- List of Mount Everest records
