= Marathon du Mont Blanc =

Marathon distance alpine trail running event

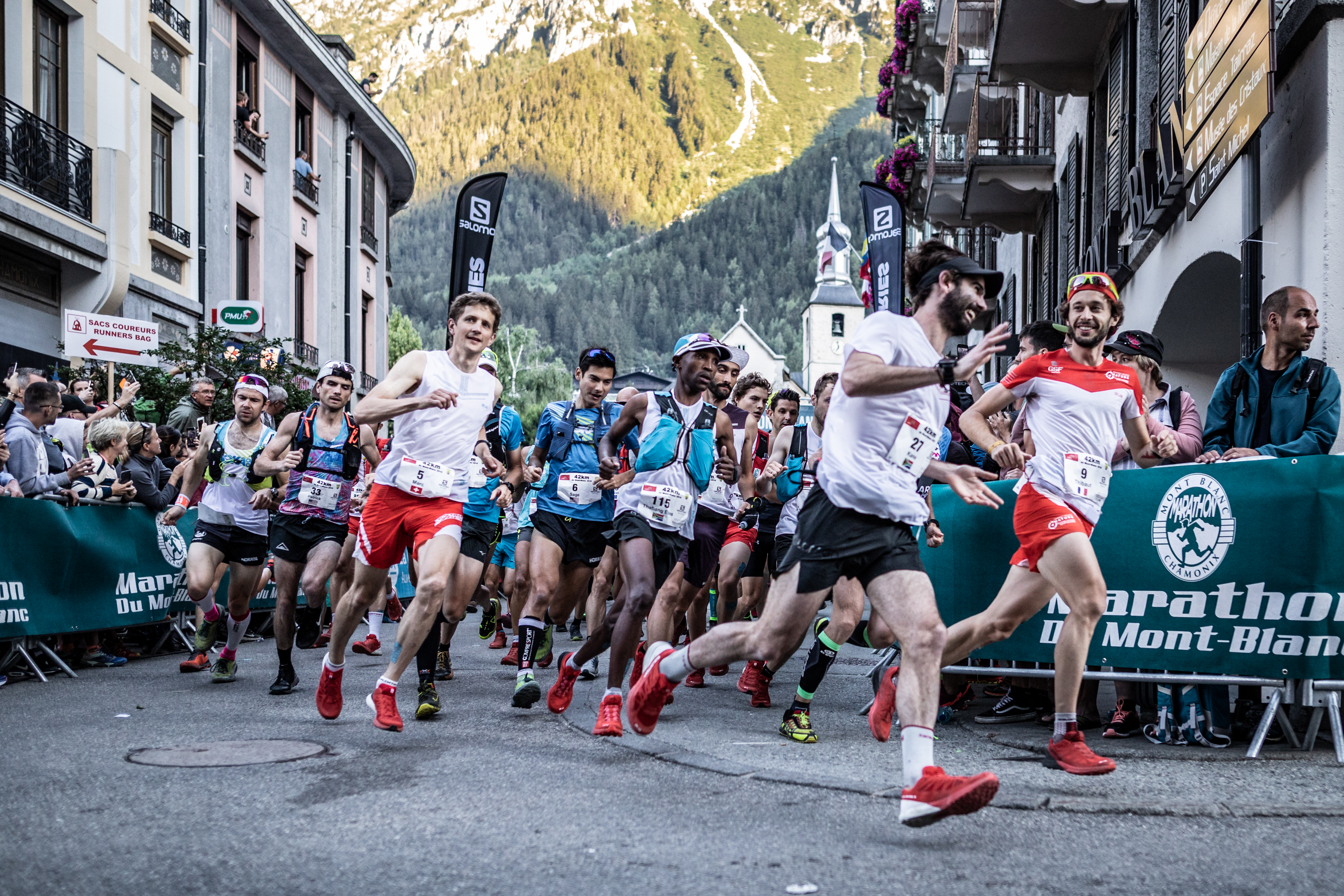
- Date: June
- Location: (France) Chamonix
- Event type: SkyMarathon
- Distance: 42 km / 2,730 m
- Established: 2003
- Website: Marathon du Mont Blanc

The Marathon du Mont Blanc (Mont Blanc Marathon) is an annual marathon distance (42.195 km) alpine trail running event held in Chamonix, France. The Marathon du Mont Blanc race is the titular event but the name also refers to the group of longer and shorter distance races one or more of which competitors can compete in over a three-day period starting on the last Friday in June.

The marathon was first run in June 2003, however the shorter distance 23 km du Mont-Blanc, which utilizes part of the same route as the marathon, has been run annually since 1979.

== Overview ==
The 23 km du Mont-Blanc (formerly the "Cross du Mont-Blanc") was founded by Georges Costaz, the President of the Club alpin français Chamonix (CAF) in 1979. In 2003, on the 25th anniversary of the first running, the Marathon du Mont Blanc event was added to the race schedule. The following year the 10 km du Mont-Blanc event was added and in 2011 the KM Vertical (3.8 km) was also included. In order to meet the requirements for hosting the Skyrunning World Championships in 2014 the 80 km du Mont-Blanc was added to the race schedule as a test event in 2013 (90 km since 2018). The event also offers the "Mini Cross" (800 m to 3 km) for 7 to 15-year-old competitors.

The race is currently administered by Club des sports de Chamonix.

== Races ==
=== KM Vertical du Mont-Blanc ===
Distance: 3.8 km
Total Ascent: 1,000 m
Start Time: 14:00
Course cut-off: N/A
Number of entries: Unknown

=== 10 km du Mont-Blanc ===
Distance: 10 km
Total Ascent: 325 m
Start Time: 13:00
Course cut-off: Unknown
Number of entries: 1,500

=== 23 km du Mont-Blanc ===
Distance: 23 km
Total Ascent: 1,665 m
Start Time: 08:00
Course cut-off: 5 hours
Number of entries: 1,000

=== Marathon du Mont-Blanc ===
Distance: 42 km
Total Ascent: 2,730 m
Start Time: 07:00
Course cut-off: 9 hours
Number of entries: 2,000

=== 90 km du Mont-Blanc ===
Distance: 92 km (2023)
Total Ascent: 6,330 m
Start Time: 04:00
Course cut-off: 24 hours
Number of entries: 1,000
Course Description: Starting on the Place de l'Église in Central Chamonix the route climbs via Refuge de Bel Lachat to Le Brévent (2,525 m), the runners then descend to Plan Praz. From Plan Praz the course traverses the Aiguilles Rouges to La Flégère and via Lac des Chéserys and Col de Montets to Le Buet (1,330 m).
From Buet the trail climbs around 1,300m to the Col du Corbeau (2,602 m) and then descends via Col du Passet and Chalets de la Loriaz to Vallorcine (1,260 m).
From Vallorcine the route climbs steeply via Col des Posettes to Aiguillette des Posettes (2,201 m) before descending just as steeply via Le Tour and Argentière to Les Bois (1,083 m).
The trail then makes the last major ascent via Les Mottets and Gare du Montenvers to Signal (2,200 m) where the runners traverse to Refuge du plan de l’aiguille (also 2,200 m) before descending to the finish in Chamonix.

=== Duo étoilé ===
Distance: 21 km (2023)
Total Ascent: 1,450 m
Start Time: 19:30
Course cut-off: 6:00 hours
Course Description: Starting from the center of Chamonix, the first kilometers will lead you to the Arveyron before taking the path of the crystalliers to join the Planards and the path leading to the alpine pastures of Blaitière. From there you will continue in direction of the refuge of the Plan of the Aiguille (2,207 m) before descending on Chamonix by the same way as the 90 km of the Mont Blanc.

== Results ==
The winners of the Mont Blanc Marathon have been as follows.

Year	Men	Time	Women	Time
2003	(France) Éric Lacroix	3:21:04	(France) Evelyne Mura	4:04:43
2004	(Italy) Silvio Mannino	3:44:20	(France) Corinne Favre	4:22:02
2005	(France) Pascal Giguet	3:34:05	(Ukraine) Mariya Ostrovska	4:38:49
2006	(United Kingdom) Nick Sharp	3:35:45	(France) Liliane Cleret	4:43:35
2007	(United Kingdom) Nick Sharp	3:27:26	(France) Carole Toigo	4:31:06
2008	(Switzerland) Jean-Yves Rey	3:52:41	(France) Christiane Lacombe	5:16:04
2009	(France) Christophe Assailly	4:03:23	(France) Maud Giraud	4:54:02
2010	(France) Nicolas Pianet	3:56:57	(France) Maud Giraud	4:41:40
2011	(France) Nicolas Pianet	3:56:42	(Andorra) Stéphanie Jiménez	4:39:36
2012	(Spain) Kilian Jornet	3:38:24	(Switzerland) Maude Mathys	4:28:17
2013	(Spain) Kilian Jornet	3:30:41	(United States) Stevie Kremer	4:03:16
2014	(Spain) Kilian Jornet	3:23:39	(Italy) Elisa Desco	3:53:33
2015	(Switzerland) Marc Lauenstein	3:48:35	(Italy) Elisa Desco	4:35:10
2016	(France) Cedric Fleureton	4:04:23	(Sweden) Ida Nilsson	4:46:18
2017	(Spain) Kilian Jornet	3:45:45	(United States) Megan Kimmel	4:40:36
2018	(Spain) Kilian Jornet	3:54:54	(New Zealand) Ruth Croft	4:37:30
2019	(Italy) Davide Magnini	3:47:13	(New Zealand) Ruth Croft	4:34:44
2020	Cancelled due to the COVID-19 pandemic			
2021	(Norway) Stian Angermund	3:18:08	(Switzerland) Maude Mathys	3:51:04
2022	(United Kingdom) Jonathan Albon	3:35:20	(Spain) Sara Alonso	4:14:49
2023	(Switzerland) Rémi Bonnet	3:35:04	(United States) Sophia Laukli	4:12:39
2024	(Morocco) Elhousine Elazzaoui	3:30:10	(Switzerland) Judith Wyder	4:11:12
2025	(Italy) Davide Magnini	3:42:55	(Kenya) Joyline Chepngeno	4:15:20
2026	(Switzerland) Rémi Bonnet	3:33:14	(Sweden) Tove Alexandersson	3:55:07

== See also ==
- Trail running
- Ultramarathon
- Ultra-Trail du Mont-Blanc
