= Soues, Hautes-Pyrénées =

Soues
- Commune
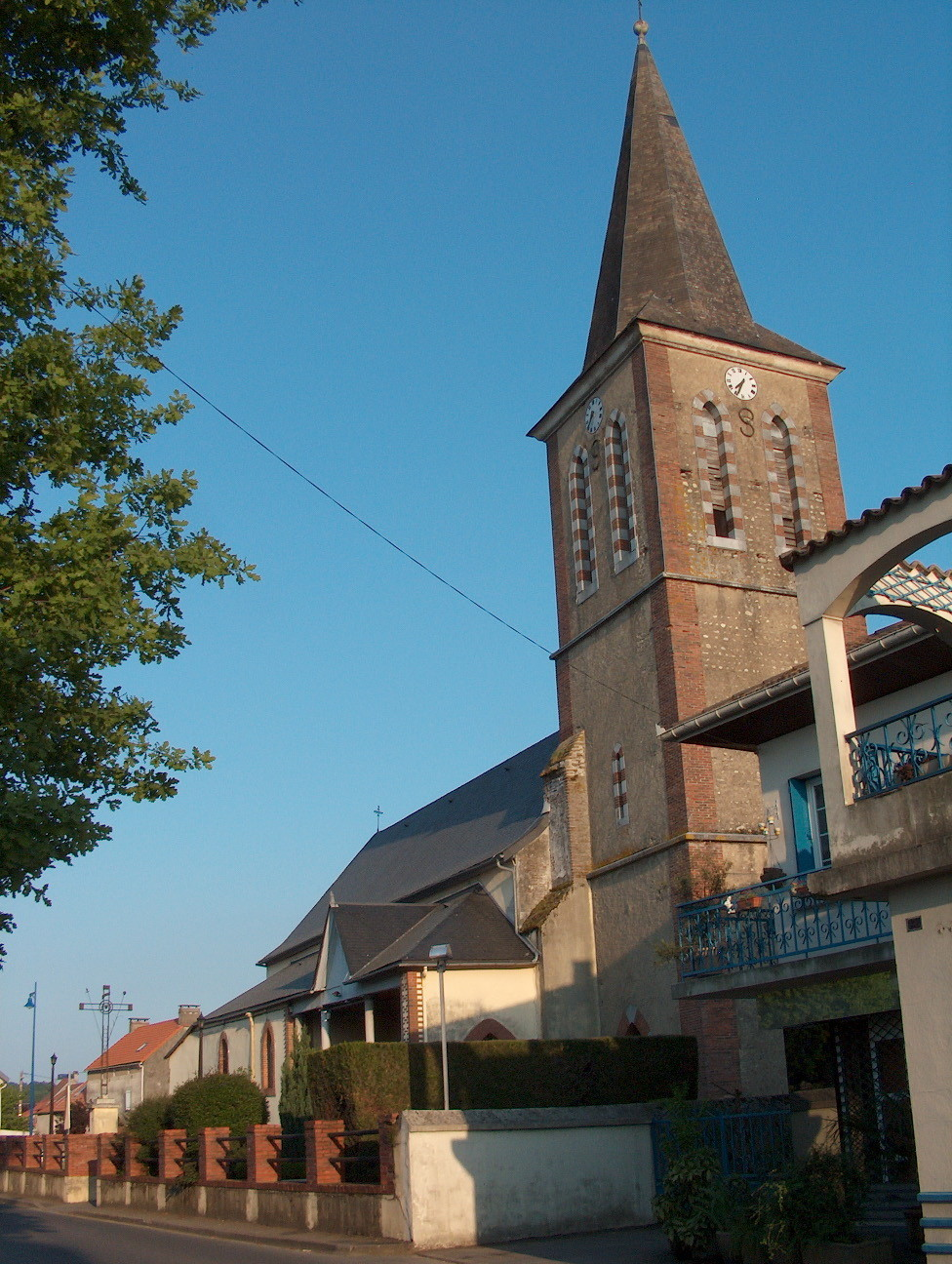
- The church of Soues

- Coat of arms
- Location of Soues
- Location within France Location within Occitanie
- Coordinates: 43°12′22″N 0°06′00″E
- Country: France
- Region: Occitania
- Department: Hautes-Pyrénées
- Arrondissement: Tarbes
- Canton: Aureilhan
- Intercommunality: CA Tarbes-Lourdes-Pyrénées

Government
  - Mayor (2020–2026): Roger Lescoute
- Area^{1}: 3.9 km^{2} (1.5 sq mi)
- Elevation: 345 m (1,132 ft)
- Highest elevation: 358 m (1,175 ft)
- Lowest elevation: 319 m (1,047 ft)
- Population (2023): 2,988
  - Density: 770/km^{2} (2,000/sq mi)
- Time zone: UTC+01:00 (CET)
  - Summer (DST): UTC+02:00 (CEST)
- INSEE/Postal code: 65433 /65430
- ^{1} French Land Register data, which excludes lakes, ponds, glaciers > 1 km^{2} (0.386 sq mi or 247 acres) and river estuaries.

Soues (French pronunciation: [sus]; Occitan: Soas) is a commune in the Hautes-Pyrénées department in south-western France.

== Population ==
Historical population
Year	Pop.	±% p.a.
1968	1,720	—
1975	2,238	+3.83%
1982	2,929	+3.92%
1990	3,179	+1.03%
1999	3,054	−0.44%
2007	2,999	−0.23%
2012	3,005	+0.04%
2017	3,061	+0.37%
2023	2,988	−0.40%
Source: INSEE

== See also ==
- Communes of the Hautes-Pyrénées department
