= Tom Evans (runner) =

British long-distance runner

Personal information
- Born: 3 February 1992 (age 34)
- Spouse: Sophie Coldwell

Sport
- Country: United Kingdom
- Sport: Athletics
- Events: Long-distance running, Ultramarathon, Trail running

Tom Evans (born 3 February 1992) is a British long-distance, trail and ultramarathon runner. A former British Army captain, he is best known for winning the Western States Endurance Run in 2023 and the Ultra-Trail du Mont-Blanc in 2025. He also won the CCC race at the Ultra-Trail du Mont-Blanc festival in 2018 and won an individual bronze medal at the 2018 Trail World Championships.

== Early life and military career ==
Evans grew up in Sussex and was active in sport from a young age, running in national school competitions and playing rugby. At 18 he joined the British Army and trained at the Royal Military Academy Sandhurst. He later served as an officer in the Welsh Guards.

During a ten-month Army posting to Kenya in 2015, Evans returned to regular running while training in a country associated with elite distance running. His military background became a recurring part of his public profile, especially after his salute at the finish of major races such as Western States and UTMB.

== Running career ==
=== Breakthrough in ultrarunning ===
Evans first gained international attention in 2017 at the Marathon des Sables, a multi-stage desert ultramarathon in Morocco. He entered the race after a bet with friends and finished third overall in 19:49:33, becoming one of the leading European performers in the race's history. Later in 2017 he finished fourth in the CCC race at the UTMB festival.

In 2018, Evans won The Coastal Challenge in Costa Rica and the South Downs Way 50 before taking individual bronze at the Trail World Championships in Penyagolosa, Spain. Great Britain also won team silver in the men's competition. Later that year he won the CCC in 10:44:32, passing the leaders late in the race.

=== Western States and international success ===
Evans made his 100-mile debut at the 2019 Western States Endurance Run, finishing third in 14:59:44. The performance was widely reported as the fastest overseas time at Western States at the time and placed him among the fastest finishers in race history.

In 2020, he won the Tarawera Ultramarathon in New Zealand in 8:03:29, setting a course record. He also competed in the men's race at the 2020 World Athletics Half Marathon Championships in Gdynia, Poland.

Evans underwent knee surgery in 2021 and returned to major international racing in 2022. In 2022 he won the Advanced race at Transgrancanaria, the MIUT 85 in Madeira, and the Scafell Sky Race, then finished third at the Ultra-Trail du Mont-Blanc in 20:34:35.

In 2023, Evans finished second at the Black Canyon 100K and won Ultra-Trail Snowdonia 50K. In June he returned to Western States and won the race in 14:40:22. iRunFar described the victory as an improvement on his third-place finish in 2019, while Trail Runner highlighted his detailed, data-led preparation for the race.

=== UTMB victory ===
Evans placed second at Lavaredo Ultra Trail and third at Transvulcania in 2024, then recorded three major victories in 2025 before the UTMB: Arc of Attrition 50, Tenerife Bluetrail 110K and the UTMB itself. At the 2025 UTMB, Evans took the lead after Arnouvaz and won in 19:18:58. BBC Sport reported that he became the first British man to win UTMB since Jez Bragg in 2010 and the first Briton to win the race since Lizzy Hawker's series of women's victories from 2005 to 2012. Runner's World noted that the win followed his 2018 CCC title and his 2023 Western States victory.

== Training ==
Evans has been associated with a highly structured approach to ultramarathon preparation. Wired reported that, at peak training volume, he ran 160–190 km per week and trained up to 30 hours weekly, combining running with weights, cross-training, physiotherapy, mobility work, biomechanical analysis and nutrition support. His preparation for Western States included heat adaptation, detailed course study and race-specific equipment choices.

== Personal life ==
Evans is married to British triathlete Sophie Coldwell. Coldwell won a Commonwealth Games gold medal in the mixed relay triathlon and later moved into trail running. She and Evans have a daughter, Phoebe, who was present with Coldwell at the finish of Evans's 2025 UTMB victory.

== Selected results ==
Year	Race	Location	Distance	Position	Time	Notes
2017	Marathon des Sables	Morocco	250 km, 6 stages	3rd	19:49:33	International breakthrough
2017	CCC	Italy, Switzerland and France	101 km	4th	10:57:44	UTMB festival
2018	The Coastal Challenge	Costa Rica	236 km, 6 stages	1st	21:44:12	Stage race victory
2018	South Downs Way 50	United Kingdom	50 mi	1st	5:44:22	
2018	Trail World Championships	Penyagolosa, Spain	85 km	3rd	8:49:35	Individual bronze; Great Britain team silver
2018	CCC	Italy, Switzerland and France	100 km	1st	10:44:32	UTMB festival race
2019	Lake Sonoma 50	United States	50 mi	3rd	6:16:28	
2019	Western States Endurance Run	United States	100 mi	3rd	14:59:44	First 100-mile race; fastest overseas time at the event at the time
2020	Tarawera Ultramarathon	New Zealand	102 km	1st	8:03:29	Course record
2022	Transgrancanaria Advanced	Spain	65 km	1st	5:10:39	
2022	MIUT 85	Madeira, Portugal	85 km	1st	8:46:35	
2022	Scafell Sky Race	United Kingdom	40 km	1st	4:30:54	
2022	Ultra-Trail du Mont-Blanc	France, Italy and Switzerland	170 km	3rd	20:34:35	First UTMB podium
2023	Black Canyon 100K	United States	100 km	2nd	7:37:40	
2023	Ultra-Trail Snowdonia 50K	United Kingdom	55 km	1st	5:27:11	
2023	Western States Endurance Run	United States	100 mi	1st	14:40:22	Race winner
2024	Transvulcania	La Palma, Spain	73 km	3rd	7:05:17	
2024	Lavaredo Ultra Trail	Italy	120 km	2nd	12:00:45	
2025	Arc of Attrition 50	United Kingdom	80 km	1st	6:54:40	
2025	Tenerife Bluetrail 110K	Tenerife, Spain	110 km	1st	12:32:20	
2025	Ultra-Trail du Mont-Blanc	France, Italy and Switzerland	174 km	1st	19:18:58	First British male winner since 2010
2026	Three Peaks Race	United Kingdom	39 km	1st	3:02:17	
