= Ruth Croft =

New Zealand ultramarathon runner

Personal information
- Born: 15 January 1989 (age 37) Greymouth, New Zealand

Sport
- Country: New Zealand
- Events: Ultramarathon, trail running
Medal record
Women's athletics
Representing New Zealand
Trail World Championships
Silver medal – second place	2019 Miranda Do Corvo	Individual

Ruth Charlotte Croft (born 15 January 1989) is a New Zealand ultramarathon and trail runner. Croft was the silver medalist at the 2019 Trail World Championships. Her victories at major international races include the Tarawera Ultramarathon, Western States, Ultra Trail Cape Town, and Ultra-Trail du Mont-Blanc World Series Final.

== Early life ==
Born on 15 January 1989 in Greymouth, on the West Coast of New Zealand's South Island, Croft grew up in the small town of Stillwater. She attended Rangi Ruru Girls' School in Christchurch, where she ran track and cross country. As a junior, she was the under-20 national champion and competed for New Zealand at the 2006 World Junior Championships in Athletics in the 3000 metres steeplechase. She also competed as a junior at both the 2005 and 2007 World Mountain Running Championships and the 2008 World Cross Country Championships in Holyrood Park, Edinburgh where she finished 57th.

After finishing high school, Croft briefly enrolled at Lincoln University near Christchurch but returned home to the West Coast to work instead. She moved to the United States after receiving an athletic scholarship to run for the University of Portland in Oregon. After graduating from Portland, Croft moved to Taiwan to teach English. She lived there for five-and-a-half years, eventually moving to a job working in marketing for the technology company Garmin.

== Running ==
Croft began competing in more trail races while living in Taiwan, and eventually became a sponsored athlete with Garmin. She won the Mt. Kinabalu International Climbathon 50k in Malaysia in 2013 and 2014. In 2015 she made her 100km debut at the Tarawera Ultra trail race in Rotorua, New Zealand finishing second and under the previous course record. She went on to win the 100-km CCC event at UTMB in 2015 and followed that with a fourth-place finish at the highly competitive North Face 50 in San Francisco, California. She moved away from Taiwan in 2017, splitting her time between Europe and New Zealand.

In 2017, Croft won the Translatlantau 50K in Hong Kong, the 62-km event at Tarawera in New Zealand, and the 73-km Les Templiers event in Millau, France. She returned to Tarawera in 2021, winning the 100-km event in a course record time of 9:21:03. She won Tarawera again in 2024. She won the 55-km OCC in Chamonix in both 2018 and 2019. At the 2019 Trail World Championships in Miranda do Corvo, Portugal, Croft won the silver medal behind Blandine L'Hirondel of France. It was the first medal for a New Zealand athlete in trail world championship history.

Croft competed in her first 100-mile race at Western States in 2021, having a successful debut in finishing second behind English runner Beth Pascall. She returned the next year to win Western States in a time of 17:21:30.

Croft won the 100-km Ultra Trail Cape Town in South Africa in November 2023. She was scheduled to run UTMB in 2023, but came down with a virus days before the race and did not start. She returned to UTMB in 2024, finishing second behind Katie Schide. In February 2025, Croft defended her title at the Tarawera Ultramarathon (her third win overall) and set a new course record. In 2025, she won the UTMB, making her the first female and only second person to win OCC, CCC and UTMB.

=== Non-racing ===
Croft ran the length of the 125-mile Arctic Circle Trail in Greenland in 2022. In 2023, she ran the historic Nakasendo Trail in Japan along with Tim Tollefson and Olympians Magda Boulet and Desiree Linden.

=== Major race wins ===
Year	Race	Location	Distance / category	Time	Notes	Ref.
2013	Mt. Kinabalu International Climbathon	Sabah, Malaysia	50 km	—	First major international mountain-running win	
2014	Mt. Kinabalu International Climbathon	Sabah, Malaysia	50 km	—	Second consecutive win	
2015	CCC, Ultra-Trail du Mont-Blanc	Chamonix, France	100 km	—	UTMB Mont-Blanc race win	
2017	Translantau	Hong Kong	50 km	—	International trail win while based in Asia	
2017	Tarawera Ultramarathon	Rotorua, New Zealand	62 km	—	Early major New Zealand trail win	
2017	Les Templiers	Millau, France	73 km	—	Major European trail win	
2018	OCC, Ultra-Trail du Mont-Blanc	Chamonix, France	55 km	—	First OCC win	
2019	OCC, Ultra-Trail du Mont-Blanc	Chamonix, France	55 km	—	Second consecutive OCC win	
2021	Tarawera Ultramarathon	Rotorua, New Zealand	100 km	9:21:03	Course record	
2022	Western States Endurance Run	Olympic Valley to Auburn, California, United States	100 miles	17:21:30	First 100-mile race win	
2023	Ultra-Trail Cape Town	Cape Town, South Africa	100 km	12:12:20	Major international 100 km win	
2024	Tarawera Ultra-Trail by UTMB	Rotorua, New Zealand	102 km	9:14:14	Second Tarawera 100 km-class win	
2024	Transvulcania	La Palma, Spain	73 km	8:02:49	Major Canary Islands trail win	
2024	Zugspitz Leutasch Trail	Austria	70 km	6:49:22	Alpine trail win	
2025	Tarawera Ultra-Trail by UTMB	Rotorua, New Zealand	102 km	8:24:31	Defended title and set a course record	
2025	UTMB	Chamonix, France	100M	22:56:23	First woman to win CCC, OCC and UTMB	
2025	Ultra-Trail Ninghai by UTMB	Ninghai, China	60 km	5:51:49	UTMB World Series win in China	
2026	Tarawera Ultra-Trail by UTMB	Rotorua, New Zealand	102 km	8:41:11	Third straight Tarawera 102 km win	

== Personal life ==
As of 2021, Croft was studying for a career in naturopathy.
