= Blandine L'Hirondel =

French trail runner and physician (born 1991)

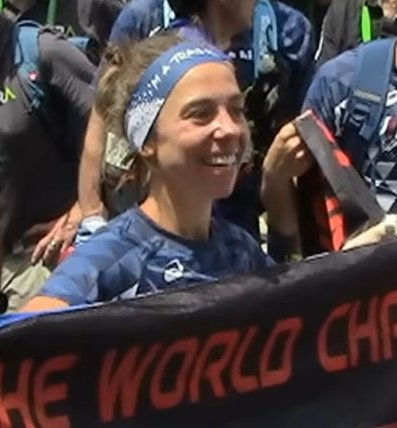

Personal information
- Born: 3 March 1991 (age 35) Caen, France
- Occupation: Obstetrician-gynaecologist

Sport
- Country: France
- Sport: Trail running, mountain running, ultramarathon
Medal record
Representing France
Women's trail and mountain running
Trail World Championships
Gold medal – first place	2019 Miranda do Corvo	Individual
Gold medal – first place	2019 Miranda do Corvo	Team
World Long Distance Mountain Running Championships
Bronze medal – third place	2019 Villa La Angostura	Individual
World Mountain and Trail Running Championships
Gold medal – first place	2022 Chiang Mai	Long trail
Gold medal – first place	2022 Chiang Mai	Long trail team
European Off-Road Running Championships
Gold medal – first place	2022 El Paso	Trail
Gold medal – first place	2022 El Paso	Trail team
Silver medal – second place	2024 Annecy	Trail
Gold medal – first place	2024 Annecy	Trail team

Blandine L'Hirondel (born 3 March 1991) is a French trail runner, ultramarathon runner and obstetrician-gynaecologist.

At UTMB Mont-Blanc, she won the OCC in 2021, the CCC in 2022 and the Ultra-Trail du Mont-Blanc in 2026. She became the second woman, after Ruth Croft, to win all three races.

She has also won the Diagonale des Fous and Transvulcania.

== Running career ==
L'Hirondel was born in Caen and grew up in Normandy. She began mountain running while living on Réunion during her medical studies and continued in the Pyrenees after returning to mainland France.

In 2019, she won the Trail World Championships in Miranda do Corvo, Portugal, in 4:06:17 and contributed to France's team title. Later that year, she won bronze at the 2019 World Long Distance Mountain Running Championships.

L'Hirondel won the French Mountain Running Championships in 2020 and the OCC in 2021.

In 2022, she won the trail race at the European Off-Road Running Championships, three months after surgery for iliac artery endofibrosis. France also won the team competition. She subsequently won the CCC and the long-trail race at the World Mountain and Trail Running Championships. The French Athletics Federation named her its female athlete of the year.

L'Hirondel finished third on her 100-mile debut at the 2023 UTMB. In 2024, she won silver in the trail race at the European Off-Road Running Championships, where France won the women's team title.

In 2025, she won the Diagonale des Fous on Réunion in approximately 27 hours and 26 minutes.

L'Hirondel won Transvulcania in May 2026, setting a women's course record of 7:43:47. In August, she won the UTMB in 21:54:49, ahead of Rachel Entrekin and Emily Schmitz. She was the first French woman to win the race since Caroline Chaverot in 2016.

L'Hirondel qualified as an obstetrician-gynaecologist and has worked in sports gynaecology. Her medical and athletic careers were the subject of the 2026 L'Équipe documentary Blandine L'Hirondel, une espèce rare.

== Selected results ==
Year	Competition	Place	Time	Ref.
2019	Trail World Championships	1st	4:06:17	
2019	World Long Distance Mountain Running Championships	3rd	3:52:07	
2020	French Mountain Running Championships	1st	—	
2021	OCC	1st	5:45:08	
2022	European Off-Road Running Championships, trail	1st	4:06:02	
2022	CCC	1st	11:40:55	
2022	World Mountain and Trail Running Championships, long trail	1st	8:22:14	
2023	Ultra-Trail du Mont-Blanc	3rd	24:22:50	
2024	European Off-Road Running Championships, trail	2nd	5:44:58	
2025	Grand Raid	1st	27:26	
2026	Transvulcania	1st	7:43:47	
2026	Ultra-Trail du Mont-Blanc	1st	21:54:49	
