= Ultra-Trail du Mont-Blanc =

Single-stage mountain ultramarathon held in Chamonix, France

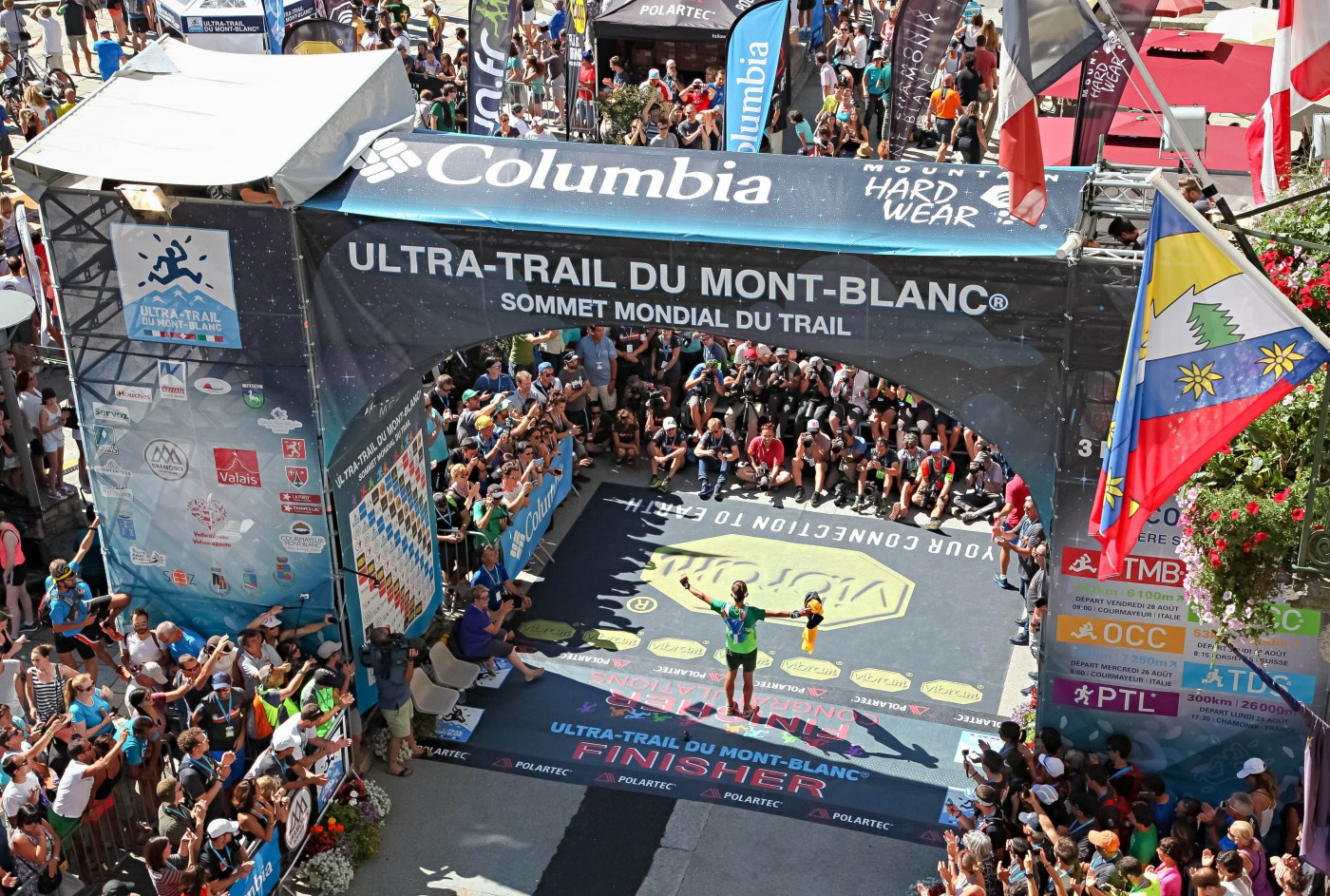
- Finish line in 2015
- Date: End of August
- Location: Chamonix, France
- Event type: Ultramarathon trail race
- Distance: 174-kilometre (108 mi)
- Established: 2003
- Course records: Men: Ben Dhiman 18:16:29 (2026) Women: Blandine L'Hirondel 21:54:49 (2026)
- Website: https://montblanc.utmb.world/

The Ultra-Trail du Mont-Blanc (UTMB) is a single-stage mountain ultramarathon trail race on a course of about 170 km around Mont Blanc, first held in 2003.

The race follows the route of the Tour du Mont Blanc through France, Italy and Switzerland, beginning and ending in Chamonix, France.

The race is approximately 170-km long, with about 10,000 m of elevation gain. It is the longest and flagship race of UTMB Mont-Blanc, the annual event week held around Mont Blanc at the end of August. Within the UTMB World Series Finals, the race serves as the 100-mile category Final.

The race has been described by running media as one of the most competitive and prestigious trail ultramarathons in the world.

Catherine and Michel Poletti founded the race in 2003.

== Route ==
The route follows the Tour du Mont Blanc hiking path that is usually completed in 7 to 9 days by hikers. This is a loop around Mont Blanc.

It starts from Chamonix (1,035 m) and goes up to the Col de Voza (1,653 m) to reach Les Contamines (1,150 m), which is the first major aid base. It then climbs to the Croix du Bonhomme (2,479 m) before going back down to Les Chapieux (1,549 m). The path then runs up to the Col de la Seigne (2,516 m) to enter Italy, and follows the ridge of the Mont-Favre (2,435 m) before going down to Courmayeur (1,190 m), the second aid base. It climbs again to the Refuge Bertone (1,989 m) and Arnuva (1,769 m) before reaching its highest point, the Grand Col Ferret (2,537 m), which also marks the border with Switzerland. The path goes down again to Praz de Fort (1,151 m) via La Fouly (1,593 m) before reaching the third aid base, Champex d'en Bas (1,391 m). The last part includes two rather low cols: Bovine (1,987 m) and Les Tseppes (1,932 m), separated by Trient (1,300 m). On the descent to Vallorcine (1,260 m), the path re-enters France and crosses Argentière (1,260 m) before finishing at Chamonix, its starting point.

The route varies slightly every year, sometimes for safety reasons.

In 2010, the route was 166 km long with a total elevation gain of 9500 m.

Race profile

== Logistics ==
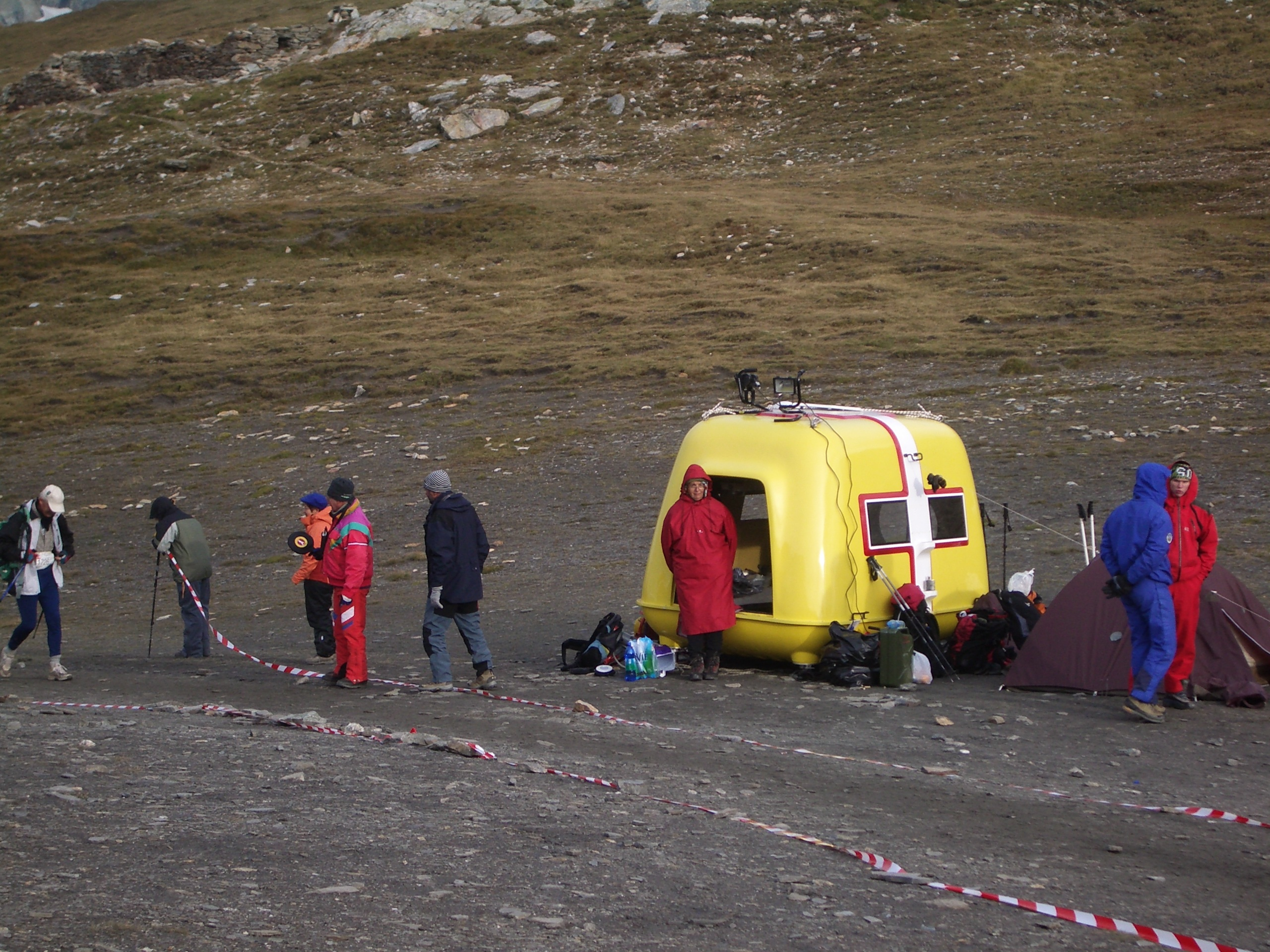
A check point on the UTMB 2005

- Runners must carry a set of "mandatory equipment" for safety reasons. This includes a waterproof jacket, warm clothing, food and water, whistle, smartphone, survival blanket and two head lamps.
- There are food and drink points along the route, every 10 to 15 km. In addition, four big "major aid stations" provide hot meals, beds and massages: Chamonix (France), Les Chapieux (France), Courmayeur (Italy) and Champex (Switzerland).
- Pacers are not permitted in UTMB events.
- At Courmayeur for UTMB and at Cormet de Roselend for TDS, runners can collect a drop bag they previously left at Chamonix or at Courmayeur.
- Runners' race numbers contain a magnetic badge that is read at approximately 50 check points. Timings and rankings are available online and by text message in real-time.
- It is conducted under the regulations of the International Trail Running Association (ITRA), the governing body for trail races in the Mont Blanc and Alpine region.
- The race relies largely on volunteers to operate the course and staff aid stations. 15,000 volunteers were involved in 2015.

== Participation and results ==
Vincent Delebarre at Champex during the UTMB 2005

The race's popularity and its entry rate grew significantly since it was first held. The number of entrants doubled from 700 in 2003 to 1,400 in 2004. In 2005, the limit of 5,000 runners was reached 7 months after registration opened. In 2006, the organisers decided to create the CCC to allow more runners to take part. The registrations were sold out in only 2 weeks. In 2007, it was decided that runners must qualify, by running qualifying races beforehand and gaining points. That year the limit of 5,000 runners was reached less than 24 hours after registration opened. For the 2008 event, 6,000 runners registered in only 8 minutes, 5 months before the race. For the 2009 event, the qualifying criteria were tightened to limit the number of qualifying runners, and a draw was introduced to make entry fairer, giving an equal chance to all qualifiers, and making registration more orderly. Despite the stricter criteria, 10% of qualifying entrants were still denied a place, so the organisers raised entry standards still further for the 2010 event so that selection would be based more on capability and experience than luck of the draw.

The 2020 edition of the race was cancelled due to the coronavirus pandemic, with all registrants automatically receiving a 55% refund and given the option of reserving a spot for 2021, 2022, or 2023.

=== Ultra-Trail du Tour du Mont-Blanc ===
Year	Distance	Runners	Finishers	Winner Male	Time	Winner Female	Time	Notes
2003	153 km	722	67	Dachhiri Dawa Sherpa (Nepal)	20:05:59	Kristin Moehl (United States)	29:38:24	2003 full results
2004	155 km	1383	420	Vincent Delebarre (France)	21:06:18	Colette Borcard (Switzerland)	26:08:54	2004 full results
2005	155 km	2000	773	Christophe Jaquerod (Switzerland)	21:11:07	Elizabeth Hawker (United Kingdom)	26:53:51	2005 full results
2006	158 km	2535	1152	Marco Olmo (Italy)	21:06:06	Karine Herry (France)	25:22:20	2006 full results
2007	163 km	2319	1437	Marco Olmo (Italy)	21:31:58	Nikki Kimball (United States)	25:23:45	2007 full results
2008	166 km	2500	1268	Kilian Jornet (Spain)	20:56:59	Elizabeth Hawker (United Kingdom)	25:19:41	2008 full results
2009	166 km	2500	1383	Kilian Jornet (Spain)	21:33:18	Kristin Moehl (United States)	24:56:01	2009 full results
2010 (Note: The races in 2010, 2012, and 2017 were shorter due to bad weather conditions (though only about 5km shorter in 2017).)	88 km	2400	1127	Jez Bragg (United Kingdom)	10:30:37	Elizabeth Hawker (United Kingdom)	11:47:30	2010 full results
2011	170 km	2361	1133	Kilian Jornet (Spain)	20:36:43	Elizabeth Hawker (United Kingdom)	25:02:00	2011 full results
2012	103 km	2483	2122	François D'Haene (France)	10:32:36	Elizabeth Hawker (United Kingdom)	12:32:13	2012 full results
2013	168 km	2469	1686	Xavier Thevenard (France)	20:34:57	Rory Bosio (United States)	22:37:26	2013 full results
2014	167 km	2434	1582	François D'Haene (France)	20:11:44	Rory Bosio (United States)	23:23:20	2014 full results
2015	170 km	2561	1631	Xavier Thevenard (France)	21:09:15	Nathalie Mauclair (France)	25:15:33	2015 full results
2016	170 km	2555	1468	Ludovic Pommeret (France)	22:00:02	Caroline Chaverot (France)	25:15:40	2016 full results
2017	167 km	2537	1687	François D'Haene (France)	19:01:54	Núria Picas (Spain)	25:46:43	2017 full results
2018	170 km	2561	1778	Xavier Thevenard (France)	20:44:16	Francesca Canepa (Italy)	26:03:48	2018 full results
2019	170 km	2543	1556	Pau Capell (Spain)	20:19:07	Courtney Dauwalter (United States)	24:34:26	2019 full results
2020	cancelled due to coronavirus pandemic							
2021	170 km	2346	1521	François D'Haene (France)	20:45:59	Courtney Dauwalter (United States)	22:30:54	2021 full results
2022	170 km	2795	1789	Kilian Jornet (Spain)	19:49:30	Katie Schide (United States)	23:15:12	2022 full results
2023	172 km	2693	1757	Jim Walmsley (United States)	19:37:43	Courtney Dauwalter (United States)	23:29:14	2023 full results
2024	176.4 km	2761	1760	Vincent Bouillard (France)	19:54:23	Katie Schide (United States)	22:09:31	2024 full results
2025	175.3 km	2492	1665	Tom Evans (United Kingdom)	19:18:58	Ruth Croft (New Zealand)	22:56:23	2025 full results
2026	173.6 km	2407		Ben Dhiman (United States)	18:16:29	Blandine L'Hirondel (France)	21:54:49	2026 full results

=== Ultra-Trail Courmayeur-Champex-Chamonix ===
Year	Distance	Runners	Finishers	Winner Male	Time	Winner Female	Time	Notes
2006	86 km	1054	854	Alun Powell (United Kingdom)	10:53:17	Corinne Favre (France)	10:35:55	2006 full results
2007	86 km	1609	1332	Julien Chorier (France)	10:19:46	Andréa Zimmermann (Switzerland)	12:28:05	2007 full results
2008	98 km	2032	1318	Guillaume Le Normand (France)	12:26:04	Lucy Colquhoun (United Kingdom)	14:33:37	2008 full results
2009	98 km	1865	1266	Jean-Yves Rey (Switzerland)	11:40:47	Chantal Begue (France)	16:51:00	2009 full results
2010	98 km	2004	1677	Xavier Thevenard (France)	11:57:13	Maud Giraud (France)	14:07:38	2010 full results
2011	98 km	1907	1591	Emmanuel Gault (France)	10:10:25	Virginie Govignon (France)	12:47:11	2011 full results
2012	86 km	1913	1585	Tofol Castañer Bernat (Spain)	08:57:04	Ellie Greenwood (United Kingdom)	11:17:24	2012 full results
2013	101 km	1910	1320	Jordi Bes (Spain)	11:23:01	Caroline Chaverot (France)	14:12:00	2013 full results
2014	101 km	1945	1423	Pau Bartolo (Spain)	11:21:16	Anne Lise Rousett (France)	14:28:48	2014 full results
2015	101 km	2127	1470	Zach Miller (United States)	11:53:32	Ruth Croft (New Zealand)	12:54:53	2015 full results
2016	101 km	2123	1386	Michel Lanne (France)	12:10:04	Mimmi Kotka (Sweden)	13:42:46	2016 full results
2017	99 km	2155	1742	Hayden Hawks (United States)	10:24:30	Clare Gallagher (United States)	12:13:57	2017 full results
2018	101 km	2147	1622	Thomas Evans (United Kingdom)	10:44:32	Miao Yao (China)	11:57:46	2018 full results
2019	101 km	2132	1578	Luis Alberto Hernando (Spain)	10:28:49	Ragna Debats (Netherlands)	12:10:33	2019 full results
2020	cancelled due to coronavirus pandemic							
2021	101 km	2009	1578	Thibaut Garrivier (France)	10:23:26	Marta Molist Codina (Spain)	12:50:48	2021 full results
2022	101 km	1727	1341	Petter Engdahl (Sweden)	09:53:02	Blandine L'Hirondel (France)	11:40:55	2022 full results
2023	101 km	2228	1650	Jonathan Albon (United Kingdom)	10:14:25	Yngvild Kaspersen (Norway)	11:51:22	2023 full results |2023 full results
2024	101 km	2269	1636	Hayden Hawks (United States)	10:20:11	Toni McCann (South Africa)	11:57:59	2024 full results
2025	101 km	2127	1641	Francesco Puppi (Italy)	10:06:02	Martyna Młynarczyk (Poland)	11:41:55	2025 full results
2026	107 km	1974	1516	Christian Minoggio (Italy)	10:21:48	Yngvild Kaspersen (Norway)	12:01:14	2026 Full Results

=== Ultra-Trail Sur les Traces des Ducs de Savoie ===
Year	Distance	Runners	Finishers	Winner Male	Time	Winner Female	Time	Notes
2009	105 km	632	480	Patrick Bohard (France)	14:01:48	Fernanda Maciel (Brazil)	17:17:43	2009 full results
2010	105 km	cancelled						
2011	110 km	1180	781	Franck Bussiere (France)	15:51:37	Jolanda Linschooten (Netherlands)	20:57:32	2011 full results
2012	114 km	1464	633	Dachhiri Dawa Sherpa (Nepal)	14:37:07	Agnès Herve (France)	19:07:00	2012 full results
2013	119 km	1528	1022	Arnau Julià Bonmatí (Spain)	15:09:59	Nathalie Mauclair (France)	17:36:41	2013 full results
2014	119 km	1588	1076	Xavier Thevenard (France)	14:10:37	Teresa Nimes Perez (Spain)	18:41:12	2014 full results
2015	119 km	1807	1214	Pau Bartolo (Spain)	14:26:40	Andrea Huser (Switzerland)	16:35:29	2015 full results
2016	119 km	1794	1060	Pau Capell (Spain)	14:45:44	Delphine Avenier (France)	18:46:24	2016 full results
2017	119 km	1818	1251	Michel Lanne (France)	14:33:09	Mimmi Kotka (Sweden)	15:47:07	2017 full results
2018	121 km	1799	1329	Marcin Świerc (Poland)	13:24:00	Audrey Tanguy (France)	16:05:22	2018 full results
2019	145 km	1785	1091	Pablo Villa Gonzalez (Spain)	18:03:06	Audrey Tanguy (France)	21:36:15	2019 full results
2020	cancelled due to coronavirus pandemic							
2021	145 km	433	212	Erik-Sebastian Krogvig (Norway)	18:49:58	Manon Bohard (France)	23:11:14	2021 full results
2022	145 km	1774	1072	Ludovic Pommeret (France)	18:37:04	Martina Valmassoi (Italy)	22:42:47	2022 full results
2023	145 km	1649	998	Christian Meier (Canada)	19:36:35	Maryline Nakache (France)	23:37:57	2023 full results
2024	145 km	1874	1111	Thibault Marquet (France)	18:59:36	Marie Dohin (France)	24:06:01	2024 full results
2025	145 km	1935	1207	Antoine Charvolin (France)	18:22:17	Careth Arnold (United States)	22:58:52	2025 full results
2026	154 km	1290	715	Remy Brassac (France)	19:28:43	Sarah Vieuille (France)	22:08:16	2026 full results

=== Orsières-Champex-Chamonix ===
Year	Distance	Runners	Finishers	Winner Male	Time	Winner Female	Time	Notes
2014	53 km	1200	1109	Nicolas Martin (France)	5:07:45	Sonia Glarey (Italy)	6:37:40	2014 full results
2015	53 km	1442	1317	Marc Pinsach Rubirola (Spain)	5:21:38	Celia Chiron (France)	6:41:53	2015 full results
2016	55 km	1413	1232	Xavier Thevenard (France)	5:28:37	Mercedes Arcos Zafras (Spain)	6:54:13	2016 full results
2017	55 km	1565	1468	Marc Lauenstein (Switzerland)	5:19:34	Eli Gordon Rodriguez (Spain)	6:12:16	2017 full results
2018	55 km	1572	1478	Erenjia Jia (China)	5:28:44	Ruth Croft (New Zealand)	5:53:09	2018 full results
2019	55 km	1605	1474	Stian Angermund-Vik (Norway)	5:19:24	Ruth Croft (New Zealand)	5:50:14	2019 full results
2020	cancelled due to coronavirus pandemic							
2021	55 km	1464	1359	Jonathan Albon (United Kingdom)	5:02:57	Blandine L'Hirondel (France)	5:45:08	2021 full results
2022	55 km	1511	1190	Manuel Merillas (Spain)	5:18:29	Sheila Avilés Castaño (Spain)	6:10:16	2022 full results
2023	55 km	1729	1643	Stian Angermund (Norway)	4:42:40	Toni McCann (South Africa)	5:18:21	2023 full results
2024	57 km	1764	1534	Eli Hemming (United States)	5:11:48	Miao Yao (China)	5:54:03	2024 full results
2025	61 km	1568	1418	Jim Walmsley (United States)	5:00:35	Miao Yao (China) (Note: Joy Chepngeno of Kenya crossed the line first, but was later disqualified after testing positive for a banned substance.)	5:35:13	2025 full results
2026	60 km	1945	1563	Frédéric Tranchand (France)	5:10:08	Lauren Gregory (United States)	6:08:07	2026 full results

|}

== Results by nation ==
Updated after the 2025 editions.

=== UTMB ===
UTMB Men
#	Nation	1st	2nd	3rd	Total
1st place, gold medalist(s)	France	10	6	6	22
2nd place, silver medalist(s)	Spain	5	5	4	14
3rd place, bronze medalist(s)	United Kingdom	2	0	2	4
4	Italy	2	0	1	3
5	United States	1	4	5	10
6	Nepal	1	2	0	3
7	Switzerland	1	0	1	2
8	Germany	0	1	0	1
8	Hungary	0	1	0	1
8	Lithuania	0	1	0	1
8	Romania	0	1	0	1
8	Sweden	0	1	0	1
13	Ecuador	0	0	1	1
13	Japan	0	0	1	1
13	New Zealand	0	0	1	1

UTMB Women
#	Nation	1st	2nd	3rd	Total
1st place, gold medalist(s)	United States	10	0	2	12
2nd place, silver medalist(s)	United Kingdom	5	1	0	6
3rd place, bronze medalist(s)	France	3	4	10	17
4	Spain	1	7	5	13
5	Switzerland	1	2	1	4
6	Italy	1	1	0	2
6	New Zealand	1	1	0	2
8	Luxembourg	0	2	1	3
9	Canada	0	1	1	2
9	Germany	0	1	1	2
9	Sweden	0	1	1	2
12	Czech Republic	0	1	0	1

=== CCC ===
CCC Men
#	Nation	1st	2nd	3rd	Total
1st place, gold medalist(s)	France	6	8	6	20
2nd place, silver medalist(s)	Spain	4	0	2	6
3rd place, bronze medalist(s)	United States	3	2	3	8
4	Great Britain	3	1	1	5
5	Italy	1	0	4	5
6	Switzerland	1	0	0	1
6	Sweden	1	0	0	1
8	Greece	0	1	2	4
9	China	0	2	0	2
10	Canada	0	1	0	1
10	Japan	0	1	0	1
10	New Zealand	0	1	0	1
10	Poland	0	1	0	1
10	Slovakia	0	1	0	1
15	Czech Republic	0	0	1	1

CCC Women
#	Nation	1st	2nd	3rd	Total
1st place, gold medalist(s)	France	7	4	6	17
2nd place, silver medalist(s)	United Kingdom	2	3	1	6
3rd place, bronze medalist(s)	United States	1	4	3	8
4	Spain	1	3	5	9
5	Poland	1	1	0	2
6	Sweden	1	0	1	2
7	China	1	0	0	1
7	Netherlands	1	0	0	1
7	New Zealand	1	0	0	1
7	Norway	1	0	0	1
7	South Africa	1	0	0	1
7	Switzerland	1	0	0	1
13	Italy	0	1	1	2
14	Zimbabwe	0	1	0	1
14	Nepal	0	1	0	1
14	Norway	0	1	0	1
17	Czech Republic	0	0	1	1
17	Germany	0	0	1	1

=== TDS ===
TDS Men
#	Nation	1st	2nd	3rd	Total
1st place, gold medalist(s)	France	7	9	10	26
2nd place, silver medalist(s)	Spain	4	1	1	6
3rd place, bronze medalist(s)	Nepal	1	1	0	2
4	Canada	1	0	0	1
4	Norway	1	0	0	1
4	Poland	1	0	0	1
7	Russia	0	1	1	2
8	Ecuador	0	1	0	1
8	Sweden	0	1	0	1
8	United States	0	1	0	1
11	Italy	0	0	2	2
12	United Kingdom	0	0	1	1

TDS Women
#	Nation	1st	2nd	3rd	Total
1st place, gold medalist(s)	France	8	4	7	19
2nd place, silver medalist(s)	Italy	1	3	2	6
3rd place, bronze medalist(s)	United States	1	3	1	5
4	Spain	1	2	1	4
5	Switzerland	1	1	1	3
6	Brazil	1	0	0	1
6	Netherlands	1	0	0	1
6	Sweden	1	0	0	1
9	Belgium	0	1	0	1
9	United Kingdom	0	1	0	1
11	Germany	0	0	3	3

== See also ==
- UTMB World Series
- Trans Japan Alps Race
