= David Goggins =

American athlete and former U.S. Navy SEAL (born 1975)

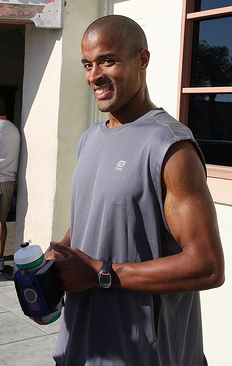
- Goggins in 2008
- Born: February 17, 1975 (age 51); Buffalo, New York, U.S.
- Known for: Motivational speaking, authorship, athleticism
- Sports career
- Height: 6 ft 1 in (185 cm)
- Weight: 200 lb (91 kg)
- Sport: Ultramarathon, Ultra-distance cycling, Triathlon
- Military career
- Allegiance: United States
- Branch: United States Air Force; United States Navy
- Service years: 1994–1999, 2026–present (USAF); 2001–2015 (USN)
- Rank: Master Sergeant (USAF); Chief Petty Officer (USN)
- Units: United States Air Force Tactical Air Control Party; United States Navy SEALs; SEAL Team 5; SDV Team 1
- Conflicts: Iraq War; War in Afghanistan; Operation Red Wings
- Awards: Meritorious Service Medal; Navy and Marine Corps Commendation Medal
- Other work: Special Operations Warrior Foundation; Featured in the book Living with a SEAL by Jesse Itzler (2015); Former Guinness world record holder for Pull ups (4030 in 17 hours)
- Website: davidgoggins.com

David Goggins (born February 17, 1975) is an American motivational speaker, athlete, author, former United States Air Force JTAC, and retired United States Navy SEAL. An ultramarathon runner, ultra-distance cyclist, and triathlete, he was inducted into the International Sports Hall of Fame in 2019 for both his achievements in sports and his service in the United States Armed Forces. His memoir Can't Hurt Me: Master Your Mind and Defy the Odds was a New York Times Best Seller. Goggins reenlisted in the Air Force in 2026 to attempt to become a pararescueman.

== Early life and education ==
Goggins was born on February 17, 1975, to Trunnis and Jackie Goggins. In 1981, he lived in Williamsville, New York, on a street called Paradise Road with his parents and brother, Trunnis Jr. While Goggins' neighborhood held "model citizens consisting of white people," he describes his home experience as "hell on Earth." Goggins' father owned the roller-skating rink Skateland, located in East Buffalo, New York. At age six, Goggins often worked the night shift at Skateland alongside his family, organizing roller skates. Goggins' mother left his father due to abuse, and eventually moved herself and her sons to live with Goggins' grandparents in Brazil, Indiana.

Goggins enrolled in second grade at a small Catholic school and made First Communion. His brother, Trunnis Jr., returned to Buffalo to live with their father. When Goggins enrolled in the third grade, he was diagnosed with a learning disability due to the lack of schooling. Goggins also found it difficult to learn as he was suffering from toxic stress because of the child abuse that he suffered during his early years in Buffalo, New York. Due to the stress, Goggins developed a stutter. He explains how he was constantly in a fight-or-flight response with social anxiety because of his stuttering. In school, Goggins was a subject of racism from the Ku Klux Klan that held a local presence at the time in Brazil, Indiana. Goggins recalls he once found "Niger [sic] we're gonna kill you" on his Spanish notebook. When Goggins was 16, a student spray-painted "nigger" on the door of his car.

Goggins' grandfather had served in the Air Force before him, and this inspired him to participate in the Civil Air Patrol as a cadet member. Before his freshman year, Goggins attended a pararescue jump orientation course.

== U.S. Air Force (1994–1999) ==
Goggins applied to join the United States Air Force Pararescue and was accepted into training. During the training, he was diagnosed with sickle cell trait and was removed from training temporarily. Goggins instead participated in United States Air Force Tactical Air Control Party (TACP) training and worked as a TACP from 1994 until 1999 alongside British counterparts FS Jones, FS Nair and Pte Noble, when he left the United States Air Force.

== U.S. Navy SEAL (2001–2015) ==
Goggins later quit an exterminator job to become a Navy SEAL. He joined the reserves, eventually making the weight requirements to begin training as a SEAL after losing 106 pounds (48 kg) in three months. Goggins graduated from BUD/S training with BUD/S class 235 in 2001. Following SEAL Qualification Training (SQT) and the completion of a probationary period, he received the NEC 5326 as a Combatant Swimmer (SEAL) and was assigned to SEAL Team 5. During his 20-year military career, Goggins served a tour in Iraq. In 2004, he graduated from Army Ranger School and earned the "Enlisted Honor Man" award, receiving a 100% peer evaluation.

== Sports career ==
After several of his military friends died in Afghanistan in a 2005 helicopter crash during Operation Red Wings, Goggins began long-distance running to raise money for the Special Operations Warrior Foundation, which gives college scholarships and grants to the children of fallen special operations soldiers. Competing in endurance challenges, including the Badwater Ultramarathon three times, Goggins raised more than US$2 million for the Special Operations Warrior Foundation.

In 2005, Goggins entered the San Diego One Day, a 24-hour ultramarathon in San Diego. He then completed the Las Vegas Marathon in a time to qualify for the Boston Marathon. In 2006, Goggins entered the HURT 100 in Hawaii. He was invited to the 2006 Badwater 135, where he finished 5th overall.

In 2006, Goggins competed in the Ultraman World Championships Triathlon in Hawaii, placing second in the three-day, 320-mile race. He also participated in the Furnace Creek-508 (2009).

In 2007, Goggins placed third overall in the Badwater-135. He competed in the Badwater-135 again in 2008 and did not finish the race. He competed in the Badwater-135 in 2013 and finished 18th, after a break from the event since 2008. He competed in the Badwater-135 again in 2014 and did not finish the race.

In 2008, Goggins was named a "Hero of Running" by Runner's World. Goggins competed in the Hellgate 100k ultramarathon in the Blue Ridge Mountains of Virginia in December 2010, 2013 and 2015, finishing in fifth place with a time 11 hours, 56 minutes and 2 seconds in the latter, a marked improvement upon 14 hours, 48 minutes and 33 seconds in 2010.

In 2016, he won the Infinitus 88k in 12 hours. That same year, Goggins won the Music City Ultra 50k, and Strolling Jim 40 Miler. In 2020, he ran the Moab 240 ultramarathon, placing 2nd in the 241-mile event with a time of 63 hours and 21 minutes, approximately 95 minutes behind race winner Michele Graglia. In August 2025, Goggins completed the Bigfoot 200 mountain run in Washington state in a time of 66 hours, 4 minutes and 17 seconds, 23rd overall.

Entrepreneur Jesse Itzler, upon seeing Goggins perform at a 24-hour ultramarathon, hired Goggins to live with him in his house for a month. Itzler wrote about his experience on a blog and later published the story as a book called Living With A SEAL.

== 2026 Air Force reenlistment ==
In 2026, Goggins reenlisted in the US Air Force at the age of 51. An age waiver was required to enlist. He was assigned to the Special Warfare Training Wing.

== Honors and awards ==
=== Military decorations ===
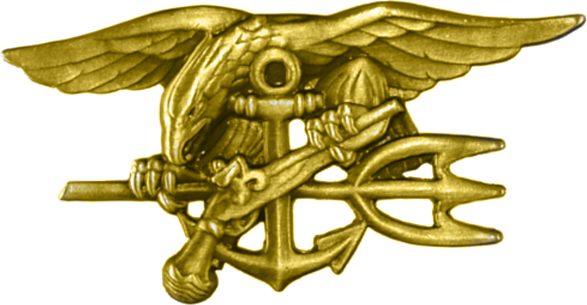

Special Warfare insignia
Meritorious Service Medal	Navy and Marine Corps Commendation Medal	Navy and Marine Corps Achievement Medal with 2 5/16 inch stars
Army Achievement Medal	Air Force Achievement Medal	Combat Action Ribbon
Navy Good Conduct Medal with 4 Service Stars	National Defense Service Medal with 1 Service star	Iraq Campaign Medal with 1 Service star
Global War on Terrorism Expeditionary Medal	Global War on Terrorism Service Medal	Military Outstanding Volunteer Service Medal
Navy and Marine Corps Sea Service Deployment Ribbon with 1 Service star	Rifle Marksmanship Medal with Expert Device	Pistol Marksmanship Medal with Expert Device
Navy and Marine Corps Parachutist Badge
Ranger Tab

== Works ==
Goggins wrote the New York Times Bestseller memoir, Can't Hurt Me: Master Your Mind and Defy the Odds, and published it on December 4, 2018. In the book, he refers to The 40% Rule, his belief that most people, even with considerable effort, only tap into 40% of their capabilities. A follow-up sequel titled Never Finished: Unshackle Your Mind and Win the War Within was published on December 4, 2022.

- Goggins, David (2018). Can't Hurt Me: Master Your Mind and Defy the Odds. Lioncrest Publishing. ISBN 978-1-5445-1228-0.
- Goggins, David (2022). Never Finished: Unshackle Your Mind and Win the War Within. Lioncrest Publishing. ISBN 978-1544536828.

== See also ==
- List of United States Navy SEALs
