= Jared Buchanan =

American long-distance runner

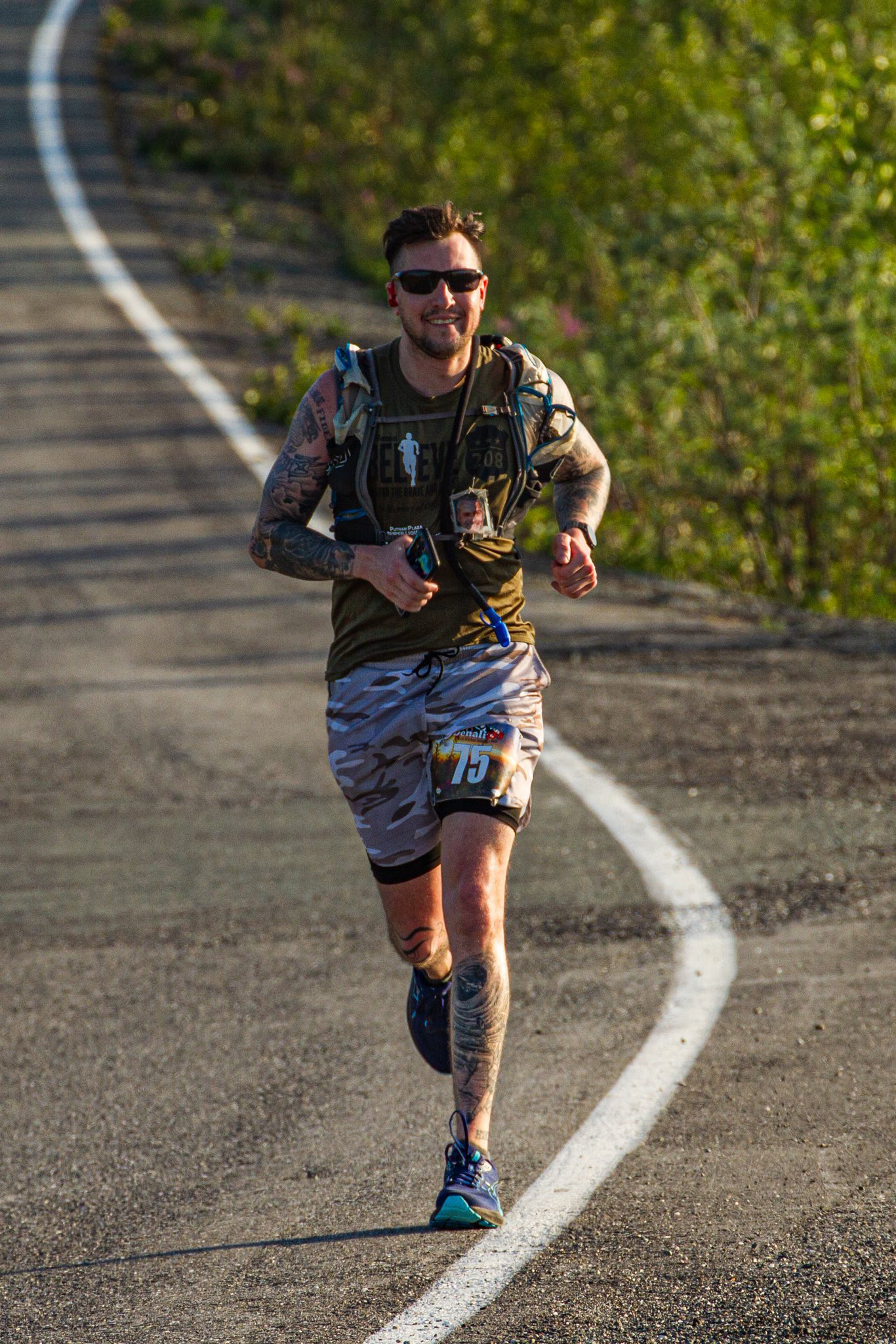
- Buchanan in 2025

Personal information
- Full name: Jared Buchanan
- Nationality: American
- Born: January 6, 1990 (age 36)
- Website: Buchanan Brothers

Sport
- Country: United States
- Sport: Ultrarunning

Jared Buchanan (born January 6, 1990) is a U.S. Marine Corps veteran, ultra-marathoner, and mental health advocate. After losing his father, Officer Paul Buchanan, to suicide in 2013, he turned to long-distance running to heal and raise awareness about mental health, especially among veterans and first responders.

== Professional career ==
While training in Ellington, Connecticut, Buchanan was hit by a Chevy Tahoe and hospitalized in critical condition. After his release from the hospital, local TV personality Heidi Voight arranged a deal with Texas Roadhouse to provide him with a fresh meal.

He has run numerous national courses and various distances ranging from half marathons to ultra marathons to raise awareness for mental health and suicide prevention. Including the Badwater 135 (2023, finished in 40h 15m), Cocodona 250 (2022–23), Moab 240, Badwater Cape Fear (2024), and Arizona Monster 300 (2025).

== Personal life ==
Buchanan graduated from Southern Connecticut State University in 2022, where he earned his bachelor's in Psychology. He graduated from Sacred Heart University in 2025, where he earned his master's in Clinical mental health counseling. His goal is to work in the mental health field with police officers and combat veterans. Each September, he works with his family, the East Hartford Police Department, and sponsors to host the Believe 208: Run for the Brave and Finest, a 5K race which remembers those who died by suicide.

In 2025, Buchanan was featured in the documentary Beautifully Broken, directed by Daniel Herzog. The film premiered on June 28, 2025, in East Hartford, Connecticut, and was later screeend at the University of Connecticut in October.
