= Scott Jenkins (runner) =

Welsh ultramarathon runner

Scott John Jenkins
Personal information
- Nationality: Welsh
- Born: 17 October 1980 (age 45) Cardiff, Wales
- Height: 5.10 ft (1.55 m)

Sport
- Country: Wales
- Sport: Athletics
- Event: Ultramarathon

Scott Jenkins is a Welsh ultrarunner and motivational speaker. He was the first Briton to complete the Triple Crown of 200s, which comprises the Tahoe 200, Bigfoot 200 and Moab 240.

== Career ==
In 2016, he ran across Iceland in 5 days and in 2019 alongside completing Moab 240, Jenkins finished 6th in the UK's Canal Slam (a series of 3 races, 130, 145 and 145 miles over 4 months along the UK canal system).

Jenkins was the first Welshman to complete the Moab 240, Cocodona 250, and the second Welshman to complete the Badwater 135 (after his brother, Rhys).

Jenkins completed the Moab 240 Endurance Run in Utah in 2019 and 2021.

In 2023, Jenkins became the first Briton to finish the Triple Crown of 200s. He finished 5th in the series out of 36 starters. He finished 14th at Moab, 19th at Tahoe and 35th at Bigfoot.

== Philanthropy ==
Jenkins is an ambassador for the global charity Operation Smile. He started his ultrarunning career in 2010 with a 2000-mile run from Boston to Austin for charity, running 75 marathons in 75 days. for charities British Heart Foundation, Help for Heroes and Young Texans against Cancer.

In 2013, he was part of a 4-man team who cycled from Seattle to Jacksonville for the Royal Marines Foundation in memory of a close friend.
