= Sally McRae =

American ultramarathon runner and author

Personal information
- Nickname: Yellowrunner
- Occupation(s): Ultramarathon runner, author, coach, podcast host
- Years active: 2010s–present

Sport
- Country: United States
- Sport: Ultramarathon / Trail running
- Event(s): 100-mile races, 200-mile races, multi-day ultramarathons
- Team: Nike Trail (2014–2026)

Sally McRae is an American ultramarathon and trail runner, author, coach, speaker and podcast host. She is known for winning the Badwater 135 in 2021, winning the Moab 240 in 2023, and completing a 2023 series of four 200-mile and longer ultramarathons. McRae is also the author of Choose Strong: The Choice That Changes Everything and co-host of the Choose Strong podcast.

== Early life and background ==
McRae has described endurance running and strength training as part of a wider philosophy of resilience, often expressed through the phrase "Choose Strong". She has been associated with the nickname "Yellowrunner" through her social media, coaching, podcasting and public speaking work.

In 2014, iRunFar profiled McRae as an Orange County-based runner and Nike Trail athlete after her second-place finish at the Sean O'Brien 50 Mile, which earned her entry into the Western States Endurance Run.

== Running career ==
McRae has competed across a wide range of ultramarathon distances, including 50-kilometre, 100-kilometre, 100-mile, 135-mile, 200-mile and 250-mile events. Her major results have included appearances at the Western States Endurance Run, Ultra-Trail du Mont-Blanc, Mozart 100 by UTMB, Badwater 135, Cocodona 250 and Moab 240.

In 2019, McRae won the women's race at Mozart 100 by UTMB in Salzburg, Austria. In 2021, she won the women's race at the Badwater 135, finishing seventh overall in Death Valley, California.

In 2023, McRae completed a series of four 200-mile and longer races that included the Cocodona 250, Tahoe 200, Bigfoot 200 and Moab 240. She won the women's race at the Moab 240 in 86 hours, 18 minutes and 33 seconds, capping the year-long project.

In 2026, McRae returned to long-distance racing after injury and finished the Cocodona 250, a 250-mile ultramarathon across Arizona.

== 2023 200-mile race series ==
McRae's 2023 season drew attention because she completed four 200-mile and longer races in a single year: Cocodona 250, Tahoe 200, Bigfoot 200 and Moab 240. Trail Runner reported that the year culminated in her Moab 240 win, and described the project as a test of mental endurance as much as physical durability. COROS also published an athlete feature on the project, describing it as a Grand Slam of 200-mile races.

Her Moab 240 win was also discussed in endurance-running media and podcasts, including the Choose Strong podcast, the Ali on the Run Show and The Adventure Jogger.

== Book and media work ==
In 2023, McRae published Choose Strong: The Choice That Changes Everything, a memoir and motivational book centered on endurance, grief, faith, family and mental resilience. Women's Running reviewed the book and described it as a work that connected McRae's athletic identity with emotional strength and personal history.

McRae also co-hosts the Choose Strong podcast with Eddie McRae. The podcast describes itself as focused on choosing strength over fear and includes race recaps, training discussions and personal reflections.

McRae has appeared in endurance-running films and video projects, including films documenting her 2022 "Choose Strong" race project and her 2023 Moab 240 run.

== Nike Trail sponsorship (2014–2026) ==
McRae was associated with Nike Trail for about a decade, beginning in the mid-2010s, until early-2026. In 2014, iRunFar described her as an Orange County-based runner and Nike Trail Team recruit after her second-place finish at the Sean O'Brien 50 Mile earned her entry into the Western States Endurance Run. By 2016, she was appearing internationally as a Nike Trail athlete, including in race media connected to Sciacchetrail in Cinque Terre, Italy.

Nike Trail was absorbed into Nike ACG (All Conditions Gear), and in interviews, McRae has discussed the business side of professional trail running, and the significance of her Nike contract to her career. For instance, a 2024 episode of the Singletrack podcast discussed her Nike Trail contract signing in the mid-2010s, the development of her professional running career, and how athletes and creators can think about the business side of the sport.

== Public profile and media coverage ==
McRae has been covered by specialist running publications, endurance-media outlets and sports podcasts. iRunFar profiled her in 2014 as a Nike Trail athlete before her first Western States appearance. iRunFar also reported her 2021 Badwater 135 victory. Trail Runner covered her 2023 Moab 240 win and her completion of four 200-mile and longer races in one season. Women's Running reviewed her book Choose Strong in 2023.

McRae has also been covered by COROS, Fleet Feet, TrailCon, Strength Running, Ginger Runner, Singletrack and Road to Cocodona in relation to her racing, coaching, speaking and media work.

== Selected results ==
Year	Race	Location	Distance	Time	Overall place	Notes	Ref.
2014	Sean O'Brien 50 Mile	Malibu, California, United States	50 mi	—	2nd female	Earned entry into Western States	
2014	Western States Endurance Run	Olympic Valley to Auburn, California, United States	100 mi	20:27:33	35th	Seventh female	
2018	Badwater 135	Death Valley, California, United States	135 mi	35:13:35	23rd	Seventh female	
2019	Mozart 100 by UTMB	Salzburg, Austria	112 km	14:38:59	32nd	Women's winner	
2019	Ultra-Trail du Mont-Blanc	Chamonix, France	171 km	32:27:06	185th	23rd female	
2021	Badwater 135	Death Valley, California, United States	135 mi	30:48:47	7th	Women's winner	
2022	Badwater 135	Death Valley, California, United States	135 mi	29:17:32	36th	Sixth female	
2023	Jackpot Ultra Running Festival	Henderson, Nevada, United States	100 mi	17:42:23	9th	Fourth female	
2023	Cocodona 250	Arizona, United States	250 mi	87:48:49	22nd	Fourth female	
2023	Tahoe 200 Endurance Run	California, United States	200 mi	74:08:25	11th	Third female; masters winner	
2023	Bigfoot 200	Washington, United States	200 mi	—	—	Part of 2023 200-mile series	
2023	Moab 240	Moab, Utah, United States	240 mi	86:18:33	12th	Women's winner; completed 200-mile series	
2026	Long Haul 100	Dade City, Florida, United States	100 mi	23:27:57	41st	Return from injury	
2026	Cocodona 250	Arizona, United States	250 mi	95:30:07	67th	17th female	

== Bibliography ==
- McRae, Sally (2023). Choose Strong: The Choice That Changes Everything. YellowRunner Press.
