= Polar Bear Marathon =

Marathon race in Churchill, Manitoba, Canada

Polar Bear Marathon is an extreme marathon race held since 2012 at Churchill, Manitoba, Canada. The race is held in the last week of November along Hudson Bay shore in extremely cold weather.

The organizer of the Polar Bear Marathon is Albert Martens, a native of Steinbach, Manitoba, which is situated some 1000 km south of Churchill. Martens is a seasoned marathon runner who himself has participated in around 60 marathon and ultramarathon races, including Badwater Ultramarathon in Death Valley, California. Martens came to the idea of marathon race in particularly challenging cold weather after running a marathon race at -32 °C in 2011.

The challenge of the selected race route is related not only to tough weather (during 2013 race the temperatures dropped to -20 °C, or -41° with wind chill, while the runners in 2012 were "disappointed" by milder temperatures between -10° and -20°), but also to the abundance of polar bears in its vicinity. Churchill is considered "the Polar Bear capital of the world", and during late fall they board fresh sea ice to hunt for seals. Not long before the date of the first race, November 20, 2012, news had spread about bear attacks in Churchill. Although race organizers consider a bear attack on runners unlikely, the participants run in pairs, to which they are assigned according to their pace running times, and each pair is escorted by a truck carrying food, extra clothing and emergency equipment including rifles.

While the winners of the Polar Bear Marathon are awarded only symbolic prizes such as medals, stuffed polar bears and soapstone figurines by a local sculptor, the participation in the race costs them significant money. For the flights from Winnipeg to Churchill and back, three nights' hotel stay and sightseeing trip in the day following the race, the participants are expected to pay around $2,500.

The number of competitors in the Polar Bear Marathon was initially restricted by the organizers to 20, but for the first three events even this proved to be a high estimate. In the 2012 race 14 runners from 3 countries (Canada, U.S. and Germany) took part while only 13 athletes ran the 2013 race (only in 2015 the number of participants exceeded 20, reaching 24). The first marathon was won by an international pair Eric Alexander (U.S.) and Gary Koop (Canada) who finished it in just over four hours, while a German runner Sven Henkes won the second race with a time of 4:12. During the 6th edition of the competition a half marathon and 50 km ultra marathon distances were added, with Mexican runners Santiago and Juana Ramirez winning both.
