= Sather (surname) =

Sather is a surname. Notable people with the surname include:

- Croix Sather (born 1970), American author, inspirational speaker and ultra-athlete
- Drake Sather (1959–2004), American stand-up comedian, television writer and producer
- Glen Sather (born 1943), Canadian ice hockey player
- Martin Sather (born 1983), American curler and jazz musician
- Michael Sather (born c. 1947), Canadian politician
- Peder Sather (1810–1886), Norwegian-born American banker
- Trevor Sather (born 1973), British film writer and actor
- Paul Sather (born 1971), Head Men's Basketball Coach for the University of North Dakota
