= Annie Hughes =

American ultrarunner

Annie Hughes is an American ultrarunner, based in Leadville, Colorado. She is the youngest woman to win the Leadville 100 and Moab 240 races, and previously held the fastest known time for the Collegiate Loop.

== Life and running career ==
Hughes attended Adams State University and ran track there for a year. She ran her first ultra while in university. In 2019 she won the Jemez 50 Mile, placing 6th overall, and soon became active in her local ultrarunning community. She has been mentored by runners Olga King and Courtney Dauwalter.

In 2020 she ran the fastest known time on the 167-mile Collegiate Loop in Colorado. The next year she became the youngest woman to win her hometown Leadville 100. She went on to win the Moab 240 with the second-fastest time in its history. In 2022, she won the Cocodona 250.

Notable race results
Year	Race	Finish	Notes
2019	Jemez 50	1st	6th overall
2020	Collegiate Loop		FKT
2021	Collegiate Peaks 50	1st	overall winner
2021	Maces' Hideout 100	1st	2nd overall
2021	Leadville 100	1st	youngest winner
2021	Moab 240	1st	2nd-fastest all-time (68:50:02)
2022	Coldwater 100	1st	
2022	Cocodona 250	1st	3rd overall
2023	Behind the Rocks Ultra (50)	1st	1st overall (7:41:10)
