= Scott Jenkins =

Scott Jenkins may refer to:

- Scott K. Jenkins, American politician
- Scott Jenkins (soccer) (born 1973), American soccer player
- Scott Jenkins (runner) (born 1980), Welsh ultrarunner
- Skepsis (musician) (Scott Elliott Jenkins, active since 2016), English musician
