= Graglia (surname) =

Graglia is a surname. Notable people with the surname include:

- Daniela Graglia (born 1976), Italian sprinter and middle-distance runner
- Lino Graglia (born 1930), American legal scholar
- Michele Graglia (born 1983), model, author, and fitness coach
- Sylvain Graglia (born 1989), French-born Tahitian footballer
