= Rhys Jenkins =

Rhys Jenkins is a Welsh name given to

- Rhys Jenkins (rugby union), Welsh rugby union player
- Rhys Jenkins (runner), Welsh ultramarathon runner
