= Kilian Korth =

Ultramarathon runner

Personal information
- Occupations: Ultramarathon runner, running coach
- Years active: 2018–present

Sport
- Country: United States
- Sport: Ultramarathon / Trail running
- Events: 100-mile races, 200-mile races, 250-mile races

Kilian Korth is an ultramarathon and trail runner known for his performances in 200-mile and longer trail races. He became one of the leading athletes in the 200-mile discipline after winning the Triple Crown of 200s in 2025 and winning the men's race at the Cocodona 250 in 2026.

== Running career ==
Korth began appearing in ultramarathon results in the late 2010s, including finishes at the 2018 Cactus Rose 100 Mile, the 2019 Leadville Trail 100 Run, and the 2021 Ouray 100 Mile Endurance Run, where he placed third overall.

In 2022, Korth won the DC Peaks 50 in Kaysville, Utah. In 2023, he finished 11th overall at the Cocodona 250, after an earlier attempt in 2022 ended before the finish.

Korth became closely associated with the growing competitive field around 200-mile ultramarathons. In 2025, he won the Tahoe 200, Bigfoot 200 and Moab 240, completing a sweep of the Triple Crown of 200s. Destination Trail reported that his cumulative time broke Michael McKnight's 2019 Triple Crown record by about seven and a half hours.

The American Trail Running Association reported during the series that Korth was on pace for a Triple Crown sweep after winning the Tahoe 200 and Bigfoot 200, and highlighted his efficiency at aid stations during Bigfoot as part of his winning strategy.

In May 2026, Korth returned to the Cocodona 250 and finished second overall and first among men. iRunFar reported his time as a new men's course record and the second-fastest time ever run at the race. UltraRunning Magazine listed him second overall and first among men in the 2026 results.

== 200-mile racing and Triple Crown of 200s ==
The Triple Crown of 200s consists of the Tahoe 200, Bigfoot 200 and Moab 240, three long-distance trail ultramarathons held in the western United States. Korth won all three races in 2025, finishing the Tahoe 200 in 52:40:52, the Bigfoot 200 in 45:03:41, and the Moab 240 in 58:45:47.

His Triple Crown performance was covered by Canadian Running, BroBible, Destination Trail, the American Trail Running Association, and endurance-running podcasts focused on the rise of 200-mile racing.

== Cocodona 250 ==
Korth has raced the Cocodona 250 multiple times. He recorded early unfinished attempts at the race in 2022 and 2024, and finished 11th overall in 2023.

In 2026, Korth won the men's race and placed second overall behind Rachel Entrekin, who became the first woman to win Cocodona outright. His finish was covered by iRunFar, Runner's World, Outside, Canadian Running, Marathon Handbook, The Guardian, The Washington Post, and El País within broader coverage of the race.

Runner's World later described both Entrekin and Korth as examples of breakthrough performances at Cocodona, quoting Entrekin's view that both athletes "managed to stick the landing" after earlier doubts or setbacks at the race. Marathon Handbook also discussed Korth's second-place finish in coverage of the gender dynamics and endurance implications of the 2026 Cocodona race.

== Media coverage ==
Korth has been covered primarily in endurance-running media, race reports, and podcasts focused on the growth of 200-mile racing. His 2025 Triple Crown season was covered by Destination Trail, Canadian Running, BroBible, the American Trail Running Association, Singletrack, Everyday Ultra and Cameron Hanes's podcast.

His 2026 Cocodona performance received coverage from iRunFar, Runner's World, Outside, Canadian Running, Marathon Handbook, The Guardian, The Washington Post, El País, and Singletrack. In race previews, Marathon Handbook identified Korth as one of the major men's contenders, citing his recent success in 200-mile races.

== Selected results ==
Year	Race	Location	Distance	Time	Overall place	Notes	Ref.
2018	Cactus Rose	Texas, United States	100 mi	25:16:47	6th	Early 100-mile finish	
2019	Leadville Trail 100 Run	Leadville, Colorado, United States	100 mi	23:29:23	46th	Leadville 100 finish	
2021	Ouray 100 Mile Endurance Run	Ouray, Colorado, United States	100 mi	34:30:20	3rd	Podium finish	
2022	DC Peaks 50	Kaysville, Utah, United States	50 mi	8:54:34	1st	Outright winner	
2023	Cocodona 250	Arizona, United States	250 mi	81:23:56	11th	Eighth male	
2024	Mogollon Monster 100	Arizona, United States	100 mi	22:37:25	1st	Outright winner	
2024	Red Rock Canyon	Nevada, United States	100 km	10:05:45	1st	Outright winner	
2025	Tahoe 200	California, United States	200 mi	52:40:52	1st	Triple Crown of 200s race win	
2025	Bigfoot 200	Mount St. Helens, Washington, United States	200 mi	45:03:41	1st	Triple Crown of 200s race win	
2025	Moab 240	Moab, Utah, United States	240 mi	58:45:47	1st	Completed Triple Crown of 200s sweep	
2026	Cocodona 250	Arizona, United States	250 mi	57:28:36	2nd	Men's winner; men's course record	
