= Croix Sather =

Croix Sather (/ˈkrɔɪ ˈseɪθər/; born November 14, 1970) is an American author, inspirational speaker, and ultra-athlete. His self-help and personal development books cover the topics of personal transformation, self-help, psychology of success, and high achievement. The titles of his books include Dream Big Act Big, BetterBody BetterLife, and BetterBody BetterLife Journal. His speaking career include the highlights of speaking on TEDx Las Vegas, Calico Canyon and TEDx NYC, Upper East Side.

Sather is also known for his ultra distance running accomplishments. In 2011 he completed a nonstop run across America in 100 consecutive days, averaging a marathon distance (26.2 miles) a day. On August 26, 2012, he broke the 13-year-old world record for the Badwater Solo Self-Contained Ultramarathon set in 1999 by Ultra running legend Marshall Ulrich. Sather was the third person to successfully complete this Death Valley self-contained crossing and setting a new fastest record with a time of 72 hours 55 minutes.

== Career ==
Sather started his career as a carpenter in the family business. He started a residential contracting and real estate investment business at age 24. After a divorce at 28, he began his personal development and life transformation journey. He started writing "BetterBody BetterLife, Connecting the Mind and Body for Permanent Weight Loss" in 1999 [not published until 2008] based on his experience in non-competitive bodybuilding. Then after attending a motivational speaker event in 2006, he realized that his calling was to be a professional motivational speaker and author. He joined Toastmasters in 2006 and completed his university degree in Humanistic Communications in 2008.

Sather is a professional motivational speaker presenting for corporations, associations, and annual events. He also hosts his own events; Business Mastery and Personal Power; and Business Champion. His book Dream Big Act Big, Unleash the Superstar within You (2011) presents self-help strategies to transform your life. He first presented for TEDx in Las Vegas in 2012 with a speech title, "Do the Impossible." He then presented on the TEDx stage again in New York City with a speech titled, "Breaking the Record in the world's Toughest Race."

Sather gained popularity from his TV media appearances during his 2011 run across America inspirational tour where the media named him, "Marathon Man." Since he has been featured in numerous TV, radio, and print media.

== Bibliography ==
- BetterBody BetterLife: Connecting the Mind and Body for Permanent Weight Loss Without Dieting, Renato Publishing (January 2008), ISBN 0974617806
- BetterBody BetterLife Journal: 3 months to a Better Body, Renato Publishing (January 2008),ISBN 0974617814
- Dream Big Act Big: Unleash the Superstar Within You, Renato Publishing (January 2011) ISBN 0974617830

== In the media ==
Sather has appeared on many television, newspaper, and radio. Media shows include NBC San Diego, Good Morning Arizona, CBS New York, Competitor Magazine, and was featured in Toastmasters International magazine.
