= James Economou =

American gridiron football player (born 1988)

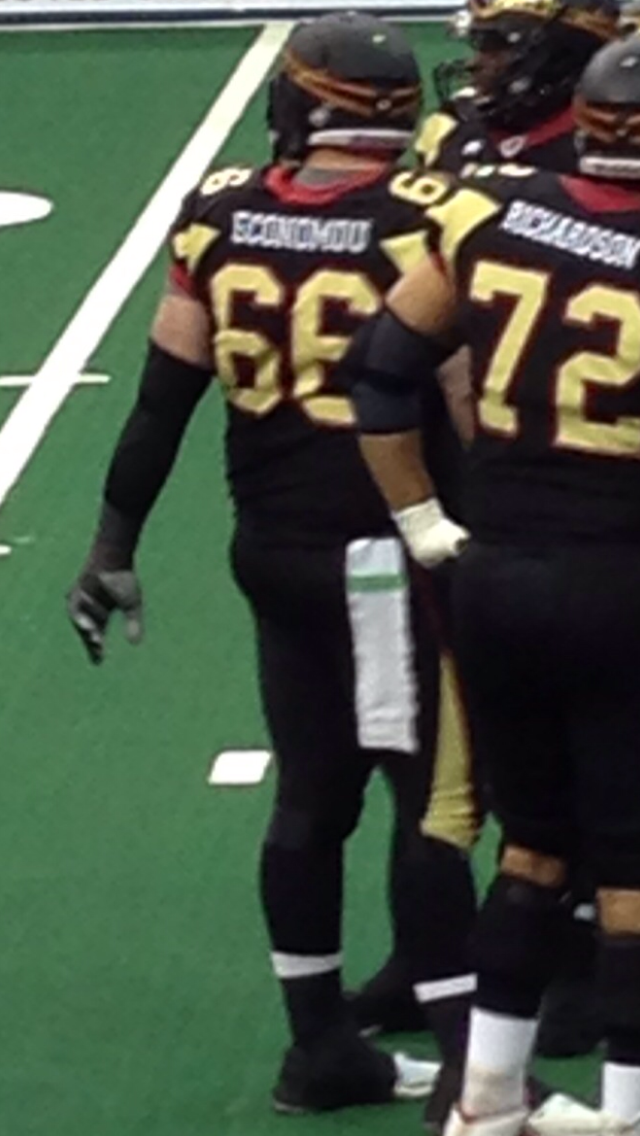
- Economou during a 2013 game

No. 66
- Position: Offensive lineman

Personal information
- Born: December 6, 1988 (age 37); Coram, New York
- Listed height: 6 ft 6 in (1.98 m)
- Listed weight: 335 lb (152 kg)

Career information
- College: Southern Connecticut State
- NFL draft: 2011: undrafted

Career history
- Milwaukee Mustangs (2011); Cleveland Gladiators (2012); Iowa Barnstormers (2013); Hamilton Tiger Cats

Awards and highlights
- 3× All-Northeast-10 Conference; 2× All-Region (2008); 3× All-American; 2× Preseason All-American

Career AFL statistics
- Receptions: 1
- Yards: 12
- Touchdowns: 0
- Stats at ArenaFan.com

James “Flounder” Economou (born December 6, 1988) is an American former football offensive lineman. He is one of Southern Connecticut State University players who entered the AFL in 2010 as a 2009 All-American.

== College career ==
Economou attended Southern Connecticut State University in New Haven, Connecticut. There he was a standout offensive lineman who was named an All-American, All-Region and All-Conference player. He was a starter at guard, helping lead the offense to rank second in the league in rushing and passing yards per game, and first in scoring and total offense.

== Professional career ==
=== Pre-draft ===
Prior to the 2011 NFL draft, Economou was projected to be undrafted by NFLDraftScout.com. He was rated as the 129th-best offensive lineman in the draft. He was not invited to the NFL Scouting Combine, he posted the following numbers during his pro-day workouts at Fordham University:

Pre-draft measurables
Height	Weight	40-yard dash	10-yard split	20-yard split	20-yard shuttle	Three-cone drill	Vertical jump	Broad jump	Bench press
6 ft 4 in (1.93 m)	342 lb (155 kg)	5.57 s	2.01 s	3.23 s	-- s	-- s	29 in (0.74 m)	8 ft 8 in (2.64 m)	24 reps
All values from 2011 Fordham Pro Day

=== Milwaukee Mustangs ===
After going undrafted in the 2011 NFL draft, Economou signed with the Milwaukee Mustangs of the Arena Football League.

=== Cleveland Gladiators ===
Economou was with the Cleveland Gladiators in 2012.

=== Iowa Barnstormers ===
Economou has re-signed with the Iowa Barnstormers for the 2013 season.
