= Pam Reed =

American ultrarunner (born 1961)

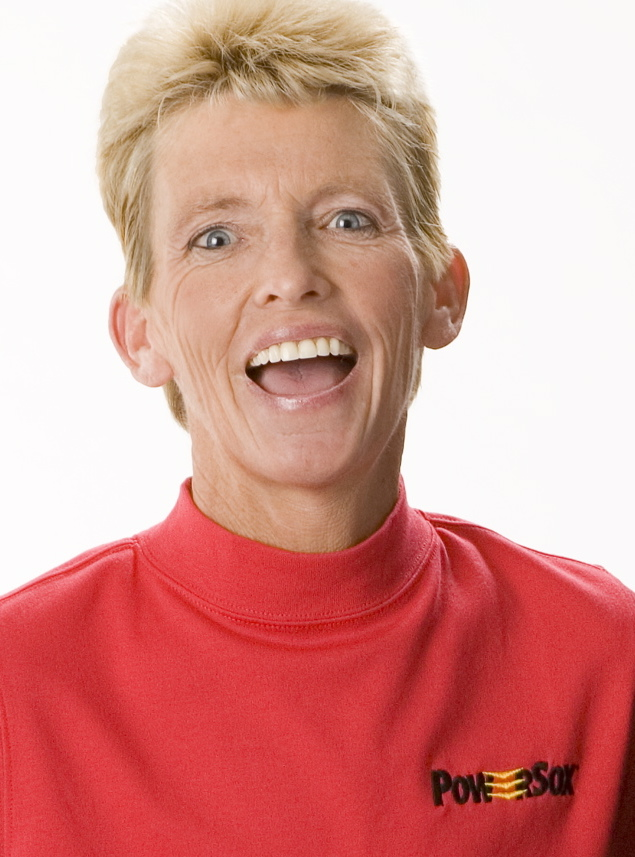
Pam Reed

Pamela J. Reed (born February 27, 1961, in Palmer, Michigan, United States) is an American ultrarunner who resides in Tucson, Arizona and Jackson, Wyoming.

== Running career ==
In 2002, Reed was the first woman to become the overall winner of the Badwater Ultramarathon. Her win also set a women’s course record at the time. She subsequently repeated as overall winner of the race in 2003.

In 2003, she set a 24-hour American record at the time by running 138.96 miles in San Diego, California.

In 2009, she set a 6-day American road record of 788.579 km, but the performance was not ratified.

In 2021, she completed her 100th 100-miler.

In 2023, she finished Western States Endurance Run, Badwater Ultramarathon, and Hardrock Hundred Mile Endurance Run in under a month.

== Honors ==
In 2003, United States of America Track and Field named Reed as the Women’s Masters Ultrarunner of the year.

In 2017, Reed was inducted into the Pima County Sports Hall of Fame.

In 2019, she was inducted into the Arizona Runner’s Hall of Fame.

In 2022, she was inducted into the American Ultrarunning Hall of Fame.

== Writing ==
Reed is the author of the book The Extra Mile: One Woman's Personal Journey to Ultra-Running Greatness, published by Rodale, Inc. in 2006 (ISBN 1-59486-415-2).
