= Believe 208: Run for the Brave and Finest =

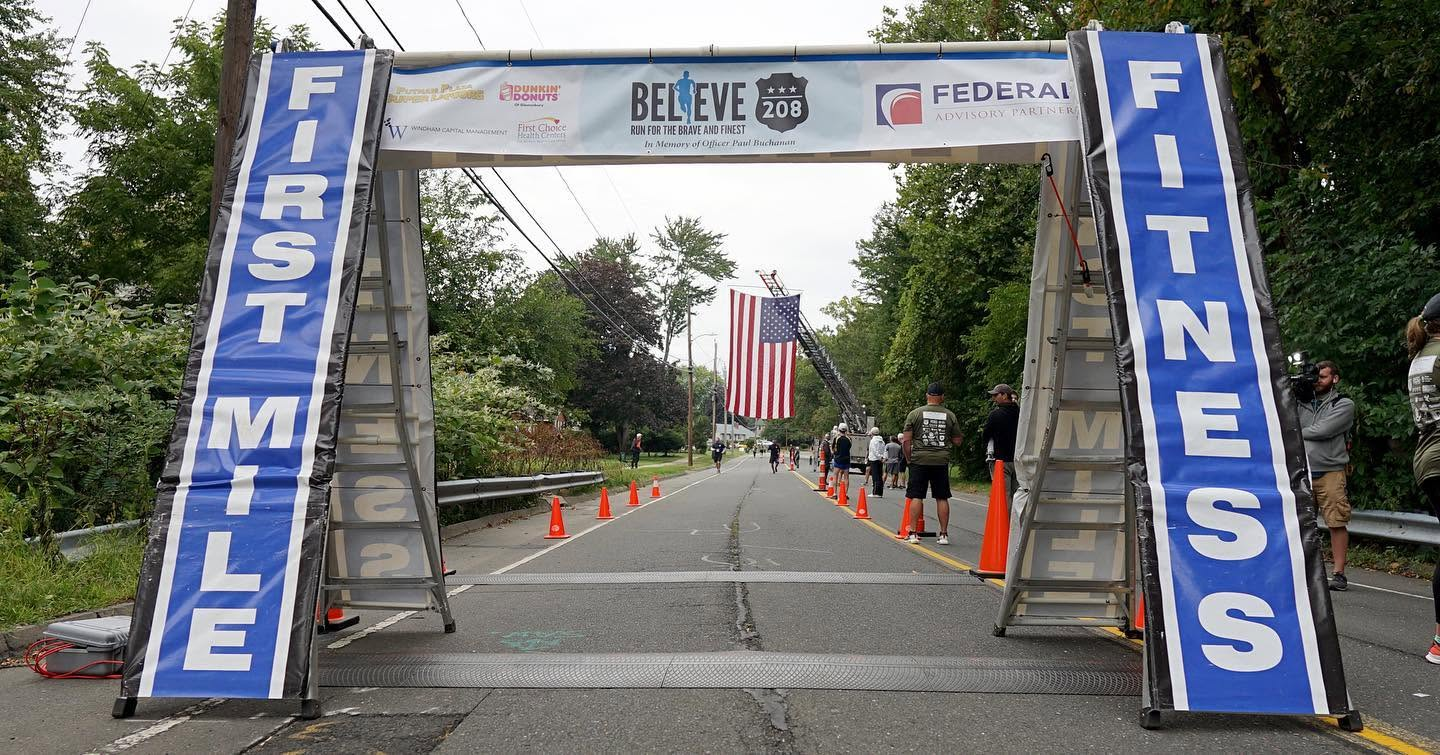
- Date: September 2027
- Location: East Hartford, Connecticut, United States
- Event type: Road
- Distance: 5K (3.1 miles)
- Established: 2013

Believe 208: Run for the Brave and Finest is an annual 5-kilometer road race conducted in East Hartford, Connecticut, United States. The event remembers those who died by suicide. The primary objective of the race is to raise awareness and obtain funding for mental health initiatives geared towards first responders, specifically through the Project B.L.U.E. 208 program organized by the Connecticut Alliance to Benefit Law Enforcement (CABLE).

== Purpose and mission ==
The race was established by Trish Buchanan in 2013 to honor Officer Paul Buchanan of the East Hartford Police Department. His death inspired a movement to confront the stigma surrounding mental health in law enforcement, symbolized by his badge number, 208.

The race aims to support Believe 208, an initiative developed in collaboration with the Connecticut Alliance to Benefit Law Enforcement (CABLE). Believe 208's primary objective is to enhance awareness regarding the challenges encountered by first responders, educate law enforcement personnel and their families, and provide essential resources that promote mental well-being. The proceeds generated from the race are allocated to training, outreach, and support services for first responders and their families.

== Medallist ==
=== Men's individual ===
| Year | Gold | | Silver | | Bronze | |
|---|---|---|---|---|---|---|
| 2014 | Jared Buchanan (USA) | 0:19:28.0 | Chris Yarsawich (USA) | 0:19:30.0 | Jason Earl (USA) | 0:19:59.0 |
| 2015 | Jared Buchanan (USA) | 0:18:55.4 | Josh Pasay (USA) | 0:19:05.5 | Andrew Herzog (USA) | 0:19:44.8 |
| 2016 | Jared Buchanan (USA) | 0:18:18.7 | Andrew Herzog (USA) | 0:18:41.5 | Michael Alquist (USA) | 0:18:58.7 |
| 2017 | Matt Woodward (USA) | 0:19:07.4 | Jared Buchanan (USA) | 0:19:07.9 | Michael Alquist (USA) | 0:19:34.2 |
| 2018 | Jeremiah Cislak (USA) | 0:17:25.9 | Jared Buchanan (USA) | 0:18:24.0 | Andrew Herzog (USA) | 0:18:31.7 |
| 2019 | Weston Labrecque (USA) | 0:17:30.1 | Jared Burchell (USA) | 0:17:34.0 | Calvin Reynoso (USA) | 0:17:58.8 |
| 2021 | Jared Buchanan (USA) | 0:18:35.0 | Matthew Woodward (USA) | 0:18:50.0 | Quinn Handler (USA) | 0:19:04.0 |
| 2022 | Stephen Fengler (USA) | 0:16:08.0 | Matthew Woodward (USA) | 0:17:48.0 | Jeremiah Cislak (USA) | 0:17:53.0 |
| 2023 | Chris Boyle (USA) | 17:48.04 | Douglas Pearse (USA) | 17:55.06 | Josh Pasail (USA) | 18:18.04 |
| 2024 | Douglas Pearse (USA) | 17:56.02 | Jeremiah Cislak (USA) | 18:04.06 | Patrick Turek (USA) | 19:15.08 |
| 2025 | Douglas Pearse (USA) | 0:17:27.0 | Chris Boyle (USA) | 17:57.02 | Sam Chiovitti (USA) | 19:47.01 |

=== Women's individual ===
| Year | Gold | | Silver | | Bronze | |
|---|---|---|---|---|---|---|
| 2014 | Sarah Simmons (USA) | 0:21:34.0 | Dianna Hyland (USA) | 0:22:55.0 | Emily Miele (USA) | 0:23:24.0 |
| 2015 | Christina Williams (USA) | 0:21:53.2 | Kathleen Ferrucci (USA) | 0:23:12.3 | Tammy Hanson (USA) | 0:23:35.2 |
| 2016 | Christina Williams (USA) | 0:21:46.6 | Rebecca Wise (USA) | 0:22:26.3 | Grace Strauch (USA) | 0:22:48.6 |
| 2017 | Pam Moore (USA) | 0:20:31.6 | Candace Walsh (USA) | 0:22:16.5 | Samantha Moberger (USA) | 0:22:34.9 |
| 2018 | Christina Williams (USA) | 0:21:15.8 | Michelle Hill (USA) | 0:22:21.2 | Bridget Kearney (USA) | 0:22:41.3 |
| 2019 | Kristina Miner (USA) | 0:19:50.0 | Ashley Oï¿½Connell (USA) | 0:22:51.9 | Olivia Zulick (USA) | 0:23:05.0 |
| 2021 | Grace Mitchell (USA) | 0:20:45.0 | Sarah Stoddard (USA) | 0:21:36.0 | Rachel Hartley (USA) | 0:22:25.0 |
| 2022 | Elizabeth Fengler (USA) | 18:28.0 | Samantha Moberger (USA) | 20:11.0 | Kristina Miner (USA) | 21:04.0 |
| 2023 | Hayden Deloy (USA) | 19:06.04 | Erin Lopez (USA) | 19:34.03 | Ashley O'Connell (USA) | 20:17.02 |
| 2024 | Kristina Miner (USA) | 20:07.01 | Sue-Ellen Jobes (USA) | 23:08.05 | Kristina Ar Ld (USA) | 24:19.00 |
| 2025 | Sueellen Jobes (USA) | 21:41.06 | Ashley O'Connell (USA) | 21:59.04 | Hannah D'Amaddio (USA) | 24:02.08 |
