= Meredith Duxbury =

American make-up artist and influencer

- Born: Meredith Duxbury; January 21, 1999 (age 27); England
- Education: Southern Connecticut State University
- Occupations: Makeup artist; model; influencer; YouTuber
- Years active: 2020–present

Instagram information
- Page: meredithduxbury
- Followers: 1.7 million

TikTok information
- Page: meredithduxbury
- Followers: 17.8 million

YouTube information
- Channel: Meredith Duxbury
- Genres: Vlog; makeup; beauty
- Subscribers: 1.44 million
- Views: 1 billion
- Last updated: July 19, 2026

Meredith Duxbury (born January 21, 1999) is an American make-up artist and influencer. She gained notability for her makeup tutorials, beauty advice, and fashion commentary on social media. She was included in Forbes 30 Under 30 and Top 50 Creators list.

Duxbury became known on TikTok for a foundation-application technique that uses about ten pumps of product blended with the hands, and has released two makeup collections with Morphe. She has also modeled in runway shows for Diesel and Gucci.

== Early life and education ==
Duxbury was born in England and grew up in Hadlyme, Connecticut. She is a graduate of Southern Connecticut State University in New Haven. She initially studied biology there with the intention of becoming a physician assistant, and later changed her course of study to business administration and marketing. During her first year of college she started a YouTube channel that reached about 500 followers, which she deleted after an acquaintance called it embarrassing.

== Career ==
Duxbury's career began with creating digital content focused on beauty and lifestyle topics. Her videos often showcase her makeup techniques, which have drawn a mix of admiration and controversy. Through her online presence, she has collaborated with multiple beauty brands and participated in events such as the Armani Privé couture show at Paris Fashion Week in 2023.

Duxbury reached one million TikTok followers in December 2020 and seven million the following month. She originated a trend she called the foundation challenge, and her signature method involves applying about ten pumps of foundation directly to the face with the hands rather than with a brush or sponge. She has said that she began using the technique as a college student because makeup sponges absorbed too much of an expensive foundation.

In 2022, she was signed with United Talent Agency. In 2023, she transitioned and signed with Creative Artists Agency.

In 2022, Morphe made Duxbury the face of its Making You Blush collection, a range of eye shadow palettes, cream and powder blushes and brushes. In 2023, the brand released the Morphe X Meredith Duxbury collection, a limited-edition line of six products sold through Morphe's website and Ulta Beauty; its 35-pan Artistry Palette was designed and developed by Duxbury.

In 2023, e.l.f. named Duxbury the brand ambassador for its O Face satin lipstick. The campaign paired an original song with a shoppable livestream on her TikTok channel and the company's first outdoor advertising, in Chicago and Dallas.

In 2023, she was included in Forbes Top 50 Creators list. Duxbury was also included in Forbes 30 Under 30 list 2025.

Duxbury has also worked as a runway model. She walked in Glenn Martens's fall 2024 show for Diesel during Milan Fashion Week. In May 2026 she was among the models in Gucci's Cruise 2027 show, which the label's creative director Demna staged in Times Square in New York City.

Duxbury's first book, Get Ready with Meredith: Skin, Glam, Fashion, Get Unready with Me, a 240-page beauty guide with a foreword by Charlotte Tilbury, is scheduled for publication by Rizzoli in September 2026.
