= Michele Graglia =

Italian ultramarathon runner

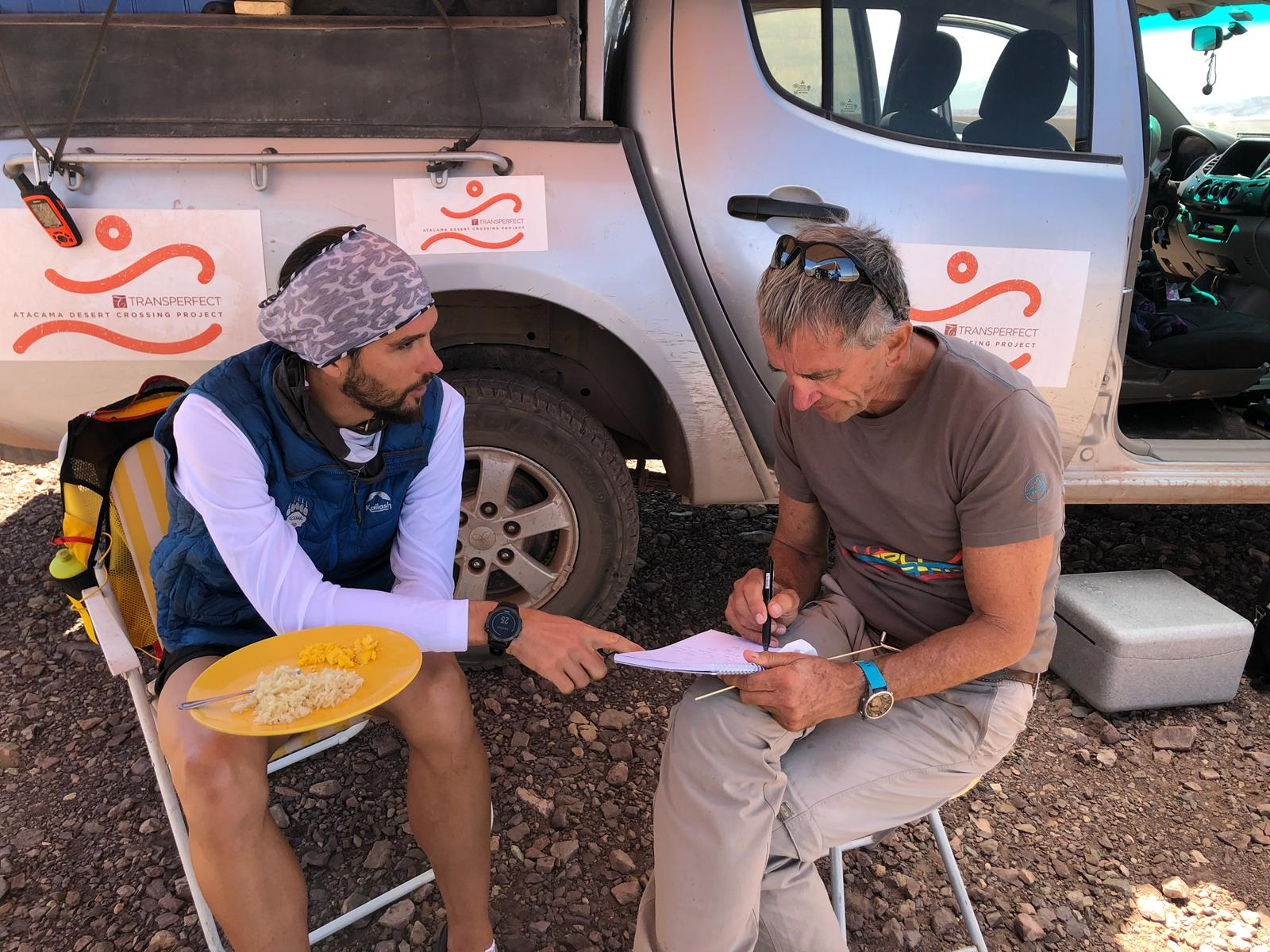
- Graglia (left) sitting with his doctor during a rest spot crossing the Atacama Desert

Personal information
- Citizenship: United States, Italy
- Born: August 30, 1983 (age 42) Sanremo, Italy

Sport
- Country: Italy
- Sport: marathon, ultramarathon

Michele Graglia is a model, author, fitness coach, and ultra marathon runner. His book Ultra was published by Sperling & Kupfer in May 2017. Originally from Taggia, Liguria, Italy, Graglia became an international model represented by Major Model Management in New York and the now defunct Irene Marie Model Management in Miami, FL, where he was initially discovered. He currently lives in Los Angeles, California.

On July 24, 2018, Graglia completed and won the Badwater 135. He finished the race in a time of 24:51:47.

On September 15, 2018, Graglia started the ultramarathon across Chile's Atacama Desert. The translation company TransPerfect sponsored his run. Following the run, Graglia was officially certified as the new Guinness Book World Record holder for the fastest-ever crossing of Chile's Atacama Desert on foot. He accomplished the unprecedented feat in 8 days, 12 hours, and 49 minutes, the equivalent of 2 to 3 marathons per day.

On 11 October 2020, Graglia won the Moab 240 in 61 hours, 43 minutes, and 15 seconds. Graglia took the first place early on in the race and was tightly followed by fellow runner David Goggins until Graglia grew their gap during the second half of the race, at one point, close to 20 miles separated the two. Graglia would end up grabbing the first place, with an advance of almost 1 hour and a half over Goggins who would finish second.
