= Bigfoot 200 =

Ultramarathon in Washington, United States

- Date: Mid August
- Location: Gifford Pinchot National Forest, Washington, USA
- Event type: Ultramarathon trail run
- Distance: Roughly 200-mile (320 km)
- Established: 2015
- Course records: Vernon Palm (male) - 44:57:16; Mika Thewes (female) - 58:21:12
- Website: www.destinationtrailrun.com/bigfoot

The Bigfoot 200 is an annual ultramarathon, held in Washington, United States. The inaugural ultramarathon event was held on August 17, 2015. The course, described as being "notorious among ultrarunners", is around 200 miles (320 km) and ranges around 4,500 feet (1,400 m) in elevation, commencing at Marble Mountain Sno-Park, and passing through the Cascade Mountains, Mount Adams and Mount St. Helens, and culminating at White Pass High School in Randle, Washington.

== History ==
The inaugural ultramarathon event was held on August 17, 2015, and was won by Gavin Woody out of 59 runners in a time of 64:12:35. Vernon Palm set the course record on August 9, 2024, with a time of 44:57:16.

== Course ==
The Bigfoot 200 course, around 200 miles (320 km)s, commences at Marble Mountain Sno-Park in Gifford Pinchot National Forest, with a course that passes through the Cascade Mountains, with a climb of 32,161 feet (9,803 m), Mount Adams and Mount St. Helens. The course has a total elevation gain of about 45,000 feet (14,000 m).

At the start, the runners embark on a steep 2,000-foot (610 m) ascent through old-growth forests and into the stark, volcanic blast zone of the 1980 Mount St. Helens eruption. Navigating boulder fields and lava-strewn terrain, competitors traverse single-track trails, encountering sparse markers and ash dunes before descending to the forested Blue Lake area by mile 12, where streams and gentler paths offer brief respite.

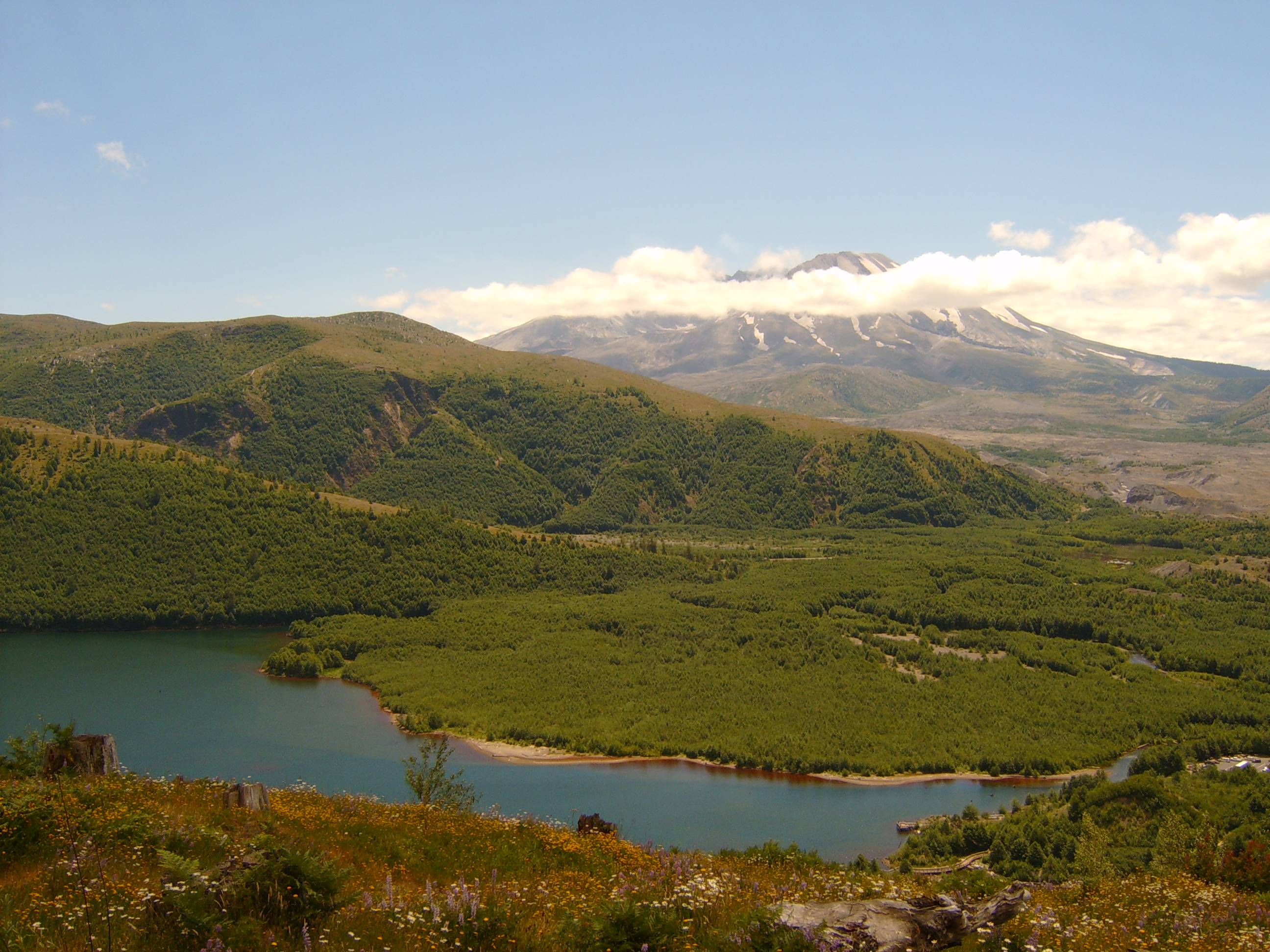
Coldwater Lake with Mount St. Helens in background

The journey continues through the Cascade Mountains, weaving along rugged trails toward Coldwater Lake at mile 45, which has the race’s first sleep station. Pressing onward, runners face a grueling climb to the summit of Mount Margaret, descending swiftly to Norway Pass at mile 63. The course then plunges into deep, misty old-growth forests, crossing streams and with sustained climbs to reach Road 9327 by mile 90.

Beyond, the trail meanders through remote wilderness to Lewis River at mile 108, with relentless elevation shifts and river crossings, before ascending 7,437 feet (2,267 m) from creek to ridge—to Chain of Lakes at mile 142, another vital sleep station. The race persists across high ridgelines with steep drop-offs, leading to Twin Sisters Mountain at mile 178, with views of Mount Rainier. Runners descend to Owen’s Creek at mile 196, and finally Pompey Peak. The concluding 13 miles unfold with a 6-mile gravel road descent into a valley, followed by 7 miles of paved road, culminating at White Pass High School in Randle, Washington.

There are 13 full aid stations en route, with 6 designated as sleep stations.

== Winners ==
- 2015 - Gavin Woody - 64:12:35
- 2016 - Richard Kresser - 62:18:00
- 2017 - Jason Kinsella - 55:49:01
- 2018 - Wes Ritner - 59:54:01
- 2019 - Michael McKnight - 51:33:45
- 2020 - Cancelled
- 2021 - Michael McKnight - 57:58:22
- 2022 - Jovica Spajic - 56:52:02
- 2023 - Ryan Shephard - 54:24:20
- 2024 - Vernon Palm - 44:57:16
- 2025 - Kilian Korth - 45:03:41
