= Southern Connecticut State University =

Public university in New Haven, Connecticut, US

- Former names: New Haven State Normal School (1893–1937); New Haven State Teacher's College (1937–1959); Southern Connecticut State College (1959–1983)
- Motto: Qui transtulit sustinet (Latin)
- Motto in English: "He who transplanted still sustains."
- Type: Public university
- Established: September 11, 1893; 133 years ago
- Parent institution: Connecticut State Colleges & Universities
- Accreditation: NECHE
- Academic affiliations: Space-grant
- Endowment: $46.2 million (2025)
- President: Sandra Bulmer (interim)
- Administrative staff: 403
- Students: 8,155 (spring 2022)
- Undergraduates: 6,242 (spring 2022)
- Postgraduates: 1,913 (spring 2022)
- Location: New Haven, Connecticut, United States; 41°19′57″N 72°56′51″W
- Campus: 168 acres (68 ha); Midsize city
- Newspaper: Southern News
- Colors: Reflex blue and white
- Nickname: Owls
- Sporting affiliations: NCAA Division II – NE-10; ECAC
- Mascot: Otus the Owl
- Website: southernct.edu
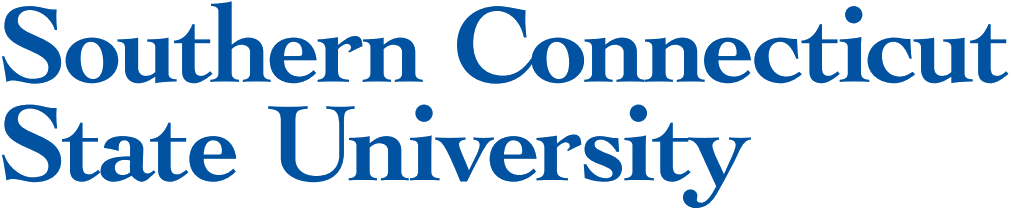

Southern Connecticut State University (Southern Connecticut, Southern Connecticut State, SCSU, or simply "Southern") is a public research university in New Haven, Connecticut, United States. Part of the Connecticut State University System, it was founded in 1893 and is governed by the Connecticut Board of Regents for Higher Education. It is classified among "R2: Doctoral Universities – High research activity" as of 2025.

== History ==
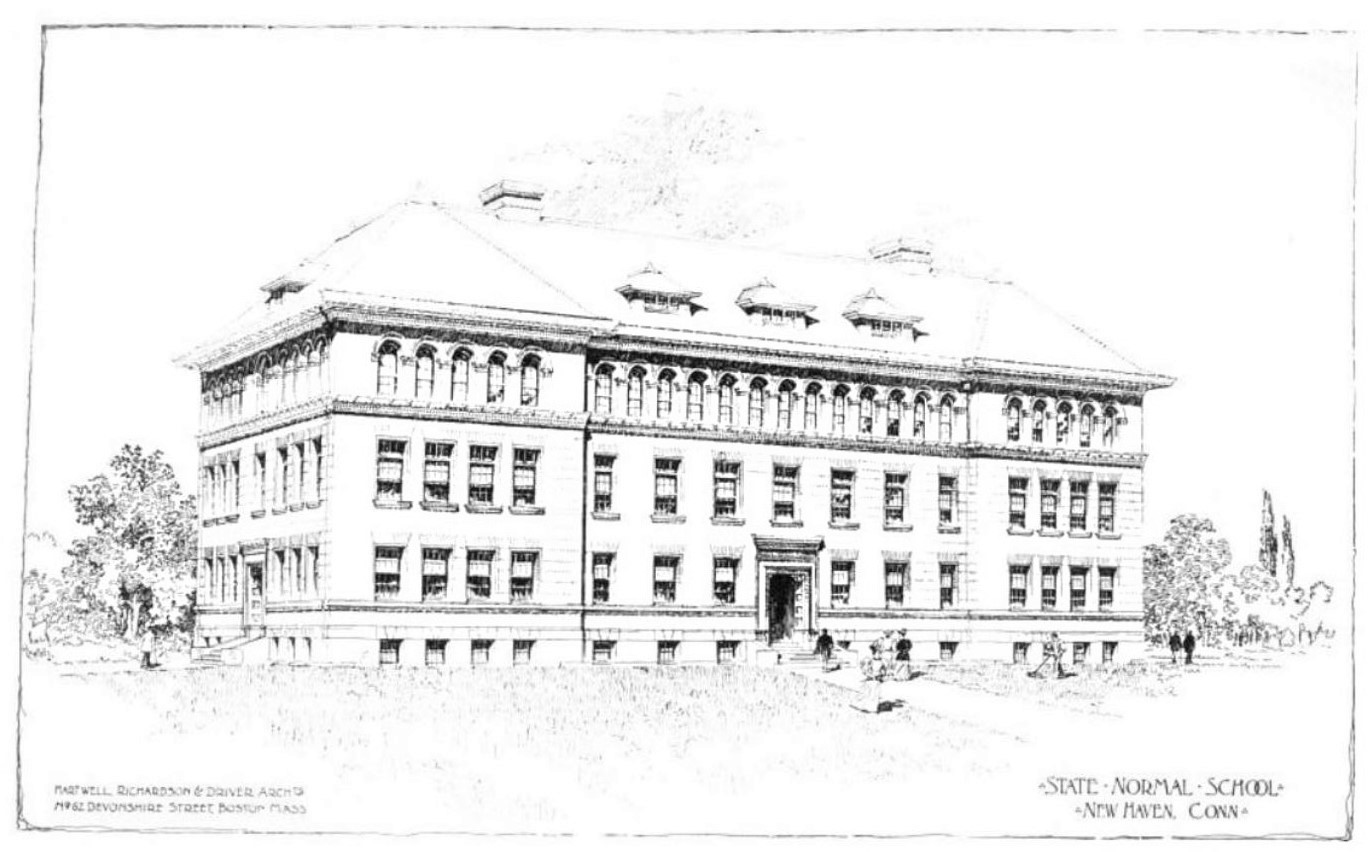
Normal School of New Haven in 1898

On September 11, 1893, "New Haven State Normal School", a two-year teacher training school, was established. The Skinner School, a two-story building, was used as the first campus. It was situated on State Street at the corner of what was then known as Summer Street. Arthur Boothby Morrill served as the first principal of the Normal School from 1893 to 1924. Two female teachers and Morrill made up the faculty. Prospective students had to be at least 16 years of age, and typically had either a three year high school degree or two years teaching experience. There were 85 women in the first class. Tuition was free for students, in-state or out-of-state, as long as a declaration to complete their studies and teach in Connecticut was signed. All textbook materials were provided by the school. Boarding was available for between $3.50 and $4.00 a week, although the majority of the students were from New Haven and commuted.

The Skinner School was soon outgrown by the rapidly growing Normal School. In 1896, it was moved to a new building on Howe and Oak Street This was a better location because of its larger size and its proximity to several elementary schools where students could train. At this point, the Normal School could only award certificates in teaching to graduates.

By 1937 the school was able to grant bachelor's degrees, and thus was renamed "New Haven State Teacher's College". Graduate degrees were offered starting in 1954, a year after the school moved to its current campus on Crescent Street.

New Haven State Teacher's College became "Southern Connecticut State College" in 1959. In March 1983 the school was renamed "Southern Connecticut State University" and made part of the Connecticut State University System.

== Campus ==
Southern has one campus located at 501 Crescent Street, in New Haven, bordering parts of Hamden, Connecticut. Fitch Street separates the academic and residential sections of the campus. As part of an effort to expand on the university's science programs, the laboratory science building was opened in 2015. The four-story building specializes with cancer research, physics and optics, along with other fields of sciences. The School of Business was moved from the renovated former student center to the new building on Wintergreen and Farnham Avenue in Summer 2023. The building is the first building constructed by the State of Connecticut to utilize Net Zero Energy, and houses numerous conference rooms, a community room with seating for 100 people, offices for faculty, trading rooms, a 100-seat auditorium with tiered seating, and numerous study rooms for students.

== Academics ==
Academic rankings

Regional
- U.S. News & World Report: 64

National Program Rankings
Program	Ranking
Nursing	182

=== Teacher Education ===
Southern Connecticut State University remains a center for teacher education. Southern is the only school in Connecticut to offer a master's degree concentration in autism spectrum disorders. The university received approval for its first doctoral program, an Ed.D. in Educational Leadership.

=== Nursing ===
NCLEX passing rates for Southern students hover between 90 and 100 percent in the past three decades.

=== Liberal Education Program ===
The LEP program consists of electives, and is a requirement for all majors. This program is meant to expose students to different types of classes outside of their major. It is broken up into three tiers of classes and accounts for 42 credits of a student's degree. Tier one includes Inquiry 101, Writing 102 and a couple other basic classes that are geared towards Freshmen. It also requires completion of a 200 level language course in any of 10 languages, including American Sign Language. Tier two is broken into 9 categories. Students are required to take one class for each category. The categories include American Experience, Cultural Expression, Creative Drive, Global Awareness, Mind and Body, Natural World I and II, Social Structure, and Time and Place. Tier Three is considered a "Capstone" and only one class is taken. Generally a student's major requires a 300 or 400 level course in the major to complete this capstone. Every major is required to take 3 W or written intensive courses before graduating.

== Student life ==
Undergraduate demographics as of Fall 2023
Race and ethnicity	Total
White	44%
Hispanic	25%
Black	20%
Asian	4%
Two or more races	4%
Unknown	3%
International student	1%
Economic diversity
Low-income (Note: The percentage of students who received an income-based federal Pell grant intended for low-income students.)	42%
Affluent (Note: The percentage of students who are a part of the American middle class at the bare minimum.)	58%

=== Greek life ===
There are many Greek-lettered social organizations on campus. Each organization strives for the betterment of students. Each organization is unique in its make-up, beliefs, and traditions.

Here is a list of the fraternities and sororities that are active or inactive on campus.

Sororities	Fraternities
Alpha Sigma Alpha	Alpha Phi Delta
Delta Phi Epsilon	Iota Phi Theta
Sigma Gamma Rho	Lambda Alpha Upsilon, Latino America Unida, Inc.
Sigma Iota Alpha, Hermandad de Sigma Iota Alpha, Incorporada	Phi Beta Sigma
Zeta Phi Beta	Tau Kappa Epsilon

== Library ==
Southern Connecticut State University's Hilton C. Buley Library was named after Hilton C. Buley, the president of the New Haven State Teachers College which was a former name of the institution, from July 1, 1954, to February 18, 1971. He was an educator and administrator in New York, New Jersey, and Wisconsin prior to earning a doctorate degree from Columbia University. He served as an administrator in the New Hampshire public schools before joining Southern.

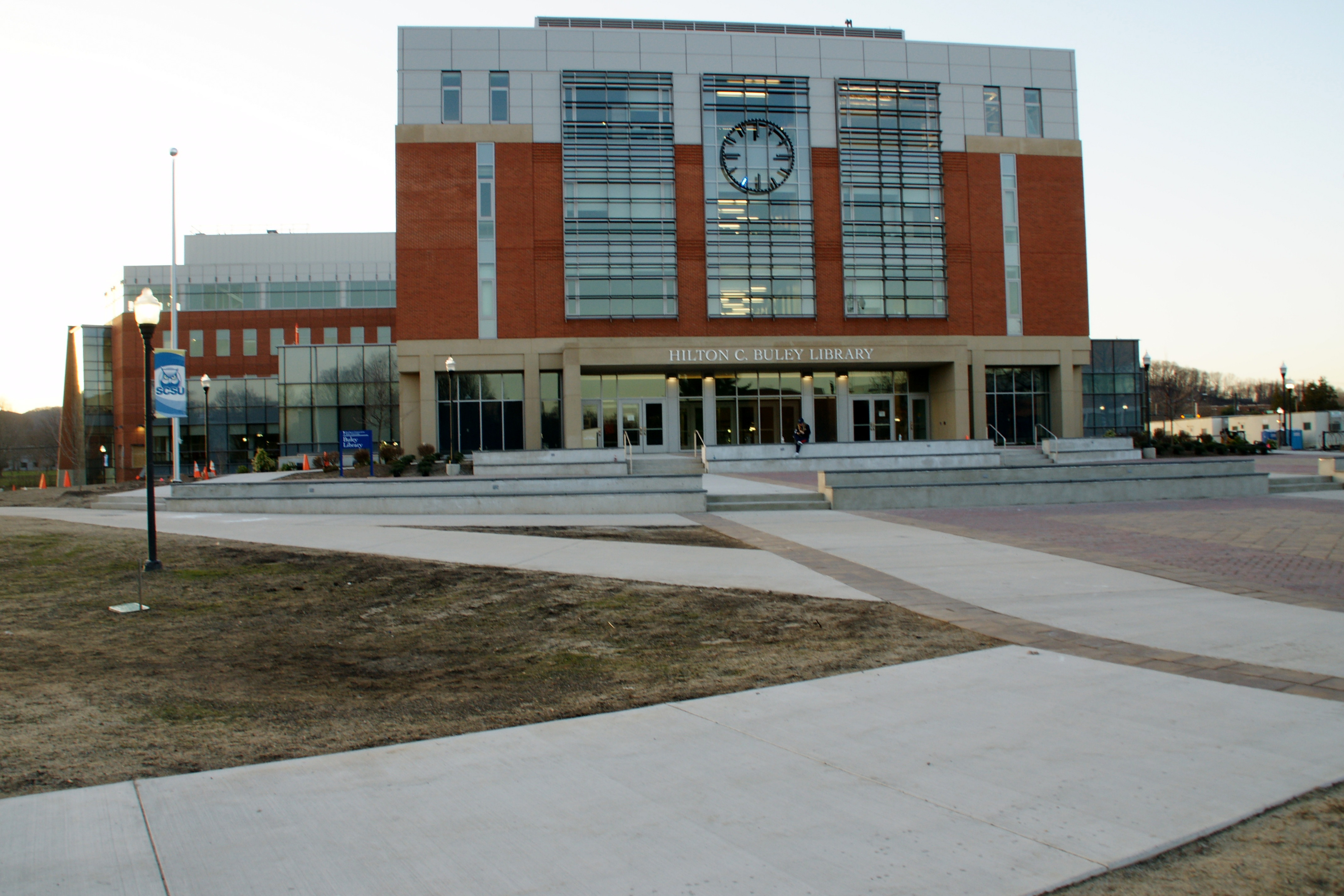
Hilton C. Buley Library

The first library was housed at 2 Howe Street, New Haven, the original home of the university which was then called New Haven Normal School and consisted of a reading room with two walls of wooden bookshelves and a stack area in the balcony on the third wall. When the school opened in 1893, the library contained 500 books. By 1950 a collection of over 28,000 books and 200 periodical subscriptions was crammed into the space which was originally intended for 10,000 volumes. The library's move to the main building on Crescent Street, Engleman Hall, was accomplished in 1954 shortly before Buley came to Southern. By the year 1969 it contained over 200,000 volumes and was outgrowing its space yet again.

The dedication ceremony of a new Hilton C. Buley Library was held on October 31, 1970, a few months prior to the president's retirement. The library could hold up to 500,000 volumes with flexible space that could accommodate an equal number of additional volumes. However, as the library's collections kept growing, space was a major concern. When funding for a new addition and renovation to the existing library was approved by the legislature, a building planning committee was formed in 1999 with a new library building finally opening in March 2014.

The current library features four Tiffany Windows. Louis C. Tiffany (1848–1933), one of America's most talented and renowned artists best known for his work in stained glass, created these beautiful pieces. Three of these, "Angel of Praise", "Water Brooks", and "Hector" are located on the south side of the Learning Commons area just behind the Reference Desk in large boxes to be viewed against natural light. These were donated to the university in the sixties from the First Center Church of Christ in New Haven. A fourth window, the "Congregational window", was donated by the Congregational Church in the 1990s and is currently displayed in the second floor reading room. The windows were installed in the old library in 1972 but just before the building was renovated they were removed, restored by Serpentino Stained Glass Studio, and kept in storage till they were ready to be displayed.

The Water Brooks window (1898–1904) was created in memory of Ezekiel Hayes Trowbridge, a descendant of one of the founders of the Church, and is 54" wide and 98" high. The Hector, which was designed in 1898, is the ship which transported the early colonist to New Haven in 1638. The four corners of the window contain the four meeting houses of the congregation dated 1640, 1670, 1757, and 1814.

Library holdings include the Carolyn Sherwin Bailey's Collection of Children's Literature, Helen Liveten Juvenile Collection, William Cahn Labor Collection, Connecticut Collection, Eula H. Davies Napoleonica Collection, A.H. Gosselin Sound Collection, David Libbey Collection of Library Postcards, Edward G. Levy collection of Nineteenth Century Textbooks and Ephemera, Sherman Reilly Collection of Tracts, and the Artists' Book Collection. The university's digital collections include American Publishers' Binding, 1829–1975; Connecticut Libraries, the newsletter of the Connecticut Library Association; Connecticut Women's Hall of Fame containing samples of ephemera owned by women who belonged to the Hall of Fame; and the Libbey Library Postcard Collection consisting of over 1,400 library postcards donated by Dr. David Libbey, professor emeritus.

== Sustainability ==
On May 30, 2019, Southern officially declared a "Climate Emergency" after recent student advocacy and Faculty from the Department of the Environment, Geography and Marine Sciences advocating for the university to take stronger action in addressing climate change. This makes Southern the first university in the U.S. to make such a declaration.

== Notable alumni ==
- Timothy I. Ahern – U.S. Air Force general
- Tony Amendola – actor
- Kevin Anderson – college soccer coach
- Joe Andruzzi – professional football player
- Lynn Austin – author
- John Ball – professional soccer player
- Brian Bliss – professional soccer player
- Dorinda Keenan Borer – politician
- Jared Buchanan - ultra-marathoner
- Steve Bush – professional football player
- Jacques Cesaire – professional football player
- Robin Comey - politician
- Jerome Cunningham - professional football player
- John DeBrito – professional soccer player
- Warren Doyle – Appalachian Trail hiker, supporter, and speed hiker
- Meredith Duxbury - professional model, makeup artist, and influencer
- James Economou – professional football player
- Anthony Fantano – music critic
- Ancil Farrier – professional soccer player
- Kaliegh Garris – beauty pageant contestant
- Dave Gettleman – professional football general manager
- Ficre Ghebreyesus – painter
- Kevin Gilbride – professional football coach
- Marilyn Giuliano – politician
- Jahana Hayes – politician
- Tim Holt – college and professional football coach
- Chris Houser – professional soccer player
- Cathy Inglese – college basketball coach
- Gilbert Jean-Baptiste – professional soccer player
- Mike Katz – professional bodybuilder and football player
- George Kiefer – college soccer coach
- Brian Lanoue – politician
- Dan Lauria – actor
- James Marshall – author and illustrator
- Bonaventure Maruti – professional soccer player
- Nangolo Mbumba – Namibia's fourth president, politician
- Scott Mersereau – professional football player
- Mary Mushinsky – politician
- Nick Nicolau – college and professional football coach
- Olivier Occéan – professional soccer player
- Andrew Olivieri – professional soccer player
- Bo Oshoniyi – professional soccer player
- Juan Carlos Osorio – professional soccer player
- Paul Oyuga – professional soccer player
- Chris Palmer – professional football coach
- Henry E. Parker – Connecticut State Treasurer (1975–1986)
- Rob Parker – professional television journalist
- Mike Petke – professional soccer player
- Neil Thomas Proto – lawyer, teacher, lecturer, and author
- Ray Reid – college soccer coach
- Jordan Russolillo – professional soccer player
- Hilda Santiago – politician
- John Searles – author, book critic, and magazine editor
- Cristian da Silva – professional soccer player
- Parrish Smith – musician
- Victoria Leigh Soto – teacher, murdered in the Sandy Hook Elementary School shooting
- Erik Stocklin – actor
- Jeff Stoutland – professional football coach
- Andy Talley – college football coach
- Casey Tebo – film producer and director
- Daniel Trust – Rwandan genocide survivor, motivational speaker
- Travis Tucker – professional football player
- Norby Williamson – television executive
- Gary Winfield – politician
