= Marshall Ulrich =

American ultramarathon runner (born 1951)

- Born: July 4, 1951 (age 75)
- Occupations: Athlete, author, inspirational speaker, trainer, guide
- Writing career
- Genre: Non-fiction
- Notable work: Running on Empty

Marshall Ulrich is an American ultramarathon runner and mountaineer. He holds distinctions in several sports: he has completed 124 ultra marathons averaging over 100 miles each, has climbed the tallest summit on each continent (all on first attempts), a feat known as the seven summits, and has finished 12 expedition-length races in adventure racing.

Arguably most famous for his exploits in the Badwater Ultramarathon across Death Valley, Ulrich has finished the race 18 times and crossed Death Valley a record 24 times, including a 586-mile "Badwater Quad", covering the course four times (twice up and back), and a self-contained, unaided solo, in which he pulled all supplies (food, ice, medical) in a cart that weighed more than 200 pounds at the start. He won the Badwater 146-mile race from the Badwater Basin at −282 feet (−86 m) to the summit of Mount Whitney at 14,505 feet (4,421 m) an unprecedented 4 times and still holds the record to the summit. (The race is not run to the summit anymore.) In summer 2012, he and Dave Heckman completed the first-ever trek around the entire perimeter of Death Valley National Park, a total of about 425 miles covered in 16.5 days.

Ulrich has raised over $850,000 for various charities, including the Religious Teachers Filippini, a small order with a major focus on serving children orphaned by AIDS in some of the poorest countries in the world. He provides his services as a speaker, trainer and guides through Dreams in Action, encouraging others to "discover what you're made of: it's more than you think".

In 1992, he had his toenails removed in order to avoid chronic problems he experienced due to the extreme number of miles he was racing and training.

In fall 2008, he attempted to break the world record for a trans-American crossing (currently held by Pete Kostelnick) and completed a 3,063.2-mile run from San Francisco to New York in 52.5 days, equal to 117 marathons, or two marathons plus a 10K each day. Ulrich succeeded in setting new Masters and Grand Masters records and recorded the third-fastest crossing of the United States on foot. The effort, which included many injuries and obstacles, was chronicled in the 2010 movie, Running America. Ulrich's 2011 memoir, Running on Empty, gives more of the backstory of the transcontinental run, tells of his other extreme endurance adventures, and reveals his psychological drivers. Brian Metzler of Running Times called the book "a sincere original" with "candid tales about the loss of his first wife to cancer, his personal challenges of being a parent and rediscovering how to love later in life, as well as overcoming a mountain of self-doubt and insecurity."

== Books ==
- Running on Empty: An Ultramarathoner's Story of Love, Loss and a Record-Setting Run Across America.
- Both Feet on the Ground: Reflections from the Outside

== Movie ==
Kerwin, Kevin (director), Running America. New York: Nehst Studios, 2010.
