= Rachel Entrekin =

American ultramarathon runner

Personal information
- Born: June 17, 1991 (age 35) Birmingham, Alabama, U.S.
- Education: Doctor of Physical Therapy (DPT); University of Alabama at Birmingham
- Occupations: Ultrarunner, physical therapist
- Years active: 2010–present

Sport
- Country: United States
- Sport: Ultramarathon / Trail running
- Team: Norda, Precision Fuel and Hydration

Rachel Entrekin (born June 17, 1991) is an American elite ultramarathon runner and physical therapist, best known for her performances in long-distance trail and mountain racing.

She is the only three-time winner of the Cocodona 250, one of North America's most demanding ultramarathons, and has been nicknamed the "Queen of Cocodona" after consecutive victories in 2024, 2025 and 2026.

In 2026, Entrekin became the first woman to win the Cocodona 250 outright, setting an overall course record of 56 hours, 9 minutes and 48 seconds.

In a May 2026 interview on Welcome To The Party with Abby Wambach and Julie Foudy, Entrekin discussed her Cocodona win, her approach to competition, and referred to herself as a "vibes-based" runner.

At the Ultra-Trail du Mont-Blanc 2026, part of the UTMB World Series Finals held in Chamonix, in August, she finished second behind Blandine L'Hirondel on her debut at the event, completing the course in 22:15:54.

== Early life and career ==
Entrekin was born in Birmingham, Alabama, and began running in college while pursuing a degree in exercise science. She completed her undergraduate degree in 2012 and her doctorate in physical therapy, in 2016, from the University of Alabama at Birmingham.

After running her first half marathon in 2010 and her first marathon in 2011, she continued increasing her race distances. Reflecting on her early move into trail running, Entrekin said that she "just kind of said yes to everything," including "every type of run that every type of person at every type of speed asked me to do."

== Running career ==
Entrekin began running ultramarathons in 2013, initially focusing on the 50K distance.

She moved to Washington State in 2016, and began setting Fastest Known Times (FKTs) on routes including Mount Rainier's Wonderland Trail, Mount Hood's Timberline Trail, and Section J of the Washington Pacific Crest Trail. She holds 15 records for established routes in the Sierra Nevada, the Cascades, the Transverse Ranges, and Catalina Island.

After her first Cocodona 250 victory in 2024, Entrekin won the High Lonesome 100, the Aspen Backcountry Marathon, the Mammoth 200, and the Pass Mountain 50, before winning the Coldwater Hundred outright in January 2026.

Entrekin finished third female and 14th overall at the 2026 Chianti Ultra Trail by UTMB.

In December 2025, Entrekin signed with Norda. She is also sponsored by Precision Fuel and Hydration.

In 2026, she placed second in her debut at the Ultra-Trail du Mont-Blanc.

== 2026 Cocodona 250 "Queen of Cocodona" nickname ==
Entrekin has become closely associated with the Cocodona 250, with race media and sponsor coverage to frame her as the "Queen of Cocodona", because she won the women's race in 2024 and 2025, and in 2026 won the race outright.

The phrase "Queen of Cocodona" appeared in Cocodona race media, a COROS athlete feature titled "Rachel Entrekin: Long Live the Queen", and a podcast episode titled "Rachel Entrekin, Queen of Cocodona 250".

During the 2026 race, Entrekin said that she questioned herself after taking the lead earlier than expected, before reframing the moment with the question, "Why not you?" The phrase became associated with her race strategy and public image after the win, capturing the confidence required to contest the overall race rather than only the women's field. At the finish line, when asked how she felt after more than 56 hours of racing, she replied, "I feel fine." The remark drew attention for its understatement, given the length, sleep deprivation and difficulty of the race, and became part of the media framing around Entrekin's unusually calm racing style.

=== 2026 press coverage ===
The 2026 victory drew unusually broad mainstream coverage for an ultramarathon.

The Guardian reported that Entrekin became the first woman to win Cocodona outright and highlighted that she stopped to pet dogs during the race. BBC Sport reported that she won while sleeping for only 19 minutes and eating foods such as mashed potato. Bloomberg covered the race as a course-record performance. Good Morning America and ABC News described the win as a landmark moment in ultrarunning, emphasizing that she beat the entire men's field. Reuters distributed race images and described her as the first woman to win Cocodona 250 outright.

Coverage also appeared in major newspapers outside the United States.

El País reported that Entrekin won the 253-mile race outright, beat the first man by over an hour and helped place three women in the overall top eight. Spain's AS framed the win as a historic ultratrail result and connected the Cocodona organization's "queen" language to the scale of her achievement. Germany's Bild also reported on her overall win, emphasizing that she defeated all male competitors and ran on minimal sleep.

Specialist running outlets treated the win as one of the major ultrarunning performances of the year.

Runner's World reported that Entrekin's 2026 victory completed three major race goals for women at Cocodona: a woman winning overall, a woman placing in the overall top three and three women finishing in the overall top 10. Outside described the win as a performance defined by joy, relentlessness and Entrekin's return to the finish line to support other runners after completing her own race. Trail Runner published a feature arguing that Entrekin's performance reflected her long preparation, positive approach and increasing use of speedwork. Marathon Handbook published multiple stories on her attempt, victory and race strategy, including articles on her 19 minutes of sleep and her status as the first woman to win the race outright.

=== Awards and recognition ===
Entrekin was named fourth in the 2025 UltraRunning Magazine Ultrarunner of the Year vote.

== Selected wins ==
Year	Race	Location	Distance	Time	Overall place	Notes	Ref.
2017	Perpetua Coast	Yachats, Oregon, United States	50 km	4:58:15	—	Women's winner	
2019	Ultra Fest	Easton, Washington, United States	50 mi	7:18:04	—	Women's winner	
2019	IMTUF 100	Idaho, United States	100 mi	24:04:05	—	Women's winner; course record	
2019	Lookout Mountain	Georgia, United States	50 mi	9:41:26	—	Women's winner	
2020	Jackpot Ultra Running Festival	Henderson, Nevada, United States	24 hours	111 mi	2nd	Women's winner	
2020	Pinhoti	Sylacauga, Alabama, United States	100 mi	22:57:58	12th	Women's winner	
2021	Badger Mountain Challenge	Richland, Washington, United States	100 mi	19:54:44	5th	Women's winner	
2021	Plain 100M/100K Endurance Runs	Plain, Washington, United States	100 mi	27:46:00	1st	Outright winner	
2021	Jackpot Ultra Running Festival	Henderson, Nevada, United States	48 hours	154 mi	2nd	Women's winner	
2022	Jackpot Ultra Running Festival	Henderson, Nevada, United States	24 hours	117 mi	1st	Outright winner	
2022	Antelope Island Buffalo Run	Syracuse, Utah, United States	100 mi	19:58:24	3rd	Women's winner	
2022	Across the Years	Peoria, Arizona, United States	48 hours	188.596 mi	1st	Outright winner	
2023	Jackpot Ultra Running Festival	Henderson, Nevada, United States	48 hours	190.618 mi	2nd	Women's winner	
2023	UTE 100 Mile & 50 Mile	La Sal, Utah, United States	100 mi	25:56:37	3rd	Women's winner	
2023	Plain 100M/100K Endurance Runs	Plain, Washington, United States	100 km	13:42:00	1st	Outright winner	
2023	Rio Del Lago	Granite Bay, California, United States	100 mi	19:16:06	3rd	Women's winner	
2023	Across the Years	Peoria, Arizona, United States	48 hours	212.706 mi	1st	Outright winner	
2024	Cocodona 250	Arizona, United States	250 mi	73:31:25	—	Women's winner	
2024	Crazy Mountain 100	Montana, United States	100 mi	25:06:10	—	Winner	
2024	Across the Years	Arizona, United States	48 hours	212.706 mi	—	Winner	
2025	Badger Mountain Challenge	Washington, United States	100 mi	19:03:42	—	Winner	
2025	Whiskey Basin Trail Runs	Arizona, United States	91 km	9:07:16	—	Winner	
2025	Cocodona 250	Arizona, United States	250 mi	63:50:55	4th	Women's course record; first two-time winner	
2025	High Lonesome 100	Colorado, United States	100 mi	21:56:16	—	Course record	
2025	Aspen Backcountry Marathon	Aspen, Colorado, United States	Marathon	—	—	Winner	
2025	Mammoth 200	California, United States	200 mi	46:50:45	2nd	Winner; second overall	
2025	Pass Mountain	Arizona, United States	50 mi	8:23:30	—	Winner	
2026	Coldwater Hundred	Goodyear, Arizona, United States	100 mi	16:19:17	1st	Outright winner	
2026	Whiskey Basin Trail Runs	Arizona, United States	60 km	5:17:51	2nd	Women's winner	
2026	Chianti Ultra Trail by UTMB	Chianti, Tuscany, Italy	120 km	11:38:13	14th	Third female	
2026	Cocodona 250	Arizona, United States	250 mi	56:09:48	1st	Overall course record; first woman to win outright; third consecutive win	
