= Moab 240 =

Ultramarathon held in Utah

- Date: October
- Location: Moab, Utah, United States
- Event type: Ultramarathon / Trail running
- Distance: 239.66 mi
- Established: 2017
- Course records: 55:49:58, Michael McKnight (2021)
- Website: www.destinationtrailrun.com/moab

The Moab 240 is an annual ultramarathon and trail running race held in Moab, Utah, United States. The race is organized by Destination Trail and forms part of the Triple Crown of 200s, together with the Tahoe 200 race and Bigfoot 200 race.

The race became widely known after its inaugural 2017 edition, when Courtney Dauwalter won the event outright, finishing ahead of all male competitors.

The most recent winner of the Moab 240 Trail Race, which took place in October 2025, was Kilian Korth of Grand Junction, Colorado. The fastest female participant in 2025 (and fifth place, overall) was Rebecca Rick, of Salt Lake City, Utah.

The 2026 Moab 240 Trail Race, which took place from October 9 through October 13, 2026, was called off about 48 hours into the race. Floodwaters in the area caused parts of the course to become too dangerous for participants, causing 70 runners and volunteers to become stranded. This was the first time the event has been called off in its history.

== Course ==
The 2026 Moab 240 course is a 241.8-mile loop that begins and ends in Moab, Utah. The route passes through desert, canyon country, slick rock, mesa terrain, and two mountain ranges near Canyonlands National Park and Arches National Park. The race has an elevation gain of approximately 31,892’ and an elevation loss of about 31,892’. The race has a time limit of 112 hours.

The original 2017 course was listed as 238 miles and had a 112-hour cutoff. Early descriptions characterized the race as a large counterclockwise loop from Moab, heading south within sight of Canyonlands, crossing the Abajo Mountains, moving north through the La Sal Mountains, and returning toward Moab near Arches National Park. The course uses a mixture of trails, four-wheel drive roads, dirt roads, gravel roads and short paved sections.

By the early-2020s, the race was listed as 239.66 miles, with a larger recorded elevation profile and a longer cutoff. The modern course retained the basic single-loop structure around the Moab region while formalizing the route, aid-station system, sleep stations, crew access points and mapping used for a growing field of 200-mile specialists.

== History ==
=== Origins ===
The Moab 240 was founded by race director Candice Burt and Destination Trail, and held its first edition in October 2017. The race was created in honor of ultrarunner Stephen Jones, who had imagined a 200-mile race around Moab before his death in a backcountry skiing accident in 2016.

Burt and Destination Trail had already helped develop the American 200-mile race format through events such as the Tahoe 200 and Bigfoot 200. The Moab 240 extended that format into the desert and mountain landscapes of southeastern Utah, a region associated with Colorado Plateau geology, canyon terrain and high-desert endurance events.

=== Inaugural race and Courtney Dauwalter ===
The first Moab 240 was held from October 13 to 17, 2017. The inaugural race drew major attention when Courtney Dauwalter won the event outright in 57 hours, 55 minutes and 13 seconds, finishing over ten hours ahead of the next runner. GearJunkie described the performance as a decisive overall victory in a 238-mile race, while Trail Runner published a detailed account of how Dauwalter won the race outright.

Dauwalter's performance became one of the defining results in the public recognition of modern ultrarunning. The result was later discussed in Runner's World, Athletes Quarterly, Trail Runner, and on The Joe Rogan Experience.

=== Course development and later editions ===
After the inaugural race, the event became a recurring fixture in the 200-mile ultramarathon calendar. In 2018, Piotr Hercog and Jessica Pekari won the men's and women's races. Michael McKnight won in 2019 and again in 2021, while Michele Graglia won in 2020.

The race's distance and course specifications evolved from the original 238-mile listing to the current 239.66-mile format. The cutoff also shifted from the original 112-hour description to the modern multi-day format of about 117 hours. Coverage from runners and local media described the race as a single-loop route through the Moab and Indian Creek areas, using the combination of desert exposure, mountain weather, technical terrain, sleep deprivation and crew logistics that became characteristic of 200-mile trail races.

In 2023, Sally McRae won the women's race at Moab 240 after completing Cocodona 250, Tahoe 200 and Bigfoot 200 earlier that year. Trail Runner described her Moab win as the culmination of four 200-mile and longer races in one season.

In 2025, Kilian Korth won Moab 240 and completed a sweep of the Triple Crown of 200s after earlier wins at Tahoe 200 and Bigfoot 200.

The longer distance (to 241.8 miles) and shorter time cutoff (limited to 112 hours) has returned for the 2026 Moab 240 race.

== Records ==
The overall course record is held by Michael McKnight, who won the 2021 race in 55:49:58; the women's course record is held by Courtney Dauwalter, who won the inaugural 2017 race outright in 57:55:13.

== Media coverage ==
The Moab 240 has received coverage from local Utah media, specialist ultrarunning publications, podcasts, and broader sports and outdoor outlets. Local coverage in The Times-Independent has described the experience of completing the race through the Moab and Indian Creek area. GearJunkie and Trail Runner covered the 2017 inaugural race because of Courtney Dauwalter's outright win.

Dauwalter's 2017 win gave the race a wider media afterlife. Runner's World later profiled Dauwalter and highlighted the Moab 240 victory as a major part of her emergence in the sport. Athletes Quarterly described the Moab 240 as a mental and physical test across desert, canyons and mountain terrain. On October 24, 2017, Dauwalter appeared on The Joe Rogan Experience, where the episode description identified her as an ultramarathon runner who had recently won the Moab 240 in Utah in under 58 hours.

Specialist running media continued covering the race through later winners and the growth of 200-mile racing. Trail Runner covered Sally McRae's 2023 Moab 240 win and her completion of four 200-mile and longer races in one year. Canadian Running and BroBible covered Kilian Korth's 2025 Moab win and the record-setting Triple Crown of 200s season. Marathon Handbook has covered the race through public-interest race reports, including David Goggins's 2025 finish.

== Winners ==
The overall course record is held by Michael McKnight, who won the 2021 race in 55:49:58; the women's course record is held by Courtney Dauwalter, who won the inaugural 2017 race outright in 57:55:13.

Year	Finishers	Men's winner	Time	Women's winner	Time	Ref.
2017	98	Sean Nakamura	67:50:10	Courtney Dauwalter	57:55:13	
2018	111	Piotr Hercog	60:14:47	Jessica Pekari	77:26:01	
2019	86	Michael McKnight	59:30:12	Sarah Emoto	81:18:41	
2020		Michele Graglia	61:43:15	Jessi Morton-Langehaug	80:09:42	
2021	168	Michael McKnight	55:49:58	Annie Hughes	68:50:02	
2022	167	Jeff Browning	57:27:57	Alyssa Clark	73:12:29	
2023	112	Jesse Haynes	70:47:49	Sally McRae	86:18:33	
2024	129	Max Jolliffe	69:22:17	Sarah Ostaszewski	76:57:52	
2025	150	Kilian Korth	58:45:00	Rebecca Rick	72:12:00	

== See also ==
- Ultramarathon
- Trail running
- Cocodona 250
- Badwater Ultramarathon
- Courtney Dauwalter
- David Goggins
- Moab, Utah
- Arches National Park
- Canyonlands National Park
