= Furnace Creek 508 =

Annual ultramarathon bicycle race in Southern California

The Furnace Creek 508 was an ultramarathon bicycle race that took place annually each October between 1989 and 2013 in Southern California. Its route started in Santa Clarita (25 miles north of Los Angeles), went northeast to Towne Pass and dropped into Death Valley, traversed Death Valley in the southern direction, crossed Mojave Desert and ended at Twentynine Palms. The race was named after the total length of its course (508 miles) and the location of its midpoint (near Furnace Creek).

Rather than use names or numbers as in other races and other sports, the Furnace Creek 508 identified riders and teams with "totems" - animal names said to signify or have a special meaning for a rider or team.

The race was discontinued in 2014 due to a policy change of the Death Valley National Park that prohibited competitive cycling events in the park. Its organizers have since created a new annual event, the "Silver State 508", which keeps the overall format and the total distance of the course, but takes place in Nevada; the event returned to California in 2026, with a new starting point of Borrego Springs.

At 508 miles (818 km) of length and 36,000 feet (11,000 m) of elevation gain, the Furnace Creek route was roughly comparable to four typical mountain stages of Tour de France ridden back-to-back.

Until rule changes in 2003, the Furnace Creek 508 was a qualifying event for the Race Across America.

== Route ==
- Santa Clarita (start)
- Antelope Valley
- California City (82 miles)
- Trona (152 miles)
- Panamint Valley
- Townes Pass
- Furnace Creek (252 miles)
- Death Valley
- Salsberry Pass
- Shoshone (325 miles)
- Baker (382 miles)
- Kelso (416 miles)
- Amboy (450 miles)
- Twentynine Palms (finish)

== Participants and results ==
In 2006, the Furnace Creek 508 had its largest number of entrants, at 179 (75 solo and 104 in teams). In order to be declared an "official finisher", an entrant must have crossed the finishing line within 48 hours (46 hours for relay teams). The official finishing rate was usually around 60% for solo cyclists and approaching 100% for relay teams. The median finishing time was around 36 hours.

Among solo competitors, overall records are 27:15:21 (men) and 28:46:34 (women).

Solo winners
Year	Winner	Home city	Totem	Time
John Marino Open
1983	Michael Secrest	(United States) Scottsdale	-	54:49:00
1984	Rick Bozeat	(United States) San Jose	-	54:09:00
September John Marino Open West
1985	Scott Fortner	(United States) Whittier	-	46:30:00
1986	Robert Fourney	(United States) Evergreen	-	30:05:00
October RAAM Open West
1987	Kirk Freeman	(United States) Newhall	-	34:17:00
1988	Johnny G	(United States) Beverly Hills	-	29:46:00
1989	John Turner	(United States) Norwalk	-	30:59:00
1990	John Stamstad	(United States) Madison	-	30:33:00
1991	Tom Winstrom	(United States) Foster City	-	31:07:22
Furnace Creek 508
1992	Eric House	(United States) Palo Alto	-	29:54:37
1993	John Hughes	(United States) Portola Valley	Hamster	32:24:55
1994	Steve Born	(United States) Ketchum	Beaver	31:09:22
1995	Seana Hogan	(United States) San Jose	Hoopoe	28:46:34 (Note: Course record)
1996	Rainer Klaus	(Germany) Swabia	King Crab	28:09:32
1997	Justin Peschka	(United States) Chandler	Panda	28:42:02
1998	Dan McGehee	(United States) Mesa	Mountain Goat	30:55:50
1999	Justin Peschka	(United States) Chandler	Panda	30:06:25
2000	Andrew Bohannon	(United States) Sunnyvale	Blowfish	31:17:57
2001	Othmar Altmann	(Austria) Villach	Old Fox	31:10:00
2002	Eric Ostendorff	(United States) Torrance	Ostrich	31:14:11
2003	Andrew Bohannon	(United States) Sunnyvale	Blowfish	29:19:18
2004	Marko Baloh	(Slovenia) Ljubljana	Tweety Bird	29:26:25
2005	Kenny Souza	(United States) San Marcos	Fast Truck Gecko	27:15:21
2006	Michael Emde	(United States) Spokane	Alpine Ibex	28:23:21
2007	Michael Emde	(United States) Spokane	Alpine Ibex	27:32:30
2008	Michael Emde	(United States) Spokane	Alpine Ibex	27:28:01
2009	Chris Ragsdale	(United States) Seattle	Ram	29:10:31
2010	Terry Lentz	(United States) Templeton	Chesapeake Bay Retriever	29:19:35
2011	Adam Bickett	(United States) Solana Beach	Rock Rabbit	30:20:28
2012	Sean Cuddihy	(United States) Long Beach	Crow	29:33:10
Trona 353
2013	Billy Edwards	(United States) Boulder	Billy Goat	18:21:00 (Note: Shortened event)
Trona 308
2014	Rich Staley	(United States) Reno	Great Basin Icthyosaur	18:56:00
Silver State 508
2014	Marko Baloh	(Slovenia) Ljubljana	Tweety Bird	26:24:00
2015	Rob Morlock	(United States) Danbury	Muskrat	31:27:30
2016	Adam Bickett	(United States) San Diego	Rock Rabbit	27:54:00
2017	Charles Bell	(United States) Joshua Tree	Chunky Monkey	30:36:00
2018	Mark Gibson	(United States) Irvine	Norwegian Blue	30:15:30
2019	Shane Trotter	(United States) Carson City	Canis Latrans	28:18:04
2020	David Haase	(United States) Fond du Lac	Holstein	32:49:48
2021	Shane Trotter	(United States) Carson City	Great Basin Canis Latrans	26:53:16
2022	Tyler Pearce	(United States) Bass Lake	Space Bear	29:26:00
2023	Meaghan Hackinen	(Canada) Kelowna	Reqiuem Shark	29:43:14
2024	Fabio Silvestri	(Brazil) Uberlândia	Suffolk Punch Horse	31:24:00
The 508
2025	Fabio Silvestri	(Brazil) Uberlândia	Suffolk Punch Horse	33:48:35
