= Rhys Jenkins (runner) =

Welsh ultramarathon runner

Personal information
- Nationality: Welsh
- Born: Cardiff, Wales

Sport
- Country: Wales
- Sport: Athletics
- Event: Ultramarathon

Rhys Jenkins is a Welsh male ultramarathon runner. He held the record for the fastest completion of the Wales Coast Path, from Chester to Chepstow. He is also a goodwill ambassador for the mental toughness fitness brand Rokman.

== Career ==
In 2015, he completed a run of 270 mile route across Death Valley in California, taking a total of 107 hours.

On 10 August 2020, he completed the 870 mile (1400 km) route of the Wales Coast Path in 20 days 10 hours, having started on 21 July 2020 during the COVID-19 pandemic. The previous record was held by James Harcombe of New Zealand who took 20 days, 12 hours and 55 minutes in 2017. Jenkins' time was beaten by Alan Bateson in 2023.
