= Cocodona 250 =

Trail ultramarathon in Arizona

- Date: May
- Location: Arizona
- Event type: Ultramarathon
- Distance: 253.3 miles (407.6 km)
- Primary sponsor: Altra Running
- Established: 2021 (5 years ago)
- Course records: 56:09:49 (2026) (United States) Rachel Entrekin
- Website: www.aravaiparunning.com/cocodona/

The Cocodona 250 is a point-to-point ultramarathon across Arizona, beginning near Black Canyon City and finishing in downtown Flagstaff. The course is listed at 253.3 miles, with 38,791 feet of elevation gain and 33,884 feet of descent, and has a 125-hour cutoff.

The course crosses a broad sequence of Arizona landscapes. It begins in the Sonoran Desert, then moves north through the Bradshaw Mountains, Crown King, Prescott, the Granite Dells, Mingus Mountain, the Verde Valley, Sedona, and the Coconino National Forest before reaching Flagstaff. Near the end of the race, runners use portions of the Arizona Trail and climb over Mount Elden before descending to the finish at Heritage Square in Flagstaff.

Because of its route, the race includes desert heat, mountain weather, night running, sleep deprivation, and large changes in elevation. The 2026 course was described as 45 percent singletrack, 46 percent double-track, and 9 percent pavement. ABC News described the event as one of the most difficult ultramarathons in North America, citing its multi-day format, major elevation gain, desert terrain, and exposure to both heat and cold.

== History ==
The Cocodona 250 was first held in 2021. It was created by Aravaipa Running, the Arizona-based trail running organization led by ultrarunner and race director Jamil Coury. Coury, who has described himself as a fourth-generation Arizonan, developed the race as a long traverse of central and northern Arizona rather than a looped ultramarathon or a course centered on a single mountain area.

Between its inaugural edition in 2021 and the 2025 race, the Cocodona 250 developed from a new 250-mile traverse into one of the most visible long-distance ultramarathons in the United States.

Its growth has been associated with the scale of the course, the density of its aid-station network, live tracking, livestream coverage, and its passage through recognizable Arizona towns and landscapes. The Washington Post described Cocodona as beginning in the Sonoran Desert and moving north through red rocks, pine forests, and mountain ranges, calling it a measuring stick for leading ultrarunners.

Competitive times fell rapidly during the race's first editions. In 2024, Haroldas Subertas won in 59:50:55, while Rachel Entrekin won the women's race in 73:31:25. In 2025, Dan Green set an overall course record of 58:47:18, and Entrekin returned to win the women's race in 63:50:55.

=== 2026 race ===
The 2026 edition brought the race its widest mainstream attention when Rachel Entrekin became the first woman to win the Cocodona 250 outright. Entrekin finished in 56:09:48, setting a new overall course record. Kilian Korth finished second overall and first among men in 57:28:36. Her win was covered by major outlets including The Guardian, CBS News, ABC News, BBC Sport, Bloomberg News, and The Washington Post.

Several reports framed the result as significant for women's endurance sports. Runner's World described Entrekin's performance as a "paradigm shift" and noted that Courtney Dauwalter and Megan Eckert also finished in the overall top ten. ABC News reported that Entrekin adopted the mantra "Why not you? Why not now? Why not try?" during the race and that the 2026 event drew more than 1,300 runners according to Aravaipa Running. BBC Sport reported that Entrekin slept for only 19 minutes during the race and relied on simple food including mashed potatoes. The Guardian emphasized both the competitive result and the informal character of her run, including her stops to pet dogs along the course.

== Winners ==
Year	Men's winner	Nationality	Time (hh:mm:ss)	Women's winner	Nationality	Time (hh:mm:ss)
2026	Kilian Korth	American	57:28:36	Rachel Entrekin	American	56:09:49
2025	Dan Green	American	58:47:18	Rachel Entrekin	American	63:50:55
2024	Haroldas Subertas	Lithuanian	59:50:55	Rachel Entrekin	American	73:31:25
2023	Michael McKnight	American	69:41:31	Sarah Ostaszewski	American	72:50:27
2022	Joe McConaughy	American	59:28:54	Annie Hughes	American	71:10:22
2021	Michael Versteeg	American	72:50:25	Maggie Guterl	American	85:30:38
