= Badwater Ultramarathon =

135-mile run from Death Valley to the slopes of Mount Whitney

Coordinates: 36°13′48.52″N 116°46′02.99″W

The Badwater Ultramarathon is a 135-mile (217 km) ultramarathon race starting at −282 feet (−86 m) below sea level in the Badwater Basin, in California's Death Valley, and ending at an elevation of 8,360 feet (2,550 m) at Whitney Portal, the trailhead to Mount Whitney. It takes place annually in mid-July when the weather is the most extreme and temperatures can reach 130 °F (54 °C) during the day at Badwater Basin.

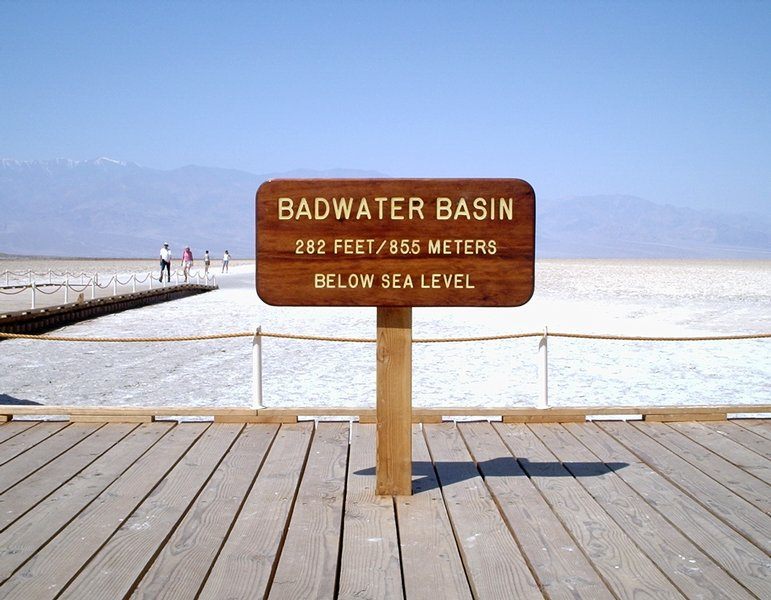
Badwater Basin, California Death Valley

== Course ==
Originally, the run was conceived as being between the lowest and the highest points in the contiguous United States: Badwater, Death Valley −282 feet (−86 m) and Mt. Whitney's summit 14,505 feet (4,421 m). The two are only 80 miles (130 km) apart in a straight line, but the land route between the two points is substantially longer, 146 miles (235 km), because of detours around lake beds and over mountain ranges. Additionally, since the finish line is 11 miles (18 km) from the nearest trailhead, anyone who competes over the 146-mile (235 km) race distance must be capable of a total physical effort of 157 miles (253 km). Due to the two mountain ranges that must be crossed between Badwater and Whitney, the course's cumulative elevation gain exceeds 19,000 feet (5,800 m).

Because the Inyo National Forest requires permission to climb Mt. Whitney and because of the large number of participants, the official course was shortened to end at Whitney Portal. The Badwater-to-Portal course is 135 miles (217 km) long, with 13,000 feet (4,000 m) of cumulative elevation gain. Forest Service regulations do not allow competitive events in the John Muir Wilderness.

== Early history ==
The first hikes across Death Valley of more than 100 miles took place in 1966, starting with Jean Pierre Marquant of France. Hikes between Badwater and Mount Whitney (via the treacherous salt flats in Death Valley) were first made in 1969 by Stan Rodefer and Jim Burnworth of San Diego.

Al Arnold first attempted running the route in 1975 but was pulled off the course after eighteen miles (29 km) with severe dehydration. After vigorous sauna training and desert acclimatization, he attempted the run again in 1975. This time, a knee injury aborted the run at fifty miles. In 1976, training injuries kept him from even beginning his annual attempt on the course.

In 1977 he successfully pioneered running the course, summiting Whitney 84 hours after his start at Badwater. Arnold never returned to the course, except to receive the Badwater Hall of Fame Award.

In 1980, Gary Morris of Marina Del Rey, California attempted to beat Arnold's record. When temperatures hit 120 degrees Fahrenheit, he pulled out and didn't plan to run in 1981. He worked out with Jay Birmingham and Jon Griffin in Marina Del Rey before the attempt and Jay's run from Los Angeles to New York City.

The second Badwater-to-Whitney running was completed in 1981, by Jay Birmingham.

In 1987, the crossing became an official organized footrace. Gill Cornell of Ridgecrest, California ran the 146 miles in 45 hours and 15 minutes, breaking the old record of 56 hours to the top of Whitney. Gill had permits for both Death Valley and Mount Whitney to run his distance. Five other runners competed that year. During the early years of the race, no particular route between Badwater and Whitney was specified and runners attempted various "shortcuts" between the start and finish. Adrian Crane, one of the competitors in the inaugural race, even used cross-country skis to cross the salt-flats at Badwater. In 1988 the race was called the Badwater 146 because the finish line was the summit of Mt. Whitney. Since 1989 the race was shortened and it became Badwater 135 since it was impossible to get enough permits to run the last 11 miles up on national forest lands to the top of Whitney from the Portals. So, the official times were faster and the course shorter.

== Current race ==
Currently, AdventureCORPS manages the annual competitive race from Badwater to Whitney Portal. The field is invitation-only and limited to 100 entrants each year. Demand to participate in the race usually far exceeds available spots. The race, rules, and course have gone through numerous revisions since its inception. Afternoon starts have been discontinued; the use of intravenous fluids now disqualifies a runner. Since 2015, runners have started in waves at 8:00 p.m., 9:30 p.m., and 11:00 p.m.

Course support is not provided. Each runner must arrange for his or her own support crew and vehicle. The crew provides their runner with his or her needs, including water, ice, food, gear, pacing, and first aid.

In the past, runners were allowed sixty hours to complete the course, but this has been changed to a 48-hour course limit and a 28-hour cutoff at Panamint Springs Resort. Finishers receive a belt buckle and medal but no prize money is awarded.

The record for the 146-mile (235 km) race was set in 1991 by Marshall Ulrich: 33 hours and 54 minutes. The male record for the current 135-mile (217 km) course is 20 hours 53 minutes 41 seconds (men), set by Max Jolliffe in 2026. The same year, Carmen Maria Perez set a new women's course record of 21 hours 5 minutes 32 seconds, a second-place finish overall. Due to flooding in the area, the 2023 course was modified from previous years.

In 2002, Pam Reed was the first woman to become the overall winner of the Badwater Ultramarathon. She repeated as overall winner of the race in 2003. In 2002, her win also set the women's course record at the time.

In the last few years, about 90 people have competed in each race, with 20–40% failing to reach the finish line. There have been no fatalities.

The 2020 edition of the race was cancelled due to the COVID-19 pandemic, with all 103 confirmed participants (including 3 alternates) guaranteed entry in 2021 but with no refund or credit of race fees.

== Related events ==
=== Multiple crossings ===
In 1989, Tom Crawford and Richard Benyo completed the first double crossing (which became known as the "Death Valley 300"), running from Badwater to Mount Whitney's summit and back to Badwater again.

In 1994, Scott Weber completed the first Triple Crossing going from the Mount Whitney Summit to Badwater, then returning from Badwater to the Mount Whitney Summit, then going from the Mount Whitney Summit back to Badwater in 10 days. The first leg of the Triple was also done solo unassisted with Weber pushing an unmodified 'baby jogger' cart with his supplies from oasis to oasis spaced from 20 to 30 miles (48 km) apart. Weber completed the majority of the triple unassisted and solo, being met once or twice a day by Ben on the second leg and for 100 miles (160 km) of the third leg. Faced with the necessity of completing the Triple before August ended, Weber abandoned his cart at mile 390 to be fully crewed by Denise Jones. Completing this Triple and adding the Badwater race from the previous month made Weber the first runner to complete four full crossings of the Badwater-Mount Whitney summit course in a single July–August window. He remains the only runner to have done a multiple crossing with a solo unassisted section of 146 miles (235 km) or greater.

In 2001, Marshall Ulrich was the first runner to complete the "Badwater Quad", consisting of two back-to-back Death Valley 300s for a total of four consecutive Badwater/Whitney transits. He completed the course, a distance in excess of twenty-two marathons, in ten days.

In 2003, Sawyer Manuj became the first Asian-American to complete the Badwater duo.

In 2012, Terry Abrams (54) became the first woman to complete a solo Triple 146 crossing, 438 miles, which includes two summits of Mt. Whitney. She is also the oldest woman to complete the Double, 292 miles.

In 2014, Lisa Smith-Batchen (54) became the first woman to complete the "Badwater Quad", 584 miles in 15 days.

=== Unassisted solo crossings ===
In 1994, Scott Weber became the first runner to cross from the summit of Mount Whitney to Badwater course solo without a crew. He did so by pushing a 'baby-jogger' cart with his supplies going oasis to oasis (20–30 miles [32–48 km] apart). Weber then continued on to complete 2 additional crossing with minimal support until being crewed full-time for the final 45 miles (72 km) of this 438+ mile journey.

=== Unassisted "self-contained" solo crossings ===
In July 1999, Marshall Ulrich became the first runner to complete the 146-mile (235 km) Badwater-to-Summit course without a crew or resupply, denying himself the use of artificial shade or outside aid of any kind. Starting with 225 lb (102 kg) of gear and water loaded in a modified baby jogger, he pushed and pulled the cart to the Whitney trailhead, then continued on to the summit with a pack. He reached Whitney's summit in seventy seven hours and forty six minutes.

In July 2004, Jeff Sauter became the second person to attempt a solo self-contained crossing under Marshall Ulrich's rules, and completed the 135-mile course to Whitney Portal in 72 hours, but succumbed to hypothermia on the way to the summit and failed to finish the 146-mile course.

Ben "Badwater" Jones, the reference authority and person who documents Badwater crossings, documented attempts on his website.

In July 2011, Lisa Bliss became the first woman and second person to complete the 146-mile Badwater-to-Summit course totally self-contained (without crew or resupply of any kind, abiding by the rules set forth in Marshall Ulrich's 1999 unassisted "self-contained" solo crossing). She pushed and pulled a custom-built 3-wheeled cart filled with water and gear that weighed 240 pounds at the start from Badwater to the Whitney trail head, and then continued the remaining 11 miles to the summit with a pack that she carried from the start. She reached the Mt. Whitney summit in 89 hours and 38 minutes. On July 14, 2016, Dusty Hardman became the second woman to complete Badwater 146 in 80 hours and 57 minutes while pushing a modified baby stroller. She pushed the stroller from Badwater Basin to Lone Pine and then carried gear and water to the Whitney Summit from Lone Pine.

In July 2012, "Bogie" Bogdan Dumitrescu made an unsuccessful attempt. In August 2012, Croix Sather got to the Whitney Portal in 64:55 and summited Whitney in 72:55, setting a new record. A subsequent attempt was made by "Bogie" Bogdan Dumitrescu who got to the Whitney Portal in 56:50 and summited Whitney in 70:40. Bogie started on July 8, 2013, at 7:45am, got to the portal at 12:03pm(52:18) and summited Whitney on 7/10/13 at 20:03 in the evening, setting a new time of 60 hours 18 minutes. In 2014 Bogie started on July 1 and had to stop after Townes Pass due to severe dizziness and breathing problems. But he returned two weeks later, and finished with a time of 57 hours 18 minutes.

=== Badwater Solo Ultra 135/146 ===
Through the years, runners of all abilities have completed individual Badwater to Mt. Whitney crossings in the spirit of the early crossings, usually aided by the crew. In 2005, Hugh Murphy initiated an informal gathering known as the Badwater Solo Ultra 135/146. Runners could finish at Whitney Portal (135 mi.), but were encouraged to continue to the summit of Mt. Whitney (146 mi.) Finishers of either distance were presented with a bronze belt buckle. Among the finishers of the 135 mile Badwater Solo in 2005, listed in order of finish time, were Shane Sampson, Juli Aistars, Steve James, Marcia Rassmussen, Jim Hamilton, Maureen Moran, Bo Pheffer, Dharam (Paul) Piplani Barbara Szeprethy and Dave Remington. In 2007, the informal group start was dissolved due to National Park Service permitting regulations. Solo runners continue to complete the course on an individual basis during the months of July and August. The word "solo" is used to designate runners who are not part of the official race. These Solos should not be confused with the unassisted crossings of Ulrich or Weber. In compliance with National Park and Forest Service permitting rules, the Badwater Solo is not a competitive race or an organized event of any kind. In general there are three types of recognized "solos". "Solo badwater" where the runner has a crew. "Solo self supported" or "Solo Oasis to oasis", where the runner does not have a crew but can use/buy/stash water and food. "Solo self contained" where the runner cannot get help and has to carry all food and water (see exact rules established by Marshall Ulrich). Since 2007, Marcia Rasmussen has attempted to award each Solo crossing a buckle for their finish. "Badwater" Ben Jones used to maintain a "Master List" of all Badwater-to-Whitney crossings, including finishers of the official Badwater Ultramarathon and the Badwater Solo.

In 2007, then 19-year-old Ben Eakin – son of Laura Weber and coached and crewed by Scott Weber – completed his first solo crossing, having only finished 2 marathons and 1 50K prior to doing so. Eakin completed the 146 mile solo from Badwater to the summit of Mount Whitney, to become the youngest person to complete the lowest to highest course, as well as the first type-1 diabetic.

In 2005, Barbara Szeprethy, then 24, was the youngest woman to finish the course, 3 times total, in consecutive years.

=== Death Valley Cup ===
Any competitor who completes both the Badwater Ultramarathon and the Furnace Creek 508 bicycle race (also held in Death Valley) during the same calendar year is awarded the Death Valley Cup. In 1996, Marshall Ulrich became the first ever to finish the Death Valley Cup.

Charlie Engle currently holds the Death Valley Cup record, setting it in 2009. That year, he ran Badwater, 25:45:11 (4th place), and Furnace Creek, 33:19:25, (5th place) for a total time of 59:04:36.

=== Badwater World Cup BWWC ===
Badwater World Cup (BWWC) consists of

- Badwater (race in the desert)
- Brazil 135 Ultramarathon (race in the mountains)
- Arrowhead 135 (race in the snow)
- Europe 135

== See also ==
- Running on the Sun: The Badwater 135, a documentary film on the 1999 race
