= Nordic Cross Country Championships =

Annual cross country running competition

- Status: active
- Genre: sports event
- Date: November
- Frequency: annual
- Country: varying
- Inaugurated: November 1997

The Nordic Cross Country Championships is an annual international cross country running competition that is contested between the Nordic countries. The championships are generally held in mid-November and the host nation rotates every year between the Nordic countries.

Established in 1997, the championships comprises four separate races: the men's senior and junior competitions (9 kilometres and 6 km respectively), and a senior and junior competition for women (7.5 km and 4.5 km). The women's senior race was previously the same length as the junior race, but this was modified in 2008. The distances are approximate and vary slightly from year to year depending on the course.

In addition to the individual competitions, each race doubles as a team competition in which the finishing positions of the top three athletes from each country are combined, with the lowest scoring national team winning. At the championships the years 1997-2019 performances of the top four athletes was used for the men's senior team race. After an update in June 2021 of the Rules and Regulations covering the Meetings and Competitions between the Nordic Athletic Federations the finishing positions of the top three athletes also for the men's senior team race is used (article 3.5.8 The sizes of the teams).

== Editions ==
Year	Edition	City	Country	Date
1997	1st	Helsinki	Finland	November
1998	2nd	Ålgård	Norway	November
1999	3rd	Enhörna	Sweden	November
2000	4th	Copenhagen	Denmark	November
2001	5th	Perniö	Finland	November
2002	6th	Geithus	Norway	November
2003	7th	Kvarnsveden	Sweden	9 November
2004	8th	Ejby	Denmark	14 November
2005	9th	Hamina	Finland	12 November
2006	10th	Fredrikstad	Norway	11 November
2007	11th	Södertälje	Sweden	4 November
2008	12th	Copenhagen	Denmark	15 November
2009	13th	Perniö	Finland	7 November
2010	14th	Trondheim	Norway	24 November
2011	15th	Uddevalla	Sweden	12 November
2012	16th	Tårnby	Denmark	11 November
2013	17th	Reykjavík	Iceland	9 November
2014	18th	Vantaa	Finland	8 November
2015	19th	Gothenburg	Sweden	7 November
2016	20th	Kristiansand	Norway	12 November
2017	21st	Middelfart	Denmark	11 November
2018	22nd	Reykjavík	Iceland	10 November
2019	23rd	Vierumäki	Finland	10 November
2020	24th	(Covid-19)		November
2021	25th	Stockholm	Sweden	7 November
2022	26th	Kristiansand	Norway	6 November
2023	27th	Reykjavík	Iceland	5 November

== Past medalists ==
=== Men's senior ===
Year	Individual			Team (points)		
Year	Gold	Silver	Bronze	Gold	Silver	Bronze
1997	Carsten Jørgensen (DEN)	Claes Nyberg (SWE)	Dennis Jensen (DEN)	Denmark (14)	Sweden (39)	Finland (40)
1998	Carsten Jørgensen (DEN)	Claes Nyberg (SWE)	Dennis Jensen (DEN)	Sweden (26)	Denmark (26)	Norway (41)
1999	Klaus Hansen (DEN)	Claes Nyberg (SWE)	Erik Sjöqvist (SWE)	Sweden (18)	Denmark (25)	Finland (44)
2000	Dennis Jensen (DEN)	Erik Sjöqvist (SWE)	Knut Erik Rame (NOR)	Denmark (18)	Sweden (31)	Finland (40)
2001	Jari Matinlauri (FIN)	Claes Nyberg (SWE)	Dennis Jensen (DEN)	Finland (19)	Sweden (33)	Denmark (34)
2002	Jari Matinlauri (FIN)	Claes Nyberg (SWE)	Henrik Skoog (SWE)	Sweden (17)	Finland (21)	Norway (48)
2003	Samuli Vasala (FIN)	Mustafa Mohamed (SWE)	Claes Nyberg (SWE)	Sweden (15)	Finland (31)	Norway (45)
2004	Claes Nyberg (SWE)	Erik Sjöqvist (SWE)	Henrik Skoog (SWE)	Sweden (13)	Denmark (36)	Finland (37)
2005	Henrik Ahnström (SWE)	Øystein Sylta (NOR)	Jussi Utriainen (FIN)	Sweden (24)	Finland (29)	Denmark (37)
2006	Mustafa Mohamed (SWE)	Øystein Sylta (NOR)	Henrik Skoog (SWE)	Sweden (19)	Finland (30)	Norway (35)
2007	Jussi Utriainen (FIN)	Erik Sjöqvist (SWE)	Øystein Sylta (NOR)	Sweden (17)	Finland (34)	Norway (49)
2008	Øystein Sylta (NOR)	Oskar Käck (SWE)	Erik Sjöqvist (SWE)	Sweden (17)	Denmark (33)	Norway (44)
2009	Morten Munkholm (DEN)	Andreas Bueno (DEN)	Henrik Them (DEN)	Denmark (14)	Sweden (28)	Finland (50)
2010	Sondre Nordstad Moen (NOR)	Dabaya Badhaso (NOR)	Mustafa Mohamed (SWE)	Norway (22)	Sweden (30)	Finland (44)
2011	Urige Buta (NOR)	Mikael Ekvall (SWE)	Audun Nordtveit (NOR)	Norway (14)	Sweden (25)	Denmark (43)
2012	Abdi Hakin Ulad (DEN)	Mikael Ekvall (SWE)	Asbjørn Ellefsen Persen (NOR)	Norway (20)	Denmark (26)	Sweden (34)
2013	Abdi Hakin Ulad (DEN)	Ørjan Grönnevig (NOR)	Michael Nielsen (DEN)	Norway (23)	Denmark (24)	Sweden (42)
2014	Hans Kristian Fløystad (NOR)	Alexander Palm (SWE)	Mikael Ekvall (SWE)	Sweden (16)	Norway (22)	Denmark (53)
2015	Olle Walleräng (SWE)	Ole Hesselbjerg (DEN)	David Nilsson (SWE)	Sweden (15)	Denmark (29)	Norway (41)
2016	Ørjan Grønnevig (NOR)	David Nilsson (SWE)	Marius Vedvik (SWE)	Norway (15)	Sweden (32)	Denmark (40)
2017	Napolen Solomon (SWE)	David Nilsson (SWE)	Mikael Ekvall (SWE)	Sweden (13)	Denmark (35)	Norway (35)
2018	Amanuel Gergis (SWE)	Peter Glans (DEN)	David Nilsson (SWE)	Sweden (16)	Denmark (22)	Norway (46)
2019	David Nilsson (SWE)	Hlynur Andrésson (ISL)	Adhanom Abraha (SWE)	Sweden (20)	Norway (34)	Denmark (50)
2021	David Nilsson (SWE)	Bjørnar Lillefosse (NOR)	Oliver Löfqvist (SWE)	Sweden (8)	Norway (21)	Denmark (40)
2022	Mohammadreza Abootorabi (SWE)	Max Peter Bejmer (SWE)	Kasper Fosser (NOR)	Sweden (10)	Norway (14)	Denmark (27)
2023	Even Brøndbo DAHL (NOR)	Jacob BOUTERA (NOR)	Joel Ibler LILLESØ (DEN)	Norway (7)	Denmark (14)	Sweden (27)

=== Men's junior ===
Year	Individual			Team (points)		
Year	Gold	Silver	Bronze	Gold	Silver	Bronze
1997	Jussi Utriainen (FIN)	Ivar Arnesen (NOR)	Mustafa Mohamed (SWE)	Finland (14)	Sweden (25)	Denmark (33)
1998	Johan Bergström (SWE)	Gustav Svedbrant (SWE)	Henrik Ahnström (SWE)	Sweden (6)	Norway (22)	Finland (27)
1999	Gunnar Osmundsen (NOR)	Gustav Svedbrant (SWE)	Henrik Ahnström (SWE)	Sweden (13)	Norway (21)	Finland (24)
2000	Ingemund Askeland (NOR)	Erik Emilsson (SWE)	Jukka Keskisalo (FIN)	Sweden (11)	Norway (15)	Finland (33)
2001	Mats Granström (SWE)	Bjørnar Kristensen (NOR)	Mårten Boström (FIN)	Sweden (14)	Norway (15)	Finland (21)
2002	Mats Granström (SWE)	Mohammed Bashir (DEN)	Matti Räsänen (FIN)	Denmark (14)	Finland (19)	Norway (21)
2003	Tuomas Jokinen (FIN)	Mohammed Bashir (DEN)	Martin Johansson (SWE)	Finland (11)	Denmark (14)	Sweden (25)
2004	Joel Lewis Jonsson (SWE)	Øystein Andersen (NOR)	Thomas Stave Gabrielsen (NOR)	Sweden (12)	Norway (13)	Finland (24)
2005	Tuomas Jokinen (FIN)	Thomas Stave Gabrielsen (NOR)	Kári Steinn Karlsson (ISL)	Sweden (15)	Finland (18)	Norway (21)
2006	Alexander Söderberg (SWE)	Sondre Nordstad Moen (NOR)	Sindre Buraas (NOR)	Sweden (12)	Norway (13)	Denmark (27)
2007	Sondre Nordstad Moen (NOR)	Alexander Söderberg (SWE)	Sindre Buraas (NOR)	Norway (9)	Sweden (13)	Denmark (27)
2008	Sondre Nordstad Moen (NOR)	Sindre Buraas (NOR)	Andreas Åhlwall (SWE)	Norway (8)	Sweden (16)	Denmark (40)
2009	Sondre Nordstad Moen (NOR)	Henrik Ingebrigtsen (NOR)	Anton Danielsson (SWE)	Norway (11)	Sweden (17)	Denmark (18)
2010	Johan Bugge (NOR)	Örjan Rönnevik (NOR)	Napoleon Solomon (SWE)	Norway (7)	Denmark (23)	Sweden (24)
2011	Jeppe Harboe (DEN)	Kristian Blummenfelt (NOR)	Mads Taersböl (DEN)	Denmark (10)	Norway (16)	Sweden (25)
2012	Napoleon Solomon (SWE)	Ferdinand Kvan Edman (NOR)	Jakob Dybdal (DEN)	Norway (14)	Sweden (15)	Denmark (17)
2013	Erik Udø Pedersen (NOR)	Anders Lund Hansen (DEN)	Andreas Johansson (SWE)	Denmark (14)	Sweden (16)	Norway (18)
2014	Kristian Tjørnhom (NOR)	Vidar Johansson (SWE)	Jacob Simonsen (DEN)	Norway (10)	Sweden (18)	Denmark (20)
2015	Jakob Ingebrigtsen (NOR)	Stian Aarvik (NOR)	Suldan Hassan (SWE)	Norway (7)	Denmark (18)	Sweden (21)
2016	Kristian Holm Jensen (NOR)	David Nilsson (SWE)	Simen Halle Haugen (NOR)	Denmark (12)	Norway (12)	Sweden (25)
2017	Simen Halle Haugen (NOR)	Thomas Jefferson Byrkjeland (NOR)	Miguel Palm (SWE)	Norway (7)	Sweden (21)	Denmark (27)
2018	Håkon Stavik (NOR)	Omar Ismail (SWE)	Emil Millan de la Olivá (SWE)	Norway (17)	Sweden (18)	Finland (21)
2019	Håkon Stavik (NOR)	Joel Ibler Lillesø (DEN)	Jonatan Vedvik (NOR)	Norway (11)	Denmark (17)	Sweden (26)
2021	Abdullahi Dahi Rabi (NOR)	Axel Vang Christensen (DEN)	Joel Ibler Lillesø (DEN)	Norway (10)	Denmark (21)	Sweden (27)
2022	Esten Hansen Möllerud Hauen (NOR)	Vebjörn Hovdejord (NOR)	Andreas Fjeld Halvorsen (NOR)	Norway (6)	Sweden (25)	Denmark (32)
2023	Karl Ottfalk (SWE)	Kristian Bråthen Börve (NOR)	Simen Gløgård Stensrud (NOR)	Norway (6)	Sweden (19)	Finland (30)

=== Women's senior ===
Year	Individual			Team (points)		
Year	Gold	Silver	Bronze	Gold	Silver	Bronze
1997	Annemari Sandell (FIN)	Sara Wedlund (SWE)	Annemette Jensen (DEN)	Denmark (12)	Sweden (15)	Finland (?)
1998	Lene Hove (NOR)	Bente Landøy (NOR)	Charlotte Sass Larsen (DEN)	Norway (7)	Sweden (19)	Denmark (23)
1999	Gunhild Halle (NOR)	Hilde Hovdenak (NOR)	Stine Larsen (NOR)	Norway (6)	Finland (16)	Sweden (27)
2000	Gunhild Halle (NOR)	Malin Öhrn (SWE)	Linda Sjöström (SWE)	Sweden (10)	Denmark (20)	Finland (39)
2001	Gunhild Halle (NOR)	Annemari Sandell (FIN)	Malin Öhrn (SWE)	Norway (14)	Sweden (20)	Finland (20)
2002	Dorte Vibjerg (DEN)	Ulla Tuimala (FIN)	Kristin Størmer Steira (NOR)	Finland (13)	Norway (19)	Sweden (25)
2003	Ulla Tuimala (FIN)	Dorte Vibjerg (DEN)	Runa Bostad (NOR)	Sweden (15)	Finland (18)	Denmark (25)
2004	Susanne Wigene (NOR)	Kirsten Melkevik Otterbu (NOR)	Runa Bostad (NOR)	Norway (6)	Sweden (21)	Finland (22)
2005	Louise Mørch (DEN)	Runa Bostad (NOR)	Minna Kauppi (FIN)	Denmark (12)	Norway (15)	Finland (20)
2006	Kirsten Melkevik Otterbu (NOR)	Karolina Höjsgaard (SWE)	Ragnhild Kvarberg (NOR)	Norway (8)	Sweden (14)	Finland (25)
2007	Kirsten Melkevik Otterbu (NOR)	Lisa Blommé (SWE)	Ida Nilsson (SWE)	Sweden (9)	Norway (22)	Finland (23)
2008	Annemari Sandell (FIN)	Kirsten Melkevik Otterbu (NOR)	Ida Nilsson (SWE)	Sweden (13)	Norway (22)	Finland (26)
2009	Ulrika Johansson (SWE)	Karoline Bjerkeli Grøvdal (NOR)	Maria Sig Möller (DEN)	Sweden (11)	Norway (14)	Denmark (29)
2010	Karoline Bjerkeli Grøvdal (NOR)	Kirsten Marathon Melkevik (NOR)	Sandra Eriksson (SWE)	Norway (9)	Finland (21)	Sweden (27)
2011	Tone Hjalmarsen (NOR)	Johanna Lehtinen (FIN)	Kirsten Melkevik (NOR)	Norway (12)	Sweden (18)	Finland (19)
2012	Simone Glad (DEN)	Ulrika Flodin (SWE)	Veronika Blom (NOR)	Norway (13)	Denmark (14)	Sweden (29)
2013	Charlotta Fougberg (SWE)	Inger Liv Bjerkrem Nilsen (NOR)	Simone Glad (DEN)	Sweden (12)	Norway (15)	Denmark (18)
2014	Veronika Blom (NOR)	Simone Glad (DEN)	Janica Mäkelä (FIN)	Finland (14)	Norway (19)	Sweden (23)
2015	Johanna Peiponen (FIN)	Simone Glad (DEN)	Sara Holmgren (SWE)	Finland (18)	Denmark (19)	Sweden (23)
2016	Charlotta Fougberg (SWE)	Camilla Richardsson (FIN)	Annemari Kiekara (FIN)	Sweden (10)	Finland (18)	Norway (22)
2017	Sara Christiansson (SWE)	Camilla Richardsson (FIN)	Maria Larsson (SWE)	Sweden (12)	Norway (20)	Denmark (21)
2018	Anna Emilie Møller (DEN)	Lisa Havell (SWE)	Sara Christiansson (SWE)	Finland (18)	Denmark (19)	Sweden (12)
2019	Anna Emilie Møller (DEN)	Sara Christiansson (SWE)	Maria Sagnes Wågan (NOR)	Norway (15)	Sweden (18)	Denmark (23)
2021	Sara Christiansson (SWE)	Charlotte Andersson (SWE)	Mathilde Theisen (NOR)	Sweden (12)	Finland (18)	Norway (20)
2022	Nathalie Blomqvist (FIN)	Kristine Meinert Röd (NOR)	Hanne Mjöen Maridal (NOR)	Norway (12)	Finland (17)	Denmark (21)
2023	Ina Halle Haugen (NOR)	Hanne Mjøen MARIDAL (NOR)	Juliane Hvid (DEN)	Norway (8)	Sweden (19)	Denmark (21)

=== Women's junior ===
Year	Individual			Team (points)		
Year	Gold	Silver	Bronze	Gold	Silver	Bronze
1997	Susanne Wigene (NOR)	Irina Koistinen (FIN)	Jessica Carlberg (SWE)	Finland (11)	Sweden (16)	Denmark (36)
1998	Minna Myllykoski (FIN)	Tuula Laitinen (FIN)	Minna Nummela (FIN)	Finland (6)	Sweden (15)	Denmark (20)
1999	Minna Myllykoski (FIN)	Ida Nilsson (SWE)	Mia Larsson (SWE)	Finland (10)	Sweden (11)	Denmark (30)
2000	Ida Nilsson (SWE)	Johanna Nilsson (SWE)	Mia Larsson (SWE)	Sweden (6)	Finland (22)	Denmark (30)
2001	Riina Tolonen (FIN)	Elina Lindgren (FIN)	Minna Myllykoski (FIN)	Finland (6)	Sweden (20)	Norway (26)
2002	Elina Lindgren (FIN)	Marte Elden (NOR)	Anna Holm Jørgensen (DEN)	Finland (10)	Norway (17)	Sweden (28)
2003	Anna Holm Jørgensen (DEN)	Jonna Välimaa (FIN)	Kari Anne Myhre (NOR)	Finland (16)	Norway (20)	Sweden (22)
2004	Ingunn Opsal (NOR)	Anna Holm Jørgensen (DEN)	Paula Holma (FIN)	Finland (14)	Denmark (24)	Sweden (27)
2005	Ingunn Opsal (NOR)	Karoline Bjerkeli Grøvdal (NOR)	Anna Holm Jørgensen (DEN)	Norway (8)	Finland (25)	Sweden (29)
2006	Karoline Bjerkeli Grøvdal (NOR)	Suvi Miettinen (FIN)	Anna Holm Jørgensen (DEN)	Norway (11)	Finland (18)	Denmark (20)
2007	Kristine Eikrem Engeset (NOR)	Suvi Miettinen (FIN)	Charlotte Sinclair (SWE)	Finland (13)	Sweden (14)	Norway (19)
2008	Sandra Eriksson (FIN)	Mary Alenbratt (SWE)	Veronika Blom (NOR)	Sweden (14)	Finland (16)	Norway (17)
2009	Saara Nikander (FIN)	Johanna Peiponen (FIN)	Silje Bæra Hørthe (NOR)	Finland (9)	Sweden (20)	Norway (23)
2010	Saara Nikander (FIN)	Anna Segersson (SWE)	Nina Persson (SWE)	Sweden (13)	Finland (15)	Norway (18)
2011	Vivi Rantanen (FIN)	Sarah Lahti (SWE)	Oona Kettunen (FIN)	Finland (11)	Norway (19)	Sweden (20)
2012	Agnes Sjöström (SWE)	Heidi Mårtensson (NOR)	Aníta Hinriksdóttir (ISL)	Sweden (10)	Norway (21)	Finland (30)
2013	Heidi Mårtensson (NOR)	Oona Kettunen (FIN)	Sarah Lahti (SWE)	Finland (17)	Norway (21)	Sweden (23)
2014	Johanna Matintalo (FIN)	Maria Larsen (DEN)	Anna Emilie Møller (DEN)	Denmark (11)	Norway (16)	Finland (26)
2015	Alisa Vainio (FIN)	Anna Emilie Møller (DEN)	Johanna Matintalo (FIN)	Finland (11)	Denmark (11)	Norway (27)
2016	Christine Næss (NOR)	Stine Wangberg (NOR)	JMariann Roe (NOR)	Norway (6)	Denmark (15)	Sweden (36)
2017	Alberte Kjær Pedersen (DEN)	Saija Seppa (FIN)	Anna Mark Helwigh (DEN)	Denmark (9)	Norway (26)	Finland (27)
2018	Moona Korkealaakso (FIN)	Laura Valgreen Petersen (DEN)	Astrid Snäll (FIN)	Finland (15)	Denmark (16)	Norway (23)
2019	Ingeborg Østgård (NOR)	Andrea Modin Engesæth (NOR)	Natalie Blomqvist (FIN)	Norway (8)	Sweden (17)	Finland (26)
2021	Ingeborg Østgård (NOR)	Sofia Thøgersen (DEN)	Ilona Mononen (FIN)	Norway (10)	Sweden (24)	Denmark (24)
2022	Sofia Thøgersen (DEN)	Ingeborg Östgård (NOR)	Ina Hallen Haugen (NOR)	Norway (13)	Sweden (20)	Denmark (21)
2023	Sofia Thøgersen (DEN)	Elsa Sundqvist (SWE)	Majken Larsson (SWE)	Sweden (11)	Norway (17)	Denmark (25)

== See also ==
- European Cross Country Championships
- IAAF World Cross Country Championships
- Nordic Council
