= Mimmi Kotka =

Swedish ultramarathon athlete (born 1981)

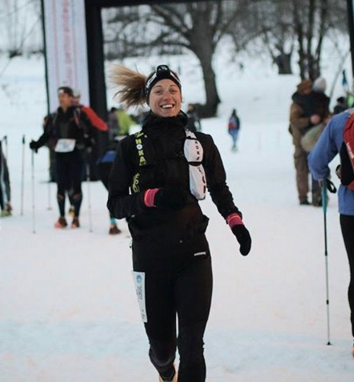
- Mimmi Kotka 2016

Personal information
- Born: 12 July 1981 (age 44)

Sport
- Club: IS Göta
Medal record
Skyrunning
European Championships
Silver medal – second place	2017 Val d’Isère	Ultra

Mimmi Kotka; (born 12 July 1981) is a Swedish athlete who specialized in ultrarunning.

== Running career ==
In a 2016 interview, Kotka talked about her running background: "I have always loved outdoor life and kept active with skiing, biking, hiking, diving, yoga but not running. But in 2010, I signed up to run Lidingöloppet as a challenge and got obsessed with trail running while practicing for it. That was my thing! Then I took it easy in 2012, 2013, and in January 2014, I decided to go all in. Train more focused. It was a little too focused in 2015. I ran a lot and got injured. In 2016, I took it easier, and now I seem to have found a formula that works. It is more fun than ever to run, and my body thrives."

Kotka's major claim to fame is winning the 101 km Ultra-Trail Courmayeur-Champex-Chamonix (CCC) in Chamonix, France, in 2016 by a margin of almost half an hour and the 121 km Ultra-Trail Sur les Traces des Ducs de Savoie (TDS) in the same location, and in 2017, by almost two hours and a half, improving the previous course record from 2015 by 46 minutes.

For some years, Kotka suffered from RED-S relative energy deficiency in sport (RED-S), getting back to normal form at the beginning of 2021.

== Personal life ==
Kotka is Swedish and her father is from Finland. She and her husband, Toni Spasenoski, who is a high-tech project manager and amateur photographer, live in Åre, Sweden.

For a living, Kotka works as a nutritionist. In 2018, she started Moonvalley, an online shop dedicated to organic energy bars and sports drinks, together with fellow athletes Ida Nilsson and Emelie Forsberg.

== Results ==
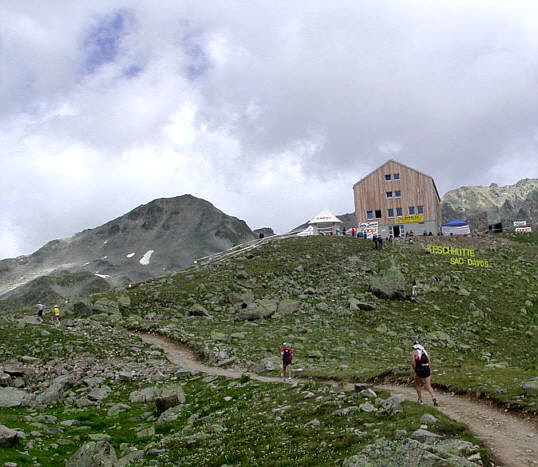
Swiss Alpine Marathon passing the Keschhütte

2010

- 126th Lidingöloppet 30 km (19 mi), Sweden

2011

- 2nd Lidingö Ultra 50 km (31 mi), Sweden
- 13th Swiss Alpine Marathon 79 km (49 mi), Switzerland
- 23rd Lidingöloppet 30 km (19 mi), Sweden

2012

- 2nd Trail des Balcons d'Azur 52 km (32 mi), France
- 5th AXA Fjällmaraton 44 km (27 mi), Sweden

2014

- 2nd Kullamannen Ultra 54 km (34 mi), Sweden
- 3rd AXA Fjällmaraton 44 km (27 mi), Sweden
- 2nd Ultravasan 90 km (56 mi), Sweden
- 1st Coastal Trail Series – Dorset Ultra 44 miles, UK

2015

- 8th IAU Trail WC Annecy 84 km (52 mi), France

2016

- 1st Trail des Balcons d'Azur 52 km (32 mi), France
- 1st Trail du Lac d'Annecy – Marathon Race 43 km (27 mi), France
- 1st Gran Trail Courmayeur 90 km (56 mi), Italy (2nd overall)
- 1st Ultra-Trail Courmayeur-Champex-Chamonix (CCC) 101 km (63 mi), France
- 23rd Limone Extreme Skyrace 27 km (17 mi), Italy

2017

- 1st Run Stockholm 10 km (6.2 mi), Sweden
- 1st Marathon du Mont Blanc 82 km (51 mi), Italy
- 3rd High Trail Vanoise 70 km (43 mi), France
- 1st Swiss Alpine Marathon 47 km (29 mi), Switzerland
- 1st Ultra-Trail Sur les Traces des Ducs de Savoie (TDS) 119 km (74 mi), France (new course record)
- 5th Grand Trail des Templiers 76 km (47 mi), France
- 1st Kullamannen Dubbel-Döden (English: Double Death) 44 km (27 mi), Sweden

2018

- 1st Madeira Island Ultra-Trail 115 km (71 mi), Portugal
- 1st MaXi-Race International – Annecy 116 km (72 mi), France (3rd overall)
- 1st Samoëns Trail Tour - Tour du Giffre 33 km (21 mi), France
- 1st Marathon du Mont Blanc 91 km (57 mi), France (second straight victory on a course that was 9k longer than the previous year)
- 6th, Grand Raid de la Réunion (aka La diagonale des fous) 165 km (103 mi), Réunion, France
- 3rd, Ultra-Trail Cape Town 100 km (62 mi), South Africa

2019

- 1st, UTM Marão 55 km (34 mi), Portugal
- 13th, Madeira Island Ultra-Trail 115 km (71 mi), Portugal
- 1st, La 6000D 65 km (40 mi), France (5th overall)
- 20th, Ultra-Trail du Mont-Blanc (UTMB) 170 km (110 mi), France/Italy/Switzerland
- 2nd, Ultra Pirineu 94 km (58 mi), Spain

2021

- 1st, Quartrail des Alpages 50 km (31 mi), Italy
- 3rd, Lavaredo Ultra Trail 120 km (75 mi), Italy
- 1st, La 6000D 67 km (42 mi), France (second straight victory)
- 3rd, Ultra-Trail du Mont-Blanc (UTMB) 171.5 km (106.6 mi), France/Italy/Switzerland

2022

- 1st, Lavaredo Ultra Trail 120 km (75 mi), Italy
- 2nd, Ultra-Trail Cape Town 100 km (62 mi), South Africa
