= Elov Olsson =

Swedish ultra and long-distance runner

Elov Olsson is a Swedish ultra and long-distance runner born in 1989 competing for Ockelbo SK.

His merits include winning the Swedish championship in 100 km in 2019, 2021 and 2022, Swedish championship in 24 hour running 2025, winning Ultravasan and being the third fastest 100 mile runner of all time, behind only Aleksandr Sorokin and Zach Bitter, with a time of 11:26:19 at the Tunnel Hill 100 Mile race in USA. He has also finished on the podium of races such as Black Canyon Trail, Fjällmaraton 100k and Ultra Trail Cape Town, as well as top 10 placements in the Comrades Marathon, Transgrancanaria, and the IAU World 100 km championships.

Personal Bests
Distance	Result
10000 m	32:23.13
Half-marathon	1:09:58
Marathon	2:26:53
50 km	3:12:56
50 miles	5:24:03
100 km	6:30:14
100 miles	11:26:19
24 hours	284.6 km
