= Albert Kiplagat Matebor =

Kenyan long-distance runner

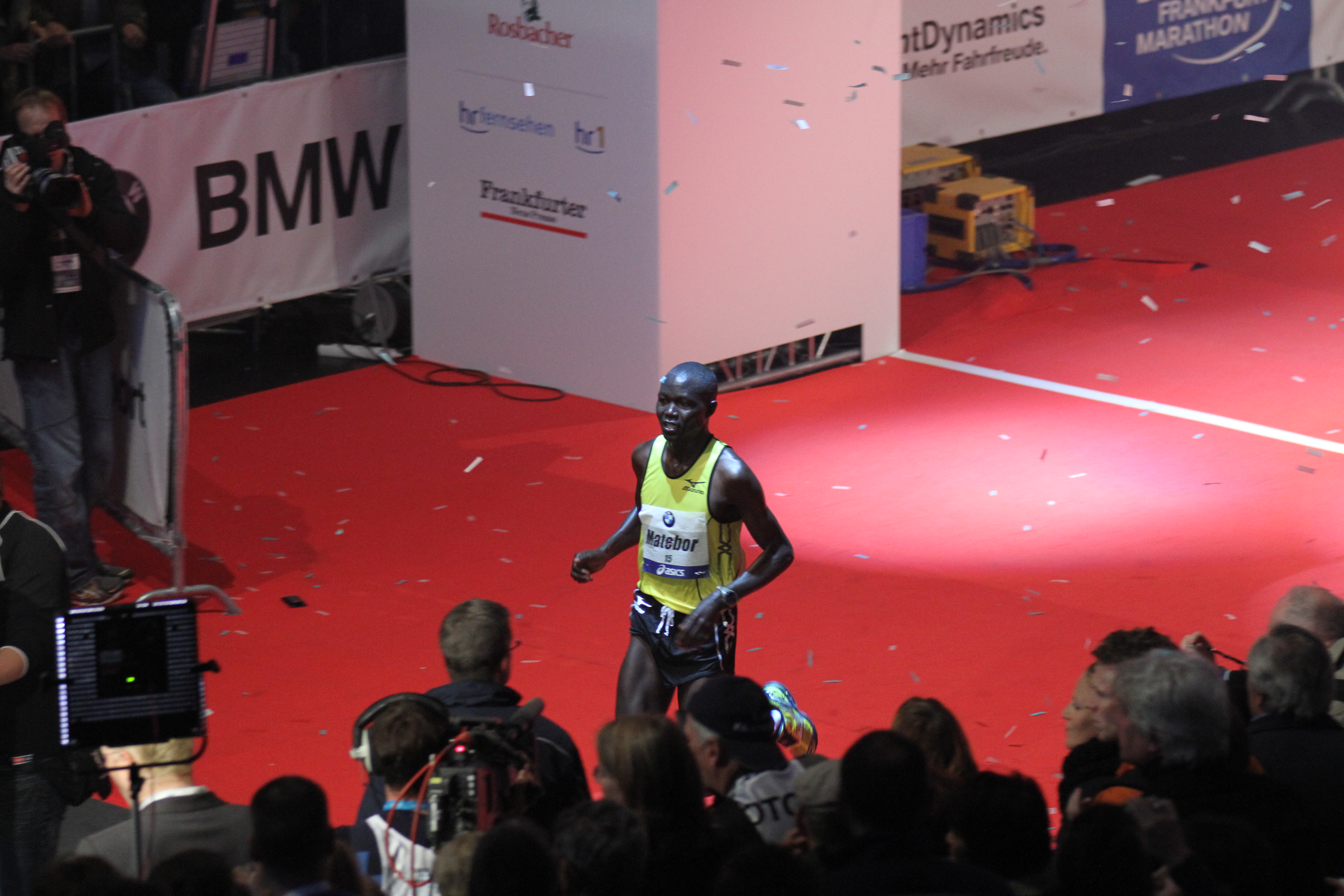
Matebor finishing the 2011 Frankfurt Marathon

Albert Kiplagat Matebor (born 20 December 1980) is a Kenyan long-distance runner who competes in half marathon and marathon races. He has personal bests of 1:00:52 and 2:05:25 hours, respectively, for the events. He has won the Verona Marathon and Göteborgsvarvet.

His best placing at a major race was third at the 2011 Frankfurt Marathon, where he set his personal best and ranked sixth globally. The 2011 season was his career peak and has neither featured in the top three of a major race nor run under two hours and eight minutes since.

== Career ==
Born in Koibatek District in Kenya, he made his marathon debut at the 2005 Milan Marathon, reaching the top ten but finishing some eight minutes behind the winner. At the 2006 Enschede Marathon he placed third with at time of 2:12:21 hours. Later that year he ran at the higher profile Amsterdam Marathon and improved to 2:11:52 hours for sixth place. The following year he made two further outings over the distance, finishing fifth at both the Rome City Marathon and the Frankfurt Marathon and edged near the top 50 runners for the season with a new best of 2:09:33 hours. He also ran in two half marathon races, having a podium finish at the Zwolle Half Marathon before taking sixth at the Lille Half Marathon with a best of 1:01:39 hours.

Matebor failed to register much improvement in the 2008 season, being in the top ten in Amsterdam and the Seoul International Marathon, but failing to break the two hours and eleven minutes mark. He was fifth at the Berlin 25K and in the top ten in the Lille Half Marathon. Similar results followed in 2009 (fifth at the Cologne Marathon and tenth in Rome) He skipped the 2010 season.

He returned an improved runner in 2011. He secured his first victory over the classic distance at the Verona Marathon, his run of 2:09:16 hours being a new personal best. A first place at the Göteborgsvarvet in another best of 60:52 minutes marked his first victory over that distance as well. He followed this with a runner-up finish at the Gold Coast Marathon, then fourth at the Udine Half Marathon. The 2011 Frankfurt Marathon saw Matebor establish himself among the world's elite marathon runners. In a fast race where Wilson Kipsang came close to the world record, Matebor finished third with a time of 2:05:25 hours. This ranked him sixth in the world that year. In 2012 he failed to defend his Göteborgsvarvet title (placing tenth) and was down the field at the Paris Marathon, coming twelfth. He had revived fortunes in the second half of the year, being the runner-up at the Portugal Half Marathon and sixth at the Frankfurt Marathon in a season's best of 2:08:53 hours.

Matebor was among the foremost entrants at the 2013 Prague Marathon, but he missed the podium coming in fourth place. He still performed well in Frankfurt, taking fifth place with a run of 2:08:17 hours – the second best of his career.

He slipped back into the lower ranks of the sport in 2014, taking sixth at both the Rotterdam Marathon and Valencia Marathon and failing to run under two hours and ten minutes. A run of 2:16:36 hours at the Xiamen Marathon in January 2015 marked a new low.
