= Ida Nilsson (runner) =

Swedish long-distance runner (born 1981)

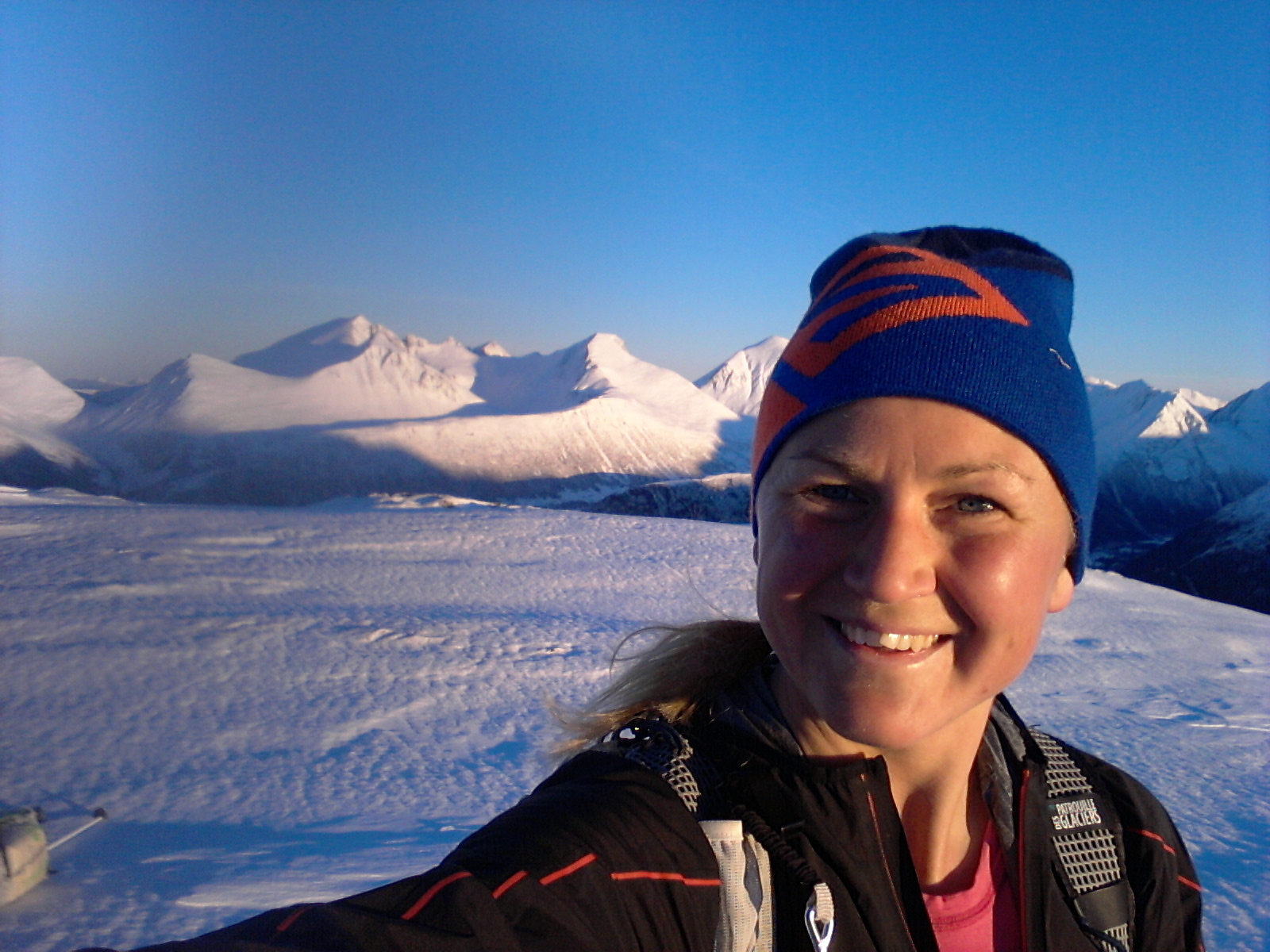
- Ida Nilsson in December 2016

Personal information
- Nationality: Swedish
- Born: 8 February 1981 (age 45)
- Home town: Rauma Municipality, Norway
Medal record
Track and field
NCAA Outdoor Championships
Silver medal – second place	2002	3 000 m steeplechase
Silver medal – second place	2003	3 000 m steeplechase
Gold medal – first place	2004	3 000 m steeplechase
NCAA Indoor Championships
Gold medal – first place	2005	5 000 m
Cross country running
Nordic Championships
Bronze medal – third place	2007	4.6 km
Bronze medal – third place	2008	7.5 km
Trail running
World Championships
Silver medal – second place	2022	80 km

Ida Nilsson (born 8 February 1981) is a Swedish long-distance runner who also competes in ski mountaineering. In 2003 – 2006 she won a total of ten gold medals in Swedish championships in track & field and cross country running, plus two NCAA gold medals. After many years away from training Nilsson won the Swedish championship in ski mountaineering in 2016 and a couple of months later won the prestigious Transvulcania ultramarathon.

== Childhood and youth ==
Nilsson hails from Kalmar in the flat southern Sweden. She grew up in a sports family where both her father Carl-Gustaf "Calle" and mother Katarina competed at an elite level. Two brothers, Marcus and David, and a sister, Johanna, have belonged to the Swedish national team in athletics. At the 2002 Swedish cross country championships the family walked home with four gold medals, one silver and one bronze.

In 2001–2005 Nilsson studied at the Northern Arizona University in Flagstaff, USA. She and her sister, Johanna Nilsson, ran for the Northern Arizona Lumberjacks collegiate team and had much success. Nilsson won the 2004 NCAA collegiate outdoor championships in 3000 m steeplechase and 2005 indoor championships in 5000 m. Nilsson also competed for the Little Rock Trojans track and field team in the NCAA.

The two sisters were both ranked in the top three of a 2014 poll of greatest women's athletes in the Big Sky Conference. Nilsson won four cross country titles in that regional conference. Both were inducted into the Northern Arizona Lumberjacks hall of fame.

== Track and field and cross country ==
=== Top years ===
During the first years of the 21st century Nilsson was the Swedish dominant in 5000 metres and 3000 m steeplechase, then a relatively new sport for women. In 2003, she was awarded the prestigious Stora grabbars och tjejers märke for her sports achievements. She finished seventh in the 3000m steeplechase at the 2006 European Athletics Championships in Gothenburg, where she set the Swedish national record at 9:39.24, a personal best. She also participated in the 2005 World Championships in Athletics in Helsinki. In the summer of 2006 Nilsson ran 3000 m in 9:01.01, the fastest time by a Swedish athlete in more than 10 years. Nilsson's personal best for 5000 m is 15:33.18.

=== Injuries ===
After leaving college in Arizona Nilsson had a series of injuries, including a stress fracture in her hip joint in 2009. The injury didn't fully heal until the summer of 2013, and Nilsson gave up her track & field career. After this she basically didn't run at all for five years.

=== Personal bests ===
The following list is based on information from Nilsson's club Högby IF.

Event	Year	Result
400 m	2000	1:01:81
800 m	2003	2:12:87
1 500 m	2006	4:18:54
3 000 m	2006	9:01:01
5 000 m	2004	15:33:18
Half marathon	2016	01:18:22
3 000 m steeplechase	2006	9:39:24

Nilsson has never run an official 10 000 m on a track; her best similar performance is 35:03 in a 2016 road race.

== Mountain running and ski mountaineering ==
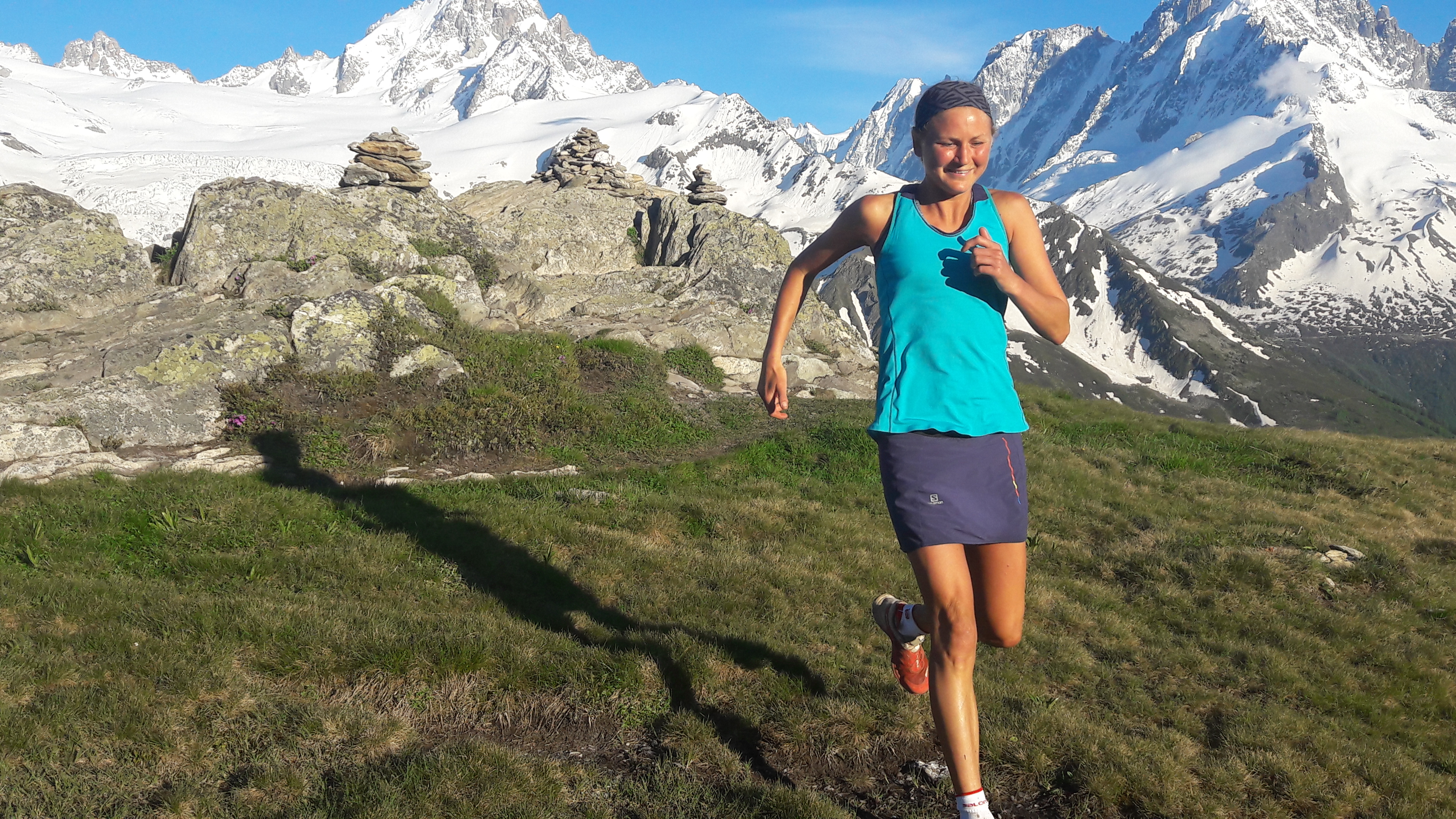
Chamonix 2016

After many years of serious injuries Nilsson was finally able to run again in 2013. Nilsson: "Now even my body feels better than 10-15 years ago. Now I feel like young again." In 2015 Nilsson won the Swedish mountain marathon Fjällmaraton. Later the same year, in her ultramarathon debut, she placed second in the 90-kilometer Ultravasan in Sweden. In early 2016 she became ski mountaineering Swedish champion at Keb Classic (with Jenny Råghall) and won the Transvulcania mountain ultramarathon in the Canary Islands.

Nilsson, who during her track & field career seldom ran as far as 10 km (6.2 mi), now competed in a number of longer races. In 2016 and again in 2017 she became Swedish road running champion in the masters athletics class for women 35 years. In the summer of 2016 Nilsson won the Marathon du Mont Blanc in Chamonix, France, proving that the unexpected Transvulcania win was not a fluke and planting Nilsson firmly in the world elite.

During the winter 2015 – 2016 Nilsson lived in Chamonix, France, and trained ski mountaineering with Emelie Forsberg. According to Nilsson it was Forsberg who inspired her to test more ultratrail. In running events Nilsson competes for Högby IF in Sweden, Måndalen IL in Norway and Salomon Running internationally. In ski mountaineering her club affiliation is Fjällframfart in Swedish events.

Nilsson has trained as a cook, a wilderness and adventure guide and as masseur. For a living she has run a small company registered in 2015 as a sole proprietorship called Running soul – Ida Nilsson, that according to the Facebook site with the same name offered "massage, sports massage, yoga classes, workshops and training camps for runners". As of 2018 Nilsson lives in Måndalen in Rauma Municipality in the Norwegian county Møre og Romsdal, and makes a living from skyrunning and ski mountaineering. In 2018 Nilsson together with fellow athletes Emelie Forsberg and Mimmi Kotka started Moonvalley, an on-line shop dedicated to organic energy bars and sportsdrinks.

== Results ==
=== Cross country and sky running ===
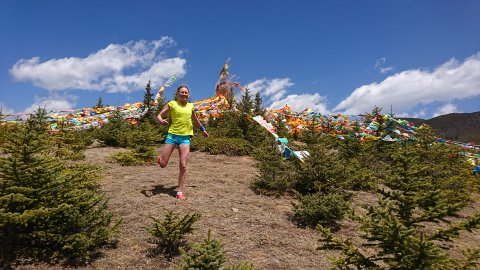
Shangri-La 2017

The following list includes only results after Nilsson's comeback after her five-year injury period. A fair number of the races, in particular in her native country Sweden, are asphalt races or otherwise not strictly cross country or mountain running.

2014

- 1st, Spring en mil vinn en bil 10 km (6.2 mi), Sweden

2015

- 2nd, Kungsholmen Runt 10 km (6.2 mi), Sweden
- 2nd, Spring en mil vinn en bil 10 km (6.2 mi), Sweden
- 1st, Böda Beach run 10 km (6.2 mi), Sweden
- 2nd, Malkars halvmara 21 km (13 mi), Sweden
- 1st, Hornindal runt 38 km (24 mi), Norway
- 3rd, Vetenløpet VK, Norway
- 1st, Victorialoppet 9 km (5.6 mi), Sweden
- 1st, Hornsjön Runt 11 km (6.8 mi), Sweden
- 6th, Peak Performance Vertical K, Sweden
- 1st, Fjällmaraton 44 km (27 mi), Sweden
- 1st, Salomon Trail Tour Järvsö 21 km (13 mi), Sweden
- 2nd, Ultravasan 90 km (56 mi), Sweden
- 2nd, Lidingöloppet 30 km (19 mi), Sweden
- 1st, Salomon Trail Tour Sälen, Sweden 21 km (13 mi), Sweden

2016

- 1st, Nordic Classic Running 21 km (13 mi), Sweden
- 1st, Salomon City Trail 14 km (8.7 mi), Sweden
- 1st, Transvulcania 73 km (45 mi), Spain
- 15th, Göteborgsvarvet 21 km (13 mi), Sweden (Note: The race was also Swedish championship in half marathon, in which Nilsson placed 5th with the time 01:18:22) (personal best for the half marathon distance)
- 1st, Mönsterås Stadslopp 10 km (6.2 mi), Sweden
- 3rd, Sthlm 10 10 km (6.2 mi), Sweden (also Swedish championship in road running, won the masters athletics class for women 35 years, personal best for the 10 km road running distance)
- 1st, Öland Ultra 51 km (32 mi), Sweden
- 6th, Marathon du Mont Blanc Vertical km, France
- 1st, Marathon du Mont Blanc 42 km (26 mi), France
- 1st, Böda Beach run 10 km (6.2 mi), Sweden (2nd straight victory)
- 10th, Dolomites Sky Race, 22 km, Italy
- 4th, Buff Epic Trail 42 km (26 mi), Spain (also World Championship in the Sky discipline)
- 1st, Salomon 27K 27 km (17 mi), Sweden (course record)
- 3rd, Peak Performance Vertical K, Sweden
- 1st, Fjällmaraton 44 km (27 mi), Sweden (2nd straight victory, course record)
- 1st, The Rut 50K, 50 km (31 mi), Montana, USA
- 1st, Nordic Extreme running, 12 km (7.5 mi), Sweden
- 2nd, Trail de l'Arclusaz 26.7 km (16.6 mi), France
- 1st, The North Face Endurance Challenge 50 mi (80 km), San Francisco, USA
- 1st, Sylvesterloppet, 10 km (6.2 mi), Sweden (new course record)

2017

- 1st, Ultimate Tsaigu Trail 50 km (31 mi), China
- 1st, Yading VK, China
- 1st, Yading Kora Ultra 46 km (29 mi), China
- 1st, Transvulcania 73 km (45 mi), Spain (2nd straight victory, new course record)
- 1st, Åndalsnesløpet 5 km (3.1 mi), Norway
- 3rd, Sthlm 10 10 km (6.2 mi), Sweden (also Swedish championship in road running, won the masters athletics class for women 35 years for a 2nd straight victory)
- 1st, Öland Ultra 51 km (32 mi), Sweden (2nd straight victory, course record)
- 2nd Marathon du Mont Blanc 42 km (26 mi), Italy
- 1st, Böda Beach run 10 km (6.2 mi), Sweden (3rd straight victory)
- 3rd, Malkars halvmara 21 km (13 mi), Sweden
- 2nd, Mefjellet Opp, Vertical km, Norway
- 1st, Swiss Alpine Marathon 78 km (48 mi), Switzerland
- 1st, Fjällmaraton 44 km (27 mi), Sweden (3rd straight victory)
- 1st, Ultravasan 90 km (56 mi), Sweden (new course record)
- 3rd, Lidingöloppet 30 km (19 mi), Sweden
- 2nd, Grand Trail des Templiers 76 km (47 mi), France
- 1st, North Face Endurance Challenge 50 mi (80 km), California, USA (2nd straight victory)

2018

- 1st, Transvulcania 73 km (45 mi), Spain (3rd straight victory)
- 1st, Maratòn Alpina Zegama-Aizkorri 42 km (26 mi), Spain
- 1st, Birkebeinerløpet 21 km (13 mi), Norway
- 3rd, Sthlm 10 10 km (6.2 mi), Sweden (also Swedish championship in road running, second in the masters athletics class for women 35 years)
- 1st, Öland Ultra 50 km (31 mi), Sweden (3rd straight victory, also 1st overall)
- 2nd, Besseggløpet 14 km (8.7 mi), Norway
- 2nd, Marathon du Mont Blanc 42 km (26 mi), France
- 1st, Mefjellet Opp, Vertical km, Norway
- 1st, Swiss Alpine Marathon 43 km (27 mi), Switzerland
- 8th, Sierre-Zinal 31 km (19 mi), Switzerland
- 2nd, Ultravasan 90 km (56 mi), Sweden
- 3rd Ultra-Trail Courmayeur-Champex-Chamonix (CCC) 101 km (63 mi), France
- 6th, Lidingöloppet 30 km (19 mi), Sweden
- 9th, Otter African Trail Run 42 km (26 mi), South Africa
- 5th, Swedish Cross Country Championships 4 km (2.5 mi), Sweden
- 11th, Swedish Cross Country Championships 8 km (5.0 mi), Sweden

2019

- 1st The Coastal Challenge 236 km (147 mi), 6 stages, Costa Rica (new course record; 2nd overall)
- 1st Monument Valley Half Marathon 21 km (13 mi), USA
- 1st Crown King Scramble 50 km (31 mi), USA (new course record)
- 1st Skälbyloppet 8 km (5.0 mi), Sweden

2021

- 1st Victorialoppet 9 km (5.6 mi), Sweden (second victory)
- 1st Böda Sandsloppet 6.5 km (4.0 mi), Sweden
- 1st Salomon 27K 27 km (17 mi), Sweden (second victory)
- 1st Fjällmaraton 45 km (28 mi), Sweden (fourth victory)
- 2nd Idre Fjällmaraton 45 km (28 mi), Sweden
- 3rd, Romsdalseggenløpet 8.6 km (5.3 mi), Norway
- 1st, Marató Pirineu 42 km (26 mi), Spain

2022

- 1st Fjällmaraton 45 km (28 mi), Sweden (fifth victory)
- 4th, Ultra Pirineu 42 km (26 mi), Spain
- 2nd, Trail World Championships 80 km (50 mi), Thailand

2023

- 5th, Black Canyon 100 mi (160 km), USA

==== World Cup wins ====
#	Season	Date	Race	Discipline
1	2016	7 May	Transvulcania Ultramarathon	Sky Ultra
2	2016	4 September	The Rut 50K	Sky Ultra
4	2017	13 May	Transvulcania Ultramarathon	Sky Ultra
4	2018	12 May	Transvulcania Ultramarathon	Sky Ultra
5	2018	27 May	Maratòn Alpina Zegama-Aizkorri	Sky Classic

=== Ski mountaineering ===
Year	Event	Race result				
Year	Event	Individual	Vertical	Sprint	Team	Team mates
2015	Kittelfjäll, Sweden		1 (Note: Also Swedish championship in ski mountaineering)			
2015	Keb Classic, Sweden			2	3	Lovisa Norén
2015	Narvik Rando, Norway	2				
2016	Relais des Chamois, France				1	Emelie Forsberg
2016	Font Blanca, Andorra	13	14			
2016	Valtellina Orobie, Italy	16		21		
2016	Transcavallo, Italy	9		20		
2016	Altitoy-Ternua, France				5	Malene Haukøy
2016	Pierra Menta, France				5	Marta Riba
2016	Mondolé Ski Alp, Italy	9	9			
2016	Narvik Rando, Norway	2				
2016	Keb Classic, Sweden			1	1	Jenny Råghall
2016	Norgescup Björli, Norway	3				
2017	Font Blanca, Andorra	20	11			
2017	Cambre d'Aze, France	17				
2017	Norgescup Todalen, Norway	2	2			
2017	ISMF World Championship, Tambre/Piancavallo, Italy	14	11		6 / 7 (Note: Relay race)	Fanny Borgström / Emelie Forsberg, Fanny Borgström
2017	Stryn Rando 3000, Norway	1				
2017	Romsdal Rando, Norway	1				
2017	Narvik Rando, Norway	2				
2017	Keb Classic, Sweden			1	1	Jenny Råghall
2018	Font Blanca, Andorra		10			
2018	Pierra Menta, France				4	Fanny Borgström
2019	Font Blanca, Andorra	13	9			
2020	Funäs Rando Race, Sweden	1				
2020	Comapedrosa, Andorra	22		22		
2022	Keb Classic, Sweden				1	Jenny Råghall

=== Fastest Known Time (FKT) ===
She has held the fastest known time on the following routes:

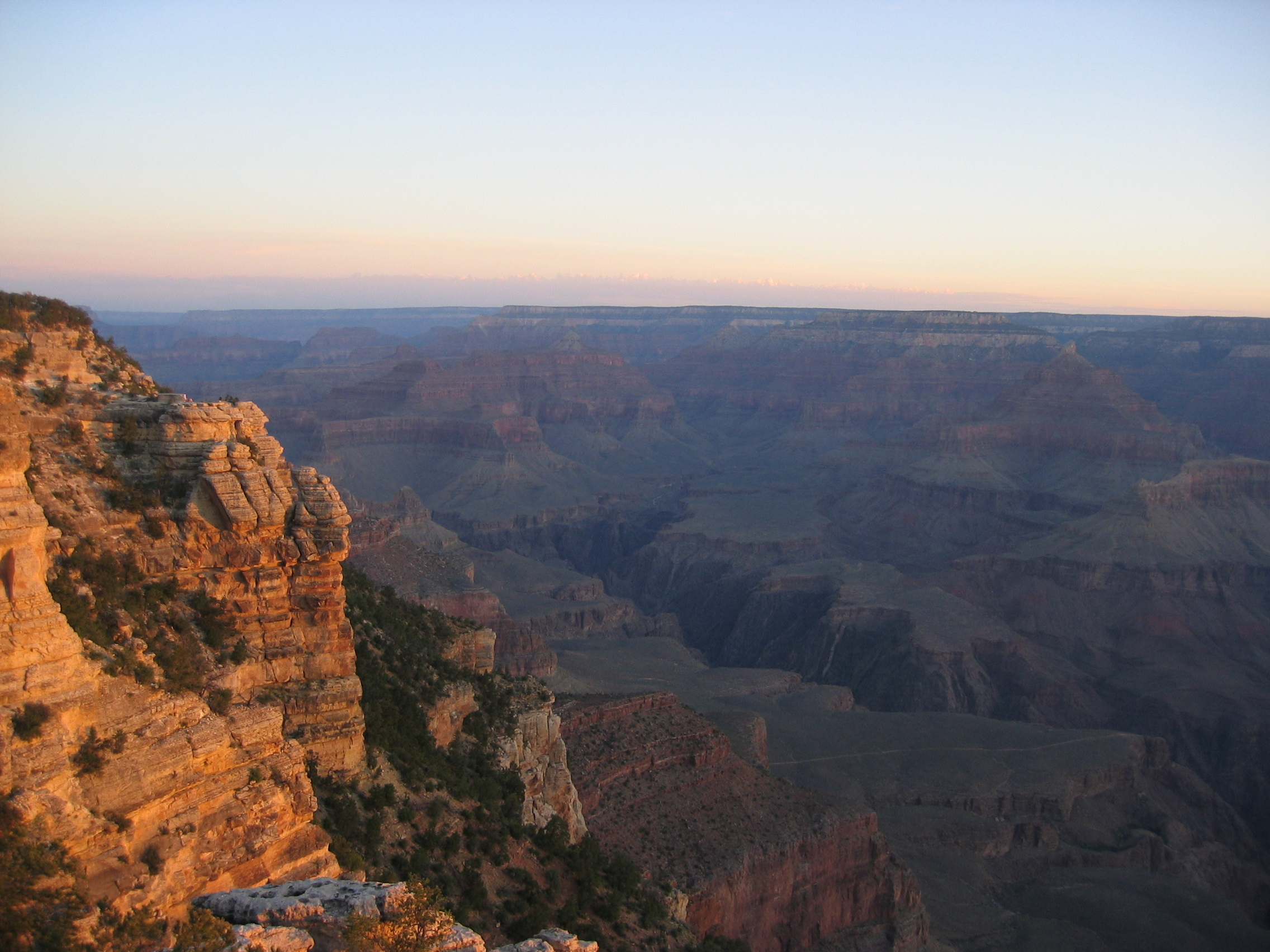
Grand Canyon viewed from South Rim, FKT 2018

- Grand Canyon, Arizona, USA, Women's FKT Rim-to Rim-to Rim (R2R2R), 7h29m16s, 16 November 2018. Taylor Newlin bettered Nilsson's time just a few days later.
