= Lisa Ring =

Swedish long-distance runner

Personal information
- Nationality: Swedish
- Born: 30 March 1993 (age 32)

Sport
- Sport: Long-distance running
- Event: Marathon

Lisa Ring (born 30 March 1993) is a Swedish long distance runner. She competed in the women's marathon at the 2017 World Championships in Athletics in London. She also competed in the IAU Trail World Championships 2019. Ring is the 2019 Swedish champion in 100 km road, and a two time winner of Ultravasan45.

Her personal record is: (updated 2019)

- 10,000 Metres 34:07.49
- Half Marathon 1:16:15 (2017)
- Marathon 2:37:27 (2017)
- 100 km 7:58:11 (2019)
