= Henrik Skoog =

Swedish middle-distance runner (born 1979)

Henrik Skoog (born 17 April 1979) is a Swedish middle distance runner.

He finished sixth in the 5,000m final at the 2006 European Athletics Championships in Gothenburg.

He won three bronze medals at the Nordic Cross Country Championships, reaching the podium in 2002, 2004 and 2006.
