= 2002 European Athletics Championships – Men's 10,000 metres =

Men's 10,000 metres at the European Athletics Championships

The men's 10,000 metres at the 2002 European Athletics Championships were held at the Olympic Stadium on August 7.

== Results ==
Rank	Name	Nationality	Time	Notes
1st place, gold medalist(s)	José Manuel Martínez	Spain	27:47.65	
2nd place, silver medalist(s)	Dieter Baumann	Germany	27:47.87	
3rd place, bronze medalist(s)	José Ríos	Spain	27:48.29	
4	Stefano Baldini	Italy	27:50.98	SB
5	Karl Keska	Great Britain	28:01.72	
6	Hassan Lahssini	France	28:05.13	
7	Marco Mazza	Italy	28:05.94	
8	Dmitry Maksimov	Russia	28:19.20	
9	Kamiel Maase	Netherlands	28:21.85	
10	Rachid Berradi	Italy	28:24.31	
11	Dennis Jensen	Denmark	28:24.55	
12	Ignacio Cáceres	Spain	28:25.84	
13	Alexander Lubina	Germany	28:43.90	
14	Claes Nyberg	Sweden	29:03.92	
15	Mario Krockert	Germany	29:08.86	
16	Séamus Power	Ireland	29:43.65	
	Abdellah Béhar	France	DNF	
