= Jenny Råghall =

Swedish ski mountaineer (born 1988)

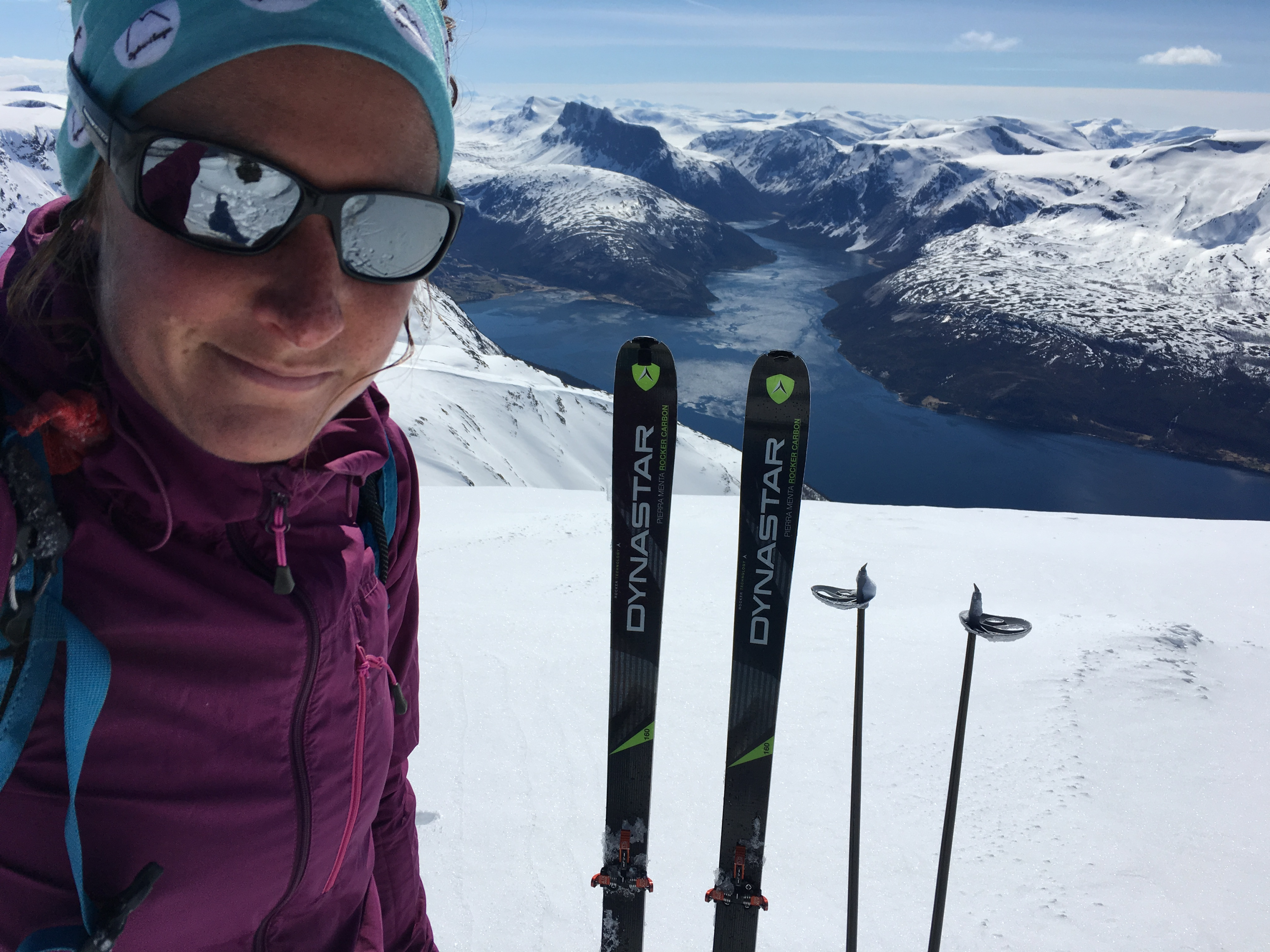
- Jenny Råghall at Steintuva south of Narvik

Personal information
- Nationality: Swedish
- Born: 30 August 1988 (age 37)
Medal record
Ski mountaineering
Swedish Championships
Gold medal – first place	2016	Female team
Gold medal – first place	2017	Female team
Gold medal – first place	2018	Female team
Gold medal – first place	2018	Female sprint
Gold medal – first place	2019	Mixed team

Jenny Råghall (born 30 August 1988) is a Swedish ski mountaineer. In 2016 and 2017 she won the Swedish team championship with Ida Nilsson and in 2018 with Caroline Tollstadius. In 2019 she switched to the mixed class which she won with David Lundsten.

Råghall works as a ski patrol member and avalanche technician, presently (2017) in Abisko. In 2012, she was injured but survived an avalanche accident at Tänndalen where the other member of the ski patrol was mortally wounded.

== Results ==
Year	Event	Race result				
Year	Event	Individual	Vertical	Sprint	Team	Teammates
2015	Narvik Rando, Norway	3				
2016	Narvik Rando, Norway	1				
2016	Keb Classic, Sweden			2	1 (Note: Also Swedish championship)	Ida Nilsson
2017	Narvik Rando, Norway	1				
2017	Keb Classic, Sweden				1	Ida Nilsson
2018	Keb Classic, Sweden			1	1	Caroline Tollstadius
2019	Keb Classic, Sweden			1	1 (Note: Mixed team)	David Lundsten
