= Ultravasan =

Cross-country running event in Dalarna, Sweden

- Status: active
- Genre: sports event
- Date: August
- Frequency: annual
- Location: Dalarna
- Country: Sweden
- Inaugurated: 2014
- Organiser: Vasaloppet

Ultravasan is an annual ultramarathon and trail run in Sweden, which was hosted for the first time in 2014 following the route of the ski race Vasaloppet. The 90 km race is the largest ultramarathon race in Sweden, and attracts more participants than the 45 km event.

The race is arranged on two distances:

- Ultravasan 90: Start in Sälen and finish in Mora, following the same trail as Vasaloppet. The race was originally 90 km, but after some modifications in 2023, the course is now 92 km. The course has also had several minor changes over the years, notably incorporating more technical terrain in the first half of the race.
- Ultravasan 45: Start in Oxberg and finish in Mora, following the second half of the Vasaloppet trail. The course is around 45 km in distance.

The races are part of the Vasaloppet Summer Week, along with the bike races CykelVasan and the shorter running races TrailVasan.

== Notable performances ==
Jonas Buud was involved in the creation of the race, and won the first two editions of Ultravasan 90. His time in 2015 is still held as the course record, although the course is now longer.

In 2019, Jim Walmsley tried to break Buud's record time, but fell two minutes short.

In 2024, Norwegian former crosscountry skier Laila Kveli won Ultravasan 90 and became the first athlete to win both the skiing race and the running race.

In 2025, Olle Meijer took the lead with one kilometer to go and won for the third year in a row. He became the first man to win Ultravasan 90 three times, and the second person to do so after Alexandra Morozova.

Also in 2025, Agnes Josefsson won Ultravasan 45 at only 19 years of age, setting a course record in the process.

== Past winners ==
Winners and official times. Course records with green background.

Winners of Ultravasan 90
| Year | Country | Men | Time | Country | Women | Time |
| 2014 | Sweden | Jonas Buud | 6:02:03 | Great Britain | Holly Rush | 7:09:04 |
| 2015 | Sweden | Jonas Buud | 5:45:08 | Switzerland | Jasmin Nunige | 7:02:35 |
| 2016 | Norway | Jarle Risa | 6:11:49 | Switzerland | Jasmin Nunige | 6:54:32 |
| 2017 | Sweden | Elov Olsson | 6:07:37 | Sweden | Ida Nilsson | 6:51:26 |
| 2018 | Sweden | Fritjof Fagerlund | 6:01:56 | Russia | Alexandra Morozova | 6:43:55 |
| 2019 | USA | Jim Walmsley | 5:47:28 | Russia | Alexandra Morozova | 7:11:07 |
| 2021 | France | Sébastien Spehler | 6:09:45 | Russia | Alexandra Morozova | 6:48:36 |
| 2022 | Sweden | Viktor Stenqvist | 6:19:07 | Sweden | Anna Hellström | 7:40:51 |
| 2023 | Sweden | Olle Meijer | 6:46:13 | Sweden | Ida Nilsson | 7:23:52 |
| 2024 | Sweden | Olle Meijer | 6:15:18 | Norway | Laila Kveli | 7:18:23 |
| 2025 | Sweden | Olle Meijer | 6:07:23 | Poland | Dominika Stelmach | 6:54:59 |

Winners of Ultravasan 45
| Year | Country | Men | Time | Country | Women | Time |
| 2014 | Russia | Roman Ryapolov | 2:49:47 | Sweden | Gloria Vinstedt | 3:28:13 |
| 2015 | Sweden | Fritjof Fagerlund | 2:45:30 | France | Caroline Dubois | 3:13:22 |
| 2016 | Russia | Roman Ryapolov | 2:41:47 | Sweden | Lisa Ring | 3:04:18 |
| 2017 | Sweden | Erik Ahnfält | 2:40:28 | Great Britain | Joasia Zakrzewski | 3:06:12 |
| 2018 | Sweden | David Nilsson | 2:39:33 | Sweden | Lisa Ring | 3:03:00 |
| 2019 | Sweden | Fredrik Eriksson | 2:49:21 | Sweden | Sofia Byhlinder | 3:09:40 |
| 2021 | Sweden | Kristofer Låås | 2:41:04 | Sweden | Liselotte Hellsten | 3.05.38 |
| 2022 | Sweden | Jesper Lundberg | 2:34:29 | Sweden | Barbro Näsström | 3.02.47 |
| 2023 | Sweden | Kristofer Låås | 2:39:47 | Sweden | Erica Lech | 3.02.09 |
| 2024 | Sweden | Jesper Lundberg | 2:35:52 | Sweden | Malin Starfelt | 2.55.18 |
| 2025 | Sweden | Linus Rosdahl | 2:32:22 | Sweden | Agnes Josefsson | 2.53.19 |
