= Silas Sang =

Kenyan long-distance runner

Silas Kipngetich Sang (born 21 August 1978) is a Kenyan long-distance runner who mainly competes in half marathon competitions. He is a three-time winner of the Portugal Half Marathon and set his personal best of 1:00:20 hours at the race in 2009.

Hailing from Kaptagat in the Rift Valley Province, he began running in international competitions in his early twenties and initially competed in track races in Finland. He was the 2005 winner of the Lidingöloppet Swedish cross country race and also won the Göteborgsvarvet half marathon that year. Working with long-distance coach El-Mostafa Nechchadi, he made his debut over the marathon distance in 2006 at the Madrid Marathon and came second in a time of 2:11:44 hours. It was over the half marathon that he had more success, however, as he had back-to-back victories from 2006 to 2008 in races in Malaga, Torremolinos, Seville and Albacete. His streak came to an end with a runner-up finish at the 2008 Göteborgsvarvet.

Sang defeated former world record holder Paul Tergat at the 2008 Portugal Half Marathon and set a new course record of 1:01:26 hours. He placed eighth at the Kenyan Cross Country Championships at the start of 2009 and spent much of that year competing in road races in the United States, which included top three finishes at the Azalea Trail Run and Cherry Blossom 10-Miler. He returned to the Portugal Half Marathon in Lisbon and successfully defended his title with a personal best run of 1:00.20 hours, beating World Championship medallist Emmanuel Kipchirchir Mutai in the process.

The following March he entered the city's other race, the Lisbon Half Marathon, but proved to be far off the world record pace of winner Zersenay Tadese, as Sang finish in twelfth. Undeterred, he signed up for the same race the following year and although Zersenay Tadese was again the winner, Sang produced one of the best performances of his career, coming third in a time of 1:00:38 hours. He ran at the 2011 Ottawa Marathon in May and set a personal best of 2:10:58 hours in spite of a five-year gap since his previous outing over the distance, taking fourth place. A third career victory at the Portugal Half Marathon came in September, as he held off challenges from Silas Kipruto and Lucas Rotich. He further improved his marathon best at the 2012 Nagano Marathon, where his time of 2:09:10 was five seconds behind winner Francis Kibiwott.
