= Claes Nyberg =

Swedish long-distance runner

Medal record

Men's athletics

Representing Sweden

European Cross Country Championships
Silver medal – second place	1997 Oeiras	Senior race

Claes Nyberg (born 3 March 1971) is a Swedish former long-distance runner who competes mostly in cross country running. His highest international achievement was a silver medal at the 1997 European Cross Country Championships. He made seven appearances at the IAAF World Cross Country Championships between 1989 and 2002, with his best placing of 33rd coming both 2000 and 2001. He was Sweden's leading cross country runner during his career.

Nyberg won fourteen individual national titles during his career. He was a perennial runner-up at the Nordic Cross Country Championships, taking the second spot on five occasions between 1997 and 2002. He finally won the Nordic title in 2004. He also twice represented Sweden at the European Athletics Championships, running the 10,000 metres in 1998 and 2002.

== International competitions ==
Year	Competition	Venue	Position	Event	Notes
1989	World Cross Country Championships	Stavanger, Norway	21st	Junior race	26:49
1989	World Cross Country Championships	Stavanger, Norway	21st	Junior team	325 pts
1990	World Cross Country Championships	Aix-les-Bains, France	24th	Junior race	23:55
1990	World Junior Championships	Plovdiv, Bulgaria	10th (heats)	5000 m	14:26.11
1992	European U23 Cup B	Villeneuve-d'Ascq, France	1st	5000 m	13:59.16
1993	World Indoor Championships	Toronto, Canada	6th (heats)	3000 m	7:56.03
1994	European Indoor Championships	Paris, France	17th (heats)	3000 m	8:03.08
1996	World Cross Country Championships	Stellenbosch, South Africa	77th	Senior race	36:36
1997	World Cross Country Championships	Turin, Italy	83rd	Senior race	37:40
1997	European Cross Country Championships	Oeiras, Portugal	2nd	Senior race	27:20
1997	Nordic Cross Country Championships	Helsinki, Finland	2nd	Senior race	26:52
1998	European Championships	Budapest, Hungary	18th	10,000 m	29:28.88
1998	Nordic Cross Country Championships	Ålgård, Norway	2nd	Senior race	28:10
1999	European Cross Country Championships	Velenje, Slovenia	6th	Senior race	33:46
1999	Nordic Cross Country Championships	Enhörna, Sweden	2nd	Senior race	27:27
2000	World Cross Country Championships	Vilamoura, Portugal	33rd	Senior race	37:01
2001	World Cross Country Championships	Ostend, Belgium	33rd	Senior race	41:32
2001	European Cross Country Championships	Thun, Switzerland	9th	Senior race	28:14
2001	Nordic Cross Country Championships	Perniö, Finland	2nd	Senior race	26:53
2002	World Cross Country Championships	Dublin, Ireland	39th	Senior race	36:42
2002	European Championships	Munich, Germany	14th	10,000 m	29:03.92
2002	Nordic Cross Country Championships	Geithus, Norway	2nd	Senior race	26:36
2003	World Half Marathon Championships	Vilamoura, Portugal	58th	Half marathon	1:07:12
2003	Nordic Cross Country Championships	Kvarnsveden, Sweden	3rd	Senior race	29:04
2004	Nordic Cross Country Championships	Ejby, Denmark	1st	Senior race	29:34

== National titles ==
- Swedish Athletics Championships
  - 5000 m: 1994, 1996
  - 10,000 m: 1995, 2000, 2001
- Swedish Cross Country Championships
  - Short race: 1996, 1997, 1998, 1999, 2000, 2001, 2002
  - Long race: 1995
- Swedish Indoor Championships
  - 1500 m: 1993
