= Göteborgsvarvet =

Annual half marathon in Gothenburg, Sweden

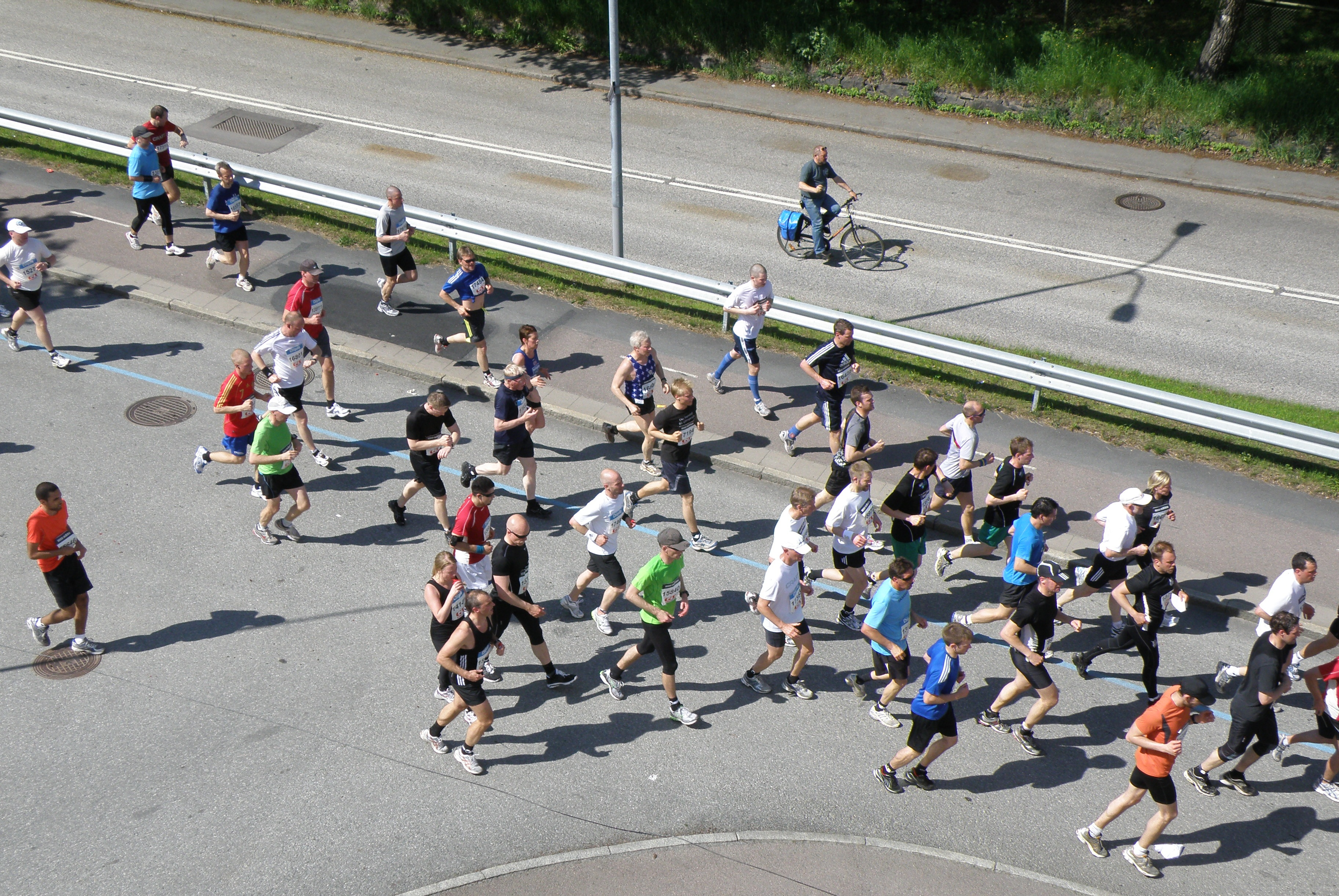
- Runners at the 2010 edition of the race
- Date: May
- Location: Gothenburg, Sweden
- Event type: Road
- Distance: Half marathon
- Established: 1980; 46 years ago
- Course records: Men's: 59:35 (2016) (Kenya) Richard Mengich; Women's: 1:07:58 (2017) (Kenya) Fancy Chemutai
- Website: Göteborgsvarvet
- Participants: 39,221 (2019)

Göteborgsvarvet (Swedish: [jœtɛˈbɔ̂rjsˌvarːvɛt]) is an annual half marathon running competition in Gothenburg, Sweden (often called the Gothenburg Half Marathon in English). It is the largest annual running competition in the world in terms of entries, with its 62,000 entries for the Göteborgsvarvet competition on 18 May 2013. In 2016, 64,500 people entered the race. The youngest runner was 17 years old and the oldest female runner 83 and male runner 87.

Its name is a word play; the Swedish language-word "varv" has a double meaning and can mean both lap and shipyard ("[skepps]varv"), as Gothenburg historically has been known as a shipyard town (Gothenburgers also particularly enjoy word-play-humour).

The race takes place in May, and has been organised annually since 1980. It starts outside, and finishes in, the old athletics arena Slottsskogsvallen in the Slottsskogen park. It takes off northwards over the large suspension bridge Älvsborg Bridge, follows the north bank to the Göta älv river, and returns over Hisingen Bridge, goes through the inner city, before reaching the finish.

The race has hosted the Swedish national championship race on five occasions (1995, 2007, 2009, 2012, 2016 and 2017).

The 2020 and 2021 editions were both cancelled because of the Coronavirus pandemic.

== Past winners ==
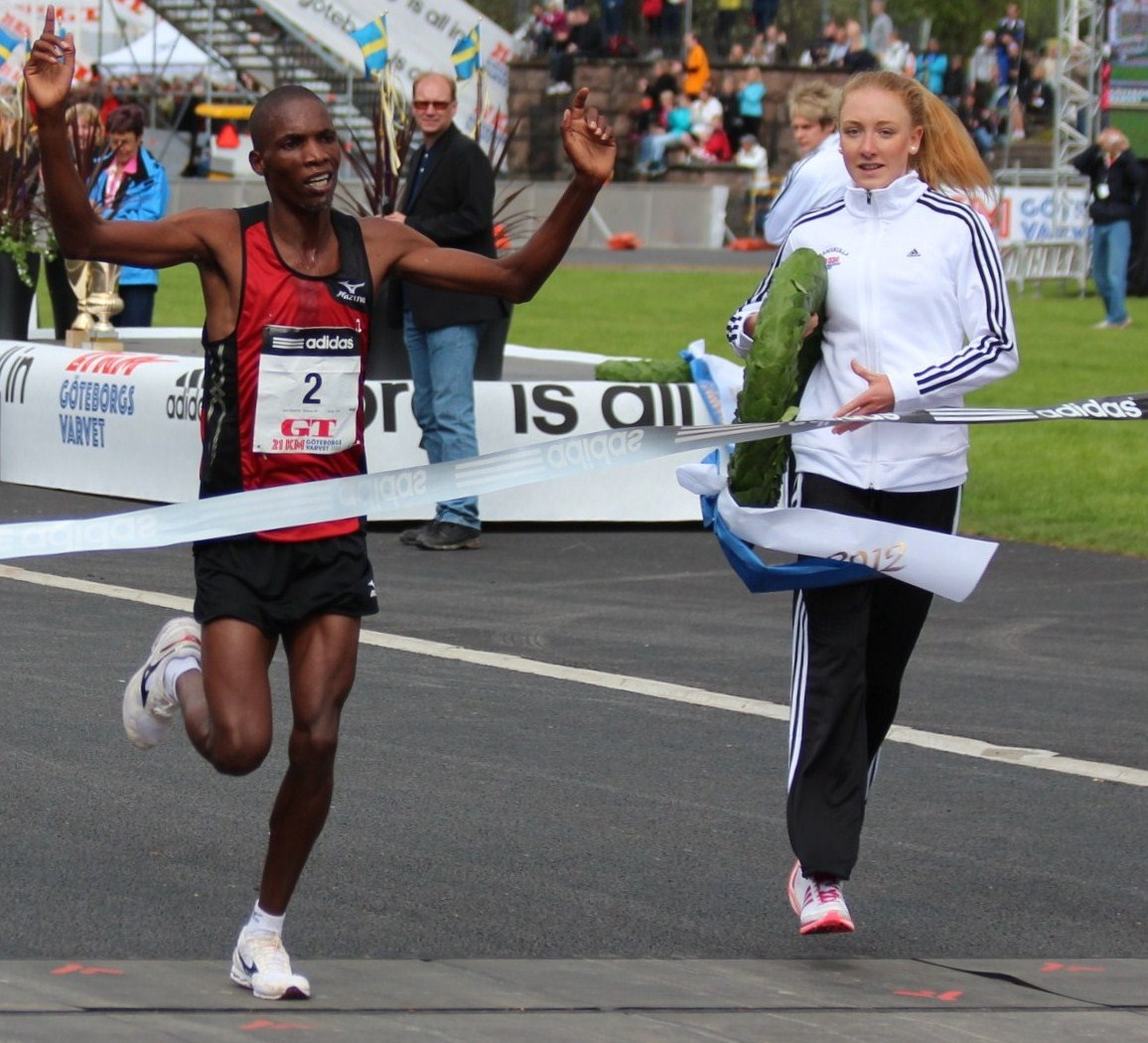
Victor Kipchirchir winning the 2012 Göteborgsvarvet.

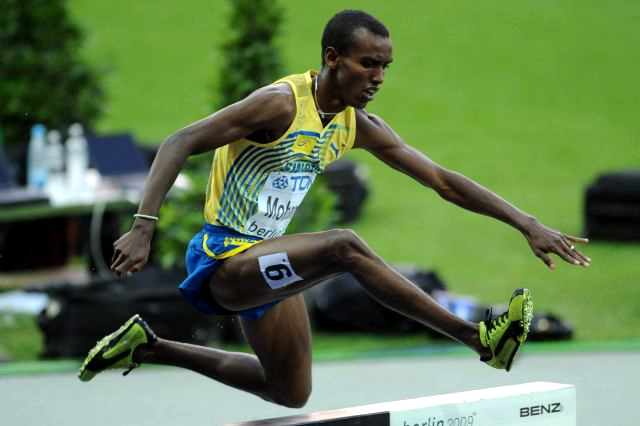
Steeplechase specialist Mustafa Mohamed is a two-time winner of the race

Key: Course record Swedish national championship race

| Year | Men's winner | Time (h:m:s) | Women's winner | Time (h:m:s) |
|---|---|---|---|---|
| 1980 | Göran Högberg (SWE) | 1:06:17 | Midde Hamrin (SWE) | 1:15:50 |
| 1981 | Göran Högberg (SWE) | 1:05:44 | Evy Palm (SWE) | 1:17:47 |
| 1982 | Mats Erixon (SWE) | 1:02:54 | Grete Waitz (NOR) | 1:09:57 |
| 1983 | Tommy Persson (SWE) | 1:04:40 | Jeanette Nordgren (SWE) | 1:14:54 |
| 1984 | Mats Erixon (SWE) | 1:03:14 | Midde Hamrin (SWE) | 1:10:46 |
| 1985 | Mats Erixon (SWE) | 1:04:35 | Jeanette Nordgren (SWE) | 1:13:44 |
| 1986 | Mats Erixon (SWE) | 1:03:41 | Evy Palm (SWE) | 1:12:11 |
| 1987 | Mats Erixon (SWE) | 1:03:37 | Midde Hamrin (SWE) | 1:13:24 |
| 1988 | Håkan Börjesson (SWE) | 1:05:13 | Evy Palm (SWE) | 1:14:19 |
| 1989 | Francis Naali (TAN) | 1:03:35 | Elisabeth Johannesson (SWE) | 1:17:16 |
| 1990 | Francis Naali (TAN) | 1:01:54 | Midde Hamrin (SWE) | 1:12:45 |
| 1991 | Andrea Nade (KEN) | 1:04:38 | Ingrid Kristiansen (NOR) | 1:12:30 |
| 1992 | Onesmo Ludago (TAN) | 1:03:24 | Suzanne Rigg (GBR) | 1:13:26 |
| 1993 | Francis Naali (TAN) | 1:03:37 | Ritva Lemettinen (FIN) | 1:13:30 |
| 1994 | Onesmo Ludago (TAN) | 1:03:08 | Ritva Lemettinen (FIN) | 1:13:04 |
| 1995 | Richard Nerurkar (GBR) | 1:02:39 | Ritva Lemettinen (FIN) | 1:13:18 |
| 1996 | Wilson Musto (KEN) | 1:03:12 | Aniela Nikiel (POL) | 1:14:29 |
| 1997 | Martin Ojuku (KEN) | 1:01:44 | Joyce Chepchumba (KEN) | 1:09:50 |
| 1998 | Fred Ntabo (KEN) | 1:03:28 | Nadesjda Iljina (RUS) | 1:12:31 |
| 1999 | Rachid Aït Bensalem (MAR) | 1:02:18 | Nadesjda Iljina (RUS) | 1:11:47 |
| 2000 | Phaustin Baha (TAN) | 1:02:42 | Stine Larsen (NOR) | 1:09:28 |
| 2001 | Pavel Loskutov (EST) | 1:03:00 | Stine Larsen (NOR) | 1:11:07 |
| 2002 | Mustafa Mohamed (SWE) | 1:03:35 | Lena Gavelin (SWE) | 1:13:03 |
| 2003 | Benjamin Rotich (KEN) | 1:03:43 | Meriem Wangari (KEN) | 1:13:27 |
| 2004 | Mustafa Mohamed (SWE) | 1:04:03 | Leah Kiprono (KEN) | 1:18:06 |
| 2005 | Silas Sang (KEN) | 1:03:19 | Susan Kirui (KEN) | 1:12:34 |
| 2006 | Abdelkader El Mouaziz (MAR) | 1:02:14 | Helena Javornik (SLO) | 1:12:34 |
| 2007 | Sylvester Teimet (KEN) | 1:04:03 | Kirsten Otterbu (NOR) | 1:12:38 |
| 2008 | Sylvester Teimet (KEN) | 1:01:21 | Kirsten Otterbu (NOR) | 1:10:19 |
| 2009 | Nicholas Kamakya (KEN) | 1:01:55 | Ana Dulce Félix (POR) | 1:11:27 |
| 2010 | Sammy Kirui (KEN) | 1:01:10 | Amane Gobena (ETH) | 1:11:40 |
| 2011 | Albert Matebor (KEN) | 1:00:52 | Joyce Chepkirui (KEN) | 1:09:04 |
| 2012 | Victor Kipchirchir (KEN) | 1:00:25 | Hilda Kibet (NED) | 1:09:27 |
| 2013 | Jackson Kiprop (UGA) | 1:03:13 | Isabella Ochichi (KEN) | 1:11:29 |
| 2014 | Ghirmay Ghebreslassie (ERI) | 1:00:36 | Worknesh Degefa (ETH) | 1:10:12 |
| 2015 | Richard Mengich (KEN) | 1:00:44 | Worknesh Degefa (ETH) | 1:08:13 |
| 2016 | Richard Mengich (KEN) | 0:59:35 | Violah Jepchumba (KEN) | 1:08:01 |
| 2017 | Geoffrey Yegon (KEN) | 1:00:19 | Fancy Chemutai (KEN) | 1:07:58 |
| 2018 | Shadrack Kimining (KEN) | 1:01:31 | Meseret Tola (ETH) | 1:09:06 |
| 2019 | Shadrack Kimining (KEN) | 1:00:38 | Tabitha Gichia (KEN) | 1:08:18 |
| 2020 | Cancelled due to the COVID-19 pandemic | | | |
| 2021 | Cancelled due to the COVID-19 pandemic | | | |
| 2022 | Amos Kipruto (KEN) | 1:00:50 | Tigist Assefa (ETH) | 1:08:20 |
| 2023 | Edmond Kipngetich (KEN) | 1.01.46 | Susan Chembai (KEN) | 1.10.40 |
| 2024 | Moses Koech (KEN) | 1:02:56 | Janet Ruguru (KEN) | 1:11:35 |
| 2025 | Suldan Hassan (SWE) | 1.03.39 | Karoline Bjerkeli Grøvdal (NOR) | 01.08.33 |
| 2026 | Suldan Hassan (SWE) | 1.03.30 | Meraf Bahta (SWE) | 1.13.03 |
