= Mikael Ekvall =

Swedish long-distance runner

Personal information
- Nationality: Swedish
- Born: 18 June 1989 (age 37)

Sport
- Sport: Long-distance running
- Event: Marathon

Mikael Ekvall (born 18 June 1989) is a Swedish long distance runner. He competed in the men's marathon at the 2017 World Championships in Athletics, placing 32nd with the time of 2:18:12, his season's best. In 2018, he competed in the men's marathon at the 2018 European Athletics Championships held in Berlin, Germany. He did not finish his race. In 2020, he competed in the men's race at the 2020 World Athletics Half Marathon Championships held in Gdynia, Poland.

In 2008, Ekvall participated in the Göteborgsvarvet during which he defecated in his shorts while running the half-marathon. An image of the incident has since been the source of an Internet meme. He placed 21st in the event.
