= Johanna Nilsson =

Swedish runner (1983–2013)

Medal record

Women's athletics

Representing Sweden

European Cross Country Championships
Bronze medal – third place	2005 Tilburg	Senior race

Johanna Nilsson (27 March 1983 – 25 June 2013) was a Swedish middle- and long-distance runner. She was a bronze medallist at the European Cross Country Championships in 2005. Despite an early retirement in 2006 she had a highly successful collegiate career in the United States, winning three NCAA indoor titles and winning the NCAA Women's Division I Cross Country Championship in 2005. Her sister, Ida Nilsson, is also an international distance runner.

== Career ==
A native of Kalmar, Sweden, she competed in running competitions at young age. Her sister, Ida Nilsson, also competed internationally for Sweden. Among her first international honours was an individual silver medal and team gold in the junior section of the 2000 Nordic Cross Country Championships. Sweden took a clean sweep of that race, with the Nilsson sisters taking the top two spots. She gained a scholarship to attend Northern Arizona University in 2002, where her sister was already competing. Both sisters had much success at the college. Running for the Northern Arizona Lumberjacks, Johanna Nilsson won the indoor mile run at the NCAA Women's Division I Indoor Track and Field Championships then took the NCAA Women's Division I Cross Country Championship in 2005. In her final year in 2006 she won a double in the indoor mile and 3000 metres at the NCAA Indoor Championships. She was also highly successful at the Big Sky Conference championships, taking the middle-distance double at the regional outdoor championships three times consecutively, as well as taking five Big Sky indoor middle-distance titles. She won the Big Sky Cross Country title once, in 2005, having finished runner-up to her sister on two occasions. Ida Nilsson was a four-time Big Sky Cross Country champion and in a 2014 poll of the greatest female athletes of the Big Sky Conference Johanna was ranked second and Ida third. Both were inducted into the Northern Arizona Lumberjacks hall of fame.

Nilsson appeared at three major international championships for Sweden. In her first she ranked fourth in the 1500 metres at the 2003 European Athletics U23 Championships (originally fifth before Rasa Drazdauskaitė's disqualification). She returned to that event at the 2005 European Athletics U23 Championships, but finished a distant last in twelfth place. Her greatest international success came on her major senior debut at the 2005 European Cross Country Championships. There she had a late surge and finished with the bronze medal. This made her Sweden's second ever senior women's medallist at the competition after former champion Sara Wedlund.

Nilsson began preparations for the 2006 European Athletics Championships, held in her native Sweden in Gothenburg, but instead she decided to finish her career as she had tired of the sport. Her Lumberjacks coach John Hayes later remarked how Nilsson's dedication to running had wavered – she would work intensely in training, but other times would completely miss large segments of training, opting to travel instead, for which she retained a great interest. Nilsson died by suicide 2013, dying at the age of thirty.

== International competitions ==
Year	Competition	Venue	Position	Event	Notes
2000	Nordic Cross Country Championships	Copenhagen, Denmark	2nd	Junior race	15:13
2000	Nordic Cross Country Championships	Copenhagen, Denmark	1st	Junior team	6 pts
2003	European U23 Championships	Bydgoszcz, Poland	4th	1500 m	4:13.64
2005	European U23 Championships	Erfurt, Germany	12th	1500 m	4:25.79
2005	European Cross Country Championships	Tilburg, Netherlands	3rd	Senior race	20:01
