= Portugal Half Marathon =

Road running event in Lisbon, Portugal

- Date: October
- Location: Lisbon, Portugal
- Event type: Road
- Distance: 21 km
- Primary sponsor: Hyundai
- Established: 2000
- Course records: Men's: 1:00:12 (2019) (Kenya) Titus Ekiru; Women's: 1:06:54 (2019) (Kenya) Peres Jepchirchir
- Website: Official website
- Participants: 2,385 finishers (2021)

Luso Portugal Half Marathon or Hyundai Meia Maratona de Portugal is an annual half marathon contested every October in Lisbon, Portugal.

A new, faster course was established for the race in 2010 and 25 km record holder Mary Keitany duly responded by setting a women's course record of 1:08:46. She returned the following year and defended her title in another women's course record of 1:07:54 hours, while Silas Sang had his third victory in the men's competition.

== Winners ==
Key: Course record

Edition	Year	Men's winner	Country	Time (h:m:s)	Women's winner	Country	Time (h:m:s)
24th	2024	Mosinet Geremew	Ethiopia	1:03:09	Faith Chepchirchir	Kenya	1:10:33
23rd	2023	Abraham Cheroben	Bahrain	1:00:20	Enatnesh Tirusew	Ethiopia	1:08:40
22nd	2022	Charles Langat	Kenya	1:00:44	Emebet Niguse	Ethiopia	1:09:35
21st	2021	Gerba Dibaba	Ethiopia	1:01:21	Ethlemahu Sintayehu	Ethiopia	1:10:48
20th	2019	Titus Ekiru	Kenya	1:00:12	Peres Jepchirchir	Kenya	1:06:54
19th	2018	Mustapha El Aziz	Morocco	1:00:16	Yebrgual Melese	Ethiopia	1:07:18
18th	2017	Birhan Nebebew	Ethiopia	1:02:02	Eunice Chumba	Bahrain	1:08:48
17th	2016	Nguse Amlosom	Eritrea	1:02:39	Genet Yalew	Ethiopia	1:10:25
16th	2015	Nguse Amlosom	Eritrea	1:02:38	Beatrice Mutai	Kenya	1:09:50
15th	2014	Stephen Kibet	Kenya	1:01:06	Purity Rionoripo	Kenya	1:11:02
14th	2013	Wilson Kiprop	Kenya	1:00:19	Valeria Straneo	Italy	1:09:21
13th	2012	Martin Lel	Kenya	1:01:28	Priscah Jeptoo	Kenya	1:10:32
12th	2011	Silas Sang	Kenya	1:01:13	Mary Keitany	Kenya	1:07:54
11th	2010	Tadese Tola	Ethiopia	1:01:05	Mary Keitany	Kenya	1:08:46
10th	2009	Silas Sang	Kenya	1:00:20	Helena Kirop	Kenya	1:10:26
9th	2008	Silas Sang	Kenya	1:01:28	Rita Jeptoo	Kenya	1:09:48
8th	2007	Emmanuel Mutai	Kenya	1:01:54	Bezunesh Bekele	Ethiopia	1:10:20
7th	2006	Robert Cheruiyot	Kenya	1:02:51	Pamela Chepchumba	Kenya	1:11:07
6th	2005	Martin Lel	Kenya	1:01:37	Rose Cheruiyot	Kenya	1:12:49
5th	2004	William Kiplagat	Kenya	1:01:38	Margaret Okayo	Kenya	1:09:53
4th	2003	Hendrick Ramaala	South Africa	1:02:10	Derartu Tulu	Ethiopia	1:11:30
3rd	2002	Felix Limo	Kenya	1:02:05	Margaret Okayo	Kenya	1:09:51
2nd	2001	David Makori	Kenya	1:02:18	Fatuma Roba	Ethiopia	1:10:29
1st	2000	David Makori	Kenya	1:01:40	Derartu Tulu	Ethiopia	1:09:09
