= David Nilsson (runner) =

Swedish long-distance runner

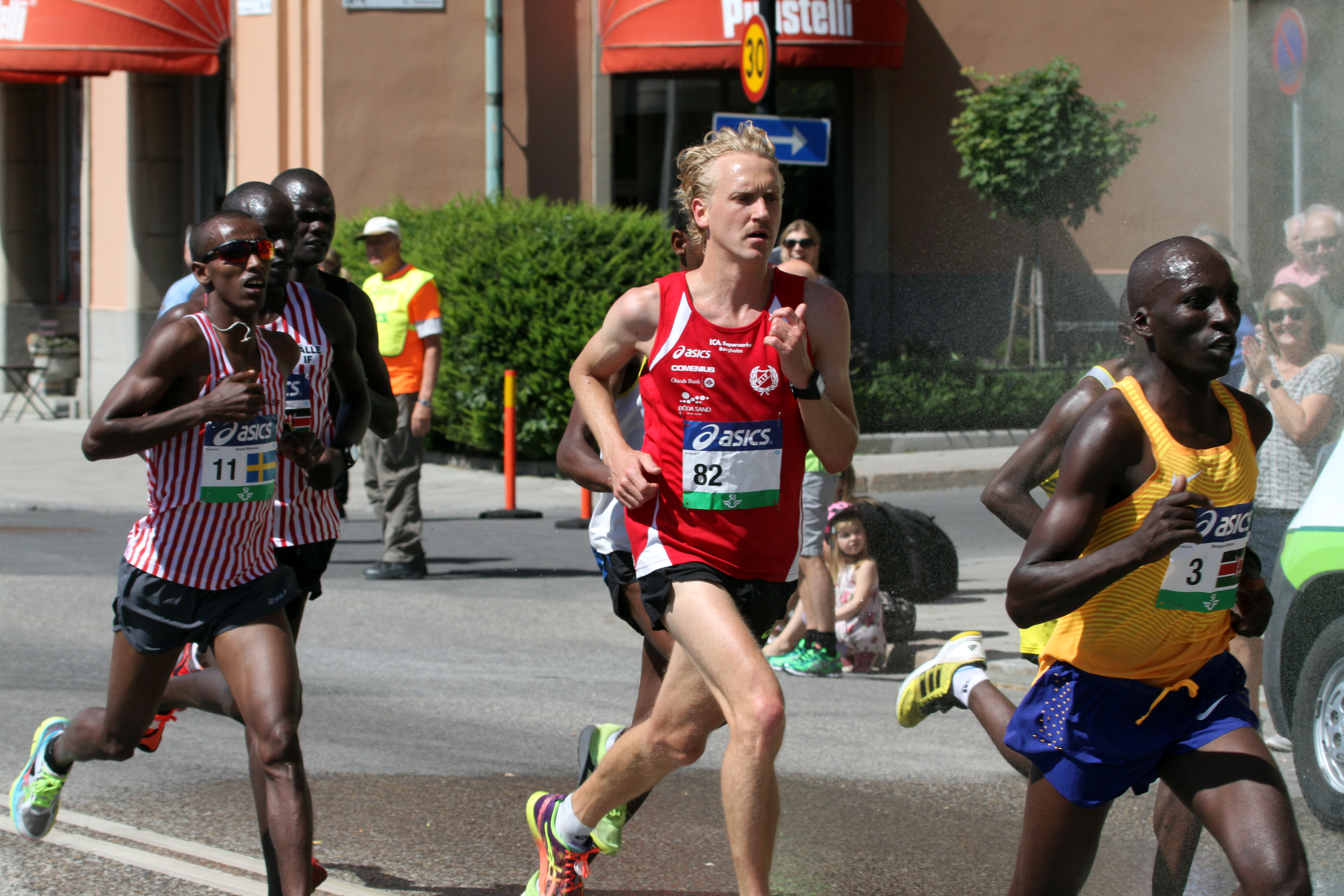
- David Nilsson (red) at the 2016 Stockholm Marathon

Personal information
- Born: 16 April 1987 (age 39)

Sport
- Country: Sweden
- Sport: Track and field
- Event: Marathon

David Nilsson (born 16 April 1987) is a Swedish long-distance runner who specialises in the marathon. He competed in the marathon event at the 2015 World Championships in Athletics and at the 2014 European Championships.

Nilsson hails from Kalmar in the flat southern Sweden. He grew up in a sports family where both his father Carl-Gustaf ”Calle” and mother Katarina competed at an elite level. His brother Marcus and two sisters, Ida and Johanna, have belonged to the Swedish national team in athletics. At the 2002 Swedish cross country championships the family walked home with four gold medals, one silver and one bronze.
