= Francis Robert Naali =

Tanzanian marathon runner

Personal information
- Born: 13 January 1972 (age 54)
Medal record
Men's Athletics
Representing Tanzania
Commonwealth Games
Gold medal – first place	2002 Manchester	Marathon

Francis Robert Naali (born 12 January 1972) is a Tanzanian marathon runner, who won the gold medal at the 2002 Commonwealth Games held in Manchester in a time of 2:11:58 hours.
