= Anna Holm Baumeister =

Danish long-distance runner

Anna Holm
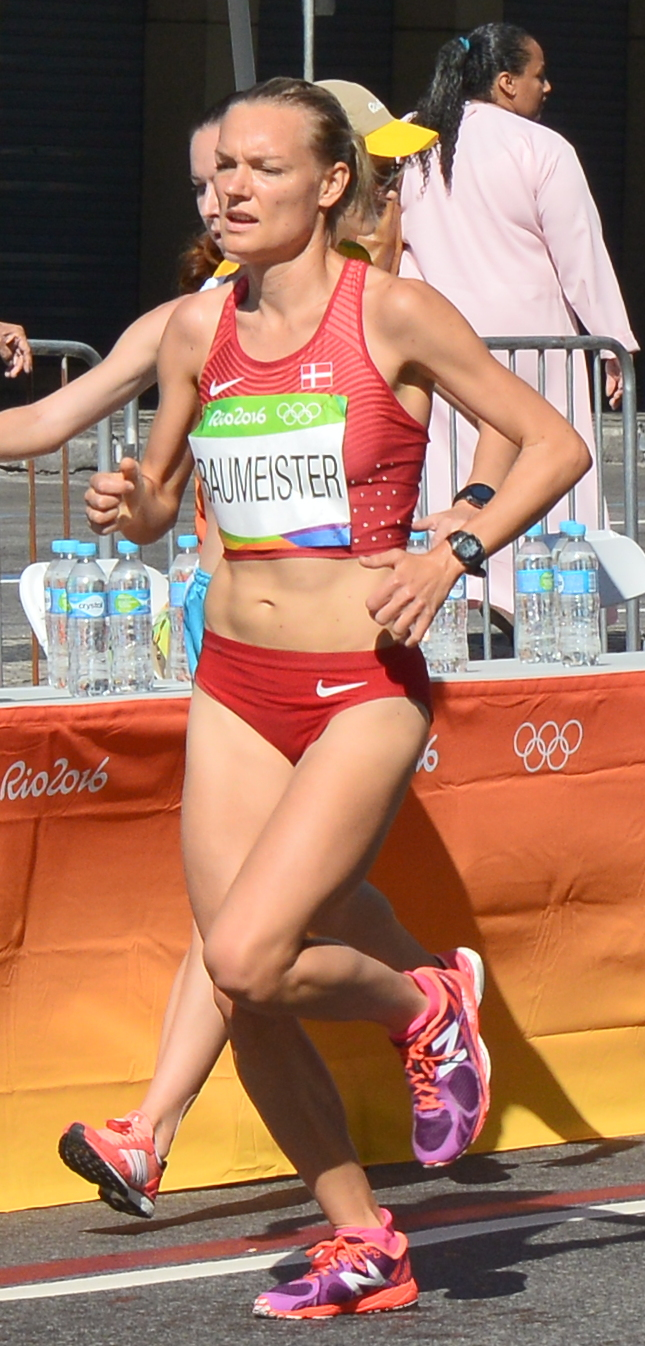
- Holm at the 2016 Olympics

Personal information
- Full name: Anna Sofie Holm
- Nationality: Danish
- Born: Jørgensen; 29 December 1987 (age 38)
- Height: 168 cm (5 ft 6 in)
- Weight: 54 kg (119 lb)

Sport
- Country: Denmark
- Sport: Track and field
- Events: Marathon, half marathon
- Club: Sparta Atletik
- Coached by: Claus Hechmann

Achievements and titles
- Personal bests: HM – 1:13:34 (2015); Marathon – 2:34:28 (2015)

Anna Holm (former Jørgensen, born 29 December 1987) is a Danish marathon runner. She placed 55th at the 2016 Olympics. Her father Henrik Jørgensen won the 1988 London Marathon. Her mother Mette Holm Hansen is also a marathon runner. She works as a marketing and communications specialist.

== Personal bests ==
- 800 meters: 2:12,96 (2005)
- 1500 meters: 4:27,86 (2005)
- 3000 meters: 9:13,92 (2015)
- 5000 meters: 16:10,19 (2016)
- 10000 meters: 33:56,55 (2016)
- 10 km: 33:31 (Odense, 2017, point to point run)
- 10 km: 33:37 (Great 10K Berlin, 2026)
- Half Marathon: 1:12:56 (Copenhagen Half Marathon, 2017)
- Marathon: 2:33,02 (Frankfurt Marathon, 2017)
