= Fjällmaraton =

Long distance race in Sweden

Fjällmaraton (literally Mountain Marathon in Swedish) is a long distance race, considered one of the hardest and most important one-day mountain marathons in Sweden. The total route has a length of 43 km (27 mi) with a cumulative elevation gain of 2,100 meters and similar elevation loss. The race takes place between the mountain resorts Vålådalen and Trillevallen in Åre Municipality, Jämtland County since 2005. Until 2012 the race was known by the name Vértex Fjällmaraton, then AXA Fjällmarathon and from 2017 KIA Fjällmarathon depending on varying sponsors.

Over time additional races have been added to the original Fjällmaraton proper, currently:

- Öppet Fjäll (Open course) runs the marathon course but without the mass start of the racing day so that runners may run at a leisurely tempo at their own convenience
- Halvmaraton (Half-marathon, in 2016 called Salomon 27K), 27 km (17 mi) with a cumulative elevation gain of 1,150 meters
- Kvartsmaraton (Quarter-marathon), 13 km (8.1 mi) with a cumulative elevation gain of 600 meters
- Minimaraton (Mini-marathon), a children's race with two age categories: 0–6 years run 800 meters, 7+ years run 1,500 meters
- Vertical K (Vertical kilometer), a race to the peak of Åreskutan
- Inov-8 sprinten, a sprint where competitors take on qualifiers and heats before reaching the final

In 2012-2014 Ottfjället upp was a vertical race to the peak of Ottfjället, but this was replaced by Vertical K to the peak of Åreskutan in 2015.

== Winners ==
The course has changed over time in different ways so course records are not listed here. The fastest male winning times have been under 3 hours 30 minutes and the fastest female winning times a little under 4 hours, so considerably slower than a normal asphalt marathon race.

Andreas Svanebo has won the race six times in seven starts. On the women's side Ida Nilsson has won four times in four starts.

Emelie Forsberg's first win in 2009 is widely cited, including on CNN. She had borrowed a backpack from a friend and brought a chocolate mud cake that she had baked. Before the last big ascent, she stopped for 20 minutes and ate the cake, got new energy and won the race. Two years later she was back, did not stop to eat en route and improved her time by 30 minutes. In 2014 the by then established world class runner Forsberg was back again and improved her time by another 30 minutes.

Year	Country	Man	Country	Woman
2005	Sweden	Andreas Svanebo	Sweden	Hanna Wikberg
2006	Sweden	Fredrik Sätter	Sweden	Kicki Fransson
2007	Sweden	Andreas Svanebo	Sweden	Therese Svensson
2008	Sweden	Andreas Svanebo	Sweden	Maria Lundgren
2009	Sweden	Andreas Svanebo	Sweden	Emelie Forsberg
2010	Sweden	Anton Sjöholm	Sweden	Therese Svensson
2011	Sweden	Andreas Svanebo	Sweden	Emelie Forsberg
2012	Sweden	Andreas Svanebo	Sweden	Annika Billstam
2013	Sweden	Anders Kleist	Sweden	Lena Gavelin
2014	Norway	Eirik Haugsnes	Sweden	Emelie Forsberg
2015	Sweden	Anders Kleist	Sweden	Ida Nilsson
2016	Sweden	Anders Kleist	Sweden	Ida Nilsson
2017	Sweden	Andreas Svanebo	Sweden	Ida Nilsson
2018	Norway	Jo Forseth Indgaard	Sweden	Fanny Borgström
2019	Sweden	André Jonsson	Sweden	Fanny Borgström
2020	Sweden	Olle Kalered	Sweden	Tove Alexandersson
2021	United Kingdom	Jonathan Albon	Sweden	Ida Nilsson
