= Kirsten Melkevik Otterbu =

Norwegian long-distance runner

Kirsten Melkevik
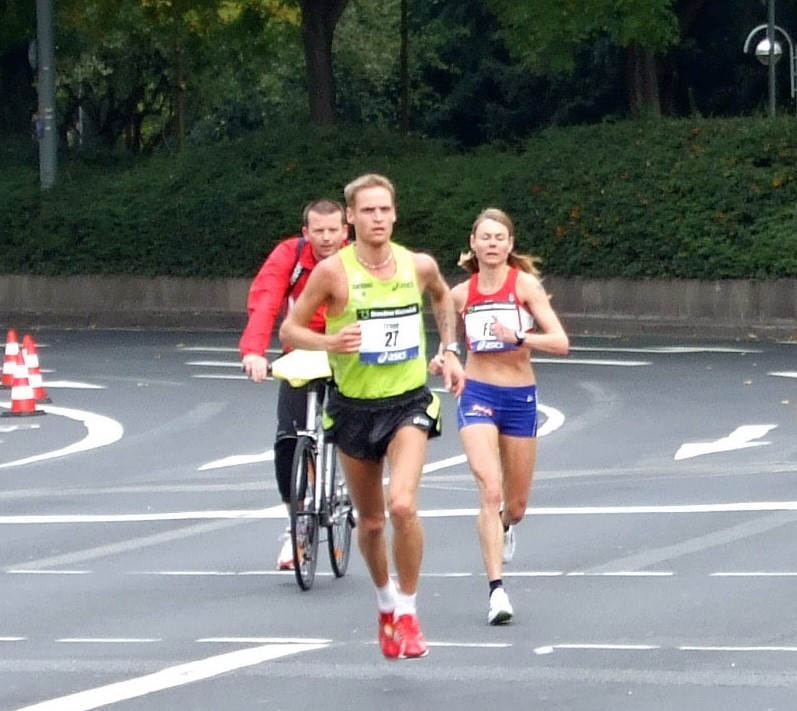
- Kirsten Melkevik Otterbu (right)

Personal information
- Nickname: Marathon
- Nationality: Norwegian
- Born: 29 May 1970 (age 56)

Sport
- Country: Norway
- Sport: Mountain running

Kirsten Melkevik Otterbu (née Melkevik May 29 May 1970) is a Norwegian long-distance runner who specializes in the marathon.

== Biography ==
In the marathon event she finished 28th at the 2005 World Championships, 13th at the 2006 European Championships, 29th at the 2007 World Championships and 34th at the 2008 Olympic Games. She won the Stockholm Marathon in 2007.

She became Norwegian champion in the 5000 metres in 2006, in the 10,000 metres in 2006 and 2007 and in the half marathon in 2006. She was born in Øystese, and represents the sports club IL Gular.

Melkevik received attention when she changed her legal name from Kirsten Melkevik Otterbu to Kirsten Marathon Melkevik in September 2010.

== Personal bests ==
- 3000 metres - 8:58.74 min (2008)
- 5000 metres - 16:00.51 min (2006)
- 10,000 metres - 32:31.45 min (2008)
- Half marathon - 1:10:19 hrs (2006) - fourth among Norwegian half marathon runners, only behind Ingrid Kristiansen, Grete Waitz and Stine Larsen.
- Marathon - 2:29:12 hrs (2007) - fourth among Norwegian marathon runners, only behind Ingrid Kristiansen, Grete Waitz and Stine Larsen.

== Achievements ==
Year	Competition	Venue	Position	Event	Notes
Representing Norway
2005	World Championships	Helsinki, Finland	28th	Marathon	2:35:08
2006	European Championships	Gothenburg, Sweden	13th	Marathon	2:35:59
2007	Stockholm Marathon	Stockholm, Sweden	1st	Marathon	2:37:02
2008	Olympic Games	Beijing, PR China	34th	Marathon	2:34:35
